= Caupolicán Ovalles (writer) =

Venezuelan writer

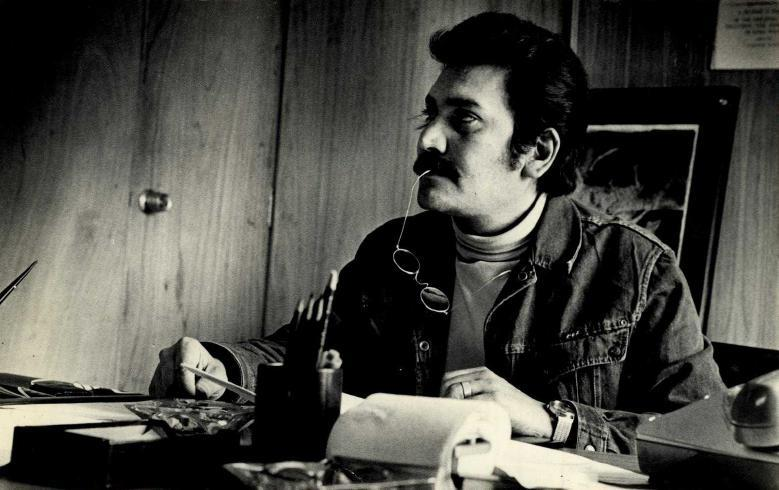

Rafael Honorio Caupolican Ovalles Colmenares (April 24, 1936 Guarenas, Venezuela – February 23, 2001 Caracas, Venezuela) was a controversial Venezuelan writer. He belonged to the avant-garde period of the sixties and was influenced by French Surrealism and American Beatnik.

He actively participated in literary and artistic groups of the time such as The Roof of the Whale and La República del Este, among the most known. His most famous poetry works are ¿Duerme usted, señor presidente? (1962) and Elegía a la muerte de Guatimocín, mi padre, alias El Globo (1967). In 1973 he received the National Prize for Literature (Venezuela) for his collection of poems Copa de Huesos (1972).

== Literary Groups ==
=== Sardio ===
Sardio (1954-1961) was created as a literary group opposed to Marcos Pérez Jimenez's dictatorial government. The proposal of Sardio was both politic and aesthetic. After the dictatorship ended in 1958, they published a homonymous magazine (1958-1961) with eight issues. Later, they separated for political reasons. The group was made up by several poets, writers and painters, including Guillermo Sucre, Gonzalo Castellanos, Elisa Lerner, Salvador Garmendia, Caupolicán Ovalles, Adriano González León, Luis García Morales, Rómulo Aranguibel, Efraín Hurtado, Antonio Pasquali, Francisco Pérez Perdomo, Rodolfo Izaguirre, and Edmundo Aray. Caupolicán was a member of the Editorial Board of Sardio's last issue. The first manifesto of El Techo de la Ballena was published in the last page of that issue.

=== El Techo de la Ballena ===
El Techo de la Ballena (1961-1968) arises as a literary and artistic group conformed by some of the left-wing members of Sardio, including Caupolicán. The group published three issues of the magazine Rayado sobre el Techo. On March 24, 1961 El Techo de la Ballena opens its first exhibition entitled “Para restituir el magma”, at the same time the first manifesto was published in El Techo de la Ballena has been described by the critics as an avant-garde group with revolutionary purposes and multidisciplinary media. It was very active between 1961 and 1965. Among its most explosive expressions is [http://arquitrave.com/entrevistas/arquientrevista_Contramaestre.html“El Homenaje a la Necrofilia”, by Carlos Contramaestre. Some of its most important members were Adriano González León, Alberto Brandt, Carlos Contramaestre, Caupolicán Ovalles, Dámaso Ogaz, Daniel González, Edmundo Aray, Efraín Hurtado, Francisco Pérez Perdomo, Rodolfo Izaguirre and Salvador Garmendia, among others.

=== Sol cuello cortado ===
Sol cuello cortado (1964), a poetry magazine that appeared at the same time as El Techo de la Ballena, published six issues. It was founded by Caupolicán Ovalles and Héctor Silva Michelena; later, Ludovico Silva and Alfredo Silva Estrada contributed to the magazine.

=== La Pandilla de Lautréamont ===
La Pandilla de Lautréamont emerges after the disintegration of El Techo de la Ballena. Gathering around a literary magazine was not working, as was the case of Sardio, El Techo de la Ballena and Sol cuello cortado. After meeting the nadaístas in Colombia, Caupolicán realizes that it was necessary to create an open group, which was related to society and not revolving around an aesthetic expression but around conversation. Victor Valera Mora, Carlos Noguera, Luis Camilo Guevara, Mario Abreu, José Barroeta, and Elí Galindo joined the so-called Pandilla de Lautréamont. The group used to gather at a bar in Sabana Grande called El Viñedo. At one of those gatherings held in October 1968 Caupolicán appointed himself President of the newly founded República del Este.

== La República del Este ==
Established as an open group, La República del Este was located at the so-called Bermuda Triangle of Sabana Grande (Franco's, Camilo's and Il Vecchio Mulino bars and restaurants). It was intended to found a republic diametrically opposed to the one that officiated at the Palace of Miraflores, located in the West of Caracas. They edited five numbers of a homonymous magazine, in which Caupolicán Ovalles and Adriano González León participated as consultants.

The Association of Venezuelan Writers publicly acknowledged La República del Este in 1970. That same year, the population of La República grew up, as a result of the Renewal of the School of Literature (Central University of Venezuela). But the highest increase in population occurred in 1974: people of all kinds having no relation with the political-literary origin of the group joined it. In 1973 the coup d’état became a form of government at La República del Este.

Despite the profuse inflow of people arriving to the group, the permanent members were Adriano González León, Andrés Aguilar, Argimiro Briceño León, Caupolicán Ovalles, Daniel González, David Alizo, Denzil Romero, Enrique Hernández D’Jesus, Elí Galindo, Elías Vallés, Héctor Myerston, la Negra Maggi, Luis Camilo Guevara, Luis Correa, Luis Salazar, Luis Sutherland, Manuel Alfredo Rodríguez, Manuel Matute, Mary Ferrero, Mateo Manaure, Orlando Araujo, Paco Benmamán, Pepe Luis Garrido, Rubén Osorio Canales, Salvador Garmendia, Miyó Vestrini, Víctor Valera Mora, among others.

In 1973, La República del Este's institutionality teeters and the coups d’état became customary. Caupolicán himself says in an interview conducted by Mary Ferrero in this regard: “I legalized the coup d’état as a valid weapon, I ended the administrative framework, established a new international order. The triumph of my candidacy meant anarchy and the victory of surreal thought”.

== Works ==
- 1962: ¿Duerme usted, señor presidente? Ediciones del Techo de la Ballena.
- 1963: En uso de razón. Ediciones Tubulares N° 1.
- 1967 Elegía en rojo a la muerte Guatimocín, mi padre, alias El Globo. Ediciones del Techo de la Ballena.
- 1972: Copa de huesos. Profanaciones. Editorial La Gran Papelería del Mundo.
- 1973: Diario de Praga u sexto sentido. Ediciones UCV.
- 1973: ¡Ha muerto un colmenar de la colmena! Ediciones en Homenaje a Rafael José Colmenares.
- 1980: Canción anónima / Para canción / Canción para Evita Paraíso / Los mil picos de agua. Ediciones de La Gran Papelería del Mundo.
- 1980: El pumpá volador de Armando. Ediciones María de Mase.
- 1986: Yo, Bolívar rey. Contexto Audiovisual III.
- 1989: Convertido en pez viví enamorado del desierto. Ediciones UCV.
- 1996: Usted me debe esa cárcel, Conversaciones en La Ahumada. Rayuela Taller de Ediciones.
- 1998: El Almirante duende. Rayuela Taller de Ediciones.
- 2001: Alfabetarium. La Casa Nacional de las Letras. (póstumo)
- 2016: En (des)uso de la razón. Antología poética y otros textos. Rayuela Taller de Ediciones.

== Acknowledgements ==
- 1973: National Prize for Literature (Venezuela) for the poetry compilation Copa de huesos. Profanaciones.
