= Ramón Palomares =

Venezuelan poet (1935–2016)

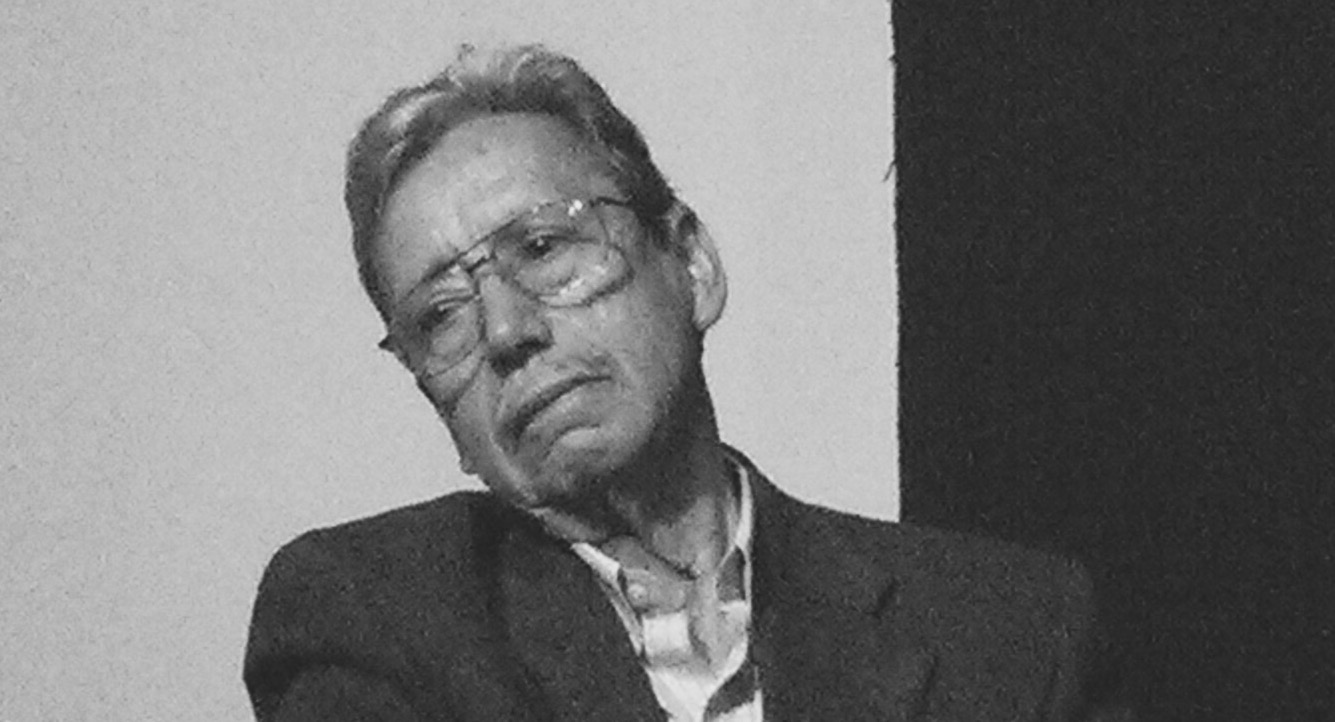
Ramón Palomares

David Ramón Sánchez Palomares (Note: In this name that follows Hispanic American naming customs, the first or paternal surname is Sánchez and the second or maternal family name is Palomares.) (7 May 1935 – 4 March 2016) was a Venezuelan poet, born in Escuque.

In 1975, he received the National Prize for Literature; in 2006, the first Víctor Valera Mora International Prize for Poetry; and in 2010, the Ibero-America Award for Literature.

== Biography ==
From 1952, he worked as teacher in the San Cristóbal Normal School. Six years later, he graduated in literature from the Pedagogical Institute of Caracas. Taught in secondary schools in the states of Nueva Esparta and Trujillo, also in the capital city, Caracas. In the University of the Andes graduates in Literature.

His first poetry book: El Reino (The Kingdom) (1958) is sponsored by the intellectual group Sardio. In 1963 was part of the aesthetic movement El Techo de la Ballena, and participates as editor in the magazine Rayado sobre el Techo. In 1964, in the city of Boconó, is published his book Paisano. The same year come up with the poem El ahogado (The drowned), with the art of Mateo Manaure. In 1965 was awarded with the Municipal Poetry Prize of Caracas by Paisano, and presents Honras Fúnebres (Funeral).

In September 1966, his first child Maria Sanchez was born.

For the celebration of the 400th anniversary of Caracas, he wrote the poem Santiago de León de Caracas (1967), which recreates moments of city's history. In 1975 received the National Prize for Literature for Adiós Escuque ("Goodbye Escuque"). In 1991, the first Mariano Picón Salas Biennial of literature, tribute his career. In 1997 the VI Poetry Week, organized by the Juan Antonio Pérez Bonalde Foundation, is also a homage Palomares.

On 14 June 2001, he was awarded an honorary degree by the University of the Andes, along with poets Rafael Cadenas and Juan Sánchez Peláez. He resided in the city of Mérida until his death on 4 March 2016.

== Works ==
=== Poetry ===
- El Reino. Caracas: Sardio, 1958
- Paisano. Boconó: Ateneo de Boconó, 1964
- El ahogado. Caracas: Editorial Arte, 1964
- Honras fúnebres. Caracas: Poesía de Venezuela, 1965
- Santiago de León de Caracas. Caracas: Editions for the 400th anniversary of Caracas, 1967
- El vientecito suave del amanecer con los primeros aromas. Boconó: Ateneo de Boconó, 1969
- Poesía (1958-1965). Caracas: Pedagogical Institute, 1973
- Adiós a Escuque. Mérida: University of the Andes, 1974
- Poesía. Caracas: Monte Ávila Editores, 1977
- Elegía 1830. Mérida: Municipal Council / University of the Andes, 1980
- El viento y la piedra. Mérida: Grespan company, 1984
- Mérida, elogio de sus ríos. Mérida: Municipal Council / University of the Andes, 1985
- Alegres provincias: homenaje a Humboldt. Caracas: Fundarte, 1988
- Trilogía. Madrid: Ediciones de Cultura Hispánica, 1990
- Mérida, fábula de cuatro ríos. Mérida: Academy of Mérida, 1994
- Lobos y halcones. Caracas: Tierra de Gracia Editores, 1997
- Ramón Palomares. Antología poética. Caracas: Monte Ávila Editores, 2004
- El canto del pájaro en la piedra. Salamanca: Camino de la Lengua Castellana Foundation and Venezuelan Ministry of Education, 2004
- El reino de Escuque. La Habana: Fondo Editorial Casa de las Américas, 2005
- Vuelta a casa. Caracas: Biblioteca Ayacucho, 2006
- Ramón Palomares para niñas y niños. Caracas: Culture Printing Foundation, 2014.
