= National Academy of History =

Venezuelan history institute

The National Academy of the History of Venezuela is an institution dedicated to the study and promotion of the history of Venezuela. Specifically, the objective is the collection of bibliographic, newspaper, audiovisual or other documentation to look at the political, economic and social events that have taken place in the country.

== History ==
The creation of the academy was decreed by the ex-president Juan Pablo Rojas Paúl on October 28, 1888. Its express mission is the study of the history of Venezuela, the Americas and the world with direct relevance to the Venezuelan context. It also deals with the promotion of research in the teaching of history, while at the same time strengthening the Venezuelan identity, all through publishing, audiovisuals and events of various kinds.

Its headquarters are located in the Palace of the Academies on Universidad de Caracas Avenue, between the corners of San Francisco and La Bolsa. In its facilities, it houses its library, which originally contained bibliographic copies, other documents and audiovisual sources. Since 1889 the Individuals of Number who were part of the academy also functioned as the institution's librarians and archivists. Over time, the number of materials increased in such a way that it was necessary to organize these resources into three separate departments: the library itself, the archive and the newspaper and periodical library. In 1952 it moved its headquarters to the Palace of the Academies, where the Venezuelan Academy of Language and the Academy of Physical, Mathematical and Natural Sciences are also located. In 1961 it was decided to open its three branches to the general public.

Among the most outstanding "treasures" of the institution are the Colombeia, the extensive compendium of the writings and diaries of Francisco de Miranda, which contains information and notes on the American Revolutionary War, the French Revolution and the beginnings of the Spanish-American wars of independence. These archives were transferred to the academy between 1929 and 1950 after being acquired by the Venezuelan Government. There are also the archives of Simón Bolívar, composed of correspondence, proclamations, personal and military documents, decrees and notes on Latin American societies written by the Liberator. These are kept in a separate annex of the Academy that is located in the Traposos Corner, on the same avenue. Both compilations have been included in UNESCO's Memory of the World Program.

On June 5, 1940, the first woman joined the academy: Lucila Luciani de Pérez Díaz. Her speech was inspired by General Francisco de Miranda, expressing the equality of women in social, cultural and official aspects. She entered occupying seat X, vacant due to the death of Plácido Daniel Rodríguez Rivero. The welcome speech was given by Dr. Juan José Mendoza.

== Individuals by number (Individuos de número) ==
Until 2015, they were titled Academics of Number (Académicos de Número). By order of induction, since 1960:

- Guillermo Morón (1926–2021; inducted 1960, seat P)
- Joaquín Gabaldón Márquez (1906–1984; inducted 1960)
- Caracciolo Parra Pérez (1888–1964; inducted 1960)
- Angel Francisco Brice (1894–1969; inducted 1960)
- Arturo Uslar Pietri (1906–2001; inducted 1960)
- Mario Briceño Perozo (1917–1995; inducted 1961)
- Edgar Sanabria (1911–1989; inducted 1963)
- Virgilio Tosta (1922–2012; inducted1963)
- Luis Beltrán Guerrero (1914–1997; inducted 1964)
- Blas Bruni Celli (1925–2013; inducted 1965, seat K)
- Carlos Manuel Möller Mejías (1896–1966; inducted 1966)
- José Antonio Calcaño (musician) (1900–1978; inducted 1967)
- Jerónimo Martínez Mendoza Álvarez (1902–1972; inducted 1967)
- Tomás Pérez Tenreiro (inducted 1969)
- Ildefonso Leal (1932–2015; inducted 1971, seat O)
- José Humberto Quintero (1902–1984; inducted 1971)
- Ramón José Velásquez (1916–2014; inducted 1971, seat T)
- Rafael Armando Rojas (1914–2007; inducted 1971)
- José Luis Salcedo Bastardo (1926–2005; inducted 1973)
- Oscar Beaujón (1914–1990; inducted 1973)
- José Carrillo Moreno (1922–1975; inducted 1973)
- Lucas Guillermo Castillo Lara (1921–2002; inducted 1977)
- Nicolás Perazzo (1904–1987; inducted 1978)
- Ermila Troconis de Veracoechea (1929–2018; inducted 1978, seat Q)
- Santiago Gerardo Suárez (1930–1996; inducted 1979)
- José Antonio de Armas Chitty (1908–1995; inducted 1979)
- Tomás Polanco Alcántara (1927–2002; inducted 1980)
- Rafael Fernández Heres (1923–2010; inducted 1985, seat J)
- Manuel Pérez Vila (1922–1991; inducted 1986)
- Mario Sanoja Obediente (1934–2022; inducted 1987, seat Ll)
- Carlos Federico Duarte Gaillard (born 1939; inducted 1987, seat I)
- Tomás Enrique Carrillo Batalla (1921–2015; inducted 1989, seat V)
- Marianela Ponce Senior (born 1944; inducted 1990, seat E)
- Ramón Adolfo Tovar López (1923–2018; inducted 1991, seat H)
- Manuel Alfredo Rodríguez (born 1962; inducted 1992)
- Pedro Grases (1909–2004; inducted 1992)
- José Del Rey Fajardo (born 1934; inducted 1996, seat S)
- Manuel Rodríguez Campos (1930–2018; inducted 1997, seat M)
- Elías Pino Iturrieta (born 1944; inducted 1997, seat N)
- Simón Alberto Consalvi (1927–2013; inducted 1997, seat C)
- José Rafael Lovera González (1939–2021; inducted 1998, seat G)
- Santos Rodulfo Cortés (1924–2014; inducted 2002, seat Z)
- Pedro Cunill Grau (born 1935; inducted 2004, seat R)
- Germán Cardozo Galué (1940–2017; inducted 2005, seat D)
- Héctor Enrique Bencomo Barrios (1924–2012; inducted 2005, seat E)
- Manuel Antonio Caballero Agüero (1931–2010; inducted 2005, seat F)
- Inés Mercedes Quintero Montiel (born 1955; inducted 2005, seat L)
- Germán Carrera Damas (born 1930; inducted 2007, seat X)
- María Elena González Deluca (born 1941; inducted 2010, seat Y)
- Edgardo Mondolfi Gudat (born 1964; inducted 2011, seat J)
- Manuel Donís Ríos (born 1950; inducted 2011, seat F)
- María Elena Plaza Palacios (born 1952; inducted 2012, seat B)
- Diego Bautista Urbaneja Arroyo (born 1947; inducted 2013, seat K)
- Rogelio Pérez Perdomo (inducted 2014, seat C)
- Tomás Straka (born 1972; inducted 2015, seat O)
- Carole Leal Curiel (born 1952; inducted 2016, seat T)
- Luis Ugalde (born 1938; inducted 2018, seat Z)
- Gustavo Vaamonde (born 1972; inducted 2018, seat D)
- Catalina Banko (born 1946; inducted 2018, seat V)
- Reinaldo Rojas (inducted 2019, seat H)
- Ocarina Castillo D'Imperio (inducted 2020; seat Q)

== Corresponding members ==
- Humberto Tejera (1890–1971; corresponding member in Mexico; inducted 1966)
- Micheal Tarver (born 1958; corresponding member in USA; inducted 2023)

== See also ==
- Venezuelan Academy of Language
