= Venezuelan literature =

Venezuelan literature is the literature written by Venezuelans or in Venezuela, ranging from indigenous pre-Hispanic myths to oral or written works in Spanish or other languages. The origins of Venezuelan written literature are usually held to date back to the documents written by the first Spanish colonizers, its date of birth being sometimes set at August 31, 1498, when Christopher Columbus called the Venezuelan territory in his Diaries "Tierra de gracia" ("Land of Grace").

== History ==
=== Colonial period ===
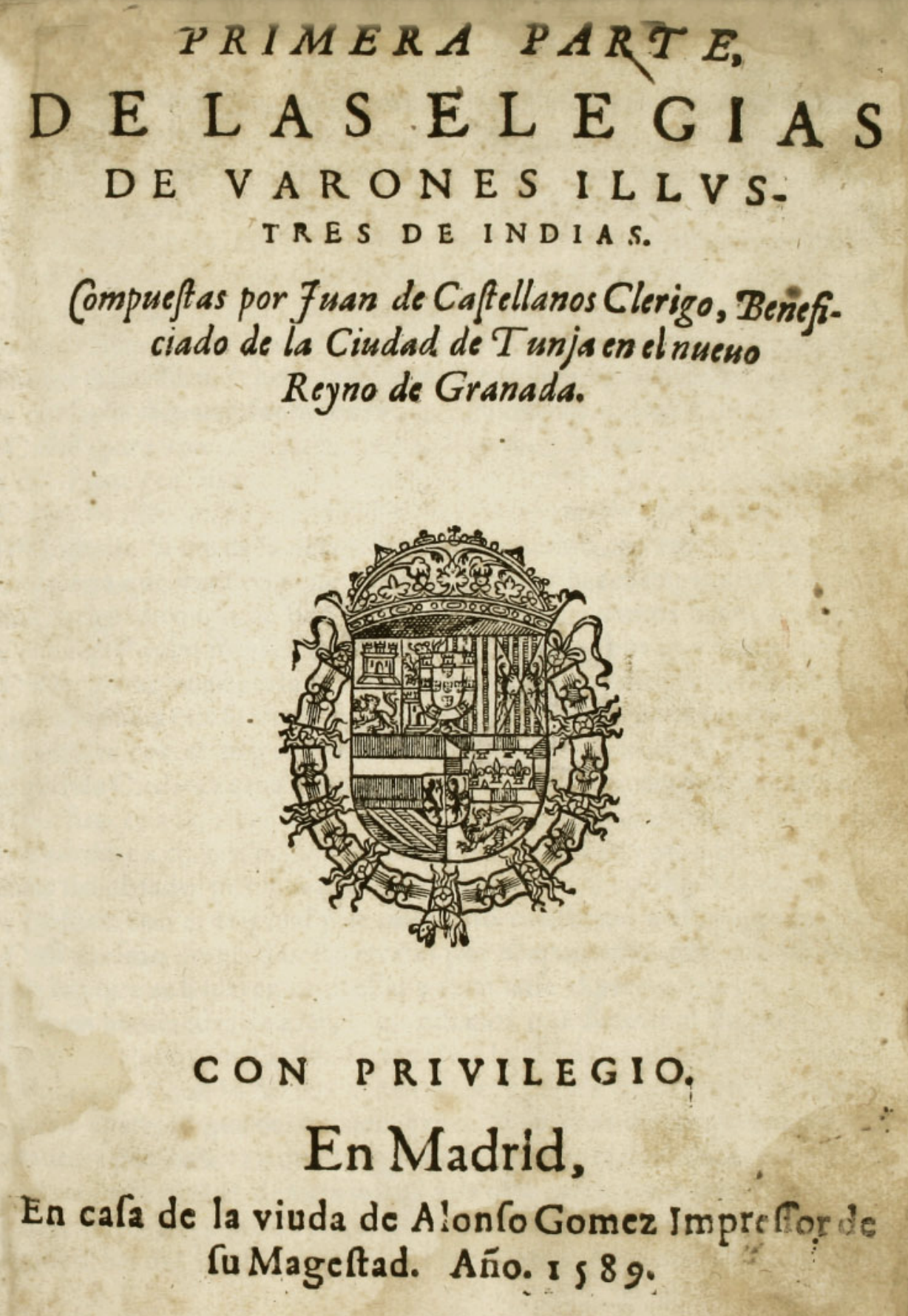
Juan de Castellanos, Elegías de varones ilustres de Indias (1589).

Literature written in Venezuelan territory began to develop at the time of the Conquest of America with the Chronicles of the Indies and later with the first autograph texts by colonial authors. Literary activity was constant throughout the colonial period, but due to the late introduction of the printing press in the region, few works have survived to the present day. Between 1563 and 1564, Pedro de la Cadena wrote his epic poem Los actos y hazañas valerosas del capitán Diego Hernández de Serpa, which is the first written work of literature with a Venezuelan theme and possibly the earliest poem written in the Americas in a European language. De la Cadena and other Spanish authors who set the action of their poems on Cubagua island, like Juan de Castellanos (author of the Elegías de varones ilustres de Indias) or Jorge de Herrera, were known at the time as the "poets of Cubagua".

Some chroniclers of the Indies who never set foot on Venezuela are nevertheless considered part of the history of its literature due to the fact that they recounted episodes of local history such as the founding and destruction of Nueva Cádiz, the pearl trade of Cubagua and Margarita, or the process of colonisation. Among these were Bartolomé de las Casas (A Short Account of the Destruction of the Indies, 1552), Gonzalo Fernández de Oviedo (Historia general y natural de las Indias, 1535, and Sumario de la natural historia de las Indias, 1526) Francisco López de Gómara (Historia general de las Indias, 1552), and Gonzalo Jiménez de Quesada (Epítome de la conquista del Nuevo Reino de Granada, 1539). Later chroniclers who did inhabit the territory include Pedro Simón, who in 1626 published Noticias historiales de las conquistas de Tierra Firme en las Indias Occidentales, on the conquest of the present territories of Venezuela and Colombia, and Jacinto de Carvajal, whose Relación del descubrimiento del río Apure hasta su ingreso en el Orinoco, or Jornadas náuticas (1648), records the first catalogue of indigenous peoples of Venezuela (a list of 105 nations, some of which remain unknown) as well as the first case of plagiarism committed in the region.

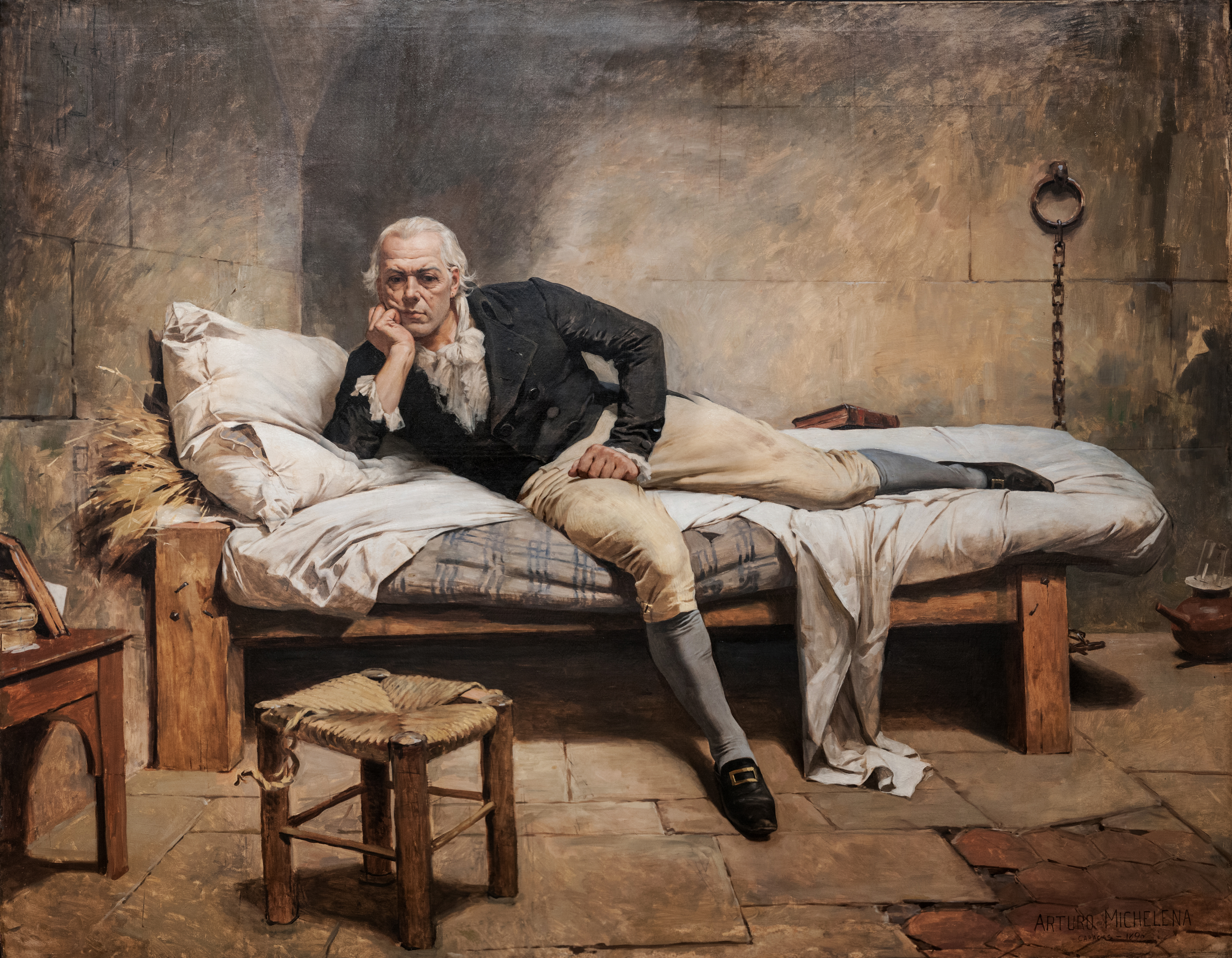
Miranda in La Carraca (1896), by Arturo Michelena, depicts Francisco de Miranda during his last days, in the prison of Cádiz.

Venezuelan colonial culture developed considerably in the eighteenth century. The panegyric Lágrimas amorosas, by Nicolás Herrera y Ascanio, priest at the Caracas Cathedral, was published in Mexico in 1707. In 1723, José de Oviedo y Baños completed his Historia de la conquista y población de la Provincia de Venezuela. In 1732, the Venezuelan priest José Mijares de Solórzano had the three volumes of his Sermones magistrales published in Madrid. Joseph Gumilla published El Orinoco ilustrado y defendido and Historia natural, civil y geográfica de las naciones situadas en las riveras del río Orinoco, two important contributions to the historiography of the indigenous peoples of Venezuela, in 1745 and 1791 respectively. Of the works of the extremely prolific writer Juan Antonio Navarrete (1749-1814), Franciscan friar and supporter of independence, only three have survived: the Novena de Santa Efigenia, the Cursus Philosophicus Iuxtamiram, and the Arca de letras y Teatro universal. The latter, probably written between 1783 and 1813-1814, is a monumental work with an extremely complex structure that compiles with great erudition and lexicographical skill much of the knowledge available at the time. The late eighteenth century also saw the publication of the best known Venezuelan prose works from the colonial period, the Diaries of Francisco de Miranda (1771-1792). Miranda also authored several texts recounting his participation in the French Revolution, as well as his negotiations with the governments of England, France and the United States of America to seek support for the independence of Spanish America. Finally, it was in the late colonial period that the first known Venezuelan woman writer, the Carmelite nun Sor María Josefa de los Ángeles (1765-1818?) published her work. Most of her poetry, marked by an intense mystical sentiment inspired by Saint Teresa of Ávila, was lost during the War of Independence. However, two of her texts, Anhelo ("Yearning") and Terremoto ("Earthquake"), have made it to the present day.

=== 19th century ===
The arrival of the printing press in Caracas in 1808, on the eve of independence, led to the emergence of several newspapers, most notably Correo de la Trinidad Española, Gazeta de Caracas as well as of its first major authors, Andrés Bello and Rafael María Baralt.

In this period shines the poetic production of Andrés Bello (1781-1865), the first poet to propose the creation of a lyrical American expression. His poetry is considered the precursor of lyrical themes on the Latin American continent, as shown in Address of Poetry (1823) and Silva to Agriculture in the Torrid Zone (1826).

During the war of independence the first printing press was installed in Angostura. With it, a great newspaper were born, especially El Correo del Orinoco, where ideas of independence were disseminated, after being tested through public speeches.

The correspondence of the liberators and the official documents of his republican powers elucidate not only the colossal mosaic of his political genius, but the cleanliness of an exquisite and intense pen. Of great beauty and deep philosophical concern Mi delirio sobre el Chimborazo, a unique masterpiece that distinguishes Simon Bolivar the contradictions of his time, and in the proportion that goes from the ethereal vision of a tribune to the humility of a prophet made for a nascent and promising world.

Simón Rodríguez (1769-1854), philosopher, in Caracas, in a well-thought-out essay on nascent republics, provides an interesting work, although scattered, according to the twists and turns of his personal life, not only a compilation of sociological concerns, but also of the urgency of intellectual code. For the sponsorship of his famous student, Simon Bolivar, he partially manages to implement some of his ideas, later developed, and in an authentic Castilian and sometimes as ironic as Voltaire. In addition to his publications and correspondence, he remains famous for his defense of the Bolivarian feat, constructed with logical rigor.

Rafael María Baralt y Pérez was a Venezuelan diplomat and one of the country's most famed writers, philologists, and historians. In 1840 published in Paris his Resumen de la Historia de Venezuela y Diccionario de galicismos. On 1841 he travelled to London and then settled in Seville and Madrid. There he produced most of his abundant literary work. Among his works, his ode Adiós a la Patria. Occupies an important place, considered to be of impressive poetic richness. He also held important positions in the Kingdom of Spain, such as director of the Gaceta de la Corona and administrator of the Imprenta Nacional. He was the first Latin American to occupy a chair at the Real Academia Española. He took up his seat on 27 November 1853.

Works from this period address issues such as the War of Independence (e.g., Eduardo Blanco's 1881 Venezuela Heroica) and the political conflicts between conservatives and liberals. Novels, short stories, and plays were written in the mid-nineteenth century by authors such as Fermín Toro, Julio Calcaño, Eduardo Blanco, Zulima, Juan Vicente Camacho, and Tomás Michelena, and the end of the century saw the local emergence of international literary movements such as modernismo, cosmopolitismo, and criollismo.

=== 20th century ===
In the 20th century, with the modernization and urbanization of Venezuela thanks to the economic boom provided by petroleum, some of its finest writers were: Teresa de la Parra, Rómulo Gallegos, Arturo Uslar Pietri, Salvador Garmendia, Enrique Bernardo Núñez, Julio Garmendia, José Antonio Ramos Sucre. Gallegos' Doña Bárbara (1929) was described in 1974 as "possibly the most widely known Latin American novel". The National Prize for Literature, awarded annually, was established in 1948, with Uslar Pietri the only writer to win twice in the first five decades. Vanguard playwrights from the 1960s include Levy Rossel, author of the 1966 musical theatre play Vimazoluleka. Rafael Cadenas and Eugenio Montejo are among the best known poets of the 20th century and the beginning of the 21st century.

=== 21st century ===
At the start of the 21st century, Venezuelan fiction boomed with major new works by Federico Vegas, Francisco Suniaga, Ana Teresa Torres and Slavko Župčić. According to critic and journalist Boris Muñoz, Venezuelan fiction has "opened up to find a bigger audience, through noir novels, historical novels, without renouncing its own Venezuelan idiosyncrasies". With the Venezuelan refugee crisis in the 2010s, migration has become a predominant topic in Venezuelan literature. Many Venezuelan writers live and publish outside the country, notably in Spain, the United States and other parts of Latin America.

In the 2010s and 2020s, Venezuelan writers won several international prizes. In 2019, Rodrigo Blanco Calderón won the Bienal de Novela Mario Vargas Llosa for his first novel, The Night (first published 2016). In 2021, Karina Sainz Borgo won the O. Henry Prize for her short story "Scissors" [Tijeras]. In 2022, Rafael Cadenas won the Miguel de Cervantes Prize, the highest literary honour in the Spanish-speaking world.

== Oral literature ==
Venezuela has a rich oral literature of stories and legends, many of the latter related to historical figures. Many of these stories have their origins in the oral tradition of the country's indigenous ethnic groups, while others are "creole" tales. Some of the county's most popular legends are linked to ghosts or terrors, such as El Silbón and la Sayona.

== See also ==
- List of Venezuelan writers
- Latin American literature
- Culture of Venezuela
- List of libraries in Venezuela
- Rómulo Gallegos Prize
