= National Prize for Literature (Venezuela) =

The National Prize for Literature (Spanish: Premio Nacional de Literatura) is a literary award made annually to Venezuelan writers.

- 1948 Mario Briceño Iragorry (El Regente Heredia o la piedad heroica)
- 1949 Carlos Augusto León (A solas con la vida)
- 1950 Santiago Key Ayala (Bajo el signo del Avila)
- 1951 Juan Liscano (Humano destino)
- 1952 Ramón Díaz Sánchez (Guzmán: elipse de una ambición de poder)
- 1953 Félix Armando Núñez (El poema de la tarde)
- 1954 Mariano Picón Salas (Los días de Cipriano Castro)
- 1954 Arturo Uslar Pietri (Las nubes)
- 1955 Manuel Felipe Rugeles (Cantos de sur y norte)
- 1956 Miguel Otero Silva (Casas Muertas)
- 1956 Augusto Mijares (La luz y el espejo)
- 1957 Juan Beroes (Poemas itálicos : materia de eternidad)
- 1958 Rómulo Gallegos (La doncella)
- 1959 Juan Manuel González (La heredad junto al viento)
- 1960 José Fabbiani Ruiz (A orillas del sueño)
- 1961 José Ramón Medina (Memorias y elegías)
- 1962 José Antonio de Armas Chitty (Tucupido, Formación de un Pueblo del Llano)
- 1963 Luis Pastori (Elegía sin fin)
- 1964 Arturo Croce (El espacio en el tiempo)
- 1965 José Tadeo Arreaza Calatrava (category: poetry. Poesía)
- 1966 Alberto Arvelo Torrealba (Lazo Martí: vigencia en lejanía)
- 1967 Fernando Paz Castillo (Poesía)
- 1968 Guillermo Meneses (Espejos y disfraces)
- 1969 Vicente Gerbasi (Poesía de viajes)
- 1970 Alfredo Armas Alfonzo (El osario de Dios)
- 1970 Luis Beltrán Guerrero (El tema de la revolución)
- 1971 Pablo Rojas Guardia (La voz inacabada)
- 1972 Alfredo Boulton (Historia de la pintura en Venezuela)
- 1972 Salvador Garmendia (Los escondites)
- 1973
  - Caupolicán Ovalles (category: poetry. Copa de huesos)
  - Jose Luis Salcedo Bastardo (Bolívar: un continente y un destino)
  - Ramón José Velásquez (prose category, for La caída del liberalismo amarillo
- 1974 José Ramón Heredia (category: poetry. Antología poética)
- 1974 Pedro Pablo Barnola Duxans (category: essay. Afirmaciones de cultura)
- 1974 Julio Garmendia (lifetime achievement)
- 1975 Orlando Araujo (category: essay. Contrapunteo de la vida y de la muerte: ensayo sobre la poesía de Alberto Arvelo Torrealba)
- 1975 Ramón Palomares (Adios Escuque)
- 1976 Antonia Palacios (El largo día ya seguro)
- 1976 Juan Sánchez Peláez (category: poetry. Rasgos comunes)
- 1976 Guillermo Sucre (category: essay. La máscara, la transparencia)
- 1977 Ida Gramcko (category: poetry)
- 1978 Juan David García Bacca (lifetime achievement)
- 1978 Luis Alberto Crespo (category: poetry. Costumbre de Sequía)
- 1979 Francisco Pérez Perdomo (lifetime achievement)
- 1980 Adriano González León (lifetime achievement)
- 1981 Miguel Ramón Utrera
- 1982 Arturo Uslar Pietri (La isla de Robinson)
- 1983 Pascual Venegas Filardo
- 1984 Isaac J Pardo (essay: Fuegos bajo el agua)
- 1985 Rafael Cadenas (lifetime achievement)
- 1986 Luz Machado (lifetime achievement)
- 1987 Rafael Ángel Díaz Sosa (lifetime achievement)
- 1989 Ana Enriqueta Terán (lifetime achievement)
- 1990 Guillermo Morón (lifetime achievement)
- 1991 José Balza (lifetime achievement)
- 1992 Pedro Pablo Paredes (lifetime achievement)
- 1993 Pedro Grases (lifetime achievement)
- 1994 Elizabeth Schön (lifetime achievement)
- 1995 Gustavo Díaz Solís (lifetime achievement)
- 1996 José Manuel Briceño Guerrero (lifetime achievement)
- 1997 Alfredo Silva Estrada (lifetime achievement)
- 1998 Eugenio Montejo (lifetime achievement)
- 1999 Elisa Lerner (lifetime achievement)
- 2000 Gustavo Pereira (lifetime achievement)
- 2001 Luis Britto García (lifetime achievement)
- 2003 Carlos Noguera (lifetime achievement)
- 2006 Renato Rodríguez (lifetime achievement)
- 2008 William Osuna (lifetime achievement)
- 2010 Luis Albero Crespo (lifetime achievement)
- 2012 Francisco Massiani (lifetime achievement)

== See also ==
- List of literary awards
- Literature of Venezuela
