= Enrique Núñez =

Enrique Núñez may refer to:

- José Enrique Núñez Guijarro (born 1974), Spanish politician
- Enrique Bernardo Núñez (1895–1964), Venezuelan writer and journalist
