= Fernando Paz Castillo =

Venezuelan poet (1893-1981)

- Born: 11 April 1893; Caracas, Venezuela
- Died: 30 July 1981 (aged 88); Caracas, Venezuela

Fernando Paz Castillo Aristeguieta (11 April 1893 in Caracas – 30 July 1981 in Caracas), was a Venezuelan poet, literary critic, diplomat, and educator. He received the National Prize for Literature in 1967.

== Partial bibliography ==
- La huerta de Doñana (1920)
- La voz de los cuatro vientos (1931)
- Signo (1937)
- Entre sombras y luces (1945)
- Reflexiones de atardecer (1964)
- Antología poética (1969)
- Entre pintores y escritores (1970)
- El otro lado del tiempo (1971)
- Poesías escogidas 1920-1974 (1974)
- Persistencia (1975)

== See also ==
- Venezuelan literature
- List of Venezuelan writers
