= Luis García Morales =

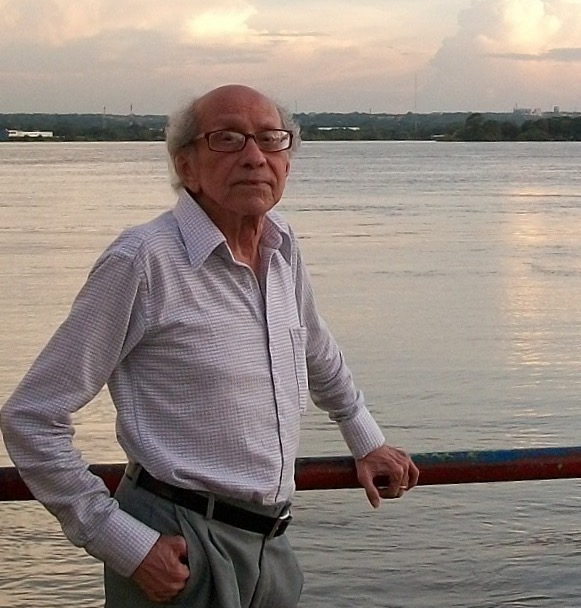
- Luis García Morales in 2009
- Born: Luis Antonio García Morales; August 6, 1929; Ciudad Bolívar, Venezuela
- Died: July 3, 2015 (aged 85); Caracas, Venezuela
- Known for: Poems, cultural promotion

Signature
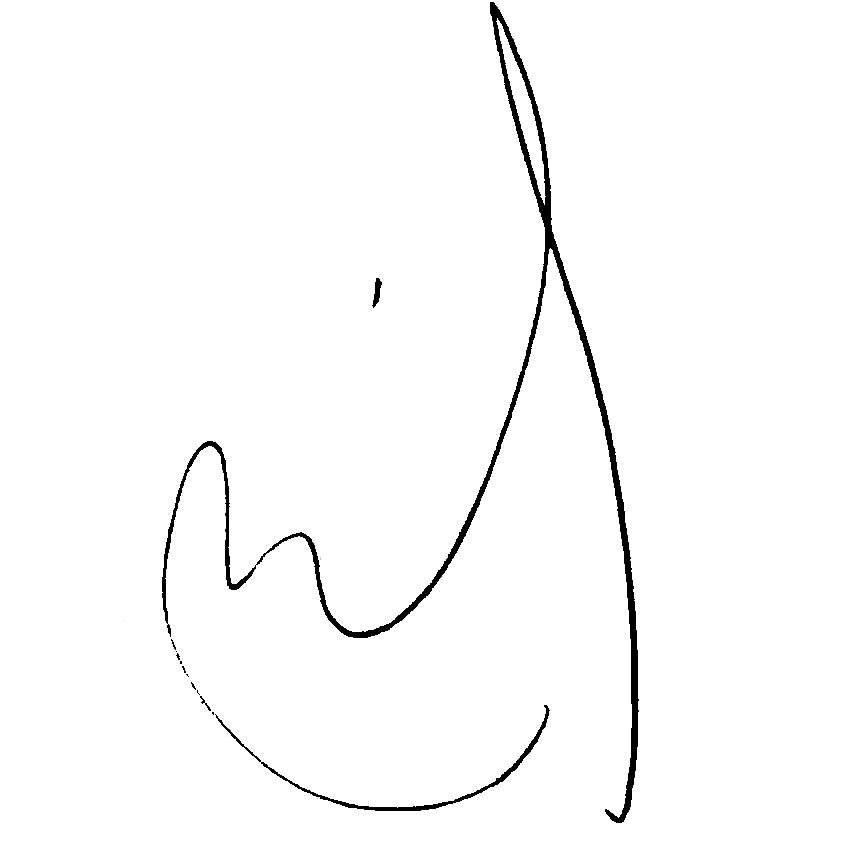

Luis Antonio García Morales (August 6, 1929 – July 3, 2015) was a Venezuelan poet and a cultural promoter born in Ciudad Bolívar. In 1984, his book of poems El río siempre won the prize of the Venezuela's National Council of Culture.

== Career ==
García was a member of the Sardio group in 1958, along with writers Guillermo Sucre, Salvador Garmendia, Rodolfo Izaguirre and Elisa Lerner. By the end of the 1950s, he traveled to Paris, where he settled down for three years, during that time he went across a part of Europe and the Middle East. In 1963 he returned to Venezuela, and was designated as editorial chief of the National Culture Magazine, he also worked in the direction of the Radio Nacional de Venezuela, the INCIBA (National Institute for Fine Arts) and the seal Monte Avila Editores. In 1975, he was the founding president of the National Council for Culture (Conac). In the 1980s he hosted El Cantar de los Cantares in the Cultural Radio Station of Caracas. For thirteen years, this program was dedicated to poetry.

== Death ==
When he died in Caracas on 3 July 2015, as a result of a respiratory collapse, his ashes were scattered into the Orinoco River (to which he dedicated a big part of his life's artistic work) located in his hometown.

== Books ==
- Lo real y la memoria (1962)
- El río siempre (1983)
- De un sol a otro (1997. Caracas Prize for Poetry in 1998)
