= Enrique Bernardo Núñez =

Venezuelan writer (1895–1964)

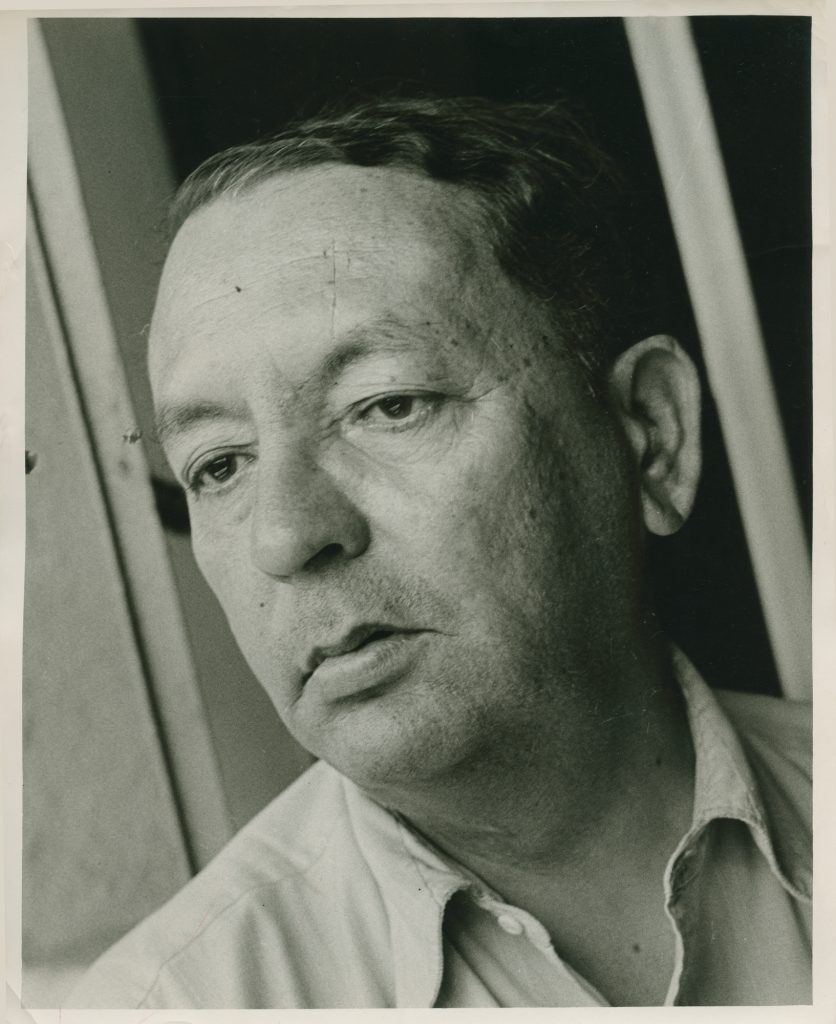
Enrique Bernardo Núñez in 1950.

Enrique Bernardo Núñez Rodríguez (Valencia, May 20, 1895 – Caracas, October 1, 1964) was a Venezuelan writer and journalist, twice the official chronicler of Caracas, author of Cubagua (1931) and La galera de Tiberio (1938), and a full member of the National Academy of History since 1948.

== Biography ==
The son of Enrique Núñez and Isabel María Rodríguez, he was born and spent his childhood in Valencia. He studied at the Escuela Rafael Pérez and later at the Colegio Requena in Valencia. After finishing secondary school, in 1910 he moved to Caracas intending to study medicine at the Universidad Central de Venezuela and to dedicate himself to journalism.

Two years after entering the university, he abandoned his studies, drawn instead to his literary vocation. During this time, he became a regular participant in the gatherings of writers later known as the Generación de 1918, and he wrote his first serious works.

== Literary career ==
In 1918 he received an honorable mention in a contest for his work Bolívar orador, and published his first novel, Sol interior. In 1920 he released his second novel, Después de Ayacucho.

He also began his journalistic career, working as an editor for El Imparcial between 1919 and 1920, and later contributing from 1922 onward to newspapers such as El Universal, El Heraldo, and El Nuevo Diario, as well as magazines like Élite and Billiken. He directed the newspaper El Heraldo de Margarita, which he founded in 1925, during his tenure as Secretary General of the Government of the state of Nueva Esparta, appointed by then-governor and fellow writer Manuel Díaz Rodríguez.

He also pursued a diplomatic career, serving as First Secretary of Venezuela in Colombia, Cuba, and Panama, and as Consul of Venezuela in Baltimore, United States.

In 1931 he published his most recognized work: Cubagua. Núñez conceived Cubagua toward the end of 1925 during a stay in Margarita Island; he wrote it between 1928 and 1930, and it was finally published in Paris in 1931 by Le Livre Libre. The initial circulation was limited, and the Venezuelan critics paid little attention to it upon release; however, over time it came to be regarded as a major work.

In 1938 he published La galera de Tiberio. This novel depicts a futuristic Latin America, using mythical and historical registers. It intertwines three temporal planes (past, present, and future), offering a possible vision of Venezuela and the world. A central role in the novel is played by a ring that has the power to alter the course of events and that once belonged to Tiberius, Ferdinand of Aragon, Charles V, Philip II, or John of Austria, before ending up in the hands of a U.S. admiral. According to Carlos Sandoval, it is one of the early examples of science fiction novels in Venezuela.

In the 1940s he returned to Venezuela, where he continued his journalistic work in various newspapers. He was appointed chronicler of Caracas in 1945 and held that position (intermittently) until 1964, during which time he promoted the magazine Crónica de Caracas. As chronicler of the city, he wrote La ciudad de los techos rojos (1947–1949), considered a milestone in Venezuelan urban chronicle writing for its documented reconstruction of the topography, historical memory, and identity of the capital, Caracas. It was one of Núñez's emblematic projects as the city's official chronicler.

In 1948 he became a full member of the National Academy of History. His induction speech was titled Juicios sobre la historia de Venezuela, and was responded to by Mario Briceño Iragorry. He was also appointed a corresponding member of the National Academy of History of Argentina.

He edited and wrote the prologue for the first four issues of Los Anales Diplomáticos de Venezuela, a publication founded in 1943 by Foreign Minister Caracciolo Parra Pérez but which did not begin to appear until 1952, when Núñez took charge of it.

He died in Caracas on October 1, 1964.

== Legacy ==
Critics have highlighted Núñez's poetics of the mythical and the historical: the montage of temporal planes, the dialogue between the crónica de Indias, the archive, orality, and the use of myths and symbols to reflect on the nation and peripheral modernity. His prose, symbolism, and essayistic-poetic tone resonate with contemporaries such as Julio Garmendia and José Antonio Ramos Sucre.

According to Carlos Pacheco, “As happened with the work of other ex-centric Venezuelan writers such as José Antonio Ramos Sucre or Julio Garmendia, Núñez’s literary writing—and particularly the aesthetic significance of Cubagua—only came to be truly recognized in the second half of the 20th century. Critics of multiple and sometimes contrasting orientations have been ‘discovering’ since the 1960s this narrative island, and many persist today in venturing into its dense textual geography to carry out new analytical and interpretive explorations (...) What happened with Núñez also happened in the same period with Roberto Arlt or Macedonio Fernández in Argentina, Pablo Palacio in Ecuador, Julio Torri in Mexico, or Felisberto Hernández in Uruguay: no one read them carefully or perceptively, and some were even branded as mad or strange.”

In both Cubagua and La galera de Tiberio, cyclical time and the indigenous perspective articulate a historical and counter-colonial reading of the conquest that engages with oil-era neocolonialism.

The National Association of Chroniclers of Venezuela (ANCOV) designated his birthday as the National Day of the Official Chronicler. In his honor, the Municipal Council of Caracas established the “Premio Municipal al Patrimonio Histórico Enrique Bernardo Núñez.”

== Works ==
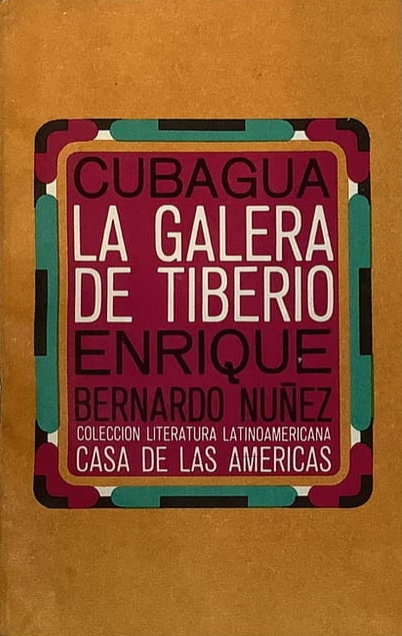
Cuban edition of Cubagua and La galera de Tiberio.

=== Novels ===
- 1918: Sol interior
- 1920: Después de Ayacucho
- 1931: Cubagua
- 1938: La galera de Tiberio

=== Short stories collections ===
- 1932: Don Pablos en América
- 1997: La insurgente y otros relatos

=== Essays ===
- 1918: Bolívar orador
- 1939: Signos en el tiempo
- 1943: El hombre de la levita gris
- 1944: Arístides Rojas, anticuario del Nuevo Mundo
- 1945: Tres momentos en la controversia de límites con Guayana
- 1947–1949: La ciudad de los techos rojos
- 1954: Viaje por el país de las máquinas
- 1963: Bajo el samán

== Awards and distinctions ==
- 1947: Municipal Literature Prize
- 1948: Full member of the National Academy of History
- 1950: Premio Nacional de Periodismo Juan Vicente González
