= Vimazoluleka =

2017 Venezuelan musical movie

Vimazoluleka is a 1966 musical theatre play by Levy Rosell and his group Bohemio. In 2014-2015 Rossel filmed an adaptation with Alejo Felipe, Mirla Castellanos, Julio Mota, Andreina Alvarez and Orlando Delgado that was announced for a release March 2017.

== Play ==
Message of the play

In Vimazolulekaka you play theatre in the cinema and cinema in the theatre, but all derived from ‘a real reality’, which is also told, sung and danced as a common thread, sometimes in more than 10 songs and choreographies that reach their fullness or their decadence, depending on the viewer's point of view, with the appearance of the mythological figure of Pandora, who, from her box, liberates all suffering, but in the end comes hope, which must never be lost and which is represented in the children who are sensitive to the reality of the humblest of the humblest.

— Levy Rossell, Interview in La Patilla

=== Reception ===
Vimazoluleka is described as "the most successful vanguard play of the period" by Mark Dineen in his book on Venezuelan culture. It was also said to reflect the "juvenile and rebel spirit" of the time according to Lawrence Boudon and is widely considered a key-moment in the cultural history of Venezuela. It is described as "an experimental game full of music, colours and juvenile spontaneity."

The play was described by R. Durbin as a "musical show of social protest that was a success in terms of critical reception and audiences".

The play was also staged outside of Venezuela, including in the United States.

The play was originally written by Rossell when he was only 17.

=== Content ===
The title is an invented word based on the first syllables of the names of Rossell's friends. The play is described as "experimental".

The play originally featured 13 characters but later productions included the participations of 30 actors.

== Screen adaptation ==
=== Cast ===
- Alejo Felipe
- Orlando Delgado
- Julio Mota
- Mirla Castellanos
- Andreina Alvarez
- Diana Patricia
- El Moreno Michael

=== Production ===
Levy Rossel developed the idea for the film based on his own theater play. Initially, the production was supported by Tele Aragua and its president, Esteban Trapiello, with the rest of the funding collected through a nonprofit campaign.

Filming took place between 2014 and 2015 in several locations across the states of Aragua and Carabobo.

Postproduction was made by Guacharo Productions.

== Official sites ==
- Vimazoluleka Oficial (YouTube)
