= Félix Armando Núñez =

Venezuelan writer (1897–1972)

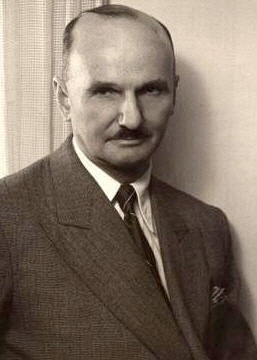
Venezuelan writer Félix Armando Nuñez (1897-1972).

Félix Armando Núñez (November 28, 1897 - May 16, 1972) was a Venezuelan poet, essayist, and critic who lived in Chile since 1914, where he worked as a professor.

== Biography ==
He was born on November 28, 1897, in Boqueron, Maturín, Monagas State, Venezuela. He studied at the Federal School of Maturin, enrolled at the Teacher Training School of Caracas in 1913, and in 1914, he received a scholarship to study at the José Abelardo Núñez Teacher Training School in Santiago, Chile. In 1915 he graduated from the Teacher Training School, and in 1916, after graduating from high school, he began his studies at the Pedagogical Institute of the University of Chile where in 1919 he obtained the title of Castilian professor. In 1921 he moved to Concepción, Chile to work as a high school teacher, a position he held for 19 years. From 1922 went on to work at the university, where he was appointed the General Secretariat in 1931, he was then elected Dean of the Faculty of Education and Member of the Governing Body of the magazine Ateneo. Between 1940-1941 he worked at the Pedagogical Institute of Caracas in the Departments of Philosophy and Pedagogy.

He returned to Chile where he continued his work as a teacher at the University of Concepción until 1947 when he moved to Santiago. In the period between 1951-1952 he obtained the National Prize for Literature and received the "Order of Merit Bernardo O'Higgins".

He died in Santiago, Chile on May 16, 1972.

== Works ==
- (1943) Canciones de Todos los Tiempos
- (1922) El Corazón Abierto
- (1954) Fastos del Espíritu
- (1919) La Luna de otoño
- (1945) Moradas Improvistas
- (1953) Poema Filial
- (1919) La Voz Intima
