= Mariano Picón Salas =

Venezuelan cultural critic

- Born: January 26, 1901; Mérida, Mérida State, Venezuela
- Died: January 1, 1965 (aged 63); Caracas, Venezuela

Signature
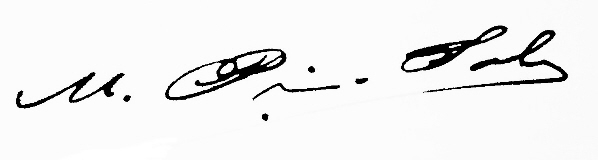

Mariano Federico Picón Salas was a Venezuelan diplomatic, cultural critic and writer of the 20th century, born in Mérida (Mérida State) on January 26, 1901, and died in Caracas on January 1, 1965.

== Career ==
Among his books, his collection of essays on history, literary criticism and cultural history are remarkable. He travelled a lot through the Americas. His work is also important because of his wide perspective, studying the culture of the entire continent. He left Venezuela, under the political persecution of dictator Juan Vicente Gómez. Living for a large period in Chile, he studied history, gaining the degree of “Profesor de Historia” and later a doctorate in philosophy and letters.

He came back to Venezuela in 1936, working as a professor and author. He founded the Asociación de Escritores de Venezuela (Writers Association from Venezuela), and worked for the Ministry of Education.

His studies on "Barroco de Indias" (the term that he coined to talk about the baroque from Hispanic America) are very influential among the general study of Baroque.

He received the National Prize for Literature in 1954. He taught at Columbia University, New York.

== Personal life ==
He was twice married, first to a Chilean lady, Isabel Cento, with whom he had his only daughter, named Delia Isabel Picón de Morles. He later married Venezuelan Beatriz Otáñez.

== Works ==
- Las nuevas corrientes de arte (1917)
- Buscando el camino (1920)
- Mundo imaginario (1927)
- Hispanoamérica: posición crítica, literatura y actitud americana: sentido americano del disparate y sitio de una generación (1931)
- Registro de huéspedes (1934)
- Intuición de Chile y otros ensayos en busca de una conciencia histórica (1935)
- Preguntas a Europa (1938)
- Cinco discursos sobre pasado y presente de la nación venezolana (1940)
- Odisea de Tierra Firme: relatos de Venezuela (1940)
- Un viaje y seis retratos (1940)
- Formación y proceso de la literatura venezolana (1940)
- Viaje al amanecer (1943)
- De la Conquista a la Independencia (México, 1944)
- Biografía de Francisco de Miranda (1946)
- Formación y Proceso de la Literatura Venezolana (1947)
- Comprensión de Venezuela (1949)
- Pedro Claver, el Santo de los Esclavos (1950)
- Dependencia e Independencia en la Historia hispanoamericana (1952)
- Los días de Cipriano Castro (1953)
- Crisis, cambio, tradición (1955)
- Regreso de tres mundos: un hombre en su generación (1959)
- Los Malos salvajes. Civilización y política contemporáneas (1962)
- Art Latino-Américain à Paris (1962)
- Hora y Deshora. Temas humanísticos; nombres y figuras, viajes y lugares (1963)
- Tres sonetos del desengaño (1965)
- Prólogo al Instituto Nacional de Cultural (posthumous) (1965)

== See also ==
- Venezuela
- Venezuelan literature
