= Guillermo Morón =

Venezuelan writer and historian (1926–2021)

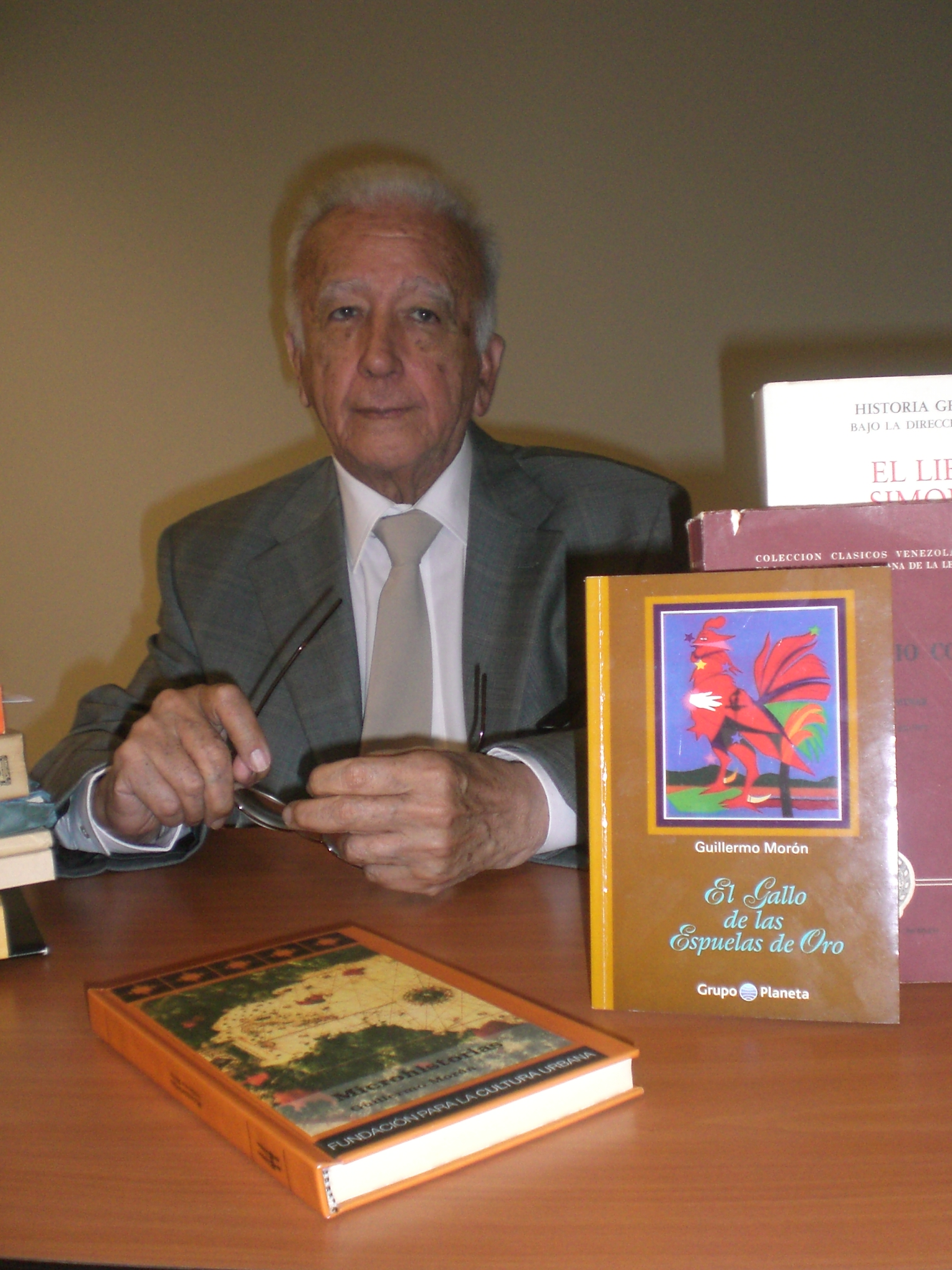
- Morón in 2009
- Born: 8 February 1926; Carora, Venezuela
- Died: 19 November 2021 (aged 95); Caracas, Venezuela
- Occupations: Historian, writer
- Writing career
- Period: 1955–2021
- Genres: Novel, history, short story, fable, essay
- Subject: History of Venezuela

Guillermo Morón Montero (8 February 1926 – 19 November 2021) was a Venezuelan writer and historian. Guillermo Morón has won awards including the Municipal Prize of Literature (Narrative mention) (1987), and the National Prize for Literature (1990).

== Published works ==
- El libro de la fe (1955)
- Los Cronistas y la Historia (1957)
- Los borradores de un Meditador (1958)
- Historia de Venezuela (1960)
- Historia política de José Ortega y Gasset (1960)
- Imágenes y nombres (1972)
- Microhistorias (1980)
- Textos sobre Lisandro Alvarado (1981)
- Historia de Francisco y otras maravillas (1982)
- El gallo de las espuelas de oro (1984)
- Homenaje a Don Rómulo Gallegos (1984)
- Ciertos animales criollos (1985)
- Los más antiguos (1986)
- Son españoles (1989)
- Los presidentes de Venezuela (1993)
- El catálogo de las mujeres (1994)
- Patiquines, pavorreales y y notables (2002)
- Memorial de agravios (2005)

== See also ==
- Venezuela
- Venezuelan literature
