= Luz Machado =

Venezuelan political activist (1916–1999)

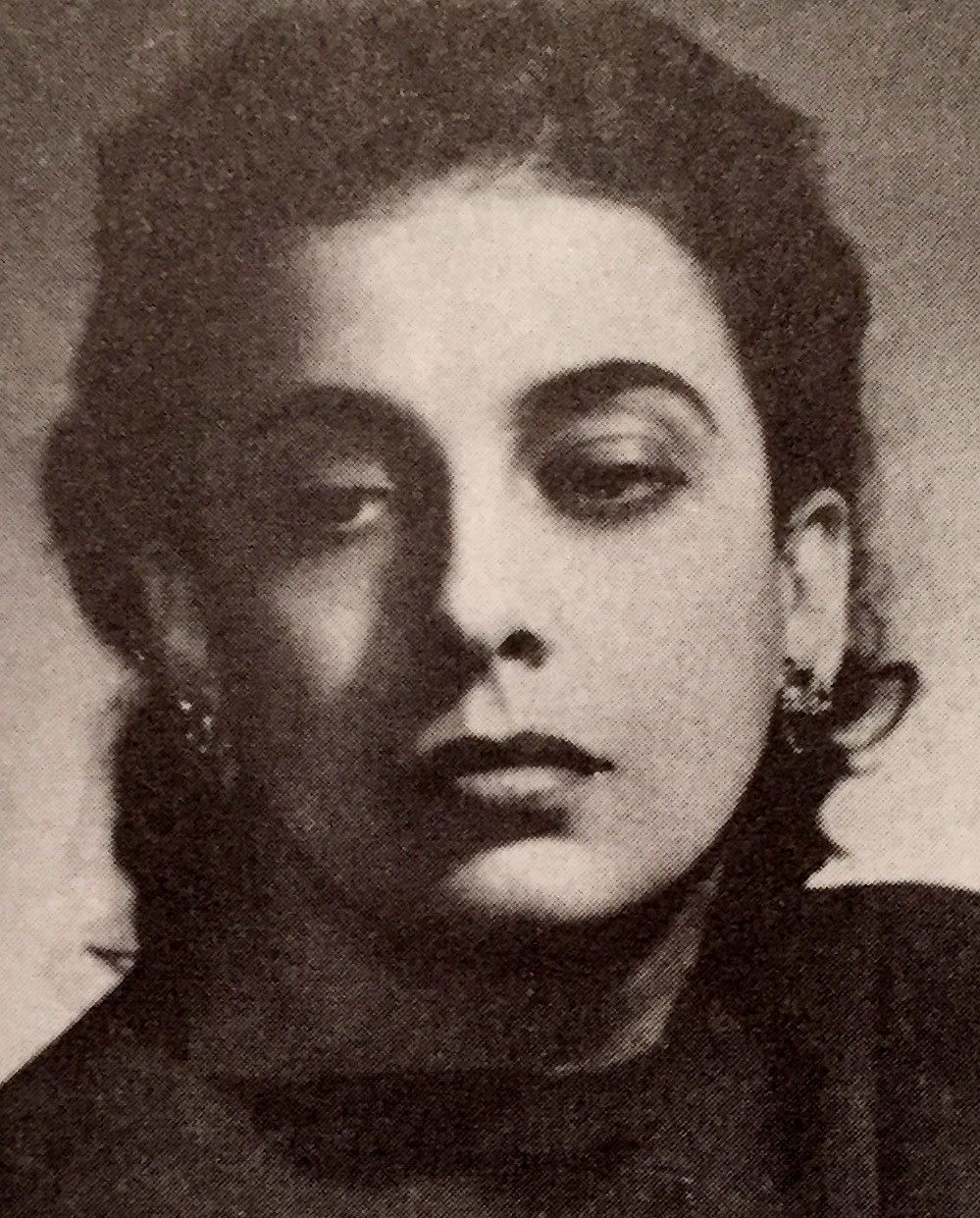
Luz Machado

Luz Machado (Ciudad Bolívar, February 3, 1916 – August 11, 1999, pseudonym: Ágata Cruz) was a Venezuelan political activist, journalist and poet. She founded the Circle of Venezuelan Writers (Círculo Escritores de Venezuela) and was a member of Bolivarian Society (Sociedad Bolivariana). She is a recipient of the National Prize for Literature.

== Books ==
- Ronda
- Variaciones en tono de amor
- Vaso de resplandor
- Canto al Orinoco
- Sonetos nobles y sentimentales
- Sonetos a la sombra de Sor Juana Inés de la Cruz
- Retratos y tormentos
- Crónicas sobre Guayana

== Prizes ==
- Medalla de Plata, Asociación de Escritores Venezolanos.
- Premio Nacional de Literatura de Venezuela, 1987.
- Orden Francisco Miranda, 1993
