= Santiago Key Ayala =

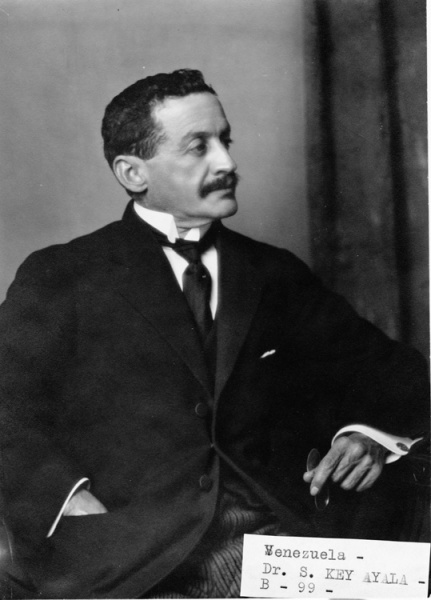
Santiago Key Ayala

Santiago Key Ayala (Caracas, April 25, 1874 – Caracas, August 21, 1959) was a historian, writer and diplomat, and is considered one of the most important Venezuelan intellectuals from the first half of the 20th century.

== Biography ==
Santiago Key Ayala was born in Caracas on April 25, 1874. His parents were Fernando Key Rodríguez and Ana Ayala Anzola. He studied philosophy, math, and natural sciences at the Central University of Venezuela. At this time he began his literary career by writing for the journal El Cojo Ilustrado. He then studied engineering and political science, and wrote articles for the magazine Cosmópolis, a publication that helped spread modernismo in Venezuela. Although Key Ayala was at first influenced by the ideas of modernismo, he gradually moved away from the movement, finding his own voice in a prose more in line with his academic and classic spirit.

In the 1940s, Key Ayala collected all of the work he had written in a few volumes, which included monographs, articles, as well as research and discourse that had been previously published in the form of brochures and booklets. Alongside his intellectual work, he held various positions as an officer of the Ministry of Foreign Affairs, both in Venezuela and abroad. One of these positions was Venezuela's Envoy Extraordinary and Minister Plenipotentiary to the United States in Italy in 1936. Another diplomatic function was to represent the country at the Plenipotentiary Conference for boundary issues with Colombia (1920-1921). He was also a delegate to the Assembly of the League of Nations, the Permanent Court of International Justice, and the Pan-American Conference in Havana. In 1914 he became a member of the Venezuelan Academy of Language and in 1916 he joined the National Academy of History. As a historian, he stands out for his research on Simon Bolivar and other Latin American figures. His books include: Vida ejemplar de Simón Bolívar (for which he obtained the Municipal Prize for Literature in 1942), Luz de Bolívar and Cuba y Marti.

In addition to writing about historical figures, he was greatly interested in literary research and criticism, which prompted him to write the book Bajo el signo del Ávila (1949), about some contemporary writers of his time, including Manuel Díaz Rodríguez, Pedro Emilio Coll, Andrés Bello, Aristides Rojas and Juan Antonio Pérez Bonalde. Since 1933 he wrote a series of books about Venezuelan history, including Series hemero-bibliográficas, Aluvión hemerográfico, Cateos de bibliografía. In 1950 he was awarded the National Prize for Literature. His selected works were published in 1955 in a book titled "Obras Selectas" (Ediciones EDIME, 1245 pages).

Santiago Key Ayala published his work under the name "S. Key-Ayala" or "Santiago Key-Ayala", which were strictly not a pseudonyms but simply variants of his actual name.

Key Ayala died in Caracas on August 21, 1959.

== Partial list of works ==
- Bajo el signo del Ávila (1949)
- Obras selectas (1955)
- Series hemero-bibliográficas (1933)
- Aluvión hemerográfico
- El juego del papagayo: conferencias de Elías Martel (1955)
- Entre Gil Fortoul y Lisandro Alvarado (1945)
- Adolfo Ernst: (1832-1899) (1955)
- Las noches del Panteón (1954)
- La bandera de Miranda: Bicentenario de Francisco de Miranda, 1750-1950 (1956)
- Monosílabos triliteros de la lengua castellana: motivos de conversación (1952)
- Discurso de... Jesús Arocha Moreno... y... Santiago Key-Ayala (1951)
- Por qué Bolívar no libertó a Cuba (1950)
- Eduardo Blanco y la genesis de "Venezuela heroica." (1920)
- Bolivariana (1933)
- Simón Bolívar (1973)
- Obra inducida de Lisandro Alvarado: (piezas de su archivo) (1958)
- La descendencia lexicográfica de Bolívar (1944)
- Uno que regresa: retrato histórico de Páez (1949)
- Los nombres de las esquinas de Caracas: tradiciones y tradicionistas (1927)
- Cateos de bibliografía
