= Jeremy Munday =

British linguist and translation scholar (born 1960)

Jeremy Munday (18 May 1960) is a British linguist and translation scholar. He once worked as a scholar in translation studies at the University of Leeds and he also works as a French–English and French–English translator.He has been an Emeritus Professor at the University of Leeds since his early retirement in 2022.

== eSelected publications ==
- 2012: Introducing Translation Studies: Theories and applications. Routledge, Abingdon/New York 2012, 3rd edition, ISBN 978-0415584890
- 2012: Evaluation in Translation: A study of critical points in translator decision-making. Routledge, 2012, ISBN 978-0415577694
- 2008: The Routledge Companion to Translation Studies (Hrsg.). Routledge, London/New York 2012, ISBN 978-0415396417
- 2008: Introducing Translation Studies: Theories and applications. Routledge, Abingdon/New York 2008, 2nd edition, ISBN 978-0415396936
- 2007: Style and Ideology in Translation: Latin American writing in English. Routledge, New York 2007, ISBN 978-0415872904
- 2007: Translation as Intervention (ed.). Continuum and IATIS, London 2007, ISBN 978-0826495198
- 2004: Basil Hatim, Jeremy Munday: Translation: An advanced resource book. Routledge, London/New York 2004, ISBN 978-0415283069
- 2001: Introducing Translation Studies: Theories and applications. Routledge, London/New York 2001, ISBN 978-0415229265

== Translations ==
- 2002: Sánchez, Javier García: Induráin: A tempered passion. Mousehold, Norwich 2002, ISBN 978-1874739234
- 1998: Ortega, Julio, Carlos Fuentes (ed.): Picador Book of Latin American Short Stories. Picador/Macmillan, London 1998 (translation of 15 short stories), ISBN 978-0330339544
- 1996: Garmendia, Salvador: Memories of Altagracia. Peter Owen, London 1996
