= Juan Sánchez Peláez =

Venezuelan poet (1922–2003)

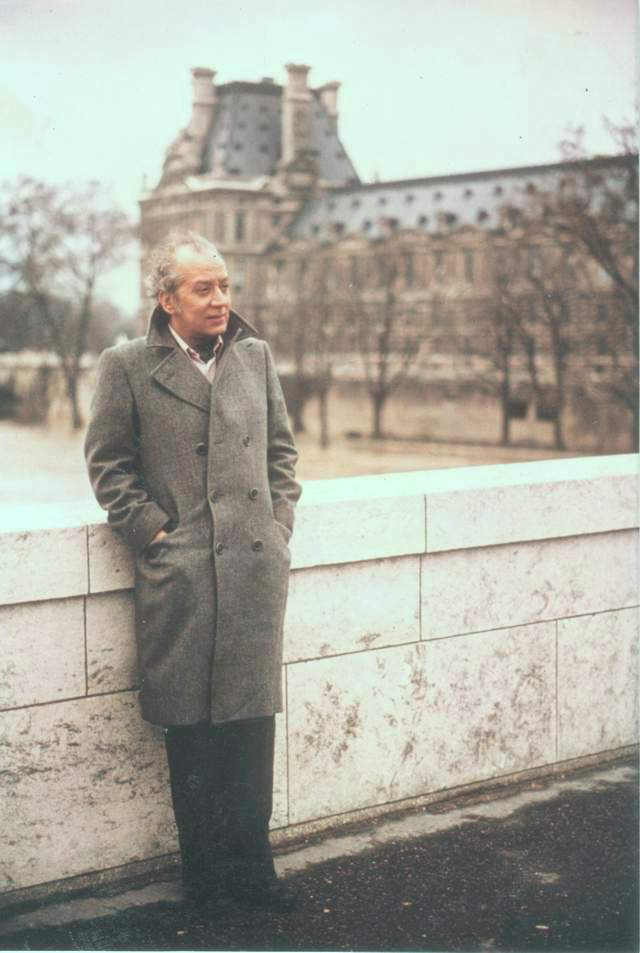
- Photo of Juan Sánchez Peláez in Paris, France by Ednodio Quintero
- Born: September 25, 1922; Altagracia de Orituco, Guárico, Venezuela
- Died: November 20, 2003 (aged 81); Caracas, Venezuela
- Occupation: Poet
- Writing career
- Language: Spanish
- Notable awards: National Prize for Literature (Venezuela)

Juan Sánchez Peláez (September 25, 1922 in Altagracia de Orituco, Guárico – November 20, 2003 in Caracas) was a Venezuelan poet and National Prize winner for Literature in 1975.

== Biography ==
Juan Sánchez Peláez was born in Altagracia de Orituco but his family soon moved to Caracas, where he attended primary and secondary schools. He attended university in Santiago, Chile where he befriended the poets of the surrealist group Mandrágora. He published his first poems in their magazine and it was through this encounter that his lifelong interest in surrealism began. Upon returning to Caracas, he published Elena y los elementos in 1951. Elena y los elementos had a profound effect on Venezuelan poetry, outlining a distinctly Venezuelan form of surrealism that influenced the generation of avant-garde poets who emerged in the 1960s. This book was published in a fiftieth anniversary edition by Monte Ávila Editores after he was awarded the title of Doctor Honoris Causa from the Universidad de los Andes in Mérida in 2001.

He worked as a teacher in Maturín, Maracaibo and the state of Sucre. He was cultural attache to the Embassy of Venezuela in Colombia. He also lived in Paris and Madrid. In 1969 he was a Fellow at The University of Iowa's International Writing Program, after which he lived in New York City for two years. Sánchez Peláez was a contributor to numerous periodicals: Papel Literario (El Nacional), Zona Franca, Eco (Colombia) Revista Poesia (Valencia), Señal (Paris), Tabla Redonda, among others.

He also translated the works of American poet laureate Mark Strand from English to Spanish.

The outstanding feature of his poetry is the tension between mysticism and eroticism. Sánchez Peláez always looked at his erotic objects as distant entities, separate from the mundane through the metaphysical veil. Ludovico Silva, in his "Juan Sanchez Pelaez, The real and illusionary" states:

Juan Sánchez Peláez was the first Venezuelan poet who introduced into our poetry, consciousness of the secrecy of man in the world and his distressing certainty of being thrown into time as a foreigner, without his consent (...) His existential rebellion is a discerning attitude, a lyrical excitement, a ritual of introspection. Silent. He accepts the world but does not understand it and his flexible language, capable of expressing nuances of a visionary and deeply artistic sensibility, constitutes a renewal.

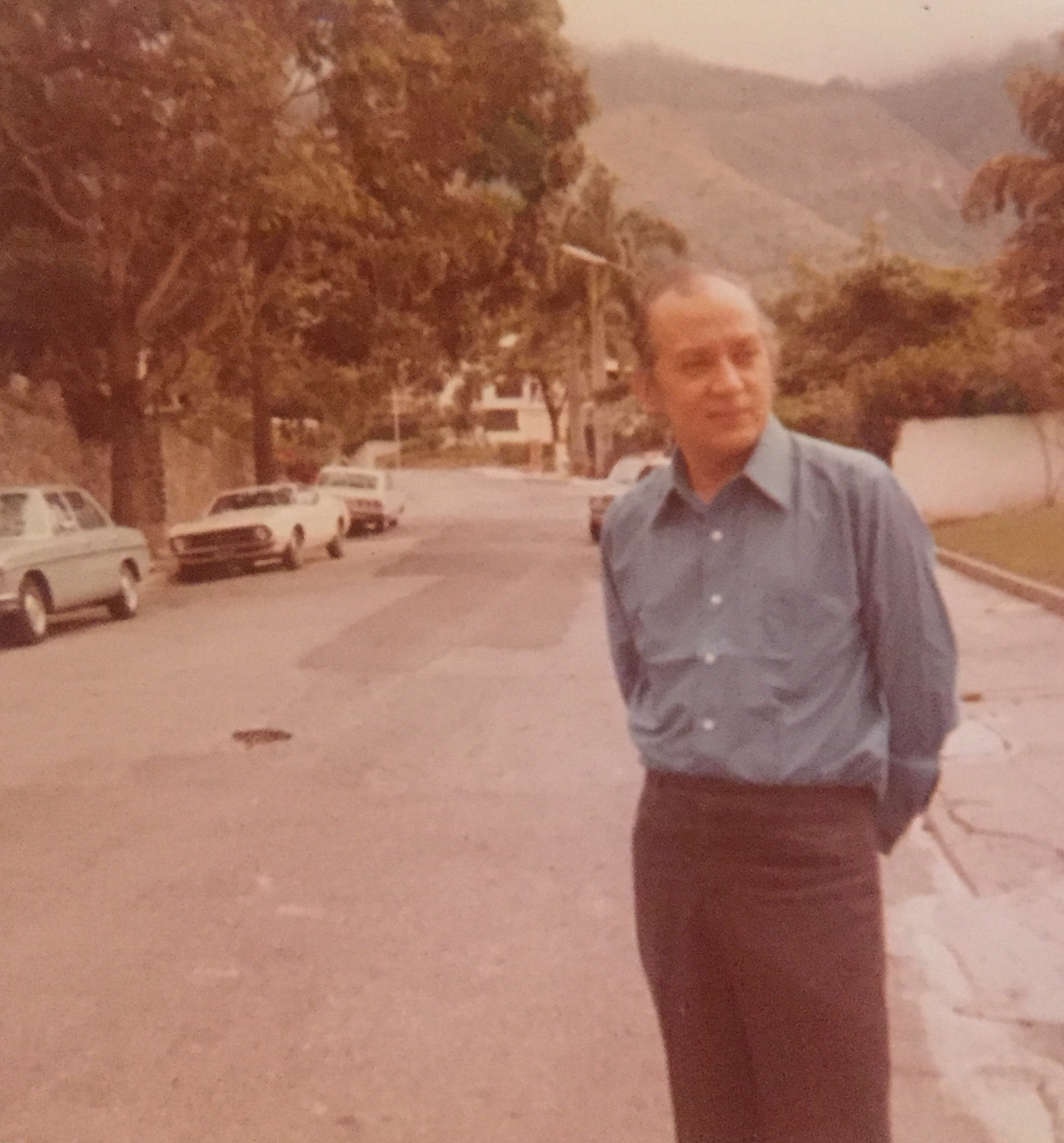
Juan Sánchez Peláez in the Alta Mira neighborhood of Caracas, Venezuela. Photo by Raquel Sanchez

Juan Liscano, in his Panorama de la Literatura actual (Overview of Current Literature), 1973, states: "Sánchez Peláez through his open writing and his existential attitude created a new path in our poetry."

In 2022, several events were held to honor the centennial of his birth.

== Family ==
Pelaez married American painter and sculptor Ellen Lapidus Stern and had two daughters, Tamar Meisel, a medical coach and Raquel Sanchez, an artist, and licensed social worker. Both daughters and grandchildren live in Israel. After his divorce, he married Argentinian editor Malena Coelho (1937-2022). The couple was together for over 40 years until his passing.

== Works ==
- Elena y los elementos (English: Helen and the Elements), Caracas, Tipografía Garrido, 1951, 46 pages. ISBN 978-9800111536
- Animal de costumbre (English: Creature of Habit), Editorial Suma, 1959, 30 pages.
- Filiación oscura (English: Dark Affiliation), Caracas, Editorial Arte, 1966, 41 pages.
- Un día sea (English: May It Be One Day), Caracas, Monte Ávila Editores, 1969, 142 pages. OCLC 6101556
- Rasgos comunes (English: Common Features), Caracas, Monte Ávila Editores, 1975, 72 pages.
- Por cuál causa o nostalgia (English: For What Cause or Nostalgia), Caracas, Fondo Editorial Fundarte, 1981, 69 pages.
- Aire sobre el aire (English: Air Over the Air), Caracas, Tierra de Gracia Editores, 1989, 35 pages.
- Obra poética (English: Poetic Work), Barcelona, Editorial Lumen, 2004, 260 pages. ISBN 978-8426414366

== Translations ==
- Excerpts from Creature of Habit, translated by Guillermo Parra, InTranslation, The Brooklyn Rail, December 2009.
- Two Poems from Helen and the Elements (1951), translated by Guillermo Parra, Otoliths, April 2010.
- Air On the Air Translated from Spanish by Guillermo Parra, 2016, Published by Black Square Editions
