= Juan Beroes =

Venezuelan poet (1914–1975)

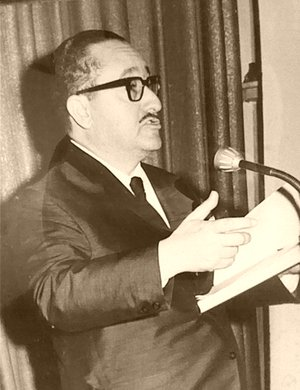
Juan Beroes

Juan Beroes (September 24, 1914 – August 3, 1975) was a Venezuelan poet.

== Biography ==
He was born on September 24, 1914, in San Cristóbal, Táchira, Venezuela. He gained a political Science degree from the Central University of Venezuela in 1940. He contributed articles to the newspapers El Nacional (Caracas) since 1945, El Tiempo (Bogotá) between 1946-1947, and the Revista Nacional de Cultura of Caracas (the National Culture Magazine). He served as a diplomat and cultural attache at the Venezuelan embassies in Colombia, Ecuador and Italy.

He represented Venezuela at the Third Biennial International Poetry Contest in Knokke-Zoute (Belgium). In 1947, he won the Municipal Poetry Prize with his work Prisión Terrena (Earthly Prison). In 1948, he won the literary prize of the magazine Contrapunto and in 1957 he was awarded the National Prize for Literature for his work Materia de Eternidad (Matter of Eternity).
