= Ana Enriqueta Terán =

Venezuelan poet

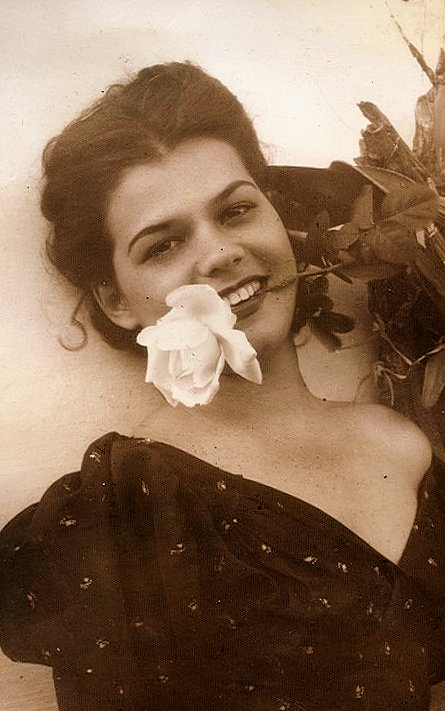
Ana Enriqueta Terán

Ana Enriqueta Terán (4 May 1918, Valera, Trujillo State – 18 December 2017, Valencia, Carabobo) was a Venezuelan poet. She was one of the best-known Venezuelan poets, especially because of her peculiar wordplay. Terán has written in several publications and all her works are compiled in Casa de hablas (1991). She won the National Prize for Literature in 1989.

== Work ==
- Al norte de la sangre (1946)
- Presencia terrena (1949)
- Verdor secreto (1949)
- De bosque a bosque (1970)
- El libro de los oficios (1975)
- Libro de Jajó (1980-1987)
- Música con pie de salmo (1985)
- Casa de hablas (1991)
- Alabatros (1992)
- Antología poética (2005)
- Construcciones sobre basamentos de niebla (Monte Ávila Editores, 2006)
- Piedra de habla (2014) Biblioteca Ayacucho.
