= Mi delirio sobre el Chimborazo =

1822 poem by Simón Bolívar

- by Simón Bolívar
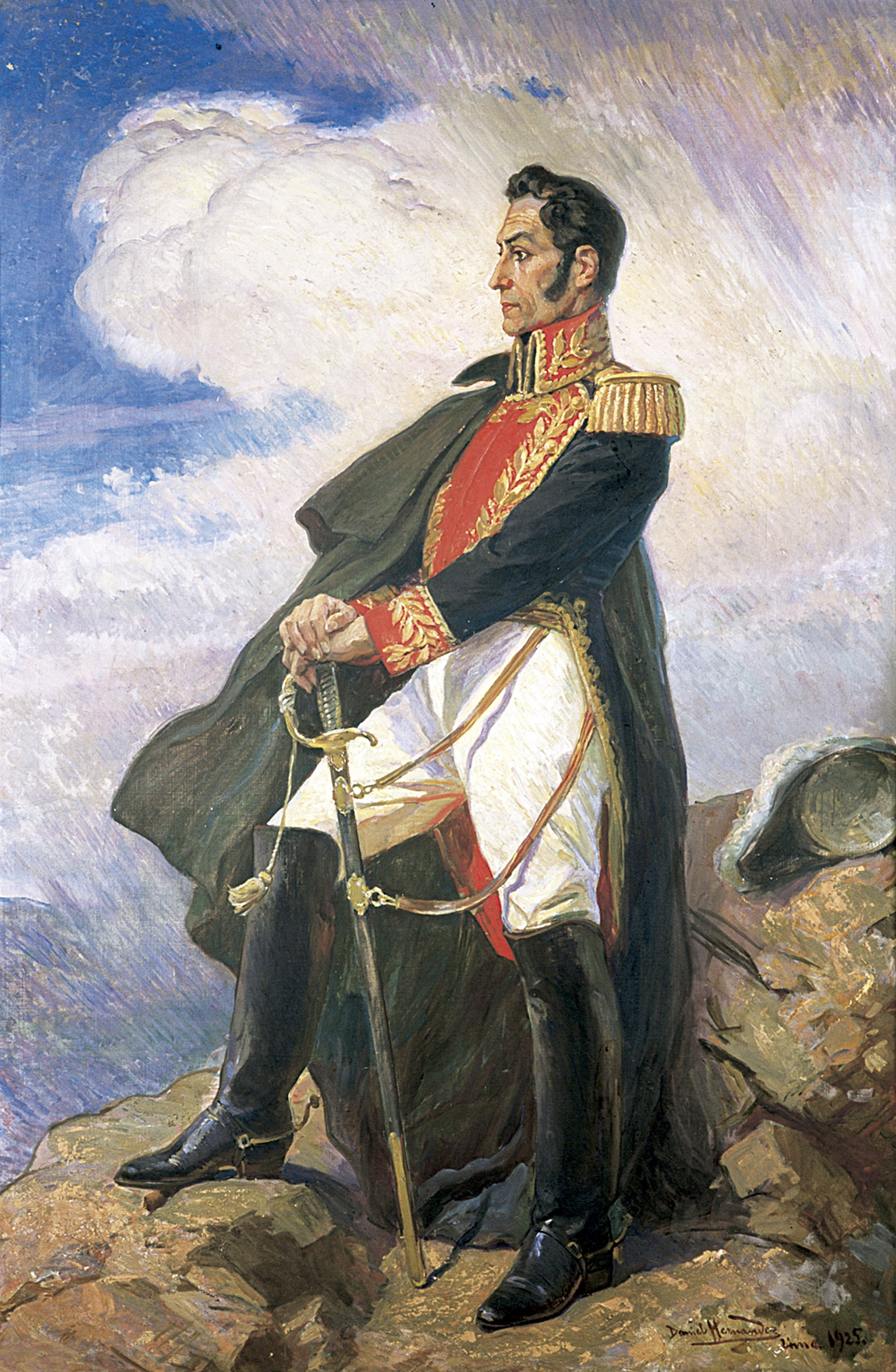
- Daniel Hernández Morillo's 1925 portrait of Bolívar in Peru
- Language: Spanish
- Genre: Romantic poetry
- Form: Prose poem
- Publication date: 1833
- Mi delirio sobre el Chimborazo at Spanish Wikisource

Mi delirio sobre el Chimborazo (English: My delirium on Chimborazo) is a Romantic-era prose poem in the perspective of, and believed to have been written by, South American Libertador Simón Bolívar. First appearing in print in 1833, it is thought he wrote it in 1822 or 1823. Asides from a critique he wrote of La victoria de Junín, it is his only literary work.

== Content ==
The delirio recounts the experience of its narrator while nearing the summit of Mount Chimborazo, which he climbs, buoyed by the spirit of the "God of Colombia". He is shown by a personification of Time the scale of his accomplishments and future of Latin America, at which the narrator expresses ecstasy. Then, the narrator awakens and writes the poem.

The text uses the geography of South America, like the Orinoco, the Atlantic coast, and Chimborazo, then believed to be the tallest mountain in the world, to populate a mythic setting with Time (Cronos), Iris, Bellona, and the unspecified God of Colombia.

It is not known if Bolívar actually read any Romantic writers. However, in his youth, he received instruction in writers that inspired them, including Dante, Shakespeare, Cervantes, Goethe, and the philosophy of Rousseau. Pedro Grases identified a fragment in the text taken from Los Sueños by Francisco de Quevedo, who he says that Bolívar had almost certainly read.

== Publication and authorship ==
The poem was first published by Francisco Javier Yanes and Cristóbal Mendoza in an appendix of a collection of documents pertaining to the South American wars of independence in 1833. It appeared again in print in 1842. The original manuscript is unknown. The poem was widely reproduced as a work of Bolívar, despite lack of verifiability. Two copies exist dated to 13 October 1822, one from a colonel and friend of Bolívar which was found in Quito in 1945 and the other in the Imperial Museum of Brazil, recovered from a Colombian colonel.

=== Time of authorship ===
The poem is dated to the time between Ecuador's falling into Patriot hands in 1822 and Bolívar's arrival in Peru in 1833. Aware of his accomplishments to remove the Spanish to that point, and the further victories to come in Peru, Bolívar wrote the poem at some point while in Ecuador. Some academics say he wrote it in Riobamba in 1823, and another theory says he was in Loja in 1822.

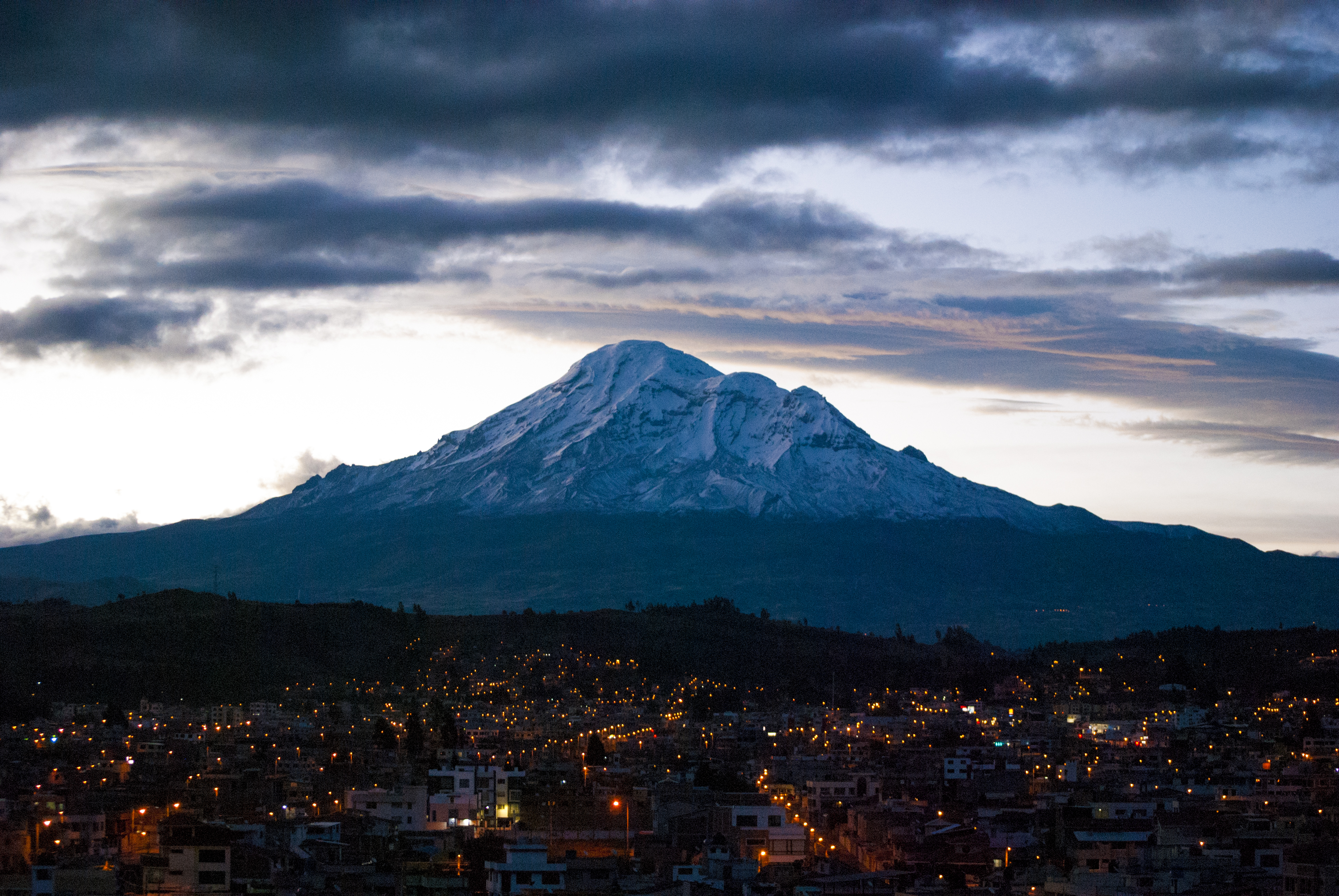
Mount Chimborazo seen from Riobamba, where the poem may have been written

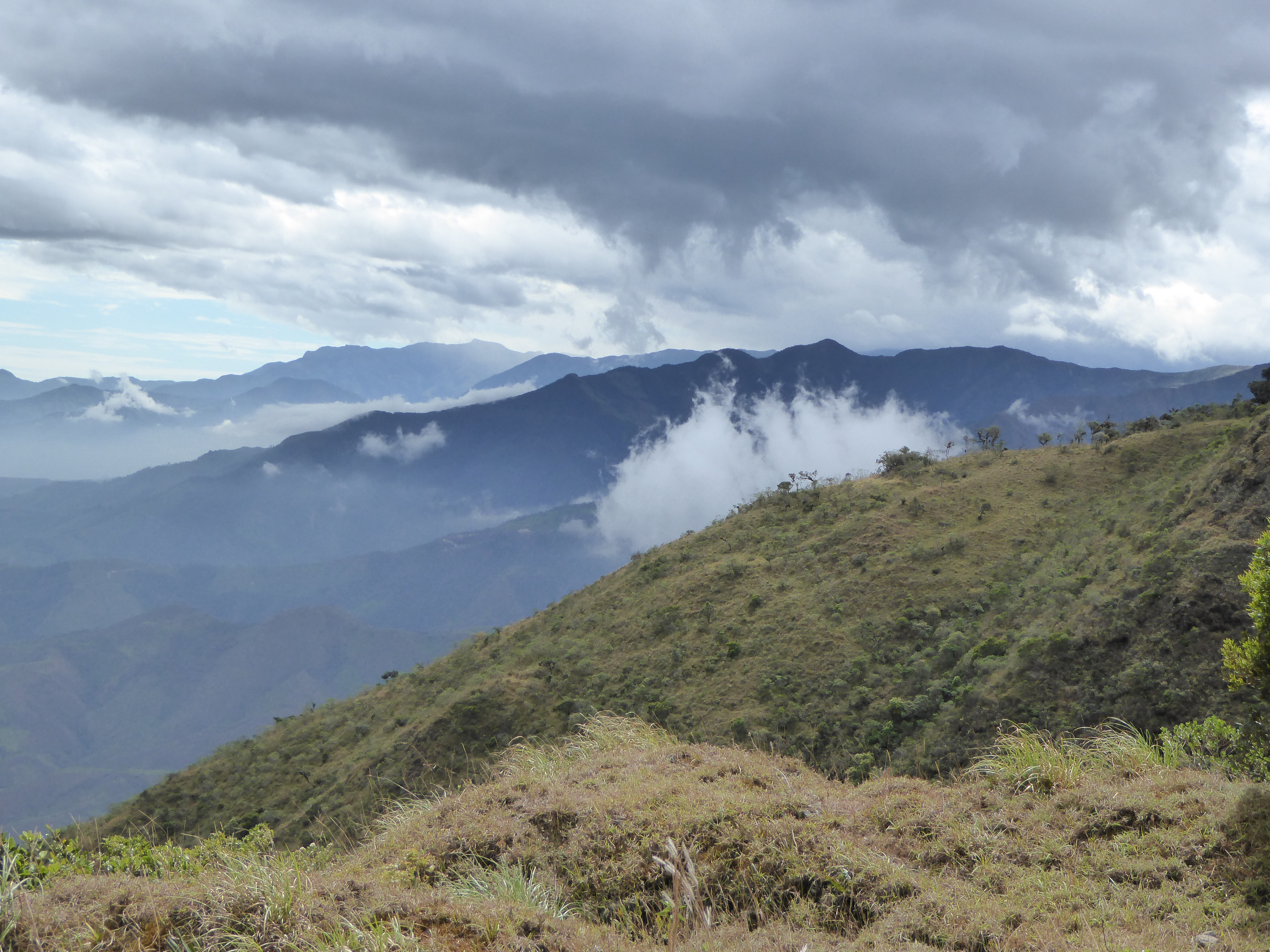
A view near Loja, another possible site of its composition

Pro-Bolívar historian Ángel Grisanti aimed to derive biographical details from the delirio. He dated it to 5 July 1822, when he claimed Bolívar, after attending a banquet in a village near Chimborazo, began climbing the mountain, but fainted on a stone due to altitude sickness, then receiving the vision described in the poem.

== Critical analysis ==
Germán Arciniegas wrote that the poem is primarily a work of self-messianism, linking his feats to divinely ordained predestination. Ronald Briggs observed continuity between Bolivar's oath on the Mons Sacer to liberate the Americas from Spanish rule and a new one on Chimborazo, where the height difference between the two mountains shows the promise of the American cause as superseding the heights of the Roman Empire. His claim to have summited the mountain, thereby out-climbing Alexander von Humboldt in his attempt to climb that mountain, is meant to signify the advancement of a liberated America beyond knowledge acquired in the Spanish colonial era.

The Romantic identity of the poem is expressed through its use of mountaineering as a device for enlightenment and modernity, as well as its treatment of self, truth, and justice, using an authoritative tone to deliver the narrator's enlightened truths. The use of mountains as a vehicle for the sublime is a theme seen in other Romantic works as well.

Pedro Grases believed that the poem is almost certainly an authentic creation of Bolívar, identifying predecessors for the style of the work in previous speeches and letters, including his letter to Simón Rodríguez about Chimborazo in 1824, which uses short, passionate sentences, a speech delivered in Potosí on 26 October 1825 expressing awareness of the magnitude of his work, and the Angostura Address, which exhibits ecstasy for the future to come, as well as other examples in which Bolívar addresses the accomplishments of the Patriots and accomplishments to come with a surge of energy, passion, and poetic language.

Ángel Grisanti called it "the most profoundly lyrical of Bolívar's writings and one of the most beautiful pieces of literature in the Spanish language."
