= Mario Briceño Iragorry =

Venezuelan writer and politician

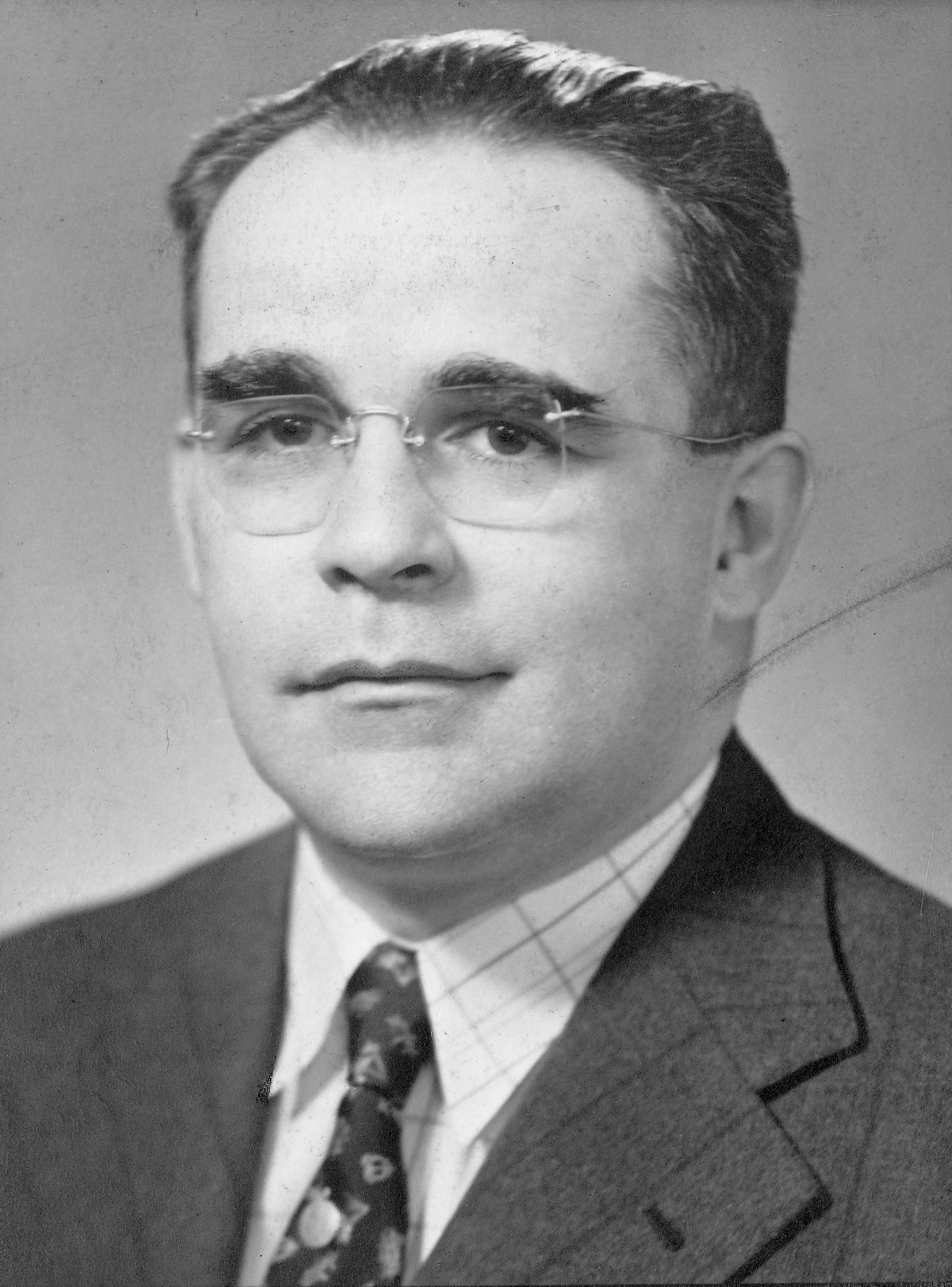
Mario Briceño Iragorry

Mario Briceño Iragorry (Trujillo, 15 September 1897 – Caracas, 16 June 1958), was a Venezuelan intellectual and cultural analyst. He was also a notable writer, politician, journalist, lawyer, historian, diplomat, and teacher.

He won the National Prize for Literature in 1948. The Mario Briceño Iragorry Municipality in Aragua is named for him.

== Bibliography ==
- Horas Hours (1921)
- Motivos Motives (1922)
- Ventanas en la noche Windows in the Night (1925)
- Lecturas Venezolanas Venezuelan Lectures (1926)
- Tapices de Historia Patria History Homeland Tapestries (1933)
- Temas Inconclusos Unfinished topics (1942)
- Sentido y Ámbito del Congreso de Angostura Meaning and Scope of the Congress of Angostura (1943)
- Relación geográfica de la Provincia de Cuyas Geographical relation to the Cuyas Province(1947)
- El Caballo de Ledesma The Horse from Ledesma (1951)
- Trujillo
- Sentido y presencia de Miranda Sense and Presence of Miranda (1950)
- La Tragedia de Peñalver The Tragedy of Peñalver (1951)
- Mensaje sin Destino Message without Destination (1951)
- Por la ciudad hacia el mundo For the city to the World (1957)
- Ideario Político Political Ideology (1958)
