= Pedro Grases =

Venezuelan writer

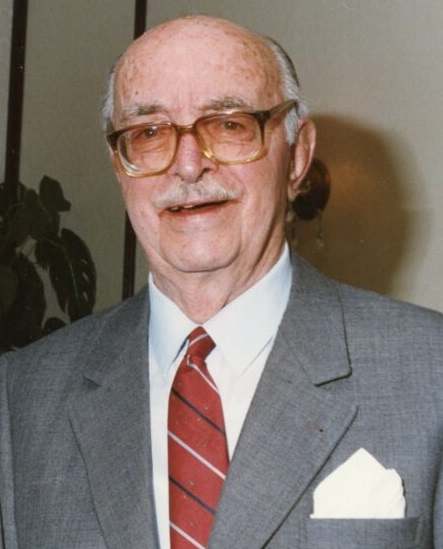
Pedro Grases

Pedro Grases (Vilafranca del Penedès, Catalonia, Spain, September 17, 1909 – Caracas, Venezuela, August 15, 2004) was a Venezuelan writer, historian and literary critic. He won the National Prize for Literature in 1993.

== See also ==
- Literature of Venezuela
