= Carlos Noguera =

Venezuelan writer and psychologist

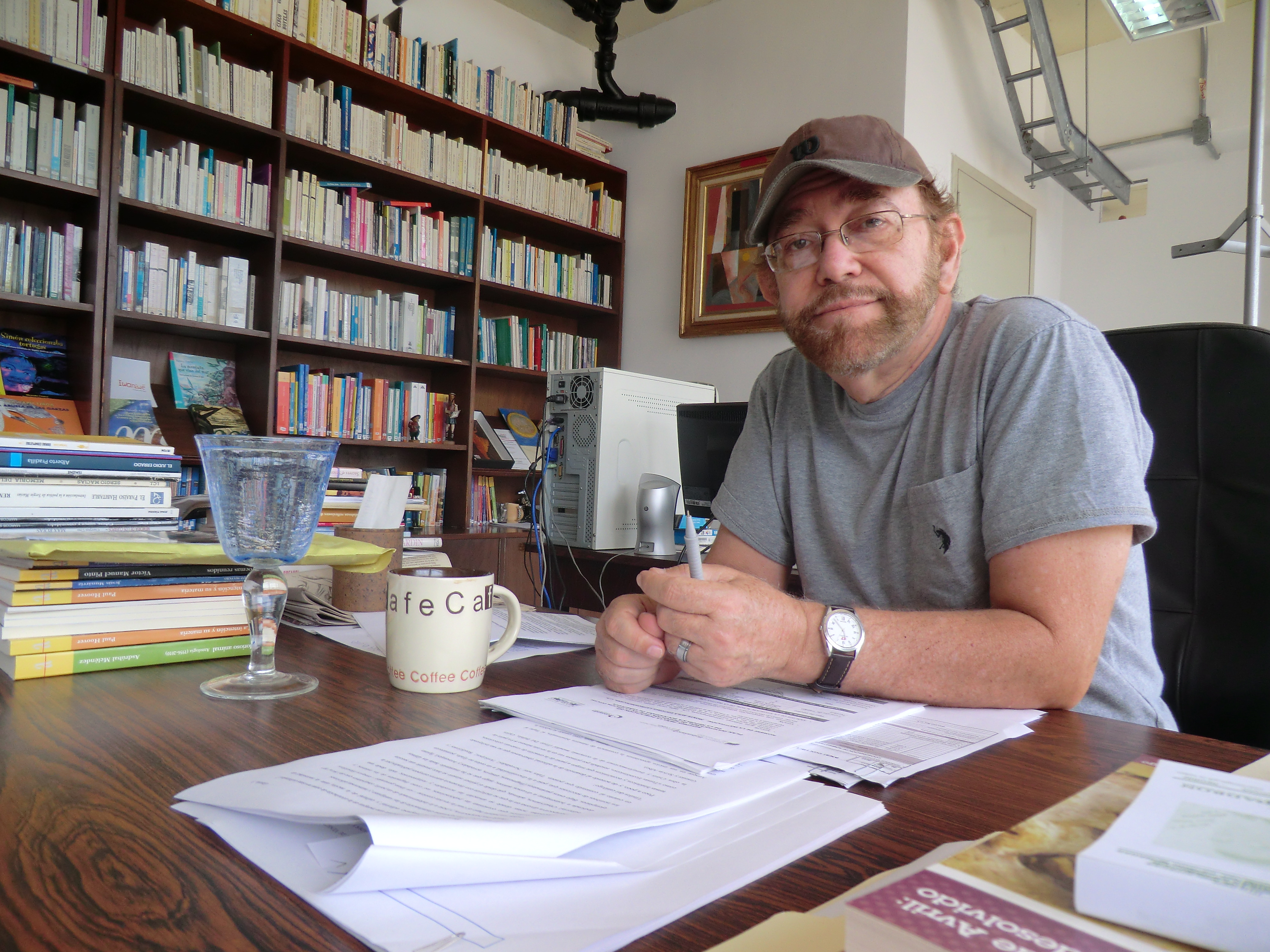
- Noguera in 2012
- Born: 28 October 1943; Tinaquillo, Cojedes, Venezuela
- Died: 3 February 2015 (aged 71); Caracas
- Occupations: writer, psychologist
- Writing career
- Period: 1965-2015
- Notable work: Juegos bajo la luna (1994)

Signature
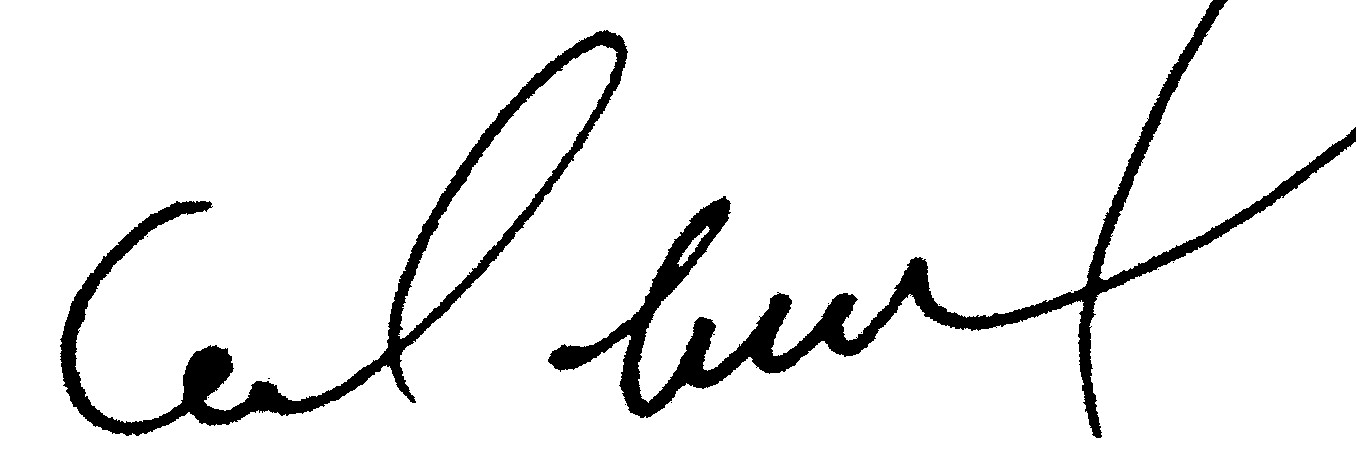

Carlos Noguera (28 October 1943 – 3 February 2015) was a Venezuelan writer and psychologist.

== Biography ==
He graduated from the Central University of Venezuela, and was the president of Monte Ávila Editores (Publishers) between 2003 until his death.

He has written as much poetry as stories, and is the winner of various prizes, such as the National Prize for Literature in 2003, and the National Fiction Award from the National Council of Culture (CONAC) in 1994. His works have been translated into 3 languages, and he has also written essays about psychology. His novels include Historias de la calle Lincoln (1971), Juegos bajo la Luna (1994), which was made into a movie in 2000 by the Mexican film director Mauricio Walerstein, and La flor escrita (2003). He was the editor-in-chief of the "Revista Nacional de Cultura" (the National Culture Magazine).

== Work ==
=== Poetry ===
- Laberintos (1965)
- Eros y Palas (1967)
- Dos libros (1999)

=== Narrative ===
- Historias de la calle Lincoln (1971)
- Inventando los días (1979)
- Juegos bajo la luna (1994)
- La flor escrita (2003)
- Los cristales de la noche (2005)
- Crónica de los Fuegos Celestes (2010)

=== Essay ===
- El adolescente caraqueño (en coautoría con Esther Escalona Palacios, 1989)
- Ya no eres una niña, ya no eres un niño (en coautoría con Juliana Boersner, 2004)
