= Andreína Álvarez =

Venezuelan actress and singer

- Born: January 19, 1979 (age 47); Caracas
- Occupations: Actress, entertainer, comedian, singer

Andreína María Álvarez Medina (born January 19, 1979, in Caracas, Venezuela) is a Venezuelan actress, TV host and comedian.

She is remembered for being the host of programs such as Ají Picante and Súper Sábado Sensacional, and a comedian on programs such as RCTV Radio Rochela, Cheverísimo and ¡A que te ríes! from Venevisión.

== Works ==
=== Acting ===
- Radio Rochela
- Mujer con Pantalones - Linda Bombón (2004-2005)
- El gato tuerto - Ana Montes (2007-2008)
- Cheverísimo (2004-2020)
- ¡A que te ríes! (2010-2016)
- El Show del Vacilón (2012-present)
- El Show de joselo (2000-2010)
- Sal y pimienta (2000-2006)

=== Productions ===
- Ají Picante - Main host
- Bailando con los Abuelos - Co-host (2008)
- Súper sábado sensacional - Invited host (2008–Present)
- El Show del Vacilón - Co-host (2014)
- Buscando una estrella - Co-host (2014)
- TV Libre - Host (2016)

=== Theater ===
- Se busca hombre
- Cata de Hombres
- Mujeres infieles
- Despedida de Casadas
