= José Antonio de Armas Chitty =

Venezuelan historian, poet, chronicler, essayist, biographer and researcher

- J. A. de Armas Chitty
- Born: 30 November 1908; Caracas, Venezuela
- Died: 6 October 1995 (aged 86); Caracas, Venezuela

José Antonio de Armas Chitty (30 November 1908 – 6 October 1995) was a Venezuelan historian, poet, chronicler, essayist, biographer and researcher.

== Biography ==
Armas Chitty was born in Caracas on 30 November 1908. When he was six years old, he moved to Santa María de Ipire, a town in Guárico state, and lived there until he was 27.

He enrolled for the Anthropology and History Institute of the Central University of Venezuela in 1949. Since then he was Head of the Colonial History and the Republican History Departments of the same institute. He was a lecturer of the Central University from 1956. In 1950 he was the Director of Publications of the Venezuelan Council for the Child, held that position until 1952. From 1952 to 1964, he was Supervisor of Cultural Section of the Public Relationships Department of the Creole Petroleum Corporation. In 1971, he was the Chief of Minister of Education's Secretary. De Armas Chitty wrote articles for many newspapers and magazines in Venezuela, as well as Lima, Buenos Aires and Madrid, was a columnist on the Caracas daily El Nacional for 15 years. He was also member of the Venezuelan Academy of History from 1957, being chosen on 10 January 1979.

== Awards ==
- 1945: National Award of Romances.
- 1946: Award of Elite Magazine for the sonnet Homenaje a Ciudad Bolívar in honour of that city during its bicentenary.
- 1947: House of Guárico Award for the poem Canto a la Mujer y a la Tierra.
- 1950: Municipal Award of Prose for the work Zaraza, Biografía de un Pueblo.
- 1962: National Prize for Literature for the work Tucupido, Formación de un Pueblo del Llano.
- 1969: Andrés Bellos Medal.
- 1970: 27 June order (Golden Medal).
- 1973: Alphonse the Wise Medal.
- 1973: Liberator's Medal.
- 1976: Andrés Bello Medal.

== Some works ==
Books of History

- 1949: Zaraza, Biografía de un Pueblo (Zaraza, Biography of a Town).
- 1951: Origen y Formación de algunos Pueblos de Venezuela (Origin and Development of some Towns of Venezuela).
- 1956: Historia de la Tierra de Monagas (History of the Land of Monagas).
- 1957: Documentos para la Historia colonial de los Andes Venezolanos (Documents for the colonial History of the Venezuelan Andes).
- 1961: Tucupido, Formación de un Pueblo del Llano (Tucupido, Development of a Town of Venezuelan plains).
- 1961: Vocabulario del Hato (Vocabulary of the Farm).
- 1964: Guayana, su Tierra y su Historia (Guayana, its Land and History).
- 1966: Fermín Toro y su Época (Fermín Toro and his time).
- 1967: Caracas: Origen y Trayectoria de una Ciudad (Caracas: Origin and Path of a City).
- 1967: Influencia de algunas Capitulaciones en la Geografía de Venezuela (Influence of some Settlements in the Geography of Venezuela).
- 1969: Vida Política de Caracas en el Siglo XIX (Political Life of Caracas in the Nineteenth Century).
- 1971: La Batalla de Carabobo. Antecedentes y Effectos (The Battle of Carabobo. Precedents and Consequences).
- 1971: Juan Francisco de León. Diario de una Insurgencia (Juan Francisco de León. Diary of a Rebellion).
- 1974: Historia de Puerto Cabello (History of Puerto Cabello).
- 1975: Historia de la Radiodifusión en Venezuela (History of Broadcasting in Venezuela).
- 1976: Boves a través de sus Biografías (Boves through his Biographies).
- 1978: Historia de Paraguaná y Punto Fijo (History of Paraguaná and Punto Fijo).
- 1978: Historia del Guárico (History of Guárico).
- 1978: El Mocho Hernández. Papeles de su Archivo (El Mocho Hernández. Papers from his Archive).
- 1979: Caracas habla en Documentos (Caracas speaks in Documents).
- 1980: San Miguel del Batey. Población del Siglo XVII (San Miguel of Batey. Town of 17th century).
- 1981: Semblanzas, Testimonios y Apólogos (Portraits, Testimonials and Fables).

Poems

- 1948: Candil, Romances de la Tierra.
- 1948: Tiempo del Aroma.
- 1950: Retablo.
- 1952: Cardumen. Relatos de Tierra Caliente.
- 1954: Islas de Pueblos.
- 1967: Canto Solar a Venezuela.
- 1977: Territorio del Viento.

Speech

- Aventura y Circunstancia del Llanero. Ganadería y Límites del Guárico. (Siglo XVIII). (Adventures and Circumstances of el Llanero. Livestock Farming and Boundaries of Guárico, 18th century).

== Sources ==
The following book contains a short biography of de Armas Chitty:

- Armas Chitty, J.A. (1982): Historia de la Tierra de Monagas. Impresos Urbina C.A., Caracas. (Biblioteca de Temas y Autores Monaguenses; Colección Guácharo; Reediciones y Biografías).
