= Eugenio Montejo =

Venezuelan writer

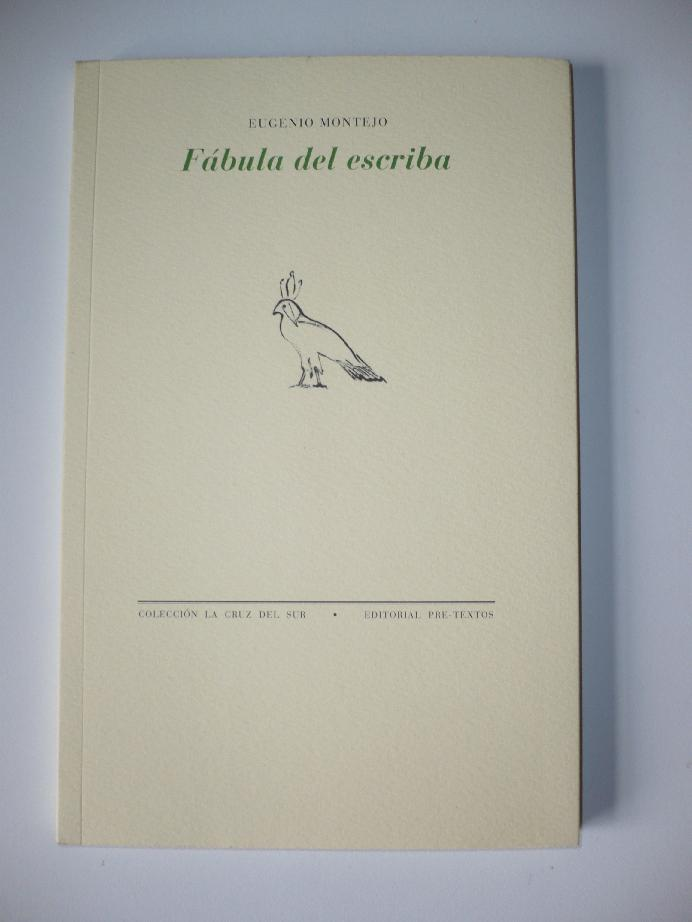
Montejo's last poem book, Fábula del Escriba

Eugenio Montejo (1938 in Caracas – 5 June 2008 in Valencia) was a Venezuelan poet and essay writer, founder of the literary magazine Azar and co-founder of Revista Poesía, a poetry magazine published by the University of Carabobo.

== Career and Recognition ==
He was a researcher at the "Rómulo Gallegos" Centre for Latin American Studies in Caracas and contributed to a large number of national and international magazines. In Venezuela he was awarded the National Prize for Literature in 1998 and in 2004 he received the International Octavio Paz Prize for Poetry and Essay.

International interest in Montejo's poetry grew after his poem "La Tierra Giró para Acercarnos" ("The Earth Turned to Bring Us Closer") was used in the film 21 Grams by feted Mexican director Alejandro González Iñárritu. A few lines from the poem are quoted by Sean Penn's character in the movie.

== Poetic work ==
- Elegos (1967)
- Muerte y memoria (1972)
- Algunas palabras (1977)
- Terredad (1978)
- Trópico absoluto (1982)
- Alfabeto del mundo (1986)
- Adiós al Siglo XX (1992, 1997 a complete version)
- Papiros amorosos (2002)
- Chamario (2003, for children)
- Fábula del escriba (2006)

== Essays ==
- La ventana oblicua (1974)
- El taller blanco (1983)
- El cuaderno de Blas Coll (1981)

== Translations ==
- The Trees (selected poems 1967–2004) - an anthology of selected poems with English translations by the Australian poet Peter Boyle. Original Spanish text appears alongside English translation (Salt Publishing, 2004).
- Alphabet of the World (Selected Works by Eugenio Montejo). An anthology of selected poems and prose pieces, translated and edited by Kirk Nesset. A bilingual book; the text in Spanish appears also. Critical introduction by Wilfredo Hernandez and Kirk Nesset (University of Oklahoma Press, 2010).
