= Elisa Lerner =

Venezuelan playwright and essayist (1932–2024)

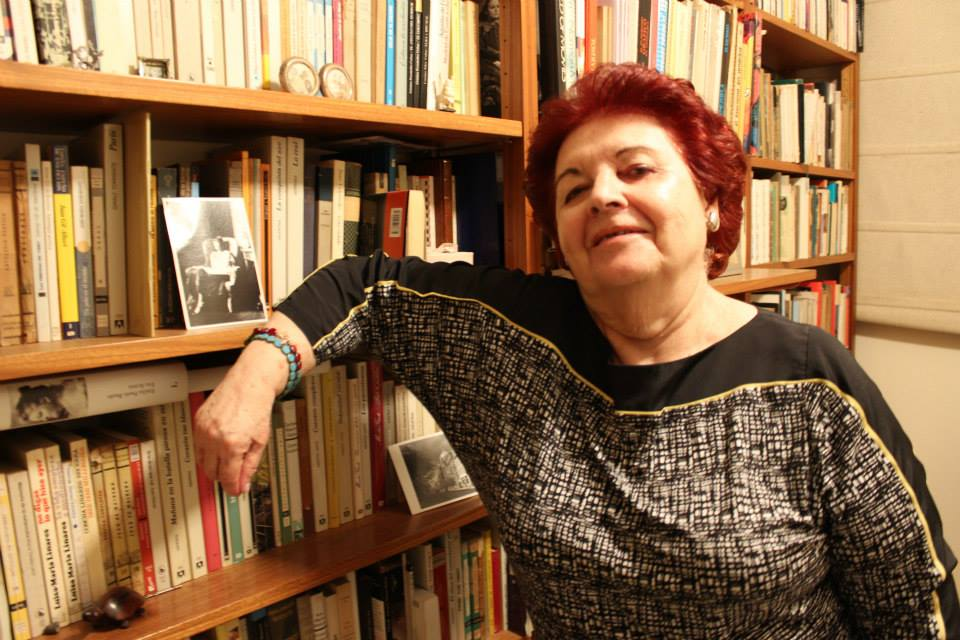
- Lerner in 2013
- Born: 6 June 1932; Valencia, Venezuela
- Died: 24 November 2024 (aged 92)
- Occupations: Playwright, essayist
- Writing career
- Notable work: Yo amo a Columbo (1979)

Elisa Lerner Nagler (6 June 1932 – 24 November 2024) was a Venezuelan playwright and essayist. Among her works are the plays: Vida con mamá and En el vasto silencio de Manhattan; the essays volume Yo amo a Columbo o la pasión dispersa and the chronicle books: Carriel para la fiesta and Crónicas ginecológicas. In 1999, she was awarded the National Prize for Literature.

Lerner died on 24 November 2024, at the age of 92.

== Works ==
- En el vasto silencio de Manhattan (1961, play)
- Una sonrisa detrás de la metáfora (1969, essay)
- Vida con mamá (1976, play)
- Yo amo a Columbo (1979, essays)
- Carriel número cinco (1983, chronicles).
- Crónicas ginecológicas (1984, chronicles).
- Carriel para la fiesta (1997, chronicles)
- En el entretanto (2000, short s
- Homenaje a la estrella (2002, short stories)
- De muerte lenta (2006, novel)
- Así que pasen cien años (2016, collected chronicles)

== Sources ==
- Socorro, Milagros (6 April 2000). «Elisa Lerner, una atleta de la soledad» (spanish). Análitica Venezuela Magazine
- Biography of Elisa Lerner for her novel De muerte Lenta (Fundación Bigott/Equinoccio, 2006)
