= Ludovico Silva =

Venezuelan philosopher

Luis José Silva Michelena, best known as Ludovico Silva (1937–1988) was a Venezuelan poet and philosopher. A Marxist philosopher, he developed an account of ideology as symbolic surplus.

== Life ==
Luis José Silva Michelena was born in Caracas on February 16, 1937, the son of Hector Silva Urbano and Josefina Michelena. He was educated at a private school, the Colegio San Ignacio, Caracas, before travelling to study philosophy, literature and philology in Spain, France and Germany. From 1970 to 1986 he was a professor of philosophy at the Central University of Venezuela. From 1964 to 1968 he was head of the Caracas Athenaeum. With Miguel Otero Silva he founded the literary magazine Lamigal.

== Illness and death ==
Heavy drinking caused his brain to be affected by excess ammonium, and in 1986 he was committed to a mental institution for 33 days. He died in Caracas on December 8, 1988.

== Works ==
- Tenebra, 1964
- La Plusvalía Ideológica [Ideological surplus], 1970
- El estilo literario de Marx [Marx's literary style], 1970
- Teoría y práctica de la ideología [Theory and practice of ideology], 1971
- Anti-manual para uso de marxistas, marxólogos y marxianos [Anti-manual for the use of Marxists, Marxologists and Marxians], 1975
- El estilo literario de Marx [Marx's literary style], 1975
  - Marx’s Literary Style, Verso 2023, ISBN 9781839765537.
- Ensayos temporales: Poesía y teoría social [Temporary essays: poetry and social theory], 1983
- La alienación como sistema: la teoría de la alienación en la obra de Marx [Alienation as a system: the theory of alienation in Marx's work], 1983
- La interpretación femenina de la historia y otros ensayos [The female interpretation of history and other essays], 1987
- Opera poética, 1958-1982 [Poetical works, 1958-1982], 1988
- La torre de los ángeles [The tower of the angels], 1991
