= Salvador Garmendia =

Venezuelan writer

- Born: Salvador Garmendia Graterón; 11 June 1928; Barquisimeto, Lara state, Venezuela
- Died: 13 May 2001 (aged 72); Caracas
- Occupations: novelist, writer
- Writing career
- Notable work: Los Pequeños Seres

Signature
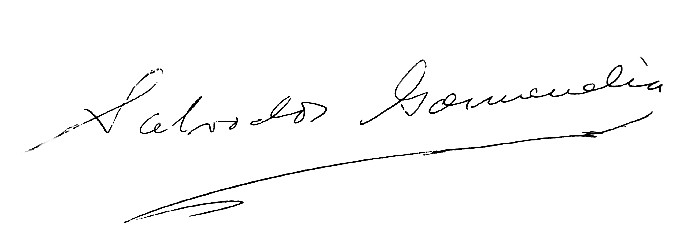

Salvador Garmendia Graterón (11 June 1928, Barquisimeto – 13 May 2001, Caracas) was a notable Venezuelan author, awarded in 1972 with the National Prize for Literature. In 1989, he received the Juan Rulfo Prize for Tan desnuda como una piedra.

== List of works ==
=== Novels ===
- Los pequeños seres (1958)
- Los habitantes (1961)
- Día de ceniza (1963)
- La mala vida (1968)
- Los pies de barro (1972)
- Memorias de Altagracia (1974); translated to English by Jeremy Munday in 1996
- El capitán Kid (1988)

=== Novellas ===
- El parque (1946)

=== Short story collections ===
- Cuentos cómicos (1991)
- Doble fondo (1966)
- Difuntos, extraños y volátiles (1970)
- Los escondites (1972)
- El inquieto Anacobero y otros cuentos (1976)
- El brujo hípico y otros relatos (1979)
- Emmiendas y atropellos (1979)
- El único lugar possible (1981)
- Hace mal tiempo afuera (1986)
- La casa del tiempo (1986)
- La gata y la señora (1991)
- La media espada de Amadís (1998)
- No es el espejo (2002)
- El regreso (2004)
- El inquieto Anacobero y otros relatos (2004)
- Entre tías y putas (2008)

=== Non-fiction ===
- La novela en Venezuela (1966)
- Crónicas Sádicas (1991)
- La vida buena (1995)
- Anotaciones en cuaderno negro (2003)
- El gran miedo, Vida(s) y escritura(s) (2004)

=== Books for children ===
- Galileo en su reino (1994)
- El cuento más viejo del mundo (1997)
- Un pingüino en Maracaibo (1998)
- El sapo y los cocuyos (1998)
- El turpial que vivió dos veces (2000)
- Mi familia de trapo (2002)
- La viuda que se quedó tiesa (2004)

== See also ==
- Venezuela
- Venezuelan literature
