= Rafael Cadenas =

Venezuelan poet and essayist

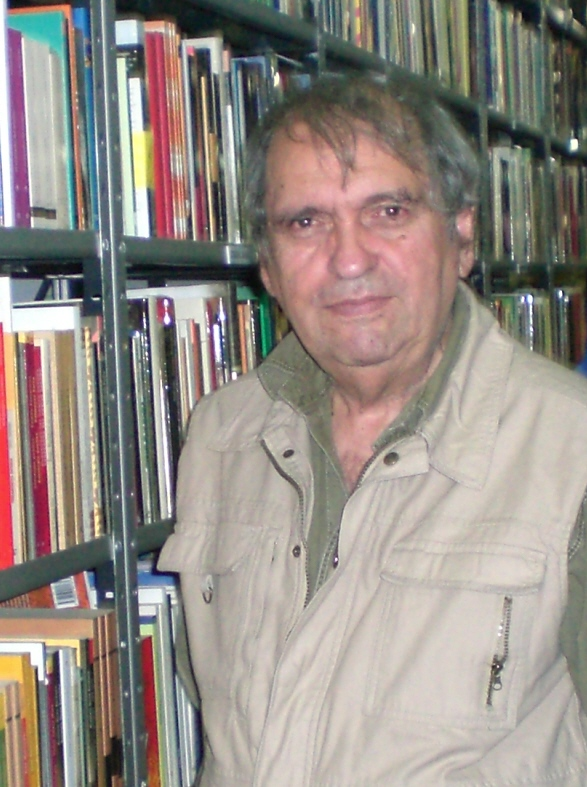
- Born: 8 April 1930 (age 96); Barquisimeto, Lara, Venezuela

Signature
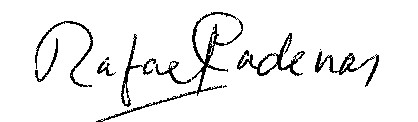

Rafael Cadenas (born 8 April 1930 Barquisimeto, Lara, Venezuela) is a Venezuelan poet and essayist.

== Career ==
He taught for many years at the Central University of Venezuela. He received the National Prize for Literature (1985), Guadalajara's International Book Fair prize of literature (Romance languages) (México, 2009) and García Lorca Prize (2015). Cadenas was awarded the Miguel de Cervantes Prize in 2022, the first Venezuelan to receive the award. On April 24, 2023, he received the 2022 Cervantes Prize, the highest recognition for contributions to literature in the Spanish language.

== Awards ==
- Conac's essay prize (1984).
- National Prize for Literature (Poetry)(Venezuela, 1985).
- Juan Antonio Pérez Bonalde's International Prize of Poetry (1992).
- Guggenheim Fellowship (1986).
- Honorary degree from the University of the Andes, Venezuela (2001).
- Honorary degree from the Central University of Venezuela (2005).
- Guadalajara's International Book Fair prize of literature (Romance languages) (México, 2009)
- García Lorca Prize (2015)
- Reina Sofia (2018)
- Miguel de Cervantes Prize (2022)

== Works ==
=== Poetry ===
- Cantos iniciales (1946)
- Una isla (1958)
- Los cuadernos del destierro (1960, 2001)
- "Derrota" (1963)
- Falsas maniobras (1966)
- Tiempo Del Machete (1969)
- Intemperie (1977)
- Memorial (1977) Bilingual Edition (Spanish to English)
- Amante (1983)
- Dichos (1992)
- Gestiones (1992)
- Antología (1958–1993) (1996), (1999)
- Amante (bid & co. editor, 2002)
- Poemas selectos (bid & co. editor, 2004, 2006, 2009)
- Amant (bid & co. editor, 2004) [trad. al francés de "Amante")
- Lover (bid & co. editor, 2004, 2009)
- El taller de al lado (bid & co. editor, 2005)
- Sobre abierto (2012)

=== Essays ===
- Literatura y vida (1972)
- Realidad y literatura (1979)
- Apuntes sobre San Juan de la Cruz y la mística (1977, 1995)
- La barbarie civilizada (1981)
- Anotaciones (1983)
- Reflexiones sobre la ciudad moderna (1983)
- En torno al lenguaje (1984)
- Sobre la enseñanza de la literatura en la Educación Media (1998)
