= José Luis Salcedo Bastardo =

Venezuelan historian and diplomat

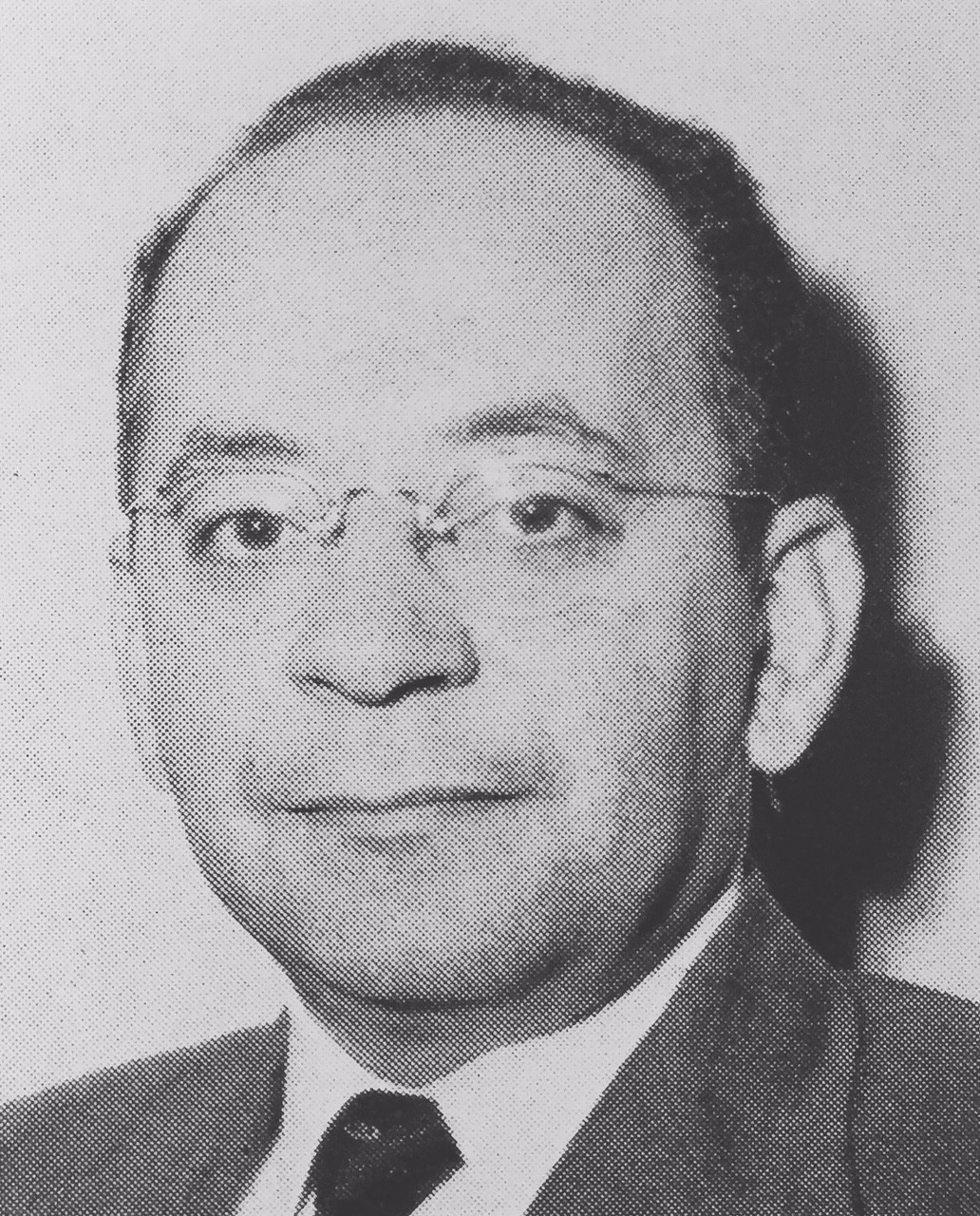
José Luis Salcedo Bastardo

José Luis Salcedo Bastardo (15 March 1926 – 16 February 2005) was a Venezuelan historian and diplomat. He was born in Carúpano, and died in Caracas.
