= Julio Garmendia =

Venezuelan writer, journalist, and diplomat

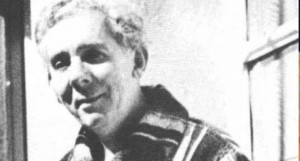
- Born: January 9, 1898; El Tocuyo, Lara state, Venezuela
- Died: July 8, 1977 (age 78); Caracas, Venezuela
- Writing career
- Notable work: La Tienda de Muñecos

Julio Garmendia (1898–1977) was a Venezuelan writer, journalist and diplomat.

== Biography ==
He was born in the plantation "El Molino", at El Tocuyo, Lara state, on January 9, 1898. He was the son of Dr. Rafael Garmendia Rodríguez and Doña Celsa Murrieta. Because of the early death of his mother, he spent his earliest years with his grandmother in Barquisimeto. After studying in high school, he moves to Caracas with his father in 1915. When he was 17 years old, he started an intense work as a journalist on El Universal newspaper and on different magazines from the time; while he actively participated in the intellectual circles of the city. He was one of the founder students of the La Salle school. In 1909 he published a little essay in the "El Eco Industrial" journal. In 1914 he began studies at Instituto de Comercio de Caracas; he quit a little later to work as a redactor in El Universal. He met people from the so-called Generation of 1928. As a diplomat, he first worked at the Venezuelan Legation in Paris; after that, he became Consul in Genoa, Copenhagen and Norway from 1923 to 1940.

While he was in Paris, he published his first book, La Tienda de Muñecos in 1927. Most critics accept this work as the first fantastic genre work in Venezuela.

After having traveled through the Nordic countries, he started working on his second book, La Tuna de Oro, which he finished in 1961. In this book, the narrative voice is a lot darker, helping the environment of posterity that he sees in his travels through Europe. Julio Garmendia died in Caracas on July 8, 1977.

== List of works ==
- La Tienda de Muñecos (1927)
- La Tuna de Oro (1951)
- La Hoja que no Había Caído en su Otoño (1979)
- Opiniones para Después de la Muerte (1984)
