= List of Venezuelan writers =

This is a list in alphabetical order of Venezuelan literary figures and their most representative works, including poets, novelists, historians, essayists, and scholars.

== A-B ==
- Raquel Abend (born 1989), novelist, poet, author of "Andor" (2017), "Sobre las fábricas" (2020), and "Cuarto Azul" (2022).
- Alfredo Armas Alfonzo (1921–1990) historian, author of "El osario de Dios" (1967).
- José Antonio de Armas Chitty (1908–1995) historian, author of "Zaraza, Biografía de un Pueblo", "Caracas habla en Documentos".
- Rafael Arráiz Lucca (born 1959) historian, essayist, poet and journalist, author of "Venezuela en cuatro asaltos" (1993), "El recuerdo de Venecia y otros ensayos" (1999) and "Venezuela: 1830 a nuestros días" (2007).
- Enriqueta Arvelo Larriva (1886–1962) poet, author of "Voz asilada" (1939).
- Alberto Arvelo Torrealba (1905–1971) poet, author of "Cantas" (1938) and "Glosas del cancionero" (1950).
- Rafael María Baralt (1810–1860) diplomat, writer and historian, author of "Resumen de la Historia de Venezuela" (1840) and "Adiós a la Patria" (1842).
- Alberto Barrera Tyszka (born 1960) novelist, poet, screenwriter, author of the novel "La enfermedad" (2006), awarded with the Herralde Prize, and "Patria or Muerte" (2015).
- Luis Barrera Linares (born 1951), novelist, storyteller, author of the novel "Parto de caballeros" (1991, 2012) and "Sin partida de yacimiento" (2009, 2017).
- Natividad Barroso (born 1937) writer and ethnologist
- Andrés Bello (1781–1865) humanist, poet, philosopher and educator, author of "Calendario manual y guía de forasteros" (1810), "Alocución a la poesía" (1823) and "Silva a la agricultura de la zona tórrida" (1826).
- Alegría Bendayán de Bendelac – writer and Jewish poet
- Rómulo Betancourt (1908–1981) politician, journalist and essayist, author of "Venezuela: política y petróleo" (1956).
- Andrés Eloy Blanco (1897–1955) politician and poet, author of "Liberación y siembra" (1938) "Giraluna" (1955) and "La Juanbimbada" (1959).
- Eduardo Blanco (1840–1903) novelist and historian, author of "Venezuela Heróica" and "Zárate" (1882).
- Rufino Blanco Fombona (1874–1944) historian, author of "El hombre de hierro" (1907), "El hombre de oro" (1915) and "Mocedades de Bolívar" (1939).
- Mario Briceño Iragorry (1897–1958) essayist and historian, author of "El caballero de Ledesma" (1951), "Mensaje sin Destino" (1952).
- Carlos Brandt (1875–1964)
- Federico Brito Figueroa (1921–2000) historian, author of "La estructura económica de Venezuela colonial" (1978) and "Tiempo de Ezequiel Zamora" (1981).
- Luis Britto García (born 1941) essayist, author of "Rajatabla" (1970) and "Abrapalabra" (1980).

== C-F ==
- Manuel Caballero (1931–2010), essayist and historian, author of "EL orgullo de leer" (1988), "Gómez, El tirano liberal" (1993) and "Rómulo Betancourt, político de nación" (2004).
- José Ignacio Cabrujas (1937–1995), writer, playwright, author of "Acto cultural; El dia que me quieras; La soberbia milagrosa del General Pio Fernández" – Colección Primer acto (1979), "El país según Cabrujas" (1992).
- Rafael Cadenas (born 1930), poet, author of "Los cuadernos del destierro" (1960) and "Intemperie" (1977).
- María Calcaño (1906–1956), poet, author of "Alas fatales" (1935), "Canciones que oyeron mis últimas muñecas" (1956).
- Rafael Caldera (1916–2009), politician, lawyer and essayist, author of "Andrés Bello" (1935), "Derecho del Trabajo" (1939), "Reflexiones de la Rábida" (1976), "Bolívar Siempre" (1987) and "Los causahabientes, de Carabobo a Puntofijo" (1999).
- Juan Calzadilla (1931–2025), poet and art critic, author of "Malos modales" (1968) and "Diario sin sujeto" (1999).
- Germán Carrera Damas (born 1930), historian, author of "El Culto a Bolívar" (1969), "Una nación llamada Venezuela" (1980).
- Juan Carlos Chirinos (born 1967), novelist, short story writer and biographer, author of "Gemelas" (2012), "Nochebosque" (2011), "Los sordos trilingües" (2011), "Miranda, el nómada sentimental" (2006), "La reina de los cuatro nombres" (2005), "El niño malo cuenta hasta cien y se retira" (2004), "Alejandro Magno, el vivo anhelo de conocer" (2004), "Albert Einstein, cartas probables para Hann" (2004), "Homero haciendo zapping" (2003) and "Leerse los gatos" (1997).
- Simón Alberto Consalvi (1927–2013), essayist and historian, author of "Auge y caída de Rómulo Gallegos".
- Victoria de Stefano (1940–2023), writer and philosopher, author of "Paleografías" (2010), "Historias de la marcha a pie" (Reed. 2013).
- Manuel Díaz Rodríguez (1871–1927), diplomat, novelist, author of "Idolos rotos" (1901), "Sangre patricia" (1902) and "Peregrina" (1926).
- Alicia Freilich (born 1939), writer, novelist, journalist and educator; author of "Cuarta Dimensión" (1975), "La Venedemocracia" (1978), "Kápler" (1987), "Colombina Descubierta" (1991).

== G-I ==
- Rómulo Gallegos (1884–1969), novelist and politician, author of "La Trepadora" (1925), "Doña Bárbara" (1929), "Cantaclaro" (1934), "Canaima" (1935), "Pobre Negro" (1937).
- Luis García Morales (1929–2015), poet and cultural promoter, author of "El río siempre" (1984).
- Julio Garmendia (1898–1977), short story writer, author of "La tienda de muñecos" (1927) and "La Tuna de Oro" (1951).
- Salvador Garmendia (1928–2001), novelist, author of "Los Pequeños Seres" (1959), "Los Habitantes" (1961), "Día de Ceniza" (1968), "Memorias de Altagracia" (1974).
- Vicente Gerbasi (1913–1992), poet, author of "Mi padre el inmigrante" (1945), "Los espacios cálidos" (1952) and "Los colores ocultos" (1985).
- José Gil Fortoul (1861–1943), historian and journalist, author of "El humo de mi pipa" (1891) and "Historia Constitucional de Venezuela" (1909).
- Francisco González Guinán (1841–1932), journalist and historian, author of "El consejero de la juventud" (1877), "Historia Contemporánea de Venezuela" (published between 1891 and 1915) and "Tradiciones de mi pueblo" (1927).
- Adriano González León (1931–2008), novelist and poet, author of "Las Hogueras más Altas" (1957), "Asfalto Infierno" (1963), "El hombre que daba sed" (1967), and "País portátil" (1968).
- Pedro Grases (1909–2004), Spanish born essayist, compilator, author of "Anuario Bibliográfico Venezolano" (1942–1948).
- Francisco Herrera Luque (1927–1991), historian and novelist, author of "Boves el urogallo" (1972), "Los amos del valle" (1979), "La historia fabulada" (1981–1983) and "Los cuatro reyes de la baraja" (1991).
- Boris Izaguirre (born 1965), novelist and essayist, author of "Fetiche" (2003) and "Villa diamante" (2007).

== J-N ==
- Santiago Key Ayala (1874–1959), historian, writer and diplomat, and is considered one of the most important Venezuelan intellectuals from the first half of the 20th century
- Elisa Lerner (1932–2024), playwright and essayist, author of "En el vasto silencio de Manhattan" (1961), "Yo amo a Columbo o la pasión dispersa" (2002).
- Eduardo Liendo (1941–2025), novelist, author of "Los Platos del Diablo" (1985) and "El Mago de la Cara de Vidrio" (1973).
- Juan Liscano (1914–2001), poet, author of "Nombrar contra el tiempo" (anthology of his first six books of poetry), "Espiritualidad y literatura", and "Los mitos de la sexualidad".
- Luz Machado (1916–1999), poet, author of "La espiga amarga" (1950), "Retratos y tormentos" (1973).
- Samuel Darío Maldonado (1870–1925), poet, writer, author of "Tierra Nuestra" (1920).
- Cristina Marcano (born 1960), journalist, author of "Hugo Chávez Sin Uniforme: Una Historia Personal" (2005).
- Ibsen Martínez (1951–2024), narrator, playwright, author of "Humboldt & Bonpland, taxidermistas; L.S.D. – Lucio in the sky with diamonds" (1991), "El mono aullador de los manglares" (2000), "El señor Marx no está en casa" (2009).
- Francisco Massiani (1944–2019), novelist, author of "Piedra de Mar" (1968).
- Milagros Mata Gil (1951–2023), novelist, essayist, author of "La casa en llamas" (1986), "Memorias de una antigua primavera" (1989).
- José Ramón Medina (1919–2010), poet and essayist, founder and director of Biblioteca Ayacucho, author of "Ser verdadero" (anthology), "La edad de la esperanza" (1947), "Sobre la tierra yerma" (1971), "Certezas y Presagios" (1984), and "50 años de literatura venezolana" (1969).
- Juan Carlos Méndez Guédez (born 1967), novelist, author of "El libro de Esther" (1999).
- Guillermo Meneses (1911–1978), historian and novelist, author of "El Falso Cuaderno de Narciso Espejo" (1952), "Cinco Novelas" (1972), and "Espejos y Disfraces" (1981).
- Augusto Mijares (1897–1979), historian, school teacher, author of "Lo afirmativo venezolano" (1963) and "El Libertador" (1965).
- Eugenio Montejo (1938–2008), poet, author of "Algunas Palabras" (1976), "Terredad" (1978), "Trópico Absoluto" (1982), "Alfabeto del Mundo" (1987), and "Entre el Silencio y la Palabra".
- Guillermo Morón (1926–2021), historian and novelist, author of "Microhistorias" (1980), "El gallo de las espuelas de oro" (1984), "Los presidentes de Venezuela" (1993).
- Stefania Mosca (1957-2009), novelist and essayist, author of "Seres cotidianos" (1990), "La última cena" (1991), "Banales" (1993).
- Aquiles Nazoa (1920–1976), poet, author of "Los humoristas de Caracas" (1966), "Caracas física y espiritual" (1967) and "Humor y Amor" (1970).

== O-Q ==
- Hanni Ossott (1946–2002), poet, author of "Espacios de Ausencia y de Luz" (1982), "El Reino donde la Noche se Abre" (1986), "Cielo tu Arco Grande" (1989).
- Edgar C. Otálvora (born 1959), historian, journalist and politician, author of "La Crisis de la Corbeta Caldas".
- Miguel Otero Silva (1908–1985), journalist and novelist, author of "Fiebre" (1931), "Casas Muertas" (1955), "Cuando quiero llorar no lloro" (1970).
- Julián Padrón (1910–1954), novelist, author of "La Guaricha" (1934).
- Antonia Palacios (1904-2001), poet, novelist and essayist, author of "Ana Isabel : una niña decente" (1969), "Los Insulares" (1972).
- Ramón Palomares (1935–2016), poet, author of "El reino" (1958), "Adiós Escuque" (1974).
- Isaac J Pardo (1905–2000), historian, essayist, author of "Esta tierra de gracia" (1955), "Fuegos bajo el agua" (1983)
- Teresa de la Parra (1889–1936), novelist, author of "Ifigenia" (1924) and "Las memorias de Mamá Blanca" (1929).
- Fernando Paz Castillo (1893–1981), poet, author of "La voz de los cuatros vientos" (1931), "Signo" (1937), "Reflexiones de atardecer" (1964), "Entre pintores y escritores" (1970).
- Ramón Paz Ipuana (1937-1992), poet and writer of shorts stories in both Spanish and Wayuu language, author of Mitos, leyendas y cuentos guajiros (1973), El Conejo y el Mapurite (1979).
- Juan Antonio Pérez Bonalde (1846–1892), poet, author of "Vuelta a la Patria" (1877)
- Manuel Pérez Vila (1922–1991), Spanish born historian, author of "Las campañas periodísticas del Libertador" (1968).
- Teodoro Petkoff (1932–2018), politician, journalist and essayist, author of "Checoslovaquia: El Socialismo como problema" (1969), "Proceso a la izquierda" (1976), "Las Dos Izquierdas" (2005).
- Mariano Picón Salas (1901–1965), essayist, novelist and historian, author of "Viaje al amanecer" (1943), "Comprensión de Venezuela" (1949), "Los días de Cipriano Castro" (1953).
- Cruz Salmerón Acosta (1892–1929), poet, author of "Fuente de Amargura" (1952).
- Elías Pino Iturrieta (born 1944), historian, author of "Contra lujuria y castidad" (1992), "Venezuela metida en cintura" (1998), "El Divino Bolívar" (2003).
- José Rafael Pocaterra (1889–1955), historian and short story writer, author of "Cuentos Grotescos" (1922), "Memorias de un venezolano de la decadencia" (1936).
- José Antonio Ramos Sucre (1890–1930), poet, author of "La Torre de Timón" (1925), "El cielo de esmalte" (1929) and "Las formas del fuego" (1929).
- Lucia Raynero (born 1955), historian, author of "La noción de libertad en los politicos venezolanos del siglo XIX" (2001), "Clio frente al espejo" (2007).
- Simón Rodríguez (1769–1854), philosopher and educator, author of "Sociedades Americanas" (1828).
- Manuel Vicente Romerogarcía (1861–1917), novelist and journalist, author of "Peonía" (1890).
- Rafael Ángel Rondón Márquez (1898–1966), historian, author of "Guzmán Blanco, el autócrata civilizador" (1944).
- Jesús Rosas Marcano (1930–2001), poet, journalist and educator, author of "Proclama de la espiga" (1958), "Cotiledón, Cotiledón, la vida" (1965), "Manso vidrio del aire" (1968), "Así en la tierra como en el cielo" (1976).
- Juan Germán Roscio (1762–1821), politician, lawyer and writer, author of "El triunfo de la libertad sobre el despotismo" (1817).

== S-Z ==
- Karina Sainz Borgo (born 1982), journalist and writer
- José Luis Salcedo Bastardo (1926–2005), historian, author of "Historia Fundamental de Venezuela" (1977).
- Oscar Sambrano Urdaneta (1929–2011), essayist and compiler, author of "Aproximaciones a Bello", "Poesía contemporánea de Venezuela", "Literatura hispanoamericana".
- Juan Sánchez Peláez (1922–2003), poet, author of "Poesía 1951–1981".
- Nery Santos Gómez (born 1967), short story writer, author of "Hilandera de tramas" (2012), "Lazareto de afecciones" (2018), "Al borde de la decencia" (2019).
- Jesús Sanoja Hernández (1930–2007), journalist and historian, author of "Entre golpes y revoluciones" (2007).
- Tomás Straka (born 1972), historian, author of "La Voz de los Vencidos" (2006), "Las Alas de Ícaro", "Un Reino para este mundo" (2006), "Contra Bolívar" (2009), "La épica del desencanto" (2009).
- Ana Enriqueta Terán (1918–2017), poet, author of "Casa de hablas" (1991).
- Ana Teresa Torres (born 1945), novelist, essayist and short story writer, author of "Doña Inés contra el olvido" (1992), "Nocturama" (2006) and "La escribana del viento" (2013).
- Fermín Toro (1807–1865), politician, diplomat, essayist and novelist, author of "Los Mártires" (1842).
- Alfredo Toro Hardy (born 1950), diplomat and writer, author of "¿Para qué una Política Exterior?" (1984), "El Desafío Venezolano" (1987), "La Maldición de Sísifo" (1989), "La Era de las Aldeas" (2002), "¿Tiene Futuro América Latina?" (2004), "Hegemonía e Imperio" (2007), "The World Turned Upside Down", (2013), “Understanding Latin America” (2017), “The Crossroads of Globalization” (2017), “China versus US: Who Will Prevail?” (2020).
- Arturo Uslar Pietri (1906–2001), novelist, essayist, journalist and historian, author of "Las lanzas coloradas" (1931), "El camino de El Dorado" (1947), "Oficio de difuntos" (1976), "La isla de Robinson" (1981), "La visita en el tiempo" (1990).
- Laureano Vallenilla Lanz (1870–1936), historian, journalist and philosopher, author of "El gendarme necesario" (1911) and "Cesarismo democrático" (1919).
- Oscar Yanes (1927–2013), journalist, author of "Cosas del mundo" (1972), "Memorias de Armandito" (1992) and "Pura Pantalla" (2000).
- Humberto Tejera (1890–1971), poet, writer, essayist, author of "Cinco Águilas Blancas" (1932), "Una Voz" (1939), "Crónica de la escuela rural mexicana" (1963).
- Slavko Župčić (born 1956), writer, has published several novels and short story collections. He has also written books for children. His work has appeared in English translation

== See also ==
- List of Latin American writers
- List of Venezuelans
- Venezuelan literature
