= LGBTQ literature in Venezuela =

History of LGBTQ+ literature in Venezuela

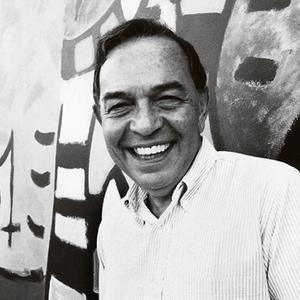
Isaac Chocrón, considered one of the greatest authors of Venezuelan LGBTQ literature.

LGBTQ literature in Venezuela comprises literary works written by Venezuelan authors that involve plots, themes, or characters that are part of or related to sexual diversity. Historically, Venezuelan literature has had among its central concerns the idea of nation building and violence, both themes approached from a traditionally masculine point of view, so sexuality, and in particular sexual diversity, have received little academic interest as literary subjects.

The first references to homosexuality or homoerotic interactions in Venezuelan literature occurred in the late 19th century, in works such as Débora (1884) by Tomás Michelena, or some novels by Manuel Vicente Romero García, although in these cases they were minor references in a mocking tone. In the first decades of the 20th century, Teresa de la Parra stands out; a lesbian writer who, although she never publicly acknowledged her homosexuality, wrote works in which contemporary scholars have identified feminine homoerotic elements, such as the novel Ifigenia (1924).

During the second half of the 20th century, the figure of Isaac Chocrón emerged, considered a pioneering writer in Venezuelan male homosexual literature, who produced an extensive corpus of works that explored LGBT themes, including the play La revolución (1971). Another work by Chocrón was the novel Pájaro de mar por tierra (1972), which follows the story of a young bisexual man named Miguel who emigrates to New York in the midst of the process of forging his identity, but who after exploring his sexuality ends up returning disappointed to Venezuela.

In both of Chocrón's works from this period as well as in works published by other authors, it was common for LGBT characters to meet tragic ends. Homosexuality was also frequently explored in a negative light, for example in short stories by authors such as Ednodio Quintero, Luis Barrera Linares and Alberto Jiménez Ure. Other Venezuelan authors who emerged during the second half of the 20th century and who wrote from a perspective of sexual diversity include figures such as José Balza, Francisco Rivera, Marco Antonio Ettedgui and Boris Izaguirre.

Unlike male LGBT literature and the production existing in other countries in the region, lesbianism was little explored and studied topic in Venezuelan literature of the 20th century. Except for the homoerotic suggestions in some of Teresa de la Parra's works from the first half of the 20th century, it would take decades before local writers such as Dinapiera Di Donato and Ana Teresa Torres returned to addressing female homosexuality. In 1991, Di Donato published the collection of short stories Noche con nieve y amante, considered the first openly lesbian work written by a Venezuelan woman. Torres, for her part, published La favorita del señor in 2001, a novel in narrative erotica.

Although the arrival of the 21st century brought with it the publication of works with more complex LGBT characters portrayed in less prejudiced societies, negative depictions of homosexuality continued to be common, particularly in short stories. Other authors, such as Gisela Kozak, began to subvert heteronormative conceptions of society much more directly in works such as All the Moons (2011), a novel that depicts a utopian society in which characters can explore their sexuality without fear of prejudice. Other contemporary authors who have repeatedly addressed sexual diversity include Manuel Gerardo Sánchez.

== First works ==
The first representations of homosexuality or homoeroticism in Venezuelan literature have their origin in the literature of the late 19th century. An early example is Débora (1884), a moralistic novel by Tomás Michelena that deals with adultery and contains homoerotic scenes between the male characters who seek the attention of the protagonist. Explicitly homosexual characters, on the other hand, appear portrayed in some of Romero's contemporary works. Marcelo, a novel written by Romero in 1890, presents a homosexual waiter who serves the protagonist with effeminate gestures, in a scene that gives the character a ridiculous character and where he is described as a "servant with a feminine voice and voluptuous dance". Another novel by Romero that includes a homosexual character is Peonía (1890).

The approach to sexual diversity with the intention of generating mockery is also present in "La barba no más" (1922), a play by Leopoldo Ayala Michelena. In the play, Ayala includes a homosexual hairdresser named Serapio with exaggerated feminine characteristics who seeks to create a new hairstyle and who only serves women. The protagonist, a heterosexual hairdresser named Caralampio, expresses his hatred of this affectation in the play, thus exemplifying the view of homosexuality at the time, which was viewed with rejection or as a reason for mockery.

In 1924, Teresa de la Parra published the novel Ifigenia, which academics have pointed out for its possible homoerotic content. De la Parra's own sexuality began to be re-evaluated decades after her death by figures such as Sylvia Molloy, particularly her relationship with Lydia Cabrera, who lived with her until her death and who was reportedly her romantic partner. Among the evidence of this are De la Parra's own original diaries, in which she said that she and Cabrera slept in the same bed.

In "Ifigenia," researchers such as Dolores Alcaide Ramírez have pointed out elements of the friendship between María Eugenia, the novel's protagonist, and Cristina and Mercedes that can be interpreted as clues to a platonic romantic love. In the case of Cristina, whom the protagonist meets during adolescence, the author's descriptions are constantly filled with detailed descriptions of her physical appearance and intellect, which captivate María Eugenia and make her a fervent admirer of her friend. This possible reading is supported by María Eugenia's reaction to the letter in which Cristina announces her marriage, which the protagonist takes as a betrayal and the end of the intimacy between them.

In the case of Mercedes, the admiration she arouses in María Eugenia is much more marked and explicit, with descriptions that focus on the effect that her perfume, her voice and her physique have on him, which the protagonist describes as "gentle and radiant, like that of a queen." The intensity of this reaction can be perceived in the following fragment:

When, upon finally emerging from the shadows, I went to greet her, I had mentally prepared a very expressive phrase, in which I intended to demonstrate my exalted admiration. But no sooner had she looked at me with her shining, curious eyes, so finely critical, and no sooner had I inhaled the subtle perfume that her person exhaled like a flower, than I felt invaded by the absolute paralysis of shyness. Therefore, after having welcomed and embraced me with that naturalness and ease that are her principal attraction, I, in return, was only allowed to murmur a few brief and courteous phrases. (...) I, then, (...) immediately understood that even greater than her beauty was her charm, that is to say, that she took to the highest perfection the art of interpreting herself; Because while he spoke, his mouth, his hands, his eyes, his head, his voice, his smile, everything, was subtly and harmoniously completing, with a thousand delicious nuances, the meaning expressed by the words.

The writer from Maracaibo, Andrés Mariño Palacio, was one of the authors who included homosexual characters during the first half of the century, such as in the novel Los alegres desahuciados (1948).

== Second half of the 20th century ==
Male LGBT literature in Venezuela has as a turning point the emergence of the figure of Isaac Chocrón, considered one of the greatest national playwrights of his time, who from the second half of the 20th century produced an extensive corpus of pioneering works in his investigation of different aspects of homosexuality in the society of the time. The first of these to focus on homosexuality as a main theme was the play La revolución (1971), which tells in two acts the story of an overweight homosexual man named Gabriel who feels too old to continue working in cabarets as a drag queen. During the play, Gabriel announces the imminent start of his show, which is repeatedly delayed because he has become absorbed in reminiscing about scenes from his youth. Finally, Gabriel gets into an altercation with his assistant that ends in the former's death from a gunshot wound. In terms of its representation of homosexuality, La revolución has a position for marking a change in the characterization of homosexual characters: from being subjects in heterosexual environments used to generate ridicule in the reader, they became more complex characters, with an active sexuality and agency of their own.

The following year, Chocrón published the novel Pájaro de mar por tierra (1972), considered his emblematic work on LGBT themes. The plot of the novel follows the story of Miguel "Micky" Casas, a nineteen-year-old bisexual man who leaves his life in Caracas to forge a new identity in New York. In this city, Miguel experiences prostitution, a relationship with a man named Frank, and a general disenchantment that later lead him to return to his homeland, where he falls in love with an enigmatic woman named Gloria. Marked by his uprooting, Miguel constantly seeks emancipation in order to find himself. However, as in "La revolución," he ultimately meets a tragic end.

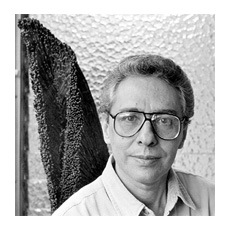
José Balza, author of Largo (1968).

The disenchantment in the lives of characters of diverse sexuality in different strata of Venezuelan society was one of the recurring themes in the writing of José Balza, who during the decades prior to the 21st century published several works on LGBT themes. In Largo (1968), Balza includes a homosexual sex scene where the character of Adriano, who could only conceive of his desire for men by imagining himself in the active role, ends up being penetrated by another man. In Midnight on Video: 1/5 (1988), on the other hand, he recounts an experience in a sex club where the union of bodies merges with various scenes that jump from one location to another.

As can be seen in Chocrón's works of these years and in some aspects of Balza's, homosexuality in the Venezuelan literature of the time was usually represented in tragic contexts. A heteronormative and negative vision of sexual diversity was also common, as can be seen in stories such as "Volveré con mis perros" (I Will Return with My Dogs) (1975) by Ednodio Quintero; "Nunca lloverá" (It Will Never Rain) (1985) by Luis Barrera Linares; and "Travestido" (1986) by Alberto Jiménez Ure. Quintero's story tells the story of an older man who meets a young man in a bar and, after the latter gets drunk, apparently sexually abuses him, which awakens the young man's hatred and thirst for revenge. However, the story also reveals a possible diverse sexual orientation in the young man, although this is supposedly explained by his mother's habit of dressing him in women's clothing as a child, which, in the narrator's words, would have "deformed" him. The author later expresses his hatred of this sexuality in the rape scene in the following terms:

Drunken with alcohol, you fell to the floor, long and beautiful as a palm tree, and I enjoyed you in every hole, and I rummaged inside you like a hungry dog in a garbage heap... I didn't know the hour you left, ashamed of your body, overcome with disgust and resentment. And I didn't hear the slam on the door or the threat from your lips like a curse: "I'll be back with my dogs, you old faggot."

Travestido (1986), by Alberto Jiménez Ure, takes a more disturbing tone in its negative exploration of homosexuality. In the story, Arturo confesses his desire to a homosexual boy named Luis by revealing that: "From my apartment, anguished, I always watch you... I masturbate and suffer." They both surrender to their passion, but Arturo is murdered during sexual intercourse. Later, Luis begins to develop a protuberance on his neck that they soon discover is a fetus, born deformed and rotten, as a symbol of the product of homosexual passion.

Other LGBT authors who emerged during the 1970s and 1980s include John Petrizzelli Font, who published his short story collection Negro lógico in 1978; Marco Antonio Ettedgui, who died in 1981 at the age of 22 but was influential in combining writing, theater, and conceptual art in his presentations; and Francisco Rivera, who published the novel Voces al atardecer in 1990, which explores the lives of a group of Venezuelan intellectuals of diverse sexual orientations through various literary genres. On the poetry side, Armando Rojas Guardia stood out.

The effects that the HIV/AIDS pandemic had on LGBT populations was another topic addressed in late-century literature. Isaac Chocrón was the first to portray the subject in his novel Toda una dama (1988), which in its final chapters includes the drama of those affected by the disease. A much broader exploration is found in Escrito y sello (1993), a play by Chocrón that deals with the reunion of two homosexual friends several years after they have separated. One of them is deeply affected by the death of a former partner named Luis, due to complications from AIDS. The play is notable for a shift in Chocrón's portrayal of LGBT characters, who from previously being marginalized and living in poverty are now professionals who have successfully integrated into society. Regarding the approach to HIV, the character of Miguel, who at the beginning of the work is depressed after learning that he has been infected, begins to learn to live with the virus and adopt a healthy lifestyle in order to control it as a chronic disease. A more mournful representation occurs in the testimonial novel Jeremías el replicante (1991), where José Vicente De Santis recounts his experience as a prostitute and model before learning that he was infected with HIV, and then the rejection he suffers when seeking help from a moralizing society that condemns him for his sexuality.

After the homoerotic suggestions in the work of Teresa de la Parra, it would not be until 1991 that another Venezuelan writer would publish a narrative work that addressed female homosexuality. This work was the collection of short stories Noche con nieve y amantes and came from the hand of the poet and narrator Dinapiera Di Donato, who thus became the first to openly explore lesbianism in Venezuelan literature.

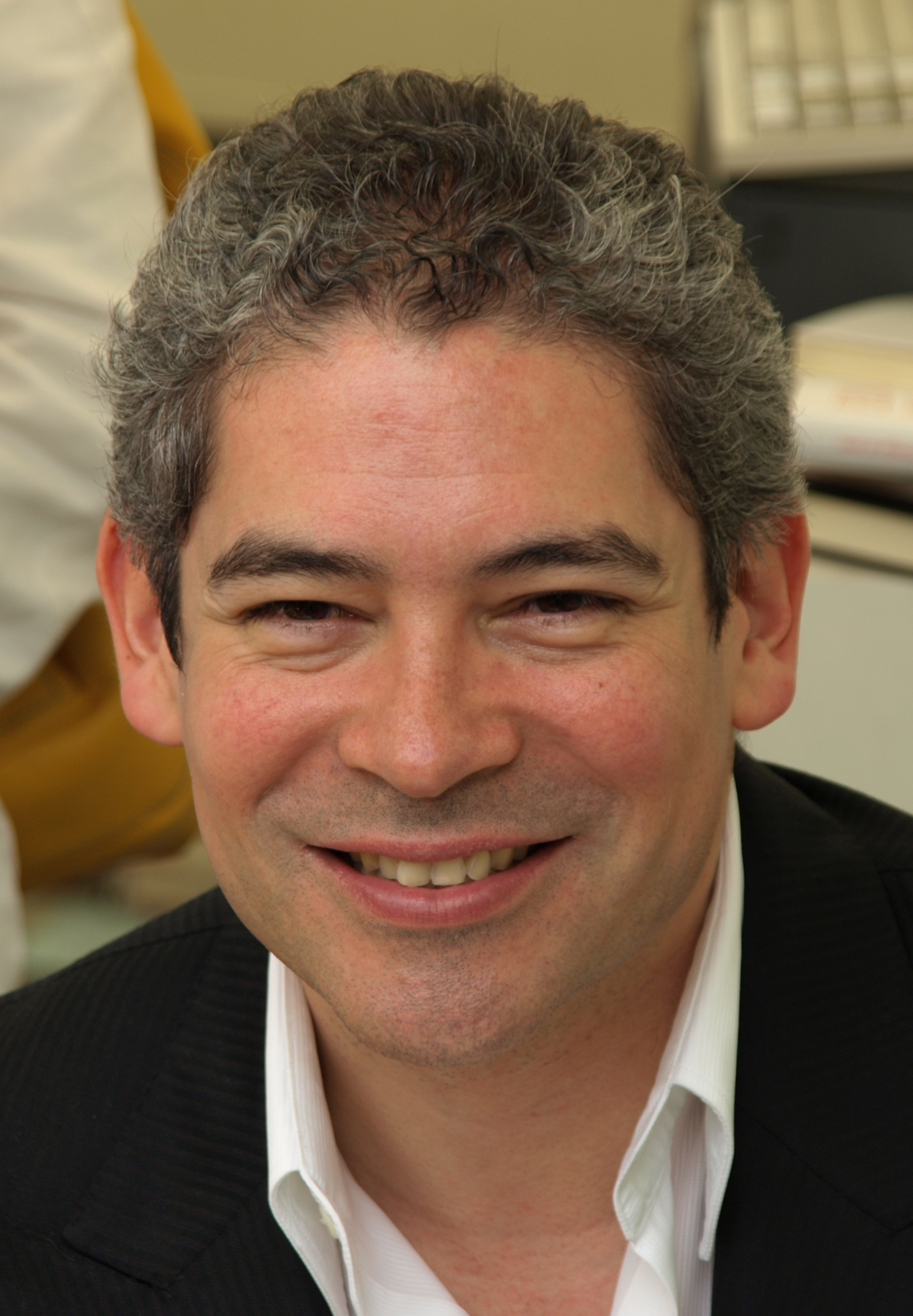
Boris Izaguirre, author of the novel The Flight of the Ostriches (1991).

The year 1991 also brought the publication of The Flight of the Ostriches, the first novel by Boris Izaguirre and which, unlike previous works on male homosexuality, approached the subject in a much more joyful and ironic way. Described by the author as a "Caribbean Huckleberry Finn", the novel has as its protagonist a dwarf gay man who moves to Caracas in the late 1980s. Izaguirre continued to explore sexual diversity in his later novels, including Azul gasolina (1999) and 1965 (2002), the second of which deals with the construction of the identity of the migrant homosexual man.

On the nonfiction side, the Venezuelan writer Gisela Kozak began to address female homosexuality from the academy starting in 1996. This decade also saw the appearance of several books of Venezuelan poetry with lesbian texts, including: The Art of Loss (1991) and The Long Journey Home (1994) by Verónica Jaffé; Olimpya (1992) by Manón Kübler; and Sextinario (1999) by Ana Nuño. Another notable figure in Venezuelan LGBT poetry at the end of the century was Esdras Parra, a trans poet Santacrusense.

== 21st century ==
The beginning of the 21st century was marked by the publication of the novel The Lord's Favorite (2001) by Ana Teresa Torres, considered one of the most important erotic lesbian novels in Venezuelan literature. The work, which was a finalist for the La Sonrisa Vertical Award, follows the story of an Arab woman skilled in the arts of love who is brought to Middle Ages Europe.

Isaac Chocrón's works from these years also saw a positive change in the representation of LGBT characters, from the tragic endings of his works from the last century, pieces such as Pronombres personales (2002), El vergel (2005) and Navega'os (2006) began to show homosexual characters of different ages who have stopped suffering persecution and who are now an integral part of the societies they inhabit.

Although works such as The Lord's Favorite and those by Chocrón began to address homosexuality more openly and with less prejudice, in general, a considerable part of the representations in the literature of the early 21st century continued to have negative or ambiguous connotations regarding sexual diversity. The micro-stories "Delicate Matters of the Jungle" (2010) and "Swan's Way" (2011), written by Alberto Barrera Tyszka and Enrique Plata, for example, showed homosexuality among men as a characteristic incompatible with masculinity and one that leads to contempt and rejection. Death as the final destiny of the homosexual subject also continues to appear during this time in stories such as False Appearances (2004) by Chocrón and Tell Me How Many Rivers Are Made of Your Tears (2015) by Jorge Rodríguez Gómez.

A more ambiguous vision of sexual diversity, however, appeared in authors such as Rodrigo Blanco Calderón and Ángel Gustavo Infante. In the case of Blanco Calderón, his story "Una larga fila de hombres" (A Long Line of Men) (2007) tells the story of a man who begins to fantasize about having sex with another man and who claims the fact of being penetrated as a show of courage and manliness. However, at the last moment he changes his mind and savagely beats the man he was with. "Una mujer por siempre nunca" (A Woman Forever After) (2014), by Infante, is similar in its awakening of homoerotic desire in a heterosexual man. In the story, a young man moves into a boarding house run by a homosexual named Elio and the two become friends. Although in the end the protagonist abandons Elio to the mercy of danger, curiosity had previously led him to explore his sexuality with him:

We drank in silence, and Elio's figure grew until it enveloped me in the satin robes. Time ceased to matter to me. Only a few intimate minutes surrounded my sudden erection and Elio's fellatio skills, and they fitted into the sofa as I grabbed his shaved ass to penetrate it slowly, fearfully, disgustingly well.

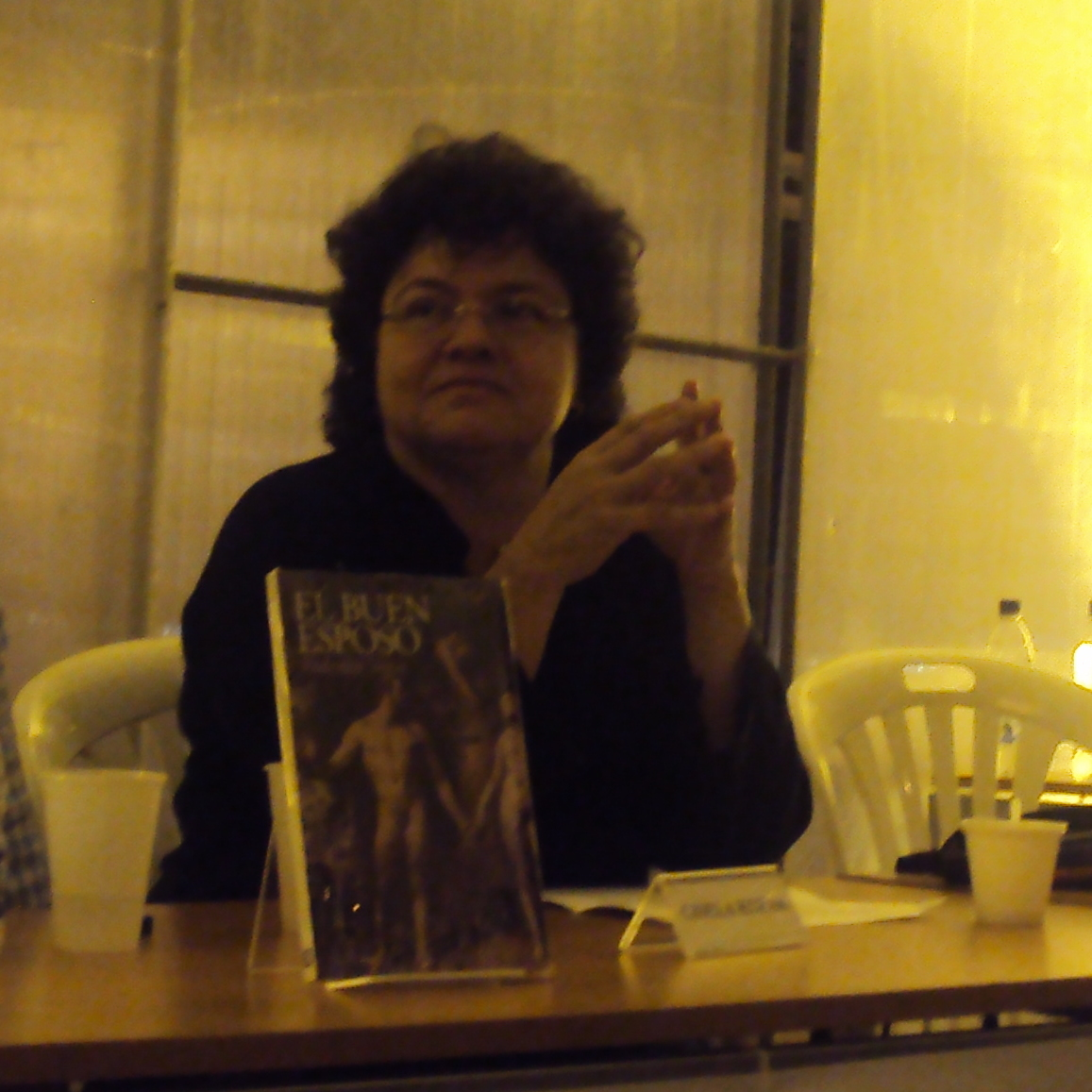
Gisela Kozak in 2013.

Taking a more subversive approach to questioning heteronormativity is the writing of Gisela Kozak, a writer who has included lesbian plots in several of her works, starting with stories such as "Dead Can Dance" and "Behind Desire," from the book Sins of the Capital. The theme reappears repeatedly in her book of political stories En Rojo (2011), as well as in her novel All the Moons (2011). This work, which presents the stories of several women in a fragmented manner, shows a society that has left censorship and prejudice behind and where homosexuality is fully accepted. In the midst of this utopia, one of the protagonists discovers the pleasure of loving another woman.

The political situation resulting from the Bolivarian Revolution has also had an effect on recent Venezuelan LGBT literature. The topic is explored in several of Kozak's stories, as well as in the work of writers such as Manuel Gerardo Sánchez, who published the novel El revuelo de los insectos in 2020, a work about a Caribbean country in which a revolutionary establishes a dystopian authoritarian regime while a group of men begin to discover their sexuality. Sánchez, who emigrated from Venezuela to Spain, continued exploring the theme in later years, such as in his novel En verano duele más (2023), which features a Lebanese migrant teenager who is rejected by his family because of his sexual orientation and who was abused as a child.

In recent years, various initiatives have sought to promote greater visibility of Venezuelan LGBT literature, including national LGBT poetry competitions. There has also been more interest in the topic from the nonfiction perspective, with works such as Historia del movimiento LGTBI en Venezuela 1970-2000 / 2001-2021'' (2022), considered the first historical book on LGBT activism in Venezuela.

== See also ==
- Literature of Venezuela
- LGBTQ rights in Venezuela
- LGBTQ literature in Colombia
- LGBTQ literature in Brazil

== Sources ==
- Bermúdez, Steven (2022). "Los entornos emocionales homoeróticos en la cuentística venezolana" (PDF). Textos y contextos (in Spanish) (24). ISSN 1390-695X. Archived from the original (PDF) on 2022-06-19.
- Hernández, Wilfredo (2013). "De la 'loca' rebelde al gay integrado: representaciones del sujeto homosexual en la dramaturgia de Isaac Chocrón (1971–2006)". In Patricia Valladares-Ruiz; Leonora Simonovi (eds.). El tránsito vacilante. Foro Hispánico (in Spanish). Vol. 47. Brill. pp. 217–243. ISBN 978-94-012-1014-0.
- Kozak, Gisela (2008). "El lesbianismo en Venezuela es asunto de pocas páginas: literatura, nación, feminismo y modernidad". Revista Iberoamericana (in Spanish). 74 (225): 999–1017. doi:10.5195/reviberoamer.2008.8190. ISSN 0034-9631.
- Varderi, Alejandro (2006). "Ser gay en Venezuela: Literatura y homosexualidad por las tierras de Bolívar". Orientaciones (11). ISSN 1576-978X.
