= Manuel Díaz Rodríguez =

Venezuelan writer and politician

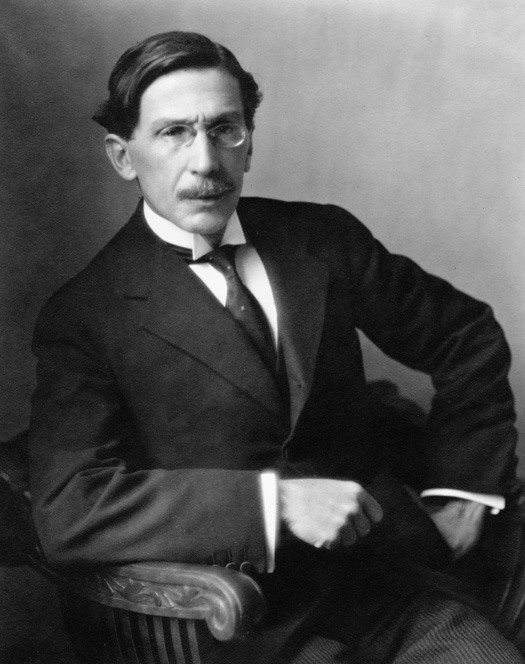

144th Minister of Foreign Affairs of Venezuela
- In office 9 December 1913 – 22 October 1914
- President: Juan Vicente Gómez
- Preceded by: José Ladislao Andara
- Succeeded by: Ignacio Andrade

Personal details
- Born: 28 February 1871 Caracas, Venezuela
- Died: 24 August 1927 (aged 56) New York City, United States
- Resting place: Southern General Cemetery
- Spouse: Graziella Calcaño (m. 1899; died 1927)
- Children: 1
- Parent(s): Juan Díaz; Dolores Rodríguez
- Profession: Writer, diplomat, physician
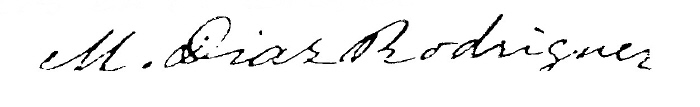
- Signature

Manuel Díaz Rodríguez (28 February 1871 – 24 August 1927), was a Venezuelan writer, journalist, physician, diplomat and politician. He is considered one of the greatest representatives of the Hispanic modernismo movement.

== Biography ==
He was born on February 28, 1871, at Hacienda Los Dolores (nowadays Altamira); in Chacao, Miranda state as the youngest of the eleven children of Juan Díaz Chávez and María Dolores Rodríguez Coyada, Canarians immigrants; arrived in Caracas in 1842. His siblings were: María Isabel de los Ángeles (1845), Antonio Epifanio de los Dolores (1848), Isabel Marcelina de los Dolores (1850), Rita Merchora de Jesús (1853), Josefa María (1856), Antonio María (1858), María de los Dolores Bárbara de Jesús (1860), Magdalena de Jesús (1862), María del Carmen Canuta (1865) and Juan (1868).

He studied Medicine at the Central University of Venezuela, where he was a student of Adolf Ernst and traveled to Europe to deepen and perfect his scientific knowledge. He lived in Paris and Vienna, where he became interested in the theories of Sigmund Freud and where he settled for two years, making occasional trips to Italy and Constantinople. He mastered four languages and from his youth was an avid reader, which determined that his inclination for literature prevailed over his medical career.

In 1895, he returned to Venezuela and was one of the founders of the Venezuelan Red Cross; along with Francisco Antonio Rísquez, Pablo Acosta Ortiz and Luis Razetti.

His first book, Sensaciones de viaje, was published in Paris in 1896. His triumph as a writer was immediate when he obtained the prize from the Academia Venezolana de la Lengua.

When Díaz Rodríguez returned to Venezuela he joined the group of intellectuals who had gathered around the magazines El Cojo Ilustrado and Cosmopolis (magazine). He will be one of the members of the so-called Generation of 1898 in Venezuela alongside Pedro Emilio Coll, Luis Manuel Urbaneja Achelpohl, Pedro César Dominici, César Zumeta and Gabriel Zambrano. The first years of his life as a writer were quite fruitful, since in 1897 he published Confidencias de Psiquis, with a prologue by Pedro Emilio Coll, and in 1898 he published De mis Romerías, a travel book; In each print he associates the beauty of the cities with the beauty of the women who live in them. For this reason, a controversy begins with the Church and with some conservative writers; who consider the book a pagan and sensual work and try, in vain; boycott the award from the Venezuelan Academy of Language.

In 1899, after getting married, he returned to Paris and published Cuentos de Color, nine stories that have the name of a specific color which, associated with a state of the soul, constitutes the atmosphere of each story.

He returned to Venezuela in 1901. At that time he had left medicine and dedicated himself completely to writing. He publishes his first novel, Ídolos rotos, which questions the social, political and cultural state that was experienced in Venezuela during the time of Cipriano Castro, whom he openly opposes. The following year he published his second novel in Madrid, Sangre Patricia (which he had initially thought of calling “Uvas del Trópico”), in which he raised the issue of the Civil war. With it completed what some critics consider the first and best stage of Díaz Rodríguez's work.

After the death of his father in 1902, he took refuge in the hacienda to avoid bankruptcy. A long retreat of almost seven years will begin for him in the midst of absolute literary silence but where he observes the life of the peasants, accumulating experiences for a novel that he will write years later, Peregrina or El Pozo Encantado.

In 1909, after the fall of Cipriano Castro's political regime and the rise to power of Juan Vicente Gómez, Díaz Rodríguez came out of his rural retirement; He took charge of the management of the newspaper El Progresista and there he made his first political weapons, along with other renowned writers; such as Rufino Blanco Fombona, Pedro Manuel Arcaya and César Zumeta, from whom he soon separated and became a collaborator of Gómez; beginning his political career. For seventeen years he held different high positions in the Gómez administration, such as Rector academia of the Central University of Venezuela, director of Higher Education and Fine Arts at the Ministry of Education (Venezuela) in 1911, Minister of Foreign Affairs between 1913 and 1914, Senator for the Bolívar state in 1915, Minister of Development in 1916, Envoy (title) of Venezuela in Italy from 1919 until 1923, Head of Government of the states Nueva Esparta (1925) and Sucre (1926).

In 1910, he published Camino de Perfección; which is an essay about vanity and pride, where the cover illustration of the first edition, it is the work of the famous Venezuelan painter Tito Salas. In 1918; Sermones Líricos and in Madrid, in 1926, Peregrina, (which he had devised with the title “Barro Criollo”). The same year he became a member of the National Academy of History.

Then, he traveled to Buenos Aires as representative of Venezuela at the Fourth Pan-American Conference.

In 1911, he inherited the Hacienda San José from his mother; dedicated to the cultivation and processing of sugar cane.

Later he returned to Italy and inaugurated the Plaza Bolívar on the Monte Sacro.

== Marriage and family ==
On July 7, 1899, he married Graziella Calcaño (daughter of Eduardo Calcaño, who was a Colombian-Venezuelan speaker, writer, lawyer, journalist and politician; minister of foreign affairs and plenipotentiary minister in Spain; at the same time, Graziella was the second cousin of Mary Calcaño and the third cousin of Graciela Rincón Calcaño and María Calcaño) and they returned to Paris. Back in Venezuela, they had a daughter: Yolanda Margarita (June 10, 1905 - January 18, 1955), married in 1925; with her cousin, the doctor Fermín José Díaz (April 20, 1895 - June 28, 1953); who was the son of Antonio María. In addition, they had three grandchildren: Graciela Dolores (1926-2021), Gloria (1927-2018) and Manuel Antonio Díaz (1933-2014), seven great-grandchildren: Héctor Manuel (1950-2010), Daniel (1952) and Jorge Machado (1956), children of Graciela and Fermín (1960-2017), Carlos Manuel (1961), Yolanda (1966) and Miguel Ángel Díaz (1971), children of Manuel Antonio and twelve great-great-grandchildren.

== Death ==
Victim of a serious throat illness, Manuel Díaz Rodríguez moved in May 1927; to New York, where he was admitted to the New York Cancer Hospital on August 9, 1927, and died on August 24 of that year, of lymphosarcoma. He was buried in the Calvary Cemetery (Queens) until September of that same year; where the remains were exhumed and transferred to Venezuela, until being buried in the Southern General Cemetery.

== Bibliography ==
- Sensaciones de Viajes(1896)
- Confesiones de Psiquis (1897)
- De mis romerías (1898)
- Cuentos de Color (1899)
- Ídolos rotos (1901)
- Sangre Patricia (1902)
- Camino de Perfección (1910)
- Sermones líricos(1918)
- Peregrina o el Pozo encantado (1922)

== See also ==
- Literature of Venezuela
- List of Venezuelan writers
- List of ministers of foreign affairs of Venezuela

== Bibliography ==
- (in Spanish) Biography at Venezuelatuya.com
- (in Spanish) Biography of the Mayorship of Chacao
- (in Spanish) Biography by Pedro Díaz Seijas

Political offices
Preceded by José Ladislao Andara	144th Minister of Foreign Affairs of Venezuela; 9 December 1913 – 22 October 1914	Succeeded by Ignacio Andrade
