= Calcaño =

Calcaño is a surname. Notable people with the surname include:

- Héctor Calcaño (1894–1969), Argentine actor
- María Calcaño (1906–1956), Venezuelan poet
- Mary Calcaño (1906–1992), first Venezuelan woman to be granted a pilot's licence
- Graciela Rincón Calcaño (1904–1987), Venezuelan writer and poet
- Rafael Devers Calcaño (born 1996), Dominican baseball player
