= El vuelo de los avestruces =

- Author: Boris Izaguirre
- Language: Spanish
- Published: 1991
- Publication place: Venezuela

El vuelo de los avestruces (lit. 'The Flight of the Ostriches') is the debut novel by Venezuelan writer Boris Izaguirre, published in 1991, starring a homosexual dwarf in Caracas in the late eighties and early nineties.

== History ==
El vuelo de los avestruces was the second highest selling book of the year after its publication and was mentioned in Britannica Book of the Year along with other Latin-American novels. Unlike previous works on male homosexuality published in Venezuela, it approached the subject in a much more lighthearted and ironic manner.

The novel was republished in 2006 under the publishing house Alpha Decay.

== See also ==
- LGBTQ literature in Venezuela
