= Jesús Rosas Marcano =

- Born: 5 January 1930; La Asunción, Nueva Esparta
- Died: 7 May 2001 (aged 71); Caracas
- Occupations: journalist, poet, writer

Jesús Rosas Marcano (5 January 1930 – 7 May 2001) was a Venezuelan educator, journalist, poet and composer of folk songs popularized by the group Un Solo Pueblo, such as "Botaste la bola" and "Negro como yo".

== Early life and education ==
Rosas Marcano was born in La Asunción. In 1945, he graduated as a school teacher from the Miguel Antonio Caro Institute. He began his career at the Rural School Caurimare in east Caracas. Later, he studied journalism in the Central University of Venezuela (UCV), receiving his postgraduate education at the Sorbonne University of Paris.

== Career ==
In the late 1950s, Rosas Marcano began working as a teacher and researcher in his alma mater. He worked as a reporter for the newspaper Últimas Noticias, directed by Oscar Yánes, starting to write humorous verses under the pseudonym of Ross Mar. For twenty years, Rosas wrote the columns Capilla Ardiente and Espuma de los Días, both in the daily El Nacional.

In the 1980s, Rosas Marcano started the column Veinte Líneas in "El Diario de Caracas". He was columnist of weekly "Quinto Día", starting in 1998. In 1999, Rosas Marcano was invited to collaborate in "Así es la Noticia", where he returned with Capilla Ardiente. In the newspaper "Sol de Margarita", he wrote a weekly humor page under the name of Pata e 'cabra for the humorous newspaper Camaleón. As a poet, he created the works "Proclama de la espiga" (1958), "Cotiledón, Cotiledón, la vida" (1965), "Manso vidrio del aire" (1968), "Así en la tierra como en el cielo" (1976), among others. In his labor as school teacher, he worked in publications for children, including "Tricolor", "La ventana mágica" and "Onza, tigre y león".

== Death ==
Rosas Marcano died on May 7, 2001 in Caracas.

== See also ==
- Francisco Pacheco
- Literature of Venezuela
- List of Venezuelan writers
