= Ifigenia (film) =

- Directed by: Iván Feo
- Starring: Marialejandra Martín; Adriano González León; Jean Carlo Simancas; Cecilia Martínez; Vilma Ramia; Guillermo Feo; Elsa Martínez; Iván Feo
- Release date: 1987
- Country: Venezuela
- Language: Spanish

Ifigenia is a Venezuelan film directed by Iván Feo released in 1987 based on the novel of the same name by Teresa de la Parra.

== Plot ==
María Eugenia Alonso returns from Europe to impose logical thinking on her home, which focuses on tradition and race. María Eugenia proclaims her independence of spirit and her firm purpose to be guided by clear and logical ideas. She rejects an order in which she does not believe and which imposes absurdities: confinement, boredom, prudishness and prohibitions that oppose her desire to live. On one side is freedom, passion, uncompromising love and above all life. On the other, conformism, security and stability, respect for rules and the consequent social recognition. Between a grandmother and a crazy uncle, between an adventurous passion and a conventional marriage, María Eugenia finds herself involved in an overwhelming love triangle whose dangerous consequences will depend on her already prostrate will and will relentlessly decide her destiny.

== Cast ==
Actor	Character
Marialejandra Martin	María Eugenia Alonso
Jean Carlos Simancas	Gabriel Olmedo
Vilma Ramia	Mercedes Galindo
Enrique Aular	Perucho
Diana Insausti	María Antonia
Guillermo Feo García	Tío Eduardo
Elsa Martínez	Tía Clara
Iván Feo	César Leal
Special participations
Adriano González León	Tío Pancho
Cecilia Martínez	La Abuela
Luis Castro Leiva	Alberto Galindo

== Production ==
The film was the First Film-School of the Central University of Venezuela. Its script was produced in the corresponding screenwriting workshops and since its production, it was planned to be divided into seven (7) Learning Areas, where 42 students, selected and trained, participated.

== Awards ==
- Festival internacional de cinema de expressão ibérica, Arcos de Valdevez (1987): Grand Prize, ex aequo with Matador by Pedro Almodóvar and Opera do Malandro by Ruy Guerra.
- Bogota Film Festival (1986): Special Jury Award.
- National Association Of Cinematographic Authors (1987):
  - Best Production Award;
  - Best Supporting Actor Award;
  - Best Costume Design Award.
- Culture Commission of the Cabildo of Caracas, Feature Films Section (1987):
  - Best Cinematography Award.
