= Eduardo Liendo =

Venezuelan writer and scholar (1941–2025)

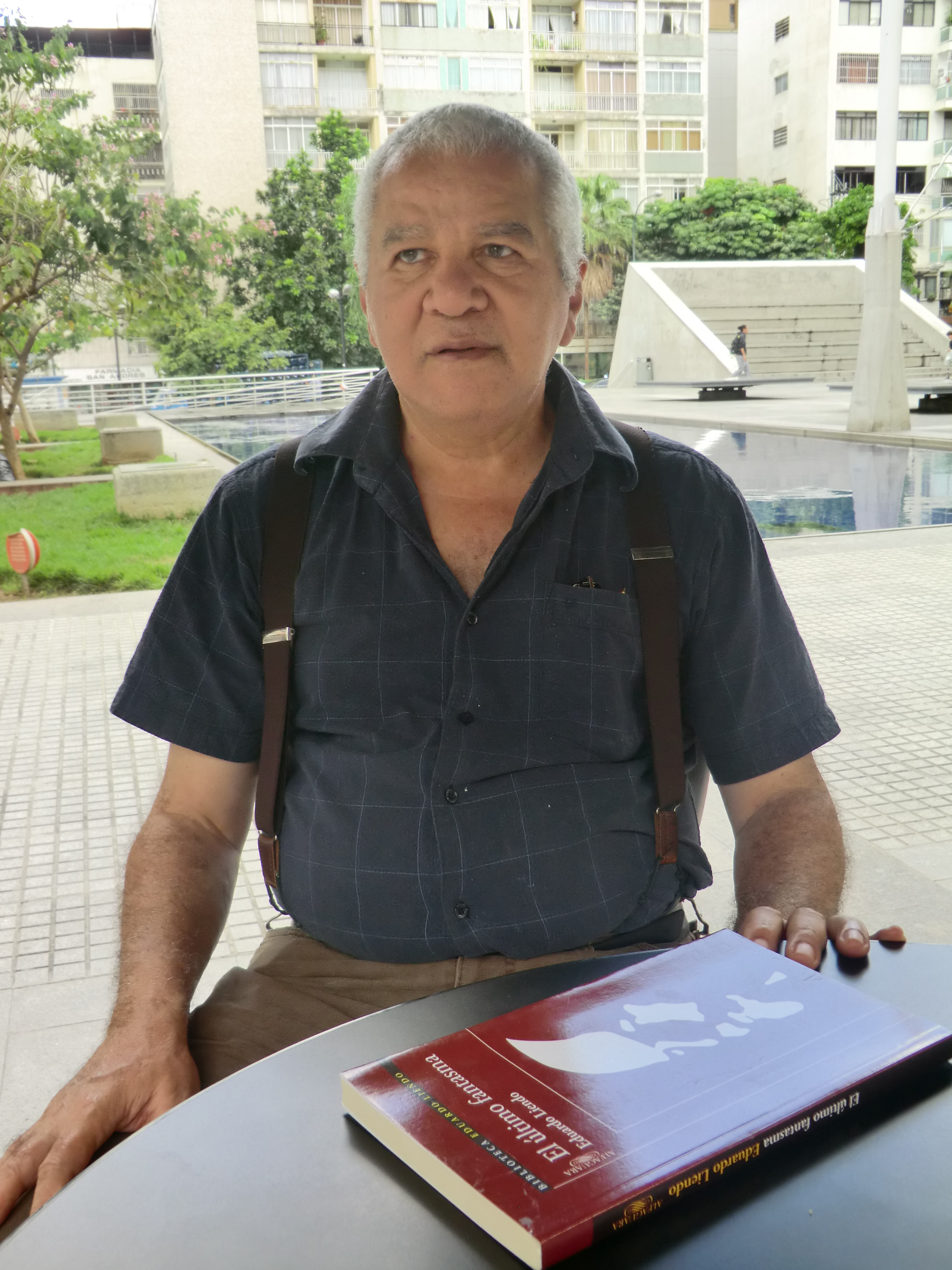
- Liendo in 2013
- Born: 12 January 1941; Caracas, Venezuela
- Died: 3 July 2025 (aged 84); Caracas, Venezuela
- Occupations: Novelist, writer
- Writing career
- Period: 1973–2025
- Notable work: El mago de la cara de vidrio (1973)

Eduardo Liendo Zurita (Spanish: [eðˈwaɾðo ˈljendo suˈɾita]; 12 January 1941 – 3 July 2025) was a Venezuelan writer and scholar. His novella Mascarada won Honorable Mention in the "Fiction City Award" (Caracas, 1978) and the Pedro León Zapata humor prize in 1981. In 1985, he received the Municipal Prize for Literature. and in 1990, the CONAC book award (from the former national council of culture of Venezuela). Liendo died on 3 July 2025, at the age of 84.

== Bibliography ==
- El mago de la cara de vidrio (1973)
- Los Topos (1975)
- Mascarada (1978)
- Los platos del diablo (1985)
- El cocodrilo rojo (1987)
- Si yo fuera Pedro Infante (1989)
- Diario del enano (1995)
- El round del olvido (2002)
- Las kuitas del hombre mosca (2005)
- Contraespejismo (2008)
- El último fantasma (2009)
- En torno al oficio de escritor (2014)
- Contigo en la distancia (2014)

== See also ==
- List of Venezuelan writers
