= Ídolos rotos =

1901 novel by Manuel Díaz Rodríguez

- Title page for Ídolos rotos (1919 edition)
- Author: Manuel Díaz Rodríguez
- Language: Spanish
- Genre: Novel
- Publication date: 1901
- Publication place: Venezuela
- Media type: Print

Ídolos rotos (Broken Idols) is a novel by the Venezuelan writer Manuel Díaz Rodríguez that was published in 1901. It is considered one of the most pessimistic novels written in Venezuela. It presents the social, political, and cultural life of people in Caracas with a defeatist attitude, where all hope of salvation has been abandoned. The central theme of the novel is the character Alberto Soria's failure in his effort to assert his ideals as an artist in Venezuela against a backdrop of the country's total decadence.

== Structure ==
The novel is divided into four parts and fifteen chapters.

The first part begins with the arrival of Alberto Soria who has been away in Paris for the past five years. His urgent return is motivated by the sudden illness of his father Don Pancho Soria. From the beginning of the novel, Alberto Soria is portrayed as being hypersensitive and behaving in an unhealthy and volatile manner. He has been uprooted from his country and out of touch with its problems. He had gone to Europe to study engineering, but once in Paris he abandoned his studies to become a sculptor. In his first contact with Caracas he is shocked by the environment. He feels maladjusted and out of place. He is bothered by the dirty streets and the poor architectural taste that predominates in the city. From his siblings Rosa and Pedro, he begins to realize the prevailing mediocrity and unhappiness that envelopes his ancestral home.

In the second part of the novel Alberto Soria's maladjustment to the Venezuelan environment increases. The process begins in his family when his father confesses his unhappiness at not having achieved his ambitions through his children. Next he finds out about the drama surrounding his sister Rosa who is married to Uribe, a man of low social status who is fond of games and deceit. He also notices the weak personality of his brother Pedro who acts according to the vagaries of politics. The climax of the crisis occurs when Alberto discovers that in Venezuela his status as an artist is questioned, which incites him to transform himself into a true creator, but he hesitates, assailed by fears and doubts. Little by little he isolates himself from others until he begins to associate only with nonconformists and intellectuals who think like himself and with whom he forms a reactionary bubble against the atmosphere of the times.

In the third part, the character shows an apparent change of conduct motivated by his love for María Almeida. Alberto intensifies his activity as a sculptor and finishes a Creole Venus that doesn't completely satisfy him. Despite that he stages an unsuccessful exhibition in a coffee shop near to the Plaza Bolívar in Caracas. Alberto Soria soon suffers an inexplicable change regarding the love that he feels for María Almeida and begins to experience strange mood swings due to unfounded jealousy, a product of his own mind. The third part of the novel ends with the death of his father.

The fourth part of the novel narrates the start and the evolution of the love between Alberto Soria and Teresa Farías, a strange and adulterous woman. Alberto begins to make a sculpture of his lover, but is soon discovered by his girlfriend and his sister. Soon a new civil war plunges the country in anarchy. After the triumph of the revolution the country falls in the hands of the populace and the military. Alberto goes to the School of Fine Arts, which has been turned into a barracks, and finds that his works have been mutilated and desecrated by the soldiers. At this point he gives up everything and decides to emigrate to safeguard his aesthetic ideals.

== Themes ==
Degradation is a central theme in the novel. It satirizes the society of Venezuela, particularly vices such as prostitution.

== Publication ==
Ídolos rotos was Díaz Rodríguez's first novel, written while living in Paris in 1899 and 1900. It was published in Paris in 1901, and in Madrid in 1919.

== See also ==
- Latin American literature
- Venezuelan literature

== Sources ==
- Dunham, Lowell (1992). De Oklahoma a Venezuela: estudios de literatura venezolana [From Oklahoma to Venezuela: Venezuelan Literature Studies] (in Spanish). Los Teques: Intevep. ISBN 980-259-530-6 – via Internet Archive.
- Medina, Jesus David (1998). "Principios para una teoría de la novela Venezolana del siglo XIX y comienzos del siglo XX" [Principles for a Theory of the Venezuelan Novel in the 19th and Early 20th Centuries]. Literatura y lingüística (in Spanish). doi:10.4067/S0716-58111998001100015.
- Ratcliff, Dillwyn F. (1933). Venezuelan Prose Fiction. Cincinnati: Mountel Press Co. OCLC 3634063 – via Internet Archive.
