= Memorias de Mamá Blanca =

Fictionalized memoir by Teresa de la Parra

Mama Blanca's Memoirs
- Author: Teresa de la Parra
- Original title: Memorias de Mamá Blanca
- Language: Spanish
- Publication date: 1929
- Publication place: Venezuela
- English publication date: 1959

Memorias de Mamá Blanca (Mama Blanca's Memoirs), published in 1929, is a nostalgia-filled fictionalized memoir of Venezuelan author Teresa de la Parra's childhood. The spirit of the four sisters living on the hacienda Tazón is reflected in the six sisters living on the hacienda Piedra Azul. The moral "correctness" of Mama Blanca's Memoirs received favorable attention from those who had criticized Iphigenia. In her letters, de la Parra wrote that there was no Iphigenia scent in Souvenirs of Mama Blanca, which had no protest speech, revolutionary ideas or social criticism.

De la Parra became a sought-after lecturer. Her more important speeches took place in Havana and Bogotá; this last one was very meaningful about her personal ideas of women's roles in American society from colonial times to the 20th century.
