= Ana García-Siñeriz =

Spanish television presenter

- Born: Ana María Aurora García-Siñeriz Alonso; 26 July 1965 (age 60); Oviedo, Spain
- Occupation: TV Presenter
- Spouse: Gauthier Peyrouzet (m. 1997)
- Children: 2

Ana María Aurora García-Siñeriz Alonso (born 26 July 1965) is a Spanish TV presenter.

She has a bachelor's degree in journalism from the Universidad Complutense de Madrid and a master's degree in radio from Radio Nacional de España. She worked in Lo + plus and Magacine in Canal+. She was the presenter, along with Boris Izaguirre, of TV show Channel nº4, which aired on Cuatro from 2005 to 2008. She is married to Gauthier Peyrouzet and has two children: Mateo (b. 1997) and Chloe (b. 2000).

== Television ==
- Hablando claro (1988-1989) (TVE)
- Primer plano (1993–1994) (Canal+)
- Lo + plus (1995–2005) (Canal+)
- Magacine (1996-2002) (Canal+)
- Channel nº 4 (2005–2008) with Boris Izaguirre (Cuatro)
- Matinal Cuatro with a Daniel Serrano y Roger Persiva (2010) (Cuatro).

== Bibliography ==
- Bebé a bordo, 2000
- Esas mujeres rubias, 2010
- Nueve meses y un día, 2012

She has also published, along with illustrator Jordi Labanda, a series of children's storybooks centered on a character named Zoé.
