= Elías Pino Iturrieta =

Venezuelan writer and historian (born 1944)

Elías Pino
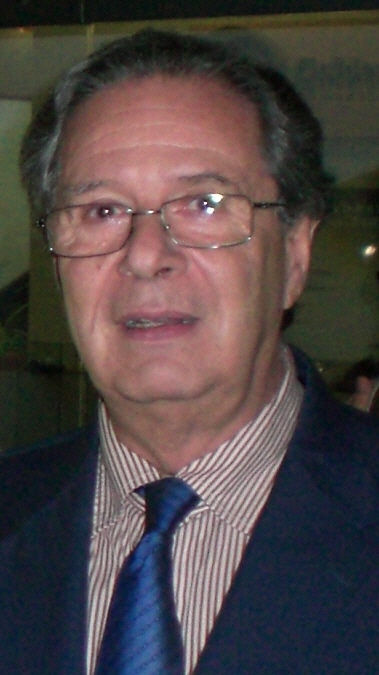
- Elías Pino Iturrieta en 2008.
- Born: Elías Pino Iturrieta; October 9, 1944 (age 81); Maracaibo, Venezuela
- Occupations: historian, writer

Signature
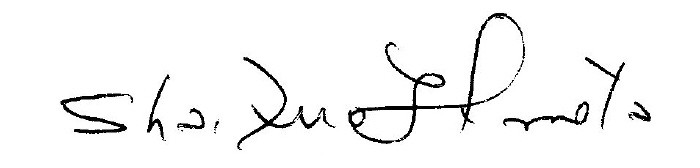

Elías Pino Iturrieta (born 9 October 1944 in Maracaibo, Venezuela) is a Venezuelan writer and historian. He served as Director of the Venezuelan Academy of History, which he joined on 27 February 1997. Is Director of the Institute for Historical Research at Andrés Bello Catholic University, since 1999. He graduated from UCV in 1962, and obtained a doctorate from El Colegio de México in 1969.

== Works ==
- La mentalidad venezolana de la Emancipación
- Contra lujuria castidad
- Ventaneras y castas
- Diabólicas y honestas
- La mirada del otro
- Viajeros extranjeros en la Venezuela del siglo XIX
- Fueros, civilización y ciudadanía,
- Venezuela metida en cintura
- País archipiélago
- El Divino Bolívar
- Nada sino un hombre
- Ideas y mentalidades de Venezuela

== See also ==
- Venezuela
- List of Venezuelan writers
- List of Venezuelans
