= Manuel Pérez Vila =

Venezuelan historian (1922–1991)

Manuel Pérez Vila (3 September 1922 in Girona, Spain – 8 May 1991 in Caracas, Venezuela) was a Venezuelan historian and professor.

== Bibliography ==
- Una biografía de José Rafael Revenga (1953)
- Vida de Daniel Florencio O'Leary, primer edecán del Libertador (1957)
- Las campañas periodísticas del Libertador (1968)
- La Caricatura Política En El Siglo XIX (1979)
- Para acercarnos a Bolívar (1980)

== See also ==
- List of Venezuelan writers
