= Gisela Kozak =

Venezuelan writer and researcher

Gisela Kozak Rovero
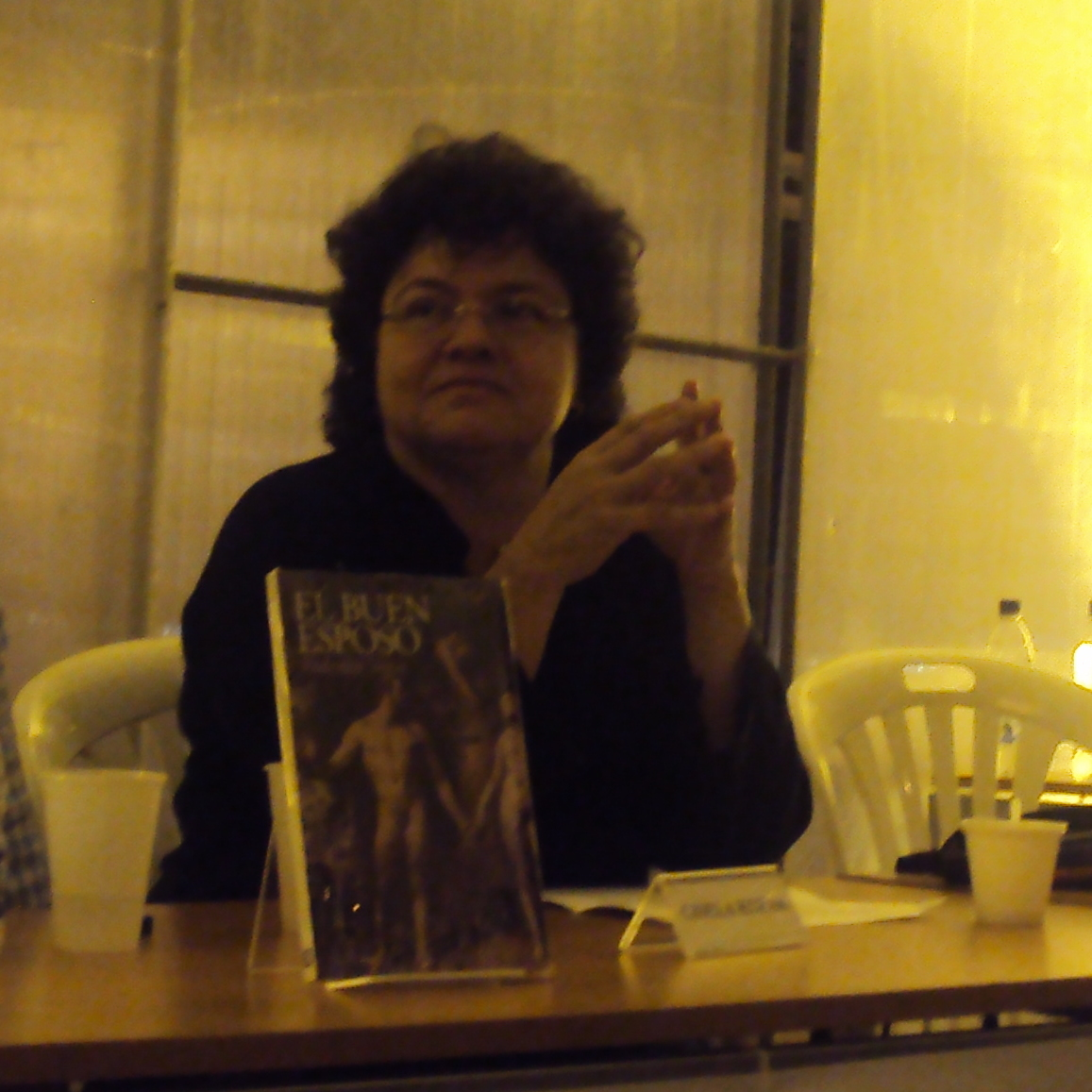
- Kozak at the 2013 Baruta's Book Festival.
- Born: October 20, 1963 (age 62); Caracas, Venezuela
- Education: Universidad Central de Venezuela
- Occupations: Writer, essayist, teacher and researcher

Gisela Kozak Rovero (born 20 October 1963) is a Venezuelan writer, essayist, teacher and researcher.

== Education and career ==
Kozak started writing when she was eight years old, as a game, imitating other authors such as Oscar Wilde and the Brothers Grimm. She graduated with a degree in literature from the Central University of Venezuela and afterwards obtained a PhD in the Simón Bolívar University.

She has worked as a cultural policies advisor, as a consultant for both public and private organizations in Venezuela and as a collaborator with the Spanish Cooperation Agency and the Goethe-Institut in the formation of cultural managers. She has also engaged in political activism and organized essay and narration workshops in the Literature School, as well as in the Catalan Institution for Research and Advanced Studies.

Kosak has also been an invited faculty for the Latin American Faculty of Social Sciences, Dominican Republic, and as a lecturer for several universities.

== Personal life ==
Kozak is openly lesbian.

== Publications ==
- Siete sellos: crónicas de la Venezuela Revolucionaria (2017)

=== Essays ===
- Rebelión en el Caribe hispánicoː urbes e historias más allá del boom y la posmodernidad (Caracas, Ediciones La Casa de Bello) (1993)
- La catástrofe imaginaríaː cultura, saber, tecnología, instituciones (Caracas, Planeta-Celarg) (1998)
- Venezuela, el país que siempre naceː literatura, política y pasión de historia (Caracas: Alfadil) (2007)
- Literatura asediada: revoluciones políticas, culturales y sociales (2012)
- Ni tan chéveres ni tan iguales. El «cheverismo» venezolano y otras formas del disimulo (2014)

=== Novels ===
- Rapsodia (1999)
- Vida de machos (2003)
- Latidos de Caracas (Caracas: Alfaguara) (2006)
- Todas las lunas (Caracas: Equinoccio) (2011)

=== Stories ===
- Pecados de la capital y otras historias (1997)
- En rojo, narración coral (Caracas: Alfa) (2011)

Kozak has also published several articles in national and international specialized magazines, compilations and congress' memoirs.

== Awards and recognitions ==
- 1997 Premio Armas Alfonzo por Pecados de la capital Biennial Award
- 1999 DAAD Intern in Germany
- 1999 Miguel Otero Silva Award Finalist (Editorial Planeta, for Latidos de Caracas)
- 2003 SACVEN Story Contest finalist (for Vida de machos)
- 2006 Enrique Bernardo Nuñez Essay Bienniel honorary mention Valencia Athenaeum (for Venezuela, el país que siempre naceː literatura, política y pasión de historia)
- 2009 Sylvia Molloy Award to the best academic article about gender and sexuality, awarded by the Latin American Studies Association (LASA, USA-Canada, for the article "El lesbianismo en Venezuela es asunto de pocas páginas")
- 2012 Critic Award finalist (for the novel Todas las lunas)
