= Lucía Raynero Morales =

Venezuelan historian (born 1955)

- Born: 3 December 1955 (age 69); Caracas, Venezuela
- Occupation(s): Andrés Bello Visiting Fellow, University of Oxford 2009 - 2010

Lucia Raynero Morales (Caracas, Venezuela, 3 December 1955) is a Venezuelan historian, Andrés Bello Visiting Fellow at the University of Oxford for 2009 - 2010 and a researcher at Andrés Bello Catholic University (UCAB). Before leaving to become the Bello Chair at Oxford, Raynero wrote a biography on José Gil Fortoul. She attended New York University's Multinational Institute of American Studies as a 1999 Fulbright Visiting Scholar. In 2009, Raynero was a member of the "La Independencia de Venezuela 200 años después" (Spanish: "The Independence of Venezuela 200 years later") general public judging committee.

== Early life and education ==
Lucía Raynero Morales was born on 3 December 1955 in Caracas, Venezuela. She earned a Bachelor of Education with an academic minor in Social Sciences from the Andrés Bello Catholic University on 22 October 1982. On 31 March 1989, Raynero earned her Master of Arts in History of the Americas, summa cum laude from the same university.

In 1999, Raynero attended New York University's Multinational Institute of American Studies as a Visiting Fulbright Scholar.

Raynero received her Doctor of Philosophy in history, summa cum laude, on 28 April 2006 from Andrés Bello. Raynero published her thesis as La concepción de la historia en la historiografía venezolana del siglo XIX, 1830–1865 (Spanish: The conception of history in Venezuelan historiography of the 19th century, from 1830 to 1865).

== Career ==
In 1982, Raynero obtained her educational license and became an assistant professor teaching seminars on the history of Venezuela. From 1989 to 1994, she taught Contemporary History and Eastern Civilizations at the Universidad Metropolitana. In 1990, Raynero also began teaching concurrently at UCAB. She became a full-time UCAB School of Education associate professor in 1993. Raynero began teaching upper level subjects, III and IV, in History as a full professor. In 2007, she became the Department Head of the Social Sciences college. Also in 2007, Raynero became a researcher for UCAB's Center for Humanistic Research and Training.

== Selected bibliography ==
- La nocion de libertad en los politicos venezolanos del siglo XIX (2001). Caracas: UCAB
- Juan Vicente Gonzalez (2006).Caracas: El Nacional/Banco del Caribe
- Clio frente al espejo (2007). Caracas: Academia Nacional de la Historia
- Rafael Maria Baralt (2007). Caracas: El Nacional/Bancaribe
- Jose Gil Fortoul (2009). Caracas: El Nacional/Fundacion Bancaribe
