= Natividad Barroso =

Venezuelan writer and academic

Natividad Barroso Garcia (born 1937) is a Venezuelan investigator of ethno-folklore, essayist and Venezuelan poet. She is co-founder and member of the Association of Writers of Lara State and a university professor with a range of scientific and humanistic interests that go from literature and linguistic to the anthropology and the ethnology.

== Biography ==
Born in Santa Cruz de Tenerife, she received a bachelor's degree in literature from the Central University of Venezuela and a postgraduate degree in ethno-folklore and comparative literature at the same institution. She was born in the Canary Islands and lives in Barquisimeto, Lara, Venezuela.

A literacy program, The Hour of the Resonance, was created by her in 1982 to develop an interest in reading and literature in the economically depressed villages of Barquisimeto, the state capital of Lara, Venezuela. The programme has been remarkable successful and has been recognized by the International Reading Association, an organization of literacy professionals.

In April 1999, the Button to the Merit City of Barquisimeto was award to her in that recognition of her contribution towards cultural and social progress in Venezuela. In November 2007, she was awarded with the Roberto Montesinos Prize of Literature of the Lara state. In the same year with the award for the Cultural Legacy of Lara State, an honor that few people have received while still alive.

She is a contributor to several Venezuelan magazines on culture, such as the Revista Nacional de Cultura and El Impulso. She has been speaker and organizer of conferences and debates related to the academic areas of study of the arts and the culture in Venezuela.

== Literary work ==
- Four essays from the twilights (Caracas, Monte Ávila Editores Latinoamericana, Las formas del fuego collection, 2004)
- Unconscious Prose’s (Asela, 2005)
- Eros and Society (Ateneo Ciudad de Barquisimeto, 2007)

=== Anthologies ===
- This way. Poetic sample of Lara (1987).
- To imagine the distance. Larense poetry of the 20th century (2000).
- Poetic image of Barquisimeto (2002).
- The celebration of Zaragoza’s of the State Lara (2003).
- Floricanto: 58 larenses poetesses (2006).
- III Poetry Anthological of the Mérida State (2008).
- Or voice/Our Voice/Notre Vois of the Pen International Club (2005).
- Conjugating the voices of the publishing house Novel Art of Cordova, Argentina (2005).
- New voices (CELARG, 2006) Caracas.
- Narrators by the afternoon (Casa Nacional de Las Letras "Andrés Bello", 2008) Caracas.
- She appears in the third edition of the dictionary, Those who write in Venezuela. 18th to 19th Centuries (Caracas, Alfadil, 2006).
