= Ifigenia (novel) =

Book by Teresa de la Parra

- Title page for Ifigenia (1928 edition)
- Author: Teresa de la Parra
- Original title: Ifigenia
- Language: Spanish
- Publication date: 1924
- Publication place: Venezuela

Ifigenia (in English Iphigenia: Diary of a Young Girl Who Wrote Because She Was Bored) is a 1924 Venezuelan novel by Teresa de la Parra. Ifigenia marked a change in Latin American literature. The novel is a feminist critique of Caracan society in the early twentieth century. Strict moral rules are represented by the grandmother in this novel. The character of Gabriel Olmedo represents the new money and political ambition which was common at the time due to the expansion of the oil industry. Besides being a harsh criticism of society, Ifigenia offers an interior monologue from the perspective of its young female protagonist, who struggles with her obligation to contract a profitable marriage. A veiled criticism of the regime of Gomez can be seen in Ifigenia, although De la Parra would later defend him in the international press.

== Adaptions ==
A television version of this novel scripted by Salvador Garmendia, starring es:Amanda Gutiérrez and Leopoldo Regnault, premiered in 1979 on Venezolana de Television, a Venezuelan television network. Meanwhile, Venezuelan filmmaker Iván Feo filmed an eponymous movie in 1986. In 2008, the channel RCTV prepared and transmitted a new version by writer Martin Hahn, starring Marianela Gonzalez and Hugo Vasquez.

== See also ==
- LGBTQ literature in Venezuela
