= Rafael Arráiz Lucca =

Venezuelan historian (born 1959)

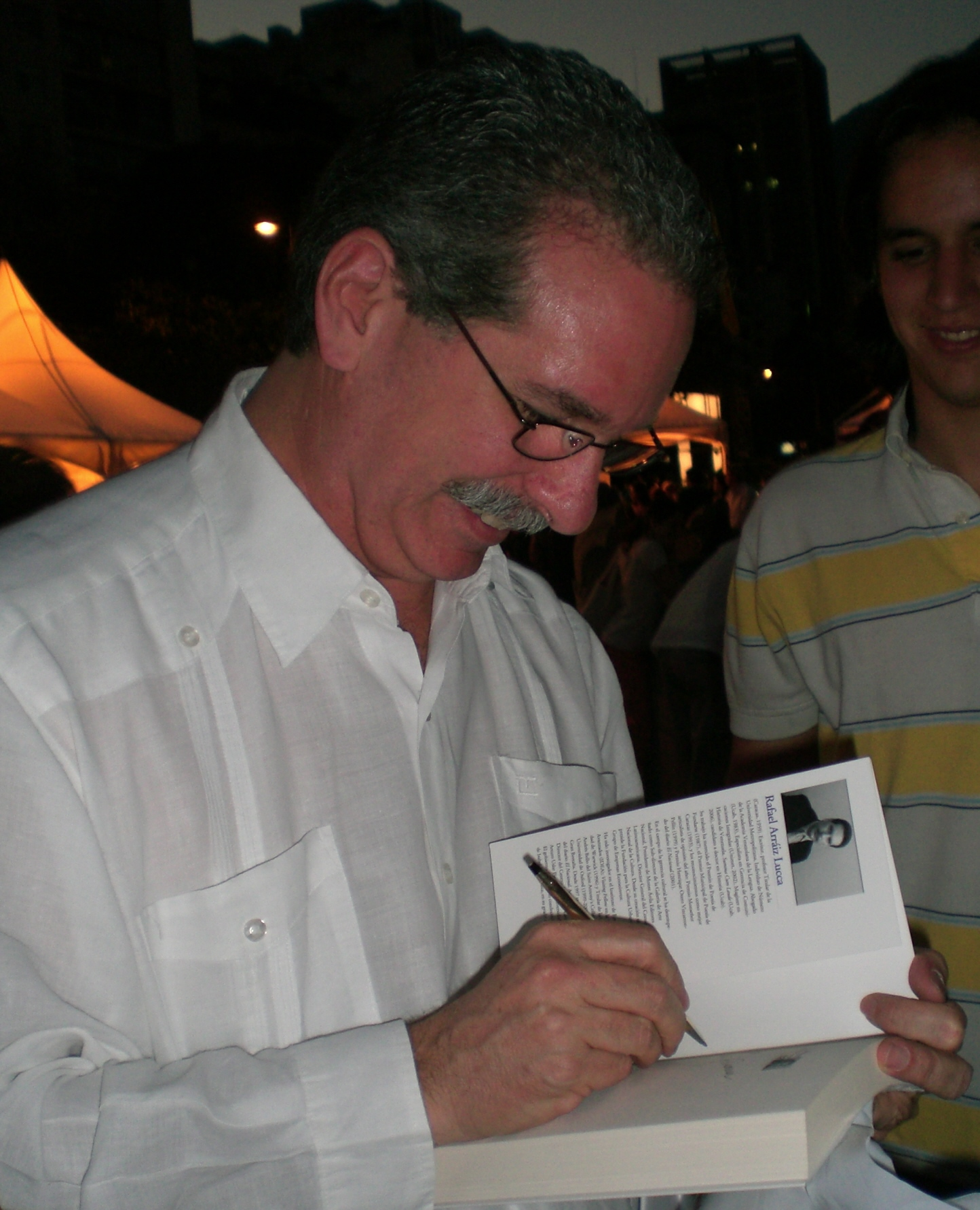
- Rafael Arráiz Lucca at the Chacao's book fair, April, 2009
- Born: 3 January 1959 (age 67); Caracas, Venezuela
- Occupations: historian, poet, professor, and writer.
- Writing career
- Genres: Poetry, history, essay

Rafael Arráiz Lucca (born 3 January 1959, Caracas) is a Venezuelan historian, essayist, poet, and professor.

== Career ==
Arraiz Lucca is a professor in the Metropolitan University of Caracas (UNIMET). Since 2001, has been in charge of the "Fundación Para la Cultura Urbana" (Foundation for Urban Culture), in Caracas. Became a lawyer in 1983 at the Andrés Bello Catholic University (UCAB), specialist in integrated communications in 2002 (UNIMET), in 2005 finished a mastership in history at the UCAB.

Has written many poem books including: Balizaje (1983), Terrenos (1985), Almacén (1988), Litoral (1991), Pesadumbre en Bridgetown (1992), Batallas (1995), Poemas Ingleses (1997), Reverón 25 poemas (1997) and Plexo Solar (2002). Has been the writer of some works of literature and history such as Venezuela: 1830 a nuestros días (Review of Venezuelan history from 1830), in 2007, and Literatura Venezolana del Siglo XX (Venezuelan literature of the 20th century), in 2009, and has contributed with some essay books: Venezuela en cuatro asaltos (1993), Trece lecturas venezolanas (1997), Vueltas a la patria (1997), Los oficios de la luz (1998), El recuerdo de Venecia y otros ensayos (1999), El coro de las voces solitarias, una historia de la poesía venezolana (2002) and ¿Que es la globalizacion? (2002). Weekly writer at Venezuelan daily El Nacional since 1983.

During the 1990s, Arráiz Lucca was director of the National Council of Culture and president of the state-owned publishing Monte Ávila Editores Latinoamericana.

Being a prolific poet and essayist, he took part in the Calicanto workshop ran by fellow writer Antonia Palacios. This experience led to an urban proposal that took shape in the form of a speech which focused on the 80s.

== See also ==
- Venezuela
- Venezuelan literature
- List of Venezuelan writers
