= Stefania Mosca =

Stefania Mosca (1957–2009) was a Venezuelan writer. Born in Caracas, she served as president of the Ayacucho Library Foundation (Spanish: Fundación Biblioteca Ayacucho).

== Works published ==
- Jorge Luis Borges: Utopia and Reality (1984)
- Memory and Forgetting (1986)
- Everyday people (1990)
- The Last Supper (1991)
- Banal (1993)
- My little world (1996)
- Booklet No. 69 (2001)
- Motherhood (2004)
- The ordeal of the times
- Ferdinand The Circus (2006)
