= Juan Carlos Méndez Guédez =

Venezuelan writer (born 1967)

Juan Carlos Mendez Guédez
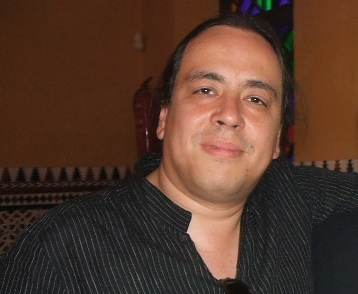
- Juan Carlos Méndez Guédez in Seville, Spain
- Born: March 2, 1967 (age 59); Barquisimeto, Lara, Venezuela
- Education: University of Salamanca

Juan Carlos Méndez Guédez (born March 2, 1967) is a Venezuelan writer and Novelty.

== Early life and education ==
Guédez was born in Barquisimeto, Venezuela, but grew up with his parent in Los Jardines del Valle, Caracas. He earned a Bachelor of Arts degree in Literature from the Central University of Venezuela with a thesis on poetry groups "Traffic" and "Guaire". Later, he earned a Ph.D in Hispanic American Literature from the University of Salamanca with a thesis on the Venezuelan writer José Balza.

He published fifteen books including; novels, short stories and essays. He lived in Spain where he published most of his works including; Líneas aéreas and Pequeñas resistencias. In Venezuela, his texts are part of two recent short story anthologies: Las voces secretas, published by Alfaguara, and 21 del XXI, that was commercially released by Ediciones B.

== Awards ==
In April 2013 his novel Arena Negra was awarded Book of the Year by booksellers in Venezuela.

== Published works ==
Some of his published books include; ‘Árbol de luna’ (2000), Una tarde con campanas (2004), ‘Los maletines’ (2014), and El libro de Esther 1999; Tal vez la Lluvia 2009; Los Maletines 2014 and ‘La ola detenida’ (2018), ‘El baile de madame Kalalú’ (2016), and ‘Roman de la isla Bararida’ (2024).

== Work ==
Méndez Guédez's work has been placed by many literary scholars — such as Chiara Bolognese (Autonomous University of Madrid), Fabiola Fernandez (Andrés Bello Catholic University), Vega Sánchez (University of Salamanca), or Maartje Vranken (Katholieke Universiteit Leuven) — in the orbit of the Spanish-American romantic and sentimental narrative. A line of writing that comes from authors like Manuel Puig or Alfredo Bryce Echenique, in which the humor, relationships with popular culture, and the emphasis on the emotional dramas of male characterized by their fragility, define the general discourse of its narrative. But, as the writer Ignacio Sanz argues, in Méndez Guédez one sees a sense of dual belonging, on one side to the Peninsular Spanish cultural register and, on the other, to the Hispanic American worldview, which is evident in the construction of his prose style, full of winks and lexical features that constitute a sort of mestizo language in itself.

Méndez Guédez is known for his 21st-century Spanish language fiction that also involves authors such as Fernando Iwasaki, Jorge Eduardo Benavides, Juan Gabriel Vasquez, Andrés Neuman, etc.; writers whose fictions embodies a look at the place of origin, combined with a critical outlook of the place of residence.

As stated by critic Marco Kunz (University of Lausanne): "The migrant narrative of Méndez Guédez demonstrates the possibility of a new Latin American literature that is not enclosed in the obliguismo that explores the hallmarks of local, regional or national, nor chooses a staunch internationalism ".

Notably, Méndez Guédez is one of the authors who started fictionalizing the immigration of 21st-century Spain with his novel Una tarde con campanas, published in 2004. A topic that has been followed up by authors such as Joseph Shepherd, Carmen Jiménez, Pablo Aranda, Donato Ndongo, Najat El Hachmi, James Roncagliolo and Angels Case, among others.

In a way, his books incorporate into its narrative a sense of both the spatial and cultural diversity that is characteristic of his country, together with that of the Iberian Peninsula and the Canary Islands, as to conform a larger and richer fictional universe. This element, according to German critic Burkhard Pohl, constitutes a feature of a certain segment of the current Latin American narrative, in which the style of authors such as Méndez Guédez and Jorge Volpi serve as a parody of the exchange between different realities, highlighting the absurd literary notion that attached preconceived worldviews to certain writers from different regions of the planet.

Méndez Guédez is considered by many a renovator of the romantic tradition in Latin American narrative. Some of Méndez Guédez's works also have stylistic features that go back to the English comic novel — such as certain strain of vulgar eroticism — but that nonetheless remain within the influence of more contemporary and experimental trends in story construction — all that is without forgetting the passion for the power of anecdote and the seduction of the reader, and exploring expressive tools that break with classical linearity. Thus, each of Méndez Guédez texts can be a literary universe in itself; one that answers common themes but that is also able to expose a diverse scriptural development.

== Bibliography ==
- La diosa del agua: Cuentos y mitos del Amazonas (Páginas de espuma, Madrid, 2020)
- La ola detenida (Harper Collins, Madrid 2017)
- El baile de madame Kalalú (Siruela, Madrid, 2016)
- Los maletines (Siruela, Madrid 2014)
- Arena negra (Lugar Común, Caracas, 2012, Casadcartón, Madrid, 2013, Casadcartón, Lima 2013)
- Ideogramas (Páginas de espuma, Madrid, 2012)
- Chulapos Mambo (Casadcartón, Madrid, 2011; Lugar Común, Caracas, 2012)
- Tal vez la lluvia (DVD, Barcelona, 2009; Ebook: https://web.archive.org/web/20070716063515/http://www.leer-e.es/
- La bicicleta de Bruno (Ediciones B, Caracas, 2009)
- Hasta luego, Míster Salinger (Páginas de espuma, Madrid, 2007)
- El barco en que viajas (UNEY, San Felipe, 2007)
- Nueve mil kilómetros y tu abrazo (Ediciones B, Bogotá, 2006)
- Una tarde con campanas (Alianza, Madrid, 2004; Equinoccio, Caracas, 2012)
- Tan nítido en el recuerdo (Lengua de trapo, Madrid, 2001)
- Árbol de luna (Lengua de trapo, Madrid, 2000)
- La ciudad de arena (Calembé, Cádiz, 2000)
- Palabras de agosto (Mucuglifo, Mérida, Venezuela, 1999)
- El libro de Esther (Lengua de trapo, Madrid, 1999; Lugar común, Caracas, 2011); Ebook: https://web.archive.org/web/20070716063515/http://www.leer-e.es/
- Retrato de Abel con isla volcánica al fondo (Troya, Caracas, 1997); Ebook: http://www.musaalas9.com
- La Resurrección de Scheerezade (Solar, Mérida, Venezuela, 1994)
- Historias del edificio (Guaraira Repano, Caracas, 1994)

IN FRENCH:

- Mambo canaille (Zinnia Éditions, Lyon, 2014) French translation by Nicole Rochaix-Salmona
- La pluie peut-être (Orbis Tertius, Dijon, 2014) French translation by Adelaide De Chatellus
- La ville de Sable (Albatros, Geneve, 2011) French translation by Adelaide De Chatellus

== Anthologies and other publications ==
- Crude Words: Contemporary Writing from Venezuela. Compiled by Tim Girven, Montague Kobbe and Katie Brown (Ragpicker Press, 2016)
- La heteronimia poética y sus variaciones transatlánticas. Compiled by Mario Barrero Fajardo. (Universidad de los Andes, Bogotá, 2013)
- Novísima relación. Narrativa amerispánica actual. Edited and collected by Daniel Mesa Gancedo. (Institución Fernando el Católico, Zaragoza, 2012)
- Náufragos en San Borondón (Baile del sol, Tenerife, 2012)
- Los oficios del libro. Foreword by Juan Villoro. (Libros de la Ballena, Madrid, 2011)
- Les bonnes nouvelles de l´amerique latine. Foreword by Mario Vargas Llosa. Selection by Fernando Iwasaki and Gustavo Guerrero (Gallimard, París, 2010)
- La Vasta Brevedad. Selection by Antonio López Ortega, Carlos Pacheco and Miguel Gomes (Alfaguara, Caracas, 2010)
- Narrativa latinoamericana para el siglo XXI: nuevos enfoques y territorios. Edited by Ángel Esteban; Jesús Montoya, Francisca Noguerol and María Ángeles Pérez López (OLMS, Hildesheim, 2010)
- "Les pruniers fleurissent en mars" in Rue Saint Ambroise, #24 (París, 2009)
- Atmósferas. (Asociación cultural Mucho Cuento, Córdoba, 2009)
- El lugar donde ocurren las historias. Conferencia. Preliminary study by Chiara Bolognese (Centre de Recherches Latino-Americaines, Poitiers, 2009)
- '"El cuento hispanoamericano contemporáneo; Vivir del cuento" in Rilma 2, ADEHL, México /París, 2009)
- Zgodbe Iz Venezuele (Sodobnost Internacional, Ljubljana, 2009)
- "Cinquième étage à droite" in Rue Saint Ambroise, #21 (París, 2008)
- 21 del XXI. Antólogo: Rubi Guerra (Ediciones B, Caracas, 2007)
- Inmenso estrecho (Kailas, Madrid, 2007)
- "Histoire d´amour à Santiago de León Caracas ou la minijupe couleur miel" in La nouvelle Revue Française, #581 (París, Gallimard, 2007)
- Que me cuentas (antología de cuentos y gúia de lectura para jóvenes, padres y profesores). Edited by Amalia Vilches (Páginas de espuma, Madrid, 2006)
- "Nueva cuentística venezolana: breve inmersión" in Hispamérica, #97 (Maryland, University of Maryland, 2004)
- Pequeñas resistencias. Selección de Andrés Neuman (Páginas de espuma, Madrid, 2002)
- Líneas aéreas (Lengua de trapo, Madrid, 1999)
- Un paseo por la narrativa venezolana (Resma, Santa Cruz de Tenerife, 1998)
- Narrativa venezolana Attuale (Bulzoni Editore, Roma, 1995)
