= Graciela Rincón Calcaño =

Venezuelan writer and poet

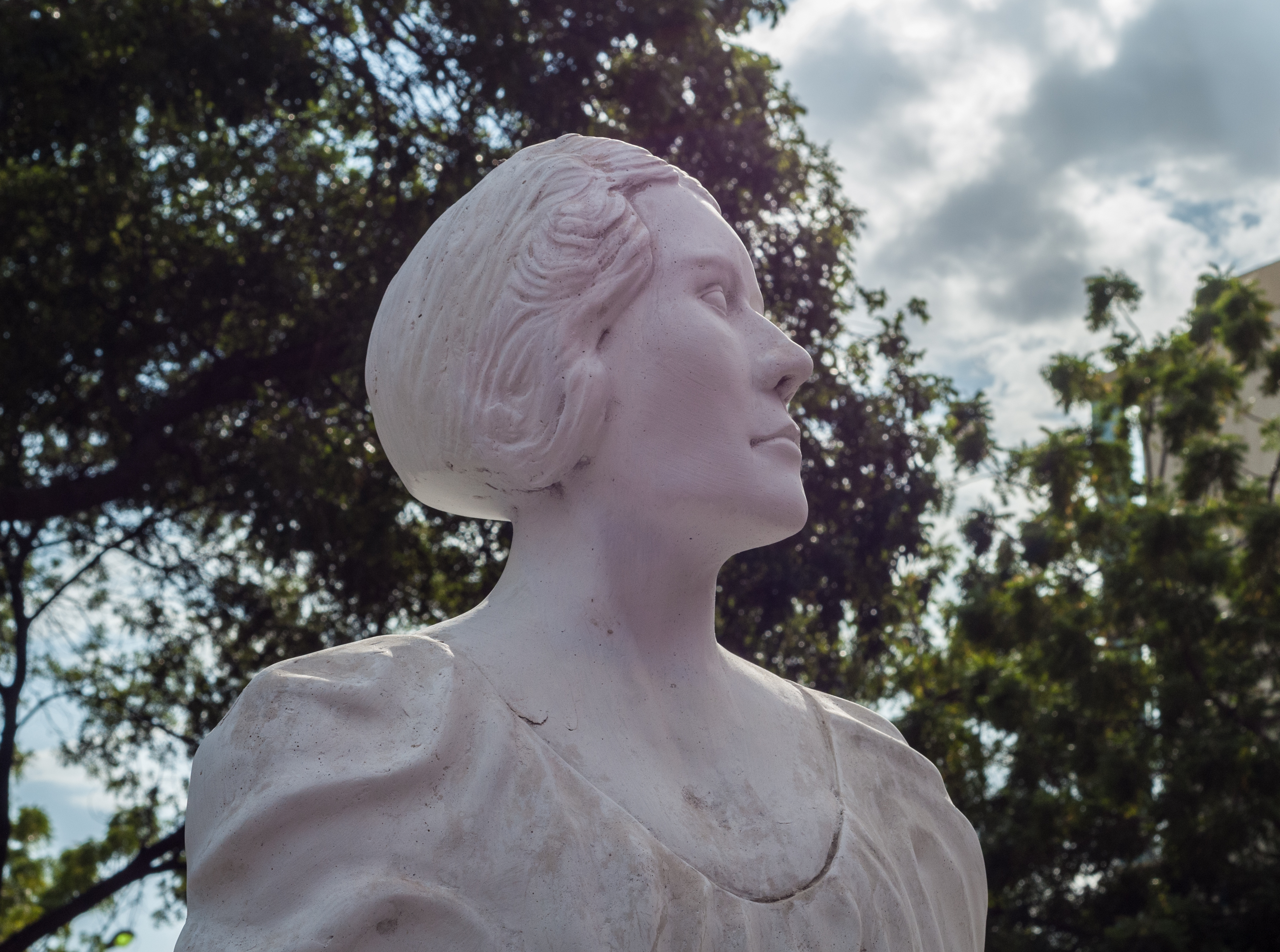
Busto de Graciela Rincón Calcaño

Graciela Rincón Calcaño (pen name, Egle Mediavilla; Maracaibo 1904 – Caracas, 21 January 1987) was a Venezuelan writer and poet.
