= Manuel Vicente Romerogarcía =

Venezuelan writer (1861–1917)

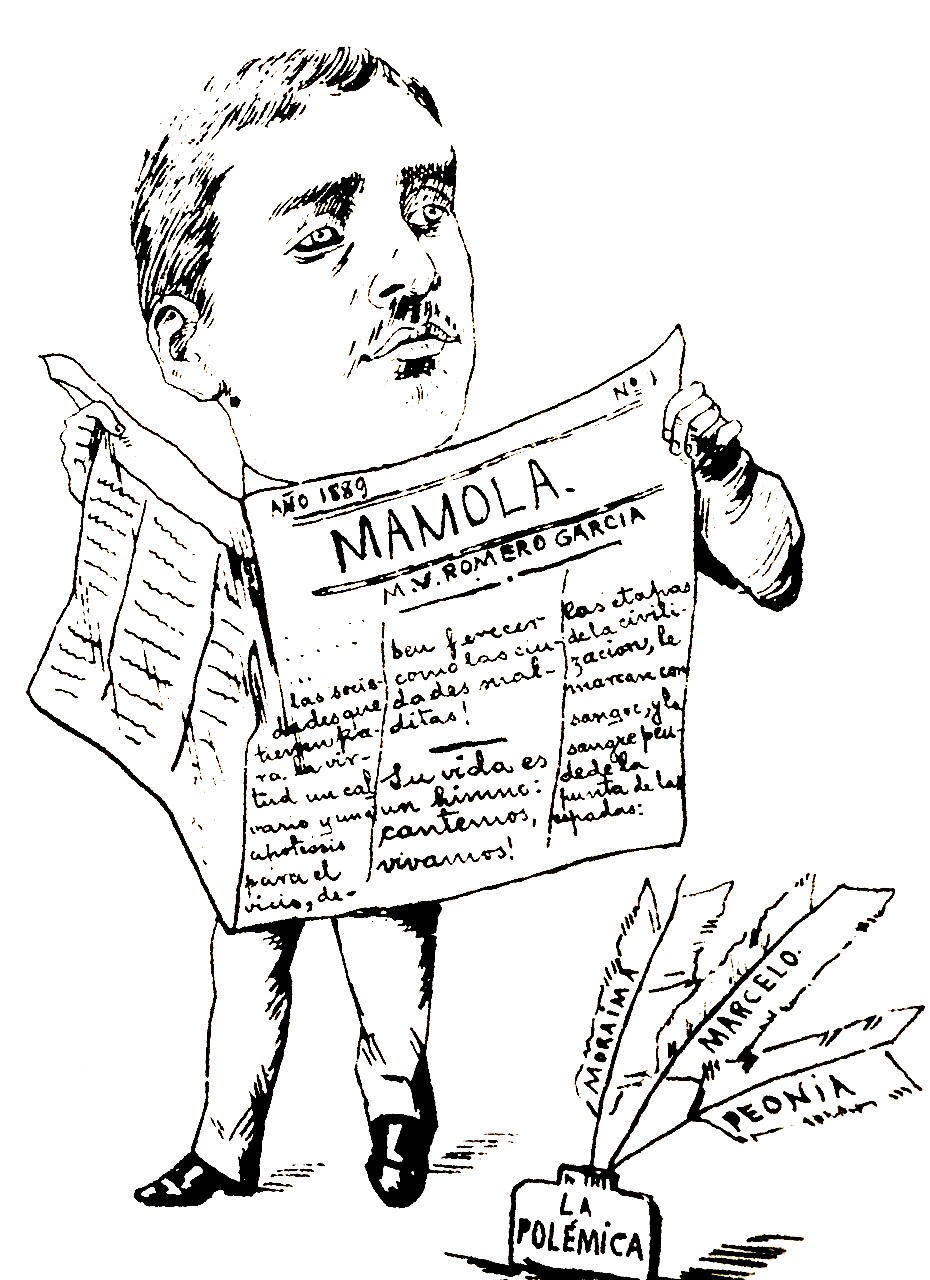
Caricature of the writer and politician Manuel Vicente Romero García (1861-1917), part of the archive of the National Library of Venezuela.

Manuel Vicente Romerogarcía or Manuel Vicente Romero García (Venezuela, 1861 - Aracataca, Colombia, August 22, 1917), was a Venezuelan writer, soldier, telegrapher and politician best known for his first and only novel Peonía (1890). It blended realist and Romantic styles with elements of criollismo and is credited by many critics with giving birth to the Venezuelan novel. In 1896, he was running the newspaper El Avisador Comercial.

As a young man, he was an opponent of the administration of Guzmán Blanco. He was arrested fourteen times in five years. Thereafter he became a military officer, serving during administrations of Raimundo Andueza Palacio, Ignacio Andrade, and Cipriano Castro. In his military service he quelled an 1889 mutiny at the San Carlos Barracks, was tortured by the government, and joined the Liberating Revolution. After this failed, he went into exile before returning. He circulated a leaflet against the governor of Carabobo and was exiled again.
