= Boris Izaguirre =

Venezuelan writer, TV host, screenwriter, journalist and showman

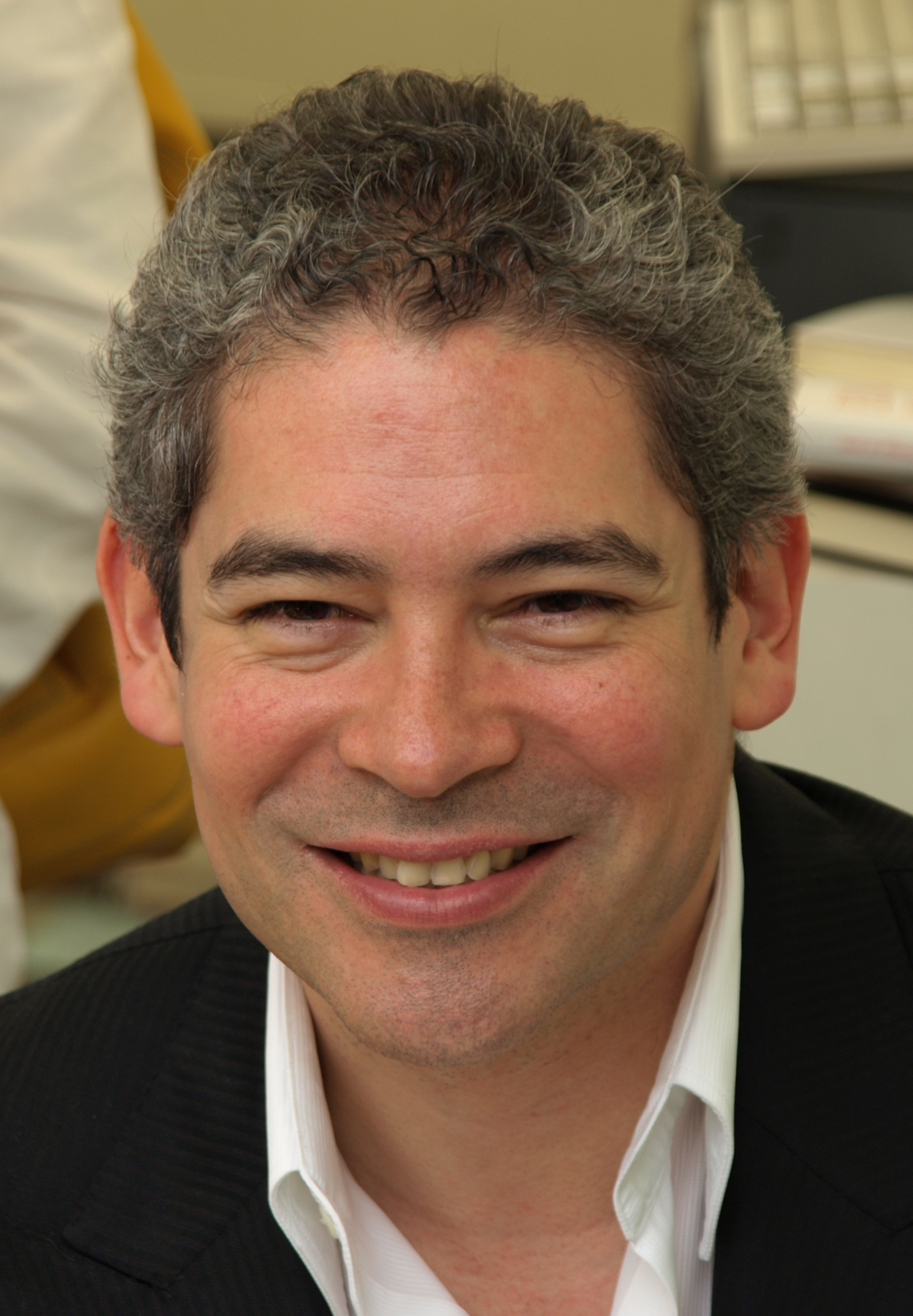
- Born: Boris Rodolfo Izaguirre Lobo; 29 September 1965 (age 60); Caracas, Venezuela
- Spouse: Rubén Nogueira (m. 2006)

Boris Rodolfo Izaguirre Lobo (born 29 September 1965) is a Venezuelan writer, TV host, screenwriter, journalist and showman.

== Career ==
Izaguirre wrote the scripts of some of the Venezuelan telenovelas: Ruby and La dama de rosa. After their success in Spain, he moved to Santiago de Compostela in Galicia, Spain.

In Spain, Izaguirre started to write scripts and appear on television shows. He became a prominent showman, especially after his participation in the late night television show Crónicas Marcianas.

Izaguirre has written articles for several publications, including Zero, El País Semanal, Fotogramas and Marie Claire. He was the host of the daily talk show Channel Nº4 alongside Ana García-Siñeriz on Cuatro from 2005 to 2008, when the program was cancelled. He also hosted the Miss Venezuela pageant in 2009, 2010, 2012, and 2013.

In February 2006, Izaguirre married his longtime boyfriend Rubén Nogueira.

He was finalist of the Premio Planeta in 2007 with his novel Villa Diamante.

Since 2015 Izaguirre is in the panel of TV show Suelta la Sopa on Telemundo (Miami, Florida) with descriptive segments that reveal the best kept secrets of favorite soap opera stars narrated in a docudrama style.

In 2018, Izaguirre participated in the reality television cooking show MasterChef Celebrity.

In 2019, Izaguirre hosted the talent show competition series Prodigios, on La 1 the premium channel of Televisión Española.

== Books ==
- El vuelo de los avestruces (1991) novel
- Azul petróleo (1998) novel
- Morir de glamour (2000) essay
- Verdades alteradas (2001) essay
- 1965 (2002) novel
- Fetiche (2003) essay
- Villa Diamante (2007) novel
- Y de repente fue ayer (2009) novel
- Dos monstruos juntos (2011) novel
- Un jardín al norte (2014) novel
- Tiempo de tormenta (2018) novel
