= María Calcaño =

Venezuelan poet (1906–1956)

María José Francisca del Carmen Calcaño Ortega
- Born: December 12, 1906; Maracaibo
- Died: 1956 (aged 49–50); Maracaibo
- Occupation: Venezuelan poet

María Calcaño (Maracaibo, 1906 – Caracas, 1956) was a Venezuelan poet.

She was married at 14, and had six children before the age of 27. Her success as a poet was belated, and she preferred to talk about a subversive eroticism in her poems instead of aesthetic patterns or social topics, which were the main subjects of her contemporaries.

== Biography ==
At the age of 14, she was married off by her parents. From her first marriage with Juan Roncajolo, she had six children. Later, she married writer Héctor Araujo Ortega and raised one of his nephews.

Despite living in a provincial setting and adhering to the customs of her time, she pursued poetry writing. Recognition came late, and her work became known in her country through the efforts of Cósimo Mandrillo in the 1980s when he published an anthology of her work. The theme of her poetry is marked by eroticism. Eros is expressed in her poems in a straightforward and direct manner, marked by desire. Her poems were subversive for her time, challenging the morality of the era. She is considered the first Venezuelan poet to embrace modernity through freedom and the enjoyment of expression.

Although she did not belong to any literary group, she met members of the Seremos group, among whom she encountered her second husband.

Her first poetry collection, titled Alas fatales (1935), was poorly received by society, and it was also considered immoral. Twenty-one years later, she would publish her second book, Canciones que oyeron mis últimas muñecas (1956), the same year of her death.

Several anthologies that compile her work include María Calcaño: Antología Poética (EdiLUZ, Maracaibo, 1984), María Calcaño Obras completas published by the Sociedad Dramática de Maracaibo in 1996, María Calcaño Obras completas by Arcevo Histórico del Estado Zulia in 1997, and Obra poética completa María Calcaño by Monte Ávila Editores in 2008.

Her poems have been included in various anthologies of Venezuelan poetry, such as: Donde la boca que te busca (Antología femenina), concept and coordination by Julio Jiménez. Fundación Editorial El perro y la rana, Guarenas, 2011. Antología de la poesía venezolana, anthologist Rafael Arráiz Lucca. Editorial Panapo. Caracas, 1997. Del dulce mal. Poesía Amorosa de Venezuela. Harry Almela (Anthologist). Editorial Aguilar. Caracas, 2008. Cuerpos desnudos, hechos ardientes. Poesía erótica venezolana. Néstor Leal (Anthologist). Editorial: Grijalbo. Caracas: 1996. Among many others.

Published Books: Alas fatales (1935), Canciones que oyeron mis últimas muñecas (1956), and Entre la luna y los hombres (1961), which was published posthumously. Two of her unpublished works, La hermética maravillada and Poesía, are included in the anthology Obra poética completa by Monte Ávila Editores. The latter belongs to the Altazor collection and was published in 2008.

== Books ==
- Alas fatales (1935)
- Canciones que oyeron mis últimas muñecas (1956)
- Entre la luna y los hombres (1961), posthumous.
