= Óscar Yanes =

Venezuelan journalist (1927–2013)

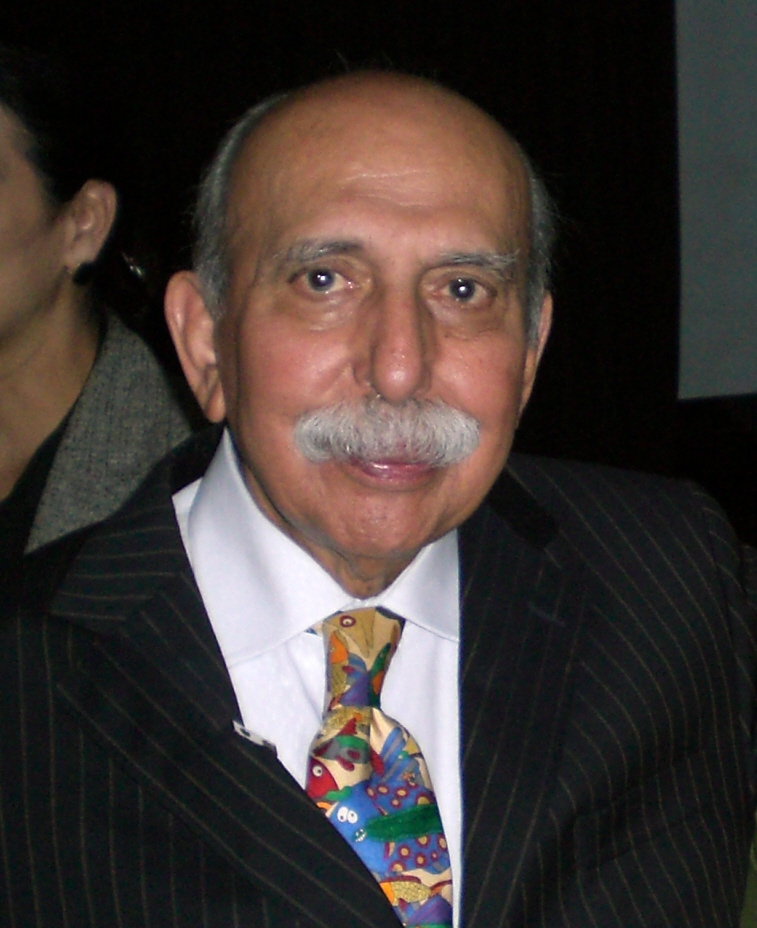
- Óscar Yanes in 2008
- Born: 25 April 1927; Caracas, Venezuela
- Died: 21 October 2013 (aged 86); Caracas, Venezuela
- Occupations: Journalist, writer, politician

Signature
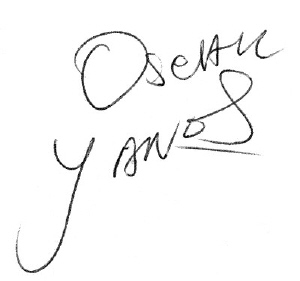

Óscar Armando Yanes González (25 April 1927 – 21 October 2013) was a Venezuelan journalist, politician and bestselling author, considered a pioneer in Venezuelan broadcast journalism. He was awarded three times with the National Prize for Journalism.

== Biography ==
As a child he attended the Zamora School. The idol of where he lived, at that time, was a boxer named Armando Best. Pompeyo Márquez and Eloy Torres also studied at that school. Later on, Yanes went to the University and studied as a journalist, after seeing a notice from the newspaper. He entered the first school of journalism that existed in Venezuela, at the Free University "Augusteo", founded in October 1941 by Monsignor Rafael Lovera, at the time of the General Isaías Medina Angarita. Press freedom given by General Medina Angarita allowed the circulation of 3 newspapers that made history: Últimas Noticias, El Nacional and El Morrocoy Blue. Yanes signed up for the founding squad of Últimas Noticias and stayed there for a few years.

At age 25 he assumes the direction of the newspaper La Esfera. Ramón David León, who gave him the chance at 13 years of getting to know the world of journalism, gives him his office and his position 12 years later, when he decides to sell the newspaper and buys it Miguel Ángel Capriles.

In the late 1940s, he received the first prize from the Venezuelan Association of Writers for his book Carlos J. Bello, el Sabio Olvidado (Carlos J. Bello, the forgotten wise man).

Leading the team of Venevisión a Venezuelan network, Yanes was sent in 1966 to Vietnam as a war correspondent and press officer. For two months he made six reports that were distributed throughout Latin America: “La guerra en la mar” (The War on the Sea) , “La guerra en el aire” (The War in the Air), “La guerra en la selva” (The War in the Jungle), "The Vietcong", “La religión” (The religion) and “La mujer vietnamita” (The Vietnamese woman).

He stood out as professor of the first class of the School of Social Communication of the Central University of Venezuela and dictated a class in the Andrés Bello Catholic University of Caracas.

Yanes, aside from his journalistic career, ventured into politics as a representative of the COPEI party. From January 23rd, 1974 until January 23rd, 1989, he served three times as Congressman of the Republic for the Federal District, as well as director of the Central Office of Information (now the Ministry of Popular Power for Communication and Information).

He won on three occasions the National Prize for Journalism, the Monseñor Pellín Prize and the First Prize of the Association of Writers of Venezuela in the contest of biographies of famous Venezuelans, for his work entitled "Carlos J. Bello, the Forgotten Sage". He also won the Silver Book Award in 1992, awarded by Editorial Planeta for the book with the highest circulation of the year.

Considered one of the pioneers in Realtime TV journalism, with particular interviews confronting many in front of the cameras, he became famous for his rhetoric and historic ways in television programs.

Yanes was famous for his tales about contemporary history in the TV program Así son las Cosas (The way things are). In 1992 won the Silver Book Prize awarded by Planeta Publishing, for the largest book circulation of the year.

He passed away on 21 October 2013 in Caracas, due to complications with prostate cancer.

== Published works ==
- Carlos J. Bello, el Sabio Olvidado (1946)
- Vida íntima de Leo (1948)
- Cosas de Caracas (1967) Editorial Planeta.
- Cosas del mundo (1972)
- Por qué yo maté a Delgado Chalbaud, las Confesiones de Pedro Antonio Díaz (1980)
- Amores del última Página (1991) Editorial Planeta.
- Memorias de Armandito (1992) Editorial Planeta.
- Los años inolvidables (1992) Editorial Planeta.
- Del Trocadero al Pasapoga (1993) Editorial Planeta.
- Hoy es mañana o las vainas de un reportero muerto (1994) Editorial Planeta.
- Así Son las Cosas collection (1996–1999) Editorial Planeta.
- ¿Qué opina UD. de la mujer que le quita el marido a otra? (1997)
- Pura Pantalla (2000) Editorial Planeta.
- Ternera y Puerta Franca (2003) Editorial Planeta.
- Nadie me quita lo Bailao (2007) Editorial Planeta.
- Nadie me quita lo Bailao II (2009) Editorial Planeta.
- Así Son las Cosas. Edición Limitada (2010) Editorial Planeta.
- La verdad sobre el asesinato de Delgado Chalbaud (2011) Editorial Planeta.

== Television programs ==
- Así son las Cosas (Premio Monseñor Pellín 1997).
- La Silla Caliente (1998).
- La Mañana Caliente (1999).
- Óscar Yanes en la Guataca (2000).
- Lo que Usted No Sabe (2006).

== See also ==
- Venezuelan literature
