= Teresa de la Parra =

Venezuelan novelist

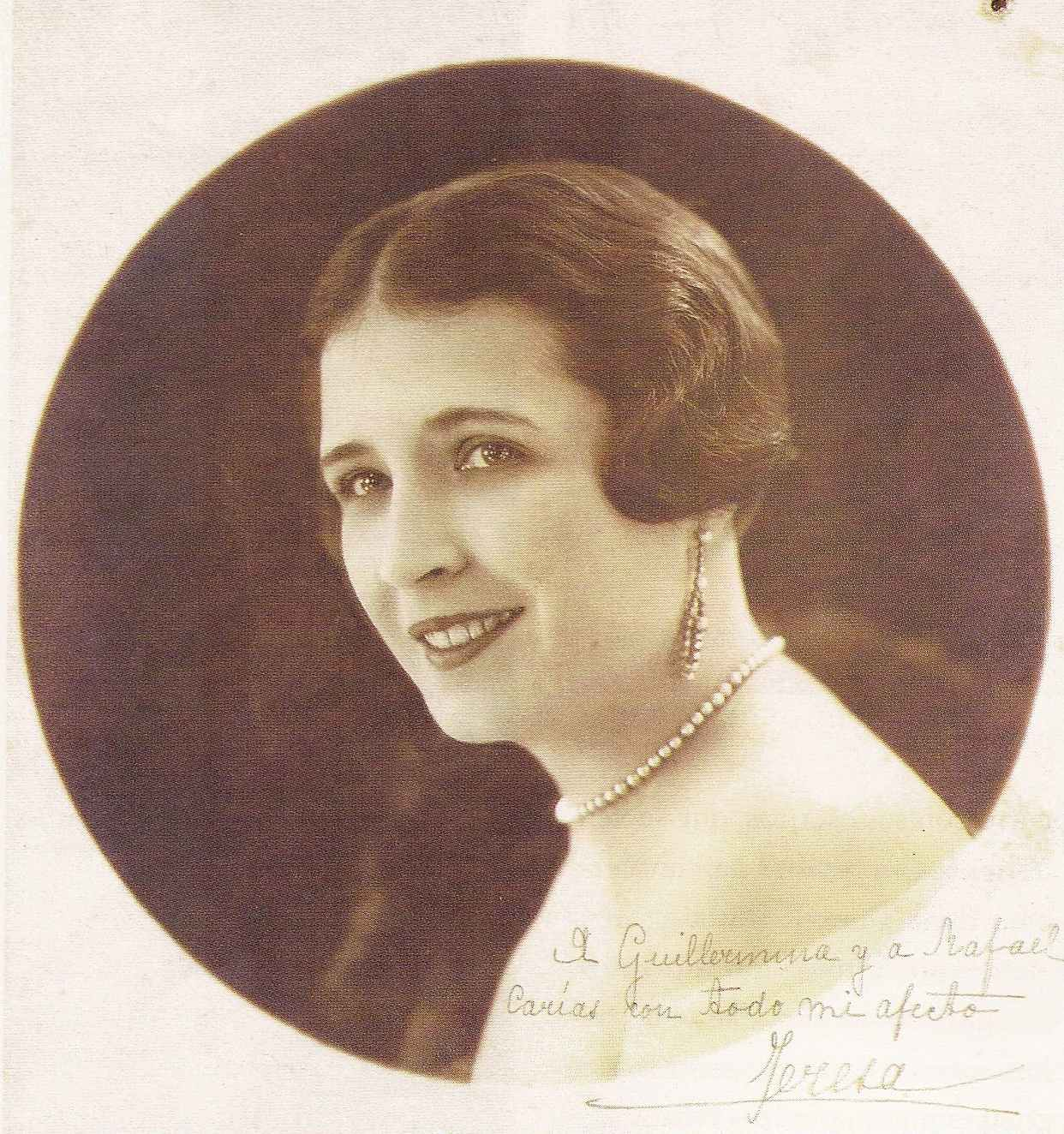
- Born: October 5, 1889; Paris, France
- Died: April 23, 1936 (aged 46); Madrid, Spain
- Occupation: Novelist
- Writing career
- Period: 1920–1936
- Notable works: Ifigenia, Memorias de Mamá Blanca

Ana Teresa Parra Sanojo (October 5, 1889 – April 23, 1936), known by her pseudonym Teresa de la Parra, was a Venezuelan novelist. She is considered one of the most relevant writers of her time, particularly for her works on feminist ideology.

== Life ==
She was born Ana Teresa Parra Sanojo in Paris, the daughter of Rafael Parra Hernáiz, Venezuelan Ambassador in Berlin, and Isabel Sanojo de Parra.

As a member of a wealthy family, Ana Teresa spent part of her childhood at her father's hacienda Tazón. After the death of her father, Ana Teresa and her sisters were taken by their mother to study at the Sacred Heart School, in Godella, Spain. Under fervent religious precepts, they received a solid education, suitable for upper-class young ladies. Ana Teresa returned to Caracas at the age of 19.

After she settled in Paris, de la Parra travelled and had an intense social life. She began to research a biography of Simón Bolívar, perhaps inspired by the centenary of his death. However, her idea was interrupted when she was diagnosed with tuberculosis. She wandered in several European sanatoriums, mainly in Switzerland and Spain, but did not find a cure. It was then that she met Cuban poet and anthropologist Lydia Cabrera who would play an important role in de la Parra's life during her last years. She reflected about her philosophical and literary ideas, and studied her own work and life evolution through the years.

De la Parra died in Madrid. Her remains were exhumed and brought to Caracas in 1947. In 1989, the 100th anniversary of her birth, she was reburied with honors at the National Pantheon in Caracas.

== Works ==
She rebelled against the limited expectations for women of her class by long hours of reading and writing. Her fantastic stories were published in the newspaper El Universal, and her Diary of a Caraqueña in the Far East was published in the magazine Actualidades. De la Parra's story Mama X earned first prize in a contest held in a provincial Venezuelan city. This story, as well as her Diary of a young lady who writes because she is bored (which was published in the magazine La Lectura Semanal) was the beginning of her first major work.

=== Iphigenia ===
De la Parra's novel Iphigenia: Diary of a young lady who wrote because she was bored, published in 1924, marked a change in Venezuelan literature. She wrote most of the novel in 1921 and 1922 during the dictatorship of Juan Vicente Gómez. Some of the characters in the novel were maliciously close to caricatures of people who were then well known in Caracas society. The characters Abuelita, Tía Clara and César Leal represent strict adherence to morality. Ambitious and politically corrupt characters like Gabriel Olmedo and Tío Pancho also reflect moral freedom given to men, in contrast against the passive role assigned to women.

The protagonist of Iphigenia, María Eugenia Alonso, a well-educated and intelligent young woman, is partly a self-portrait of the author. María Eugenia struggles against being confined in a marriage that threatens to stifle her intellectual development. She strives to determine whether it is possible for an intelligent and educated woman to evade marriage without losing her respectability in a society where women are expected to become wives and mothers. She also feels trapped in a city that, for her, is parochial and claustrophobic.

The tone, thematic nature and social-historic context of Iphigenia made it controversial among some social and literary circles in Venezuela and Colombia. Juan Vicente Gómez's government would not give Venezuelan publishers money to publish Iphigenia. De la Parra travelled to Paris, where she had friends such as Simón Barceló, Alberto Zérega Fombona, Ventura García Calderón and Gonzalo Zaldumbide.

Winner of the annual award given by Casa Editora Franco-Ibero-Americana in Paris in 1924, de la Parra finally had her work published and received a prize of 10,000 French francs. Iphigenia became a categorical success among Parisian intellectuals and readers. It was soon translated into French. Two years after multiple trips and works — which included lectures in Nations Society and exquisite answers to critics — the writer began her second major work.

=== Mama Blanca's Memoirs ===
Memorias de Mamá Blanca ("Mama Blanca's Memoirs"), published in 1929, was a nostalgia-filled fictionalized memoir of De la Parra's childhood. The spirit of the four sisters living on the hacienda Tazón is reflected in the six sisters living on the hacienda Piedra Azul. The moral "correctness" of Souvenirs of Mama Blanca received favorable attention from those who had criticized Iphigenia. In her letters, de la Parra wrote that there was no Iphigenia scent in Souvenirs of Mama Blanca, which had no protest speech, revolutionary ideas or social criticism.

De la Parra became a sought-after lecturer. Her more important speeches took place in Havana and Bogotá; this last one was very meaningful about her personal ideas of women's roles in American society from colonial times to the 20th century.

== Bibliography ==
- de la Parra, Teresa (1993). Iphigenia. Austin: University of Texas Press. ISBN 0-292-71571-4.
- de la Parra, Teresa (1988). Las Memorias De Mamá Blanca (in Spanish). Coleccion Archivos. ISBN 84-89666-08-3.
- Jarman, Rebecca (2023), Representing the Barrios: Culture, Politics, and Urban Poverty in Twentieth-Century Caracas. Pittsburgh: University of Pittsburgh Press. ISBN 9780822947653
