= Hensli Rahn Solórzano =

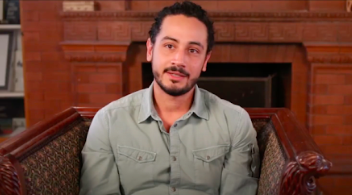
Hensli Rahn.

Hensli Rahn Solórzano (born 30 March 1982) is a Venezuelan writer. He has been living in Germany since 2015.

== Early life and education ==
Rahn Solórzano was born in Caracas and holds a BA degree in literature from the Central University of Venezuela.

== Career ==
He has published two narrative books: Dinero fácil, chosen by the newspaper El Universal as the best Venezuelan book of short stories of 2014, and Crónicamente Caracas, which won a special mention in the VI Edition of the Annual Transgeneric Award of the Foundation for Urban Culture. His short stories have won several awards in Venezuela.

In 2016 he was writer-in-residence at the International Writing Program at the University of Iowa, USA.

In 2024 he was a guest writer at the third edition of "Leap Off Page", a festival for literature and contemporary dance sponsored by the Elizabeth Kostova Foundation, in Bulgaria.

His texts appear in anthologies published in Argentina, Uruguay and Venezuela. Among other media, he has collaborated with Zeit Online, Trópico Absoluto, Papel Literario and Prodavinci. Selections of his work have been translated into English, German and Bulgarian.

Rahn Solórzano is part of the so-called Venezuelan literature in exile or diaspora literature, along with writers such as Karina Sainz Borgo, Rodrigo Blanco Calderón, Keila Vall de la Ville, Michelle Roche Rodríguez or Gustavo Valle.

== Music ==
Rahn Solórzano is a nephew of the late Venezuelan orchestra conductor Eduardo Rahn.

From an early age he wrote songs and played guitar in several rock ensembles. In 2005 he formed the group Autopista Sur and released the album Caracas se quema (2008).

In 2012 he completed the program Audio Engineering at SAE Institute, Barcelona. Between 2019 and 2023 he worked at Eastside Mastering Studio, Berlin.

== Selected works ==
=== Fiction ===
- Dinero fácil.Short stories. (Caracas, 2014) ISBN 9789807643023

=== Non-fiction ===
- Crónicamente Caracas (Caracas, 2008) ISBN 9789806553774

=== Anthologies ===
- Florecer lejos de casa (Berlin, 2018) ISBN 9789974844087
- 266 microdosis de Bolaño (Buenos Aires, 2024) ISBN 9786310039770
