= List of literary accounts of the Pied Piper =

This is a list of literary accounts of the Pied Piper, that is, of tellings or retellings of the full story of the Pied Piper of Hamelin. For briefer allusions to the Pied Piper, in literature and other media, see Pied Piper of Hamelin in popular culture.

== The Pied Piper in literature before 1900 ==
=== 14th century ===
- Decan Lude chorus book (c. 1384): Now lost, a choirbook owned by Decan Lude of Hamelin reportedly contained an eyewitness account of the event, written by his grandmother in Latin verse.

=== 15th century ===
- The Lueneburg manuscript (c. 1440–1450): A few lines in German appear to be the oldest surviving account.

=== 16th century ===
- Count F.C. von Zimmern, Zimmerische Chronik (c. 1559-1565): This appears to be the earliest account which mentions the plague of rats.

=== 17th century ===
- Richard Rowland Verstegan, Restitution of decayed intelligence (1605): This, the earliest English account, includes the reference to the rats and the idea that the lost children turned up in Transylvania.
- Robert Burton, The Anatomy of Melancholy (1621): The story is told in a single line as an example of supernatural forces: ‘At Hammel in Saxony, ann. 1484, 20 Junii, the devil, in likeness of a pied piper, carried away 130 children that were never after seen.’
- James Howell, Epistolae Ho-Elianae (1645) – brief mention.
- William Ramesey, Helminthologia; or Some Physical Considerations of Wormes (1668): copying Verstegen, writes of "... that most remarkable story in Verstegan, of the Pied Piper, that carried away a hundred and sixty children from the town of Hamel in Saxony, on 22 Juli, Anno Dom. 1376; a wonderful permission of God to the rage of the Devil".
- Nathaniel Wanley, Wonders of the Little World (1687); copy of Verstegan's account.

=== 19th century ===
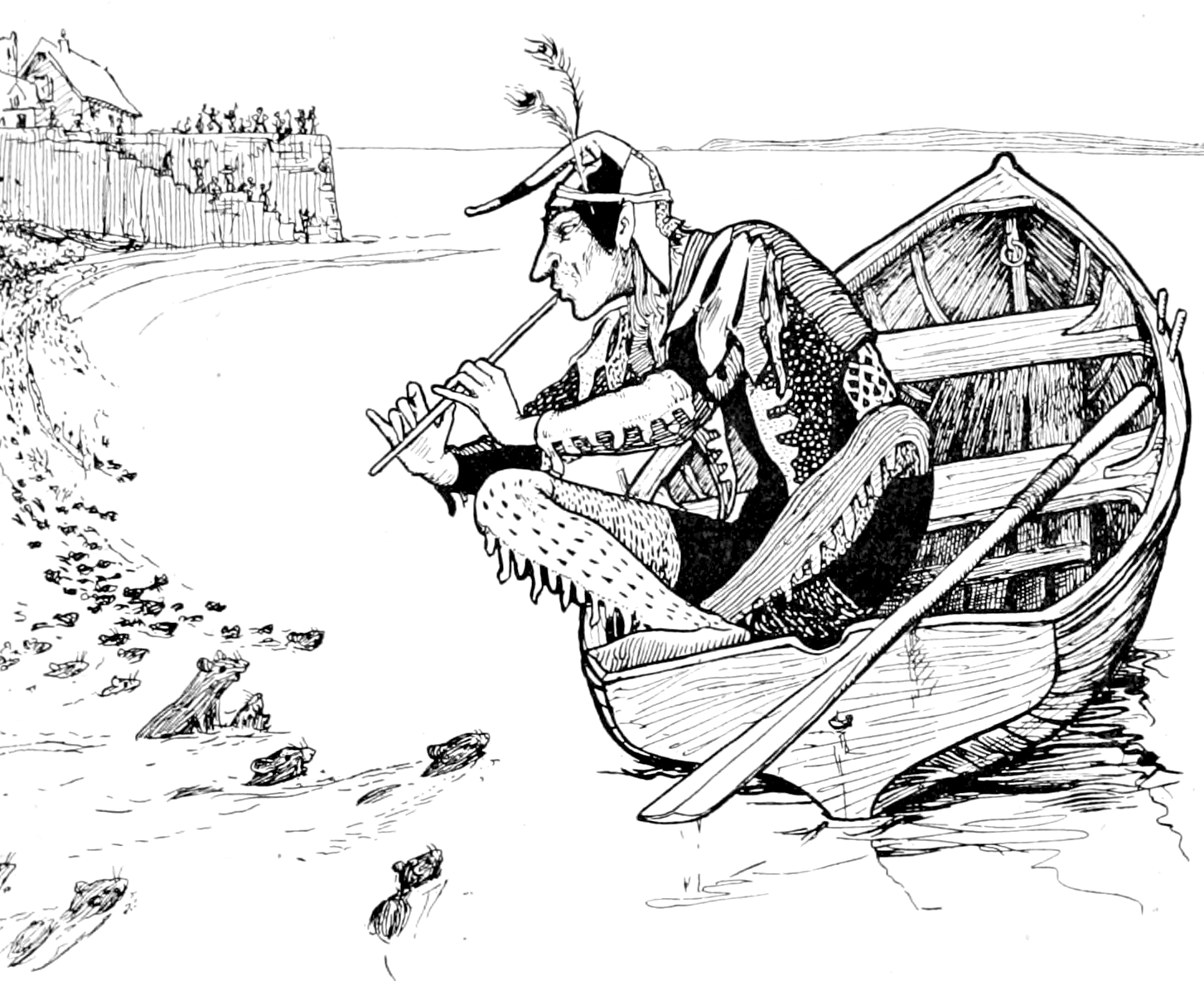
Illustration from More English Fairy Tales, by John D. Batten

- Johann Wolfgang von Goethe, poem (1803): Goethe's poem based on the story was later set to music by Hugo Wolf.
- Jakob & Wilhelm Grimm, "The Children of Hamelin", in German Legends (1816): Grimms' version draws from eleven sources. The account by the Brothers Grimm says that two children were left behind – one was blind and the other was lame – so neither could follow along with the other children. The rest became the founders of Siebenbürgen (Transylvania).
- Prosper Mérimée, in the first chapter of his historic novel A Chronicle of the Reign of Charles IX (1829) : a character narrates the legend.
- Robert Browning, "The Pied Piper of Hamelin" (1842): Using the Verstegan / Wanley version of the tale and adopting the 1376 date, Browning's verse retelling is notable for its humor, wordplay, and jingling rhymes. An 1888 edition illustrated by Kate Greenaway was published by Edmund Evans, Ltd., of London.
- Andrew Lang used the title "the Ratcatcher" for his version in The Red Fairy Book (1890).
- Joseph Jacobs compiled a number sources for inclusion in More English Fairy Tales (1894), using the title "The Pied Piper of Franchville".

== The Pied Piper in literature after 1900 ==
=== 1900-1989 ===
- Marina Tsvetaeva, The Ratcatcher (poem, 1925): loosely based on the legend.
- Eric Frank Russell, "The Rhythm of the Rats" in Weird Tales (short story, July 1950): a retelling of the Pied Piper legend as a 20th-century horror story.
- Shel Silverstein, "The One Who Stayed" in Where the Sidewalk Ends (poem, 1974): tells the story of a child who stayed behind while the rest of Hamelin's children followed the Piper's song.
- Delia Huddy, Time Piper (novel, 1976): story of a young assistant to a modern day inventor who builds a time machine and displaced the children from Hamelin in the past to the present, explaining their disappearance.
- Philip Michaels, Come, Follow Me (novel, 1983): a paperback horror novel based on the legend.
- Pickwick Productions' "The Pied Piper" on the record Four Fairy Tales and Other Children's Stories (story/song, 1968) tells a very different story from the traditional version. In this version, the Pied Piper is a wandering minstrel who plays his pipe in order to bring the children out of Hamelin just before an avalanche crashes down on the little town. The villagers are so grateful to the Pied Piper that they erect a statue in his honour containing a music box that plays his song!
- The heavy metal band Megadeth includes him in the song "Symphony of Destruction".

=== 1990s ===
- David Lee Stone, The Ratastrophe Catastrophe (1990): a parody based on the Pied Piper about a boy called Diek who takes away the children of a town because a voice in his head told him to.
- Gloria Skurzynski, What Happened in Hamelin (novel, 1993): ergotism from contaminated rye crops helps explain the mystery of what happened there.
- China Miéville, King Rat (novel, 1998): The Pied Piper story provides the basis for the central plot and several characters.
- Christopher Wallace, The Pied Piper's Poison (1998): Contrasts an army doctor in post-World War Two Germany treating plague victims with the historical truth behind the Pied Piper legend and the Thirty Years' War.

=== 2000s ===
- Bill Richardson, After Hamelin (children's book, 2000): picks up the story where Browning's poem left off. It is written in the voice of the deaf child in the poem, whom Richardson names Penelope.
- Terry Pratchett, The Amazing Maurice and His Educated Rodents (2001): a humorous take on the Pied Piper.
- Russell Brand's first children's book, Russell Brand's Trickster Tales: the Pied Piper of Hamelin (ISBN 978-1782114567), published in 2001 by Canongate Books, provided an unusual take on the traditional Pied Piper story.
- Judd Palmer, The Maestro (children's book, 2002): the second volume in Palmer's Preposterous Fables for Unusual Children; set in Hamelin 30 years after the Piper has stolen the children, a girl who arrives in the village to live with her aunt and uncle commits the sin of singing and is exiled from Hamelin, beginning a journey that leads her to find the Piper in a cave where he is a maestro to an orchestra composed of the abducted children now grown-up.
- Adam McCune and Keith McCune, The Rats of Hamelin (novel, 2005): an eighteen-year-old Pied Piper faces a hidden enemy with powers like his own.
- Jane Yolen and Adam Stemple, Pay the Piper: A Rock 'n' Roll Fairy Tale (novel, 2005): reworks the story in an Urban fantasy setting.
- Cat Weatherill, Wild Magic (children's novel, 2007): a retelling of the legend from the perspective of two of the children lured by the Piper, and the Piper himself. The book attempts to explain the Piper's motivations and paints him as a much more sympathetic character than other iterations of the story.
- Helen McCabe, Piper (novel, 2008): a horror novel based on the legend.
- Bill Willingham, Peter & Max (2009): tells the story of the Pied Piper, among other fairy tales. This book is a tie-in to his popular comic series Fables.
- Bryce Courtenay, Sylvia (2006) tells the story of the Pied Piper assisting Nicholas of Cologne to lead thousands of children on the Children’s Crusade.

=== 2010s ===
- Michael Morpurgo, The Pied Piper of Hamelin (2011) children's novel, illustrated by Emma Chichester Clark, a retelling of the story with a social agenda twist.
- John Connolly, The Rat King (short story, 2016), a macabre re-telling the story of the Pied Piper included in the 10th Anniversary edition of Connolly's novel The Book of Lost Things.

=== 2020s ===
- Cynthia Pelayo, Children of Chicago (novel, 2021), a mystery horror novel that reimagines the Pied Piper as a serial killer of children.
