= Karina Sainz Borgo =

Venezuelan journalist (born 1982)

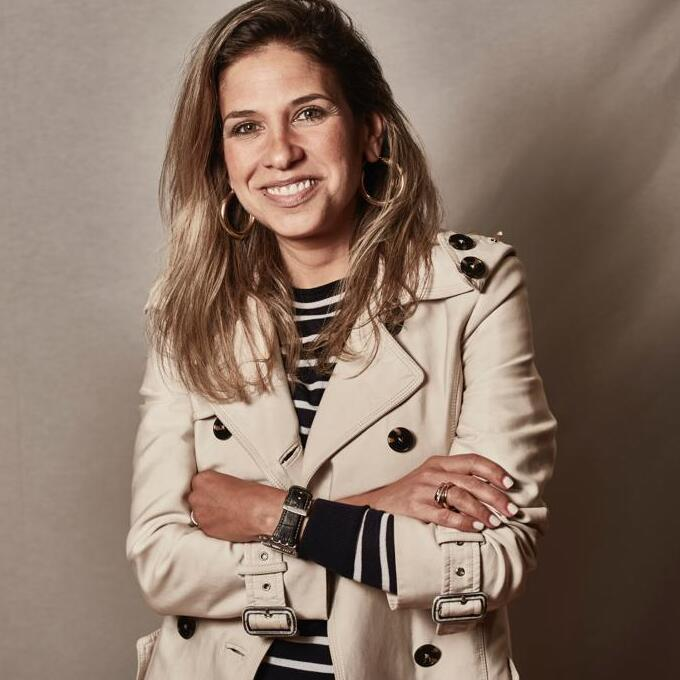
- Karina Sainz Borgo (2023)
- Born: Caracas, Venezuela
- Education: Andrés Bello Catholic University; Complutense University of Madrid; Universidad CEU San Pablo
- Occupations: journalist; non-fiction writer; novelist
- Writing career
- Genres: non-fiction; novels
- Notable works: La hija de la española; El Tercer País

Karina Sainz Borgo (born 1982, Caracas, Venezuela) is a Venezuelan journalist and writer who has lived in Spain since 2006. Her books have been translated into more than thirty languages, and her stories have been published in magazines such as Granta.

Among Sainz's most important works are It Would Be Night in Caracas, her first novel, which has been translated into more than twenty languages, and No Place to Bury the Dead, which was awarded the Jan Michalski Prize. Along with authors such as Keila Vall de la Ville, Rodrigo Blanco Calderón, Michelle Roche Rodríguez, María Elena Morán, and Camilo Pino, she is part of what critics have called the "literature of the diaspora" or "exodus".

== Early life and education ==
Karina Sainz Borgo was born in Caracas in 1982.

She was a student at the Andrés Bello Catholic University before emigrating to Spain in 2006. She continued her studies at the Complutense University of Madrid (Master's, 2007), and at the Universidad CEU San Pablo.

== Career ==
Sainz Borgo is a reporter and columnist for the Spanish newspaper ABC; she has worked for Spanish media such as Vozpópuli, Zenda, and Onda Cero. She is a cultural journalist and author of journalism books such as Caracas hip-hop (2007) and Tráfico y Guaire, el país y sus intelectuales (2007).

In 2019, she published It Would Be Night in Caracas, her first novel, which has been translated into more than twenty languages. Time magazine included this title among the 100 most important books of 2019.

In her second book, Crónicas barbitúricas, she recounts her life in Madrid. In her 2021 novel, No Place to Bury the Dead, she revisits the myth of Antigone and the fundamental right that human beings have to bury their dead. Her 2023 fantasy novel, La isla del Doctor Schubert, with illustrations by Natàlia Pàmies, was a finalist for the Grand Continent Prize in 2023.

In 2026, Sainz Borgo was awarded the prestigious Mariano de Cavia Prize for her article "Lo que más duele no es el desarraigo" (What hurts the most is not the uprooting). The jury recognized her precise prose and her profound exploration of the human condition and the experience of exile.

== Awards and honours ==
- Grand Prix L'Héroïne Madame Figaro, foreign novel category (2020)
- Nominated for the LiBeraturpreis (2020)
- Finalist for the Kulturhuset Stadsteatern Stockholm (2021)
- Longlisted, Europese Literatuurprijs (2021)
- O. Henry Prize (2021)
- Selection, Fnac Novel Prize (2023)
- David Gistau Journalism Award (2023)
- Winner, Jan Michalski Prize (2023)
- Finalist, Grand Continent Prize (2023)
- Winner, Mariano de Cavia Prize (2026)

== Selected works ==
=== Non-fiction ===
- Caracas hip-hop (Caracas, 2007)
- Tráfico y Guaire, el país y sus intelectuales (Fundación Para La Cultura Urbana, 2007) ISBN 978-980-6553-68-2
- Cuatro reportajes, dos décadas, una historia: Tráfico y Guaire, el país y sus intelectuales (Fundación para la Cultura Urbana, 2007) ISBN 978-980-6553-68-2
- Crónicas barbitúricas (Círculo de Tiza, 2019) ISBN 8494913190

=== Novels ===
- It Would Be Night in Caracas (2019) ISBN 8426406947
- No Place to Bury the Dead (2021) ISBN 1644733722
- La isla del Doctor Schubert (2023) ISBN 9788426424532
