= Connie Spenuzza =

American author (born 1953)

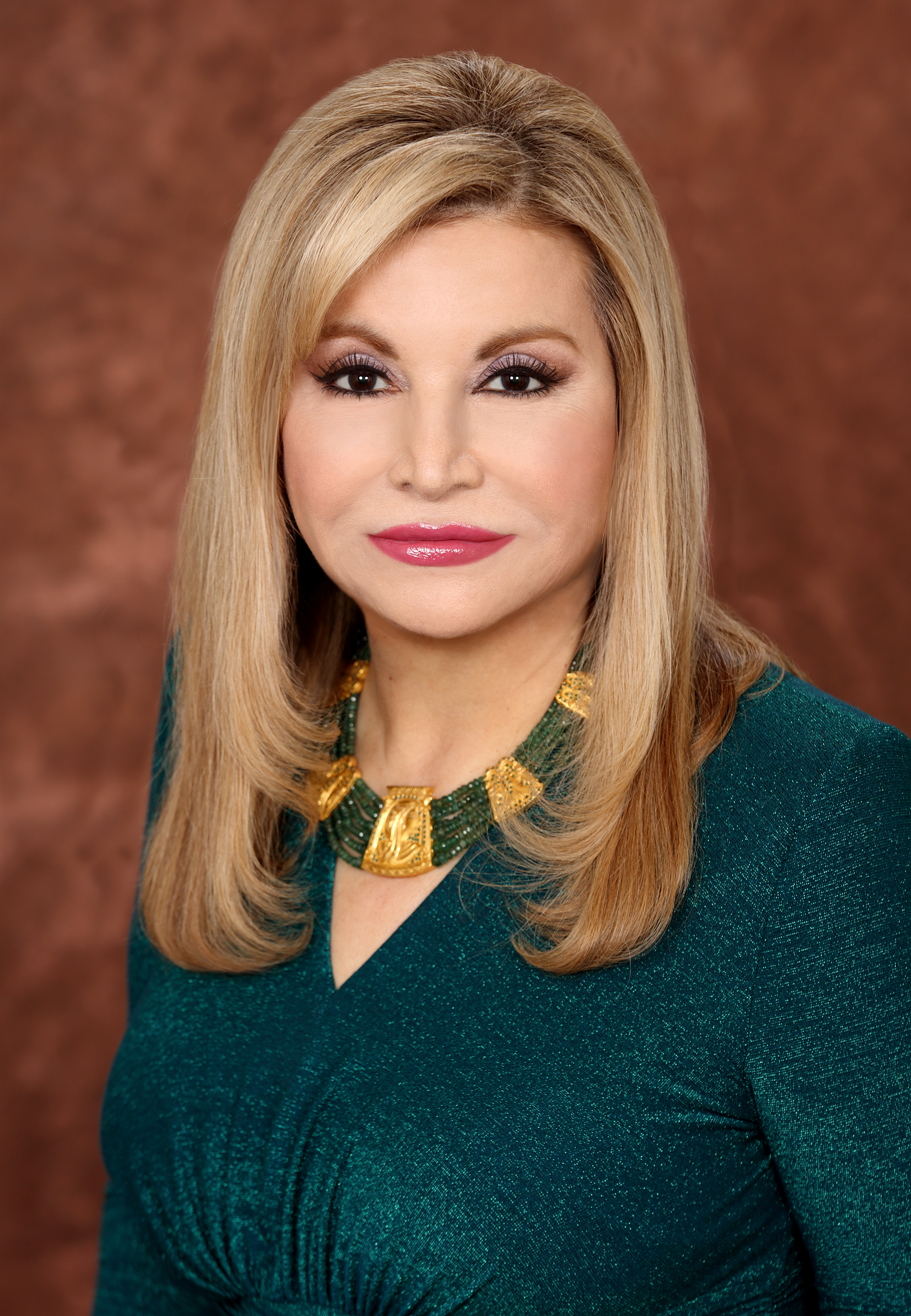
- Born: September 29, 1953 (age 72); Quito, Ecuador
- Education: University of Southern California
- Occupation: Author
- Writing career
- Pen name: Cecilia Velástegui
- Website: conniespenuzza.com

Connie Spenuzza (born September 29, 1953) is an American author who lives in Dana Point, California also known under her pen name Cecilia Velástegui, she has been collected by libraries.

== Early life and education ==
Spenuzza was born in Quito, Ecuador. She graduated from University of Southern California with a master's degree in 1977.

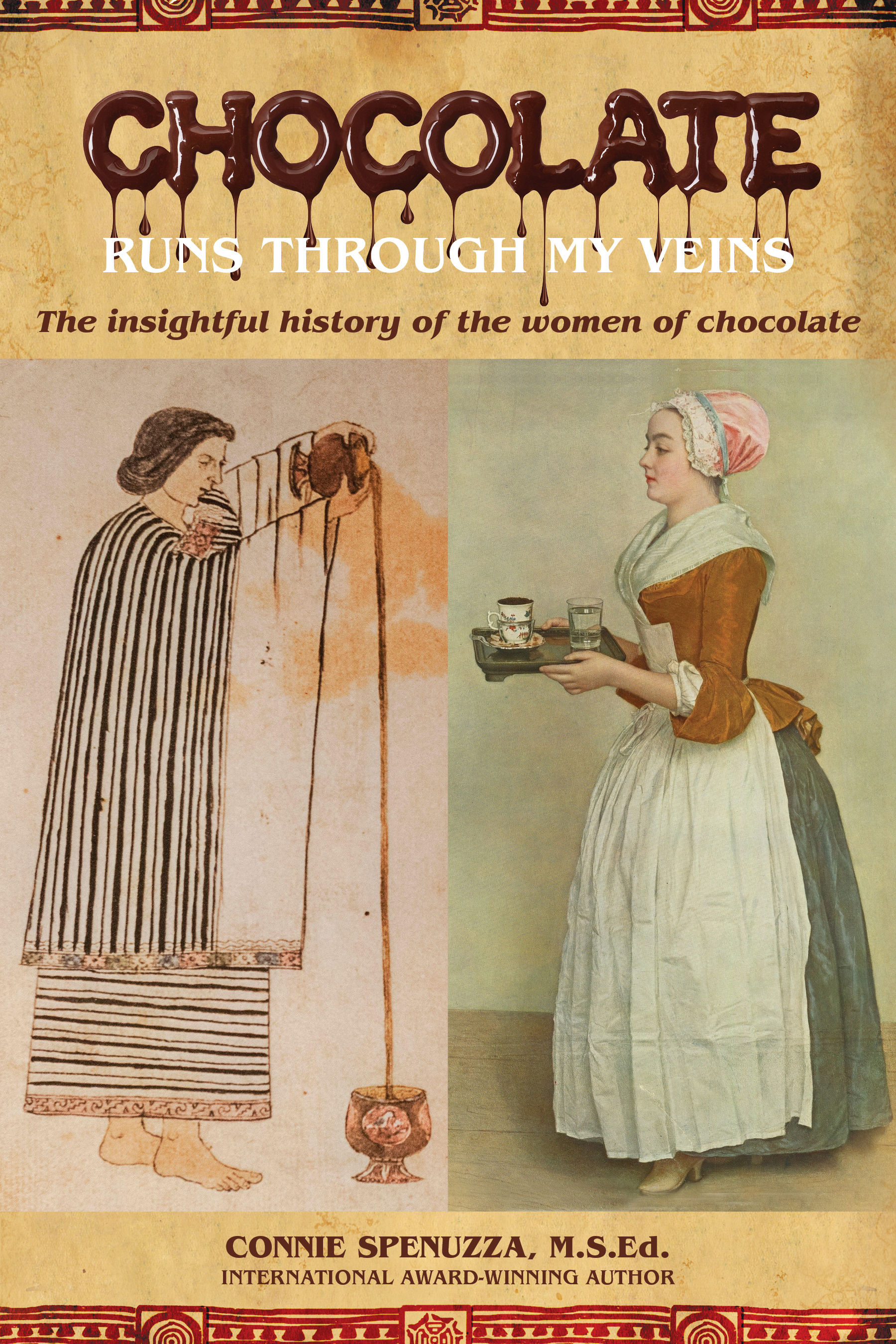
Chocolate Runs Through My Veins book cover

== Career ==
Her first novel, Gathering the Indigo Maidens (2011), was a finalist for the Mariposa Prize. Her second novel, Traces of Bliss (2012), was selected to the National Latino Book Club by the Association of American Publishers and the Las Comadres international organization. Her third novel, Missing in Machu Picchu (2013), was awarded first place in adventure fiction by the International Latino Book Awards, but was given an unfavorable review by Publishers Weekly.

In 2014 her novel Parisian Promises received a positive review from US Review of Books.

Spenuzza has been invited as an author panelist at Literary Orange, the Los Angeles Times Festival of Books, the Big Orange Book, and the Los Angeles Zoo.

Spenuzza also writes children’s bilingual fables. Olinguito Speaks Up-Olinguito alza la voz (2013) received first place for Best Latino Focused Children’s Picture Book by the 2014 International Latino Book Awards.

In 2018 her novel Lucia Zarate: the Odyssey of the World’s Smallest Woman (2017) received first place in fiction from the San Francisco Book Festival. This novel was selected as a 2017 FOREWORD Indies Book Finalist in multicultural fiction.

In 2019, Jubilant Journeys received 2nd Place in Most Inspirational category of the International Latino Book Awards. The first place went to José Andrés, a Nobel Peace Prize nominee and a James Beard Humanitarian Award Winner.

In 2023, Chocolate Runs Through My Veins, was awarded runner-up for first place by the London Book Festival. Spenuzza was then invited as the keynote speaker to the annual lecture sponsored by the Newport Beach California Library Foundation on June 25, 2023.

Foreword Reviews praised her 2024 history book: “ Connie Spenuzza’s The Unique Women of the Venetian Republic is a sumptuous historical review that focuses on Venice from the fifteenth century to the 1797 invasion by Napoleon’s armies, detailing the lives of women who were scholars, writers, artists, opera singers, philanthropists, and courtesans within the city’s complex traditional social structure and culture.”

Kirkus Reviews also praised this book: “A gorgeous book that fully immerses readers in Venetian history, both visually and through its vivid narrative.”

On January 10, 2024, Orange County, California, County Supervisor Katrina Foley presented Spenuzza with a county proclamation honoring her prolific writing and philanthropic career.

Spenuzza was invited by the Angels of the Arts, a support group of the Segerstrom Center of the Arts, to lecture on her book The Unique Women of the Venetian Republic at the Orange County Museum of Art.

Orange Coast Magazine, January 2024 issue, featured a two-page article on Spenuzza, titled International Inspiration: “Connie Spenuzza is an arts patron supreme and an award-winning author who has published 13 books and visited 128 countries.”

In May 2024, the international dynastic order of knighthood of the House of Bourbon-Two Sicilies known as the Constantinian Order of St George knighted Dame Connie Spenuzza in recognition of her literary and philanthropic achievements.

On March 31, 2025, Dame Connie Spenuzza was selected as one of Orange County’s Kick-ass Women for her literary accomplishments and philanthropic contributions to Orange County.

In April 2025, the Los Angeles Book Festival selected Spenuzza's social history book, The Unique Women of the Venetian Republic, as a runner up in the Non fiction category.

== Books ==
- Velástegui, Cecilia (2011). Gathering the Indigo Maidens. Libros Pub. ISBN 978-0983745815.
- Velástegui, Cecilia (2012). Traces of Bliss. Libros Pub. ISBN 978-0983745877.
- Velástegui, Cecilia (2013). Missing in Machu Picchu. Libros Pub. ISBN 978-0985176945.
- Velástegui, Cecilia (2013). Olinguito Speaks Up. Libros Publishing LLC. ISBN 9780985176976.
- Velástegui, Cecilia (2014). Lalo Loves to Help. Libros Publishing Llc. ISBN 9780990671305.
- Velástegui, Cecilia (2015). Parisian Promises. Libros Publishing Llc. ISBN 9780985176914.
- Velástegui, Cecilia (2017). Lucia Zarate: The Odyssey of the World’s Smallest Woman. Libros Publishing Llc. ISBN 9780990671381.
- Spenuzza, Connie (2019). Jubilant Journeys: Experience the Wanderlust Serendipity of a Fifty-Year Journey Across 125 Countries. Libros Publishing. ISBN 9780998703114
- Spenuzza, Connie (29 September 2021). Spanish Colonial Paintings Paired with Engraved Sources. Libros Publishing. ISBN 978-0-9987031-5-2.
- Spenuzza, Connie (14 February 2022). Chocolate Runs Through My Veins: The Insightful History of the Women of Chocolate. Libros Publishing. ISBN 978-0-9987031-6-9.
- Spenuzza, Connie (17 October 2023). The Unique Women of the Venetian Republic. Libros Publishing. ISBN 978-0998703183.
