= Carlos E. Cortés =

Author, professor and public lecturer

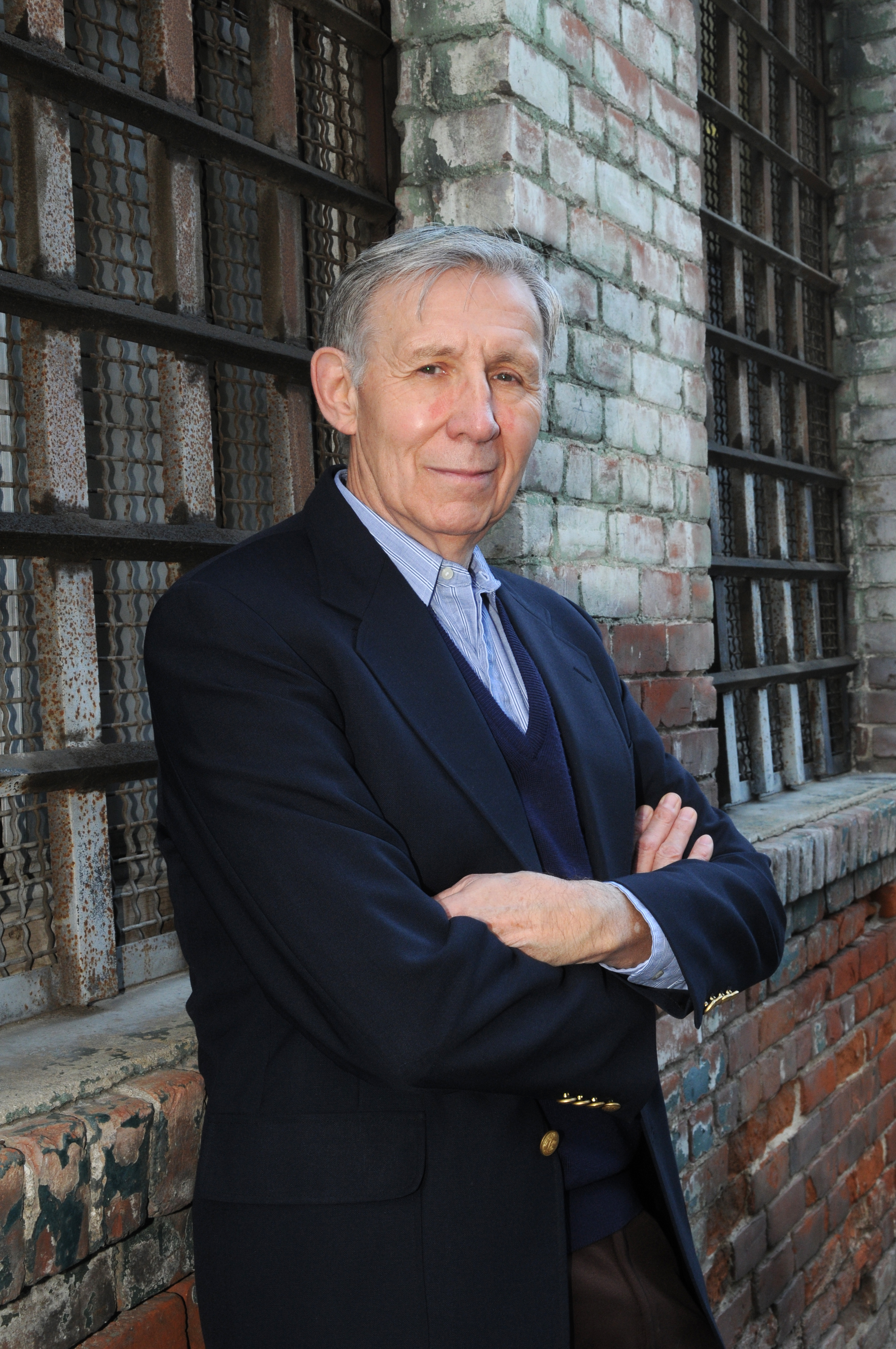
- Cortés in 2009
- Born: Oakland, California, U.S.

Academic background
- Education: University of California, Berkeley; Columbia University Graduate School of Journalism; University of New Mexico

Academic work
- Discipline: History, Media, Diversity
- Institutions: University of California, Riverside

Carlos E. Cortés is a historian, media specialist, and diversity consultant. He is currently the Edward A. Dickson Emeritus Professor of History and co-director of the Health Equity, Social Justice, and Anti-Racism curriculum of the School of Medicine at the University of California, Riverside. He has also been a consultant, speaker, and workshop presenter for hundreds of organizations, government agencies, higher education institutions, and school districts. In addition to having written or edited more than four hundred literary works, he performs his one-person autobiographical play, A Conversation with Alana: One Boy's Multicultural Rite of Passage. He also consults for media entities like DreamWorks and Nickelodeon, serving as Creative/Cultural Advisor for shows like Dora the Explorer and Go, Diego, Go!.

== Early life ==
Carlos Eliseo Cortés was born in Oakland, California, on April 6, 1934. He had three immigrant grandparents. His Jewish maternal grandparents immigrated from Austria (1890's) and Ukraine (early 1900's). They met in Kansas City, Missouri, and courted in Yiddish.

Cortés’ Mexican Catholic paternal grandfather, also named Carlos Eliseo Cortés, became the first Latino graduate of Stanford University and later served as the Guadalajara, Mexico, jefe político of Mexican President Francisco Madero during the early years of the 1910 Mexican Revolution. Under threat of arrest by the Victoriano Huerta military dictatorship, he, with his family, fled to the United States in 1914.

Both of Cortés’ parents (Carlos Federico Cortés and Florence Hoffman Cortés) graduated from the University of California, Berkeley. Marrying in 1933, they soon moved from California to Kansas City. After several years as a tire salesman, Carlos F. joined the small commercial construction firm that had been founded by his father-in-law, Morris Hoffman. The company ultimately became the Hoffman-Cortés Contracting Company.

Carlos spent most of his first eighteen years in Kansas City, attending J. C. Nichols Elementary School and Southwest High School before graduating from Pembroke Country Day School in 1952 as co-valedictorian. Due to his mixed background, he grew up marginally conversant in Spanish and Yiddish.

From 1952 through 1956, Cortés attended his parents’ alma mater, the University of California, Berkeley, earning a degree in Communications and Public Policy. At Cal he joined Alpha Chi Rho fraternity, edited the school annual, the Blue and Gold, and chaired the Student Publications Board. Among his various honors were Phi Beta Kappa, while he participated actively in intramural sports, winning the university's light middleweight boxing championship.

== Journalism interlude ==
In 1957 he received an M.S. from the Columbia University Graduate School of Journalism. While at Columbia, he worked part time for the Frank Goodman theatrical public relations firm, being assigned to the American Shakespeare Festival. He spent the summer of 1957 in Stratford, Connecticut, handling press relations for the Festival. From September, 1957, through September, 1959, he served in the U.S. Army, most of his time as an Information Specialist for the U.S. Army Signal Corps Training Center at Fort Gordon in Augusta, Georgia.

In late 1959, following military service, Cortés moved to Phoenix, Arizona, to become editor of the Phoenix Sun, the lead publication of a weekly newspaper chain.

An article he wrote about William Lytle Schurz, director of area studies at the American Institute for Foreign Trade (AIFT), led to his becoming Schurz’ assistant and an AIFT student, earning a 1962 Bachelor in Foreign Trade and being named recipient of the Barton Kyle Yount Award as the top student in his graduating class. That experience also convinced Cortés to pursue a Ph.D. concentrating on Latin America.

== Academic career ==
Receiving a three-year National Defense Foreign Language Fellowship, Cortés began graduate study at the University of New Mexico in the summer of 1962. There he concurrently pursued an M.A. in Portuguese and Spanish and a Ph.D. in History, with a special interest in Brazil. He earned his M.A. in June, 1965, with a thesis on Brazilian novelist Graciliano Ramos.

From early 1966 to November, 1967, Cortés conducted doctoral dissertation research in Brazil, first in Porto Alegre, the capital of the state of Rio Grande do Sul, and then in Rio de Janeiro. His dissertation focused on the twentieth-century political history of Rio Grande do Sul.

In 1969, Cortés received his Ph.D. in history. His doctoral research also led to his 1974 book, Gaúcho Politics in Brazil: The Politics of Rio Grande do Sul, 1930-1964, which received the Hubert Herring Memorial Award of the Pacific Coast Council on Latin American Studies and was later published in Brazil as Política Gaúcha, 1930-1964.

In January, 1968, Cortés joined the faculty of the University of California, Riverside (UCR). He and Eugene Cota-Robles, a microbiology professor, were UCR's first two Chicano faculty members. He remained at UCR for the rest of his academic career, taking early retirement as a full professor in June, 1994. Since retirement he has occasionally taught classes and held part-time administrative positions on campus.

Cortés joined UCR at a time of higher education turbulence, including the rise of student activism and demands for ethnic studies. As one of only two Mexican-descent faculty at UCR, Cortés was inevitably drawn into these issues. Active in the Chicano Movement, he helped organize the campus’ first Chicano student organization (United Mexican American Students) in 1968 and served on the committee that established UCR's Mexican American Studies and Black Studies programs in 1969. Three years later, in 1972, he became Chair of Mexican American Studies (soon Chicano Studies), serving until 1979. He also introduced UCR's first Chicano History class in January, 1970.

In the fall of 1971, the California Department of Education appointed Cortés to a statewide task force to evaluate social studies textbooks for their compliance with the state education code concerning the treatment of racial and ethnic groups. This experience drew Cortés into the nascent field of multicultural education, in which he soon became known both statewide and nationally.

Within a handful of years, Cortés’ teaching, scholarly, and public service career had gone in multiple new directions. He continued to teach and write about Latin America. But his efforts also now embraced such areas as ethnic studies, multicultural education, and ultimately the field of diversity, equity, and inclusion. Within those areas, Cortés drew upon his communication background to develop a research specialty in the media treatment of diversity, culminating in his influential book, The Children Are Watching: How the Media Teach about Diversity (2000).

He also remained active on campus, serving as chair of Latin American Studies (1970-1972), Chicano Studies (1972-1979), and History (1982-1986). His campus contributions led to the receipt of two of UCR's highest faculty honors: the Distinguished Teaching Award and the Distinguished Public Service Award.

Cortés also received numerous state and national honors. These included the 1980 Distinguished California Humanist Award of the California Council for the Humanities, the 1989 Multicultural Trainer of the Year Award of the American Society for Training and Development, and the 1989 Distinguished Alumni Service Award from his Kansas City, Missouri, high school. In 1993-1994 he served as a Smithsonian Institution Public Lecturer.

== Diversity lecturer ==
In 1994, at the age of 60, Cortés took early retirement from UCR in order to focus his attention on being a diversity consultant, scholar, lecturer, and workshop presenter. He was soon giving some 75-100 presentations a year throughout the United States, Latin America, Asia, Europe, Australia, and Canada, as well as lecturing on comparative culture on cruise ships. In the process, he presented to or consulted for more 150 government agencies, 250 K-12 school entities (districts, counties, states, and private), 350 institutions of higher education, and nearly 500 organizations and private businesses.

Cortés also joined the teaching faculties at a number of institutions, such as the Harvard Summer Institutes for Higher Education, the Federal Executive Institute, and the Summer Institute for Intercultural Communication. He also edited the four-volume 2013 Multicultural America: A Multimedia Encyclopedia.

These efforts led to a number of honors. Among them are the 2001 Outstanding Contribution to Higher Education Award of the National Association of Student Personnel Administrators, UCR's 2004 Emeritus Professor Award, and the 2005 Inspiration Award of the California Association for Bilingual Education. He also received two honorary doctorates, in 2007 from the College of Wooster (Ohio) and in 2010 from Chicago's DePaul University. In 2019, the California Latino Legislative Caucus selected him for a Latino Spirit Award.

In 1999, the mayor of Riverside, California, asked Cortés to help him establish the Mayor's Multicultural Forum to better address diversity in the community. Cortés continues to serve as facilitator of the Forum, a four-times-a-year public gathering, and he coordinated the writing of the city's Inclusive Community Statement and Anti-Racism Vision Statement. In 2016, the city established the Carlos E. Cortés Diversity and Inclusion Award, given annually to a Riverside resident who has made major local contributions to diversity.

== Media consultant ==
Cortés also became involved in various aspects of the media. While writing more than fifty media-related articles, he served as a columnist for the magazine Media & Values and as Scholar in Residence for Univision Communications. He has also consulted for myriad media organizations, including for the Hallmark series, Talking with TJ, and appeared as featured presenter for three episodes of the PBS series, Why in the World?

Then, in 2000, the publication of his book, The Children Are Watching: How the Media Teach about Diversity, drew Cortés even more deeply into media creation. He was asked to become a consultant for Nickelodeon's pre-school animated show, Dora the Explorer, then in development. A few years later he was promoted to Creative/Cultural Advisor. For his contributions Cortés received a 2009 Image Award from the National Association for the Advancement of Colored People.

Cortés has worked with other Nickelodeon shows, such as Go, Diego, Go!, Dora and Friends: Into the City, and Santiago of the Seas. He has also served as Cultural Consultant for the DreamWorks film Puss in Boots: The Last Wish.

== Creative works ==
Cortés has also engaged in creative works as both a writer and a performer. Since high school he had appeared in amateur stage productions in Kansas City, Augusta (Georgia), and Phoenix. At UCR he played both Bud Abbott and Shirley Temple in the campus’ faculty-staff follies to raise money for student scholarships.

Then, in the early 2000s, Cortés began working on his memoir (ultimately published in 2012 as Rose Hill: An Intermarriage before Its Time –- a reference to his parents' pioneering 1933 interethnic marriage). One evening, after a public reading of selections from the manuscript, a theatre director approached him and suggested that he adapt the book into a one-person play.

Taking that advice, Cortés wrote and began performing A Conversation with Alana: One Boy's Multicultural Rite of Passage, a one-hour, one-person autobiographical play, in which he talks with his daughter, Alana, represented by an empty chair. Cortés has performed the play more than 150 times throughout the country. It was published in 2022 by Bad Knee Press, with a cover designed by his granddaughter, Amaya.

Cortés has also written and appeared in a number of other performance pieces. These include a two-person narration-and-guitar story of the life of novelist Tomás Rivera, a former UCR chancellor. He also co-wrote the book and lyrics for the produced musical, We Are Not Alone. In addition, Cortés and his wife, Laurel, wrote and present a performance piece about her friendship with novelist Raymond Chandler.

Cortés also began writing fiction and poetry. His 2016 book of poetry, Fourth Quarter: Reflections of a Cranky Old Man, received Honorable Mention in the 2017 International Latino Book Awards for Best Book of Poetry in English.

In 2025, Inlandia published his first novel, Scouts’ Honor, making Cortés a member of that small cohort of nonagenarians whose debut novels occurred while they were in their nineties.

== Late career activities ==
In the late 2010s, while Cortés was well into his 80's, his career took two new directions. In 2018 he became an inaugural fellow of the University of California National Center for Free Speech and Civic Engagement. His research focused on the fifty-year historical intersection of diversity and speech, leading to a book-in-progress entitled, “Speech vs. Diversity, Diversity vs. Speech”. He now writes a column on diversity and speech for the monthly ezine American Diversity Report. In 2021 he was appointed to the new Content Moderation Advisory Board of the educational materials platform, Teachers Pay Teachers.

Then, in the summer of 2020, at age 86, Cortés agreed to become the inaugural co-director of the UCR School of Medicine’s new Health Equity, Social Justice, and Anti-Racism curriculum. This new challenge drew on his decades of work in diversity, including giving lectures on health care cultural competence.

In 2019, UCR selected Cortés to be an Edward A. Dickson Emeritus Professor. Two years later, in 2021, he received one of the University of California's most prestigious system-wide honors, the Constantine Panunzio Award for outstanding achievements of a UC faculty retiree in the arts, humanities, and social sciences.

== Personal ==
Cortés and his wife, Laurel Vermilyea Cortés, have been married since 1978. Cortés has one daughter from a previous marriage, Alana Madrugada Cortés. She has two daughters, Amaya and Tessa.

== Selected books and edited collections ==
- Mexican Americans and Educational Change, with Alfredo Castañeda, Manuel Ramírez III, and Mario Barrera. New York: Arno Press, 1974.
- Gaúcho Politics in Brazil: The Politics of Rio Grande do Sul, 1930-1964. Albuquerque: University of New Mexico Press, 1974.
- The Mexican American (21-volume series). New York: Arno Press, 1974.
- Three Perspectives on Ethnicity: Blacks, Chicanos, and Native Americans, with Arlin I. Ginsburg, Alan W. F. Green, and James A. Joseph. New York: Putnam's, 1976.
- The Chicano Heritage (55-volume series). New York: Arno Press, 1976.
- Mexico in the Study of Mexican Americans: An Analysis of Transnational Linkages. Denver: Center for Teaching International Relations, University of Denver, 1976.
- Hispanics in the United States (30-volume series). New York: Arno Press, 1980.
- Beyond Language: Social and Cultural Factors in Schooling Language Minority Students (multiple authors). Los Angeles: Evaluation, Dissemination and Assessment Center, California State University, 1986.
- The Children Are Watching: How the Media Teach about Diversity. New York: Teachers College Press, 2000.
- The Making -- and Remaking -- of a Multiculturalist. New York: Teachers College Press, 2002.
- Rose Hill: An Intermarriage before Its Time. Berkeley, California: Heyday, 2012.
- Multicultural America: A Multimedia Encyclopedia (4 volumes). Thousand Oaks, California: Sage, 2013.
- Fourth Quarter: Reflections of a Cranky Old Man. Los Angeles: Bad Knee Press, 2016.
- A Conversation with Alana: One Boy's Multicultural Rite of Passage. Los Angeles: Bad Knee Press, 2022.
- Scouts Honor. Riverside: Inlandia Institute, 2025.

== Selected awards ==
=== At the University of California, Berkeley (1952–1956) ===
- Phi Beta Kappa
- Vernon J. Scott Award
- Golden Bear Honor Society
- Senior Hall of Fame
- Fraternity Scholastic Honor Society

=== At the American Institute for Foreign Trade (1961–1962) ===
- Alfred Knight Scholarship Award
- Barton Kyle Yount Award
- Portuguese Valedictorian

=== At the University of New Mexico (1962–1965) ===
- Phi Kappa Phi

== At the University of California, Riverside (1968–2022) ==
- Distinguished Teaching Award (1976)
- Faculty Public Service Award (1992)
- Emeritus Faculty Award (2004)
- Edward A. Dickson Emeritus Professor (2019)

=== General ===
- 1974 Hubert Herring Memorial Award of the Pacific Coast Council on Latin American Studies (for Gaúcho Politics in Brazil: The Politics of Rio Grande do Sul, 1930-1964)
- 1977 Eleanor Fishburn Award of the Washington EdPress Association (for Curriculum Guidelines for Multiethnic Education)
- 1980 Distinguished California Humanist Award of the California Council for the Humanities
- 1982 Keys to the City, Kansas City, Missouri, and Kansas City, Kansas
- 1986 Business Associate of the Year, Inland Empire Charter Chapter, American Business Women's Association
- 1989 Distinguished Alumnus Award, Pembroke-Hill School, Kansas City, Missouri
- 1989-1990 Inland Empire Hispanic Teacher of the Year Award, Kiwanis Club of Greater San Bernardino
- 1989 Multicultural Trainer of the Year Award, American Society for Training and Development
- 1990 Hubert Herring Memorial Award of the Pacific Coast Council on Latin American Studies (for "To View a Neighbor: The Hollywood Textbook on Mexico")
- 1992 California Council for the Humanities Public Lecturer
- 1993-1994 Smithsonian Institution Public Lecturer
- 2001 Outstanding Contribution to Higher Education Award of the National Association of Student Personnel Administrators
- 2002 Writer-in-Residence, Pembroke Hill School, Kansas City, Missouri
- 2004 Elected Fellow, International Academy of Intercultural Research
- 2005 Inspiration Award, California Association for Bilingual Education
- 2005 Educator of the Year, Hispanic Lifestyle Magazine
- 2007 Honorary Doctor of Humanities, College of Wooster, Wooster, Ohio
- 2009 Image Award, National Association for the Advancement of Colored People
- 2010 Honorary Doctorate, Depaul University, Chicago, Illinois
- 2013 Local Shaker on the Global Scene, World Affairs Council of Inland Southern California
- 2016 Carlos E. Cortés Diversity and Inclusion Award Established by the City of Riverside, California
- 2017 International Latino Book Awards Honorable Mention for the Best Book of Poetry in English (for Fourth Quarter: Reflections of a Cranky Old Man)
- 2019 Latino Spirit Award, California Latino Legislative Caucus
- 2021 Constantine Panunzio Award, University of California
