= Children of Chicago =

2021 novel by Cynthia Pelayo

- Author: Cynthia Pelayo
- Audio read by: Sofia Willingham
- Language: English
- Series: Chicago Saga
- Genre: Horror, mystery
- Publisher: Agora Books
- Publication date: 2021
- Publication place: United States
- Media type: Print (hardback, paperback), ebook, audiobook
- Pages: 304 pages
- ISBN: 1951709209 First edition US hardback
- Followed by: The Shoemaker's Magician

Children of Chicago is a 2021 mystery horror novel written by Cynthia Pelayo.

The novel is the first in the Chicago Saga series, each of which is centered upon a different fairy tale. A second book in the series, The Shoemaker's Magician was published on March 21, 2023.

== Synopsis ==
The novel centers upon Lauren, a detective living in the city of Chicago. She's called in to investigate a murder in Humboldt Park, only to discover that the murder bears striking similarities to one committed decades before: Lauren's own sister. This, along with several other signs, convinces Lauren that the serial killer responsible for the deaths has returned to Chicago. Known only as the Pied Piper, Lauren must confront the past - including a promise she made to the killer themself - in order to stop them from killing again.

== Development ==
While writing the story Pelayo drew upon her own experiences growing up in the city of Chicago, as well as her knowledge of fairy tales and contemporary issues. She specifically highlighted the story "Pied Piper of Hamelin" for the novel. Pelayo also wanted the city of Chicago to feel like its own character, as she felt it was an important part of the main character and story.

== Release ==
Children of Chicago was first published in ebook and hardback format in the United States on March 9, 2021, through Agora Books. A paperback edition was released the following year.

An audiobook adaptation read by Sofia Willingham was published alongside the hardback release, via Tantor Audio.

== Adaptation ==
Film rights to Children of Chicago were optioned in 2022 by Zucker Productions and Lonetree Entertainment, with Janet Zucker and Tony Eldridge set to produce.

== Reception ==
Critical reception for Children of Chicago has been positive. The Los Angeles Review of Books and Tor Nightfire both reviewed Children of Chicago, both praising the work for its use of fairytales as a motif.

=== Awards ===
- International Latino Book Award for Best Mystery (2021, won)
- **Finalist**, Bram Stoker Award for Superior Achievement in a Novel (Children of Chicago, 2021).
