= The Pied Piper of Hamelin (2011 novel) =

2011 British children's novel

- Author: Michael Morpurgo
- Illustrator: Emma Chichester Clark
- Language: English
- Subject: Pied Piper of Hamelin
- Genre: Children's novel
- Set in: Hamelin
- Publisher: Walker Books
- Publication date: 2011
- Publication place: Great Britain
- Pages: 65
- ISBN: 978-1-4063-1511-0
- OCLC: 1176442057
- Dewey Decimal: 823.914

The Pied Piper of Hamelin is a British children's novel written by Michael Morpurgo, and illustrated by Emma Chichester Clark. It was originally published in Great Britain by Walker Books in 2011. Morpurgo's interpretation of the classic tale encompasses a whole range of social priorities that will ultimately benefit the whole town. According to Morpurgo, "if you don’t look at equality and fairness, we'll never put things right; it does mean sharing more, which we are not very good at doing".

== Synopsis ==
A tall orphan boy with a crutch narrates this version of the well-known story. He starts the story off by describing the terrible conditions of life for the orphaned and abandoned children in Hamelin. He explains how they are subjected to scavenging for food, while the "rich and the greedy live like kings and queens behind the walls and gates of their grand houses".

When rats invade the town, they soon start to eat all the food that the neglected children had been scrounging for. One day the mayor of Hamelin observes the tall boy and his friend Emma fighting back against the infestation of rats, and assigns them the position as the towns "rat boy and rat girl". But their efforts to keep the rats away from the wealthy homes is met with defeat.

During a town council meeting to address the rat problem, a colourful character called the Pied Piper bursts in and offers to get rid of the rats in exchange for one gold coin, just one, because "enough is always as good as a feast", he tells them. So he starts playing his silver flute, and leads the rats away, but, the unscrupulous mayor goes back on his word to pay, so the Pied Piper gets even by luring the children away too. He sends word back to the town, that they have one year and one day to rehabilitate the town; clean it up and make it fit and safe for all of the children to come back and live in.

The mayor and the townspeople then implement a reform to the education system by constructing a school and playground for the poor. They create a fair housing market and clean up all the rubbish that formerly littered the streets, as well as reforming health care to make sure it is available for everyone, regardless of their social status. When the Pied Piper sees that his conditions have been satisfied, the children are returned to a better place to live for all.

== Background ==
Morpurgo said he decided to retell the story because no one was reading it anymore, parents and teachers quit reading it "because it's this very strange and sinister story about a man in strange clothes taking children away from their parents". So his goal was to make the narrative relevant in today's modern world, without "dumbing it down", while also keeping intact the "darkness" surrounding the story with the infestation of the rats.

=== Pied Piper of Hamelin ===
The Pied Piper of Hamelin, also known as the Pan Piper or the Rat-Catcher of Hamelin, is the title character of a legend from the town of Hamelin, Germany. The legend dates back to the Middle Ages. The earliest references describe a piper, dressed in multicoloured pied clothing, who was a rat catcher hired by the town to lure rats away with his magic pipe. When the citizens refused to pay for this service as promised, he retaliated by using his instrument's magical power on their children, leading them away as he had the rats.

== Reception ==
Morpurgo gives the old story about breaking promises a new spin that might resonate with the Occupy Wall Street protesters.

— Horn Book Magazine

Margaret Bush wrote in the School Library Journal that "Clark's energetic pen and acrylic scenes, though warm in color and incorporating folk-art motifs, build the horror of the rodents piling up by the thousands and chasing people through town; the nightmarish rat invasion will satisfy readers yearning for something really creepy". Susan Lempke from Horn Book Magazine said "the first third of the book is pretty grim, but Clark's watercolors lighten the mood a little with lots of patterns and by depicting the rats as slightly comical". Amanda Craig of The Times said "children are seen dancing through the book, and it is given a topical ring with a greedy mayor being taught a lesson in responsibility; Clark's illustrations are outstanding".

Kirkus Reviews opined that "it's a nuanced and substantial retelling of the well-known morality tale; Clark's pencil-and-acrylic illustrations are bright and beautifully composed; the teeming rats radiate menace without being actively scary". Publishers Weekly said the novel has "a blatant social agenda; a corrupt, fetid setting; a scathing indictment of the ruling class; it's enough to make even deep-seated blue staters blanch". Hazel Rochman wrote in The Booklist that "true to the spirit of the original tale, this attractive retelling adds some new twists and a happy ending without denying the dark, universal drama".

John Cohen of Reading Time stated "unlike the original poem this retelling has a happy ending that might not please the purists but is still eminently satisfying; the illustrations are rich in colour and action and while not extending the story are a wonderful complement". The Bulletin of the Center for Children's Books wrote that while "Morpurgo takes the gentler path, choosing to bring the children back to their chastened parents; it’s a far longer and frequently more tedious path than the tightly focused folktale; Clark's watercolors feature a piper who's just shifty-eyed enough to provide a bit of menace; and the rats steal every scene they’re in and ramp up the eeeeuw! factor".

Trevor Dickinson of The School Librarian noted how the "writer and artist have created here a work of immense and deeply moving energy;iIt is a truly remarkable achievement combining a great variety of illustration shapes and sizes, all of them giving whole-hearted and eye-catching support to an outstanding text". Meghan Gurdon wrote in The Wall Street Journal that "in this iteration the townsfolk get a second chance; the piper promises to return with their children in one year's time if they turn Hamelin into a decent place for everyone; this egalitarian ermine-free utopia – ideal reading for the children of Occupy Wall Street protesters – looks particularly appealing thanks to Clark's gloriously colorful pencil-and-acrylic illustrations".

== Musical adaptation ==
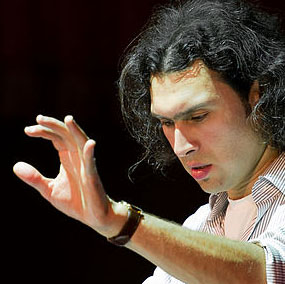
Chief conductor Vladimir Jurowski

In 2015, the novel was adapted into a musical performed by the London Philharmonic Orchestra, which was accompanied by a children's choir from Deansfield primary school. Morpurgo and British actress Natalie Walter were the narrators of the performance. Vladimir Jurowski was the chief conductor for the performance, and the music was written by English composer Colin Matthews. Matthews said the task of composing the music was a little "daunting", in that "if it's got to be the most beautiful music that's ever been written, then it's going to have to be by someone else". So he used Claude Debussy's solo flute piece Syrinx and completely reworked it with a full orchestra accompaniment. One of the reasons Jurowski was keen to do the project is because he believes there is a "huge deficit of good musical works written for children outside of popular culture; there's a general misconception that children can't take complex sonorities, but that's not true", he argues. He also complimented Morpurgo's writing, opining that his "books are both informative and entertaining, but they've also got a very high thesis at the heart of them".

In her review of the performance for The Guardian, Erica Jeal wrote that "Matthews’s fifty-minute score does not talk down to the youngest in its audience; something in which he emulates his mentor Benjamin Britten". She noted that "the choir could perhaps have been given more to do, and the passage when the town is rebuilt seems more static than the rest – but otherwise, the piece is beautifully judged, and the LPO did it full justice".

== See also ==
- List of literary accounts of the Pied Piper
