= Pied Piper's House =

Medieval building in Hamelin, Germany

Coordinates: 52.1042°N 9.3607°E

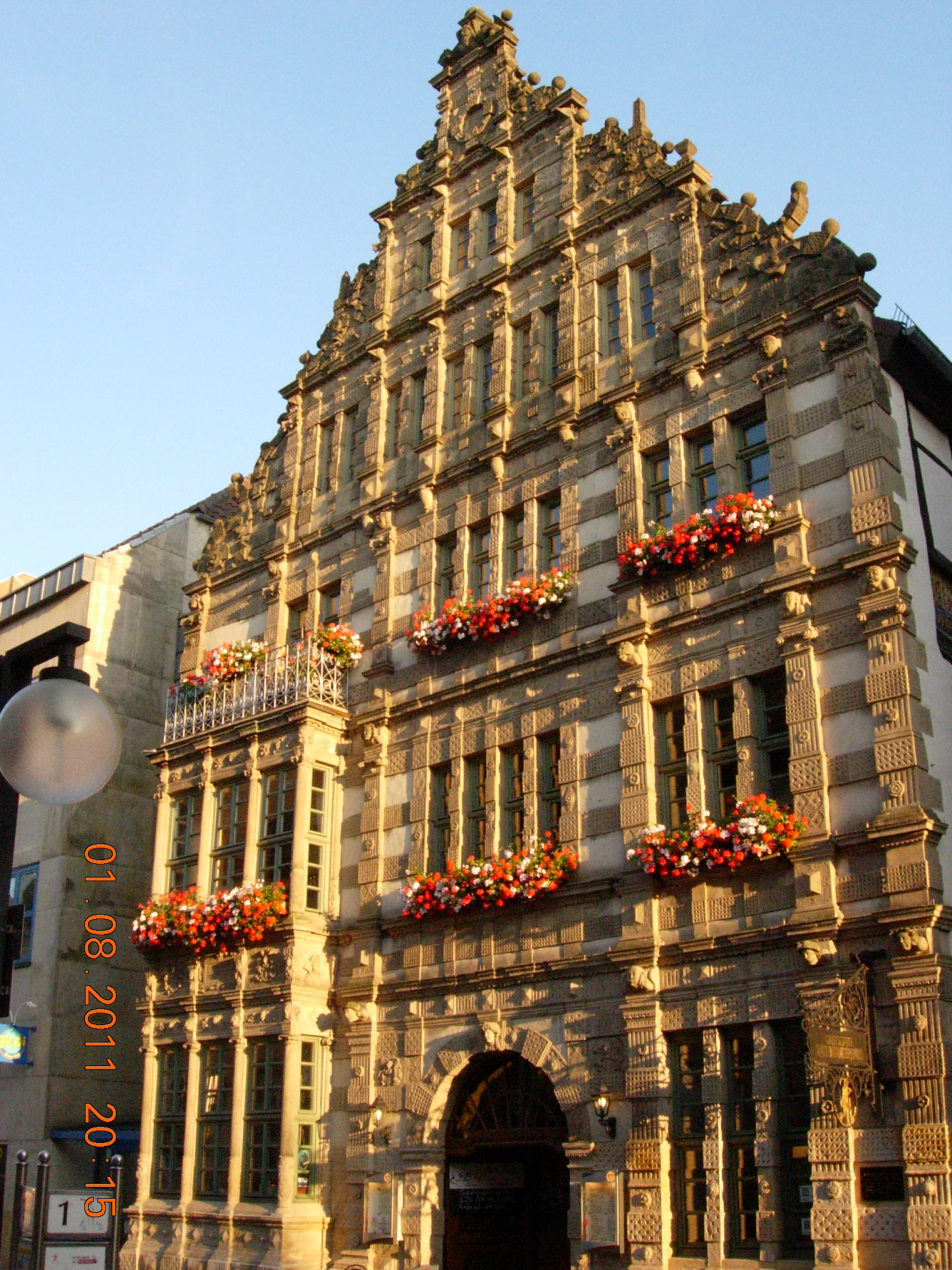
The Pied Piper's House, Hamelin

The Pied Piper's House or Rattenfängerhaus ("Rat Catcher's House") is a half-timbered building in Hamelin. It is named after an inscription on its side which purports to be an eyewitness account of the events of the Pied Piper of Hamelin story, describing the departure of the Hamelin children on 26 June 1284. An English translation given on a plaque reads:

A.D. 1284 - on the 26th of June - the day of St. John and St. Paul - 130 children - born in Hamelin - were led out of the town by a piper wearing multicoloured clothes. After passing the Calvary near the Koppenberg they disappeared forever.

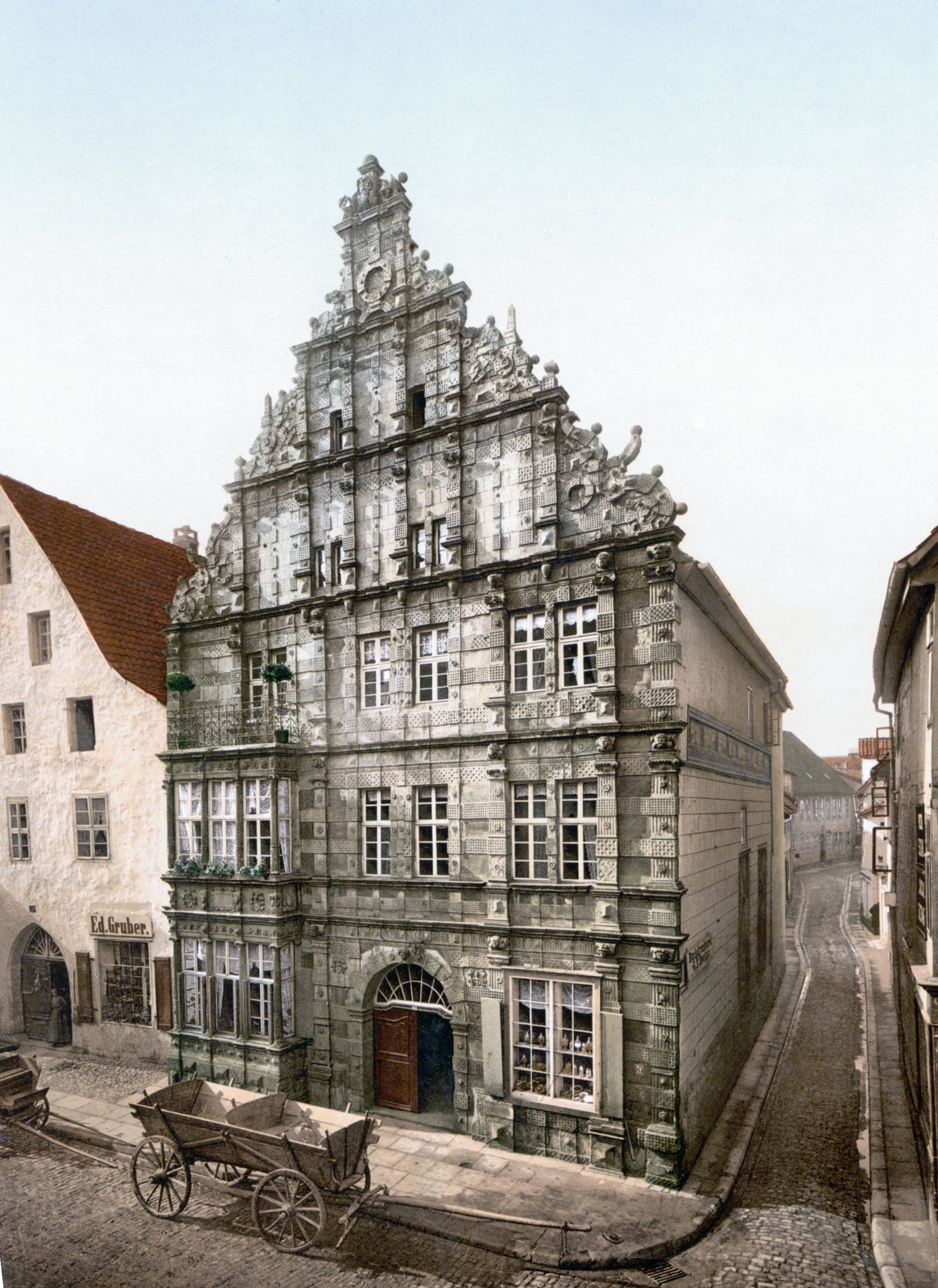
The house in 1900

Although the stone façade dates from 1602, the building itself is much older. The façade was built for Mayor Hermann Arendes by the architects Johann Hundertossen and/or Eberhard Wilkening in the style of the Renaissance. The picture dated 1900 shows the adjacent legendary "Street without Music" with a view of buildings that no longer stand today. The stone structure pictured to the left of the Pied Piper's House is also no longer in existence.

The bay window on the left of the building is called the Utlucht, which means "looking out" in Low German. There was a highly decorated gable mounted here before 1850, parts of which may be seen at the lapidarium of the Hamelin Museum.

The building is now a Hamelin City-owned restaurant. There are many works of art at the Pied Piper's House. They have been purchased by the city museum and should be available to be seen at the re-opening in the summer.
