= Pied Piper of Hamelin =

German legend

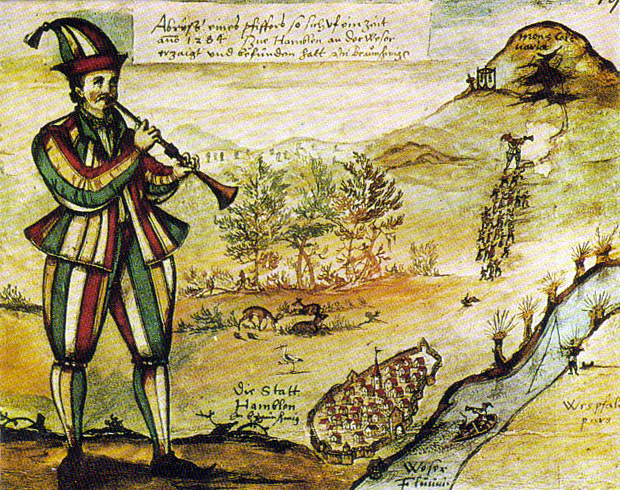
1592 painting of the Pied Piper copied from the glass window of Marktkirche in Hamelin

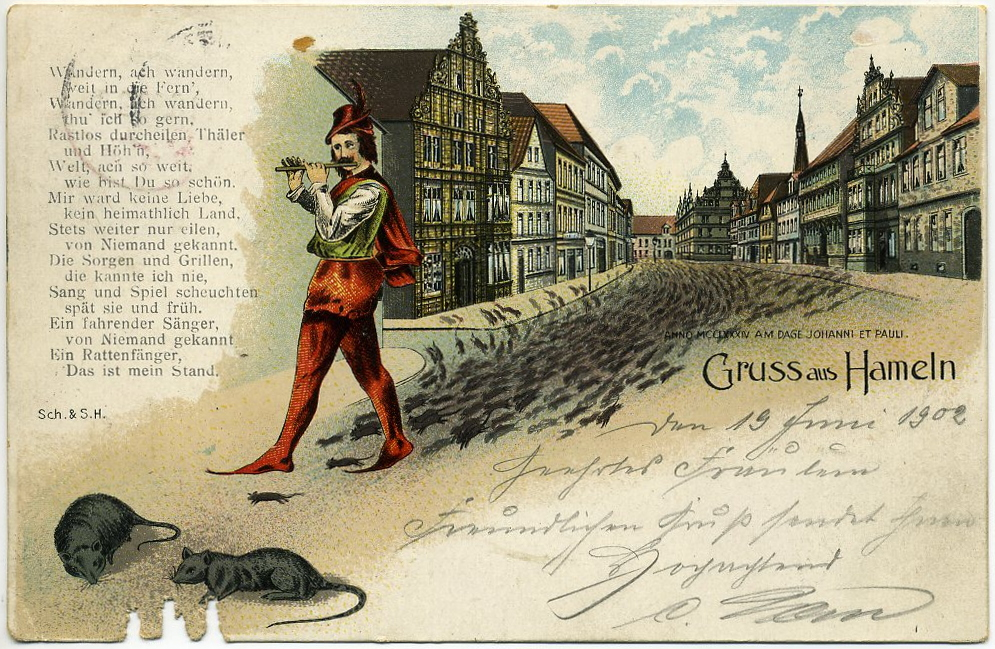
Postcard "Gruss aus Hameln" featuring the Pied Piper of Hamelin, 1902

The Pied Piper of Hamelin (German: der Rattenfänger von Hameln), also known as the Pan Piper or the Rat-Catcher of Hamelin, is the title character of a legend from the town of Hamelin (Hameln), Lower Saxony, Germany. It involves a singular, unknown man who charms dozens of children out of their homes and vanishes with them.

The legend dates back to the Middle Ages. The earliest references describe a piper, dressed in multicoloured ("pied") clothing, who was a rat catcher hired by the town to lure rats away with his magic pipe. When the citizens refused to pay for this service as promised, he retaliated by using his instrument's magical power on their children, leading them away as he had the rats. This version of the story spread as folklore and has appeared in the writings of Johann Wolfgang von Goethe, the Brothers Grimm, and Robert Browning, among others. The phrase "pied piper" has become a metaphor for a person who attracts a following through charisma or false promises.

Various theories have arisen about the origin and symbolism of the Pied Piper. Some suggest he was a symbol of hope to the people of Hamelin, which had been subjected to plague; he drew the rats from Hamelin, saving the people from the epidemic.

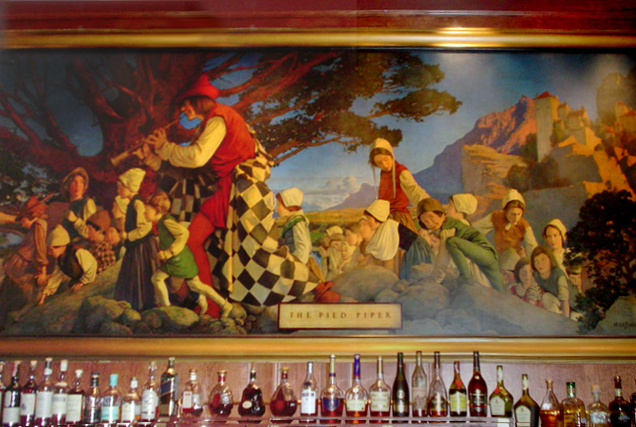
1909 Maxfield Parrish mural of the Pied Piper of Hamelin at the Palace Hotel, San Francisco

== Plot ==
As the town Hamelin is suffering from a rat infestation, a piper dressed in multicoloured ("pied") clothing appears, claiming to be a rat-catcher. He promises the burgermeister a solution to their problem with the rats. The burgermeister, in turn, promises to pay him 1,000 guilders for the removal of the rats. The piper accepts and plays his pipe to lure the rats into the Weser River, where all the rats drown.

Despite the piper's success, the burgermeister reneges on his promise and refuses to pay him the full sum (reputedly reduced to 50 guilders), even going so far as to blame the piper for bringing the rats himself in an extortion attempt. Enraged, the piper storms out of the town, vowing to return later to take revenge. On Saint John and Paul's day, while the adults are in church, the piper returns, dressed in green like a hunter and playing his pipe. In doing so, he attracts the town's children. 130 children follow him out of town and into a mountain cave, after which they are never seen again. Depending on the version, at most three children remained behind; one is lame and could not follow quickly enough, the second is deaf, so could not hear the music, and the last is blind, so unable to see where he was going. These three inform the townsfolk of what had happened when they came out from church.

Other versions depict the Pied Piper leading the children to the top of Koppelberg Hill, where he takes them to a beautiful land, or a place called Koppenberg Mountain, or Transylvania. In yet other versions, he makes them walk into the Weser River as he did with the rats, and they all drown. Or the Piper returns the children after extorting payment, or the children are returned only after the villagers pay several times the original payment in gold.

The Hamelin street named Bungelosenstrasse ("street without drums") is supposedly the last place that the children were seen. Ever since, music or dancing has not been allowed on this street.

== Background ==
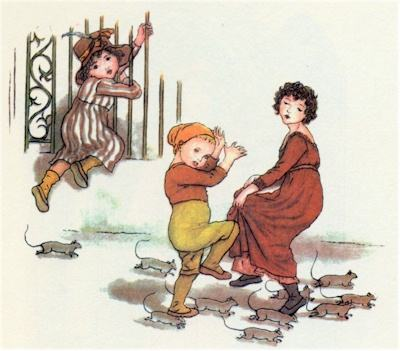
The rats of Hamelin: Illustration by Kate Greenaway for Robert Browning's "The Pied Piper of Hamelin"

The earliest mention of the story seems to have been on a stained-glass window placed in the Church of Hamelin c. 1300. The window was described in several accounts between the 14th and 17th centuries. It was destroyed in 1660. Based on the surviving descriptions, a modern reconstruction of the window has been created by historian Hans Dobbertin. It features the colourful figure of the Pied Piper and several figures of children dressed in white.

The window is generally considered to have been created in memory of a tragic historical event for the town. According to multiple secondary discussions of Hamelin’s town records, an entry dated 1384 stated: "It is 100 years since our children left."

Although research has been conducted for centuries, no explanation for the historical event is universally accepted as true. In any case, the rats were first added to the story in a version from c. 1559 and are absent from earlier accounts.

=== 14th-century Decan Lude chorus book ===
Decan Lude of Hamelin was reported c. 1384 to have in his possession a chorus book containing a Latin verse giving an eyewitness account of the event.

=== 15th-century Lüneburg manuscript ===
The Lüneburg manuscript (c. 1440–50) gives an early German account of the event. An article by James P. O'Donnell in The Saturday Evening Post (24 December 1955) tells how an elderly German researcher, Heinrich Spanuth, discovered the earliest version of the story in the Lüneburg city archives in 1936.

On the back of the last page of a chronicle called The Golden Chain, written in Latin in 1370 by the monk Heinrich of Herford, a written version in a different handwriting has the following account:

Here follows a marvellous wonder, which transpired in the town of Hamelin in the diocese of Minden, in this Year of Our Lord, 1284, on the Feast of Saints John and Paul. A certain young man thirty years of age, handsome and well-dressed, so that all who saw him admired him because of his appearance, crossed the bridges and entered the town by the West Gate. He then began to play all through the town a silver pipe of the most magnificent sort. All the children who heard his pipe, in the number of 130, followed him to the East Gate and out of the town to the so-called execution place or Calvary. There they proceeded to vanish, so that no trace of them could be found. The mothers of the children ran from town to town, but they found nothing. It is written: A voice was heard from on high, and a mother was bewailing her son. And as one counts the years according to the Year of Our Lord or according to the first, second or third year of an anniversary, so do the people in Hamelin reckon the years after the departure and disappearance of their children. This report I found in an old book. And the mother of the Dean Johann von Lüde saw the children depart. (Note: O'Donnell translates the name "Johann von Lüde" as "John of Luede" (the original Latin sentence goes: "Et mater domini Johannis de Lude decani vidit pueros recedentes"), uses the description "Calvary Cross", and makes no mention of an execution place. O'Donnell also writes that the piper plays on a "magic silver flute". Both O'Donnell and Wolfgang Wieder write "the Weser Gate" instead of "the West Gate". All three sources translate decani with "deacon", but he was a Stiftsdechant, which in German can also be written Dekan and Dekant. In English this position is called Dean. Johann von Lüde was a dean, not a deacon.)

=== Rattenfängerhaus ===
It is rendered in the following form in an inscription on a house known as Rattenfängerhaus (English: "Rat Catcher's House" or Pied Piper's House) in Hamelin:

anno 1284 am dage johannis et pauli war der 26. juni dorch einen piper mit allerley farve bekledet gewesen cxxx kinder verledet binnen hameln geboren to calvarie bi den koppen verloren

Translation:

(In the year 1284 on the day of [Saints] John and Paul on 26 June 130 children born in Hamelin were lured by a piper clothed in many colours to Calvary near the Koppen, [and] lost)

According to author Fanny Rostek-Lühmann, this is the oldest surviving account. Koppen (High German Kuppe, meaning a knoll or domed hill) seems to be a reference to one of several hills surrounding Hamelin. Which of them was intended by the manuscript's author remains uncertain.

=== The Wedding House ===
A similar inscription can be found on the "Wedding-house" or Hochzeitshaus, a fine structure erected between 1610 and 1617 for marriage festivities, but diverted from its purpose since 1721. Behind rises the spire of the parish church of St. Nicholas, which in the words of an English book of folklore, may still "enwall stones that witness how the parents prayed, while the Piper wrought sorrow for them without":

Nach Christi Geburt 1284 Jahr
Gingen bei den Koppen unter Verwahr
Hundert und dreissig Kinder, in Hameln geboren
von einem Pfeiffer verfürt und verloren

Translation:

In the year of Our Lord 1284
went into the Koppen under custody
130 children born in Hamelin
by a piper seduced and lost

=== The Town Gate ===
A portion of the town gate dating from 1556 is currently exhibited at the Hamelin Museum. According to Hamelin Museum, this stone is the oldest surviving sculptural evidence for the legend. It bears the following inscription:

Anno 1556 / Centu[m] ter denos
C[um] mag[us] ab urbe puellos /
Duxerat a[n]te a[n]nos 272.
Condita porta fuit

Translation:

In the year 1556,
272 years after the magician
stole 130 children from the city,
this gate was founded.

=== Verses in the monastery at Hamelin ===
The Hamelin Museum writes:

In the mid 14th century, a monk from Minden, Heinrich von Herford, puts together a collection of holy legends called the "Catena Aurea". It speaks of a "miracle" that took place in 1284 in Hamelin. A youth appeared and played on a strange silver flute. Every child who heard the flute followed the stranger. They left Hamelin by the Eastern gate and disappeared at Kalvarien Hill. This is the oldest known account of this occurrence. Around this time, a verse of rhyme is found in "zu Hameln im Kloster". It tells about the children's disappearance. It is written in red ink on the title page of a missal. It bewails "the 130 beloved Hamelner children" who were "eaten alive by Calvaria". The original verses are probably the oldest written source of this legend. It has been missing for hundreds of years. (Note: Catena Aurea in Latin is the same as The Golden Chain in English)

However, different versions of transcriptions of handwritten copies still exist. One was published by Heinrich Meibom in 1688. Another was included by Johann Daniel Gottlieb Herr under the title Passionale Sanctorum in Collectanea zur Geschichte der Stadt Hameln. His manuscript is dated 1761. Some Latin verses had a prose version underneath:

Maria audi nos, tibi Filius nil negat.
Post duo C. C. mille post octoginta quaterue
—Annus hic est ille, quo languet sexus uterque—
Orbantis pueros centumque triginta Joannis
Et Pauli caros Hamelenses non sine damnis,
Fatur, ut omnes eos vivos Calvaria sorpsit,
Christi tuere reos, ne tam mala res quibus obsit.

Anno millesimo ducentesimo octuagesimo quarto in die Johannis et Pauli perdiderunt Hamelenses centum et triginta pueros, qui intraverunt montem Calvariam.

Translation:

Mary, hear us, for your Son denies you nothing.
1284 is that year when members of
both sexes languish (through weakness),
the year of the day John and Paul, which the 130 dear children of Hamelin swept away
and not without doom.
It is said that Calvary swallowed them alive.
Christ, protect the guilty so that no similar evil fate overtake them.

In the year one thousand two hundred and eighty-four, on the day of John and Paul, the Hamelin lost a hundred and thirty children who entered Calvary mount.

=== 16th- and 17th-century sources ===
Somewhere between 1559 and 1565, Count Froben Christoph von Zimmern included a version in his Zimmerische Chronik. This appears to be the earliest account which mentions the plague of rats. Von Zimmern dates the event only as "several hundred years ago" (vor etlichen hundert jarn [sic]), so that his version throws no light on the conflict of dates. Another contemporary account is that of Johann Weyer in his De praestigiis daemonum (1563).

== Theories ==
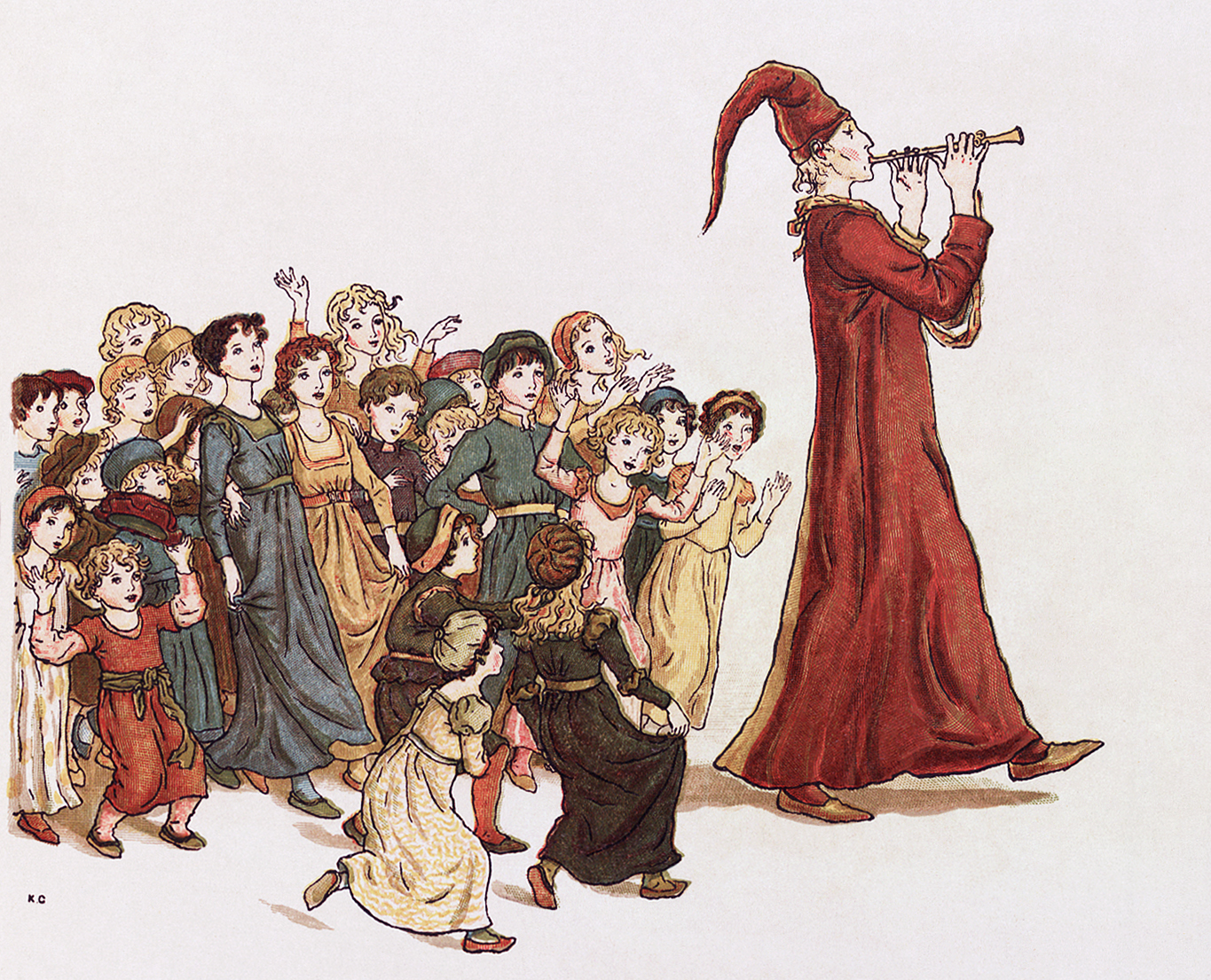
The Pied Piper leads the children out of Hamelin. Illustration by Kate Greenaway for Robert Browning's "The Pied Piper of Hamelin"

=== Natural causes ===
A number of theories suggest that children died of some natural causes such as disease or starvation, and that the Piper was a symbolic figure of Death. Analogous themes which are associated with this theory include the Dance of Death, Totentanz or Danse Macabre, a common medieval trope. Some of the scenarios that have been suggested as fitting this theory include that the children drowned in the river Weser, were killed in a landslide or contracted some disease during an epidemic. Another modern interpretation reads the story as alluding to an event where Hamelin children were lured away by a pagan or heretic sect to forests near Coppenbrügge (the mysterious Koppen "hills" of the poem) for ritual dancing where they all perished during a sudden landslide or collapsing sinkhole.

=== Emigration ===
Speculation on the emigration theory is based on the idea that by the 13th century, overpopulation of the area resulted in the oldest son owning all the land and power (majorat), leaving the rest as serfs. It has also been suggested that one reason the emigration of the children was never documented was that the children were sold to a recruiter from the Baltic region of Eastern Europe, a practice that was not uncommon at the time. In his book The Pied Piper: A Handbook, Wolfgang Mieder states that historical documents exist showing that people from the area including Hamelin did help settle parts of Transylvania. Emily Gerard reports in The Land Beyond the Forest an element of the folktale that "popular tradition has averred the Germans who about that time made their appearance in Transylvania to be no other than the lost children of Hamelin, who, having performed their long journey by subterranean passages, reissued to the light of day through the opening of a cavern known as the Almescher Höhle, in the north-east of Transylvania." Transylvania had suffered under lengthy Mongol invasions of Central Europe, led by two grandsons of Genghis Khan and which date from around the time of the earliest appearance of the legend of the piper, the early 13th century.

In the version of the legend posted on the official website for the town of Hamelin, another aspect of the emigration theory is presented:

Among the various interpretations, reference to the colonization of East Europe starting from Low Germany is the most plausible one: The "Children of Hameln" would have been in those days citizens willing to emigrate being recruited by landowners to settle in Moravia, East Prussia, Pomerania or in the Teutonic Land. It is assumed that in past times all people of a town were referred to as "children of the town" or "town children" as is frequently done today. The "Legend of the children's Exodus" was later connected to the "Legend of expelling the rats". This most certainly refers to the rat plagues being a great threat in the medieval milling town and the more or less successful professional rat catchers.

The theory is provided credence by the fact that family names common to Hamelin at the time "show up with surprising frequency in the areas of Uckermark and Prignitz, near Berlin."

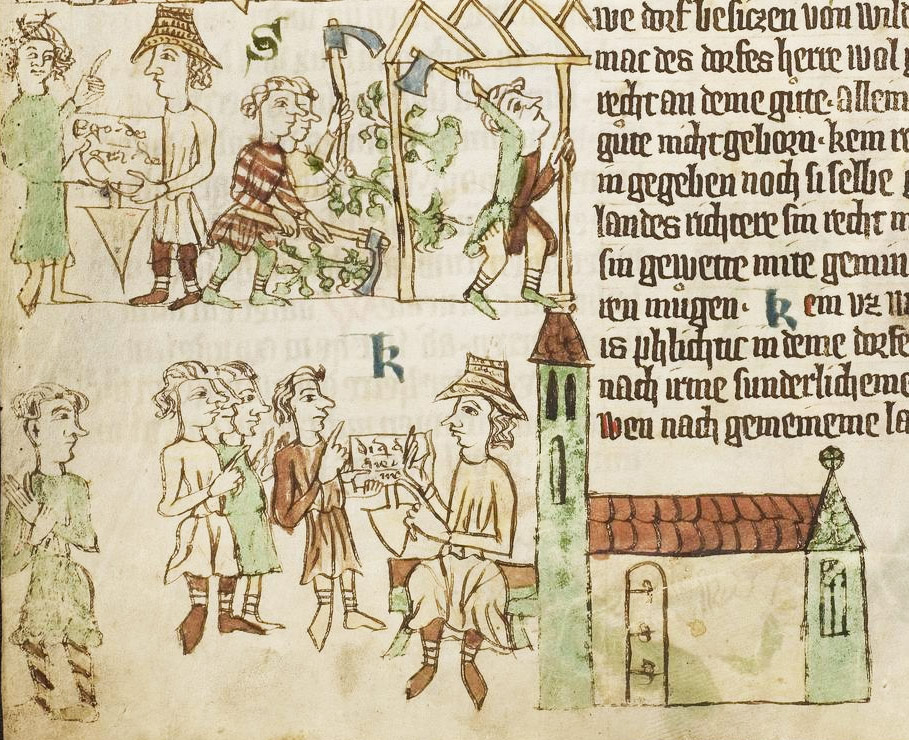
Lokator, in hat

Historian Ursula Sautter, citing the work of linguist Jürgen Udolph, offers this hypothesis in support of the emigration theory:

"After the defeat of the Danes at the Battle of Bornhöved in 1227," explains Udolph, "the region south of the Baltic Sea, which was then inhabited by Slavs, became available for colonization by the Germans." The bishops and dukes of Pomerania, Brandenburg, Uckermark and Prignitz sent out glib "locators", medieval recruitment officers, offering rich rewards to those who were willing to move to the new lands. Thousands of young adults from Lower Saxony and Westphalia headed east. And as evidence, about a dozen Westphalian place names show up in this area. Indeed there are five villages called Hindenburg running in a straight line from Westphalia to Pomerania, as well as three eastern Spiegelbergs and a trail of etymology from Beverungen south of Hamelin to Beveringen northwest of Berlin to Beweringen in modern Poland.

Udolph favours the hypothesis that the Hamelin youths wound up in what is now Poland. Genealogist Dick Eastman cited Udolph's research on Hamelin surnames that have shown up in Polish phonebooks:

Linguistics professor Jürgen Udolph says that 130 children did vanish on a June day in the year 1284 from the German village of Hamelin (Hameln in German). Udolph entered all the known family names in the village at that time and then started searching for matches elsewhere. He found that the same surnames occur with amazing frequency in the regions of Prignitz and Uckermark, both north of Berlin. He also found the same surnames in the former Pomeranian region, which is now a part of Poland.

Udolph surmises that the children were actually unemployed youths who had been sucked into the German drive to colonize its new settlements in Eastern Europe. The Pied Piper may never have existed as such, but, says the professor, "There were characters known as lokators who roamed northern Germany trying to recruit settlers for the East." Some of them were brightly dressed, and all were silver-tongued.

Professor Udolph can show that the Hamelin exodus should be linked with the Battle of Bornhöved in 1227 which broke the Danish hold on Eastern Europe. That opened the way for German colonization, and by the latter part of the thirteenth century there were systematic attempts to bring able-bodied youths to Brandenburg and Pomerania. The settlement, according to the professor's name search, ended up near Starogard in what is now northwestern Poland. A village near Hamelin, for example, is called Beverungen and has an almost exact counterpart called Beveringen, near Pritzwalk, north of Berlin and another called Beweringen, near Starogard.

Local Polish telephone books list names that are not the typical Slavic names one would expect in that region. Instead, many of the names seem to be derived from German names that were common in the village of Hamelin in the thirteenth century. In fact, the names in today's Polish telephone directories include Hamel, Hamler and Hamelnikow, all apparently derived from the name of the original village.

=== Other ===
Some theories have linked the disappearance of the children to mass psychogenic illness in the form of dancing mania. Dancing mania outbreaks occurred during the 13th century, including one in 1237 in which a large group of children travelled from Erfurt to Arnstadt (about 20 km (12 mi)), jumping and dancing all the way, in marked similarity to the legend of the Pied Piper of Hamelin, which originated at around the same time.

Others have suggested that the children left Hamelin to be part of a pilgrimage, a military campaign, or even a new Children's Crusade (which is said to have occurred in 1212) but never returned to their parents. These theories see the unnamed Piper as their leader or a recruiting agent. The townspeople made up this story (instead of recording the facts) to avoid the wrath of the church or the king.

William Manchester's A World Lit Only by Fire—without citing any evidence—dates the events specifically to June 20th, 1484, and further claims that the Pied Piper was a psychopathic paedophile who "used them in unspeakable ways." Distinguished historian Jeremy duQuesnay Adams has noted Manchester's work contained "some of the most gratuitous errors of fact and eccentricities of judgment this reviewer has read (or heard) in quite some time."

== Adaptations ==
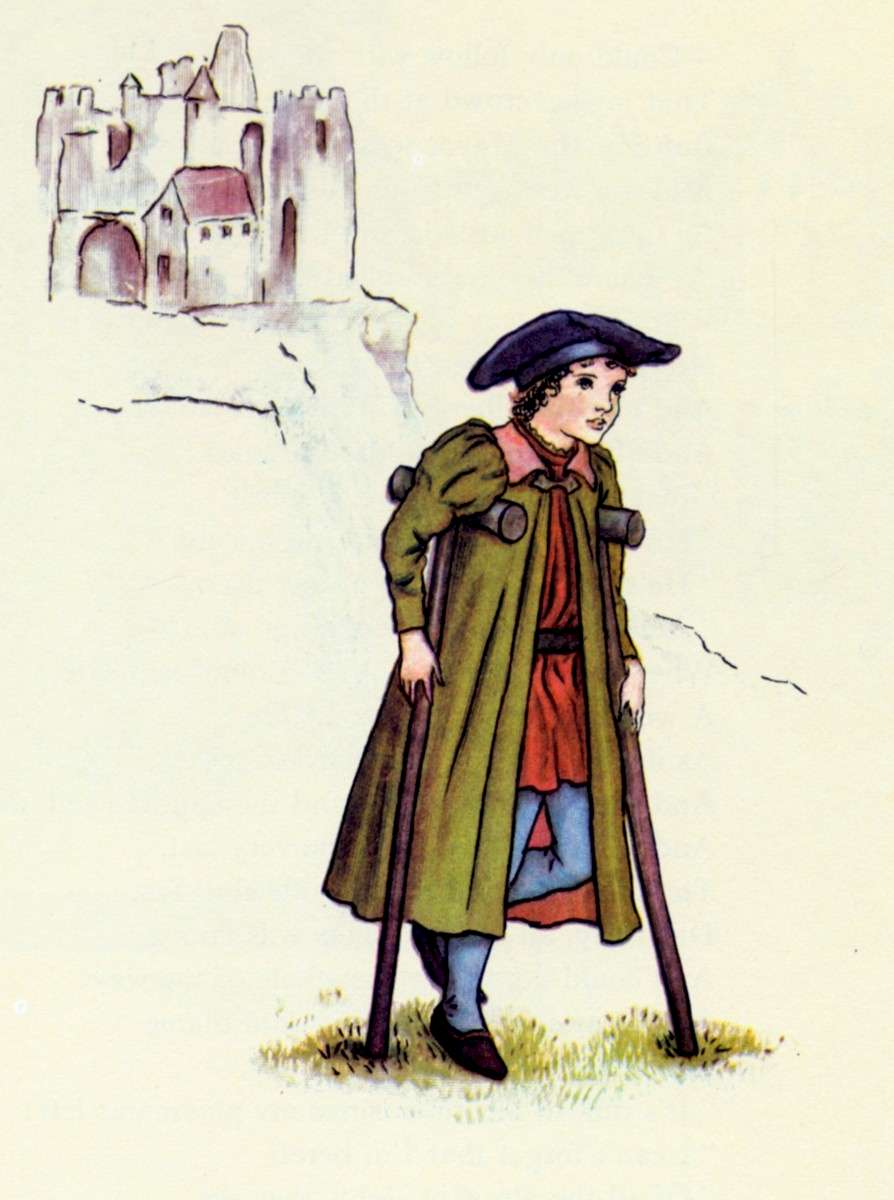
The Lame Child. A 19th-century illustration by Kate Greenaway for Robert Browning's "The Pied Piper of Hamelin"

=== Literature ===
- James Howell compared a version of the legend with recent events in London in a letter of 1643.
- In 1803, Johann Wolfgang von Goethe wrote a poem based on the story that was later set to music by Hugo Wolf. Goethe also incorporated references to the story in his version of Faust. (The first part of the drama was first published in 1808 and the second in 1832.)
- Jakob and Wilhelm Grimm, known as the Brothers Grimm, drawing from 11 sources, included the tale in their collection Deutsche Sagen (first published in 1816). According to their account, two children were left behind, as one was blind and the other lame, so neither could follow the others. The rest became the founders of Siebenbürgen (Transylvania).
- Robert Browning wrote a poem called "The Pied Piper of Hamelin", using the 1605 Verstegan version of the tale (the earliest account in English) and adopting the 1376 date. The poem was published in Browning's Dramatic Lyrics (1842). His retelling in verse is notable for its humour, wordplay, and jingling rhymes.
- Viktor Dyk's Krysař (The Rat-Catcher), published in 1915, retells the story in a slightly darker, more enigmatic way. The short novel also features the character of Faust.
- In Marina Tsvetaeva's long poem liricheskaia satira, The Rat-Catcher (serialized in the émigré journal Volia Rossii in 1925–1926), rats are an allegory of people influenced by Bolshevik propaganda.
- Shel Silverstein's poem "The One Who Stayed", published as part of his collection Where the Sidewalk Ends in 1974, tells the Pied Piper story from the point of view of a child who was too scared to follow him.
- Gloria Skurzynski's 1979 children's novel What Happened in Hamelin re-tells the Piped Piper story documenting the 1284 Hamelin events using research of medieval manuscripts, but gives the Piper an apprentice, a badly treated baker's servant, who discovers his new master's intended vengeance.
- "Emissary from Hamelin" is a short story written by Harlan Ellison, published in 1978 in the collection Strange Wine.
- The paperback horror novel Come, Follow Me by Philip Michaels (Avon Books, 1983) is based on the story.
- China Miéville's 1998 London-set novel King Rat centers on the ancient rivalry between the rats (some of whom are portrayed as having humanlike characteristics) and the Pied Piper, who appears in the novel as a mysterious musician named Pete who infiltrates the local club-music scene.
- Terry Pratchett's 2001 young-adult novel, The Amazing Maurice and His Educated Rodents, parodies the legend from the perspective of the rats, the piper and their handler. It was adapted as an CGI animated film released in 2022.
- The Piper is one of the three children of the architect in Garth Nix’s The Keys to the Kingdom series. One of the main characters in the novel. Suzy Turquoise Blue, is one of the children he led away.
- In 2011, Michael Morpurgo retold the story in a children's novel, The Pied Piper of Hamelin, illustrated by Emma Chichester Clark, with a social agenda twist.
- In 2014, Russell Brand's The Pied Piper of Hamelin was published by Atria Books (ISBN 978-1-4767-9189-0) as Book 1 of his Trickster Tales, setting the story in a more modern era and making some of the children as (and in some cases even more) repulsive as the adults. He also narrated the audiobook version (see below in "Audio").
- The short story "The Rat King" by John Connolly, first included in the 2016 edition of his novel The Book of Lost Things, is a fairly faithful adaptation of the legend, but with a new ending. It was adapted for BBC Radio 4 and first broadcast on 28 October 2016.
- Piper, a 2017 liberal adaptation of the original story into a Young Adult graphic novel written by Jay Asher and Jessica Freeburg and illustrated by Jeff Stokely, from Penguin imprint Razorbill.
- The Pied Piper is a central figure in Rainbow Valley and Rilla of Ingleside by Lucy Maud Montgomery, calling, or in hindsight luring, that generation of boys off to war.

"The Piper is coming nearer," he said, "he is nearer than he was that evening I saw him before. His long, shadowy cloak is blowing around him. He pipes—he pipes—and we must follow—Jem and Carl and Jerry and I—round and round the world. Listen—listen—can't you hear his wild music?"

- Matthew Cody has written a trilogy for young readers entitled The Secrets of the Pied Piper, consisting of The Peddler's Road (2015, ISBN 978-0385755283), The Magician's Key (2016, ISBN 978-0385755283) and The Piper's Apprentice (2017, ISBN 978-0385755306), telling the story of two siblings who, while visiting Hamelin with their father, are transported to the Summer Isle, where the original stolen Hamelin children (who have not aged a day) now live, and must find a way to escape back to the real world.
- In 2023, Knight Errant Press released The Child of Hameln by Max Turner (ISBN 978-1-9996713-9-6), a 1980s-set supernatural thriller and light horror, and a queer retelling of the Pied Piper tale. From the perspective of the child who was left behind by the piper, the novella explores themes of loneliness and belonging against a backdrop of small town horror, murder and political corruption.
- In 2024, Book 1: Hamelin, the first book in The Children of the Piper series by Peter Smart, was published by PiperHaus (ISBN 978-1-966158-01-1) and is a fully illustrated twist on the classic tale told from the point of view of 13-year-old Sofia Müller, a girl living in Hamelin at the time. Instead of asking for gold or silver to get rid of the town's rat infestation, the piper asks for a promise instead: because the adults of the town had not been treating the children very well, they must agree to start treating them as they wished they would have been treated when they were children themselves. A year later, after the townsfolk fail to keep their promise, the piper takes the children away.

=== Film ===
- The Pied Piper (1924), a combination live-action/animated silent short directed by and starring Walter Lantz and his cartoon creation "Dinky Doodle", putting the "Pied Piper" concept in a modern setting with an artist being constantly bothered by cartoon mice interrupting his work.
- The Pied Piper (16 September 1933) is a short animated film based on the story, produced by Walt Disney Productions, directed by Wilfred Jackson, and released as a part of Walt Disney's Silly Symphonies series. It stars the voice talents of Billy Bletcher as the Mayor of Hamelin.
- Pied Piper Porky (1939), starring Porky Pig, is a black-and-white Looney Tunes parody of the tale of the Pied Piper, in which one rat doesn't fall for Porky's tune and breaks his pipe, causing Porky to call upon a cat who's afraid of mice.
- The Pied Piper of Basin Street (1945), a Walter Lantz Swing Symphony cartoon transposing the Pied Piper story to a modern city, with the Piper playing a trombone (performed by Jack Teagarden) to lure away and capture all the rats and then after the Mayor cheats him luring away all the teenagers by impersonating "Hank Swoonatra".
- Paying the Piper (1949), starring Porky Pig, is a color Looney Tunes parody of the tale of the Pied Piper in which the cats aren't happy that Porky has rid the town of rats.
- The Pied Piper of Hamelin (1957), an American musical directed by Bretaigne Windust, starring Van Johnson, Claude Rains (in his only singing and dancing role), Lori Nelson, Jim Backus, and Kay Starr.
- The Pied Piper of Guadalupe (1961), starring Sylvester and Speedy Gonzales, is a color Looney Tunes parody of the tale of the Pied Piper in which Sylvester is inspired to imitate the Piper in order to catch all of the mice in town.
- The Pied Piper is a 1972 British film directed by Jacques Demy and starring Jack Wild, Donald Pleasence and John Hurt, featuring Donovan in the title role and Diana Dors.
- Pink Piper is a 1976 theatrical short starring The Pink Panther in which after "The Pink Piper" unsuccessfully tries to lead a mouse out of a villager's house, he then tries to save it when the villager tries to kill the mouse himself.
- The Pied Piper of Hamelin is a 1981 stop-motion animated film by Cosgrove Hall using Robert Browning's original poem verbatim, narrated by Robert Hardy. This adaptation was later shown as an episode for the PBS series Long Ago and Far Away.
- In 1986, Jiří Bárta made the animated movie Krysař (The Pied Piper) based more on the above-mentioned story by Viktor Dyk; the movie was accompanied by a score by Michael Kocáb.
- In Atom Egoyan's The Sweet Hereafter (1997), the legend of the Pied Piper is a metaphor for a town's failure to protect its children.
- In 2015, a South Korean horror movie, The Piper, was released. It is a loose adaptation of the Brothers Grimm tale where the Pied Piper uses the rats for his revenge to kill all the villagers except for the children whom he traps in a cave.
- In 2023, Erlingur Thoroddsen directed The Piper, a dark reimagining of the tale, starring Charlotte Hope, Julian Sands, Kate Nichols, Oliver Savell, Alexis Rodney, Philipp Christopher, Salomé Chandler, Aoibhe O'Flanagan, Louise Gold, Pippa Winslow, and Boyan Anev.
- Also in 2023, Anthony Waller directed Piper, another dark reimagining of the tale written by Waller and Duncan Kennedy, starring Elizabeth Hurley, Mia Jenkins, Jack Stewart, and Arben Bajraktaraj as The Piper.

=== Television ===
- Van Johnson starred as the Piper in NBC studios' adaptation: The Pied Piper of Hamelin (1957).
- In 1985 Robert Browning's poetic retelling of the story was adapted and directed by Nicholas Meyer as an episode of Shelley Duvall's Faerie Tale Theatre starring Eric Idle as both the Piper and Robert Browning in the prologue and epilogue narrating the poem to a young boy.
- Gloria Skurzynski's 1979 children's novel What Happened in Hamelin (see above in "Literature") was adapted as an episode of CBS Storybreak under the same title and released as the 3rd episode of Season 3 on 3 October 1987.
- The cast of Peanuts did their own version of the tale in the direct-to-DVD special It's the Pied Piper, Charlie Brown (2000), which was the final special to have the involvement of original creator Charles Schulz, who died before it was released.
- The 2003 television film The Electric Piper, set in the United States in the 1960s, depicts the piper as a psychedelic rock guitarist modeled after Jimi Hendrix.
- The Pied Piper of Hamelin was adapted in Happily Ever After: Fairy Tales for Every Child where it uses jazz music. The episode featured Wesley Snipes as the Pied Piper and the music performed by Ronnie Laws as well as the voices of Samuel L. Jackson as the Mayor of Hamelin, Grant Shaud as the Mayor's assistant Toadey, John Ratzenberger and Richard Moll as respective guards Hinky and Dinky.
- In The Sarah Jane Adventures the Pied Piper is a shapeshifting alien who manifests from people's fears.
- In the American TV series Once Upon a Time, the Pied Piper is revealed to be Peter Pan, who is using pipes to call out to "lost boys" and take them away from their homes.
- In the Netflix series The Society, a man named Pfeiffer removes a mysterious smell from the town of West Ham, but is not paid. Two days later he takes the kids on field trip in a school bus and returns them to an alternate version of the town where the adults are not present.
- In Teenage Mutant Ninja Turtles there is a villain called the Rat King who uses rats as troops; like the Pied Piper he uses a flute to charm them and even turns Master Splinter on his prized students.
- The HBO series Silicon Valley centers around a compression company called Pied Piper. The denouement of the series depicts the company as benevolent and self-sacrificing as opposed to the extortionist depiction in the fable. One of the characters refers to the company's eponymous inspiration as "a predatory flautist who murders children in a cave."
- The Grimm Variations, a 2024 Netflix anime series, features a retelling of the story, in which the Pied Piper is a visitor to an isolated village who introduces an illicit picture to a teacher, who uses it to try and seduce a student.
- Hameln, a 2024 German horror-themed TV series, tells the return of the Pied Piper after eight centuries, seeking revenge. Only descendants of the three surviving children, blind, deaf; lame can stop the piper's eerie army of the 130 dead children's souls.

=== Audio ===
- The Robert Browning poem has been recorded many times, with narrators including Boris Karloff, Gene Kelly, Ingrid Bergman, Peter Ustinov, Orson Welles, Peggy Ashcroft, Laurence Olivier, Anton Lesser and David Tennant.
- The Mickey Mouse Theater of the Air broadcast an adaptation on 13 March 1938.
- Columbia Workshop broadcast an adaptation on 21 July 1946 on CBS with Donald Ogden Stewart as the Narrator and Arthur Q. Bryan (the voice of "Elmer Fudd") as "The Mayor".
- Author's Playhouse broadcast an adaptation on 11 December 1944 on NBC.
- In 1963, the story was adapted as part of the Tale Spinners for Children vinyl record series (UAC 11017) along with an adaptation of Hans Christian Andersen's The Tinder Box.
- On 23 August 2000, The Amazing Ratman Story, written by David Sheasby, was broadcast on BBC Radio 4 as part of their Afternoon Play series, with Bernard Cribbins and Geraldine Fitzgerald. In this version of the Pied Piper story, set in a retirement home, an old man makes a deal with a television crew to tell them his tale about a piper, a mayor and a town plagued with rats. The radio play has since been rebroadcast several times on BBC Radio 7 and BBC Radio 4 Extra.
- A reading of John Connolly's story The Rat King (see the entry above in "Literature"), performed by Peter Marinker, was broadcast on BBC Radio 4 on 28 October 2016 and rebroadcast on BBC Radio 4 Extra on 20 and 21 January 2019.
- In 2014, Russell Brand narrated the audiobook version of his book The Pied Piper of Hamelin (see above in "Literature") for Simon & Schuster Audio.
- Shel Silverstein narrated his poem "The One Who Stayed" in the audiobook recording of his collection Where the Sidewalk Ends (see above in "Literature").

=== Music ===
- Karl Weigl composed a children's operetta The Pied Piper of Hamelin in 1934, with libretto by Helene Scheu-Riesz. Under the direction of Davide Casali, the Festival Viktor Ullmann mounted a dramatic performance of the operetta in 2021 in Italian rather than the original German.
- The 1959 album by Malvina Reynolds: 'Another Country Heard From' contains an original song about the Pied Piper.
- The 1966 pop song The Pied Piper, most notably recorded by Crispian St. Peters, is about the legend.
- In 1970, Nicolas Flagello composed the opera The Piper of Hamelin. In 1999, Newport Classics released a recording of a live performance of the opera performed by the Metropolitan School of Music Preparatory Division, featuring Sesame Street's Bob McGrath as the Narrator and Brace Negron as the Piper.
- In 1972, a musical version of the story titled The Pied Piper was released by EMI's Starline Records (SRS 5144) as part of the David Frost Presents series, a series of LPs featuring David Frost narrating fairytales and supported in song and vocal dramatization by famous British comedians of the 50s & 60s, with music by Roger Webb, lyrics by Norman Newell and featuring Doctor Who star Jon Pertwee as the Piper and Miriam Margolyes.
- In 1985, Harvey Shield's musical Hamelin: A Musical Tale from Rats to Riches, written with Richard Jarboe and Matthew Wells, was produced off-Broadway at the Circle in the Square Downtown Theatre in Greenwich Village, New York following initial productions at the Olio in Los Angeles and Musical Theater Works in New York, running for 33 performances. A recording was released in 2003 under the title The Pied Piper of Hamelin: A Musical.
- Karlheinz Stockhausen's 1988 opera Montag aus Licht (part of the seven-opera cycle Licht) includes a Kinderfänger (German for "child-catcher") or Pied Piper character.
- In 1989, W11 Opera premiered Koppelberg, an opera they commissioned from composer Steve Gray and lyricist Norman Brooke; the work was based on the Robert Browning poem.
- Demons and Wizards' first album, Demons and Wizards (2000), includes a track called "The Whistler" which recounts the tale of the Pied Piper.
- Colin Matthews collaborated with Michael Morpurgo on a version for narrators, children's choir and orchestra commissioned by the London Philharmonic Orchestra in 2014.
- In 2016, Victorian Opera presented The Pied Piper, an Opera by Richard Mills. At the Playhouse the Art Centre, Melbourne, Victoria, Australia.
- Pied Piper is a song by South Korean boy group BTS. It was released in 2017 and appears on the album Love Yourself: Her.
- The Pied Piper, an opera in one act based on the poem with additional material by Adam Cornford with music by Daniel Steven Crafts.
- Ratcatcher, a 2022 song by Gwar, has Gwar's lead singer take credit for being the Piper and stealing the children when their bill went unpaid.

=== Other ===
- The Town on the Edge of the End, a comic-book version, was published by Walt Kelly in his 1954 Pogo collection Pogo Stepmother Goose.
- The 1995 video game Piper is a Western re-telling of the original legend of the Pied Piper.
- In the anime adaptation of the Japanese light novel series, Problem Children Are Coming from Another World, Aren't They? (2013), a major story revolves around the "false legend" of Pied Piper of Hamelin. The adaptation speaks in great length about the original source and the various versions of the story that sprang up throughout the years. It is stated that Weser, the representation of Natural Disaster, was the true Piper of Hamelin (meaning the children were killed by drowning or landslides).

== Allusions in linguistics ==
In linguistics, pied-piping is the common name for the ability of question words and relative pronouns to drag other words along with them when brought to the front, as part of the phenomenon called Wh-movement. For example, in "For whom are the pictures?", the word "for" is pied-piped by "whom" away from its declarative position ("The pictures are for me"), and in "The mayor, pictures of whom adorn his office walls" both words "pictures of" are pied-piped in front of the relative pronoun, which normally starts the relative clause.

Some researchers believe that the tale has inspired the common English phrase "pay the piper", meaning to pay one's debts (or, metaphorically, face the consequences of one's decisions) rather than attempting to evade them. However, the phrase "pay the piper" may also be a contraction of the English proverb "he who pays the piper calls the tune." This proverb, in contrast to the modern interpretation of paying a debt, suggests that the person who bears the financial responsibility for something also has the right to determine how it should be carried out.

== Modernity ==
The present-day city of Hamelin continues to maintain information about the Pied Piper legend and possible origins of the story on its website. Interest in the city's connection to the story remains so strong that, in 2009, Hamelin held a tourist festival to mark the 725th anniversary of the disappearance of the town's earlier children. The Rat Catcher's House is popular with visitors, although it bears no connection to the Rat-Catcher version of the legend. Indeed, the Rattenfängerhaus is instead associated with the story due to the earlier inscription upon its facade mentioning the legend. The house was built much later, in 1602 and 1603. It is now a Hamelin City-owned restaurant with a Pied Piper theme throughout. The city also maintains an online shop with rat-themed merchandise as well as offering an officially licensed Hamelin Edition of the popular board game Monopoly which depicts the legendary Piper on the cover.

In addition to the recent milestone festival, each year the city marks 26 June as "Rat Catcher's Day". In the United States, a similar holiday for exterminators based on Rat Catcher's Day is marked on 22 July, but has not caught on.

== See also ==
- Hamelen (TV series)
- Hamline University, whose mascot is the Pied Piper
- List of literary accounts of the Pied Piper
