= Johannes de Lüde =

Dean of Hamelin

Johannes de Lüde (also known as Johann von Lüde, John of Lude and Johannis de Lüde) was dean of Hamelin. His mother was an eyewitness to the children being lured out of the town by the Pied Piper of Hamelin.

Johannes de Lüde had an uncle named Johannes von Reymbertink, mentioned in his will, so it could have been a young Fräulein von Reymbertink who watched the children being led away on the Feast Day of Saints John and Paul, 26 June 1284. Heinrich Spanuth speculates that she may have been 10–14 years old.

National Geographic Portugal writes that:

According to the book of notarial documents in the historical archive of Hamelin, the Lüde family was one of the most active in the city's business

Johannes de Lüde, decanus ecclesiae hamelensis, left a rich inheritance in 1378, consisting of jewellery, house furniture and vessels of silver, iron and wood, as well as Hamelin dinars. The value is given in the measurement of talent, and his bequests were worth over 150 talents, amongst them 10 talents to the building of the glorious Church of St. Bonifatius, 10 talents to the dormitory and 20 talents to the poor, of which 8 solidi (i.e., about 1/18,000th of the total) were to be used for bread and the rest for lights for the holy sacraments.

He is also mentioned in the 1374 or 1384 Chronica Ecclesiae Hamelensis.
