= Toto: The Dog-Gone Amazing Story of the Wizard of Oz =

2017 British children's novel

- First edition cover
- Author: Michael Morpurgo
- Audio read by: Christopher Ragland
- Illustrator: Emma Chichester Clark
- Cover artist: Emma Chichester Clark
- Language: English
- Genre: Fantasy; adventure; children's novel
- Publisher: HarperCollins
- Publication date: 7 September 2017
- Publication place: United Kingdom
- Media type: Print
- Pages: 284
- ISBN: 978-0-00-813459-4 Hardback
- OCLC: 1392015043

Toto: The Dog-Gone Amazing Story of the Wizard of Oz is a children's fantasy and adventure novel written by Michael Morpurgo, and illustrated by Emma Chichester Clark. It was first published in the United Kingdom by HarperCollins in 2017. The novel retells L. Frank Baum's 1900 novel The Wonderful Wizard of Oz through the eyes of Dorothy's dog Toto. The book was to be adapted into an animated musical feature film with Alex Timbers directing the project.

== Synopsis ==
Papa Toto likes to tell his litter of puppies the story of his adventure with his faithful companion Dorothy.

I was there Papa Toto said, and those magic words sent shivers down my spine. It was going to be the Wizard story. Dorothy and me were both there. We were all silent, snuggled up together, waiting, waiting. Then Papa Toto began. —Tiny Toto

According to Papa Toto, he was out chasing Uncle Henry's hat, which had blown off his head in the huge wind gusts, and Dorothy was out chasing him, which is why he and Dorothy weren't in the cellar with the rest of the family when the tornado descended on their farm in Kansas. The pair scramble back to the farmhouse, and it ends up getting swept up in the twister, and they are dumped unceremoniously in the mysterious land of Oz, accidentally landing on the Wicked Witch of the East. Their first encounter in the strange land is with the Munchkins. After telling them of their desire to get back home, the Munchkins inform the pair they must travel on the yellow brick road to Emerald City and consult with the Wizard of Oz, who can possibly help them return home to Kansas.

Along the way to Emerald City, they meet up with a series of unique characters on the yellow brick road: a scarecrow who is convinced he has no brains, a tin man without a heart, and a cowardly lion. According to Papa Toto, he is the one who decides they can trust the Scarecrow, because he likes the smell of him; he is the one who sniffs out the metallic scent of the Tin Man; and he proceeds to protect Dorothy from the Lion. Believing the Wizard may be able to help them as well, Dorothy invites them to accompany her and Papa Toto. When they all arrive at Emerald City, and finally meet the Wizard, they hear his booming voice, but can not see him. Papa Toto is the one who knocks over a screen to reveal the true identity of the Wizard. After pleading their case, the Wizard is able to solve the problems of the three characters, and he advises Dorothy if she wants to get back home, all she has to do is take Papa Toto in her arms, click her heels together three times, and wish to return home. Instantly, she begins to rapidly whirl through the air, landing back in Kansas, where she rushes to the farmhouse, and runs to Aunt Em, saying I'm so glad to be home again!

== Background ==
Morpurgo says the idea to write the book came from his frequent collaborator, illustrator Emma Chichester Clark, and his publisher Ann-Janine Murtagh. He said that he initially abstained from writing the book, because it was "never one of his favourite films". He found "some of the skipping and some of the songs really irritating", and he had actually never read the book. He recalls that Clark kept nudging him about the proposal, and "wouldn’t leave it alone". So he decided to read the book for the first time, and says "I didn't realise what I had been missing all these years". After finishing the book, he thought Toto had "little to no real part in the story", and he agreed to write the novel so Toto could "tell the story in his own voice".

== Reviews ==
Emily Bearn wrote in pp, the Munchkins, the Yellow Brick Road – is rebranded in Morpurgo's familiar, seamlessly readable prose. Morpurgo's style is very different to Baum's lyricism. But his great skill is his ability to tell complex stories in simple, chatty language, which is exactly what he manages here".

Diana Barnes of the School Librarian notes "that Morpurgo's novel is faithful to the original book where it is Toto who knocks over a screen in the Emerald City to reveal the reality of the Wizard of Oz, but he keeps the film's version of the red shoes that Dorothy gains from the Wicked Witch of the East, not silver as in the book". She also complimented Emma Chichester Clark's illustrations as "plentiful and fun", and overall she concludes that "this is a glossy and very beautiful book. It is good to read the well-known story from another point of view".

Mariko Turk wrote in The Horn Book Guide that the novel's "familiar scenes from the classic tale remain, interspersed with Toto's amusing asides, and Emma Chichester Clark's double-page, single-page, and vignette illustrations bring the humor and wonder of Oz to life". He further opined that the book "should please both fans of the movie and Baum devotees". The Irish Independent said it was a "clever version of The Wizard of Oz", and "the illustrations are gently coloured, bringing this adventure tale to vivid life for younger readers".

== Cancelled film adaptation ==
In July 2018, Warner Animation Group announced they would produce an animated film based on the book. In February 2021, animation studio Animal Logic announced that Toto would be their next project, and it would be a musical adaption of the book. Alex Timbers was tapped to direct the feature; John August was brought on board as the screenwriter; Jared Stern would serve as executive producer, and Derek Frey would produce the film. The film was originally scheduled to be theatrically released on February 2, 2024 in the United States. On April 5, 2023, it was pushed off the 2024 release schedule with The Alto Knights 2022 taking over its original release date, which also moved off that date by October 2023. On June 28, 2025, animator Uli Meyer posted on Instagram - the later-edited post reading "A few years ago I worked on a project that was tremendous fun. A lot of talented artists were involved. It was one of those where you throw hundreds of designs into the pot and everything is great but nothing is ever followed up. Then it suddenly stopped. The people you were talking to on a weekly basis were never heard from again. Recently, many years later, I heard that the project is dead. Many of us have been there and for me this isn't the only one." Character designer Tona Grasa replied to the post the same day, saying that he "worked on this project along some amazing designers at Animal Logic after this. We were on this rollercoaster of a dream project for about two years until the project got put "on hold". We were always in awe of what all you wonderful artists did for the reproduction! A real shame the project will never see the light of day.", later replying to his reply with "preproduction" the same day.

== See also ==
- List of works by Michael Morpurgo
- List of fictional dogs
- Toto
