= Teachers Pay Teachers =

Online marketplace

Teachers Pay Teachers (sometimes abbreviated as TPT) is an online marketplace and an American educational website for buying and selling educator resources. It focuses on a PreK-12 audience. Founded in 2006 by Paul Edelman, a former New York City public school teacher, Teachers Pay Teachers has over 2.6 million active users with sales exceeding $60 million. In 2012, Teachers Pay Teachers revealed that a teacher has made over $1 million in profit from the marketplace. 10 years later in 2022, it announced that there are more than 300 teachers that have gone on to earn at least $1 million in profit from Teachers Pay Teachers.

Teachers Pay Teachers was acquired by IXL Learning on March 2, 2023.

Teachers Pay Teachers has incorporated other products, such as Easel by TPT, into its core functionality. Easel is an interactive lesson creator and LMS (Learning Management System) for teaching and assessing students.
