= Keila Vall de la Ville =

Venezuelan author (born 1974)

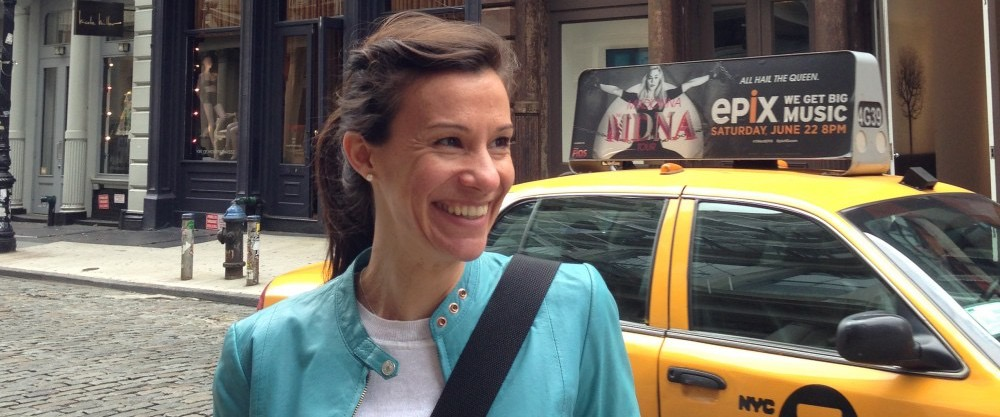
- Born: 19 February 1974 (age 52); Caracas, Venezuela
- Occupation: Writer
- Notable work: Ana no duerme (2007), Los días animales (2016), Ana no duerme y otros cuentos (2016), Viaje Legado (2016).
- Website: https://www.keilavall.com/

Keila Vall de la Ville (born in Caracas, Venezuela on February 19, 1974) is a Venezuelan author living in the United States. She is the author the 2016 novel Los días animales (2016) which received the International Latino Book Awards for Best Novel in 2018 and has been translated into English as The Animal Days (2021). Vall de la Ville's 2007 short story collection Ana no duerme (2007) was finalist in Venezuela's Concurso Nacional de Autores Inéditos. She has published the poetry book Viaje legado (2016), the short story collection Ana no duerme y otros cuentos (2016) and has edited the forthcoming anthology Between the Breath and the Abyss: Poetics on Beauty, a compilation of essays and poems by thirty-three contemporary poets on the subject of Beauty. Her fiction and non-fiction work is included in several anthologies. She collaborates with El Nacional's Papel Literario del Diario El Nacional, Viceversa Magazine and Prodavinci, among other digital media.

She is an anthropologist with an MA in politics from Universidad Simon Bolivar, an MA in cultural studies from Columbia University. She won a silver medal at the Rock Climbing Pan-American Championship in 1996, and was one of the three climbers of the first all-female attempt to the Mount Roraima.

== Career ==
Vall de la Ville was born in Caracas and grew up in a family of writers and filmmakers. When she was six her family moved to Florence, Italy. There she completed the seconda e terza elementare, before moving back to Venezuela.

While pursuing her BA in anthropology at the Universidad Central de Venezuela she won a silver medal at the Rock Climbing Panamerican Championship (Copa Alpina, Bogotá 1996) and was one of the three climbers of the first all-female attempt to Tepui Roraima (1998), one of the ancient geological formations of the Guyana Shield (border between Venezuela, Colombia and Brazil). After a tropical rain that changed the physical conditions of the wall, the team realized they couldn't finish the ascent. Weather and exhaustion prevented them from a second attempt. She has also climbed in the US, South of France, Thailand, Colombia and Peru.

In 2003 Vall de la Ville completed an MA in political science at Caracas’ Universidad Simon Bolivar. Her thesis involved a research study on the political values and practices of Chaguaramas de Loero, a small community in the northeast Venezuelan coast.

In 2006 her first short story book Ana no duerme was finalist in the Concurso Nacional de Autores Inéditos Monte Ávila Editores.

She moved to New York in 2011 to pursue her writing career. While there she completed an MFA in creative writing at NYU. After finishing the award-winning novel Los días animales, her first poetry book Viaje legado, and her short story book Ana no duerme y otros cuentos, she pursued an MA in Hispanic cultural studies in Columbia University.

Her second short story collection, Enero es el mes más largo; la antología poética bilingüe, Entre el aliento y el precipicio: poéticas sobre la belleza / Between the Breath and the Abyss: Poetics on Beauty; así como The Animal Days, will be published in 2021.

== Cultural activism ==
Keila Vall de la Ville is the founder of the Venezuelan poetry movement Jamming Poético. Since 2011 Jamming Poético has staged readings and conversations around Venezuelan and US Latino poetry in Caracas, Miami, New York City, Bogotá, and online. Jamming Poético has gathered the work of hundreds of key authors from Latin America and the US and resulted in one anthology, 102 Poetas Jamming, in two volumes (next volume forthcoming).

Her advocacy of Venezuelan poetry around the world, and the role of Spanish-language fiction in the US Latino literary movement, has made her a reference in the Venezuelan and US contemporary Hispanic literature.

Keila Vall de la Ville has been invited to Miami Book Fair Miami Book Fair for her book presentations, as a reader online and as a writing instructor in short workshops. She has also participated at The America's Poetry Festival of New York, Latino Poets New York Festival Feria Internacional del Libro de la Ciudad de Nueva York, Festival del Libro Hispano de Virginia, Kerouak Festival, Festival de poesía Galápagos Contracorriente, Feria International del Libro de la Universidad de Carabobo and Se buscan poetas at the emblematic Bowery Poetry Club in New York.

== Works ==
=== As author ===
Short-story

- Ana no duerme (2007) Finalist in Venezuela's Concurso Nacional de Autores Inéditos 2006.
- Ana no duerme y otros cuentos (2016)
- Enero es el mes más largo (2021)

Novels

- Los Días Animales (2016) (International Latino Book Award. Best Novel Drama / Adventure, 2018)
- The Animal Days (2021) (traducción de Robin Myers)

Poetry

- Viaje Legado (2016)

Essays

- Antolín Sánchez, discurso en movimiento: del pixel, al cuadro, a la secuencia (2016)

=== As editor ===
- 102 Poetas Jamming (2014)
- Entre el aliento y el precipicio: poéticas sobre la belleza / Between the Breath and the Abyss: Poetics on Beauty, editora (2021)

== Awards ==
- Concurso Nacional de Autores Inéditos Monte Ávila Editores, 2006. Categoría: Narrativa por Ana no duerme
- International Latino Book Awards, 2018. Categoría: Best Novel Drama/Adventure por Los Días Animales
