= International Latino Book Awards =

The International Latino Book Awards (ILBA) are the largest and longest running awards show honoring books written by or about Latinos. Founded in 1997, the ILBA is listed as a 501(c)(3) nonprofit organization headquartered in Carlsbad, California. The awards are given to authors, translators, and illustrators for books written in English, Spanish, or Portuguese, covering children's, fiction and non-fiction books.

The awards are produced by Empowering Latino Futures, formerly Latino Literacy Now, an organization co-founded by the actor Edward James Olmos, Kirk Whisler, and by REFORMA, the National Association to Promote Library & Information Services to Latinos and the Spanish Speaking (an affiliate to the ALA, American Library Association). Other organizations associated with the ILBA include Las Comadres para Las Americas, Reforma, Los Angeles City College, Los Angeles Community College District, American Library Association, Hispanic Heritage Literature Organization, El Latino San Diego, Education Begins in the Home, International Society of Latino Authors, and the Latino 247 Media Group. The awards aim to celebrate Latino literary and scholarly production and create a wider awareness of it.

Awards are distributed on-site at an annual ceremony. Within each category, gold, silver and bronze medals are awarded, as well as honorable mentions. Winners receive a medal and a certificate in recognition of their achievement. In 2023, the event received over 4,000 participation entries. The judging panel is composed of more than 200 individuals, whose identities are kept confidential. The 2026 award winners were announced in early October.

== Past award winners ==
- Rodolfo Acuña
- Lori Flores (historian)
- Omar Valerio-Jiménez (historian)
- Isabel Allende
- Gloria Amescua (2022)
- Rudolfo Anaya
- Rocky Barilla
- Ruth Behar (2022)
- Joseph Cassara
- Daína Chaviano
- Denise Chavez
- Paulo Coelho
- Carlos E. Cortés (2017 Honorable Mention in Poetry)
- Oscar Hijuelos
- Alejandro L. Madrid
- Demetria Martinez
- Eduardo Moga
- Ana Nogales
- Victor Paz Otero
- Cynthia Pelayo (2021 Gold Medal /Mystery for Children of Chicago)
- Erik Perezbrain (2023 Honorable Mention for Mariposa Award)
- Raquel V. Reyes (2023 Gold Medal /Mystery )
- Francine Rodriguez
- Rudy Ruiz
- Alberto Sanchez Alvarez
- Nery Santos Gómez
- Sergio Troncoso
- Mario Vargas Llosa
- Alfredo Toro Hardy
- Antonieta Villamil
- Emanuel Xavier
- Keila Vall de la Ville (2018 Best Novel)
