= Emma Chichester Clark =

British children's book illustrator and author

- Born: 15 October 1955 (age 70)
- Education: Chelsea School of Art; Royal College of Art
- Occupations: Illustrator; author
- Parent(s): Robin Chichester-Clark; Jane Helen Goddard
- Writing career
- Genre: Children's literature
- Notable awards: Mother Goose Award (1988)
- Website: emmachichesterclark.co.uk

Emma Chichester Clark (born 15 October 1955) is a British children's book illustrator and author. She has published over 60 books and is best known for her series of picture books about a child's toy called Blue Kangaroo.

== Life ==
Daughter of Robin Chichester-Clark and Jane Helen Goddard, Chichester Clark studied graphic design at Chelsea Art School in the 1970s. After two years working in a design studio, she studied illustration under Quentin Blake at the Royal College of Art. Her book Listen to this won the 1988 Mother Goose Award for best newcomer.

== Works ==
=== Written and illustrated ===
- “Catch That Hat”, 1988
- Listen to this, 1987.
- Piper, 1995.
- Little Miss Muffet counts to ten, 1997.
- I love you, Blue Kangaroo!, 1998.
- It was you, Blue Kangaroo!, 2001
- Where are you, Blue Kangaroo!, 2002
- What shall we do, Blue Kangaroo?, 2002
- No more kissing!, 2002.
- Up in heaven, 2004.
- Will and Squill, 2005.
- Goldilocks and the three bears, 2010.

=== Illustrated ===
- Boo! stories to make you jump by Laura Cecil. 1990.
- The minstrel and the dragon pup by Rosemary Sutcliff. 1993.
- Greek myths by Geraldine McCaughrean. 1993.
- Greek gods and goddesses by Geraldine McCaughrean. 1993.
- Too tired by Ann Turnbull. 1993.
- The frog princess by Laura Cecil. 1995.
- Something rich and strange : a treasury of Shakespeare's verse. 1005.
- Roman myths by Geraldine McCaughrean. 1998.
- Puss in Boots and other cat tales by Montena Mondadori. 2001.
- Not last night but the night before by Colin McNaughton. 2009.
- The Orchard Book of Grimm's Fairy Tales by Saviour Pirotta. 2011
- The Pied Piper of Hamelin 2011
- Toto: The Dog-Gone Amazing Story of the Wizard of Oz 2017
- Time and the clockmice etcetera by Peter Dickinson
