= Rodrigo Blanco Calderón =

Venezuelan writer (born 1981)

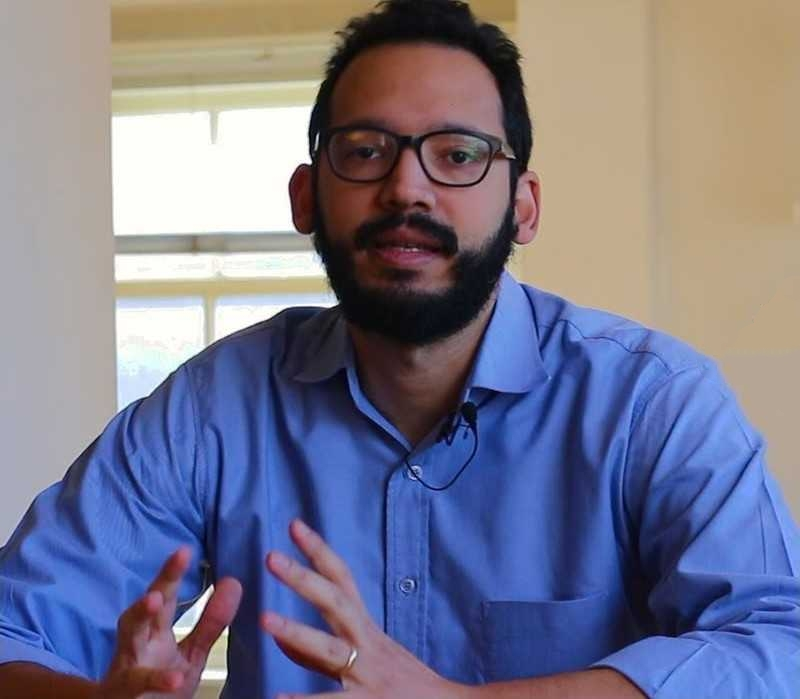
- Born: 1981 (age 44–45); Caracas, Venezuela
- Occupation: Short story writer

Rodrigo Blanco Calderón (born 1981) is a Venezuelan writer from Caracas. He completed his doctorate in literature and linguistics from Paris XIII University with a dissertation on the work of his literary mentor, Venezuelan writer Juan Carlos Méndez Guédez. He has published several collections of stories, among them Una larga fila de hombres, Los Invencibles, Las rayas and Los terneros. He has also published two novels, The Night (Seven Stories Press, 2022) and Simpatía (Seven Stories Press, 2024), both translated into English by Daniel Hahn and Noel Hernández González. A translation of his short story 'Payaso' (Clown) appears in the anthology Crude Words: Contemporary Writing from Venezuela (Ragpicker Press, 2016).

In 2007, he was named as one of the Bogota39, a list of the best young writers in Latin America. In 2013, he participated in the International Writing Program at the University of Iowa. He currently lives in Málaga.

== Awards ==
- 2019 – Premio Bienal de Novela Mario Vargas Llosa for The Night
- 2018 – Premio de la Crítica 2016-2017 for The Night
- 2017 – Finalista del V Premio Narrativa Breve Ribera del Duero for Los terneros
- 2016 – Premio Rive Gauche à Paris du Livre Étranger for The Night
- 2007 – LXI Concurso Anual de Cuentos del diario El Nacional for the story "Los golpes de la vida"
- 2005 – Premio en el concurso de autores inéditos de la editorial Monte Ávila for Una fila de hombres. Monte Ávila is a public publishing house dependent of the National Ministry of Culture of the Bolivarian Republic of Venezuela.
