= Prodavinci =

- Website type: News site
- Available in: Spanish
- Owner: Angel Alayón
- Website: www.prodavinci.com
- Registration: None
- Users: +1.0 million
- Launched: 2009
- Current status: Active

Prodavinci is a Venezuelan news site that provides analysis from historians, scholars and scientists. Foreign Policy called Prodavinci "a one-stop shop for Spanish-language analysis of the Venezuelan reality" while The Wall Street Journal described the website as having "serious political analysis".

== History ==
In 2009, Angel Alayón, a Venezuelan economist out of the University of Chicago, created a personal blog and decided it needed more content, stating "I would read things in the New Yorker, or the Atlantic, or Slate, and I would wonder why Venezuela couldn’t have something like that". Soon after, friends and the intellectual elite in Caracas began to show desire on posting on his blog, with Alayón then naming his blog "Prodavinci" as a "reference to DaVinci" and as "a call for a 'renaissance' of ideas in the country". Alayón describes Prodavinci as "a space for ideas, discussions and debates" though he doesn't want the website to be "a regular opinion page", saying:

"I always tell my writers that ‘opinion sucks,’ and what I mean is that in Venezuela, what passes as ‘opinion’ is not solid because it is not well-grounded. People can have an opinion, but they need to argue their points, not just state them".

Venezuelan journalist and author Boris Muñoz was one of the first to join Prodavinci while Willy McKey is the assistant editor. Contributors have included fiction writer and essayist Federico Vegas as well as constitutional lawyer José Ignacio Hernández.

== Reception ==
According to media protection organizations, Venezuelans "have been forced to find alternatives as newspapers and broadcasters struggle with state efforts to control coverage", with a growing trend of Venezuelans using online news media to bypass government censors. When Prodavinci was launched in 2009, only dozens of visitors viewed the website. By 2014, Prodavinci saw greater than double the monthly viewers with 239,000 visitors in September 2014. In June 2015, the website was then receiving "several million hits per month".

On 2 March 2022 Prodavinci received the King of Spain International Journalism Award in the category of International Cooperation and Humanitarian Action for their investigation "La promesa rota: el colapso de la seguridad social" (Spanish: The broken promise: the collapse of the social security system).

== See also ==
- Efecto Cocuyo
- La Patilla
- El Pitazo
- List of newspapers in Venezuela
