= List of Guggenheim Fellowships awarded in 2004 =

This is the list of Guggenheim Fellowships awarded in 2004.

== U.S. and Canadian Fellows ==
- Thomas A. Abercrombie, Associate Professor of Anthropology, New York University: Social-climbing, self-narrative, and modernity in the Spanish transatlantic world, 1550–1808.
- Amir D. Aczel, Science Writer, Brookline, Massachusetts: Descartes' missing notebook and the beginnings of modern mathematics.
- Qianshen Bai, Assistant Professor of Chinese Art, Boston University: Wu Dacheng and the modern fate of Chinese literati art.
- Mary Jo Bang, Poet, St. Louis, Missouri: Associate Professor of English, Washington University in St. Louis: Poetry.
- Stuart Banner, Professor of Law, University of California, Los Angeles: Law, power, and American Indian land loss.
- Uta Barth, Photographer, Los Angeles; Professor of Studio Art, University of California, Riverside: Photography.
- Howell S. Baum, Professor of Urban Studies and Planning, University of Maryland, College Park: Racial beliefs, liberalism, and school civil-rights policy.
- Thomas W. Baumgarte, Professor of Physics, Bowdoin College; Adjunct Assistant Professor of Physics, University of Illinois at Urbana-Champaign: Computer simulations of gravitational waves.
- Lucian A. Bebchuk, William J. Friedman and Alicia Townsend Friedman Professor of Law, Economics, and Finance, Harvard University Law School: The allocation of power between management and shareholders.
- Christopher I. Beckwith, Professor of Central Eurasian Studies, Indiana University: A history of central Eurasia.
- Jason David BeDuhn, Associate Professor of Religious Studies, Northern Arizona University: Augustine's Manichaeism and the making of Western Christianity.
- Ruth Ben-Ghiat, Associate Professor of Italian Studies and History, New York University: Italian prisoners of war and the transition from dictatorship.
- Neil Berger, Artist, Alpine, New York: Painting.
- Bill Berkeley, Writer, New York City; Adjunct Professor of International Affairs, Columbia University: The Iran hostage crisis.
- Constance Hoffman Berman, Professor of History, University of Iowa: Women's work and European economic expansion, 1050–1250.
- Kenneth M. Bilby, Independent Scholar, Rhinebeck, New York; Rockefeller Resident Fellow, Columbia College Chicago: Jamaican musical ethnography.
- Eric Bogosian, Playwright, New York City: Play writing.
- Carles Boix, Associate Professor of Political Science, University of Chicago: The emergence of party democracy in advanced countries, 1880–1930.
- Gideon Bok, Artist, Northampton, Massachusetts; Assistant Professor of Art, Hampshire College: Painting.
- Michael P. Brenner, Gordon McKay Professor of Applied Mathematics and Applied Physics, Harvard University: Mathematical models in developmental biology.
- Margaret Brouwer, Composer, Cleveland Heights, Ohio; Vincent K. and Edith H. Smith Chair in Composition and Department Head, Cleveland Institute of Music: Music composition.
- Mary Ellen Brown, Professor of Folklore and Ethnomusicology, Indiana University: The making of Francis James Child's Ballads.
- Stephen B. Brush, Professor of Human and Community Development, University of California, Davis: The cultural contours of maize in contemporary Mexico.
- Linda Goode Bryant, Film Maker, New York City: Film making.
- Felipe C. Cabello, Professor of Microbiology and Immunology, New York Medical College: Public-health implications of antibiotic use in aquaculture.
- Cameron D. Campbell, Associate Professor of Sociology and vice-chairman and Director of Graduate Studies, University of California, Los Angeles: Social and family change in Liaoning, 1850-2000 (in collaboration with James Lee).
- Huai-Dong Cao, A. Everett Pitcher Professor of Mathematics, Lehigh University: The Ricci flow on Kaehler manifolds.
- Judith A. Carney, Professor of Geography, University of California, Los Angeles: Africa's botanical heritage in the Atlantic world.
- Mary Carruthers, Dean for Humanities, Faculty of Arts and Science, and Erich Maria Remarque Professor of Literature, New York University: Aesthetic theory, medicine, and persuasion in the later Middle Ages.
- Zeynep Çelik-Butler, Professor of Architecture, New Jersey Institute of Technology: Architecture and the city in the Middle East and North Africa, 1830–1914.
- H. Perry Chapman, Professor of Art History, University of Delaware; Editor-in-Chief, The Art Bulletin: The painter's place in the Dutch Republic, 1604–1718.
- Susan Choi, Writer, Brooklyn, New York; Lecturer in the Council of the Humanities and Creative Writing, Princeton University: Fiction.
- Robert Clark, Writer, Seattle, Washington: Essays on art, belief, and Italy.
- Matthew Coolidge, Artist, Culver City, California; Director, Center for Land Use Interpretation, Culver City: New media art.
- Erin Cosgrove, Artist, Los Angeles; Adjunct Professor of Art History, West Los Angeles Community College: Installation art.
- Edwin A. Cowen, Associate Professor and Director, DeFrees Hydraulics Laboratory, Cornell University: Swash-zone turbulence and sediment transport.
- Daniel Cox, Professor of Physics, University of California, Davis: Studies in theoretical biological physics.
- Alvin Curran, Composer, Rome, Italy; Milhaud Professor of Music Composition, Mills College: Music composition.
- Jane Dailey, Associate Professor of History, Johns Hopkins University: Sex and civil rights in America.
- Panagiota Daskalopoulos, Professor of Mathematics, Columbia University: Studies in nonlinear diffusion equations.
- Peter Ho Davies, Writer, Ann Arbor, Michigan; Associate Professor of English and Director, MFA Program, University of Michigan: Fiction.
- Olena Kalytiak Davis, Poet, Anchorage, Alaska: Poetry.
- Joan Dayan, Professor of English and Comparative Literature, University of Pennsylvania: Slavery, incarceration, and the law of persons.
- Toi Derricotte, Poet, Pittsburgh, Pennsylvania; Professor of English, University of Pittsburgh: Poetry.
- Stuart Dischell, Poet, Greensboro, North Carolina; Associate Professor of English, University of North Carolina, Greensboro: Poetry.
- Eugene Walter Domack, Professor of Geology, Hamilton College: A study of the snowball-earth hypothesis.
- Henry John Drewal, Evjue-Bascom Professor of Art History and Afro-American Studies, University of Wisconsin–Madison: The senses in understandings of African art.
- Jenny Dubnau, Artist, Jackson Heights, New York: Painting.
- Jason Eckardt, Composer, New York City; Lecturer in Music Composition, Northwestern University: Music composition.
- Marty Ehrlich, Composer and Performer, New York City: Music composition.
- Susan L. Einbinder, Professor of Hebrew Literature, Hebrew Union College, Cincinnati: Poetry and history in medieval Jewish literature from Provence.
- Kenneth Feingold, Artist, New York: Sculpture.
- Robert Fenz, Film Maker, Allston, Massachusetts; Personal Assistant to Robert Gardner, Film Studies Center, Harvard University: Film making.
- Paola Ferrario, Photographer, Warwick, Rhode Island; Associate Professor of Art, Rhode Island College: Photography.
- Nicholas Fisher, Professor, Marine Sciences Research Center, State University of New York at Stony Brook: Metal biomagnification in contrasting marine food-chains.
- Talya Fishman, Associate Professor of Religious Studies, University of Pennsylvania: The inscription of Oral Torah and the formation of Jewish culture in the Middle Ages.
- Daniel E. Fleming, Professor of Hebrew and Judaic Studies, New York University: Israel's inland heritage.
- Angus J. S. Fletcher, Distinguished Professor Emeritus of English and Comparative Literature, The Graduate School, City University of New York: Temporal representations in poems of the environment.
- Neil Fligstein, Class of 1939 Chancellor's Professor, University of California, Berkeley: The process of Europeanization.
- Wayne Franklin, Davis Distinguished Professor of American Literature, Northeastern University: A biography of James Fenimore Cooper.
- Ann Eden Gibson, Professor of Art History, University of Delaware: Hale Woodruff's diasporic images.
- John G. Gibson, Independent Researcher and Writer, Judique, Nova Scotia; Research Associate in Celtic Studies, St. Francis Xavier University, Antigonish, Nova Scotia: The history and significance of Cape Breton Gaelic step-dancing.
- Roger Gilbert, Professor of English, Cornell University: The life and art of A. R. Ammons.
- Brad Gooch, Writer, New York City; Professor of English, William Paterson University: A biography of Flannery O'Connor.
- Fritz Graf, Professor of Greek and Latin, Ohio State University: Festivals in cities of the Greek East during the Roman imperial epoch.
- Greg Grandin, Assistant Professor of History, New York University: The United States in Latin America during the Cold War.
- Mac Keith Griswold, Director of Archival Research, The Sylvester Manor Project, Shelter Island, New York: The history of Sylvester Manor, a Long Island plantation.
- Alexandra Halkin, Video Maker, Chicago; International Coordinator, Chiapas Media Project, Promedios de Comunicación Comunitaria, Chicago: Video.
- Deborah E. Harkness, Associate Professor of History, University of California, Davis: Science, medicine, and technology in Elizabethan London.
- Jeffrey Herbst, Professor of Politics and International Affairs, Princeton University: Geography and the development of states.
- David W. Hertzog, Professor of Physics, University of Illinois at Urbana-Champaign: Precision measurements of the Fermi constant and the muon anomaly.
- Bruce W. Holsinger, Associate Professor of English, University of Colorado, Boulder: Liturgical culture and vernacular writing in England, 1000–1550.
- Andrew Hudgins, Poet, Columbus, Ohio; Humanities Distinguished Professor of English, Ohio State University: Poetry.
- Lorna Hutson, Professor of English Literature, University of California, Berkeley: Forensic realism in English Renaissance drama.
- Russell Impagliazzo, Professor of Computer Science and Engineering, University of California, San Diego: Heuristics, proof complexity, and algorithmic techniques.
- Lawson Fusao Inada, Poet, Medford, Oregon; Professor Emeritus of English, Southern Oregon University: Poetry.
- Alexandra Jaffe, Associate Professor of Linguistics, California State University, Long Beach: Language, citizenship, and identity in a bilingual Corsican school.
- Leroy Jenkins, Composer and Performer, Brooklyn, New York: Music composition.
- Steven Johnstone, Associate Professor of History, University of Arizona: A history of trust in classical Greece.
- Deborah Kahn, Artist, Silver Spring, Maryland; Associate Professor of Fine Arts, American University: Painting.
- Mary Karr, Poet, Syracuse, New York; Jess Truesdell Peck Professor of Literature, Syracuse University: Poetry.
- Elizabeth A. Kellogg, E. Desmond Lee and Family Professor of Botanical Studies, University of Missouri–St. Louis: Development of grass flowers and inflorescences.
- Ellen D. Ketterson, Professor of Biology and Professor of Gender Studies, Indiana University: Sex and gender in animals.
- Ann Marie Kimball, Professor of Epidemiology and Health Sciences and adjunct professor of Biomedical Health Informatics and Medicine, University of Washington, Seattle: Emerging infections in an era of global trade.
- Peter Kivy, Board of Governors Professor of Philosophy, Rutgers University: The performance of reading.
- Mark Klett, Photographer, Tempe, Arizona; Regent's Professor of Art, Arizona State University: Photography.
- Stephen M. Kosslyn, John Lindsley Professor of Psychology in Memory of William James, Harvard University: Mental imagery and the brain.
- Stephen Kotkin, Professor of History, Princeton University: A historical study of the Ob River basin.
- Joey Kötting, Artist, Brooklyn, New York: Painting.
- Joyce Kozloff, Artist, New York City: Painting and installation art.
- Kannan M. Krishnan, Campbell Professor of Materials Science, University of Washington, Seattle: Magnetic nanoparticles for cancer therapeutics.
- Timur Kuran, Professor of Economics and Law, and King Faisal Professor of Islamic Thought and Culture, University of Southern California: Islamic influences on Middle Eastern governance.
- Joan La Barbara, Composer and Performer, New York City: Music composition.
- Michael T. Lacey, Professor of Mathematics, Georgia Institute of Technology: Singular integrals on smoothly varying lines.
- Lisa Lapinski, Artist, Los Angeles: Installation art.
- Niklaus Largier, Professor of German Literature, University of California, Berkeley: A history of taste and touch in medieval traditions.
- thi diem thúy lê, Writer, Northampton, Massachusetts: Fiction.
- Benjamin Lee, Professor of Anthropology, Rice University: Cultures of circulation.
- James Z. Lee, Professor of History and Sociology and research professor, Institute for Social Research, University of Michigan: Social and family change in Liaoning, 1850-2000 (in collaboration with Cameron Campbell).
- Robert A. LeVine, Roy E. Larsen Professor Emeritus of Education and Human Development, Harvard University: The anthropology of parenting.
- Mark Lilla, Professor, Committee on Social Thought, University of Chicago: Modern political theology.
- M. Susan Lindee, Professor of History and Sociology of Science, University of Pennsylvania: Science, medicine, and war in the twentieth century.
- Hong Ma, Professor of Biology, Pennsylvania State University: Analysis of plant meiosis using three-dimensional light-microscopic techniques.
- Alberto Manguel, Writer, Mondion, France: A memoir of libraries.
- Douglas Mao, Associate Professor of English, Cornell University: Aesthetic environment and human development in 20th-century writing.
- Matthew Marello, Video Maker, New York City: Video.
- Curtis T. McMullen, Maria Moors Cabot Professor of Natural Science, Harvard University: Dynamics over moduli space.
- Sarah McPhee, Associate Professor of Art History, Emory University; Visiting associate professor of Art History, Columbia University: A portrait of Bernini's mistress, Costanza Piccolomini.
- Douglas Medin, Professor of Psychology and Education and Social Policy, Northwestern University: Mental models of biological resources.
- Maile Meloy, Writer, Los Angeles: Fiction.
- Ernesto Mestre, Writer, Brooklyn, New York; Assistant Professor of Fiction, Brooklyn College, City University of New York; Member of the Guest Faculty in Writing, Sarah Lawrence College: Fiction.
- Christopher Miller, Professor of Biochemistry and Howard Hughes Medical Institute Investigator, Brandeis University: Structures of potassium and chloride channels.
- Joseph C. Miller, T. Cary Johnson, Jr. Professor of History, University of Virginia: Slavery as a historical process.
- Ross L. Miller, Professor of English and Comparative Literature, University of Connecticut: The Jewish discovery of America, 1881–1914.
- Gregg A. Mitman, Professor of History of Science, Medical History, and Science & Technology Studies, University of Wisconsin–Madison: An ecological history of allergy in America.
- Robert Moeller, Professor of History, University of California, Irvine: Modern Germanies, 1933–1973.
- Jennifer Monson, Choreographer, New York City: Choreography.
- Honor Moore, Member of the Core Faculty, Graduate Writing Program, New School University: A memoir of her relationship with her father.
- Alexander V. Neimark, Director of Research, Center for Modeling and Characterization of Nanoporous Materials, Textile Research Institute (TRI), Princeton, New Jersey: Equilibrium and phase transitions in nanoscale systems.
- Ann Nelson, Professor of Physics, University of Washington, Seattle: Cosmology and particle physics.
- Jeremy Nelson, Choreographer, Brooklyn, New York; Guest Artist, Connecticut College: Choreography.
- Andrew Neumann, Artist, Boston, Massachusetts: Video installation art.
- Carolyn Nordstrom, Associate Professor of Anthropology, University of Notre Dame: The power and cultures of the extra-legal in the 21st century.
- John O'Loughlin, Professor of Geography and Faculty Research Associate, Institute of Behavioral Science, University of Colorado, Boulder: Ukraine's new borders and geopolitics.
- Dael Orlandersmith, Playwright, New York City: Play writing.
- Mark Osborne, Film Maker, Los Angeles: Film making.
- Julie Otsuka, Writer, New York City: Fiction.
- J. B. "Jack" Owens, Professor of History, Idaho State University: Clandestine political economies and the exercise of public authority in Philip II's Spain.
- Mitko Panov, Film Maker, Austin, Texas; Associate Professor of Film Production, University of Texas at Austin: Film making.
- Philip Pavia, Artist, New York City: Sculpture.
- Fred Pelka, Writer, Florence, Massachusetts; Principal Researcher and Interviewer, Oral History Project on Disability Rights and Independent Living, Bancroft Library, University of California, Berkeley: An oral history of the disability-rights movement in America.
- Peggy Phelan, Ann O'Day Maples Chair in the Arts, and Professor of Drama, Stanford University: Politics and aesthetics after 9/11.
- Larry Polansky, Composer, Hanover, New Hampshire; Associate Professor of Music, Dartmouth College: Music composition.
- William Pope.L, Artist, Lewiston, Maine; Lecturer in Theatre and Rhetoric, Bates College: Installation art.
- Marlo Poras, Film Maker, Brookline, Massachusetts; Editor, Camerawoman.: Film making.
- Stephen Quay, Film Maker, London, England: Film making (in collaboration with Timothy Quay).
- Timothy Quay, Film Maker, London, England: Film making (in collaboration with Stephen Quay).
- Robert J. Richards, Morris Fishbein Professor of History of Science, University of Chicago: Ernst Haeckel and the battle over evolution in Germany.
- Loren H. Rieseberg, Distinguished Professor of Biology, Indiana University: The origin and evolution of plant species.
- Nancy Lin Rose, Professor of Economics, Massachusetts Institute of Technology: Regulatory reform and restructuring.
- David Roussève, Choreographer, Los Angeles, California; Distinguished Professor of Choreography, and chairman, Department of World Arts and Cultures, University of California, Los Angeles: Choreography.
- Kay Ryan, Poet, Fairfax, California; Instructor in Writing, College of Marin: Poetry.
- Katy Schneider, Artist, Northampton, Massachusetts; Lecturer in Art, Smith College: Painting.
- Grace Schulman, Poet, New York City; Distinguished Professor of English, Baruch College, City University of New York: Poetry.
- Rebecca J. Scott, Charles Gibson Distinguished University Professor of History and Professor of Law, University of Michigan: The legal history of slavery and emancipation in Cuba and Louisiana.
- Tamar Seideman, Professor of Chemistry, Northwestern University: Current-driven dynamics in molecular-scale devices.
- Jerrold Seigel, William R. Kenan, Jr. Professor of History, New York University: Modernity and bourgeois life in Europe.
- Martha Ann Selby, Associate Professor of South Asian Studies, University of Texas at Austin: Form, style, and symbol in a late Old Tamil romantic anthology.
- Vijay Seshadri, Poet, Brooklyn, New York; Professor and Director of Graduate Non-Fiction Writing Program, Sarah Lawrence College: Poetry.
- Jim Shaw, Artist, Los Angeles; Member of the Adjunct Faculty, Art Center College of Design: Painting and installation art.
- Arlene J. Shechet, Artist, New York City: Sculpture.
- Laura Ackerman Smoller, Associate Professor of History, University of Arkansas at Little Rock; Adjunct Associate Professor of Medical Humanities, University of Arkansas for Medical Sciences: The cult of Vincent Ferrer and the religious life of the later Middle Ages.
- SOL'SAX, Artist, Brooklyn, New York; Lecturer in Art, Medgar Evers College, City University of New York: Sculpture.
- Scott Spencer, Writer, Rhinebeck, New York: Fiction.
- Ellen Spiro, Film Maker, Austin, Texas; Associate Professor of Film, University of Texas at Austin: Film making.
- Timothy A. Springer, Latham Family Professor of Pathology, CBR Institute for Biomedical Research, Harvard University Medical School: X-ray crystallography of integrins and their cytoplasmic activators.
- Peter Stallybrass, Walter H. and Lenore C. Annenberg Professor of Humanities and Professor of English, University of Pennsylvania: Technologies of reading and writing in early modern England and America.
- David Stern, Roth Meltzer Professor of Classical Hebrew Literature, University of Pennsylvania: Four classic Jewish books and the Jewish historical experience.
- Joann M. Stock, Professor of Geology and Geophysics, California Institute of Technology: A comparative tectonic history of two rift basins.
- Richard Stone, Writer, Ft. Lauderdale, Florida; European News Editor, Science International: Marco Polo's magicians and sorcerers.
- Joan E. Strassmann, Professor of Ecology and Evolutionary Biology, Rice University: A microbial model for the genetics and evolution of social interactions.
- Manil Suri, Writer, Silver Spring, Maryland; Professor of Mathematics, University of Maryland, Baltimore County: Fiction.
- Alan M. Taylor, Professor of Economics, University of California, Davis: International trade and international finance.
- Margo Todd, Walter H. Annenberg Professor of History, University of Pennsylvania: Council, kirk, and guild in early modern Perth.
- Leo Treitler, Distinguished Professor Emeritus of Music, Graduate Center of the City University of New York: A study of discourse about music.
- J. Marshall Unger, Professor of Japanese and chairman, Department of East Asian Languages and Literatures, Ohio State University: Language contact in early Japanese history.
- Veronica Vaida, Professor of Chemistry, University of Colorado, Boulder: Molecular properties of atmospheric organic aerosols.
- Jeffrey Vallance, Artist, Reseda, California; Visiting assistant professor of art, University of California, Los Angeles: Installation art.
- Katherine Verdery, Eric R. Wolf Collegiate Professor of Anthropology, University of Michigan: Collectivization in Romania, 1948–1962.
- Gregory A. Voth, Professor of Chemistry and Director, Center for Biophysical Modeling & Simulation, University of Utah: Biomolecular systems over large length and time scales.
- Susan Jane Walp, Artist, Chelsea, Vermont; Lecturer in Studio Art, Dartmouth College: Painting.
- Mary Anne Weaver, Writer, New York City: The world of militant Islam.
- Timberlake Wertenbaker, Playwright, London, England: Play writing.
- Frances White, Composer, Princeton, New Jersey: Music composition.
- William T. Wiley, Artist, Woodacre, California: Painting and sculpture.
- Carolyn Williams, Associate Professor of English, Rutgers University: The aesthetics of melodramatic form.
- Clara Williams, Artist and Writer, Bronx, New York: Sculpture and installation art.
- Gwendolyn Wright, Professor of Architecture, Columbia University: Modern housing in America.
- Carolyn Yarnell, Composer, Laguna Hills, California: Music composition.
- Yin Mei, Choreographer, Port Washington, New York; Associate Professor of Dance, Queens College, City University of New York; artistic director, Yin Mei Dance: Choreography.
- Pamela Z, Composer and Performer, San Francisco: Music composition.
- William R. Zame, Professor of Economics and Professor of Mathematics, University of California, Los Angeles: Theoretical and experimental studies of financial markets.
- Xiao Cheng Zeng, Willa Cather Professor of Chemistry, University of Nebraska–Lincoln: Novel nanostructures of silicon.
- David W. Zingg, Canada Research Chair in Computational Aerodynamics and associate director, Institute for Aerospace Studies, University of Toronto: The design of environmentally friendly aircraft.
- David Zuckerman, Professor of Computer Science, University of Texas at Austin: Randomness and computation.

== Latin American and Caribbean Fellows ==
- Coriún Aharonián, Composer and Musicologist, Montevideo, Uruguay: Socio-cultural, political, and aesthetic dimensions of the tango, past and present.
- Carlos Darío Albornoz, Scientific Photographer, Miguel Lillo Institute, National University of Tucumán; Principal Technician, National Council of Argentina (CONICET): Photography.
- Carlos Washington Altamirano, co-director, Program of Intellectual History, National University of Quilmes: Social science and socialist science in Argentina, 1890–1914.
- Raúl Antelo, Professor of Brazilian Literature, Federal University of Saint Catherine: Maria Martins and Marcel Duchamp.
- J. Eduardo P. W. Bicudo, Professor of Physiology, University of São Paulo: Nutritional adaptation in humans subjected to malnutrition.
- Liset Castillo, Sculptor and Photographer, Amsterdam, the Netherlands: Sculpture.
- Nicolás Antonio Casullo, Professor of the History of Modern Ideas, University of Buenos Aires; Professor of Cultural Studies, National University of Quilmes: Revolutionary vanguards in the 1970s and the popular movements of 2001–2002 in Argentina.
- Emilio de Ipola, Professor of Sociological Theory, University of Buenos Aires; Principal Researcher, National Research Council of Argentina (CONICET): Political and ideological formation of youth during the first Peronism, 1946–1955.
- Paolo Di Mascio, Professor of Biochemistry, Institute of Chemistry, University of São Paulo: The reactions of reactive oxygen species with critical cellular biomolecules.
- Carmen Dragonetti, Superior Researcher, National Research Council of Argentina (CONICET), President, Buddhist Studies Institute Foundation (FIEB): The myth of the opposition between Indian thought and Western philosophy.
- Lucila Irene Edelman, Psychologist, Buenos Aires; Executive Committee Member, Argentine Team of Psycho-Social Work and Research (EATIP); Professor of Psychiatry and Psychology, National University of de Mar del Plata: Multigenerational psychological effects of dictatorial repression (in collaboration with Diana Ruth Kordon).
- Rosario Ferre, Writer, San Juan, Puerto Rico: Fiction.
- Ricardo T. Gazzinelli, Principal Investigator, René Rachou Research Center, Oswaldo Cruz Foundation, and Professor, Department of Biochemistry and Immunology, Institute of Biological Sciences, Federal University of Minas Gerais, Minas Gerais, Brazil: The role of toll-like receptors in malaria pathogenesis.
- Mario Handler, Film Maker, Montevideo, Uruguay: Film making.
- Jorge Hernández Díaz, Research Professor of Anthropology, Autonomous University "Benito Juarez" of Oaxaca, Mexico: Multiple citizenship construction in a pluricultural space.
- Beatriz Jaguaribe, Professor of Communications, Federal University of Rio de Janeiro: Public photography and the images of the nation in Brazil, 1937–1945.
- Liliana Katinas, Assistant Professor of Biogeography and Botany, National University of La Plata; Adjunct Researcher, National Research Council of Argentina (CONICET): Evolution and biogeography in Nassauviinae.
- Diana Ruth Kordon, Psychiatrist, Buenos Aires; Coordinator, Argentine Team of Psycho-Social Work and Research (EATIP); Professor of Psychology and Group Psychoanalysis, National University of de Mar del Plata: Multigenerational psychological effects of dictatorial repression (in collaboration with Lucila Edelman).
- Claudio Landim, Research Professor, Institute of Pure and Applied Mathematics (IMPA): The hydrodynamic limit of interacting particle systems.
- Daniel Link, Associate Professor of Twentieth Century Literature, University of Buenos Aires; Director, Radarlibros, Literary Supplement of Pagina/12: Grammar of imagined sexualities in Latin America.
- Oscar E. Martínez, Professor of Physics, University of Buenos Aires: Development of new nanoscopies and nano-spectroscopies.
- Silvio Luis Mattoni, Poet, Córdoba, Argentina; Adjunct Professor of Aesthetics, National University of Córdoba; Literary Critic, La voz del interior: Poetry.
- Lina Meruane, Writer, Santiago, Chile; Columnist and Cultural Reporter, Diario El Mercurio: Fiction.
- Cristina Messineo, Associate Researcher, National Research Council of Argentina (CONICET); Professor of Linguistics, University of Buenos Aires: Language and style in Toba verbal art.
- Gabriela Ortiz Torres, Composer, Mexico City; Professor of Composition, National Autonomous University of Mexico (UNAM): Music composition.
- Ignacio Padilla, Writer, Querétaro, Mexico: Fiction.
- Margarita Paksa, Multimedia and Conceptual Artist, Buenos Aires, Argentina: Multimedia and conceptual art.
- Yolanda Pantin, Poet, Caracas, Venezuela: Poetry.
- Juan Pablo Paz, Member of the Technical Staff, Los Alamos National Laboratory, New Mexico; Associate Professor of Physics, University of Buenos Aires: Decoherence and quantum computation.
- Marco A. M. Prado, Associate Professor of Pharmacology, Federal University of Minas Gerais: Trafficking and activity regulation of the high-affinity choline transporter.
- Leticia Reina, Research Professor of History, National Institute of Anthropology and History, Mexico City: Political engagement by indigenous peoples in the 19th century.
- Luis A. Humberto Rodríguez Pastor, Director of Social Sciences, National Council of Science and Technology (CONCYTEC); Professor of Anthropology, National University of San Marcos: The Chinese of Lima and the Peruvian Chinese community.
- Homero Rubbo, Associate Professor of Biochemistry, University of the Republic, Montevideo: Nitric oxide and nitrated species in inflammation and human vascular disease.
- Aristides Osvaldo Félix Salerno Nuñez, Installation Artist, Asunción, Paraguay; Director, Museo del Barro, Asunción: Installation art.
- Ricardo D. Salvatore, Professor of History, Torcuato Di Tella University, Buenos Aires: Economic development and nutritional convergence in Argentina between the Great War and Peronism.
- Jorge Volpi, Writer, Mexico City: Fiction.
