= Zapatista territories =

Autonomous region in Chiapas, Mexico

- Flag
- Motto: Aquí manda el Pueblo y el Gobierno Obedece (Spanish) "Here the people command and the government obeys"
- Anthem: Himno Zapatista
- Territory partially or totally controlled by the Zapatista Army of National Liberation
- Coordinates: 16°55′33″N 92°45′37″W

Population
  - Estimate (2018): 300,000
- Demonym(s): zapatista neozapatista chiapaneco

The Zapatista territories are a de facto autonomous region controlled or partially controlled by neo-Zapatista support bases in Chiapas, Mexico. They have existed since the Zapatista uprising in 1994 and are part of the wider Chiapas conflict.

From 1994 to 2003, the Zapatista territories were structured as regional community centers called Aguascalientes. In 2003, the Aguascalientes were replaced by Centers of Autonomous Resistance and Zapatista Rebellion (CRAREZ), a term coined in 2019, which consisted of Caracoles as community centers, over local formations (until 2023) as the Rebel Zapatista Autonomous Municipalities (MAREZ) governed by Councils of Good Government (Spanish: Juntas de Buen Gobierno).

In 2023, after increased cartel violence, the EZLN announced the dissolution of the MAREZ and its sub-formations, replacing them with Local Autonomous Governments (GAL) within local Zapatista Autonomous Government Collectives (CGAZ) and regional Assemblies of Collectives of Zapatista Autonomous Governments (ACGAZ). Despite attempts at negotiation with the Mexican government which resulted in the San Andrés Accords in 1996, the region's autonomy remains unrecognized by it.

The Zapatista Army of National Liberation (EZLN) does not hold formal political power in Zapatista governance. According to its constitution, no commander or member of the Clandestine Revolutionary Indigenous Committee may take positions of authority or government in these spaces.

== History ==
=== Zapatista uprising ===
On 1 January 1994, thousands of EZLN members occupied towns and cities in Chiapas, burning down police stations, occupying government buildings, and skirmishing with the Mexican army. The EZLN demanded "work, land, housing, food, health care, education, independence, freedom, democracy, justice, and peace" in their communities. The Zapatistas seized over a million acres from large landowners during their revolution.

=== Reorganization in 2003 ===
In 2003, the Aguascalientes were replaced by Centers of Autonomous Resistance and Zapatista Rebellion (CRAREZ), a term coined in 2019, which consisted of Caracoles as community centers, over local formations (until 2023) as the Rebel Zapatista Autonomous Municipalities (MAREZ) governed by Councils of Good Government (Spanish: Juntas de Buen Gobierno).

=== COVID-19 pandemic ===
COVID triggered a decline in the Zapatista movement owing to inconsistent responses around cooperating with the Mexican government to distribute the vaccine.

=== Dissolution of MAREZ in 2023 ===
In early November 2023, a communique signed by Subcomandante Moises announced the dissolution of the Rebel Zapatista Autonomous Municipalities, along with their Councils of Good Government. The announcement declared that, effective immediately, all positions and documents related to the MAREZ would be considered invalid. The statement clarified that the Caracoles (Zapatista community centres) would continue providing their services to locals, but would be "closed to outsiders".

Although he did not describe specific reasons for the dissolution, Moises cited rising cartel violence along the Guatemala–Mexico border, where many of its municipalities are located. The state of Chiapas had already been experiencing a rise in people smuggling, drug trafficking and open conflict between the Sinaloa Cartel and the Jalisco New Generation Cartel. In September 2021, the EZLN had described the situation in the state as a "civil war". The Zapatistas reported that the cartels, which they linked with the Mexican government, had carried out "road blockades, robberies, kidnappings, extortion, forced recruitment, [and] shootouts" in the region. The statement described the cities of Chiapas as being in "complete chaos", and that many (including San Cristóbal de las Casas, Comitán, Las Margaritas and Palenque) were controlled by the cartels. They also reported that the Mexican Army and National Guard, which had deployed thousands of troops to the region, had not combatted criminal violence; they claimed that the Mexican state's troops were only there to prevent illegal immigration to the United States.

According to the statement, the decision to dissolve the MAREZ had been discussed for months prior to the announcement. It has been speculated that the decision had been taken due to the then-upcoming 2024 Mexican general election. According to Mexican anthropologist Gaspar Morquecho, the Zapatistas had also become "increasingly isolated", cutting ties with other organisations. Morquecho claimed this had caused many in the younger generation to leave the Zapatista municipalities, in order to seek work or education. Moises promised that future statements would clarify the reasons for the decision, as well as details on the restructuring of "Zapatista autonomy". The statement also stated the Zapatistas' intention to celebrate the 30th anniversary of their uprising, inviting people to come, while also warning that Chiapas was no longer safe.

In the middle of the month, EZLN issued a declaration that announced the new structure for the autonomous region, creating Local Autonomous Governments (GAL) within local Zapatista Autonomous Government Collectives (CGAZ) and regional Assemblies of Collectives of Zapatista Autonomous Governments (ACGAZ). The new structure is more decentralized and would replace the previously dissolved Municipalities, allowing the base communities to better unite and act.

== Distribution ==
From 2003 until their dissolution in 2023, the Rebel Zapatista Autonomous Municipalities (MAREZ) coordinated in very small groups called caracoles (English: "snails" or "seashells"). Before that, the Neo-Zapatistas used the title of Aguascalientes after the site of the EZLN-organized National Democratic Convention on 8 August 1994; this name alluded to the Convention of Aguascalientes during the Mexican Revolution where Emiliano Zapata and other leaders met in 1914 and Zapata made an alliance with Francisco Villa.

Distribution of Rebel Zapatista Autonomous Municipalities (MAREZ) locations
MAREZ	Caracol	Former name (Aguascalientes)	Indigenous Groups	Area and municipalities in which they were found
General Emiliano Zapata; San Pedro de Michoacán; Liberty of the Maya People; Land and Liberty	Mother of the sea snails of our dreams	La Realidad	Tojolabales, Tzeltales, and Mames	Selva Fronteriza. "Ocosingo, Marques de Comillas"
17 November; First of January; Ernesto Ché Guevara; Olga Isabel; Lucio Cabañas; Miguel Hidalgo; Vicente Guerrero	Whirlwind of our words	Morelia	Tzeltales, Tzotziles, and Tojolabales	Tzots Choj Altamirano, Comitán
Francisco Gómez; San Manuel; Francisco Villa; Ricardo Flores Magón	Resistance toward a new dawn	La Garrucha	Tzeltales	Selva Tzeltal "Ocosingo, Altamirano"
Vicente Guerrero; Del Trabajo; La Montaña; San José en Rebeldía; La Paz; Benito Juárez; Francisco Villa	That speaks for all	Roberto Barrios	Choles, Zoques, and Tzeltales	Zona Norte de Chiapas San Andrés Larrainzar, El Bosque, Simojovel de allende
San Andrés Sacamch’en de los Pobres; San Juan de la Libertad; San Pedro Polhó; Santa Catarina; Magdalena de la Paz; 16 February; San Juan Apóstol Cancuc	Resistance and rebellion for humanity	Oventic	Tzotziles, and Tzeltales	Altos de Chiapas, San Andrés Larrainzar, Teopisca.
Hope of Humanity		Ejido Santa María		Chicomuselo
Ernesto Che Guevara		El Belén		Motozintla
Planting consciousness in order to harvest revolutions for life		Tulan Ka’u		Amatenango del Valle
21 December		K’anal Hulub		Chilón

Distribution of Centers of Autonomous Resistance and Zapatista Rebellion (CRAREZ) locations
CRAREZ	Caracol	Former name (Aguascalientes)	Area and municipalities in which they were found
Steps of History, for the life of Humanity	The heart of rebellious seeds collective, memory of Comrade Galeano	La Unión	San Quintín
Seed that flourishes with the conscience of those who struggle forever	Dignified spiral weaving the colors of humanity in memory of the fallen ones		
New Dawn in resistance and rebellion for life and humanity	Flourishing the rebellious seed	El Poblado Patria Nueva	Ocosingo
The rebellious thinking of the original peoples	In honor of the memory of Comrade Manuel	Dolores Hidalgo	Ocosingo
The light that shines on the world	Resistance and rebellion, a new horizon	El Poblado Nuevo Jerusalén	Ocosingo
Heart of our lives for the new future	Root of the resistances and the rebellions for humanity	Ejido Jolj’a	Tila
Flower of our word and light of our people that reflects for all	Jacinto Canek	Comunidad del CIDECI-Unitierra	San Cristóbal de las Casas

== Governance ==
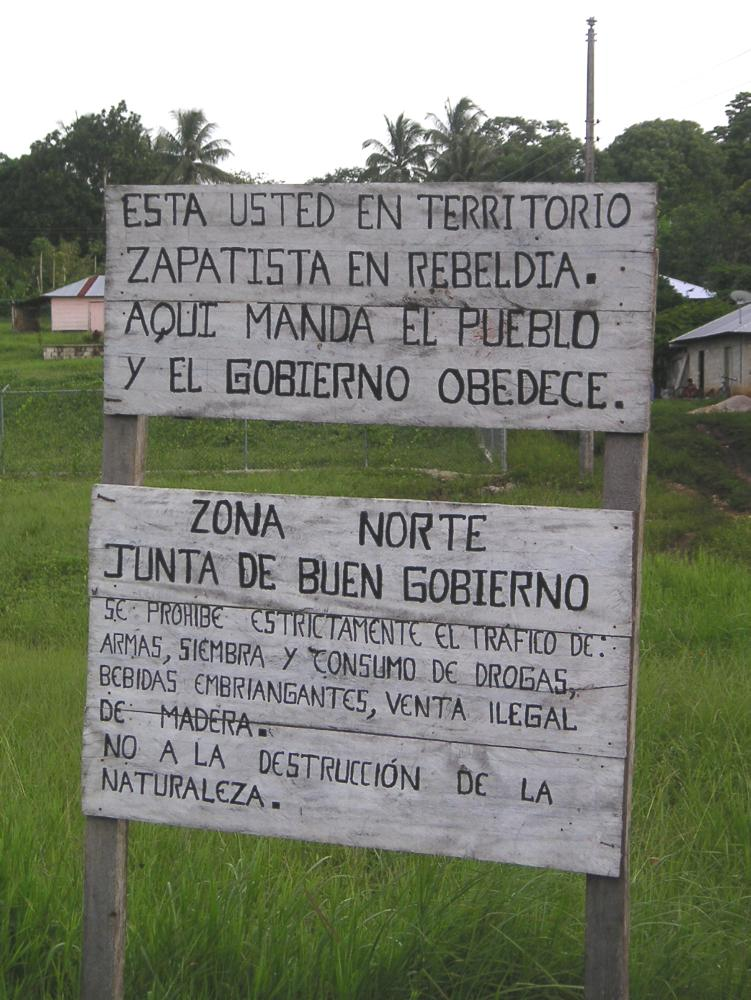
The sign reads (top): "You are in Zapatista rebel territory. Here the people rule and the government obeys." Bottom: "North Zone. Council of Good Government. Trafficking in weapons, planting of drugs, drug use, alcoholic beverages, and illegal sales of wood are strictly prohibited. No to the destruction of nature." Federal Highway 307, Chiapas.

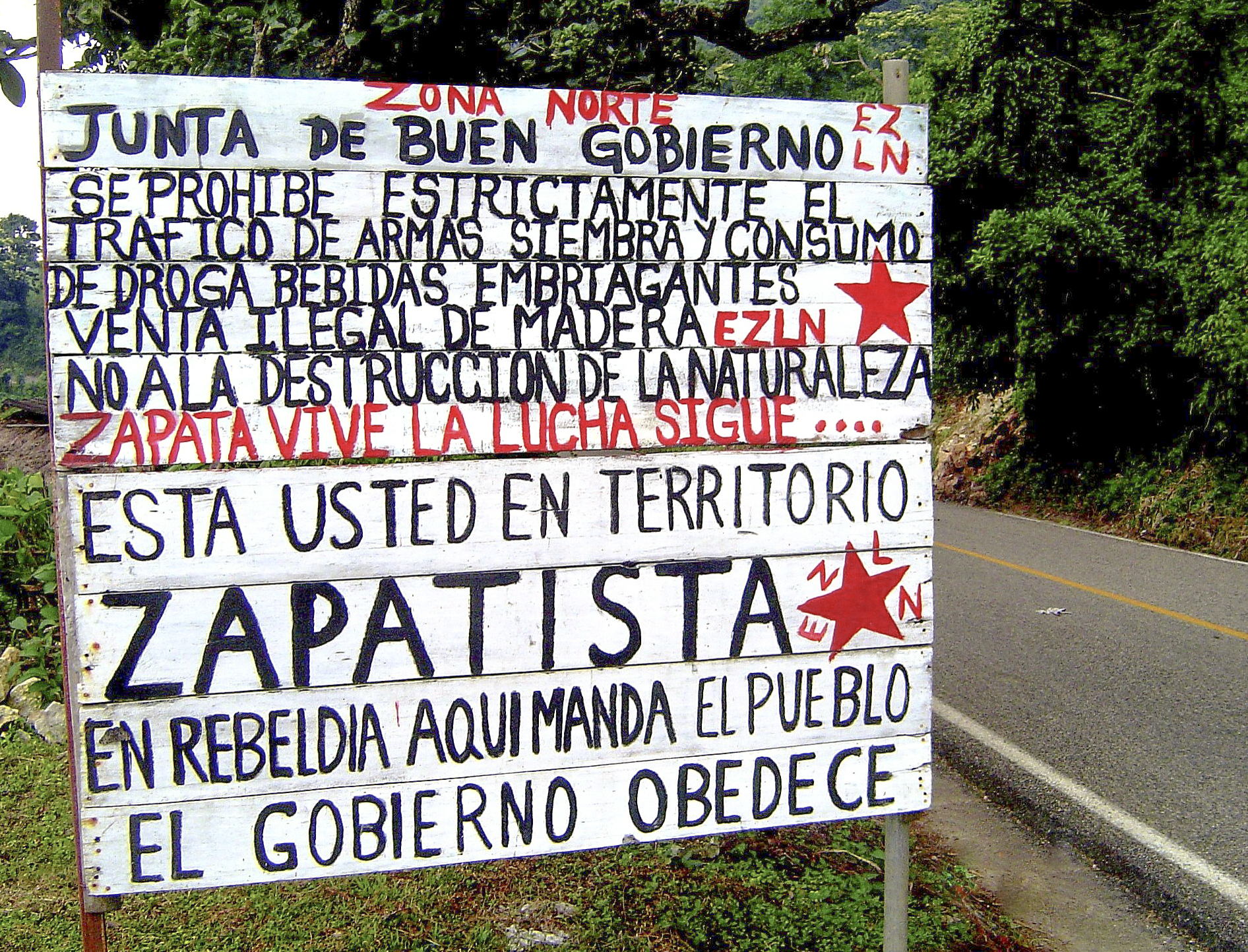
Zapatistas Territory sign in Chiapas, Mexico

Within the MAREZ, popular assemblies each consisted of around 300 families in which anyone over the age of twelve could participate in decision-making. These assemblies strove to reach a consensus, but were willing to fall back to a majority vote. The communities formed a federation with other communities to create an autonomous municipality, which formed further federations with other municipalities to create a region. Each community had three main administrative structures: (1) the commissariat, in charge of day-to-day administration; (2) the council for land control, which dealt with forestry and disputes with neighboring communities; and (3) the agencia, a community police agency.

== Public services ==
After the dissolution of the MAREZ, Subcomandante Moises said in an official statement that the Caracoles (Zapatista community centres) would continue providing their services to locals, but would be "closed to outsiders".

=== Education ===
The Zapatistas run hundreds of schools with thousands of teachers. They are modeled around the principles of democratic education in which students and communities collectively decide on school curriculum and students are not graded.

=== Healthcare ===
The Zapatistas maintain a universal healthcare service which is provided free of charge. However, patients still have to pay for medications to cover restocking costs. The Zapatistas built two new hospitals and 18 health clinics in the region by the mid-1990s. One 2014 study indicated the following achievements in Zapatista healthcare:

- In 2005, 84.2% of Zapatista children were fully vaccinated, while that figure stood at 74.8% in pro-government communities.
- In regions where there were previously significantly high rates of death during childbirth, there has now been a period of eight years or more where no maternal deaths have been recorded.
- The manufacture and consumption of alcohol has been banned, which is directly linked to the reduction in many illnesses and infections including ulcers, cirrhosis, malnutrition, and surgical wounds. Banning the consumption of alcohol was a collective decision. Nayely, a Zapatista representative, stated that alcohol is "not good for one's health, and just wastes money".

According to one account of Oventic from 2016:

In Oventic, there was a small yet seemingly fully-functional medical clinic, which appeared to offer basic healthcare. A sign on the door said general consultations, gynecology, optometry and laboratory services were all available five days a week. Emergency services were available 24 hours, seven days a week. They appeared to have a shiny new ambulance at their disposal. Other services offered a few days a week included dentistry and ultrasounds.

=== Water ===
Many Zapatista communities are in rural areas with little access to running water. Projects were undertaken to supply Zapatista communities with fresh water. In one case, Roberto Arenas, a small Tzeltal community, built its own water service with the help of solidarity activists. Such projects were coordinated democratically. An account by Ramor Ryan noted:

The good government committee of the autonomous municipality refer the case to their elected water commission and the options are weighed. The commission consults various parties including the local EZLN commander and clandestine committee members, and so, in the end, after the issue has been bandied around what seems like half the inhabitants of this particular region of the jungle, the community of Roberto Arenas is notified about the eligibility of their request. It’s a process similar to what happens anywhere in the world at a local council level, except for one significant difference: the state authorities have no involvement whatsoever; this is an autonomous process overseen by the communities’ people. There is no separation between who is governed and who is governing—they are one and the same.

Ryan described the process of finishing the water project:

We’re getting lots of little bits and pieces done, fine tuning this and that. Helping people construct their family tap stands, digging here and there, testing the pressure, tightening valves. A group of women come together during the morning to put together a tap stand for the collective clothes washing area. We earmark a bag of cement—the very last one—for the later construction of a large concrete washbasin. The day is punctuated by minor moments of crisis—people coming up and saying that the water isn’t arriving to their house—but it is usually just a blocked pipe or a faulty connection. Really, the system is almost flawless and works perfectly fine; it’s been an exemplary project.

== See also ==
- Cherán
- Chiapas Media Project
- Chiapas conflict
- Democratic Autonomous Administration of North and East Syria
- FEJUVE
- Landless Workers' Movement
- Libertarian socialism
- Marinaleda
- Permanent autonomous zones
- Revolutionary Catalonia
- Zaachila
- Zapaturismo
- Zapatista Army of National Liberation
- Zone to Defend

== Bibliography ==
=== Books ===
- Barmeyer, Niels (2009). "Who is Running the Show? The Workings of Zapatista Government". Developing Zapatista Autonomy: Conflict and NGO Involvement in Rebel Chiapas. University of New Mexico Press. ISBN 978-0-8263-4584-4. LCCN 2008045276.
- Cerullo, Margaret (2009). "The Zapatistas Other Politics: The Subjects Of Autonomy". In Fasenfest, David (ed.). Engaging Social Justice: Critical Studies of 21st Century Social Transformation. Studies in Critical Social Sciences. Vol. 13. Brill Publishers. pp. 289–299. doi:10.1163/ej.9789004176546.i-350.94. ISBN 978-90-04-17654-6.
- Chabot, Sean; Vinthagen, Stellan (2020). "One no against violence, many yeses beyond violence: Zapatista dignity, autonomy, counter-conduct". In Jackson, Richard; Llewellyn, Joseph; Manawaroa Leonard, Griffin; Gnoth, Aidan; Karena, Tong (eds.). Revolutionary Nonviolence: Concepts, Cases and Controversies. Zed Books. pp. 107–131. ISBN 978-1-78699-825-5.
- Eldredge Fitzwater, Dylan (2019). Autonomy Is in Our Hearts: Zapatista Autonomous Government through the Lens of the Tsotsil Language. PM Press. ISBN 978-1-62963-580-4. LCCN 2018931534.
- Grubačić, Andrej; O'Hearn, Denis (2016). "Zapatistas". Living at the Edges of Capitalism: Adventures in Exile and Mutual Aid. University of California Press. ISBN 9780520287303. JSTOR 10.1525/j.ctv1xxx8z. LCCN 2015036704.
- Halkin, Alexandra (2008). "Outside the Indigenous Lens: Zapatistas and Autonomous Videomaking". In Wilson, Pamela; Stewart, Michelle (eds.). Global Indigenous Media: Cultures, Poetics, and Politics. Duke University Press. pp. 160–180. ISBN 9780822388692.
- Kovel, Joel (2007) [2002]. "Ecosocialism". Enemy of Nature: The End of Capitalism or the End of the World?. Zed Books. pp. 242–275. ISBN 978-1-84277-870-8.
- Muñóz Ramírez, Gloria (2008). The Fire and the Word: A History of the Zapatista Movement. Translated by Carlsen, Laura; Reyes Arias, Alejandro. City Lights. ISBN 978-0-87286-488-7. LCCN 2007052477.
- Ryan, Ramor (2011). Zapatista Spring: Anatomy of a Rebel Water Project & the Lessons of International Solidarity. AK Press. ISBN 978-1-84935-072-3. LCCN 2011925323.
- Speed, Shannon (2014). "Zapatista Autonomy, Local Governance, and an Organic Theory of Rights". In Warrior, Robert (ed.). The World of Indigenous North America. Routledge. pp. 82–102. ISBN 978-0-415-87952-1. LCCN 2013039796.
- Stahler-Sholk, Richard (2014). "Mexico: Autonomy, Collective Identity, and the Zapatista Social Movement". In Stahler-Sholk, Richard; Vanden, Harry E.; Becker, Marc (eds.). Rethinking Latin American Social Movements: Radical Action from Below. Rowman & Littlefield. pp. 187–207. ISBN 978-1-4422-3567-0. LCCN 2014030142.
- Zibechi, Raúl (2012). Territories in Resistance: A Cartography of Latin American Social Movements. AK Press. ISBN 978-1-84935-107-2. LCCN 2012937110.

=== Journal articles ===
- Chatterton, Paul; Ryan, Ramor (2008). "¡Ya Basta! The Zapatista struggle for autonomy revisited". City. 12 (1): 115–125. Bibcode:2008City...12..115C. doi:10.1080/13604810801933800. ISSN 1360-4813. S2CID 145770382.
- Cortez Ruiz, Carlos (2004). "Social Strategies and Public Policies in an Indigenous Zone in Chiapas, Mexico" (PDF). IDS Bulletin. 35 (2): 76–83. doi:10.1111/j.1759-5436.2004.tb00124.x. ISSN 0265-5012.
- Dinerstein, Ana Cecilia (2013). "The Speed of the Snail: The Zapatistas' Autonomy De Facto and the Mexican State". Bath Papers in International Development and Wellbeing (20): 1–17. doi:10.2139/ssrn.2401859. ISSN 2040-3151. S2CID 153929083.
- Earle, Duncan; Simonelli, Jeanne (2004). "The Zapatistas and Global Civil Society: Renegotiating the Relationship". European Review of Latin American and Caribbean Studies (76): 119–125. doi:10.18352/erlacs.9689. ISSN 0924-0608. JSTOR 25676076.
- Forbis, Melissa M. (2016). "After autonomy: the zapatistas, insurgent indigeneity, and decolonization". Settler Colonial Studies. 6 (4): 365–384. doi:10.1080/2201473X.2015.1090531. ISSN 2201-473X. S2CID 159590375.
- Fox, Jonathan (2007). "Rural democratization and decentralization at the state/society interface: What counts as 'local' government in the mexican countryside?". The Journal of Peasant Studies. 34 (3–4): 527–559. doi:10.1080/03066150701802934. ISSN 0306-6150. S2CID 152847463.
- Maldonado-Villalpando, Erandi; Paneque-Gálvez, Jaime; Demaria, Federico; Napoletano, Brian M. (2022). "Grassroots innovation for the pluriverse: evidence from Zapatismo and autonomous Zapatista education". Sustainability Science. 17 (4): 1301–1316. Bibcode:2022SuSc...17.1301M. doi:10.1007/s11625-022-01172-5. ISSN 1862-4065. PMC 9261257. PMID 35818623.
- González Casanova, Pablo (2005). "The Zapatista "caracoles": Networks of resistance and autonomy". Socialism and Democracy. 19 (3): 79–92. doi:10.1080/08854300500257963. ISSN 0885-4300. S2CID 144853640.
- Guillén, Diana (2017). "Societies in Movement vs. Institutional Continuities? Insights from the Zapatista Experience". Latin American Perspectives. 44 (4): 114–138. doi:10.1177/0094582X16635292. ISSN 0094-582X. S2CID 147296630.
- Harvey, Neil (2005). "Inclusion Through Autonomy: Zapatistas and Dissent". NACLA Report on the Americas. 39 (2): 12–17. doi:10.1080/10714839.2005.11722353. ISSN 1071-4839. S2CID 152256789.
- Harvey, Neil (2016). "Practicing autonomy: Zapatismo and decolonial liberation". Latin American and Caribbean Ethnic Studies. 11 (1): 1–24. doi:10.1080/17442222.2015.1094872. ISSN 1744-2222. S2CID 146183871.
- Mora, Mariana (2003). "The Imagination to Listen: Reflections on a Decade of Zapatista Struggle". Social Justice. 30 (3): 17–31. ISSN 1043-1578. JSTOR 29768206.
- Mora, Mariana (2007). "Zapatista Anticapitalist Politics and the "Other Campaign": Learning from the Struggle for Indigenous Rights and Autonomy". Latin American Perspectives. 34 (2): 64–77. doi:10.1177/0094582X06299086. ISSN 0094-582X. S2CID 145172536.
- Mora, Mariana (2015). "The Politics of Justice: Zapatista Autonomy at the Margins of the Neoliberal Mexican State". Latin American and Caribbean Ethnic Studies. 10 (1): 87–106. doi:10.1080/17442222.2015.1034439. ISSN 1744-2222. S2CID 146985966.
- Reyes, Alvaro; Kaufman, Mara (2011). "Sovereignty, Indigeneity, Territory: Zapatista Autonomy and the New Practices of Decolonization". South Atlantic Quarterly. 110 (2): 505–525. doi:10.1215/00382876-1162561. hdl:10161/10650. ISSN 0038-2876.
- Stahler-Sholk, Richard (2007). "Resisting Neoliberal Homogenization: The Zapatista Autonomy Movement". Latin American Perspectives. 34 (2): 48–63. doi:10.1177/0094582X06298747. ISSN 0094-582X. JSTOR 27648009. S2CID 143631891.
- Stahler-Sholk, Richard (2010). "The Zapatista Social Movement: Innovation and Sustainability". Alternatives: Global, Local, Political. 35 (3): 269–290. doi:10.1177/030437541003500306. ISSN 0304-3754. S2CID 144511806.
- van der Haar, Gemma (2004). "The Zapatista Uprising and the Struggle for Indigenous Autonomy". European Review of Latin American and Caribbean Studies (76): 99–108. ISSN 0924-0608. JSTOR 25676074.
- Zugman, Kara (2005). "Autonomy in a Poetic Voice: Zapatistas and Political Organizing in Los Angeles". Latino Studies. 3 (3): 325–346. doi:10.1057/palgrave.lst.8600157. ISSN 1476-3435. S2CID 143742914.
