= Yolanda Pantin =

Venezuelan poet (born 1954)

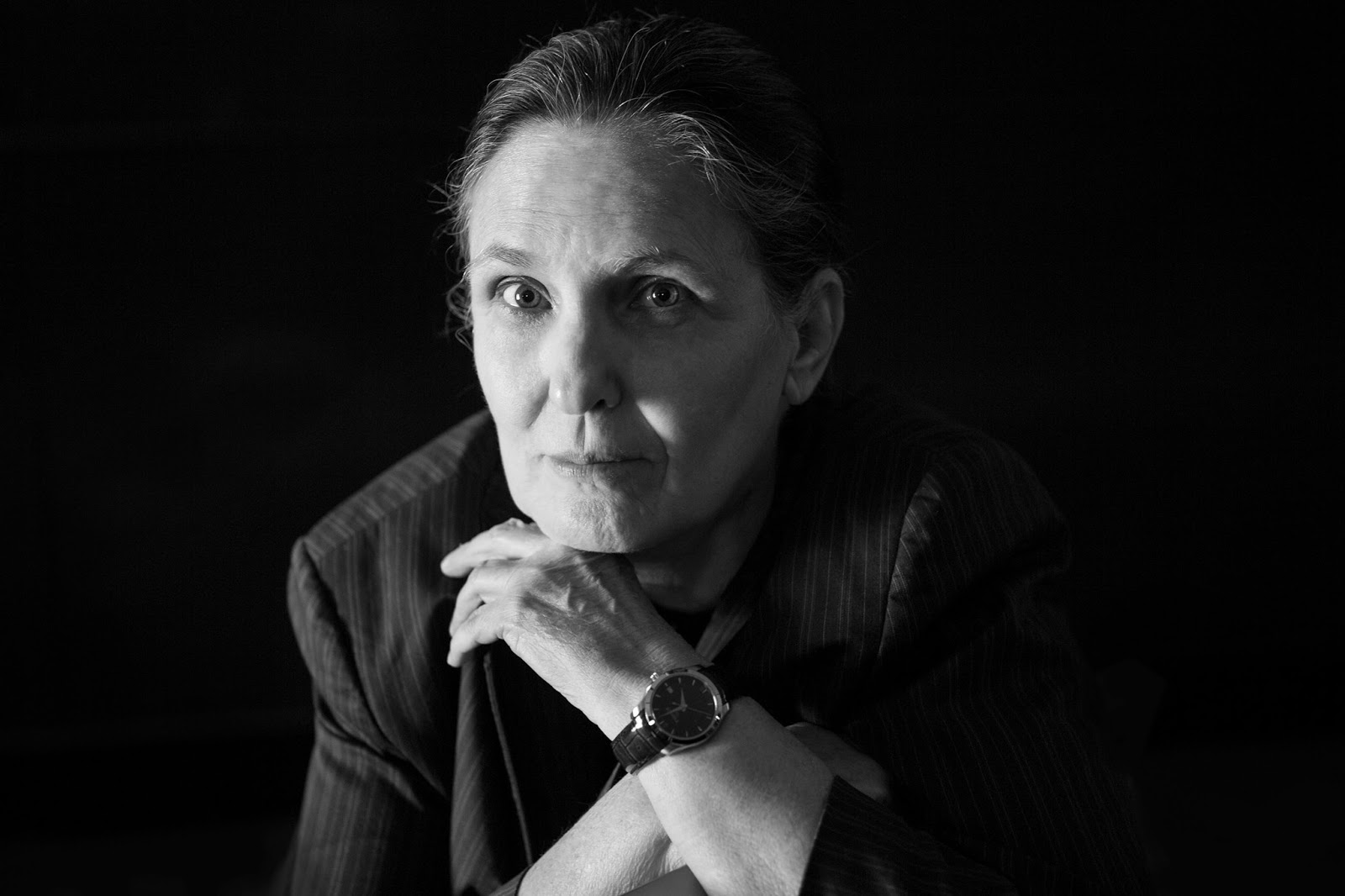
- Pantin photographed by Lisbeth Salas (2018)
- Born: 1954 (age 71–72); Caracas, Venezuela
- Education: Andrés Bello Catholic University
- Occupation: Writer
- Writing career
- Language: Spanish
- Genres: Poetry; children's literature
- Notable works: Casa o lobo; Correo del corazón; Poemas del escritor; Ratón y Vampiro se conocen; ¡Splash!; El hilo de la voz
- Notable awards: 2004, Guggenheim Fellowship; 2017, Premio Casa de América de Poesía Americana

Yolanda Pantin (born 1954) is a Venezuelan author who has mainly written poetry, although she has also worked in children's literature.

== Early life and education ==
Born in Caracas, the eldest of eleven siblings, she spent her childhood in Turmero, Aragua. There, she studied arts at the Escuela de Artes Plásticas (renamed, Escuela de Artes Visuales Rafael Monasterios). In 1974, she returned to Caracas to study literature at Andrés Bello Catholic University (UCAB).

== Career ==
Pantin, who is included in the literary generation of 1978, founded that year the university group "Rastros". Her first texts appeared in the magazine, which she herself illustrated. The following year, she won an honorable mention in the Francisco Lazo Martí award with Casa o lobo, her first collection of poems, which would be published in 1981 by Monte Ávila Editores.

In 1979, she joined the literary workshop "Calicanto", directed by the writer Antonia Palacios, where she rubbed shoulders with various writers of her generation. In 1981, she left Calicanto and co-founded Grupo Tráfico, which broke with and questioned the nocturnal poetic approaches that prevailed in Venezuela at that time. Tráfico published a literary manifesto that criticized the poetic canons they considered outdated, which had a wide repercussion and promoted aesthetic renovation.

In 1986, the Consejo Nacional de la Cultura awarded Pantin a creative scholarship to promote her literary projects. She also worked as a cultural journalist for the weekly Número and as co-editor of Qué Pasa. In 1989, she was one of the founders of the publishing house Pequeña Venecia, which publishes poetry. In 1990, with Santos López, she created the "Casa de la Poesía Foundation".

In 2001, the María Lionza statue in Caracas was the inspiration for Pantin's poem "The pelvic bone"; in the poem, the narrator travels into Caracas for a protest and sees the statue. The image of the pelvis – its "most notable feature" – stays in the narrator's mind, and the poem goes on to address the statue directly.

Pantin has been invited to book fairs and poetry festivals including the First Poetry Biennial (1991) in Val-de-Marne, France, and the Moscow Poetry Biennial (2019). Fond of photography, Pantin participated in the Dedicatorias exhibition held at the Fundación La Poeteca in 2019. There, a selection of images she took in 2008 while making the Trans-Siberian route could be seen.

== Awards and honours ==
- 1979, Honorable Mention, Francisco Lazo Martí National Poetry Prize, for Casa o lobo
- 1982, Honorable Mention, José Rafael Pocaterra Poetry Biennial, for Correo del corazón
- 1989, Fundarte Award, for Poemas del escritor
- 1994, List of Honor, International Board on Books for Young People, for Ratón y Vampiro se conocen
- 2000, Best Book of the Year Award, children's book category, Centro Nacional del Libro de Venezuela, for ¡Splash!
- 2003, Residency at the Bellagio Study Center of the Rockefeller Foundation and the Roberto Celli Memorial Fund scholarship to carry out with Ana Teresa Torres the research project which allowed them to publish, as co-editors, El hilo de la voz. Antología crítica de escritoras venezolanas del siglo XX (Fundación Polar, 2003)
- 2004, Guggenheim Fellowship
- 2015, Poets of the Latin World Victor Sandoval Award, for her work, Seminar of Mexican Culture and UNAM
- Selected for the anthology Il fiore della poesia latinoamericana d'oggi, volume 2, America meridionale - I
- 2017, XVII Premio Casa de América de Poesía Americana, for Lo que hace el tiempo
- 2020, XVII Premio Internacional de Poesía Federico García Lorca for her literary career

== Selected works ==
=== Poems ===
- Casa o lobo, colección Los Espacios Cálidos, Monte Ávila Editores, Caracas, 1981 (Ciencuentena de Cincuentena, 2002)
- Correo del corazón, Fundación para la Cultura y las Artes del Distrito Federal (Fundarte), Caracas, 1985
- El cielo de París, Fondo Editorial Pequeña Venecia, Caracas; 1989
- Poemas del escritor, Fundarte, Caracas, 1989
- La canción fría, Editorial Angria, Caracas, 1989
- Paya (Una elegía), Colecciones Clandestinas, Caracas, 1990
- Los bajos sentimientos, Monte Ávila Editores, Caracas, 1993
- La quietud, Pequeña Venecia, Caracas, 1998
- El hueso pélvico, Grupo Editorial Eclepsidra, Caracas, 2002
- La épica del padre, La Nave Va, Caracas, 2002
- Poemas huérfanos, La Liebre Libre, Maracay, 2002
- País, Fundación Bigott, Caracas, 2007; Frailejón Editores, Bogotá, 2021
- 21 caballos, editorial La Cámara Escrita, Caracas, 2011
- Bellas ficciones, Eclepsidra, Caracas, 2016
- Lo que hace el tiempo, Visor editorial, Madrid, 2017
- El dragón protegido, Editorial Pre-Textos, Valencia, 2021

=== Poetry collections/anthologies ===
- Poemas del escritor / El cielo de París, dos poemarios, Fundarte / Alcaldía del Municipio Libertador, Caracas, 1991
- Enemiga mía. Selección poética (1981-1997), Iberoamericana Editorial Vervuert, Madrid, 1998
- Poesía reunida 1981-2002, Otero Ediciones, Caracas, 2004
- Herencia. Selección poética (1981-2004), colección Atlántica, Ediciones Idea, Canarias, 2005
- País. Poesía reunida (1981-2011), Editorial Pre-Textos, Valencia, 2014
- El ciervo, antología, compilación de Néstor Mendoza; El Taller Blanco Ediciones, Bogotá, 2019

=== Children's and youth literature ===
- Ratón y Vampiro se conocen, Monte Ávila Editores, Caracas, 1991
- Ratón y Vampiro en el castillo, illustrated by Marcela Cabrera; Monte Ávila Editores, 1998
- ¡Splash!, illustrated by Rosana Faría, Playco Editores, Caracas, 2000
- Un caballo en la ciudad, illustrated with photographs by Rosa Virginia Urdaneta, Playco Editores, Caracas, 2002
- Ratón y Vampiro, illustrated by Jefferson Quintana, Lugar Común, 2012
- Era un tren de noche, illustrated by the same author, Cyls Editores, Caracas, 2018

=== Non-fiction ===
- Quién dijo Kartofel?, with Blanca Strepponi, Magenta Ediciones, Caracas, 2006
- Marie Curie, biografía, Los Libros de El Nacional, Caracas, 2005
- Nelson Mandela, Los Libros de El Nacional, Caracas, 2006
- Viaje al poscomunismo, with Ana Teresa Torres, Eclepsidra, Caracas, 2020.

=== Theatre ===
- La otredad y el vampiro, Fundarte, Alcaldía de Caracas, 1994
