= Lorna Hutson =

British professor of law and literature (born 1958)

Lorna Hutson FBA
- Born: 27 November 1958 (age 67); Berlin
- Occupation: Academic
- Title: Merton Professor of English Literature
- Awards: Guggenheim Fellowship (2004); British Academy Fellowship (2016)

Academic background
- Education: Somerville College, Oxford

Lorna Margaret Hutson, FBA (born 27 November 1958) is the ninth Merton Professor of English Literature and a fellow of Merton College, Oxford. Together with Professor John Hudson, she is a director of the Centre for Medieval and Early Modern Law and Literature at the University of St Andrews.

== Life and career ==
Hutson was born in Berlin on 27 November 1958, to John Whiteford Hutson, a British career diplomat, and his wife, Doris Kemp. She attended St Hilary's School, Edinburgh and Tormead School, Guildford. She studied at Somerville College, Oxford graduating with an MA (Hons) with first class honours, and received a DPhil in 1983.

Soon afterwards, Hutson became a junior research fellow at Victoria University of Wellington, New Zealand. From 1986 to 1998, she was a lecturer, then reader in English literature, at Queen Mary College, London. For the following two years she was professor of English literature at the University of Hull, and then spent four years as a professor in the English department of the University of California, Berkeley. In 2004, she returned to the UK to take up the position of Berry Professor of English Literature at the University of St Andrews. She was awarded a Guggenheim Fellowship the same year. Her book The Invention of Suspicion: Law and Mimesis in Shakespeare and Renaissance Drama won the Roland Bainton Prize for Literature in 2008. In 2012 Hutson was Dr Alice Griffin Fellow in Shakespearean Studies at the University of Auckland; she also gave the Oxford Wells Shakespeare Lectures, on the subject of "Circumstantial Shakespeare"; the lectures were published by Oxford University Press under the same title in 2015.

In 2016 she was elected as a fellow of the British Academy, in May gave the British Academy's Shakespeare Lecture, and in September took up the post of Merton Professor of English Literature, becoming a fellow of Merton College, Oxford.

Hutson is an honorary fellow of Somerville College. She was elected a fellow of the English Association in 2024.

== Publications ==
- Thomas Nashe in Context (1989) ISBN 9780198128762
- The Usurer's Daughter: Male Friendship and Fictions of Women in Sixteenth-Century England (1994) ISBN 0203215605
- Feminism and Renaissance Studies (editor, 1999) ISBN 9780198782438
- Rhetoric and Law in Early Modern Europe (co-editor, 2001) ISBN 0300084854
- The Invention of Suspicion: Law and Mimesis in Shakespeare and Renaissance Drama (2007) ISBN 9780199691487
- Circumstantial Shakespeare (2015) ISBN 9780198782438
- England's Insular Imagining: the Elizabethan Erasure of Scotland (2023) ISBN 9781009253574
