= Premio Casa de América de Poesía Americana =

Literary prize

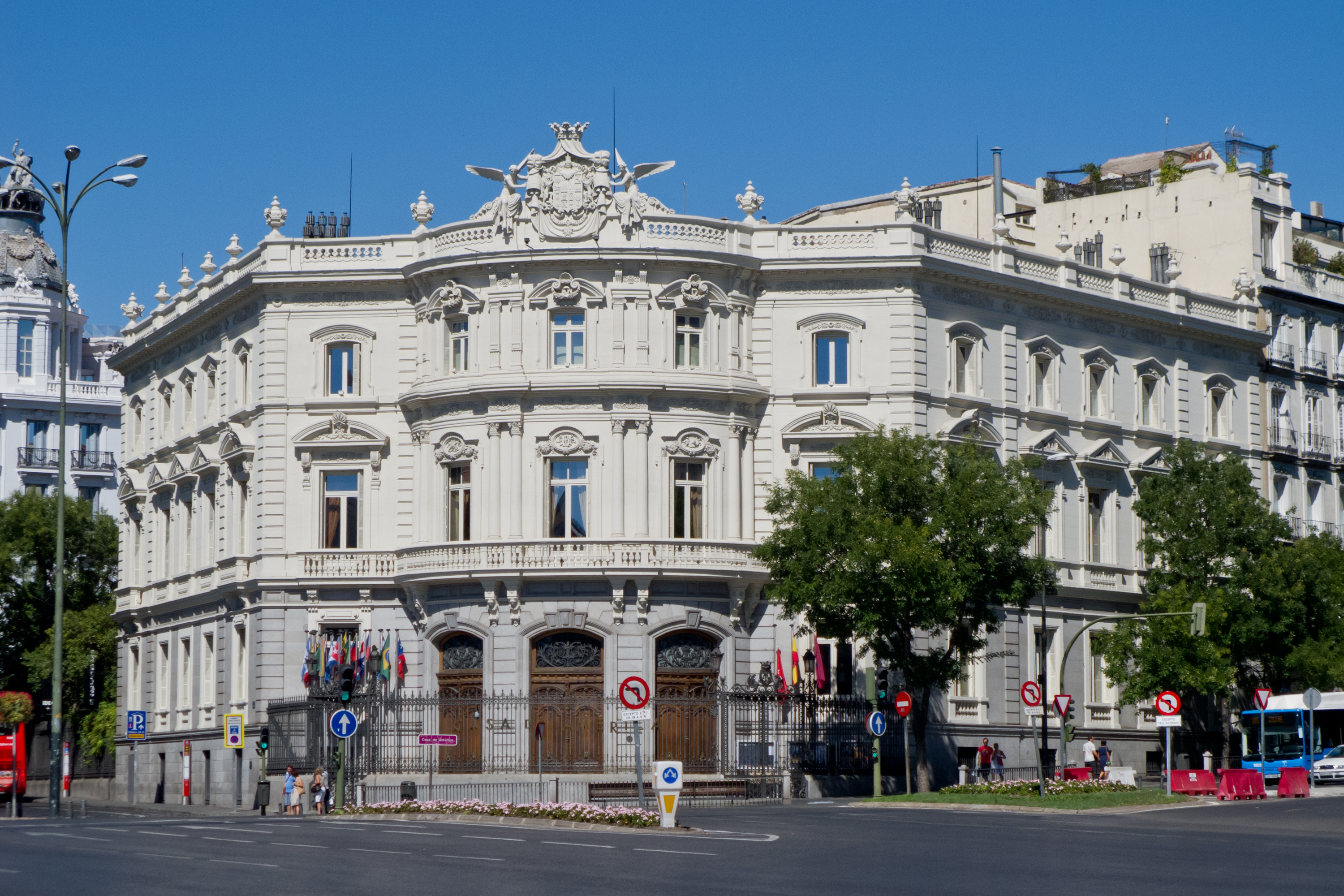
Palace of Linares (Madrid), headquarters of Casa de América

Premio Casa de América de Poesía Americana (Casa de América Prize for American Poetry) is a literary prize awarded by the Casa de América public consortium, "in order to stimulate new poetic writing in the Americas, with special attention to poems that open up or explore new perspectives and renovate themes". The prize, which awards unpublished works, has among its list of winners several important contemporary Latin American poets such as Yolanda Pantin, Piedad Bonnett, Carmen Boullosa, Eduardo Chirinos, and Rafael Courtoisie.

== Award winners ==
| Year | Country | Work | Author |
|---|---|---|---|
| 2001 | Peru | Breve historia de la música | Eduardo Chirinos |
| 2002 | Argentina | La vista | Claudia Masí |
| 2003 | Colombia | Colección privada | Ramón Cote |
| 2004 | Ecuador | Mordiendo el frío | Edwin Madrid |
| 2005 | Mexico | Viernes en Jerusalén | Marco Antonio Campos |
| 2006 | Chile | En un abrir y cerrar de ojos | Óscar Hahn |
| 2007 | Chile | Papeles de Harek Ayun | Omar Lara |
| 2008 | Argentina | Palma real | Jorge Boccanera |
| 2009 | Colombia | Biblia de pobres | Juan Manuel Roca |
| 2010 | Cuba | El rumbo de los días | Waldo Leyva |
| 2011 | Colombia | Explicaciones no pedidas | Piedad Bonnett |
| 2012 | Dominican Republic | Lenguaje del mar | José Mármol |
| 2013 | Argentina | Cuando todo calla | Hugo Mujica |
| 2014 | Uruguay | Parranda | Rafael Courtoisie |
| 2015 | Peru | Las musas se han ido de copas | Nilton Santiago |
| 2016 | El Salvador | Medianoche del mundo | Jorge Galán |
| 2017 | Venezuela | Lo que hace el tiempo | Yolanda Pantin |
| 2018 | Argentina | Los primeros indicios | Franco Bordino |
| 2019 | Mexico | La aguja en el pajar | Carmen Boullosa |
| 2020 | El Salvador | Los cines negros | Rolando Kattan |
| 2021 | Colombia | Se arrodillan para beber | Ángela García |
