= Beatriz Jaguaribe =

Brazilian comparative communications professor

Beatriz Jaguaribe is a professor of comparative communications in the School of Communications at the Universidade Federal do Rio de Janeiro and the recipient of a Guggenheim Fellowship.

Jaguaribe has written on race and visual culture in contemporary Brazil. Among her publications are Fins de Século: Cidade e Cultura no Rio de Janeiro (1998), published by Rocco, and Mapa do Maravilhoso do Rio de Janeiro (2001), published by Sextante Artes. Jaguaribe works on the relationship between artistic production and lived experiences in the production of cultural maps of urban Brazil.

In 2001 Jaguaribe was Visiting Chair in the Study of Brazilian Culture at the University of Notre Dame's Kellogg School of International Studies. She was awarded a Guggenheim Fellowship in 2004. In the 2012-2013 academic year Jaguaribe was the Andrés Bello Chair In Latin American Cultures And Civilizations at New York University's King Juan Carlos I of Spain Center.

Jaguaribe served as a contributing editor of Public Culture, a scholarly journal published by Duke University Press, and she serves as a Corresponding Editor for the International Journal of Urban and Regional Research (IJURR).
