= Susan L. Einbinder =

Susan L. Einbinder (born 1954) is an American Jewish historian. Einbinder researches Jewish history and Jewish literature in the Middle Ages, particularly in relation to the Black Death and other disasters.

== Biography ==
Susan Einbinder grew up in Wayne, New Jersey in a Jewish family. Both of her parents were scientists and came from families that had immigrated from Eastern Europe. She attended public schools while also receiving a Jewish education, studying Hebrew and Jewish history.

She earned a bachelor's degree in mathematics from Brown University in 1976. In 1983, she completed a master's degree in Hebrew literature and received rabbinic ordination from Hebrew Union College. In 1991, she earned a Ph.D. from the Department of English and comparative literature at Columbia University.

== Career ==
From 1993 to 2012, Einbinder served as Professor of Hebrew Literature at Hebrew Union College in Cincinnati, Ohio.

In 2012, she joined the Department of Literatures, Cultures, and Languages at the University of Connecticut, where she served as Professor of Hebrew and Judaic Studies.

In 2019, Einbinder was the Hirschfeld Visiting Professor at Brown University during the spring semester and a visiting professor at the Hebrew University of Jerusalem during the fall semester. During 2018–2019, she was also a visiting scholar at the Haifa Center for Mediterranean History of the University of Haifa."Hebrew University Course Catalog". shnaton.huji.ac.il.

Following her retirement in 2023, she served as a visiting scholar in the Department of Religious Studies at Brown University.

Einbinder has served on the editorial boards of several academic journals. She was elected a Fellow of the Medieval Academy of America and of the American Academy for Jewish Research.

== Social and Public Activities ==
Alongside her academic work, Einbinder has long been involved in activities promoting human rights, social justice, and peace. During the 1980s, she became acquainted with the work of Israeli and Palestinian peace organizations and participated in initiatives aimed at fostering dialogue and reconciliation in the Middle East. During periods when she resided in Israel, she took part in human-rights initiatives. After returning to the United States, she continued her public and community engagement in the areas of human rights, opposition to racism, opposition to capital punishment, and the promotion of dialogue among diverse communities.

== Research ==
Einbinder's research focuses on the Hebrew literature of medieval European Jewry, particularly in France, Provence, and the Iberian Peninsula. Her early work examined literary and liturgical forms of commemoration relating to persecution, expulsion, and psychological trauma among medieval Jews, and the contribution of literary and ritual texts to the reconstruction of Jewish history.

She has also studied Jewish responses to epidemics in Europe and North Africa, particularly the Black Death of the fourteenth century and the Great Italian Plague of 1631. Her work in this area emphasizes the social, environmental, and epidemiological contexts of Jewish experiences during epidemics, moving beyond the traditional focus on Jewish–non-Jewish relations.

== Awards ==
Einbinder has received numerous prestigious fellowships and research grants, including a Guggenheim Fellowship in 2004, as well as fellowships from the Institute for Advanced Study, the Cullman Center for Scholars and Writers at the New York Public Library, the National Humanities Center, and the University of Connecticut Humanities Institute.

== Books ==
- Yizhak HaGorni, Hebrew "Troubadour" from Provence, Hebrew Union College, 1983.
- Naso: Carrying On, Hebrew Union College, 1998.
- Beautiful Death: Jewish Poetry and Martyrdom in Medieval France, Princeton University Press, 2002.
- No Place of Rest: Jewish Literature, Expulsion, and the Memory of Medieval France, University of Pennsylvania Press, 2009.
- After the Black Death: Plague and Commemoration Among Iberian Jews, University of Pennsylvania Press, 2022.
- Writing Plague: Jewish Responses to the Great Italian Plague, University of Pennsylvania Press, 2022.
