= Ana Teresa Torres =

Venezuelan writer (born 1945)

- Born: 6 July 1945; Caracas, Venezuela
- Education: Psycologist
- Alma mater: Universidad Católica Andrés Bello
- Occupation: Novelist
- Writing career
- Language: Spanish
- Genres: Novel, historial fiction, science fiction
- Notable work: Doña Inés vs. Oblivion
- Notable awards: Pegasus Prize Anna Seghers Prize
- Website: anateresatorres.com

Ana Teresa Torres (born 6 July 1945) is a Venezuelan novelist, essayist and short story writer. Her writing, both fiction and non-fiction, is often concerned with Venezuelan history and politics, memory, gender, and psychoanalysis.

== Life ==
Torres was born in Caracas, Venezuela, and is a trained psychoanalyst. She studied psychology at Universidad Católica Andrés Bello in Caracas from 1964 to 1968, and gained a postgraduate qualification from the Centro de Salud Mental del Este de Caracas from 1970 to 1973. She has taught courses on both psychology and creative writing.

From 2006 to 2010, she coordinated the Semana de Nueva Narrativa Urbana (Week of New Urban Writing) with Héctor Torres, which led to the anthologies De la urba para el orbe (2006), Quince que cuentan (2008) and Tiempos de la ciudad (2010).

On 16 January 2006, Torres took up seat F in the Academia venezolana de la lengua (Venezuelan Academy of the Language).

== Bibliography ==
Novels

- La escribana del viento. Caracas: Alfa, 2013. ISBN 9789803543747 (Winner of the Premio de la crítica de la novela, 2013).
- La fascinación de la víctima. Caracas: Alfa, 2008. ISBN 9788417014735
- Nocturama. Caracas: Alfa, 2006. ISBN 9788417014711
- Dos novelas: El exilio del tiempo y Me abrazo tan largamente, Mérida: El otro, el mismo, 2005. ISBN 9789806523289
- El corazón del otro, Caracas: Alfadil 2005 ISBN 9788417014704
- Cuentos completos, Mérida: El otro el mismo, 2002
- La favorita del Señor, Caracas: Editorial Blanca Pantin / La nave va, 2001
- Los últimos espectadores del acorazado Potemkin, Caracas: Monte Ávila Editores, 1999.
- Malena de cinco mundos, Literal Books, 1997
- Vagas desapariciones. Caracas: Grijalbo, 1995
- Doña Inés contra el olvido. Caracas: Monte Ávila Editores, 1992. (Winner of the Bienal de Literatura Mariano Picón Salas Prize, 1991). ISBN 9780965445955
  - Doña Inés vs Oblivion. Translation by Gregory Rabassa. New York: Grove Press, 2000. ISBN 9780802137265
- El exilio del tiempo, Caracas: Monte Ávila Editores, 1990

Non fiction

- Diario en Ruinas (1998-2017). Caracas: Alfa, 2018. ISBN 9788417014803
- El oficio por dentro, Caracas: Alfa, 2012. ISBN 9788417014780
- Lya Imber de Coronil, Caracas: El Nacional, 2010.
- La herencia de la tribu, Caracas: Alfa, 2009. ISBN 9789803542849
- Historias del continente oscuro: Ensayos sobre la condición femenina, Caracas: Alfa 2007. ISBN 9788417014728
- El alma se hace de palabras, Caracas: Editorial Blanca Pantin, 2003.
- A beneficio de inventario, Caracas: Memorias de Altagracia, 2000.
- Territorios eróticos, Caracas: Editorial Psicoanalítica, 1998.
- El amor como síntoma, Caracas: Editorial Psicoanalítica, 1993.
- Elegir la neurosis, Caracas: Editorial Psicoanalítica, 1992.

In anthologies

- 'Casas abandonadas' (extract from El exilio del tiempo) in Alrededores de la casa edited by Yolanda Pantin and Federico Pacanins. Caracas: Colección Econoinvest, 2000.
- 'Retrato frente al mar' in Narradores de El Nacional (1946-1992). Caracas: Monte Ávila Editores, 1992; in Antología de cuentistas Hispanoamericanas edited by Gloria da Cunha-Giabbai and Anabella Acevedo-Leal. Washington, DC: Literal Books, 1996; in Cuentos que hicieron historia. Ganadores del concurso de cuentos del diario El Nacional 1946-2004. Caracas: Los Libros de El Nacional, 2005; in La vasta brevedad. Antología del cuento venezolano del siglo XX edited by Carlos Pacheco, Miguel Gomes and Antonio López Ortega. Caracas: Alfaguara, 2010: Vol. II.
- 'El vestido santo' in Las mujeres toman la palabra. Antología de narradoras venezolanas edited by Luz Marina Rivas. Caracas: Monte Ávila Latinoamericana, 2004; in Contar es un placer. Selección de cuentos hispanoamericanos edited by Emmanuel Tornés. Havana: Casa editora Abril, 2007.
