= Piedad Bonnett =

Colombian poet, playwright and novelist

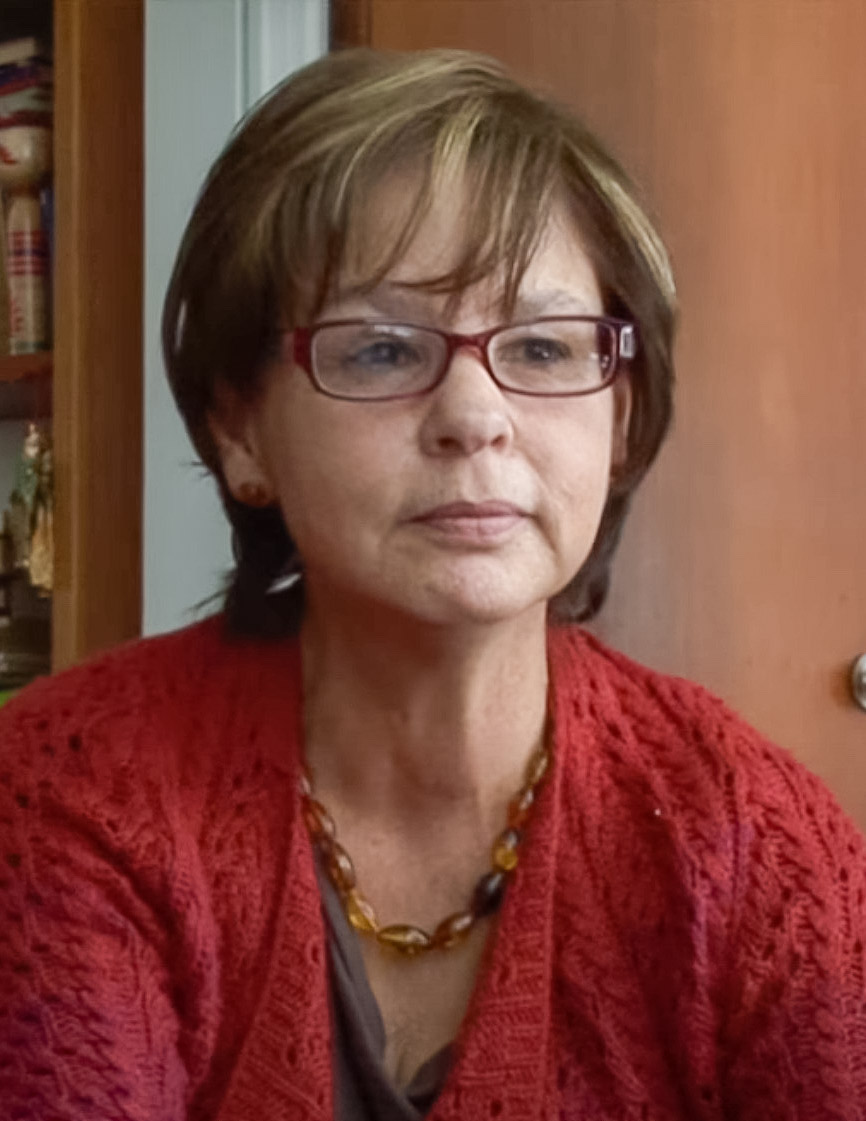
Bonnet in 2014.

Piedad Bonnett Vélez (Amalfi (Antioquia), 1951) is a Colombian poet, playwright and novelist.

== Biography ==
She obtained a degree in Philosophy and Literature from the University of Los Andes where she has been professor at the Faculty of Arts and Humanities since 1981. She has published eight poetry books, many of which have been translated to Italian, English, French, Swiss, Greek and Portuguese, four novels, and five theater plays. Her short stories and essays have been published in both Colombian and international magazines and newspapers, and she has represented Colombia in numerous poetry festivals in Granada (Spain), Córdoba (Spain), Rosario (Argentina) and Medellín (Colombia), and literary festivals, including the Berlin International Literature Festival and Hay Festival in Segovia.

Her poetry, screenwriting and prose are described as having a profound link to her life experiences and vision as a middle class woman in a country torn by violence, inequality and conflict. Childhood, family life, and an enchantment and disenchantment with different kinds of love are present across her work, including filial, romantic and friendship, which she describes as one of the most beautiful and pure kinds. In 2013, she published her book “Lo que no tiene nombre,” a personal testimony about the struggles of her son with mental illness. The book received excellent reviews and she received recognition from Semana, Fundación Liderazgo y Democracia y Telefónica for her leadership in generating consciousness about mental health issues through literature.

== Awards ==
- Honorary mention, Hispanic American Poetry Competition Octavio Paz, for De círculo y de ceniza
- Poetry National Prize, Instituto Colombiano de Cultura, 1994, for El hilo de los días
- 9th Premio Casa de América de Poesía Americana, 2011, for Explicaciones no pedidas
- Poetry prize Poets of the Latin World, 2012
- Writer of the year in Portal de Poesía Contemporánea, 2013
- Poetry Prize José Lezama Lima, 2014, for Explicaciones no pedidas
- Prize Generation of the 27, 2016, for Los habitados

== Books ==
=== Poetry ===
- De círculo y ceniza (On circle and ashes). 1989.
- Nadie en casa (Nobody at home). 1994.
- El hilo de los días (The drift of days). 1995.
- Ese animal triste (That sad animal). 1996.
- Todos los amantes son guerreros (All lovers are warriors). 1997.
- No es más que la vida (It’s no more than life). Arango Editores, 1998. ISBN 978-958-27-0021-8
- demás es silencio (the rest is silence). 2003.
- Tretas del débil (The weak’s ruses). 2004.
- Los privilegios del olvido, 2008
- Las herencias, 2008
- Explicaciones no pedidas, 2011

=== Novels ===
- Después de todo (After all). 2001.
- Para otros es el cielo (Heaven is for the others). 2004.
- Siempre fue invierno, Alfaguara, 2007, ISBN 978-958-704-552-9
- El prestigio de la belleza, 2010
- Lo que no tiene nombre, (Alfaguara ) 2013
- Qué hacer con estos pedazos, Alfaguara 2021

=== Plays ===
- Gato por liebre, teatro 1991
- Se arrienda pieza, theatre
- Sanseacabó, theatre
- Gato por liebre, theatre 1991
- Algún día nos iremos 2013

=== Essays ===
- El hilo de los días, 1995
- Que muerde el aire afuera, 1997
- Imaginación y oficio, 2003
