= Eduardo Chirinos =

- Born: April 4, 1960; Lima, Peru
- Died: February 17, 2016 (aged 55)
- Education: Pontifical Catholic University of Peru (Bachelor's degree); Rutgers University (PhD)
- Occupations: Professor of literature at the University of Montana, poet
- Awards: Premio Casa de América de Poesía Americana

Eduardo Alejandro Chirinos Arrieta (4 April 1960 – 17 February 2016) was a Peruvian professor of literature at the University of Montana, and a poet. He received the Premio Casa de América de Poesía Americana in 2001.

== Career ==
Eduardo Chirinos was born in Lima, in 1960. He studied Hispanic linguistics, acquiring a bachelor's degree from Pontificia Universidad Católica del Perú, and a PhD in literature at Rutgers University.

He was a professor in the department of Modern and Classical Languages and Literatures at the University of Montana, specializing in Latin American Literature, Modernism, Avant-Garde, Spanish and Latin American Contemporary Poetry.
