= Emma Dodd =

English author and illustrator (born 1969)

Emma Dodd (born 1969) is an English author and illustrator. She is best known for her children's books published by Orchard Books, Templar Publishing, Penguin Books, Macmillan Publishers (United States), Simon & Schuster, HarperCollins (US), Scholastic Corporation (US and UK) and Nosy Crow.

== Biography ==
Emma Dodd was born in 1969 in Guildford, the daughter of designers Robert Dodd and Fay Hillier. She attended Tormead School, Kingston Polytechnic, where she did a Foundation Course in Art and Design, and then Central Saint Martins College of Art and Design, London graduating in graphic design and illustration in 1992.

During the early part of her career, Emma worked in advertising and editorial, for clients including Volvo, BMW, Pentagram (NYC and London), Royal Botanic Gardens (Kew), The Guardian, The Observer, Daily Express and She.

At the same time, she began to illustrate children's books. Today, illustrating and writing children's picture books is the focus of Emma's career.

Emma Dodd illustrated the award-winning Amazing Baby series for Templar, was selected as a winner in the 2010 Booktrust Early Years Awards for I Love My Mummy, written by Giles Andreae (Purple Ronnie) and is nominated for the 2011 Kate Greenaway Medal for her book, I Love Bugs.

Emma Dodd lives in Surrey with her husband and two children.
