= Tormead School =

Location
- 27 Cranley Road; Guildford, Surrey, GU1 2JD; England; 51.2429°N 0.5556°W

Information
- Type: Private day school
- Religious affiliation: Inter- / non- denominational
- Established: 1905
- Local authority: Surrey
- Department for Education URN: 125345 Tables
- Headteacher: David Boyd
- Gender: Girls
- Age: 4 to 18
- Enrolment: 790
- Houses: Wellington, Livingston, Nelson and Nightingale
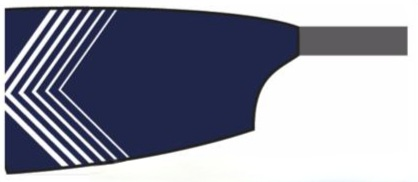
- Boat Club: Tormead Boat Club Tormead Boat Colours
- Website: www.tormeadschool.org.uk

Tormead School is a private day school for girls aged 4–18 years old in Guildford, Surrey, England. It comprises a reception, prep school, senior school and sixth form. It was founded in 1905 and is a member of the Headmasters' and Headmistresses' Conference (HMC) and Girls Schools Association (GSA).

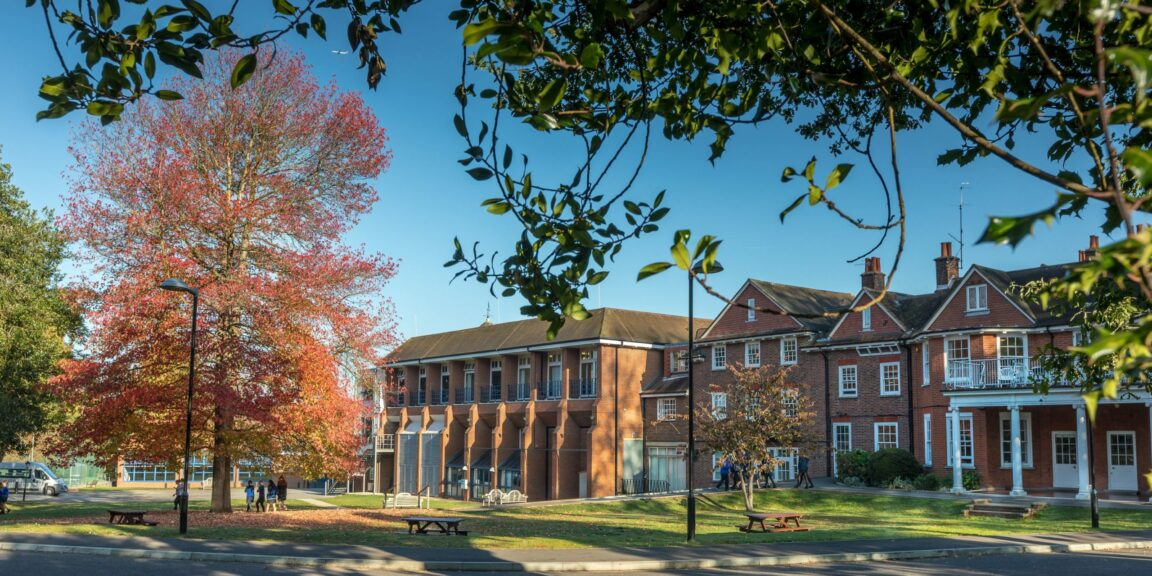
Tormead School buildings c.2022

== History ==
Tormead School was founded in 1905 in a residential area of Guildford. Starting with a mere handful of girls and a teacher in a private house, the school survived the threat of a takeover in 1912 and near financial collapse in 1935. Tormead survived these vicissitudes to grow in size during the two World Wars, led by a succession of Headmistresses. David Boyd, the current Head, is the first male Headteacher of Tormead since the school's inception.

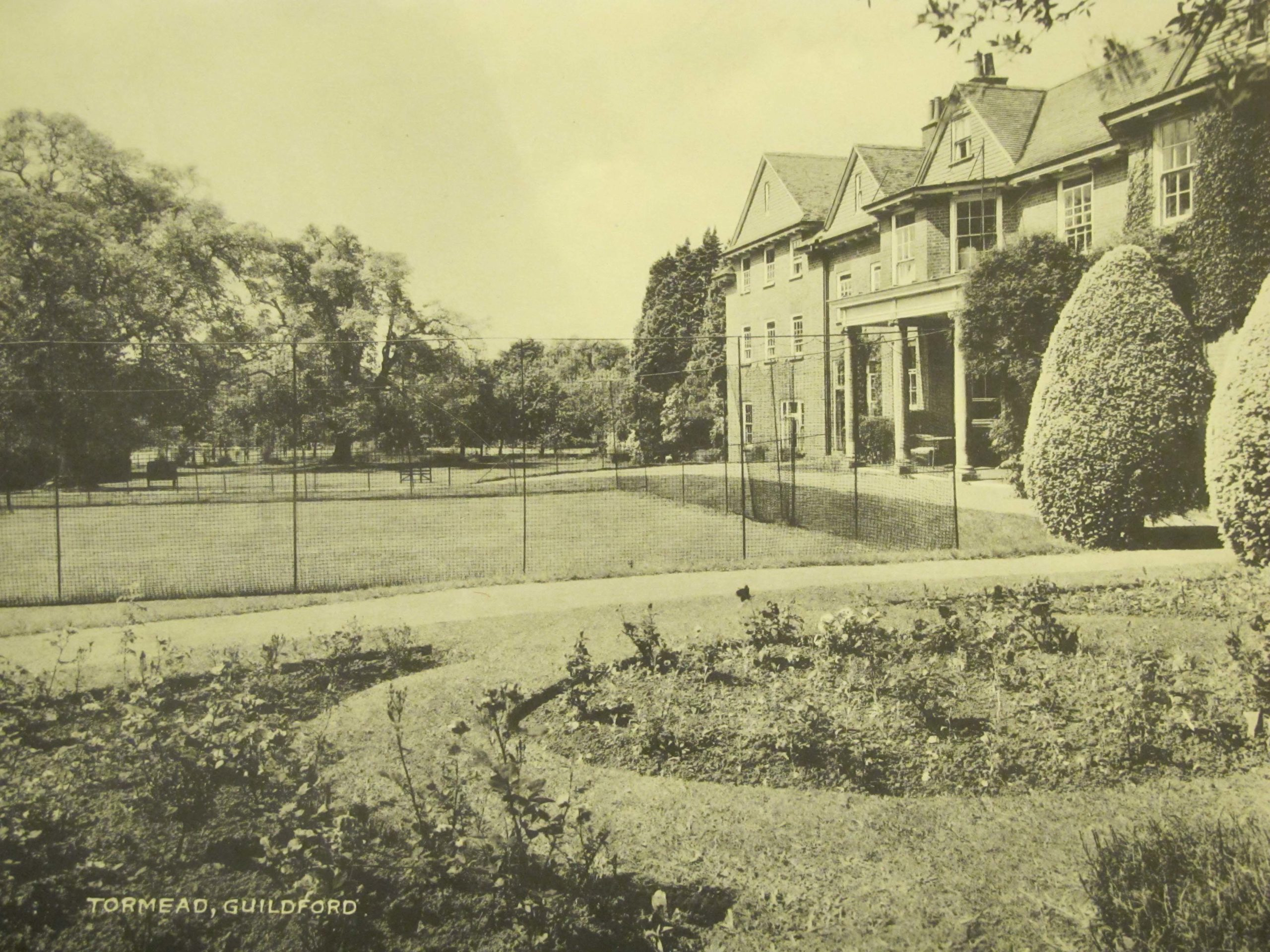
Tormead School in the early part of the 20th Century.

Additions to the building include Alleyne House in the Junior School (named after former headmistress, Honor Alleyne), the science wing, and specialist design technology, home economics and textiles rooms. In 2008, construction was completed on a new performing arts centre.

In 2015 developments took place, with the addition of an atrium to the old school house and a refit of classroom facilities and library.

In 2022 planning permission was granted for the development of the Tormead Urn Field Sports Ground, 5 minutes from the main school site. Despite fierce opposition from local residents, the new sports facility is due for completion in 2024 and will provide Hockey, Football, Rugby, Cricket and Athletics facilities for Tormead School, their partner state school, Guildford County School and a variety of local clubs and sporting groups.

== Extra-curricular activities ==
Particular sporting activities at the school include swimming (a number of students may have competed at both national and international level prior to 2015), gymnastics (the school has previously won the European Championships for Schools, GISGA) and fencing (the school may have competed nationally and some members of the squad represented Great Britain internationally prior to 2015).

The school has a Music Department. Four orchestras and four choirs operate within the school, as well a Jazz Band, which tours Europe during the summer every two years and has played at numerous events and locations. The school has held musical events to celebrate its 90-year anniversary, the turn of the millennium and its centenary. Formal music events are arranged throughout the school year, with male singers for vocal performances often "borrowed" from the Royal Grammar School, Guildford.

Other extra-curricular activities are Young Enterprise, Young Consumer, The Duke of Edinburgh's Award, public speaking and debating. The debating squad frequently enter the Cambridge, Oxford and Mace debating competitions. In 2009, they also were picked as one of the first schools in Britain to take part in the YPI project (Youth Philanthropy Initiative).

== Notable former pupils ==
The school has an active alumnae association, TOGA, the Tormead Old Girls' Association and Parents' Association.

- Andrea Byrne, ITV newsreader
- Emma Dodd, illustrator
- Lorna Hutson, academic
- Riva Taylor, singer
- Sandi Toksvig, writer and broadcaster
