= Xiao Cheng Zeng =

Chinese scientist

- 曾晓成
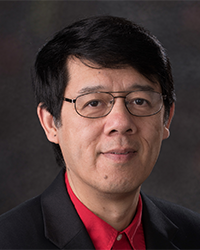
- Education: Peking University; Ohio State University
- Known for: Computational chemistry
- Awards: Fellow of John Simon Guggenheim Memorial Foundation; Fellow of American Physical Society; Fellow of American Association for the Advancement of Science; Fellow of Royal Society of Chemistry; Fellow of Materials Research Society; Foreign Fellow of European Academy of Sciences
- Scientific career
- Fields: Physical chemistry; Nanomaterials
- Workplaces: City University of Hong Kong; University of Nebraska–Lincoln

Xiao Cheng Zeng is a scientist in the fields of physical chemistry and materials science. He is the Head of the Department of Materials Science and Engineering and a Chair Professor of Materials Chemistry and Chemical Engineering at City University of Hong Kong. He also holds the title of Emeritus Chancellor's University Professor at the University of Nebraska–Lincoln.

Zeng is a fellow of the American Association for the Advancement of Science, the American Physical Society, the Materials Research Society, and the Royal Society of Chemistry. He is also a foreign fellow of the European Academy of Sciences and has previously been awarded a John Simon Guggenheim Fellowship.

== Education ==
Zeng received his bachelor's degree in physics from Peking University in 1984. He subsequently pursued postgraduate study in the United States through the CUSPEA programme, created by Nobel laureate in physics Tsung-Dao Lee, and obtained his Ph.D. in condensed matter physics from the Ohio State University in 1989. He then conducted postdoctoral research in physical chemistry at the University of Chicago (1989–1992) and the University of California, Los Angeles (1992–1993).

== Career and research ==
Zeng's research focuses on computational physical chemistry, with contributions in the areas of thermodynamics and phase transitions of nanoconfined water and ice, water–surface interactions and wetting, gold-cluster science and nanocatalysis, atmospheric reactions, and the computational design of low-dimensional materials.

=== Low-dimensional ice and ice hydrates ===
In 1997, Zeng predicted a two-dimensional bilayer hexagonal ice structure, later nicknamed the "Nebraska ice," a novel phase of water ice. The prediction was confirmed experimentally by the Pacific Northwest National Laboratory in 2009 and Peking University in 2020. This phase is now referred to as two-dimensional ice I. Zeng also proposed theoretical models for one-dimensional ice nanotubes (I–III), "DNA-ice," ferroelectric ice-χ, and two-dimensional amorphous, plastic, twisted (bilayer moiré) and superionic ice phases, thereby expanding the known family of ice structures.

=== Gold-cluster science and nanocatalysis ===
In 2006, Zeng and his collaborators reported the discovery of the first all-metal cage molecules (Au_{16-18}). He subsequently investigated the size, structure, and catalytic activity relationships of more than 20 gold clusters and developed a unified model to explain the structures of over 70 ligand-protected gold clusters.

=== Atmospheric reactions ===
Since 2015, Zeng has identified several new chemical reactions occurring on water and cloud droplets, with implications for atmospheric new-particle formation and haze chemistry.

=== Computational design of low-dimensional materials ===
In 2011, Zeng predicted more than 20 metallic boron monolayer structures and introduced a systematic naming scheme for these monolayers, including the α, β, χ, and δ series. Two of these, χ_{3}-borophene and β_{12}-borophene, were later confirmed experimentally.

== Publications and citations ==
Zeng has authored more than 740 journal articles, which have received over 63,000 citations according to Google Scholar (h-index 126) and over 54,000 citations according to Web of Science (h-index 111). His publications include seven articles in Nature and Science, 32 in their affiliated journals (including Nature Physics/Materials/Energy/Nanotechnolgy/Photonics, etc.), 26 in Proceedings of the National Academy of Sciences (PNAS), 75 in the Journal of the American Chemical Society (JACS), 22 in Angewandte Chemie, nine in Physical Review Letters and Physical Review X, and four in Joule and Chem.

== Prizes and Honours ==
- Fellow, John Simon Guggenheim Memorial Foundation (2004)
- Fellow, American Physical Society (2005)
- Fellow, American Association for the Advancement of Science (2007)
- Outstanding Research and Creative Activity Award, University of Nebraska (System Wide) (2010)
- Midwest Award, American Chemical Society (2011)
- Excellence in Graduate Education, Graduate College, UNL (2012)
- Outstanding Postdoc Mentor Award, UNL (2013)
- Fellow, Royal Society of Chemistry (2013)
- Surfaces & Interfaces Award, Royal Society of Chemistry (2017)
- Fellow, Materials Research Society (2019)
- Highly Cited Researcher, Clarivate Web of Science (2019, 2020, 2021, 2022, 2023, 2024)
- Foreign Fellow, European Academy of Sciences, Chemistry Division (2020)
