= Chiapas Media Project =

Mexican NGO

Chiapas Media Project was formerly known by the Spanish name Proyecto de Medios en Chiapas. The organization is now a Mexican NGO known as ProMedios de Comunicacion Comunitaria (Promedios.) It is now part of the Americas Media Initiative (AMI) and is solely a distributor of CMP/Promedios documentaries.

== History ==
The Chiapas Media Project (CMP) was founded in 1998 by Alexandra Halkin and Paco Vazquez. CMP collaborated with indigenous filmmakers from Oaxaca in creating a program to teach video and computer skills to the autonomous Zapatista communities focusing on the communities of Morelia, Oventic, Roberto Barrios and La Realidad, and to provide video cameras, editing equipment, and computers. Special training programs have focused on the empowerment of women.

Extensive documentation of the Zapatistas indigenous movement includes hundreds of videos, films, books, and websites created by external researchers and journalists. The introduction of CMP project represented efforts by the autonomous Zapatista communities to tell their own stories, in their own languages and from their own perspectives.

== Work ==
With CMP, the Zapatista communities have produced videos on agricultural collectives, fair trade coffee, women's collectives, autonomous education, traditional healing, and the history of their struggle for land. With the Community Human Rights Defenders Network, CMP produced a video about the work of this group to educate other communities. Videos produced with Community Human Rights Devenders Network were used as evidence in court proceedings related to human rights abuses, resulting in compensation to indigenous families. In Guerrero, CMP worked with the Organization of Campesino Environmentalists to document and draw attention to the destruction of virgin forests in the region.

CMP/Promedios built four media centers in the state of Chiapas, including facilities for video production and satellite internet access. Zapatista videos have been screened at film festivals, college and university campuses, and other locations across the globe. Training was provided out of a CMP Media Center in San Cristobal de las Casas.

CMP organized delegations of youth from the United States to meet with human rights, religious, and women's organizations, travelling to other communities to screen current productions and meet with other indigenous groups.
