= European Review of Latin American and Caribbean Studies =

Academic journal

The European Review of Latin American and Caribbean Studies (ERLACS) (Spanish: Revista Europea de Estudios Latinoamericanos y del Caribe) is an open access, peer-reviewed academic journal published semi-annually by the Centre for Latin American Research and Documentation in Amsterdam, which serves as a hub for Latin American research in Europe. Articles in English and Spanish present empirical research and theoretical innovation in social sciences and history. The journal also features book reviews, institutional news, and film reviews.

The journal underwent several title changes over the years. It was initially known as the Boletín Informativo Sobre Estudios Latinoamericanos en Europa from 1965 to 1969, then as the Boletín de Estudios Latinoamericanos from 1970 to 1973. From 1974 to 1989, it became the Boletín de Estudios Latinoamericanos y del Caribe. Since 1989, it has been titled the European Review of Latin American and Caribbean Studies / Revista Europea de Estudios Latinoamericanos y del Caribe.
