= Laura Ackerman Smoller =

Historian

Laura Ackerman Smoller is an American scholar of medieval history and religion at the University of Rochester and a Fellow of the Medieval Academy of America. She is the author of The Saint and the Chopped-Up Baby: The Cult of Vincent Ferrer in Medieval and Early Modern Europe (2014), which was awarded the 2016 La corónica book award, and History, Prophecy, and the Stars: The Christian Astrology of Pierre d'Ailly, 1350-1420 (1994). After undergraduate study at Dartmouth College, she received a Ph.D. in history from Harvard University in 1991. She taught at Stanford University and the University of Arkansas for many years before joining the faculty at the University of Rochester in 2014. She is currently the president of the Hagiography Society, dedicated to the study of the history of sanctity and sainthood. Her research has been supported by the National Endowment for the Humanities and the Guggenheim Foundation.

== Works ==
- The Saint and the Chopped-Up Baby: The Cult of Vincent Ferrer in Medieval and Early Modern Europe (2014)
- History, Prophecy, and the Stars: The Christian Astrology of Pierre D'Ailly, 1350-1420 (1994)
