= Margo Todd =

American historian (born 1950)

- Born: July 24, 1950 (age 76)
- Education: Tufts University (BA); Washington University in St. Louis; (PhD)
- Occupations: Walter H. Annenberg Professor of History Emerita, University of Pennsylvania

Margo Todd (born July 24, 1950) is an American historian.

== Education ==
Todd obtained an undergraduate degree from Tufts University and attended the Washington University in St. Louis, where she earned a master's degree and doctorate.

== Career ==
Todd joined the Vanderbilt University faculty. In 2003, Todd began teaching at the University of Pennsylvania as the Walter H. Annenberg Professor of History. Todd was awarded a Guggenheim fellowship in 2004.
