= Waikerí =

Indigenous people of Venezuela

The Waikerí or Guaiquerí (also spelled Guaiquirí or Guayquerí; Spanish plural guaiqueríes) are an indigenous people of northern Venezuela. Their exonym, in several Cariban languages, either means 'men' or 'people'. The Waikeri are believed to be related to Caribs and Warao people. The Waikerí primarily live on Venezuela's coastal island of Isla Margarita. Historically, they also lived on Cubagua, Coche and in the nearby coastal areas of the mainland, such as the Araya Peninsula around Cumaná. There is debate around the presence of Waikeri in the Northern Range of Trinidad. In the 2001 census, 2,767 people on Margarita self-identified as Guaiquerí. The Waikeri language has been extinct since the 1700s and the nation today speaks Spanish.

== Name ==
The Spanish used the name "Guaiqueri" and its variants to refer to a variety of fishing peoples living along the southern coasts of the Caribbean Sea, not just the modern Waikeri. The term is first documented in 1545, as quayquiríes, in the juicio de residencia of the licenciado Juan de Frías on Margarita. Cognates meaning 'man' or 'human being' are attested across the Cariban language family. A folk etymology deriving the name from a supposed answer guaike, guaike ('pointed stick', i.e. harpoon) given to Columbus's companions has been debunked in favor of the Cariban etymology. The spelling Waikerí, based on a phonetic orthography, is common in the international literature, while the community itself has reclaimed the Hispanicized form Guaiquerí in preference to IPA-based spellings.

== Language ==
Curt Nimuendajú classified the Waikeri language as unclassified because of a "lack of sufficient linguistic data." Douglas Taylor (1977) also mentions that Waikeri is among the virtually unattested languages of South America. Mason (1950) mentions various claims of Waikeri being either Cariban or related to Warao. Heinen thinks both Cariban and Waroid languages were spoken, with the Cariban language being a local lingua franca while the native language of the Waikeri was related to Warao. Rybka argues for a language shift from a Warao related language to a Cariban language late in Waikeri history.

There have at least 2 historical instances of Waikeri people being able to speak with speakers of Cariban languages. In 1800, Waikeri elders stated that neither their community living in Cumana nor the Waikeri on Isla Margarita had spoken their language in roughly a century. Numerous Indigenous words survived in local Spanish dialects: toponyms such as Pampatar ('house of salt'), Paraguachí ('place in the sea') and Cocheima ('place of deer'), and everyday terms such as guacuco (a clam), botuto and guarura (shell trumpets), mara and mapire (baskets), manare and sebucán (manioc-processing implements), aripo (griddle), cachapa and piache (shaman).

=== Cariban ===
Jose Alvarez and Čestmír Loukotka argue the Waikeri spoke Cumanagoto and grouped the Waikeri language with other Cariban languages close to Cumanagoto. Lafee-Wilbert et al. argues their language was within choto maimur ('the language of the people'), a Cariban dialect continuum of the Venezuelan coast that also included Cumanagoto, Chaima, and the Caraca language of the central coast. One point of evidence used for a Cariban affiliation is from a 1550 episode where the Margarita captain Juan de Salas, captured by Island Caribs near Puerto Rico, was able communicate with them. Similarly, one phrase in a conversation with a Waikerí man, Cuaca Patrì, ana, rote, Carinà acusinimbo, held in the Karina language, is recorded in Joseph Gumilla's (1745) book El Orinoco ilustrado y defendido. Heinen concurs that the Waikeri spoke a Cariban language, they spoke it as a trade language to communicate with their many Cariban-speaking neighbors. Rybka argues that the Waikeri shifted to using a Cariban language late in their history.

=== Waroid ===
Rybka and Romero-Figueroa argue that "...Guaiqueri from the island of Margarita may have spoken related languages [to Warao.]" Voegelin and Voegelin state that Waikeri was likely a dialect or sister language to Warao. Mason (1950) and Douglas Taylor (1977) also mention a suggested grouping of Waikeri with Warao. Alexander von Humboldt during his expedition to New Spain, was told by Waikerí elders that their language was related to Warao. Heinen views it as likely that the native language of the Waikeri and their ancestors was related to Warao. Rybka states that the ancestral language of the Waikeri was related to Warao, citing local toponyms and Waikeri oral tradition.

== History ==
=== Early history ===
Shell-mound (conchero) sites on Cubagua, Macanao and the Sucre coast show that nonagricultural fishing peoples who didn't produce pottery lived in the region from at least 2340 BC to 1745 BC, their material culture is called Manicuaroid. From about AD 100–420, Saladoid and Barrancoid pottery and other goods show up in the region. A third unique material culture arrived from the Orinoco–llanos region around AD 1000–1280 and the makers of that material culture became the dominant genetic contributor. Earlier populations likely merged with newcomers through intermarriage, as suggested by the genetic diversity of modern Waikeri and their neighbors. During the colonial period Waikeri elders told Alexander Humboldt that their people belong to the Warao nation. Due to them being Warao-like fishers, they may have lived in a symbiotic relationship with their more agricultural neighbors, like existed between fishers and agriculturalists in the country of the Caquetio.

At the end of the 15th century the Waikeri inhabited Margarita, Coche and Cubagua and the Sucre coast from Cumaná to Paria. A 1553 Spanish colonial testimony also describes the Northern Range of Trinidad as inhabited by people "of nation and language guaiquerí" who may or may not have been the same culture due to inconsistent Spanish usage of the term 'Guaiqueri'. The Waikeri were expert fishers, turtle hunters and navigators who traded salted fish, pearls, salt from Pampatar and Araya, hayo leaves, pottery and basketwork with neighbouring peoples, and their villages included coastal fishing, inland farming and mixed use sites.

=== Spanish rule ===
After first contact in 1498–1499, the Guaiquerí traded pearls with the settlers of Cubagua and, unlike most Venezuelan indigenous peoples, were less likely to be enslaved or encomended: royal cédulas repeatedly declared them free vassals, and the king addressed them as his "dear, noble and loyal Guaiqueríes". Their archers, famous for using poisoned arrows, served as militias defending the islands against corsairs and rival powers – against the French at Cubagua in 1528, Lope de Aguirre in 1561, John Burg in 1593, William Parker in 1601, the Dutch at Araya and La Tortuga in the 1620s–1630s and William Jackson in 1642 – and were honoured with the treatment of hidalgos and "knights". Their communities were organized as pueblos de doctrina and later resguardos with their own cabildos, alcaldes and regidores, and they successfully litigated for their lands and waters throughout the colonial period.

One of the most famous colonial figure of Waikeri history is the mestizo Francisco Fajardo, son of the Margarita leader Isabel (herself granddaughter of previous leader Paraguarime and of Charamaya, a ruler of the Maya valley on the central coast). In 1560 Fajardo founded the settlement of San Francisco in the valley of the Toromaima; colonial testimonies and a 1563 royal cédula of Philip II treat this as the first founding of what is now Caracas. Fajardo was executed at Cumaná in 1564 by the alcalde Alonso Cobos. Around 1800, when Alexander Humboldt visited the Waikeri country, the Waikeri had their own neighborhood in Cumana.

=== Venezuelan rule ===
During the wars of independence, the Guaiquerí joined the patriots of Juan Bautista Arismendi and crewed the republican Flota Sutil; Mariano Montilla praised the "inexhaustible stock of excellent sailors, the guaiqueríes". Large numbers fell at the battles of Matasiete (1817) and the Fuerte de Juan Griego, and the heroism displayed there inspired the name of the state of Nueva Esparta. In the 19th and 20th centuries they remained a people of fishermen, sailors, potters (El Cercado, Manicuare), hammock weavers and pearl divers – a group of Guaiquerí divers even worked the Red Sea pearl banks in 1934–1935 – while defending the remaining communal lands until the resguardos were partitioned under the 1904 law (only El Poblado escaped division).

In the 2001 census, 2,767 inhabitants of Margarita self-identified as Guaiquerí (86% of them in Porlamar's Caserío Fajardo), and the 2011 census gave between about 1,700 and 2,200. Others claim far higher figures (some 15,000 in Caserío Fajardo alone in a 2015 communal roll) and attribute the low official numbers to undercounting. Strong local identities persist, expressed for instance in the phrase guaiquerí rajao ('thoroughbred Guaiquerí'), and the Comunidad de Indígenas "Francisco Fajardo" continues to act as the collective's representative body.

== Culture ==
The Waikerí used a matrilineal kinship system with a preference for cross-cousin marriage and matrilocal residence. When getting married the new husband owed a period of "bride service" to his wife's family. Women could hold leadership positions, as in the case of the historical leaders such as Isabel. Nowadays Waikeri use both their mother's and father's sides of the family.

Like the Warao, Waikeri lifeways relied heavily on fishing, with agriculture being peripheral. Fishing, boat-building and basketwork (mara, mapire, manare, sebucán) were predominantly male tasks, while pottery – coil-built, open-fired and often red-slipped – cotton spinning and hammock weaving were women's crafts. They were successful fishers of a variety of creatures such as turtles and butterflyfish, harpooning fish with poles of macana palm tipped with sharp points and moving in dugout pirogues able to hold eighteen people; they ate coconuts, calabash and bananas, hunted armadillo, dived for pearls, and cultivated maize, bitter manioc (processed into casabe), batata (chaco), squash and ají. Their musical instruments included bone flutes, drums, shell rattles and the sacred botuto trumpet, and their religious specialists, the piaches, cured by sucking, vomiting and tobacco trances.

For the first three centuries of colonial rule the Guaiquerí kept their ancestral cults at places such as the cave of Cerro El Piache. Around the independence era they adopted the Virgin of the Valley, whom they incorporated into their own cosmology as the "Virgen Patriota" or "Reina Guaiquerí", honouring her on 9 September, the "Day of the Guaiquerí", celebrated since 1952.

Serological research found the Guaiquerí to be Diego (DI*A) positive at a mid-high frequency, similar to Cariban-speaking peoples, while the Warao are Diego negative; Layrisse and Wilbert concluded that a exclusively Warao genetic affiliation was "practically impossible."

== See also ==
- Garifuna
- Igneri
- Isabel
- Kalinago
- Lokono
- Mariche
- Palikur
- Timoto and Cuica

== Sources ==
- Ayala Lafée-Wilbert, Cecilia; Rivas Gómez, Pedro; Wilbert, Werner (2017). Caballeros del mar: los Guaiquerí, un pueblo con historia. Caracas: Academia de la Historia del Estado Nueva Esparta. ISBN 978-980-7090-22-3.
- von Humboldt, Alexander (1859). Reise in die Äquinoctial-Gegunden des Neuen Kontinents. Vol. Band 1. Translated by Hauff, Hermann. Stuttgart: J. G. Cotta'scher Verlag.
- Campbell, Lyle; Grondona, Verónica (2012). The Indigenous Languages of South America: A Comprehensive Guide. Walter de Gruyter. ISBN 978-3110255133.
- Voegelin, C. F.; Voegelin, F. M. (October 1965). "Languages of the World: Native America Fascicle Two". Anthropological Linguistics. 7 (7). Indiana University Department of Anthropology: 1–150. JSTOR 30022533.
- Heinen, H. Dieter; García-Castro, Álvaro (Autumn 2000). "The Multiethnic Network of the Lower Orinoco in Early Colonial Times". Ethnohistory. 47 (3–4). Duke University Press: 561–579. doi:10.1215/00141801-47-3-4-561.
- Boomert, Arie (2000). Trinidad, Tobago, and the Lower Orinoco Interaction Sphere: An Archaeological/Ethnohistorical Study. Universiteit Leiden. ISBN 978-90-90-13632-5.
- Rybka, Konrad; Sabogal, Andrés (2025). The future of the Caribbean past: towards a research agenda for contact linguistics.
