= Coffee production in Venezuela =

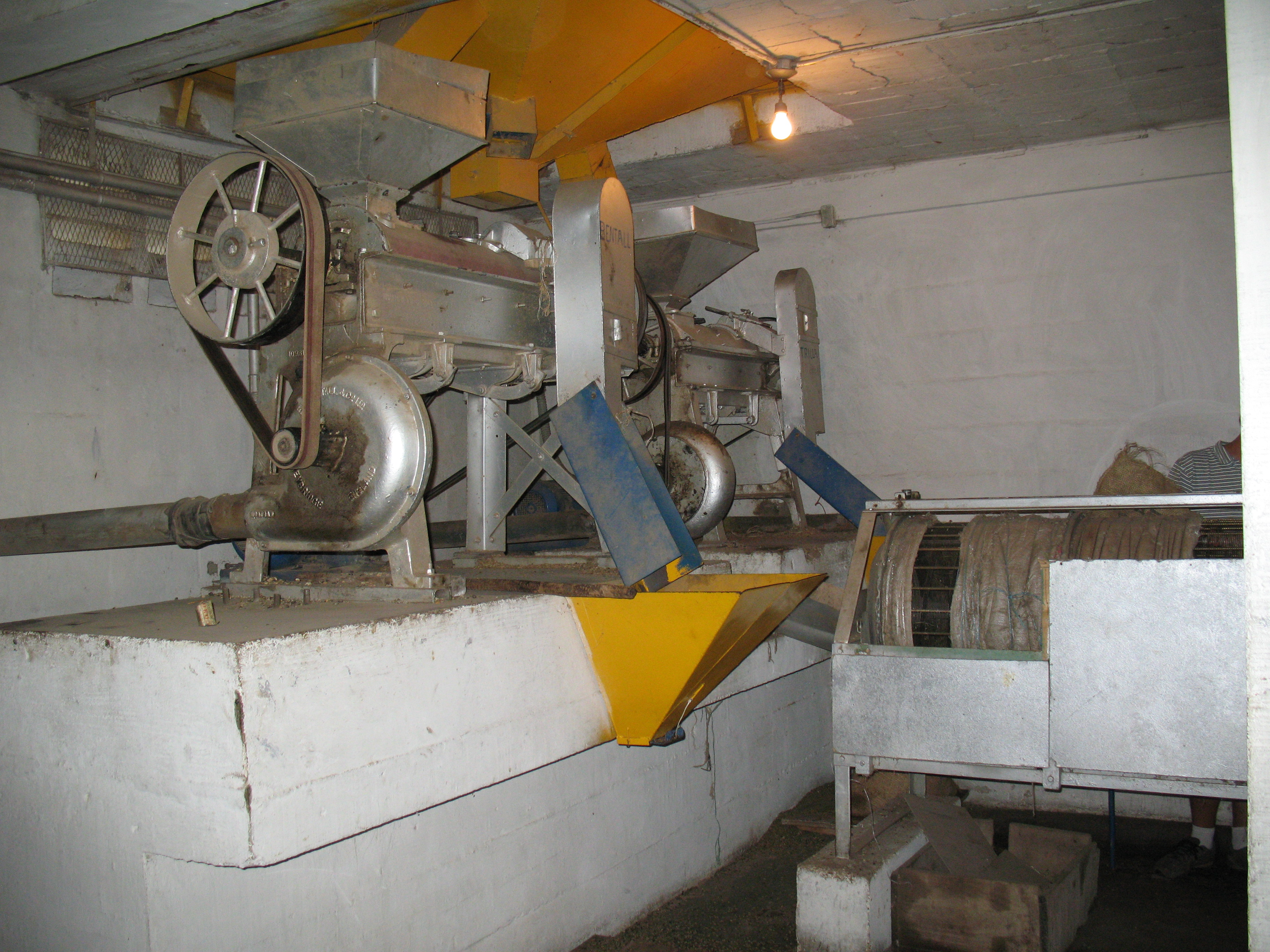
Coffee production in Venezuela

Coffee production in Venezuela began in the late eighteenth and early nineteenth centuries in the premontane region of the Andes Mountains. José Gumilla, a Jesuit priest, is credited with introducing coffee into Venezuela, in 1732. Its production is attributed to the large demand for the product, coupled with cheap labour and low land costs. It was first exported to Brazil. Coffee production in Venezuela led to the "complex migration" of people to this region in the late nineteenth century. Though Venezuela was ranked close to Colombia at one time in coffee production, by 2001, it produced less than one percent of the world's coffee.

== Geography ==
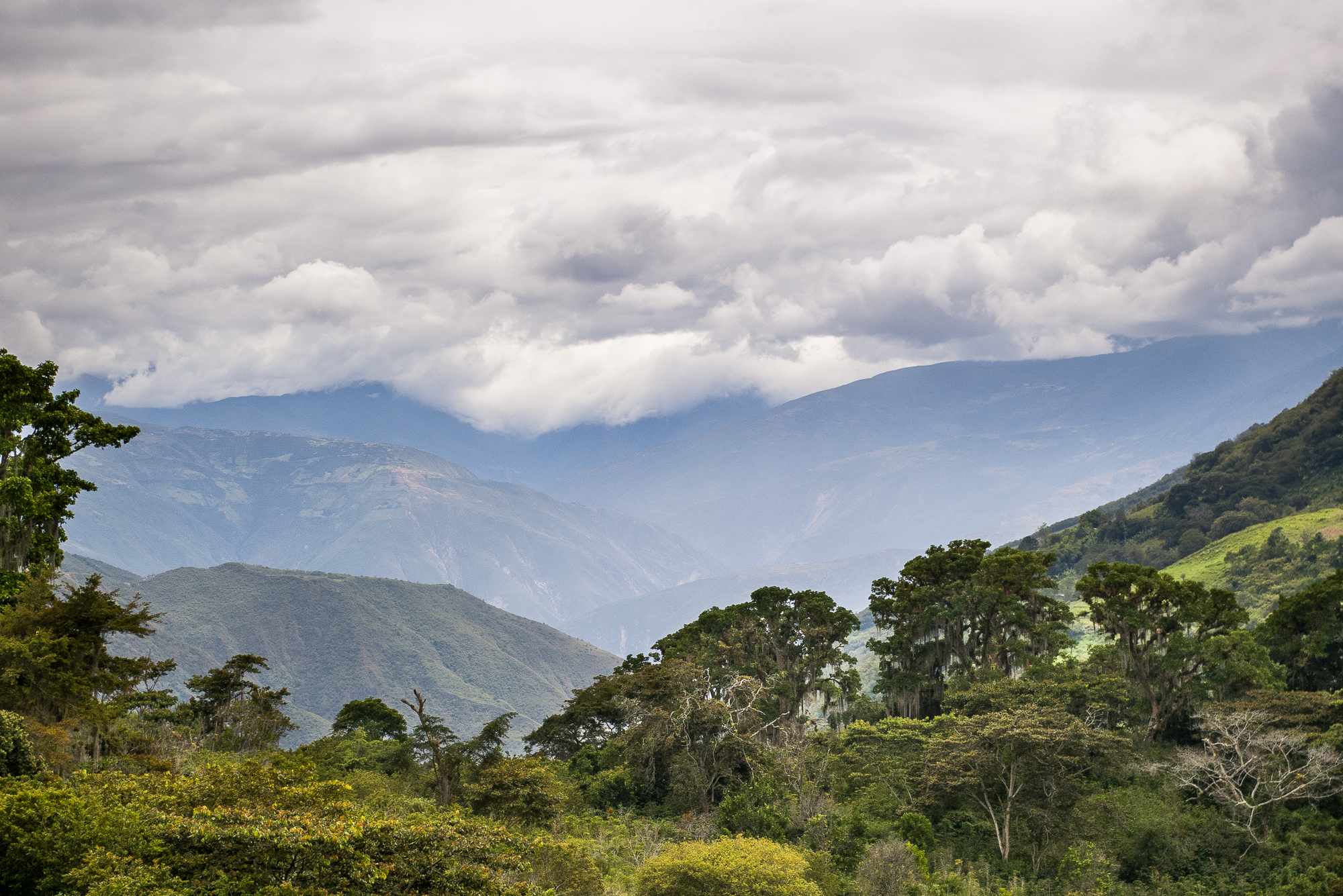
A coffee farm with surrounding mountains in Venezuela

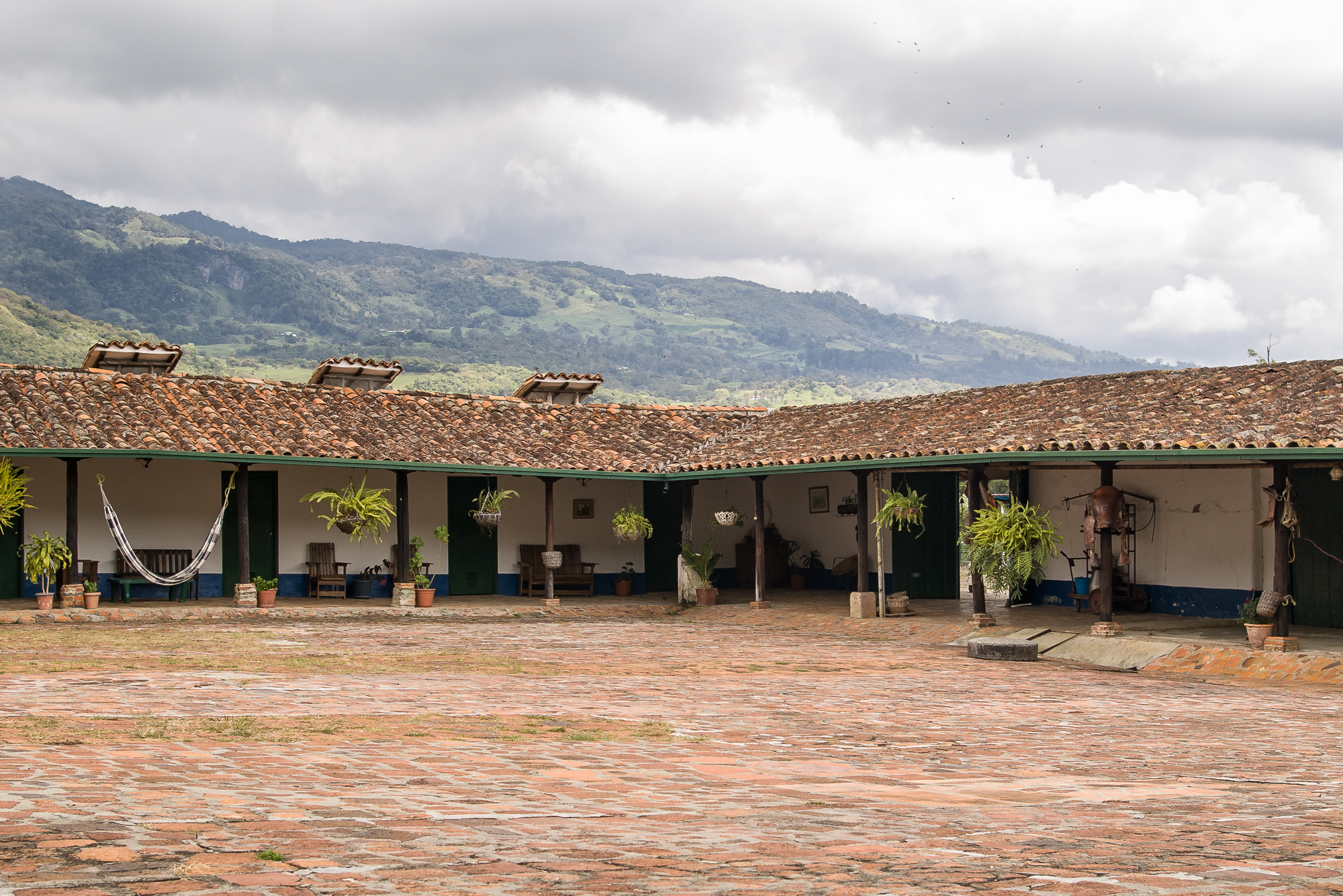
Courtyard of a coffee farm

Coffee production occurs in the Coast Range and the western Andean region with the only requirements being sufficient top soil and moisture. The coffee production system followed in the Andes region, which is the premontane moist forest, is a multilayered system (3 to 4 layered canopies) in which there are multi-species of plants. In this system, trees provide the shade needed for growth of coffee. This region is a part in the three geographical regions of Venezuela namely, the Mountains and Caribbean Coastal region, the Llanos region, and the Orinoco River Delta region, and the Guayana region.

The plantations are generally in the altitudinal range of 1,000–5,000 feet (300–1,520 m), bordering with Colombia. Better grades are noted at elevations of 6,000 feet (1,800 m) or higher but these elevations are characterized by slower growth and lower productivity. The fertile region in the highland areas consisted of Táchira, Mérida, and Trujillo, known as the Andean frontier region, and are suitable for growing coffee which could be exported from the Maracaibo's port. This resulted in increased production of coffee in the 19th century. The Duaca region in particular is different from other coffee growing regions in the country; here the growers were, including the wealthy “haciendas”, till 1916, supported the privatization of land with the objective of forcing higher wages for the labour. It is also the region where, in the 1860s, coffee production boomed as the migrating peasants could resist the hegemony of the large land holders. However, this situation changed between 1908 and 1935 when there were political changes resulting in near total privatization of the land in favour of the haciendas resulting in loss of the “peasantry's power”.

The coffee growing area was also extended to marginal agroclimatic region in the elevation range of under 600 metres (2,000 ft), called the premontane dry forest, though the area produced low yields (less than 300 kg per hectare each year), which was made good by the enterprising small farmers with crop diversification. Statistical survey has indicated that coffee plantations are generally in the elevation range of 800–1,700 metres (2,600–5,600 ft) on the hills of the Andean with slopes of 5 to 60%. The land holders were mostly small farmers who accounted for 87.5% of the total land holdings, with each holding of about 3.5 hectares (8.6 acres) under coffee and with traditional multilayered agroforestry practice.

As a perennial crop, the area covered under coffee was 280,000 hectares (690,000 acres) with the Andes region alone accounting for 125,000 hectares (310,000 acres).

== History ==
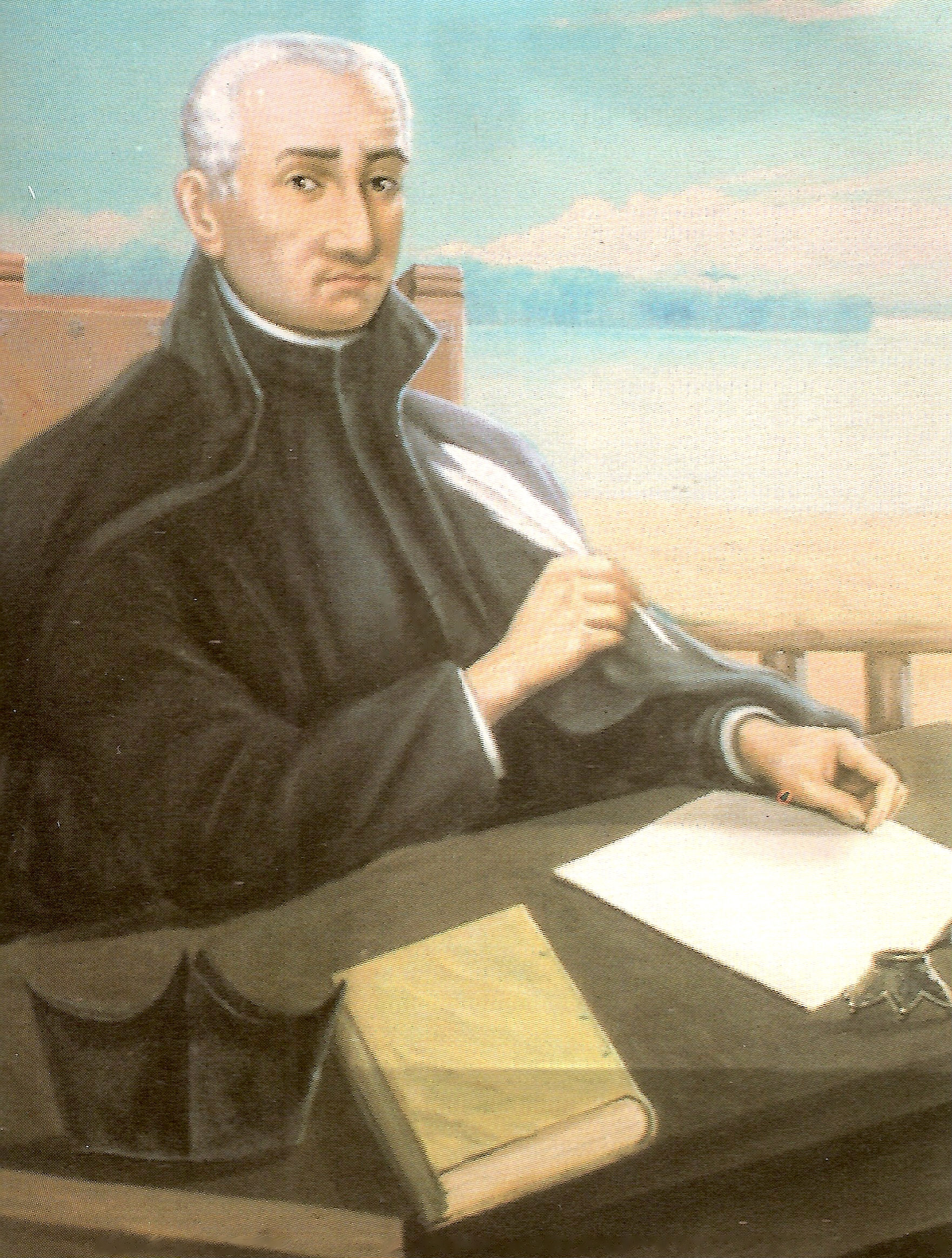
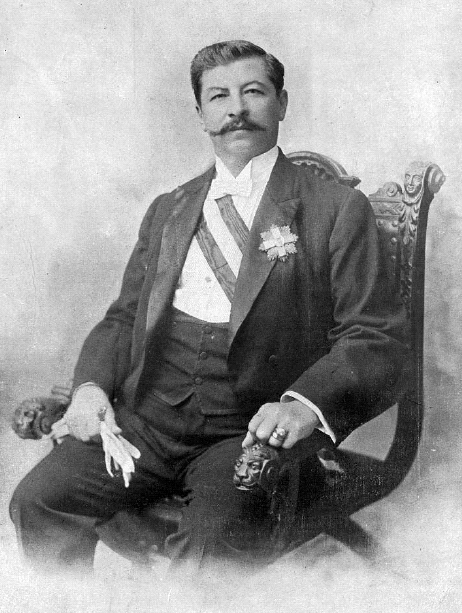
Left: Jesuit priest José Gumilla brought in coffee to Venezuela; right: Juan Vicente Gómez, the tyrant ruler of Venezuela who also used revenue from coffee and petroleum for development of the country.

José Gumilla, a Jesuit priest, is credited with introducing coffee into Venezuela, in 1732. In Venezuela, known as the land of plantations dependent on slave labour, cocoa became the major crop in the 1770s, overshadowing tobacco. From 1793, there were many large coffee plantations in the country. It was only in the 1800s when coffee became the major plantation crop. From 1811 to 1823, cacao production began to drop but coffee production surged. In the 1830s, Venezuela was the third largest coffee exporter in the world. The war of independence in the country also resulted in decline of growth of cacao due to neglect and destruction. However, growth of coffee took a rising trend as its prices in the North Atlantic nations was booming and Venezuela had free trade agreement with these nations. The global crisis of 1857 had caused a 20 to 30% drop in the prices of coffee, cocoa, sugar, and leather exports. During the rule of Antonio Guzmán Blanco as governor of a few states (from 1871) in the late 1880s when he was known by the epithet “Illustrious American”, Venezuela witnessed all round development (development of Caracas is largely attributed to him) and coffee production increased rapidly as there was an additional support in the form of loans from foreign countries.

While Venezuelan politicians sought unsuccessfully to entice European farmers to the coffee frontier, Andean peasants and others from Colombia spontaneously colonized extensive areas of the mid-slopes suitable for coffee production.

Juan Vicente Gómez, who ruled the country with an iron grip for 27 years (from 1908 to 1935), beneficially utilized the revenue generated by coffee and petroleum for development activities of the country. In 1919, coffee and cacao constituted 75 percent of the country's exports, the principal market being the U.S.

In 2003, the Government of Venezuela introduced policy regulations (fixing procurement price limits) on growing coffee which restricted the production of coffee in the country. Consequently, the imports (to the extent of 50% of local production) become imperative to meet the growing domestic demand. Imports are mostly from Brazil and Nicaragua. It is the contention of the coffee growers that it is no more economical to grow coffee under the present regulations though the government attributes this shortage as due to illegal hoarding by the growers for profit. According to a Coffee growers report, the cost of producing one quintal of top quality coffee was US$335 while its sale price is only US$173 (capped by the government). All these changes have resulted in Venezuela losing its position as one of the world's largest coffee exporters. The future of these changes is unknown in the wake of the death of President of Venezuela, Hugo Chávez, who introduced the policy changes in 2003.

== Types ==
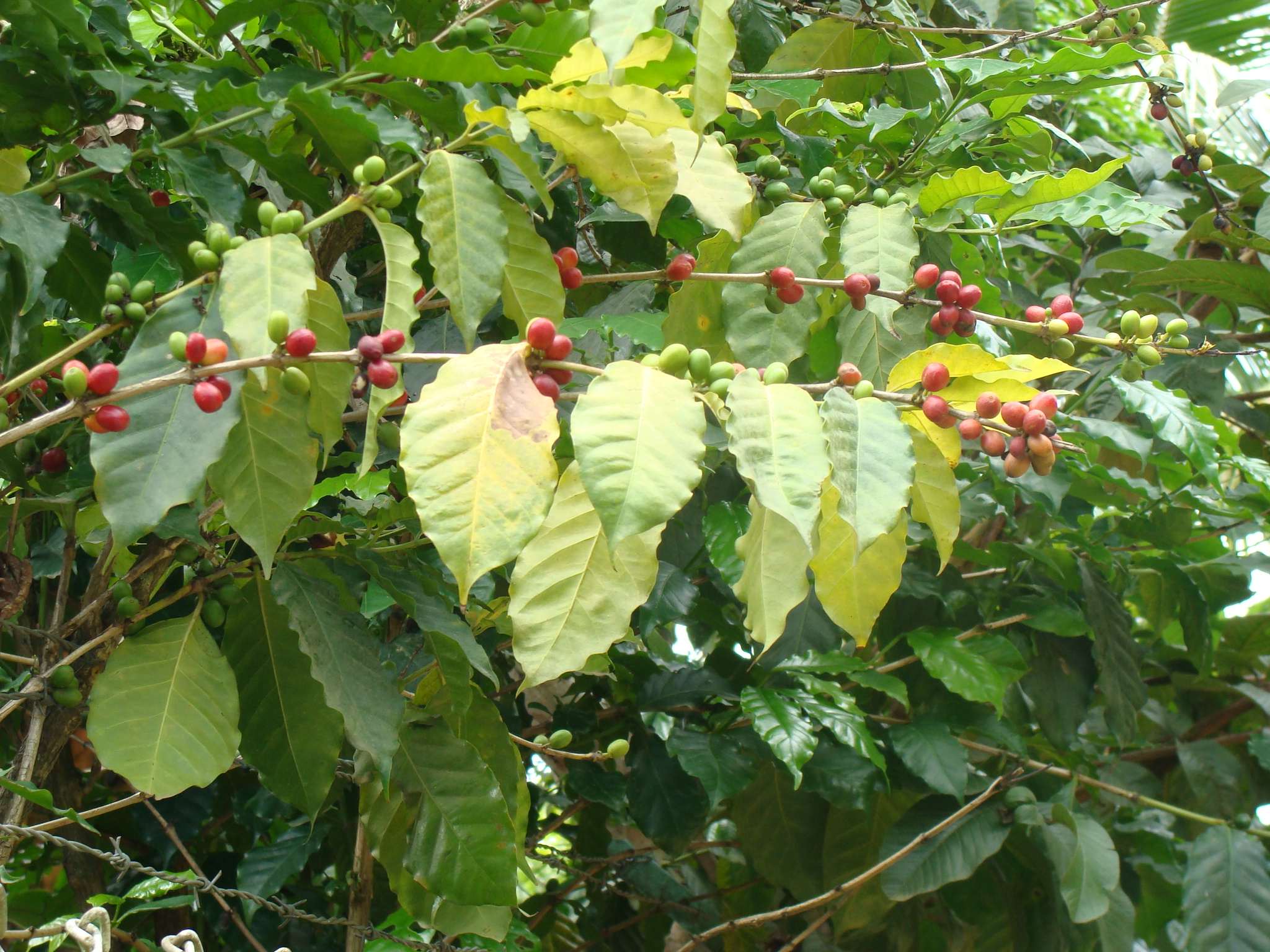
Coffee tree in Serranía del Interior, near San Juan de los Morros, Venezuela

The “Maracaibos” coffee exported from the Maracaibo port has sub varieties called Cucuta, Mérida, Trujillo, and Tachira. The eastern mountains coffee is known as “Caracas”, named after the capital city. While these are the local varieties of coffee grown in Venezuela, the basic universal coffee varieties under which the Venezuelan one fall under are the arabica (Coffea arabica L.) which grows better in the high land regions, and the Robusta (Coffea canephora p. ex Fr.) which grows in the low land regions; the former variety grows under forest canopy while the latter grows under partial shade.

== Quality ==
"Lavado Fino", meaning "fine washed", is the country's highest grade of coffee. The best quality of Venezuelan coffee is reportedly from the western region which borders Colombia. The coffee is shipped from Maracaibo and the coffee is also named as "Maracaibos"; the coffee grown is characterized as “bright flavours with a clean, crisp finish.” It is also light weight and of simple structure but less acidic as compared with other Latin American coffee.

Coffees from the coastal mountains farther east are generally marked "Caracas”, after the capital city, and are shipped through La Guaira, the port of Caracas. Caripe comes from a mountain range close to the Caribbean and typically displays the soft, gentle profile of the island coffees of the Caribbean.

== Production ==
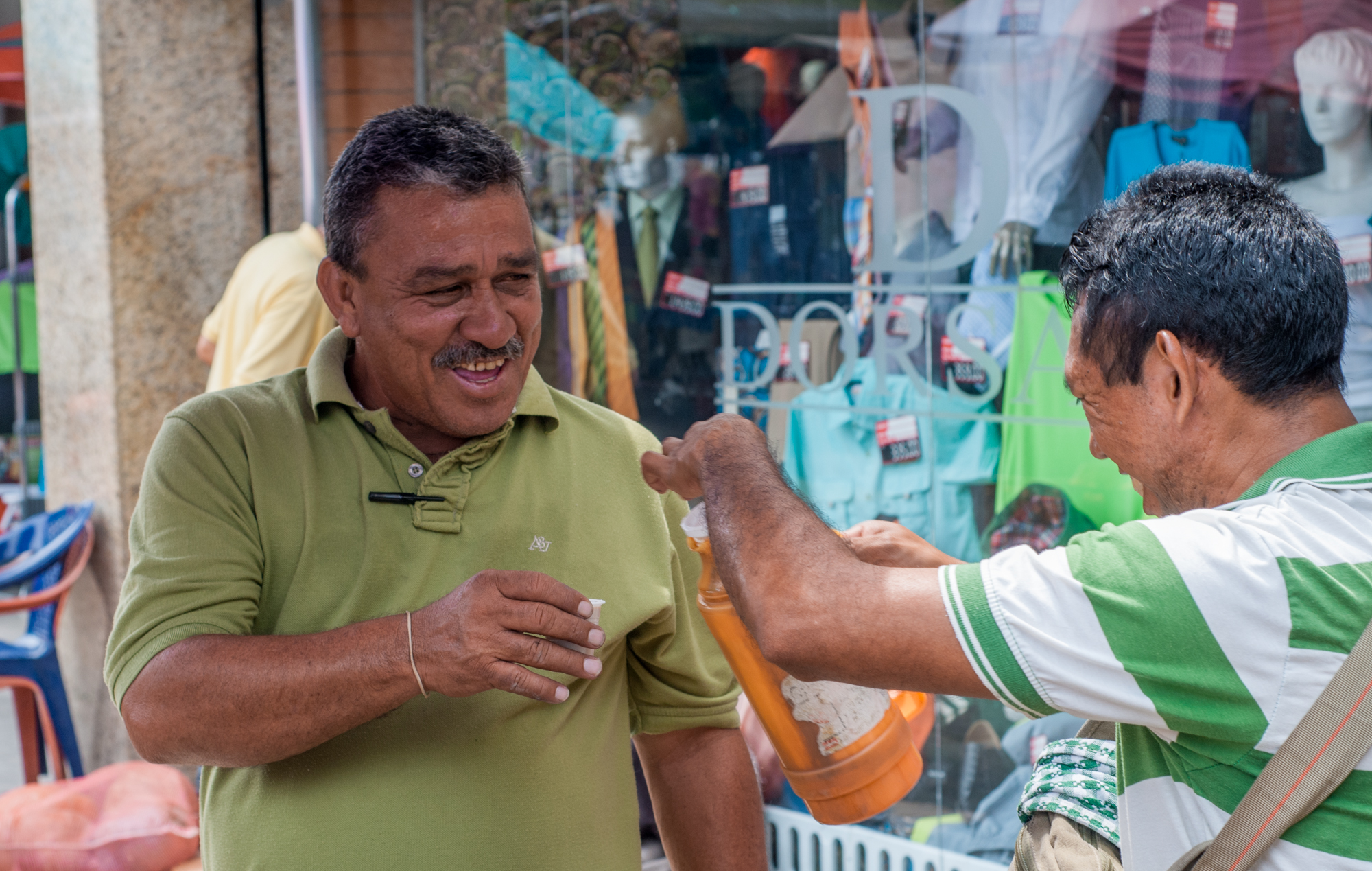
Maracaibo merchants drinking coffee

Coffee cultivation was introduced to the region Tachira in the 18th century by Gervasio Rubio. The production of the ruble developed rapidly and soon began to have a very important weight in the world context after the destruction of the plantations of this bush in Saint Domingue, originated by the slaves revolts that affected the Island in 1791. Thus, since 1860, the Andean states the coffee producer grew substantially in the midst of a process characterized by increasing consumption and decreased world production. The consequent growth of the production generated by the coffee plantations of Táchira state, drove the regional economy abroad. Therefore, it was necessary, then, to place the product in Maracaibo, to be taken from there to the international markets of European countries and the United States. Thus, from having been an isolated and economically self-sufficient or independent region, Táchira became a prosperous region with important national and international relations. The development of the coffee economy in Tachira would be affected by the ups and downs of the world market, which translates into a succession of periods of prosperity or depression, according to the price of the product on an international scale. These periods would depend on the competitiveness of other countries such as Brazil, which fully satisfied the North American demand, as well as the production costs of the grain and the producer. By 1870, a very important coffee boom for the Tachira economy took place. The region experienced unusual prosperity:

Coffee trees can be harvested within four years after planting. Each tree lives for about 50 years. While two pickings occur annually (October and November; December, January, and part of February) the latter one provides the larger harvest of the two. However, the picking season does vary by elevation and local conditions such that trees at elevations greater than 3,000 feet (910 m) are harvested later than those in lower elevations. Coffee production peaked to 1 million bags per year before 1914, and after local consumption much of its exports were second only to Brazil. In the Andean frontier region coffee production had increased ten times (between 1830 and 1930) making it the second largest coffee producing nation in the world. The major traders were Germans as Breuer Möller & Cía, Blohm & Cía, Steinvorth & Cía, Van Diessel Rode & Cía., Beckmann & Cia., Christern Zinng & Cía., Rayhrer & Firnhaber, Italians as Dall’Orso & Cia, Riboli & Abbo Cía., Fossi F. & Cía., A. Manzini & Cía., Lovisi & Caruso Cía., Bozo & Cia., Bisagno Oliva & Cia., Patrizzi and Son, Dutchs as J.& H. D.C. Gómes, Jacobo López H., D.A., Capriles y Chumaceiro, De Lima y Jacob M. Henríquez, American as Bramon Estates Company and Venezuelans as H.L. Boulton Jr. & Cía., Blohm & Cía, Burguera & Cía., París Hermanos, Tito Abbo & Cía., Senior Hermanos, Marturet Scholtz & Cía., Julio A. Añez & Cía. and others. More than 82,000 tonnes of coffee were produced in 1919; when the Italians traders grew in importance. In 1918, they controlled 46.08% of the world coffee trade from Maracaibo, with 6,488,280 kilograms exported by Oliva Rivoli & Cia.; 4,160,640 kilograms by Fossi & Co. and 240,000 kilograms by Patrizzi and Son(Ardao, 1984:278). In spite of temporary dips, at the end of the agricultural and cattle breeding in Venezuela Italian firms covered approximately 24% of coffee exports. Riboli, Abbo & Co. reached an outstanding development by 1926, when international coffee prices rose. It was at the top of the Maracaibo coffee export business, displacing even the most important German firms from 1932 to 1935, when it exported 9,718,512 kilograms. However, poor agricultural practices, soil erosion, less incidence of rainfall and over use of soil strength caused a drastic decline in the yield, in the 1920s, which resulted in the decline of the coffee industry in the country; petroleum extraction compounded its downfall.

Typically, coffee production is at its greatest during the months December and January, and shipping of Venezuelan coffee takes place between October and May. Coffee grown in Venezuela is largely consumed by locals and the rest is sold mainly to the United States, Belgium and Germany.

Today Venezuela produces less than one percent of the world's coffee, and most of it is drunk by the Venezuelans themselves. However, some interesting Venezuela coffees are again entering the North American specialty market. The best-known Maracaibo coffees, in addition to Cúcuta, are Mérida, Trujillo, and Táchira. Mérida typically displays fair to good body and an unemphatic but sweetly pleasant flavor with hints of richness. Táchira and Cúcuta resemble Colombias, with rich acidity, medium body, and occasional fruitiness.

== See also ==
- List of countries by coffee production

== Bibliography ==
- Francis, J. Michael (2006). Iberia and the Americas: Culture, Politics, and History : a Multidisciplinary Encyclopedia. ABC-CLIO. pp. 249–. ISBN 978-1-85109-421-9.
- Yarrington, Douglas (15 December 1997). A Coffee Frontier: Land, Society, and Politics in Duaca, Venezuela, 1830–1936. University of Pittsburgh Pre. pp. 11–. ISBN 978-0-8229-7494-9.
- Krech III, Shepard; Merchant, Carolyn; McNeill, John Robert, eds. (2004). Encyclopedia of World Environmental History. Vol. 3: O-Z, Index. Routledge. pp. 1279–. ISBN 978-0-415-93735-1.
- Tarver Denova, Hollis Micheal (2005). The history of Venezuela. Greenwood Publishing Group. pp. 82–. ISBN 978-0-313-33525-9.
