= El Orinoco ilustrado y defendido =

1745 book

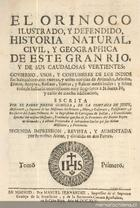
El Orinoco ilustrado y defendido

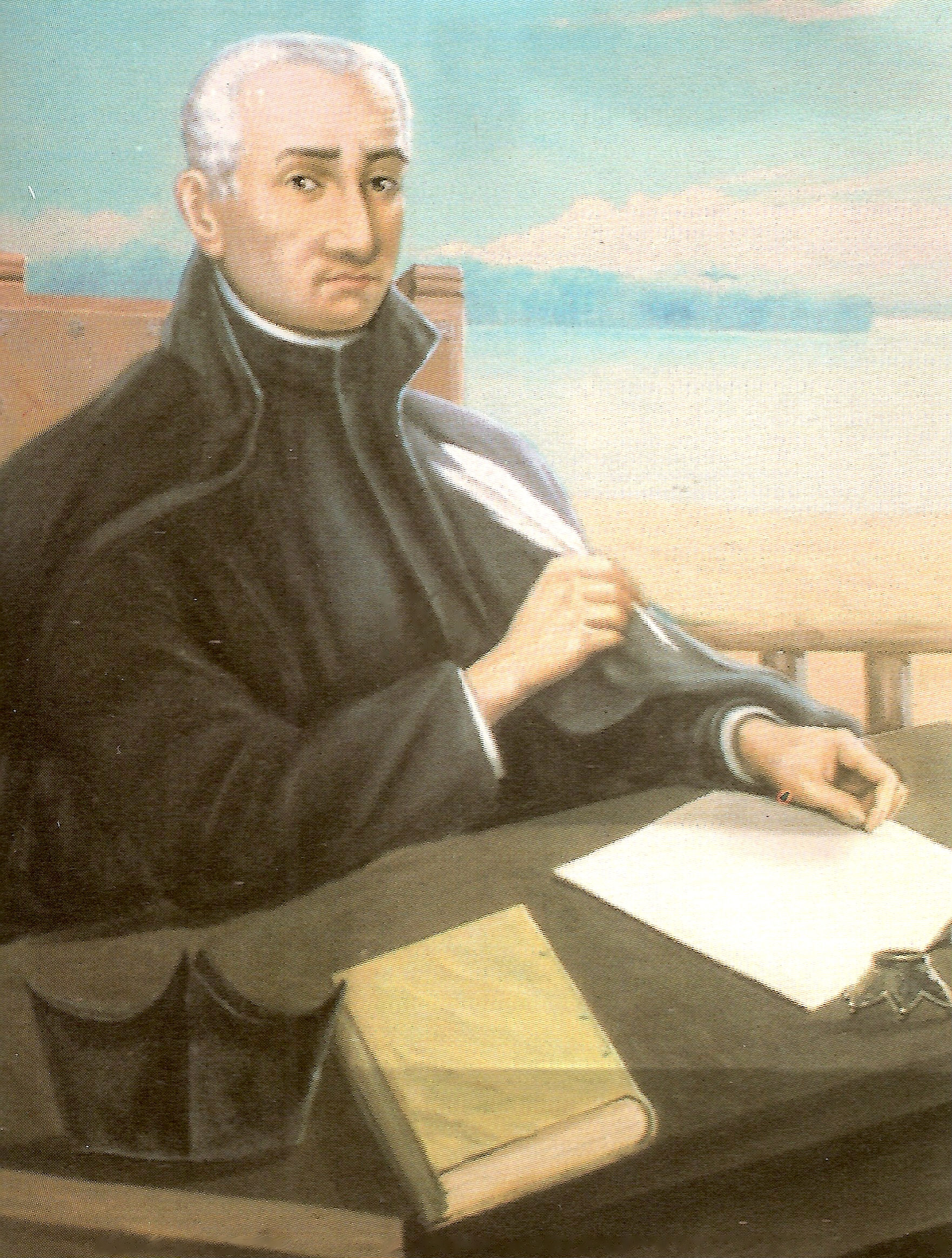
Joseph Gumilla

El Orinoco ilustrado y defendido (The Orinoco illustrated and defended) is a book written by the Jesuit missionary Joseph Gumilla. He explored the Orinoco River basin in the eighteenth century. The book provides details on the tributaries of the Orinoco River from Venezuela, as well as customs of the indigenous people, medicines, food, etc.
