= Isabel (Waikeri leader) =

Waikeri leader

- Dona

Leader of the Waikeri
- Reign: ~1520s-1558
- Predecessor: Paraguarime
- Successor: Elder council
- Born: ~1496-1514
- Died: 1558; El Panecillo, Venezuela Province
- Cause of death: Poisoning; Warfare
- Spouse: Francisco Fajardo the Elder (1527–1530); Alonso Carreño (1530–1548)
- Issue: Francisco Fajardo the Younger; Alonso Carreño (d. 1548); Juan Carreño (d. 1548)
- Father: Charamaya
- Religion: Waikeri religion; Catholicism
- Occupation: Diplomat; Ambassador; Political leader

Isabel (fl. 1500s) was a Waikeri leader. During her reign, she allied the Waikeri with the Spanish Empire to protect the Waikeri people from enslavement, forced taxation and subjugation under the encomienda system. She collaborated with the Spanish Empire in their imperialism and colonialism on the mainland with her mestizo son becoming a conquistador.

== Biography ==
She was likely born in the town called Palguarime near modern-day Porlamar between 1496 and 1514. She was the child of many former leaders including her grandfathers Charaima and Paraguarime and her father Charamaya. Charamaya and Charaima were leaders among the nearby Caraca people living near modern-day Caracas. Among the Waikeri, property and titles are inherited matrilineally and thus she inherited her office through her mother.

When the Waikeri made contact with Spanish colonizers, they allied with them. This is when Isabel, whose Waikeri name is unknown, adopted the Spanish name Isabel after her baptism. It was taken in honor of Isabel de Manrique de Villalobos (mother of the future governor of the Province of Margarita, Aldonza Villalobos Manrique) and Isabella I of Castile. In 1525, King Charles I recognized the Waikeri as free vassals of the crown. While cooperating with the Spanish, she also worked to preserve the traditions and lands of her people. She received the title "Dona" from the Crown of Castile.

In 1526–1527, the lieutenant governor of the province of Margarita, Pedro de Villardiga, accused the Waikeri of being in rebellion. The lieutenant governor threatened them by referring to them as Caribs who ought to be enslaved. Isabel intervened and empowered the Waikeri to reap the benefits of Spanish colonization and participate in the colonial pearl trade. Pedro de Villardiga was deposed in favor of Francisco Fajardo the Elder. Isabel married Fajardo and they had a mestizo child in 1528 also named Francisco Fajardo, who would become a famous conquistador. To solidify their alliance, Isabel sent her army to Cubagua the same year to attack pirate Diego Ingenios in what may have been the first recorded naval battle in South America.

Francisco Fajardo proved to be an ineffective governor and was removed from his post by the Crown. To save his skin, he fled to Europe, abandoning his wife and child to avoid persecution. Isabel then married Alonso Carreño and had two sons named Alonso Carreño and Juan Carreño. Alonso and Juan would go on to support Francisco Fajardo the younger in his colonial campaigns. In the 1530s and 1540s, the Spanish would continually attempt to force the Waikeri into Encommiendas and enslavement, which was subverted by Isabel. Her alliance with the Spanish continued and her army continually attacked pirates and local Carib tribes on behalf of the Spanish colonizers. Due to this, King Charles I continued recognizing the Waikeri as free vassals.

In 1555, Isabel put her now adult son Francisco Fajardo in charge of an army for a campaign in modern-day central Venezuela. In 1557, Isabel herself led a campaign in the region. She worked as the expedition's ambassador to the various foreign countries on the mainland, often using her extensive familial connections with prominent figures. This included her uncle Naiguatá, a leader of the Caraca people. Isabel's efforts ensured her son's army was well received in the countries visited on the campaign. However, the Spanish conquistadors in the army committed various abuses against the locals, which led to many people turning hostile. In 1558, while on campaign, Isabel got sick after drinking poisoned well water and died at a town called El Panecillo, close to modern day Chuspa. The well was poisoned by a Caraca leader, Paisana, who was later killed in vengeance by Isabel's son Francisco Fajardo.

== Legacy ==
Historically, Isabel was described positively by some Spanish settlers. In 1589, chronicler Juan de Castellanos wrote about her in his epic poem named Elegía de Varones Ilustres de Indias. The poem describes Isabel, stating, "Doña Isabel la India se decía señora principal, mujer bastante, a quien grande respeto se tenía toda la tierra firme circunstante."

In modern times, Isabel is a controversial figure, with many authors and politicians viewing her negatively due to her collaboration with Spanish settlers. Some go so far as to view Isabel as treacherous and Malinchist.

In 1979, Conferry, a Venezuelan shipping company, bought a Norwegian ship and named it after Isabel. The Cacica Isabel was in continuous use until 2016.

== See also ==
- Ana Soto
- Ann Gollifer
- Apacuana
- Carib Queen
- Gladys Guaipo
