= Joseph Gumilla =

Spanish Jesuit naturalist

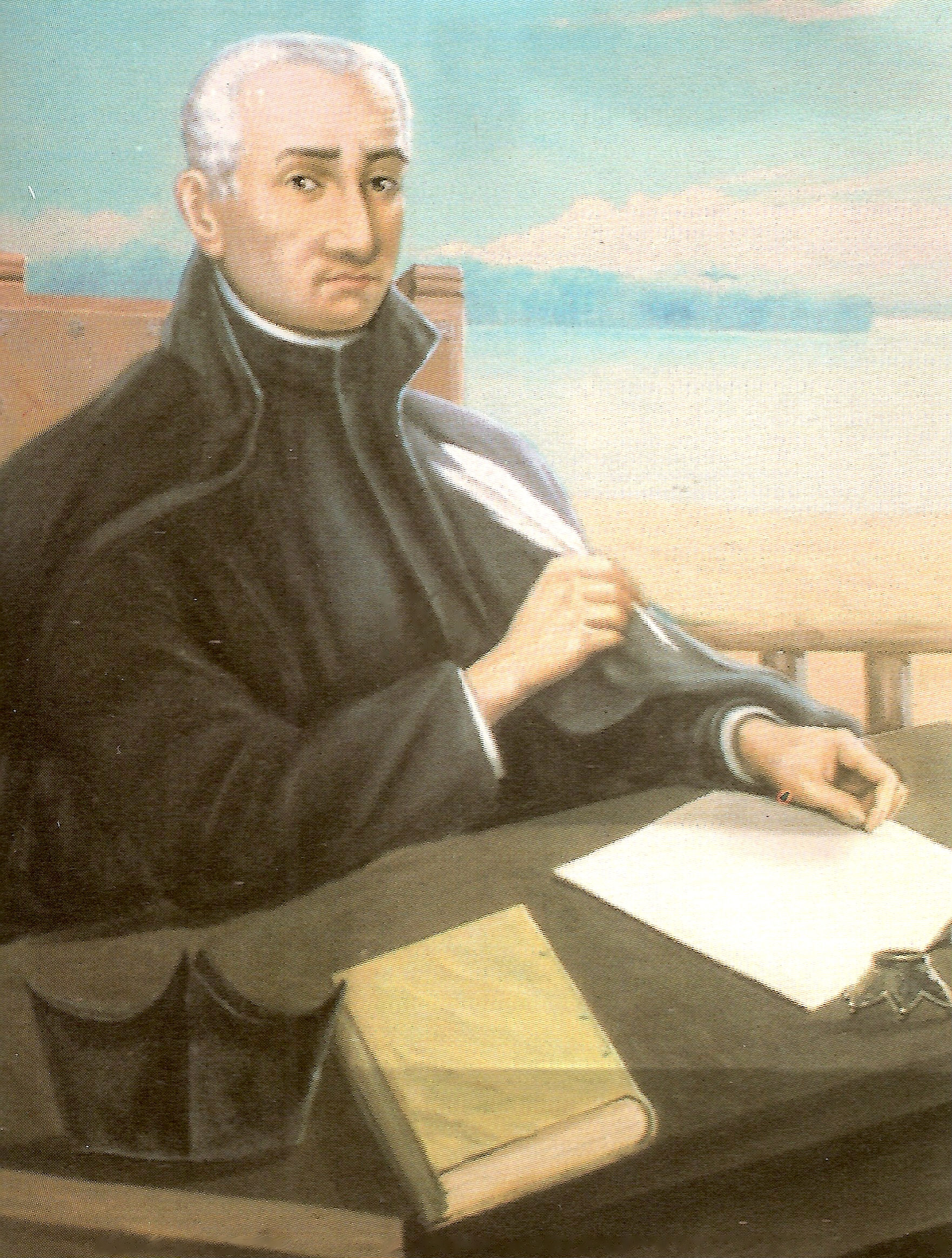
José Gumilla

Joseph Gumilla (1686, in Cárcer – 1750, in the Llanos) was a Jesuit priest who wrote a natural history of the Orinoco River region.

== Biography ==
In 1705 he left Spain for New Granada (today Colombia) where he studied at the Universidad Javeriana in Bogotá. He was ordained in 1714 and went to the Orinoco Mission. In 1701 he went to Venezuela and worked there for 35 years. He was sometime Rector of the School of Cartagena, Provincial Superior of New Granada, and Procurator in Rome from 1738. Here he wrote El Orinoco Ilustrado (Madrid, 1741). He returned to South America in 1743 with Filippo Salvatore Gilii. Gumilla introduced coffee into Venezuela in 1732. The beans were exported to Brazil.

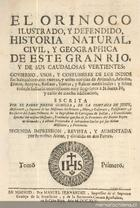
El Orinoco ilustrado y defendido
