= Hebron University Museum of Antiquities =

Art and history museum in Hebron, West Bank, Palestine

Hebron University Museum
- متحف جامعة الخليل
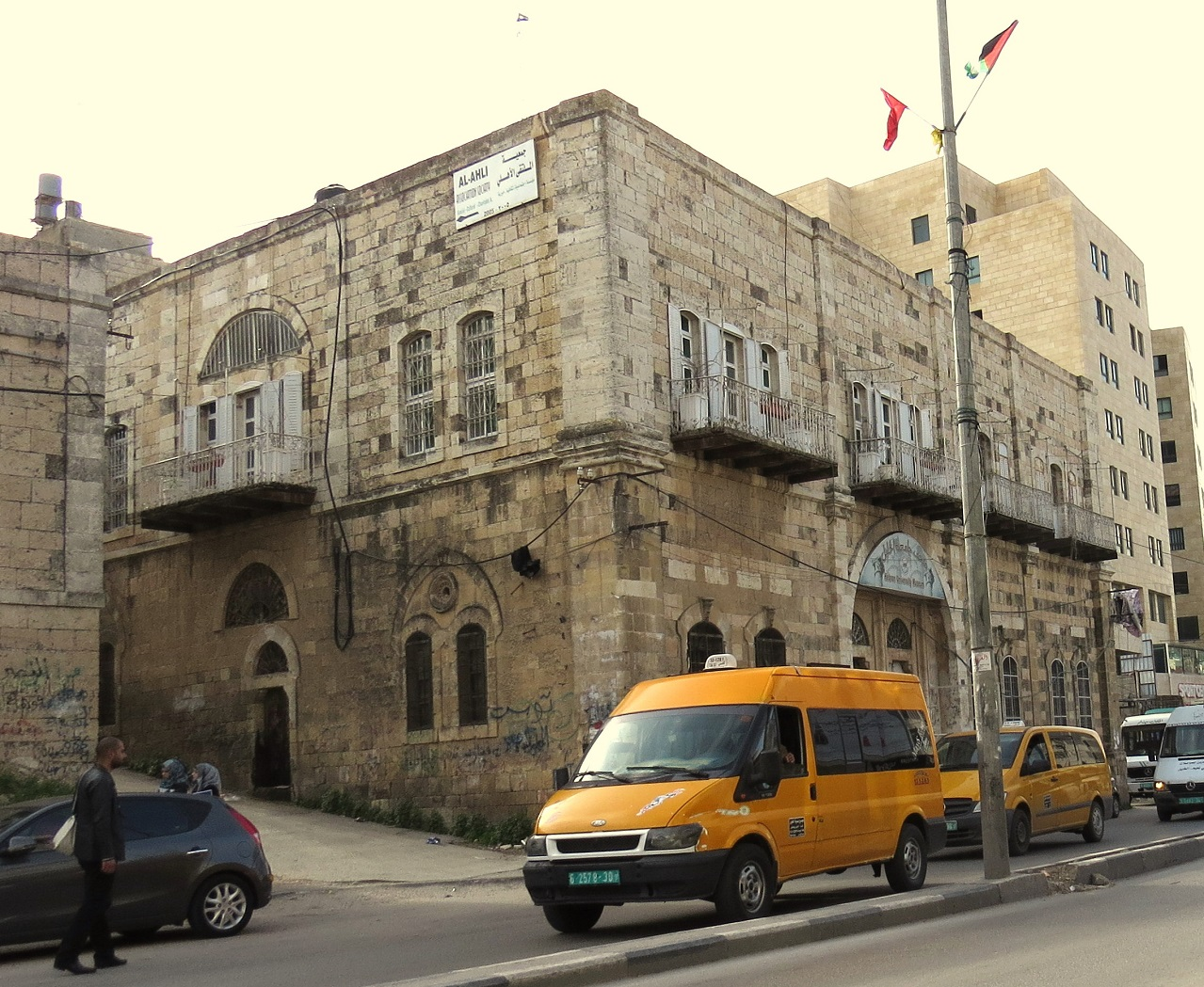
- Established: 2010
- Location: Hebron, West Bank, Palestine
- Coordinates: 31.5326°N 35.0981°E
- Type: Art and history museum

The Hebron University Museum of Antiquities is an academic and heritage museum located on the campus of Hebron University in the city of Hebron, in the West Bank, Palestine.

== Description ==
The museum was established in 2010. It houses archaeological artifacts dating back to the Bronze Age, as well as ceramic coffins from the Roman period in Palestine.

== Gallery ==
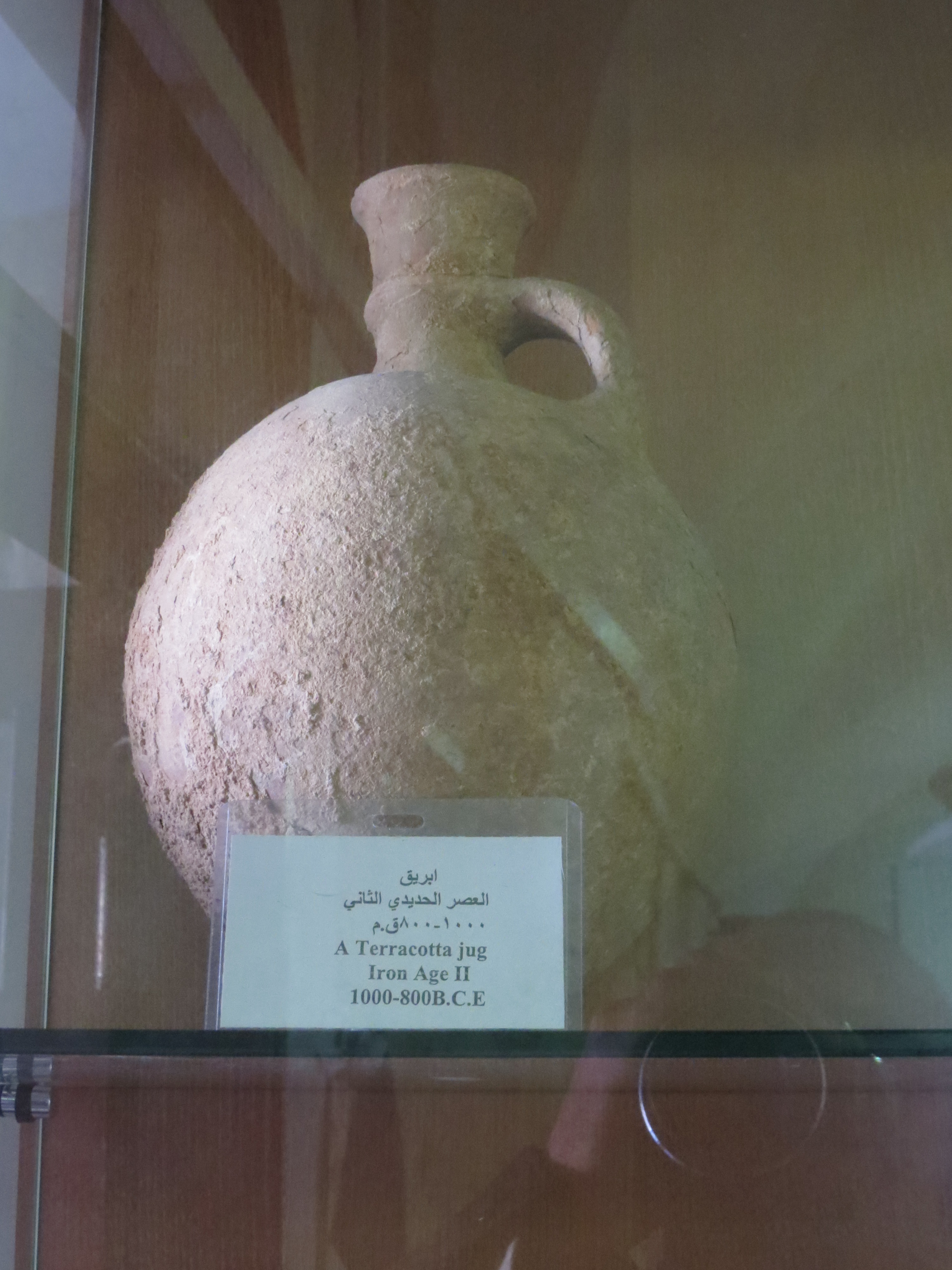
Archaeological jug from the Iron Age II

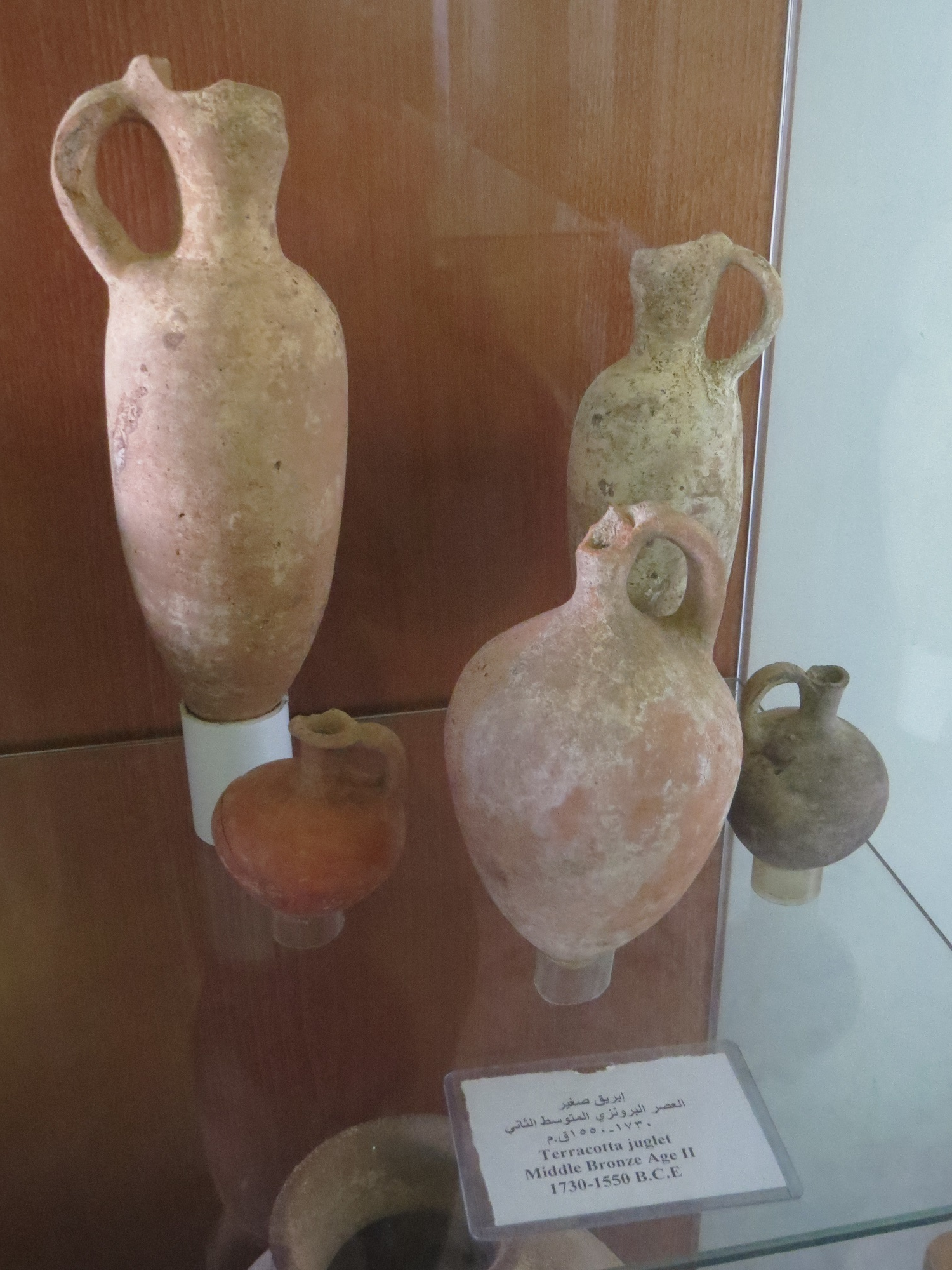
Small jug from the Middle Bronze Age II

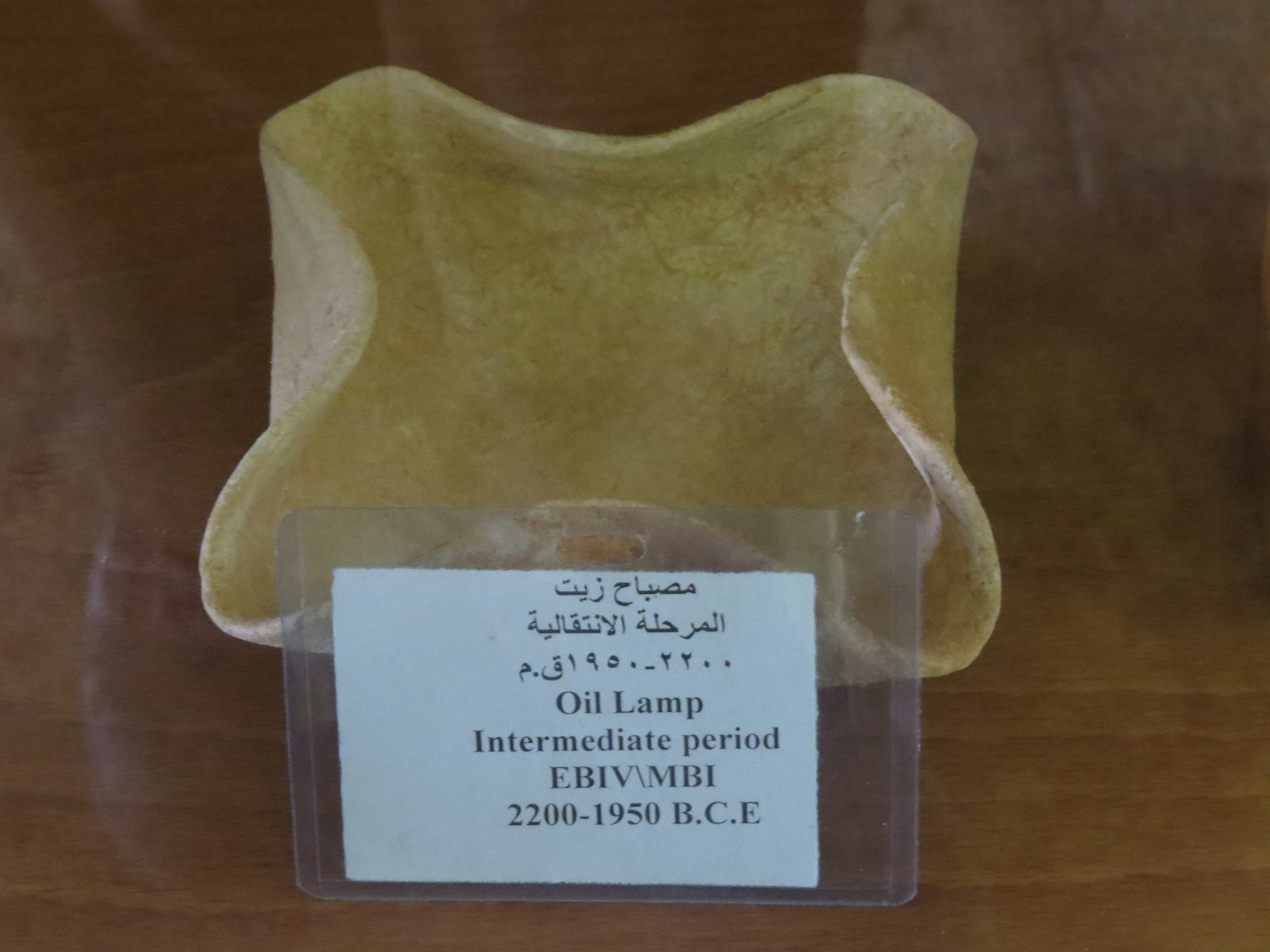
Oil lamp

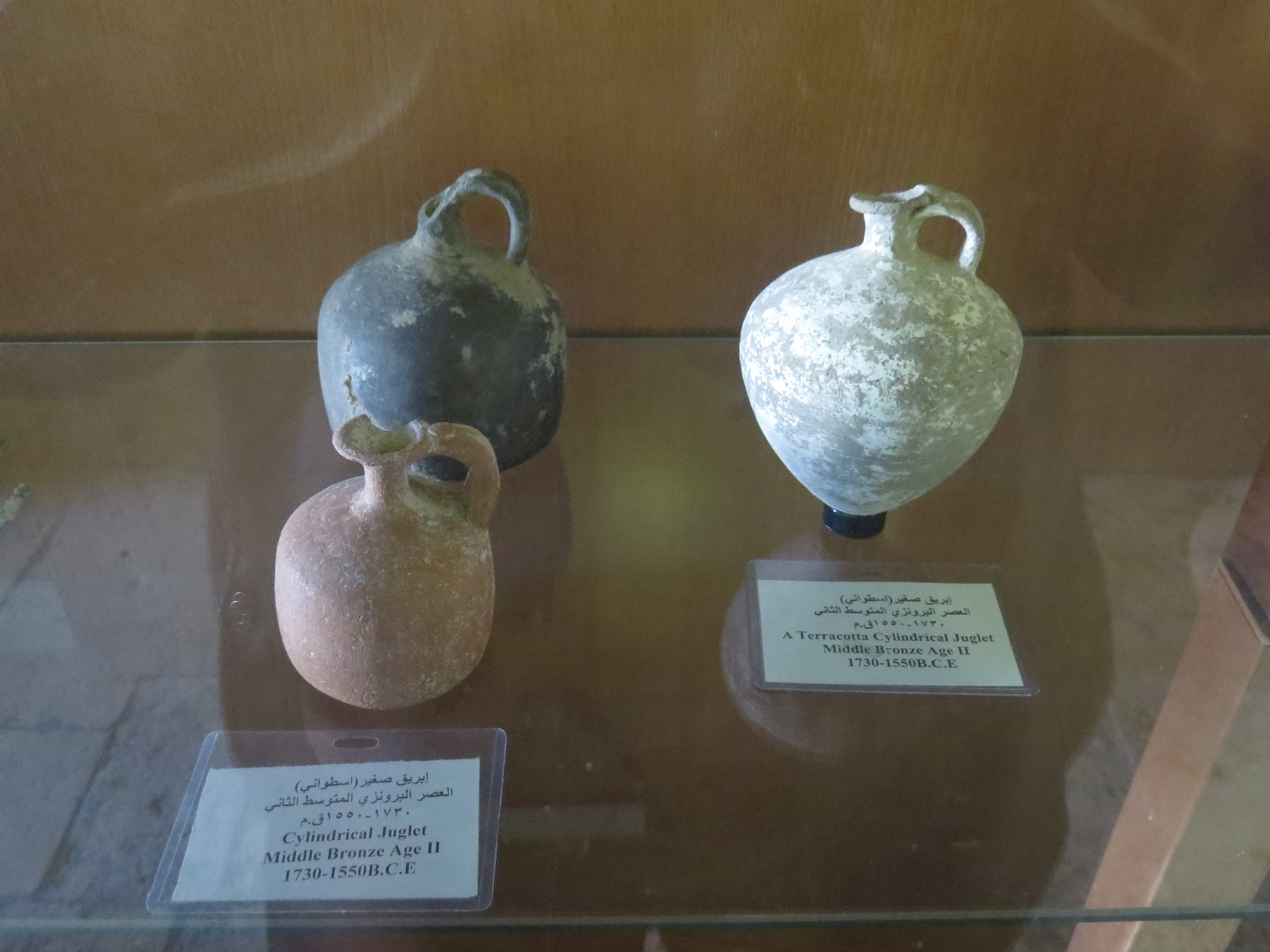
Small cylindrical jug from the Middle Bronze Age II

== See also ==
- List of museums in Palestine
- Al-Badd Museum for Olive Oil Production
- Hebron Governorate
- Tulkarm Museum
- Dura Museum
- Hisham's Palace Museum
- Hebron University
