= 1983 Hebron University attack =

Zionist terrorist attack

- Location: Hebron University, West Bank, Palestine
- Date: 26 July 1983
- Attack type: Zionist terrorism, school shooting, mass murder, revenge killing
- Deaths: 3
- Injuries: 30+
- Perpetrator: Jewish Underground
- Motive: Revenge for murder of Israeli student
- Charges: Murder
- Convictions: Life imprisonment, later reduced to 10 years
- Convicted: 3

The 1983 Hebron University attack was a mass shooting carried out by a right-wing terrorist organization known as the Jewish Underground at Hebron University, Palestine, on 26 July 1983 following the murder of a yeshiva student by Palestinian attackers. Three Palestinian students were killed and over thirty wounded. Three members of the Jewish Underground were convicted of murder and sentenced to life imprisonment for the attack, but later had their sentences reduced multiple times, eventually to 10 years, by President Chaim Herzog.

== Background ==
The Palestinian West Bank has been occupied by Israel since the Six-Day War in 1967. During the occupation, a number of Israelis have constructed illegal settlements in the West Bank. The West Bank city of Hebron has been a particular flashpoint of conflict.

On 7 July 1983, Aharon Gross, an 18-year-old yeshiva student, was stabbed and murdered by three Palestinians in a marketplace in Hebron. In response to the attack, Israeli general Ori Orr ordered Mayor of Hebron Mustafa Natshe as well as the elected Hebron city council removed from their positions, accusing them of encouraging a "series of hostile terrorist acts and breaches of public order," and replacing them with an Israeli-appointed official. In the following days, a group of Israeli settlers burnt down the marketplace in retaliation.

== Events ==
=== Shooting ===
Around midday on 26 July 1983, at least two people jumped out of a car and entered Hebron University, wearing keffiyehs and carrying Kalashnikov rifles. They threw a grenade into the university building and opened fire indiscriminately on students gathered in the university's courtyard for lunch, before fleeing. Three of the students were killed and over thirty injured. The three killed were identified as Saad Adin Hassan Sabri, Jamal Saad El Adin Nayal, and Samir Fatih Daoud. The injured were treated at Princess Alia Governmental Hospital, Hebron.

=== Investigation ===
Immediately after the attack, Israeli officials pledged to open a full-scale investigation. Israeli general Ori Orr, however, stated that "We don’t know who we are looking for," and stated that the military did not see an immediate link between the attack and the murder of Aharon Gross, despite claims by some Palestinians that the attack came in retaliation.

Israeli officials initially stated that the attack might have been a result of Palestinian internal political violence, particularly fighting between the Palestine Liberation Organization and Islamist groups. In October 1983, Israeli Minister of Defence Moshe Arens stated that the existence of a Jewish terrorist group could not be discounted and that "not having found the criminals as yet, I'm not ready to tell you that they're Arabs and that it couldn't possibly be that they're Jews." The previous month, his brother, University of Bridgeport international law professor Richard Arens accused him of failing to investigate the attack.

=== Trial ===
In June 1984, the trial of the Jewish Underground members began. In July 1985, three were convicted for the attack on Hebron University, Menachem Livni, Uzi Sharbaf, and Shaul Nir. All three were sentenced to life imprisonment. When speaking to journalists after being sentenced, Livni claimed that "An injustice was done," asking "How can a government abandon citizens and their lives while giving criminal punishment to the defendants?" Nir stated that "There is only one master of the universe and he'll know how to take care of things."

Sharbaf was the son-in-law of the Gush Emunim settler movement figure Moshe Levinger.

== Reactions ==
=== In Palestine ===
A number of protests and strikes broke out across the West Bank in response to the shooting. The afternoon of the day of the attack, one Palestinian was killed and one injured when Israeli forces attempted to disperse a demonstration. On 27 July, at least four Birzeit University students were injured as a demonstration clashed with Israeli military forces. In response to the protests, the Israeli military imposed a curfew on Hebron and deployed several thousand soldiers to the area. Ousted Mayor of Hebron Mustafa Natshe responded to the curfew by claiming that "If the victim is Israeli, a curfew is imposed on the Arabs. If the victim is Arab, a curfew is also imposed on the Arabs," and that "the settlers can do anything and not be afraid of punishment."

On 1 August, the Israeli military lifted the curfew on Hebron. The same day, Israeli military courts began court proceedings against 26 Birzeit University students who had been arrested during the protests. The day after, two of the students were sentenced to nine months incarceration each for their participation in the protests.

=== In Israel ===
Prime Minister of Israel Menachem Begin described the attack as a "despicable act," while Deputy Minister of Foreign Affairs Yehuda Ben-Meir described it as an "outrage and atrocity which was perpetrated by evil people."

The Jewish Underground trial was controversial in Israel, with Israeli nationalists praising the defendants as heroes. Minister of Foreign Affairs Yitzhak Shamir stated that he wished to see them pardoned, while Likud chair Haim Kaufman stated that he would present a bill to the Knesset to have them released.

Former Shin Bet director Avraham Ahituv published an article in Davar in response the attack calling Israeli settlements a "psychological hothouse for the growth of Jewish terror" and stated that violent settlers felt like they had the government's support. In responses, the Gush Emunim movement called the article "a danger to the nation’s security." Israeli Chief of the General Staff Moshe Levi rejected calls for settlers to be disarmed, stating that settlers needed weapons for self-defence.

A number of Arab localities in Israel held a two-hour strike in protest against the shootings on 29 July.

=== International ===
Spokesperson for the United States Department of State John Hughes stated that the US "deplores this criminal act and condemns terrorism from any corner" and urged "all in the area to be calm and refrain from further acts of violence." Permanent Representative of Greece to the United Nations Michalis Doundas described the attack as a "cowardly act of violence" and called for the Israeli government to "ensure that such criminal acts against the local Arab population are not repeated in the future."

In response to the attack, the United Nations Security Council held a debate on the situation in the West Bank. A motion calling for countries "not to provide Israel with any assistance to be used specifically in connection with settlements in the occupied territories" failed to pass the Security Council, with 13 members voting in favour, Zaire abstaining, and the United States using its veto power. The American representative on the Security Council, Charles Lichenstein, stated that the debate over the legality of Israeli settlements was "sterile" and that it was not "practical or even appropriate to call for the dismantling of the existing settlements." Permanent Representative of Israel to the United Nations Yehuda Zvi Blum argued that Israel "cannot get a fair deal in the Security Council," and that "Jews have a right to live in Judaea and Samaria. We do not regard ourselves as strangers in any part of the Land of Israel."

== Aftermath ==
In March 1987, President of Israel Chaim Herzog commuted the sentences of the three convicted for the attack to 24 years imprisonment. In May 1988, as part of the 40th anniversary of Israeli independence celebrations, Herzog signed an executive order further reducing the sentences to 15 years. Israeli Minister of Justice Avraham Sharir had recommended full pardons. In June 1989, Herzog reduced the sentences once more to 10 years. In December 1990, all three were released from prison. After being released, Menachem Livni claimed that he was "an innocent citizen who has fulfilled his obligations under extreme circumstances and worst of all was arrested and made a victim in prison."

Following his release, Livni became a cherry and grape farmer on an illegally-owned plot of land in Kiryat Arba in the West Bank. Between 2010 and 2012, he served as chair of the Association for the Renewal of the Jewish Community in Hebron. In 2013, he was awarded 1,327,123 Israeli new shekels by the Israeli justice system for damages caused by Palestinian vandalism of the land.

Uzi Sharbaf has also continued pro-settlement activism. In 2012, he gave a speech at a conference advocating for Israeli annexation of the West Bank attended by several MKs, stating that "This is not Arab land. This is the holy land of God." In 2024, he spoke at an Israeli conference titled "Conference For the Victory of Israel – Settlement Brings Security" advocating Israeli settlement in the Gaza Strip attended by Israeli government ministers.

In December 2015, Shaul Nir and his wife were injured in a drive-by shooting while driving on Highway 55 near the Israeli settlement of Avnei Hefetz. In 2023, their son, Yitzhak Nir, was involved in a controversy after being identified as shooting Palestinian Zakaria al-Adra in the village of At-Tuwani shortly after the October 7 attacks.

== See also ==
- Jewish terrorism
- Israeli settler violence
- Zionist political violence
