= Baituna al-Talhami Museum =

Museum in Bethlehem, Palestine

Coordinates: 31.70474°N 35.20506°E

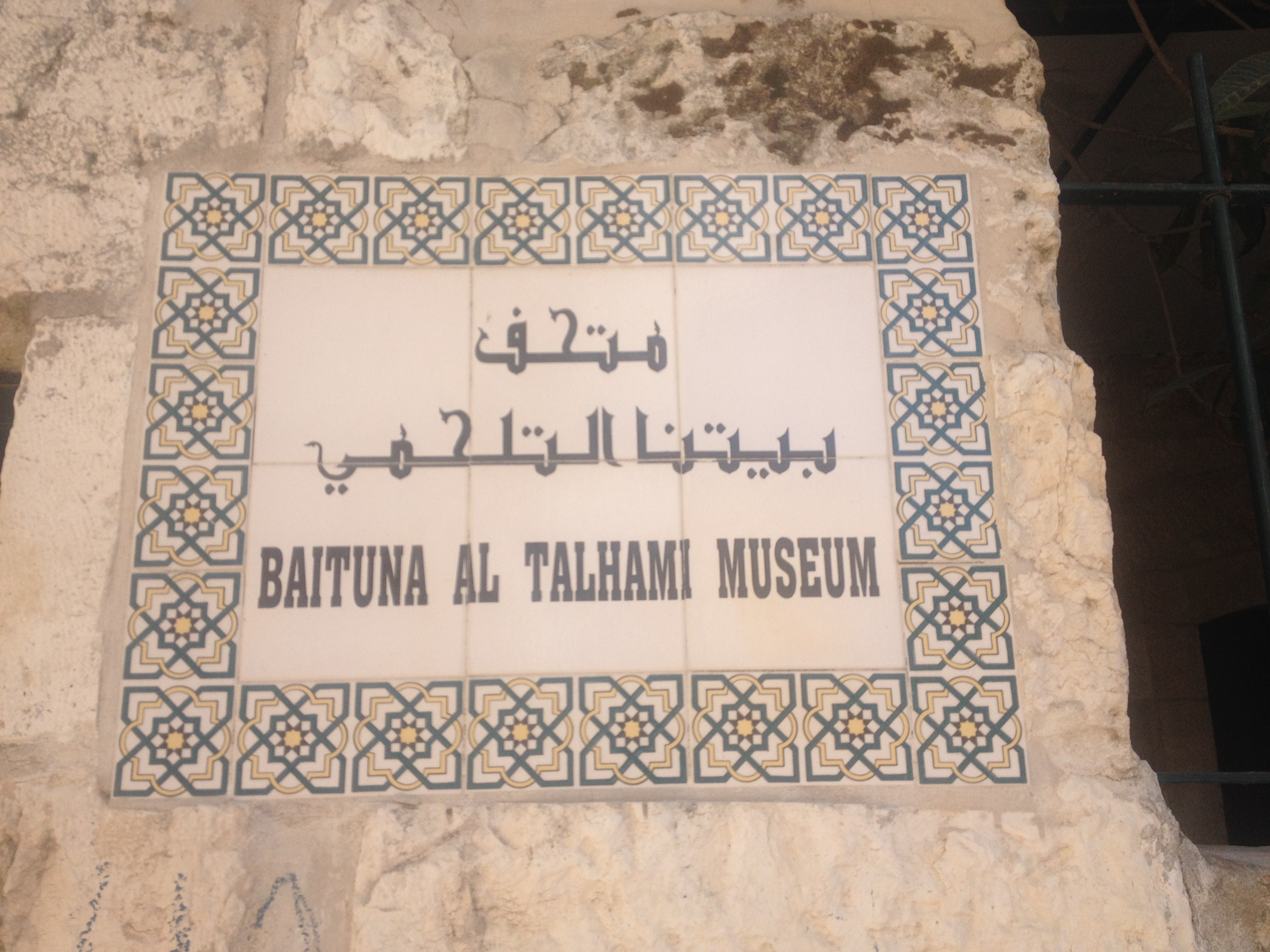
Baituna al-Talhami Museum name sign in Bethlehem, Palestine

Baituna al-Talhami Museum (Arabic: متحف بيتنا التلحمي), also known as Bethlehem Folklore Museum or The Museum of Traditional and Popular Art, is a museum located in Bethlehem, Palestine, on Star Street, slightly off Pope Paul VI Street. Its rooms are designed to resemble those in a traditional nineteenth-century Palestinian home, containing a selection of pictures, clothing and jewelry, alongside the tools used to produce them.

It was originally set up by the Arab Women's Union (AWU) in 1948, under Julia Dabdoub, as a center for Palestinian refugees fleeing their villages to eat, and practice in traditional embroidery for income. The AWU established the museum in 1979. It consists of two houses of typical Palestinian architecture, which include a renovated kitchen, a diwan room, a bedroom and an upper floor or illeyeh. The contents of the museum included a collection of traditional Palestinian household items displayed in an old house. The amount of items increased after a campaign amongst Bethlehem's prominent families to donate their traditional belongings commenced. Many items were thus saved from withering away in the basements of homes.

In 1984, the museum was expanded to include an adjacent old house which had been restored. This new house, according to Julia Dabdoub, "is one of the few authentic old houses left in Bethlehem… similar to the house in which Jesus was born." In 1992, Dabdoub donated her forty-year collection of photographs, furniture, and works of art to furnish the upper room or "al-Illiyeh" which shows the life of Bethlehem residents between 1900 and 1932.

Although Baituna al-Talhami is run as a museum, it still serves and employs refugees, as well as host festivals celebrating Palestinian artists, poets and writers.

== See also ==
- List of museums in Palestine
- Al-Badd Museum for Olive Oil Production
