= Central Archives of Gaza City =

Municipal archive in Gaza City, Gaza Strip, Palestine

- Interactive map of Central Archives of Gaza City
- 31°30′25″N 34°27′36″E
- Alternative name: أرشيف غزة المركزي
- Location: Gaza City, Palestine
- Type: National archives
- Dissolution: 2023 (destroyed)

The Central Archives of Gaza City (Arabic: أرشيف غزة المركزي, arshif ghaza almarkazi) was an archive and study centre in Gaza, Palestine. The centre was destroyed in late November 2023 during the Gaza war.

The Central Archives were kept within the administrative buildings of Gaza City. The archive contained materials that documented the lives of Palestinians going back 150 years, as well as material relating to urban development.

== Destruction ==
Al Jazeera reported the building had been targeted repeatedly since the October 7 attacks. The New Arab reported that heavy shelling in late November led to its destruction, including, according to Middle East Eye, a bombing on 29 November. The Palestinian branch of International Council on Monuments and Sites (Icomos) reported the archives completely destroyed. Images were released by Birzeit University and local press on social media, showing the vast majority of flammable material reduced to ashes. Khalil Sayegh, a Palestinian analyst, related the destruction to the 1982 theft of material relating to the Palestine Liberation Organization (PLO) from the Palestinian Research Centre in Beirut.

Gaza Municipality said that the bombing caused a major fire in the Municipality headquarters, according to the Palestinian Information Center.

== Responses by international archivist and history associations ==
The International Council on Archives put out a statement condemning "all actors in the region" drawing on The Universal Declaration on Archives. The Oral History Society, said it would "do its best to support the recording and remembering of that history when the rebuilding of Gaza can begin". Other statements were shared by the Association of Canadian Archivists, amongst others.

Efforts to record and archive remaining digitized archives involve the online repository Palestinian Nexus.

== See also ==
- List of museums in the State of Palestine
- Outline of the Gaza war
- Al Qarara Cultural Museum
- Destruction of cultural heritage during the Gaza war
