= Siege of Al-Qarara =

2023–2024 engagement of the Gaza war

- Part of the Israeli invasion of the Gaza Strip during the Gaza war
Date	6 December 2023 – 7 April 2024 (4 months and 1 day); Siege: 12 December 2023 – 10 January 2024 (4 weeks and 1 day)
Location	Al-Qarara, Gaza Strip, Palestine 31.368158622143625°N 34.33525976144858°E
Result	Palestinian victory
Territorial changes	Israel retreats from Al-Qarara; Qarara Battalion remains combat effective; Israel fails to capture senior Hamas officials or Israeli prisoners

Belligerents
Israel	Palestinian Joint Operations Room; Hamas; Palestinian Islamic Jihad; Democratic Front for the Liberation of Palestine

Commanders and leaders
(Israel) Unknown	(Palestine) Unknown

Units involved
(Israel) Israeli Defence Forces; Israeli Ground Forces; Bislamach Brigade; 7th Armored Brigade; Israeli Air Force	(Palestine) Palestinian Joint Operations Room; (Hamas) Al-Qassam Brigades; (Hamas) Qarara Battalion; (Palestinian Islamic Jihad) Al-Quds Brigades; (Democratic Front for the Liberation of Palestine) National Resistance Brigades

Casualties and losses
(Israel) Unknown	(Palestine) Unknown

The siege of Al-Qarara was a military engagement between invading Israeli forces and local Palestinian forces. It began on 6 December 2023, with al-Qarara being seen as a key town to control supply lines for the Israel army heading into Khan Yunis. The battle resulted in significant damage to al-Qarara, with much of its infrastructure being destroyed alongside substantial damage to its ecology and cultural sectors. However, the IDF withdrew in April having failed to dislodge Hamas and other Palestinian militants from the town.

== Siege ==
On the 6th of December, Israeli forces invaded Al-Qarara, clashing with Palestinian forces. On the 11th of December, Israeli forces attacked the areas of al-Sureij and al-Qarara. On 31 December, it was reported that Israeli forces had moved troops into Al–Sureij, tightening the siege around Al-Qarara. On the 10th of January, Al Jazeera was able to access Al-Qarara following Israeli retreat where it documented massive destruction and large number of deaths.

On the 3rd of March, Israeli forces resumed operations in Al-Qarara. On the 9th of March IDF Bislamach Brigade clashed with Palestinian militants in Qarara. Hamas' Qarara Battalion remained combat effective. On the 16th of March, Israel made small advances in Al-Qarara.

On March 20, Hamas stated that it had blown up a tunnel operated by Israeli forces, killing and wounding a number of Israeli soldiers.

On March 21, Israeli 7th Brigade clashed with Palestinian forces who targeted their tanks with RPGs. On the 24th of March, Israel targeted a Hamas meeting in Qarara. On the 29th of March, Palestinian Islamic Jihad and Democratic Front for the Liberation of Palestine separately claimed a series of attacks in Al-Qarara. On the 2nd of April, IDF 7th Brigade conducted an airstrike targeting Palestinian militants and weapon depots in Qarara. On the 3rd of April, IDF reported to have destroyed a rocket launcher inside an olive garden in Al-Qarara. On the 7th of April, 2024 Israeli forces withdrew from Al-Qarara and other areas in southern Gaza strip. They failed to find senior Hamas officials or hostages there despite intelligence indicating so.

== Cultural impact ==
Al-Qarara was home to the Al Qarara Cultural Museum, one of four museums in Gaza. It was opened in 2016 and had a collection of over 3,500 artifacts from Gaza dating back to as far as 4,000 BC. However, it was destroyed by Israeli airstrikes. Renovation efforts began in the months after the battle in August 2024. The Censorship and Freedom of Expression committee of the International Association of Art Critics criticized the damage to the museum, and the Euro-Med Human Rights Monitor described the destruction of the museum as destroying Palestinian cultural heritage.

== Ecological impact ==
Before the siege, al-Qarara was home to Gaza's only Baladi (indigenous) seed bank, founded by Hanadi Muhanna. It was aimed at preserving and protecting local seeds including wheat, spinach, barely and others for the purpose of combating the effects of imported seed on local farmers, climate change and the danger of extinction of local seed varieties. The seed bank collaborated with over 200 local farming families. However, during the campaign in al-Qarara it was destroyed by Israeli forces. Following its destruction and their displacement to Deir al-Balah, Hanadi and her family have started a new seed bank.

Al-Qarara was also home to vast agricultural lands including olive and citrus trees. However, 60% of its farmland was bulldozed by Israeli forces during the offensive, alongside 15 artisanal wells, a major water reservoir, and dozens of private wells. By February 2024, the bulk water supply scheme of al-Qarara was severely destroyed. In an analysis of Israeli bombing of al-Qarara it was noted that damage to water infrastructure 'may have resulted from attacks dispersed over a wide-area, as opposed to direct targeting of specific infrastructure locations, although targeting of an area could be influenced by the presence of [water sanitation and hygiene] infrastructure.'

== Aftermath ==
On 22 May 2024 Israeli announced a raid on Al-Qarara killing several Hamas fighters. On June 2, Israeli shelling of Al-Qarara was reported.

== Analysis ==
In an analysis of the battle, Maj. Gen. Fayez al-Duwairi stated that the IDF was attacking al-Qarara because of its importance as a supply line for its forces in the siege of Khan Yunis in the southern Gaza Strip, and pointed out that the IDF qualitative operations of the Palestinian militants in Gaza was effective as the IDF was unable to control the networks of tunnels in the area. Al-Duwairi later argued that Israel was forced to withdraw from al-Qarara due to its need of manpower to launch operations elsewhere, and that it had not succeeded in achieving its aims in the town.

== See also ==
- List of engagements during the Israel–Gaza war
- Siege of Khan Yunis
- Environmental impact of the Gaza war
