= Dura Museum =

Art and history museum in Dura, West Bank, Palestine

- متحف دورا
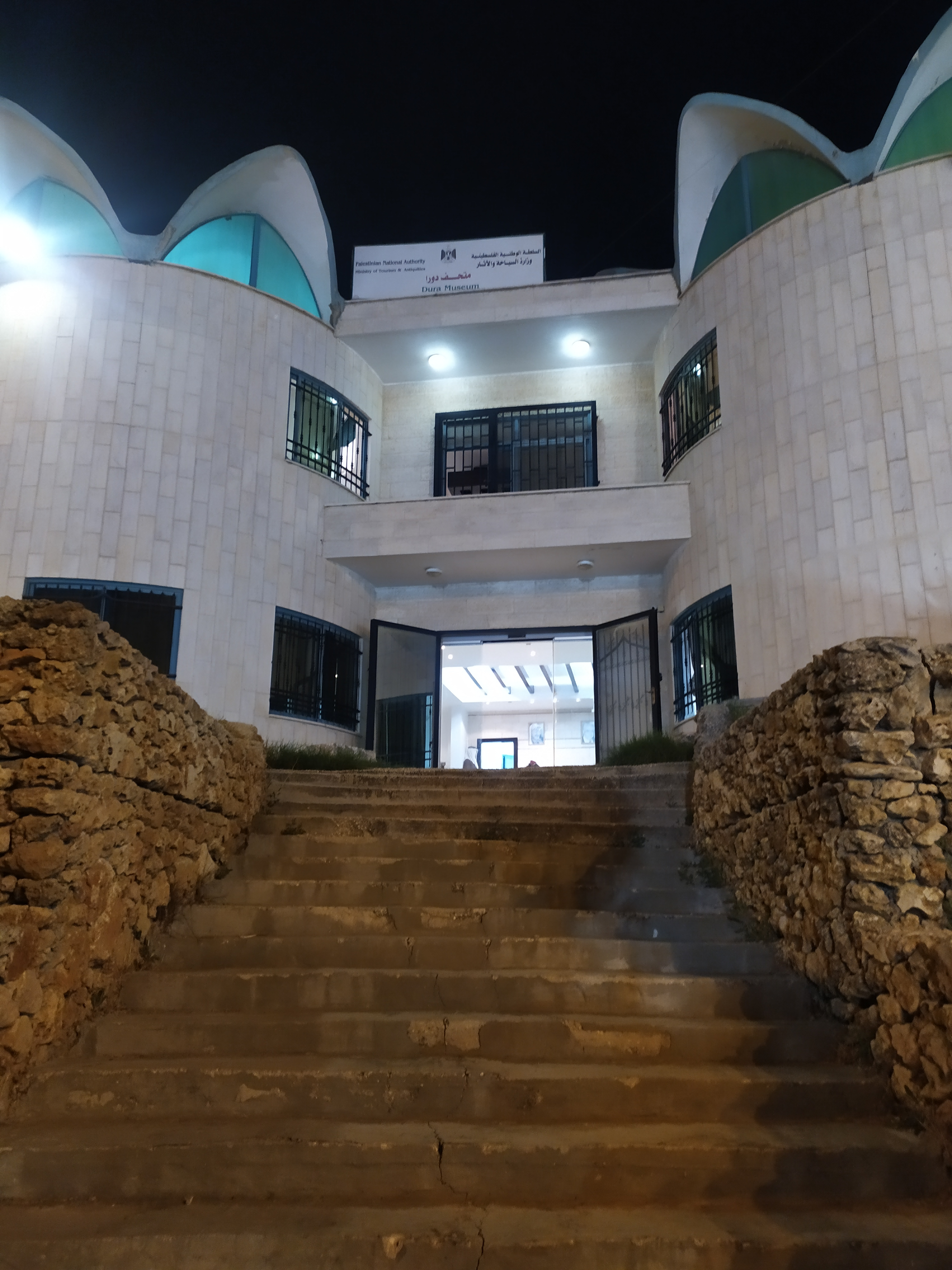
- Established: 2009
- Location: Dura, West Bank, Palestine
- Coordinates: 31°30′28.9″N 35°1′45.4″E
- Type: Art and history museum

The Dura Archaeological Museum is a museum in the center of Dura, in the Hebron Governorate of the southern West Bank, Palestine.

== Foundation ==
The museum was established in 2009 by the Dura Municipality, with support from the Palestinian Ministry of Tourism and Antiquities, the Department of Antiquities, and UNESCO. The building covers an area of 600 square metres and consists of two floors.

== Description ==
The museum includes a hall designed for students and visitors to view the displayed artifacts. It houses thousands of artifacts with the aim of promoting awareness about cultural heritage and preserving the collective memory of Palestine. The exhibits are arranged chronologically, representing the historical development of Palestine and other civilizations. Artifacts on display include items related to marriage, farming, agriculture, clothing, cooking utensils, jewellery, and decorative arts.

== See also ==
- List of museums in Palestine
- Al-Badd Museum for Olive Oil Production
- Tulkarm Museum
- Hisham's Palace
- Hebron University Museum

== Gallery ==
Collections and antiquities in the Dura Museum

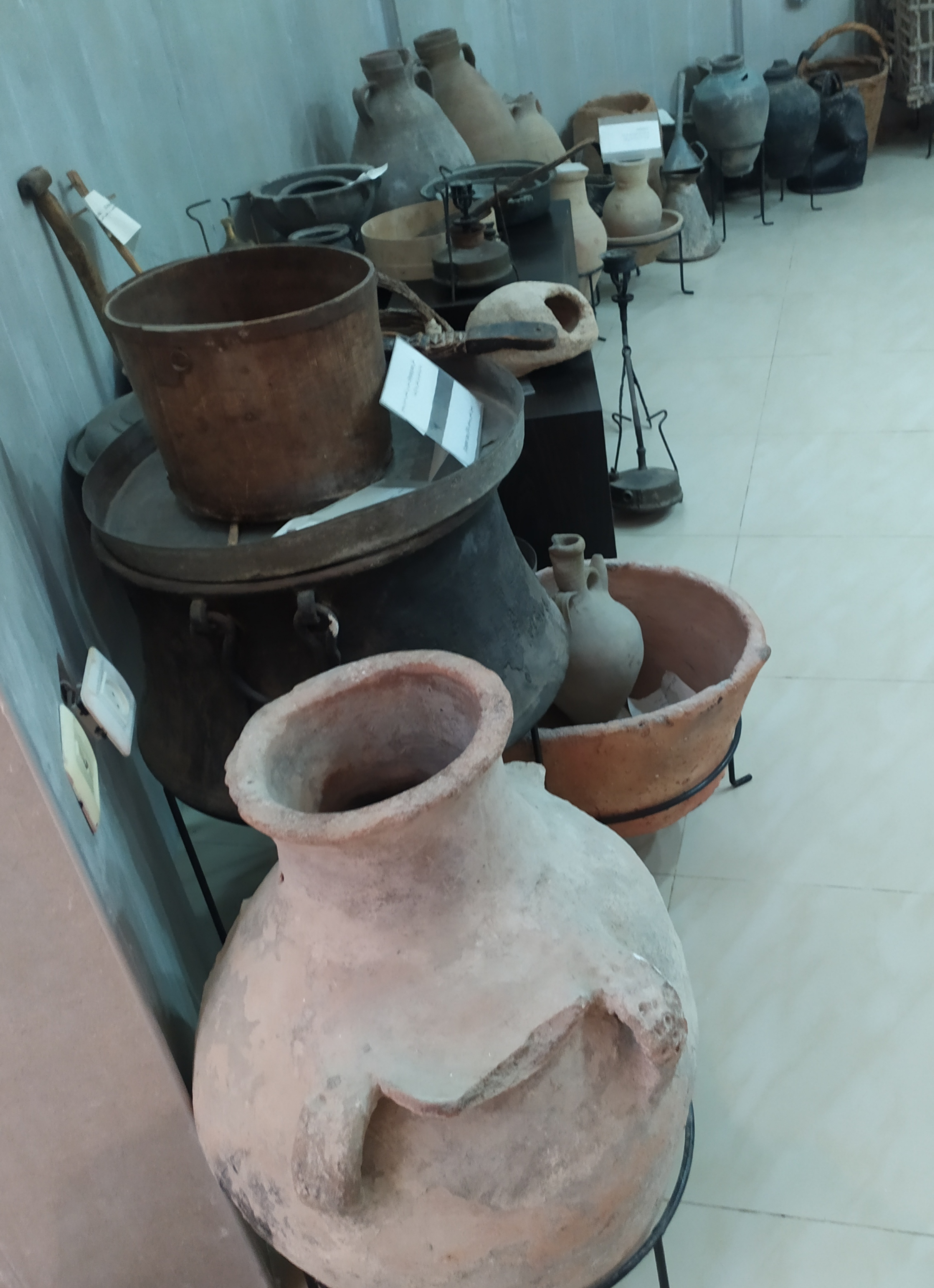
ancient pottery

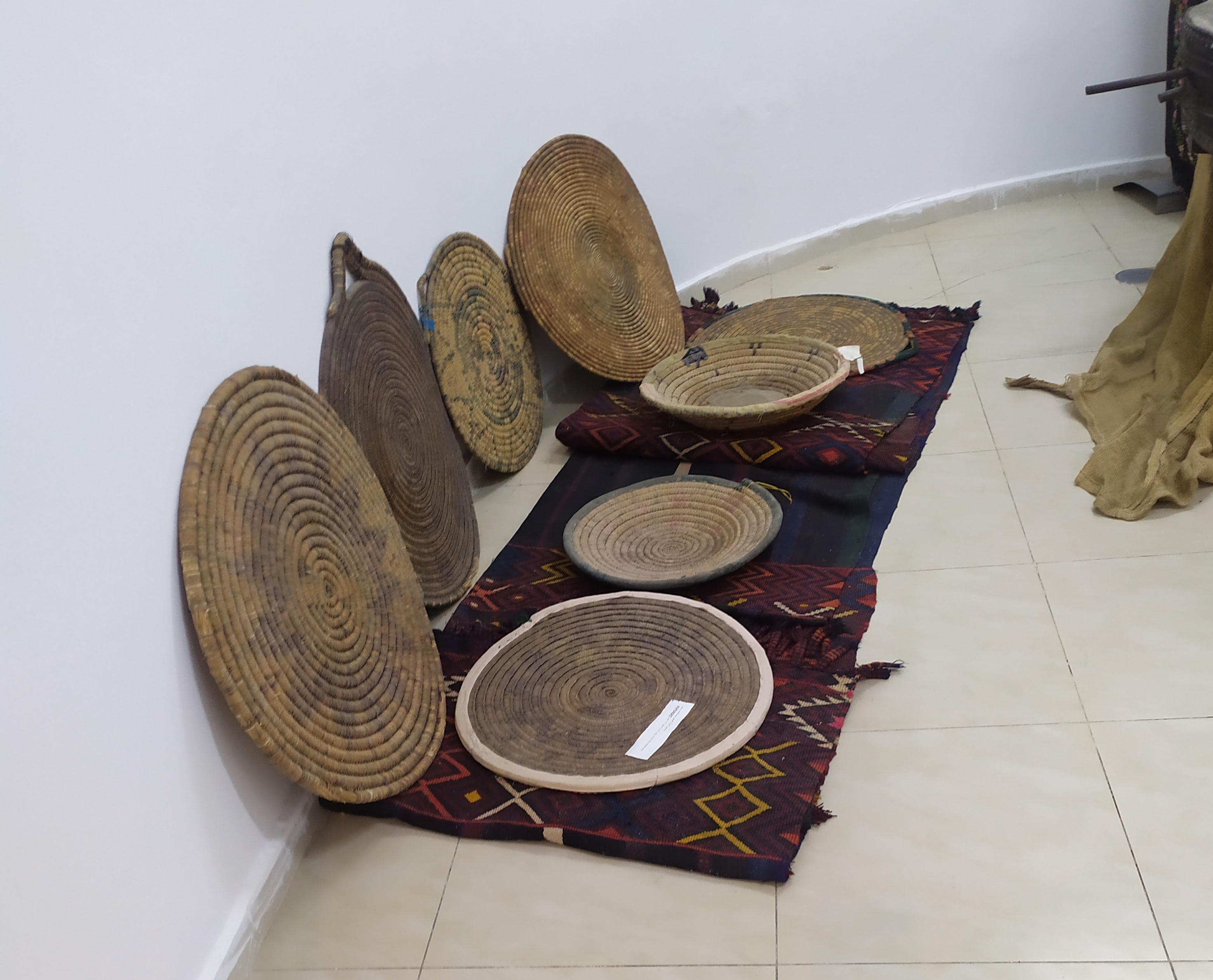
Wheat straw food trays

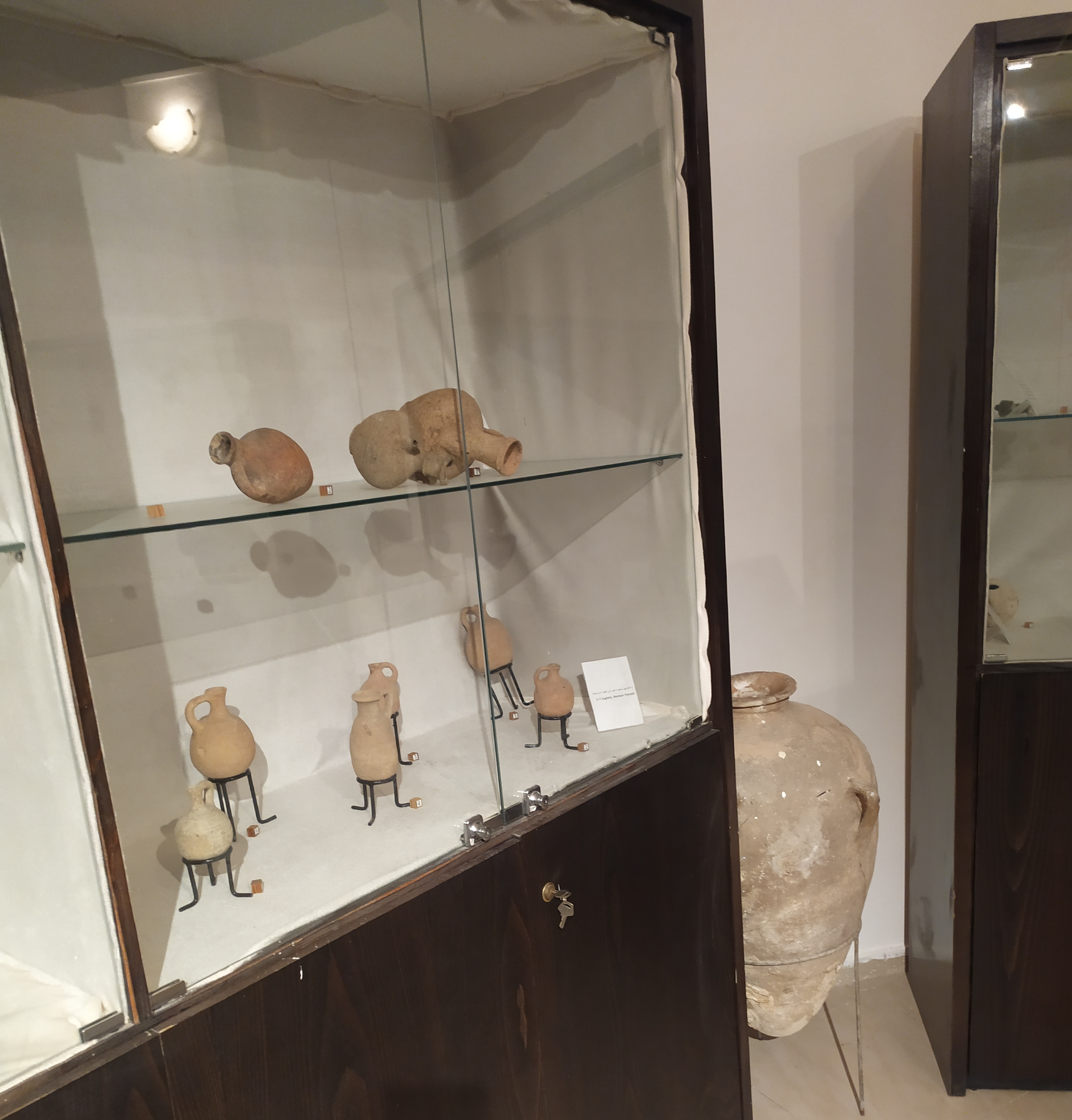
Antique utensils
