= Tulkarm Museum =

Museum in Tulkarm, West Bank, Palestine

- متحف طولكرم
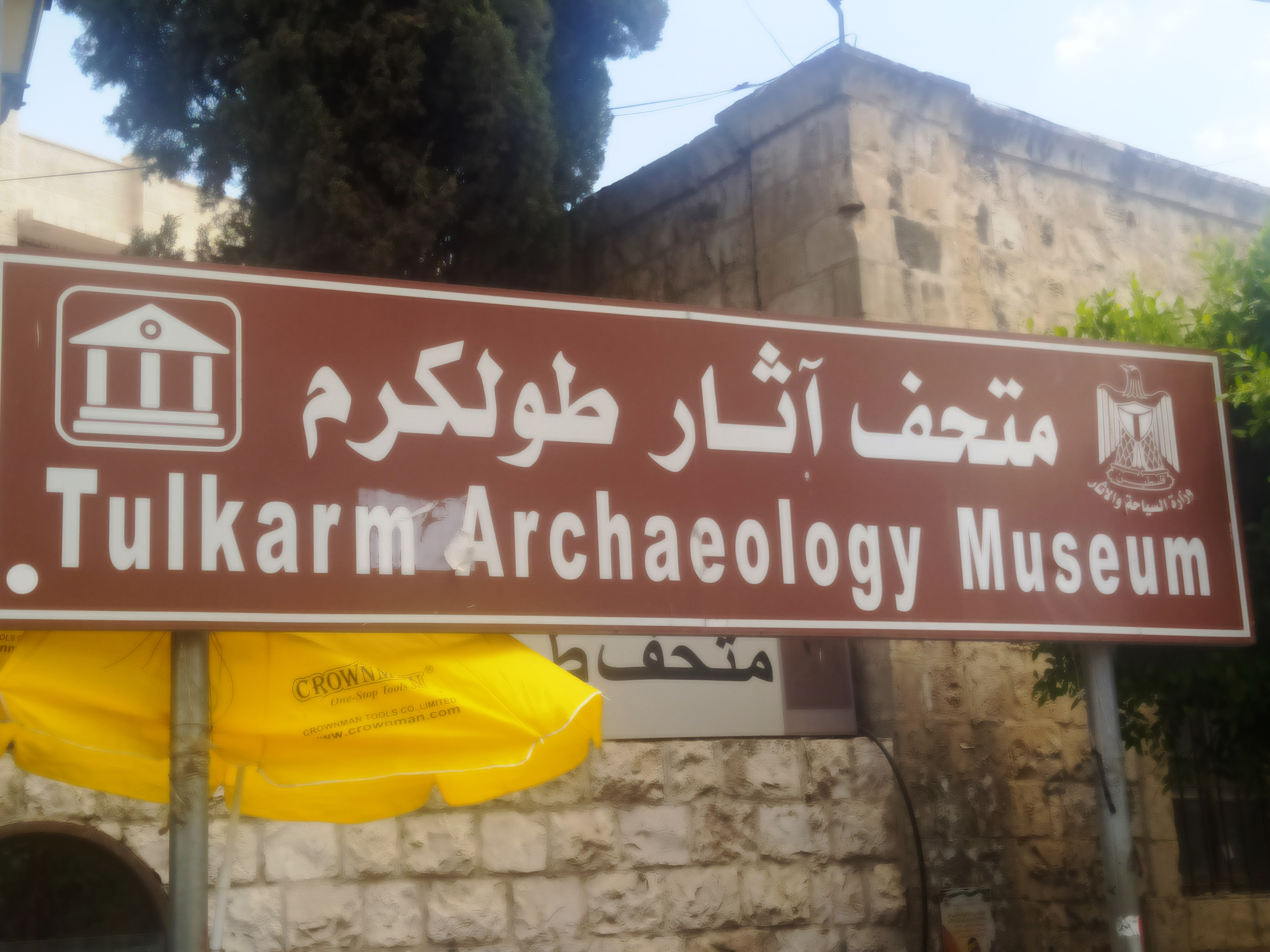
- Established: 1996
- Location: Tulkarm, West Bank, Palestine
- Coordinates: 32°18′50″N 35°01′42″E
- Type: Museum of historical monuments

Tulkarm Museum is a Palestinian archaeological and cultural heritage museum, established in 1996 by Tulkarm Municipality and the Ministry of Tourism and Antiquities (Palestine). It is located in the city of Tulkarm in the West Bank.

== Description ==
The museum is housed in a historic building constructed in 1908 and is the main museum in the northern West Bank. It was opened in 1996. It houses artifacts from various eras and welcomes delegations, tourists, visitors, and students from all regions and countries.

== Holdings ==
Approximately 750 artifacts dating from the Stone Age, Bronze Age, Iron Age, Roman era, and Byzantine era, along with ones relating to the History of Islam up to 1948, are held within the museum. They include a British military helicopter shot down by Palestinian revolutionaries in Tulkarm during the Great Palestinian Revolt of 1936. Large artifacts are on display in the museum garden, such as the oldest agricultural combine harvester in Palestine.

== Gallery ==
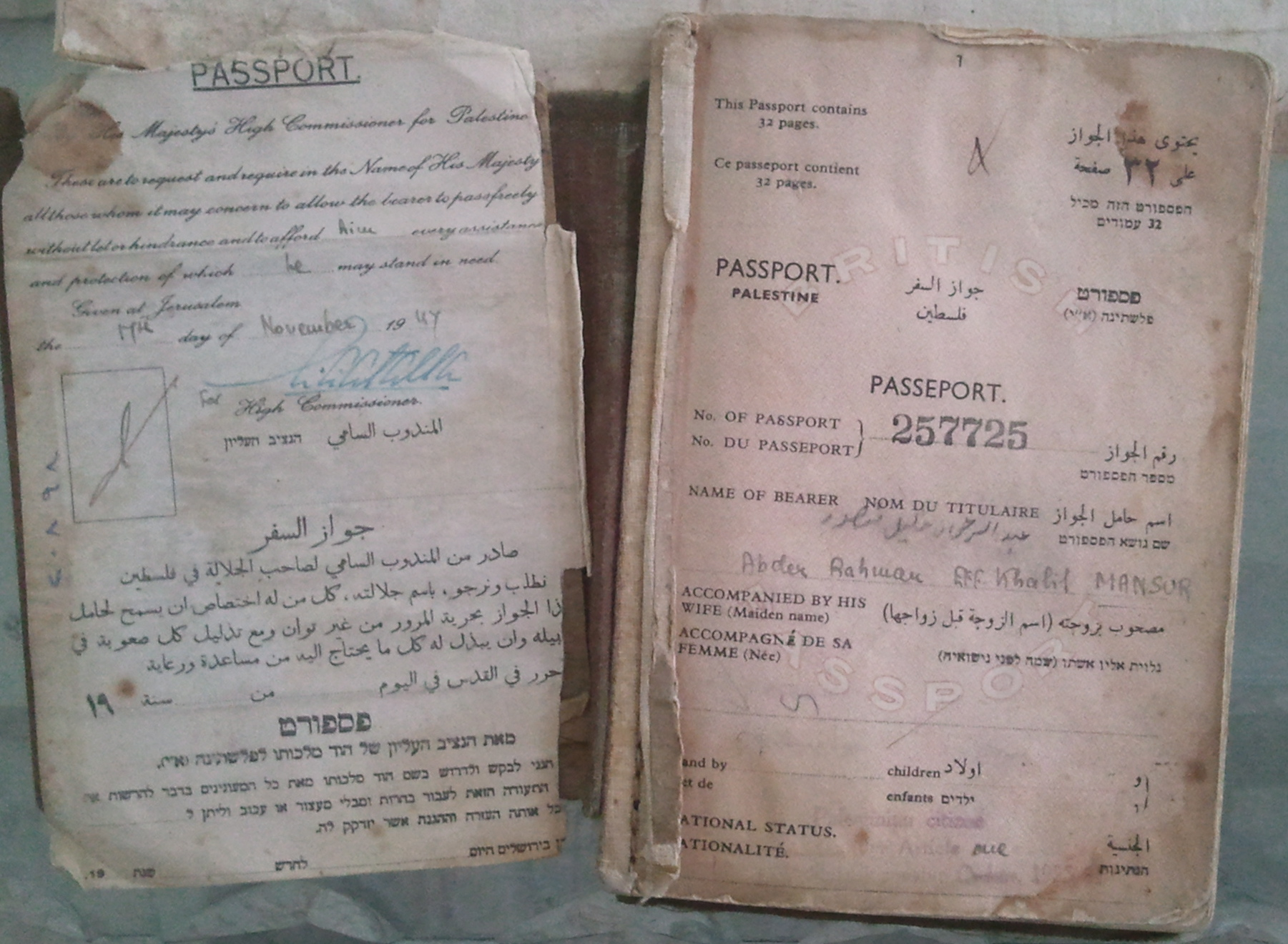
Old Palestinian passport

== See also ==
- List of museums in Palestine
- Dura Museum
- Hisham's Palace Museum
- Al-Badd Museum for Olive Oil Production
- Lists of museums
- Tulkarm Governorate
- Hebron University Museum
