= Six Crises =

1962 book by Richard Nixon

- First edition cover
- Author: Richard M. Nixon; Charles Lichenstein and others (ghostwriters)
- Language: English
- Genre: Memoir
- Publisher: Doubleday
- Publication date: 1962
- Publication place: United States
- Media type: Hardback
- ISBN: 9780671706197
- Followed by: RN: The Memoirs of Richard Nixon

Six Crises is the first book written by Richard Nixon, who later became the 37th president of the United States in 1969. It was published in 1962, and it recounts his role in six major political situations. Nixon wrote the book in response to John F. Kennedy's Pulitzer Prize–winning Profiles in Courage, which had greatly improved Kennedy's public image.

== Background and writing ==
Six Crises was Nixon's response to the John F. Kennedy book, Profiles in Courage (1955), which described the courage of eight US Senators. Kennedy sent Nixon a copy of his book, for which Nixon thanked him the next day. In 1961, following his 1960 presidential loss to Kennedy, Nixon was encouraged by Mamie Eisenhower to write a book about his experiences. On April 20, he visited Kennedy in the White House where Kennedy urged him to write a book; he said that doing so would raise the public image of any public man. Nixon met with a Doubleday book editor the same month.

Like Kennedy, Nixon used a ghostwriter for much of his book. The primary such writer was reportedly Charles Lichenstein. Years later, Nixon's editor at Doubleday, Kenneth McCormick, recounted: "I enjoyed working with him on 'Six Crises.' He had the concept for the book. He had the whole thing in his head, but he said, 'I'm not much of a writer,' and I said, 'I know.' So Nixon talked the book into a tape recorder and another writer came in to help. Then Nixon said, 'Why don't I try the chapter on defeat? In the course of doing this I think I've learned to write.' Well, he wrote that chapter himself, and it was fine. He really was an example of someone who could learn."

== Contents ==
The book is organized around the titular six stressful circumstances.

=== Alger Hiss case ===
In 1948, Nixon was a member of the United States House of Representatives serving on the House Un-American Activities Committee, which was investigating communism in the United States. He first rose to national prominence when the committee considered accusations that Alger Hiss, a high-ranking United States Department of State official, was a communist spy for the Soviet Union, allegations that remain a source of controversy.

A factual error in the book regarding this matter was used by opponents to criticize Nixon during the primary election of the 1962 California gubernatorial election.

=== Fund crisis and Checkers speech ===
In 1952, as a member of the United States Senate, Nixon was the vice presidential running mate of Republican presidential nominee Dwight D. Eisenhower. After he was accused during the campaign of having an improper political fund, he saved his political career and his spot on Eisenhower's ticket by making a nationally broadcast speech, commonly known as the Checkers speech. In the speech, he denied the charges and famously stated he would not be giving back one gift his family had received: a dog named Checkers.

=== Eisenhower's heart attack ===
In 1955, while Nixon was vice president, President Eisenhower suffered a serious heart attack while visiting his in-laws in Colorado; during the next several weeks, Nixon was effectively an informal "acting president".

=== Attack by a mob in Venezuela ===
In 1958, Nixon and his wife embarked on a goodwill tour of South America; while in Venezuela, their limousine was attacked by a pipe-wielding mob.

=== Kitchen debate in Moscow ===
In 1959, while still vice president, Nixon traveled to Moscow to engage in an impromptu debate with Soviet leader Nikita Khrushchev. The debate took place in a mock kitchen that was intended to show Soviet citizens how ordinary American families lived, and came to be known as the Kitchen Debate.

=== Loss in 1960 presidential campaign ===
While finishing his second term as vice president, Nixon became the Republican presidential nominee; in the 1960 United States presidential election, he lost an extremely close race to Senator John F. Kennedy.

== Commercial performance ==
Six Crises was a best seller at the time. Sales were of over 300,000 copies and it was excerpted at length in LIFE magazine.
