= List of museums in Palestine =

There are around thirty museums in Palestine. In 2022, there were 27 in the West Bank and five in the Gaza Strip.

== Museums ==
Museums in Palestine
Name	Image	Location	Date opened	Type	Description
Al-Badd Museum for Olive Oil Production		Bethlehem, near the Church of the Nativity 31°42′21.32″N 35°12′12.84″E	Late 18th century	Ethnography and archaeology museum	
Baituna al-Talhami Museum	A sign displaying the museum's name	Bethlehem, on Star Street	1979	Folk museum	
Palestine Museum of Natural History		Bethlehem	2017	Natural history museum	Mazin Qumsiyeh and Jessie Chang began developing the museum in 2014 and it was inaugurated in 2017. The museum works with communities facing poverty and records environmental destruction.
Riwaya Museum - Bethlehem Peace Center		Manger Square, Bethlehem			
Murad Castle Museum for Palestinian Heritage		Al-Khader			
The Palestinian Museum		Birzeit	2016	Cultural heritage museum	The museum was opened in 2016 and is privately funded. Its permanent collections include artworks, books and posters, and ethnographic materials such as clothing. Since 2018, the museum has run a digitisation programme, dealing with items for small institutions and private individuals. It houses the first textile conservation lab in Palestine, which was established in 2022.
Birzeit University Museum		Birzeit			
Qasr al-Basha (Pasha's Palace Museum)		Old City of Gaza	20th century	Archaeology museum	The museum is housed in a historic combining Mamluk and Ottoman architecture. The building was converted into a museum with funding from the United Nations Development Programme and used by the Department of Antiquities to displays artefacts. The museum housed a collection of 17,000 artefacts and was hit by an Israeli airstrike and bulldozed during the Gaza war.
Al Mat'haf		Gaza City		Archaeology museum	
Al Qarara Cultural Museum		Al-Qarara, Gaza Strip			
Yasser Arafat Foundation – Gaza Office					
Hebron University Museum					
Dura Museum					
Old Hebron Museum		Hebron	2021		
Hisham's Palace Museum		Jericho	20th century	Archaeology museum	The museum was renovated in 2000 and displays artefacts discovered at the palace.
Russian Museum		Jericho			
Akkad Museum		Gaza strip	1994	Archaeology museum	Contained 2,800 artifacts as of 2023, was established by Walid al-Aqqad.
Islamic Museum		East Jerusalem			
Abu Jihad Center and Museum for Captives, Al-Quds University					
Al-Quds University Science Museum					
Meet Math - Mathematics Museum		Abu Dis			
Palestine Archeological Museum		East Jerusalem	1921	Archaeology museum	Established in 1901 during Ottoman rule the Imperial Museum. In 1921, during the British Mandate for Palestine, a new museum was opened and the collections relocated. It also housed the Department of Antiquities during the period of the British Mandate. With periods administered by an international board and then Jordan, since 1967 the museum has been run by Israel and is used by the Israel Antiquities Authority. It displays artefacts excavated in Palestine. Following Israel's occupation the Dead Sea Scrolls were removed.
Palestinian Heritage Museum		East Jerusalem		Heritage museum	Before the museum's renovation in 2023 it received around 6,500 visitors per year.
Armenian Museum		Armenian Quarter, East Jerusalem			
Terra Sancta Museum		Christian Quarter, East Jerusalem			
Samaritans Museum, Mount Gerizim					
An-Najah National University's Museum of Palestinian Popular Heritage					
Education Museum inside Qalqilya Zoo		Qalqilya			
Mahmoud Darwish Museum		Ramallah			
Arafat Museum					
Khan Al-Bireh					
Tulkarm Museum				Archaeology and cultural heritage museum	
Al-Mentar / Al-Mintar Tulkarm Museum					
Tulkarm Archaeological Museum					

== See also ==
- Lists of museums
- List of libraries in Palestine
