= Attack on Richard Nixon's motorcade =

1958 attack on the motorcade of US Vice President

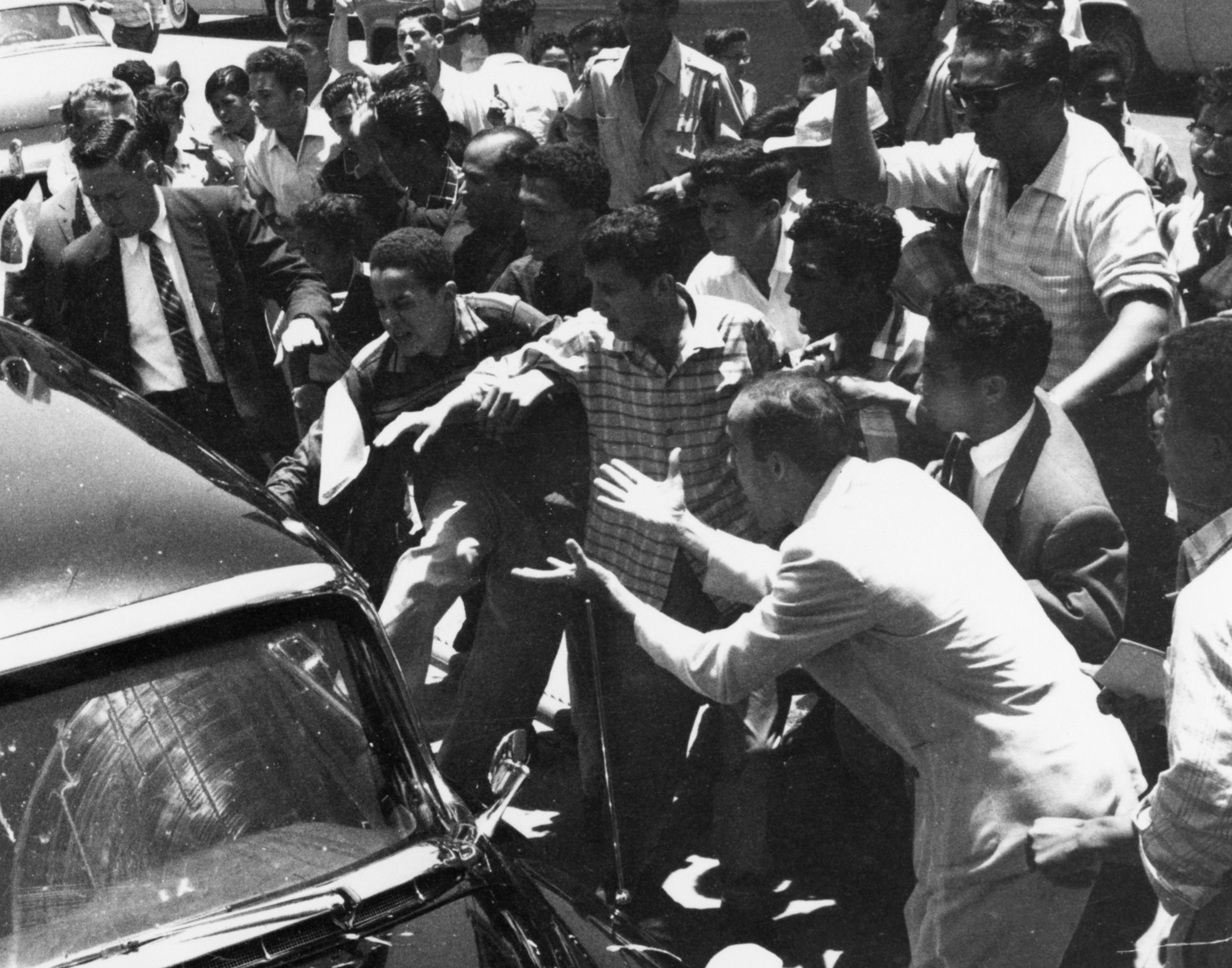
- Nixon's car attacked in Caracas
- Date: May 13, 1958
- Location: Caracas, Venezuela; 10°28′50″N 66°54′13″W
- Caused by: 1958 Venezuelan coup d'état; United States' decision to grant Marcos Pérez Jiménez asylum
- Result: President Eisenhower mobilizes aircraft carrier USS Tarawa along with eight destroyers and two amphibious assault ships towards Venezuela.; Early departure of Richard Nixon

Parties
Venezuelan protesters	Government of Venezuela	Government of the United States

Lead figures
Unknown, possibly organized by Communist Party of Venezuela	Wolfgang Larrazábal	Richard Nixon

Units involved
Unknown	Venezuelan Army; Caracas Municipal Police	U.S. Secret Service

Number
200–500	Unknown	12
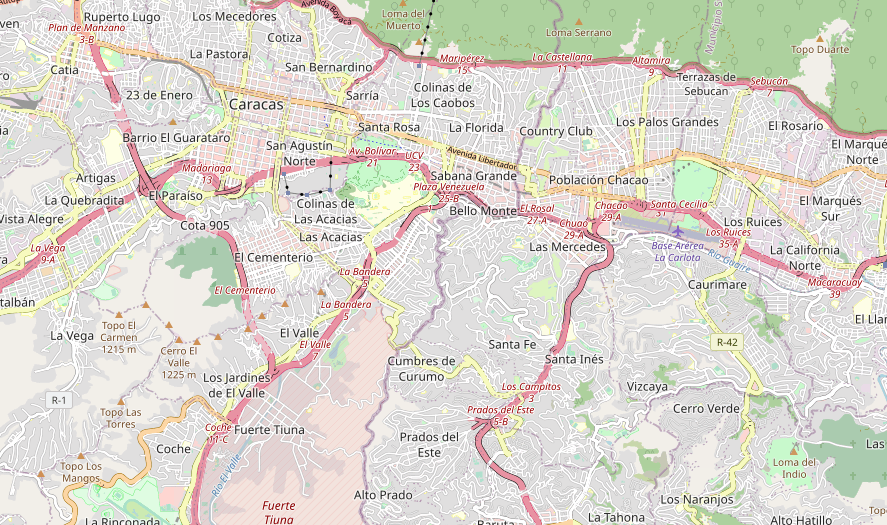
- Location within Caracas Location within Venezuela

On May 13, 1958, US vice president Richard Nixon's motorcade was attacked by a mob in Caracas, Venezuela, during Nixon's goodwill tour of South America. The event was described at the time as the "most violent attack ever perpetrated on a high American official while on foreign soil." Nixon was unharmed by the anti-war protesters but two of his aides were injured in the melee. The visit took place only months after the overthrow in January of Venezuelan dictator Marcos Pérez Jiménez, who in 1954 had been awarded the Legion of Merit and was later granted asylum by the United States, and the incident was allegedly orchestrated by the Communist Party of Venezuela. U.S. Navy Admiral Arleigh Burke mobilized fleet and Marine units to the region, compelling the Venezuelan government to provide full protection to Nixon for the remainder of the trip.

The attack was denounced by all major Venezuelan presidential candidates standing in that year's election, except for the incumbent leader Admiral Wolfgang Larrazábal. Nixon was generally applauded in American press reports for his calm and adept handling of the incident and was feted with a "hero's welcome" on his return to the United States. His recollections of the attack form one of the "six crises" explored in his 1962 book.

== Context ==
Richard Nixon's carefully planned 1958 tour of South America has been described as one of the "most important United States foreign policy events in post-WWII Latin America". It was undertaken at a time of confused United States intra-hemispheric relations; the role of Latin American states in the emerging American grand strategy of containment was unclear and ill-defined. However, a recent worldwide drop in commodity prices that badly affected South American economies, coupled with increasing Soviet overtures in the western hemisphere, made President Dwight D. Eisenhower determine that a tour by a major United States functionary was necessary to demonstrate its commitment to the region. Nixon retrospectively wrote that he was uninterested in taking the trip.

The tour was to see Nixon visit every independent country in South America except Brazil and Chile. (Note: Suriname and Guyana were not, at the time, independent.) Brazil had been omitted from the itinerary as Nixon had visited that nation the previous year. The Chilean leadership, meanwhile, were scheduled to be out of the country during the time period of Nixon's visit. Nixon was accompanied on his trip by his wife, Pat.

=== Early tour stops ===
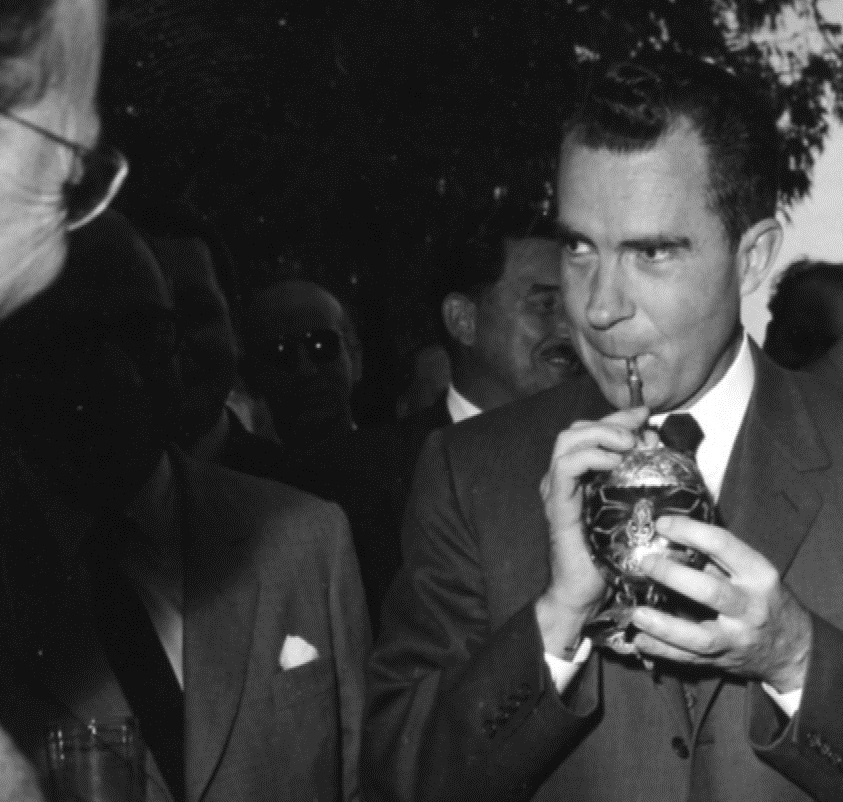
The early part of Nixon's tour went relatively smoothly. Here, he drinks mate at the Montevideo home of former Uruguayan president Luis Batlle Berres.

Nixon began his tour in Uruguay, arriving at Carrasco International Airport at 9:00 a.m. on April 28. There, he was greeted by senior Uruguayan officials. According to an Associated Press report at the time, about 40 students protested on the street corner as Nixon's motorcade proceeded into Montevideo. In Montevideo, Nixon made an unscheduled appearance at the University of the Republic and was generally well received by students. According to Nixon, he decided to make the unannounced stop because he felt that average Uruguayans would be receptive towards him, while scheduled and published visits were likely to attract organized demonstrations. This proved to be the case, and when communists arrived and tried to distribute literature, the students tore up the pamphlets.

The visit to Argentina was billed as the major stop of the trip and four days were allotted to the country, instead of the two slated for the other visits. In Buenos Aires, Nixon attended the presidential inauguration of Arturo Frondizi and spoke to several students and organized labor groups.

The first serious trouble on the tour materialized in Lima, Peru. Nixon's scheduled appearance at the University of San Marcos saw a large crowd of student demonstrators awaiting his arrival. In an event foreshadowing his famous visit to the Lincoln Memorial to meet anti-war protesters some years later, Nixon waded directly into the crowd of demonstrators, attended by only two staff members. Over the next few minutes, Nixon spoke with the students. However, a second faction of demonstrators soon began stoning the group, hitting one of Nixon's staff in the mouth and grazing the vice president's neck. The vice-president then withdrew and a later round-table with student leaders was canceled. Returning to his hotel, Nixon and his staff had to push through demonstrators who had encamped outside, during which Nixon was struck in the face. Eisenhower cabled Nixon at his next stop, in Quito, Ecuador:

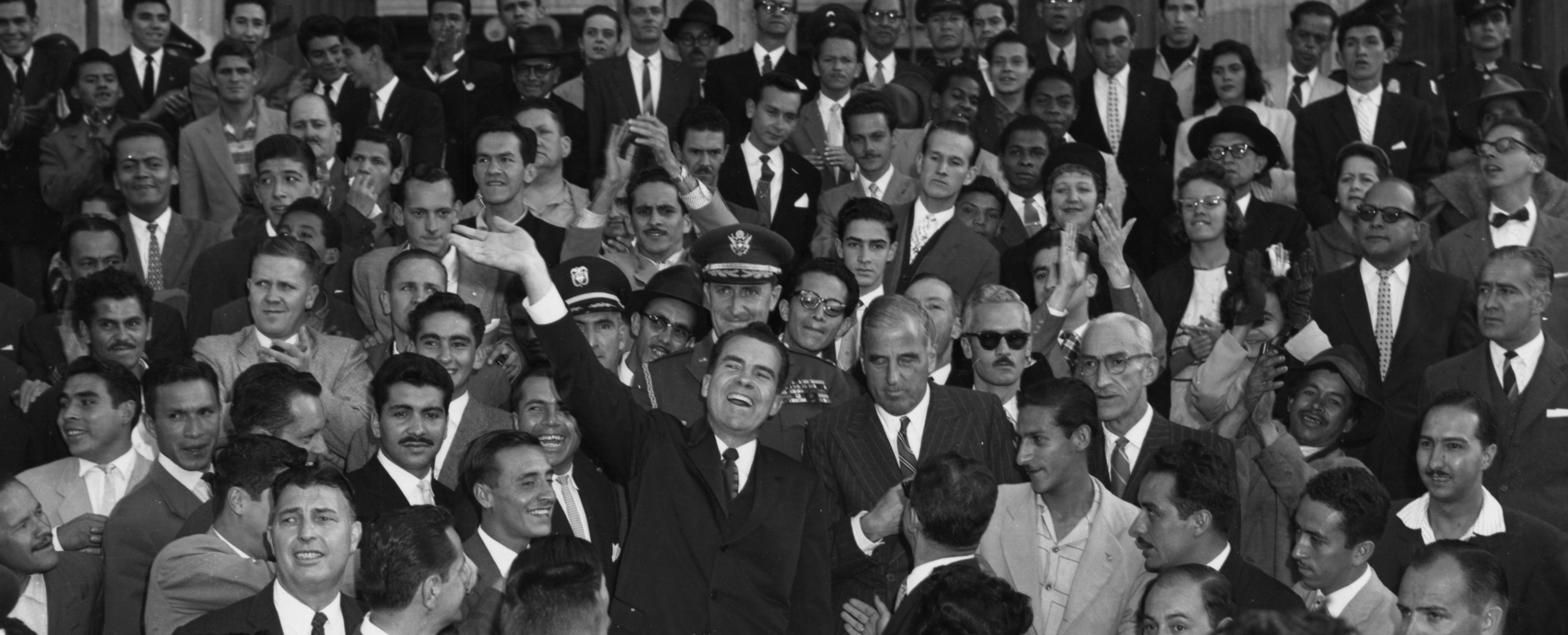
Nixon, pictured here in Bogotá in 1958, was well-received during his stop in Colombia

Dear Dick: Your courage, patience, and calmness in the demonstration directed against you by radical agitators have brought you new respect and admiration in our country. I am certain that the vast majority of citizens both in Peru and in the United States deplore the incident caused by a few. I note with satisfaction that the Peruvian Government has already expressed to you its regret. Indeed, I feel that every participant in the mob will finally come to feel a sense of guilt and embarrassment because of his failure to show a friendly visitor the ordinary measure of courtesy and hospitality. Give my love to Pat and warm regards to you.

Nixon's final stop before Venezuela and Colombia saw generally receptive crowds. At Bolívar Square in Bogotá, he laid a wreath at the statue of Simón Bolívar before a crowd of about 1,000. An Associated Press report noted that there were some hecklers in the audience, but they amounted to "about 80 youths" and observed that "generally ... the Colombian crowds were friendly or enthusiastic".

== Tour in Venezuela ==
=== Background ===
Earlier in 1958, the disliked Venezuelan dictator Marcos Pérez Jiménez had been overthrown in a popular uprising and had gone into exile in the United States. A military junta formed a caretaker government to rule the country until new elections could be held. Admiral Wolfgang Larrazábal, head of the governing junta, had announced his intention to stand in those elections; his candidacy was backed by a coalition of parties, including the Venezuelan Communist Party. The United States' earlier decision to award Pérez Jiménez the Legion of Merit on 12 November 1954 and after his overthrow to grant him asylum combined to create a charged atmosphere leading up to Nixon's arrival. The Caracas municipal council even passed a resolution effectively declaring Nixon persona non grata. Prior to Nixon's arrival in Caracas, media reported on rumors that an attempt had been planned on the vice-president's life during his visit. The CIA station chief in Venezuela, United States ambassador to the country, and embassy staff all recommended against Nixon's visit.

In an interview conducted after he retired from government service, Robert Amerson, then-press attache to the United States embassy in Venezuela, said that the demonstrators who disrupted the Venezuela stop on the tour "had been bused down by the professional agitators and organizers" affiliated with the Communist Party of Venezuela. (Note: Amerson would later write a letter to The New York Times in which he questioned if "Caracas dramatized to him that since local conditions primarily caused anti-American sentiment, international Communism might not really be monolithic. This may have influenced his Presidential decisions to deal directly with Communist leaders in China and the Soviet Union.") This view was one echoed in a report issued by William P. Snow, acting Assistant Secretary of State for Inter-American Affairs, who wrote that "the pattern of organization and of slogans in all cases points to Communist inspiration and direction, as do certain of the intelligence reports". Nixon himself also blamed communist instigation. A Universal Newsreel at the time characterized it as "another of the well-planned campaigns of harassment" and a "communist-sparked onslaught". Venezuelan liberal journalist Carlos Rangel has indicated the "Nixon carnival" was organized by the Venezuelan Communist Party as a way of demonstrating that it had the ability to "dominate the streets, that the Caracas masses were ready to be mobilized".

=== Arrival ===
Nixon arrived, via air, in Caracas on May 13, 1958. According to a U.S. Secret Service report of the incident, a crowd of demonstrators at the airport "purposely disrupted ... [the] welcoming ceremony by shouting, blowing whistles, waving derogatory placards, throwing stones, and showering the Nixons with human spittle and chewing tobacco". Life's Donald Wilson told his magazine that "they were out to get Nixon from the moment he stepped off his plane". The New York Herald Tribune's Earl Mazo wrote that "Venezuelan troops and police seemed to evaporate. The vice-president and the whole official party literally had to fight their way to cars behind a thin but sturdy phalanx of U.S. Secret Service agents". The original itinerary had Nixon moving from the airport to the National Pantheon of Venezuela where he was to lay a wreath at the tomb of Simón Bolívar. However, a United States naval attache sent ahead with the wreath reported a crowd that had assembled at the Pantheon had attacked him and torn up the wreath. At this point it was decided to proceed directly to the U.S. embassy.

=== Attack ===
For the first time on the South America tour, the Nixons traveled in closed-top cars as opposed to convertibles, a decision later credited with saving their lives.

As the Nixons traveled by motorcade through Caracas, the vehicle carrying the vice-president was slowed to a crawl by heavy traffic. (Note: According to Drew Pearson, citing secondhand information, Nixon had personally insisted the press truck drive ahead of his vehicle. The larger vehicle could only manage 25 miles per hour, which slowed the entire motorcade to the point the mob was able to stop it.) Life's Wilson wrote that a crowd of several hundred "raced toward their quarry and engulfed Nixon's car", stoning it and banging on the windows with their fists. Nixon was protected by twelve United States Secret Service agents, some of whom were injured in the melee. Reporter Bruce Henderson and other Americans were nearby. He wrote, "I was an American and here before my eyes the Vice President of the U.S. was on the verge of very possibly being beaten to death". According to the Secret Service, Venezuelan police declined to intervene to clear the crowd. When the mob began rocking the car back and forth in an attempt to overturn it, U.S. Secret Service agents, believing the vice president's life was in jeopardy, drew their firearms and prepared to begin shooting into the crowd; in an act described by historian Rick Perlstein as "the kind of presence of mind for which battlefield commanders win medals", Nixon ordered Secret Service agent-in-charge Jack Sherwood to hold fire and shoot only on his orders. No shots were ultimately fired.

Nixon would later recount that Venezuelan Foreign Minister Óscar García Velutini, who was traveling with him, was "close to hysterics" and kept repeating "this is terrible, this is terrible". According to Nixon, Velutini explained the police inaction was because the communists "helped us overthrow Pérez Jiménez and we are trying to find a way to work with them". Nixon's longtime secretary, Rose Mary Woods, was injured by flying glass when the windows of the car in which she was riding, following Nixon, were smashed. Vernon Walters, then a mid-ranking U.S. Army officer serving as Nixon's translator, would end up with a "mouthful of glass", and Velutini was also hit by shards of the limousine's supposedly "shatter-proof" glass.

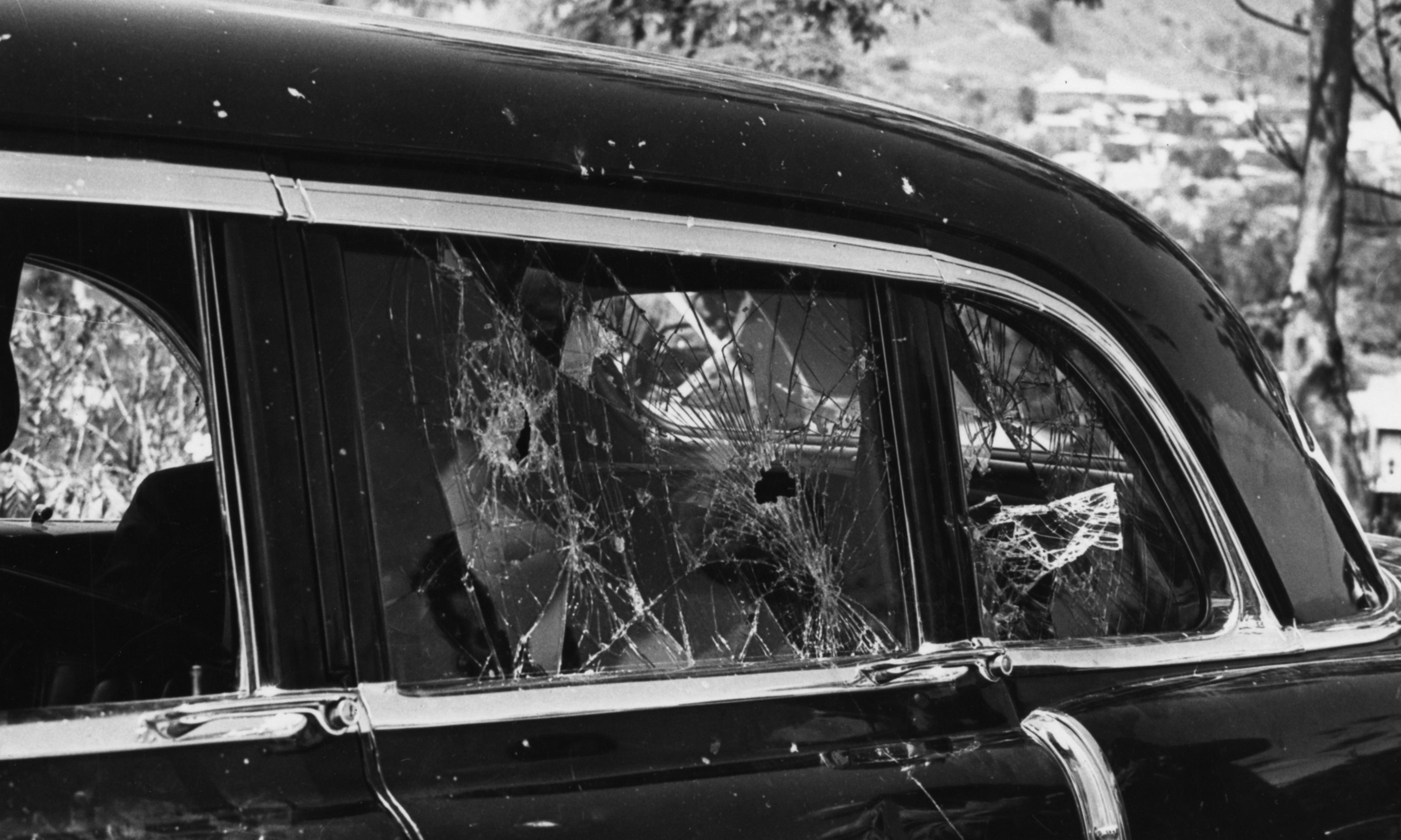
Nixon's car. Even though it was equipped with shatter-proof glass, it was barely able to withstand the pummeling it received from the crowd.

Two different accounts explain how Nixon's car was ultimately able to escape the mob and continue to the embassy. According to one version of events, the U.S. press corps' flatbed truck, accompanying the motorcade, was used to clear a path through the crowd. In Nixon's remembrance of the incident, Associated Press photographer Hank Griffin at one point had to use his camera to beat back a protester who tried to mount the truck. According to a second account, soldiers of the Venezuelan Army arrived and cleared the traffic, thereafter moving the mob back at bayonet-point to allow Nixon's car to pass. Life wrote that the police opened a route for the car. The incident was over 12 minutes after it began.

=== Embassy ===
Shortly after the Nixons arrived at the embassy, the Venezuelan army surrounded and fortified the chancellery, reinforcing the small U.S. Marine guard force. Their assistance had earlier been requested by the U.S. ambassador. That afternoon, members of the ruling junta arrived at the embassy and lunched with Nixon. The next morning, representatives of Venezuela's major labor unions came to the embassy and requested an audience with Nixon, which was granted. The union leaders apologized for events of the preceding day and disclaimed involvement, though, United States Air Force officer Manuel Chavez (Note: Chavez was a relative of Senator Dennis Chávez.) – at the time attached to the embassy – wrote in 2015 that "they probably were the instigators or at least encouraged the actions".

=== U.S. mobilization ===
Upon learning of the incident, Chief of Naval Operations Admiral Arleigh Burke ordered the airlift of elements of the 2nd Marine Division and the 101st Airborne Division to staging areas in Puerto Rico and Guantánamo Bay, Cuba. The aircraft carrier USS Tarawa, along with eight destroyers and two amphibious assault ships, were ordered to put to sea towards Venezuela. The U.S. mobilization was code-named "Operation Poor Richard".

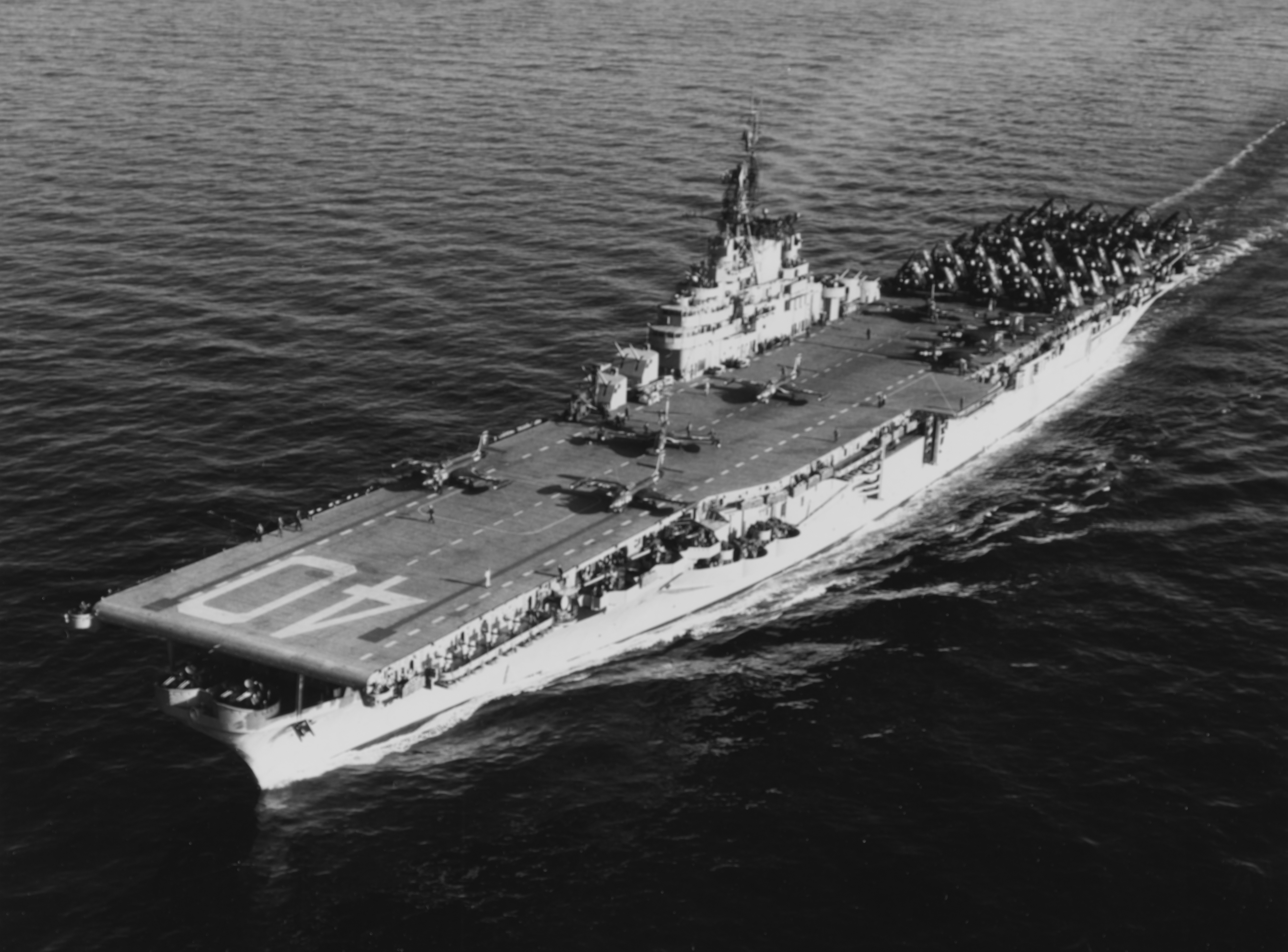
A fleet of 12 ships centered on USS Tarawa, pictured here in 1952, was ordered to Venezuela once news of the attack on Nixon reached Washington

According to U.S. officials at the time, the forces mobilized were being readied to enter Venezuela to "cooperate with the Venezuelan government", though later accounts suggest President Eisenhower was preparing to "invade Venezuela" should Nixon suffer further indignity. Privately, Eisenhower was reportedly furious at the attack on Nixon and, at one point, told his staff "I am about ready to go put my uniform on".

Nixon was shocked after learning about the mobilization and wondered why they were not consulted, but later found out that communications between Caracas and Washington had been cut for a critical period immediately after the riot that afternoon.

In response to the movement of American military forces into the region, Admiral Larrazábal pledged the Nixon party would be "protected fully" thereafter.

=== Return to the United States ===
Additional activities were canceled, and Nixon departed Caracas the next morning, seven hours early. His motorcade to the airport was protected by a major deployment of Venezuelan Army infantry and armored forces in the capital. Nixon described having taken the same route as before, whose streets were empty and heavily patrolled after the whole area had been tear-gassed.

==== American reaction ====
The Nixons stopped in Puerto Rico before returning to Washington. Eisenhower ordered that Nixon should receive a "hero's welcome" on his return; all U.S. government employees in Washington were given the day off work to turn out for the arrival of the vice-president. Nixon deplaned before "a cheering crowd of 10,000" that included the congressional leadership and ambassadors from most Latin American countries. Eisenhower personally greeted Nixon at the airport and the two then traveled to the White House along a route lined by 100,000 people.

Life credited Nixon for his "courage" and said "his coolness had been remarkable". According to Pathé News, Nixon reflected "calm, rather than concern." For weeks after the attack, Nixon received standing ovations "wherever he went ... a new high in his life". While Life surmised that the trip "had added immeasurably to the stature at home of a man most likely to run for President in 1960", The New Republic claimed the attack was a hoax set up to help Nixon's chances in the election.

All 12 agents of Nixon's Secret Service detail received the Decoration for Exceptional Civilian Service from Eisenhower at Nixon's request.

==== Venezuelan reaction ====
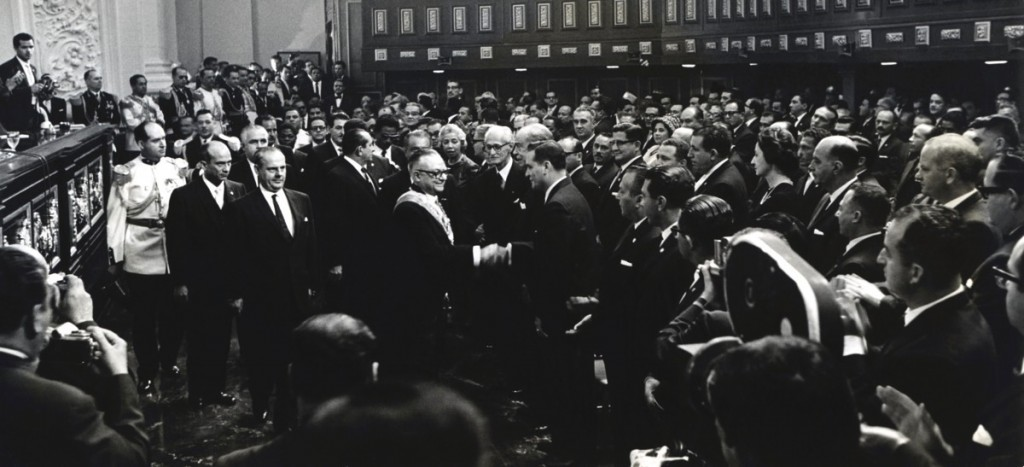
Rómulo Betancourt greets Larrazábal after taking oath in the National Congress

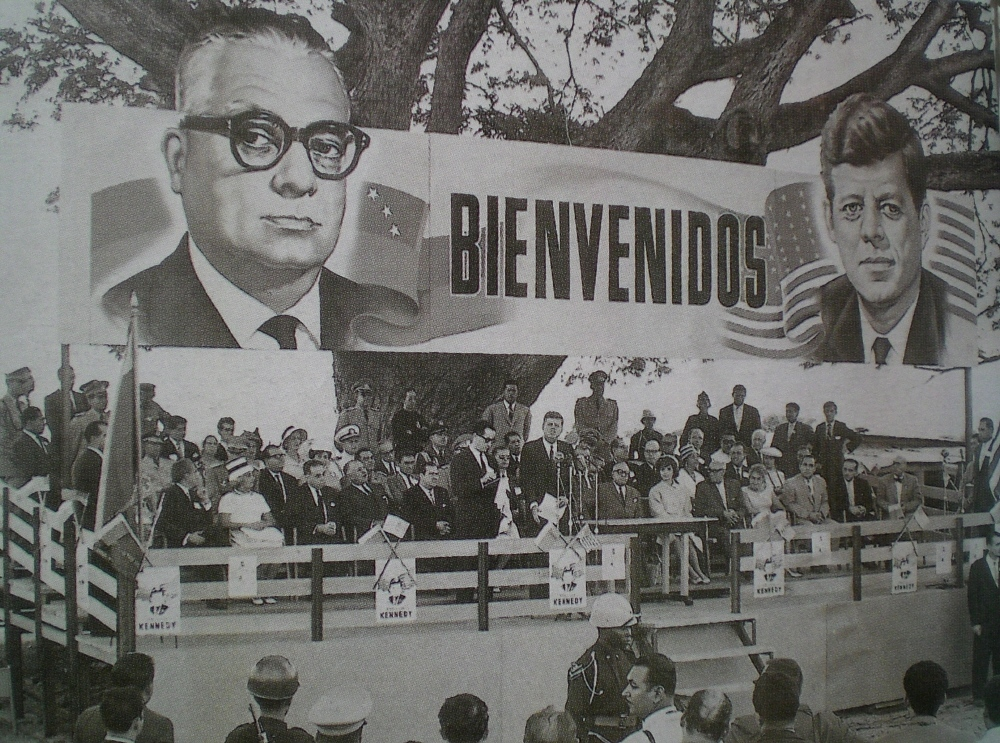
John F. Kennedy visit to Venezuela with Rómulo Betancourt

In Venezuela, all major presidential candidates standing in the 1958 general election denounced the attack except for the incumbent president, Admiral Larrazábal. After Nixon's departure, Larrazábal said that he would have joined the protests if he were a student. Despite receiving strong backing by the communists, Larrazábal lost the election to Rómulo Betancourt.

During the 1961 visit of U.S. President John F. Kennedy to Venezuela, anti-American violence also broke out; a repeat of the 1958 attack was avoided, however. President Betancourt pre-deployed significant Venezuelan military forces into Caracas in advance of Kennedy's arrival and ordered the preventive arrest of suspected ringleaders. All 16 kilometres (9.9 mi) of the highway Kennedy was scheduled to travel from the airport, the same highway traveled by Nixon, were closed effective the day before Kennedy's arrival.

== Significance ==
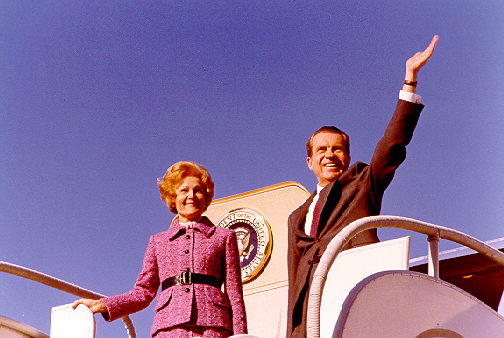
Nixon, pictured here 14 years after the attack, was deeply affected by his experiences in Caracas

Pathé News described the assault as "the most violent attack ever perpetrated on a high American official while on foreign soil". Contemporary and later sources described the attack as one that nearly led to Nixon's death and, though it is generally agreed he acted with remarkable composure throughout, the incident had a lasting impact on him. In his first book, Six Crises, Nixon wrote of the experience as one of the titular crises with great impact on his life.

Every year on the anniversary of the attack, Nixon would "privately celebrate" with Vernon Walters. Nixon would favor Walters for the rest of his career, eventually appointing him Deputy Director of Central Intelligence. On the eve of Walters' retirement from government service, in 1991, Nixon explained his longtime patronage of the general, writing him that "you and I have faced death together and that gives us a special bond".

The hardening of Nixon's attitude toward Latin America, which he came to "equate with violence and irrationality", has been attributed to his experience of the attack. Some believe this change of mood foreshadowed his subsequent support for covert U.S. actions directed in support of dictatorial regimes in the region. In fact, he would later privately list several nations whose populations, he believed, were too immature for democratic government and would be better administered by authoritarian regimes, specifically citing France, Italy, and all of Latin America "except for Colombia".

The incident has been credited with first making American policymakers aware of growing popular resentment to U.S. policies in Latin America. By the end of 1958, the U.S. National Security Council would list "yankeephobia" as a key challenge to U.S. interests in Latin America.

== In literature ==
The attack on Richard Nixon's motorcade is extensively referenced in Paul Auster's novel 4 3 2 1. The book's protagonist, a school boy in 1958, hears of the incident and talks about it with a politically radical uncle. Afterwards, he writes an article for his school newspaper entitled "Fracas in Caracas", where he states that the attack on Nixon resulted from Latin Americans' resentment of their domination and exploitation by the United States. This nearly leads to his being expelled by an angry school principal, accusing him of being "a youthful Communist agitator".

== See also ==
- Eva Perón's "Rainbow Tour" – another event in which a major political official was attacked by a mob while visiting a foreign country on official business
- Military dictatorship in Venezuela
