= Hebron University =

University in Hebron, West Bank, Palestine

Coordinates: 31°33′00″N 35°05′34″E

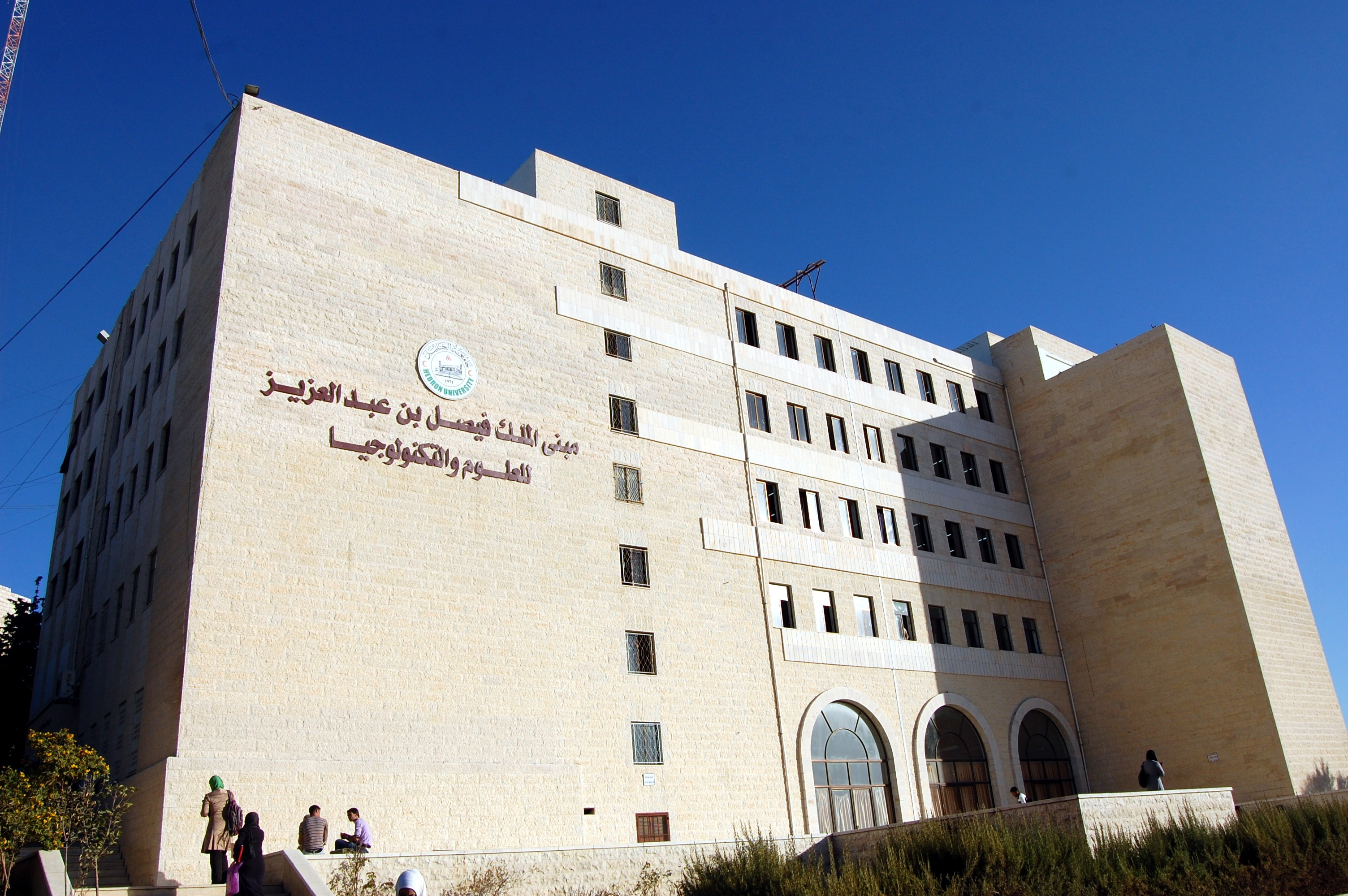
- The science and technology building on the univerisity campus, 2010
- Type: Public, a profit independent university
- Established: 1971; 55 years ago
- President: Dr. Salah Alzaroo
- Academic staff: 170 Full time academics
- Undergraduates: 10,611
- Postgraduates: 379
- Location: Hebron, West Bank, Palestine
- Campus: Hebron City, Zif near Yatta, Dura (all in Hebron Governorate)
- Website: www.hebron.edu

Hebron University (Arabic: جامعة الخليل) is a non-profit, public university in the city of Hebron, West Bank, Palestine. It has an undergraduate enrollment of more than 10,000 students.

== History ==
The late mayor of Hebron, Sheikh Mohammad ‘Ali Al-Ja’bari, wished to establish an institution of higher learning to offset restrictions and obstacles created by the occupation by Israel. In 1971, the foundation was laid and forty-three students joined the 'Sharia' college from different parts of the Palestinian Territories.

in 1983, the campus was attacked by Israeli settlers, resulting in the deaths of three students and injury of 50 students. After the attack, the university was temporarily closed by the newly formed Israeli Civil Administration.

During the First Intifada the Israeli Defense Forces (IDF) closed the university from January 1988 to June 1991.

In 1996, Hebron University was closed for six months by the IDF. The chairman of the university accompanied by teaching faculty conducted classes on the pavement outside the university walls in objection to the closure and repeated closure orders by the IDF.

Eventually, the college became a university. As of 2016, there are nine undergraduate colleges and one college of graduate studies.

== Board of trustees ==
Hebron University is governed by an autonomous Board of Trustees composed of educators and professionals from the Palestinian community. The board appoints the president of the university. It also confirms the appointment of vice-presidents and deans upon the recommendation of the president. The board approves the budget and general development plans presented to it by the university council.

== Administration and policies ==
The university follows a semester system, with two four-month semesters beginning in Autumn and Spring as well as an intensive summer semester.

For the academic year 2015–2016, more than 1,500 students were admitted at the undergraduate level.

The university has a registration policy open to students from every segment of Palestinian society. Requirements to apply to study are to have the Tawjihi (matriculation certificate) or its equivalent. It has a special financial aid program that provides grants and loans to needy students.

The university is a member of the following organizations: International Association of Universities, Community of Mediterranean Universities, Islamic Universities League, and Association of Arab Universities (AARU). In addition, the university is recognized by the European Union and has a valid PADOR and PIC number.

== Faculties and programs ==
The undergraduate colleges at Hebron University are: Arts, Medicine, Science and Technology, Agriculture, Education, Finance and Management, Nursing, Pharmacy, Law & Political Science. All faculties offer Bachelor of Arts, Bachelor of Science, or Doctor of Medicine degrees.

The College of Graduate Studies offers Master of Arts and Master of Science degrees in Arabic Language and Literature, Applied Linguistics & Teaching English Language, History, Islamic Judiciary, Plant Protection, Natural Agriculture Resources & its Sustainable Management, Management, Foundations of Religion, Mathematics, and Chemistry.

As of 2015 there were 170 full-time faculty members, including 105 who hold Ph.D. degrees. There are nine colleges at Hebron University: Islamic Law (Al-Shari`a), Arts, Science and Technology, Agriculture, Education, Finance and Management, Nursing, and Pharmacy and Graduate Studies. All colleges offer B.A. or B.Sc. degrees. The Faculty of Graduate Studies offers M.A. and M.Sc. degrees in eight programs: Arabic language and literature, Islamic judiciary, Plant Protection, Natural Agricultural Resources and their Sustainable Management, Business Administration MBA, Applied Linguistics and the Teaching of English Language, History, and Fundamentals of Islamic Law.

Since 2008, HU has been running an Intensive academic program for undergraduate Palestinians with Israeli citizenship.

== Centers and special units ==
HU has many units dedicated to improving education, training and services; these include the Renewable energy unit, Excellence center for education, Industrial linkage unit, Agricultural extension unit, Dry land rehabilitation unit, and the Language resource centre.

The Legal Clinic offers resources and advice for students, staff and the community as a whole.

== Facilities ==
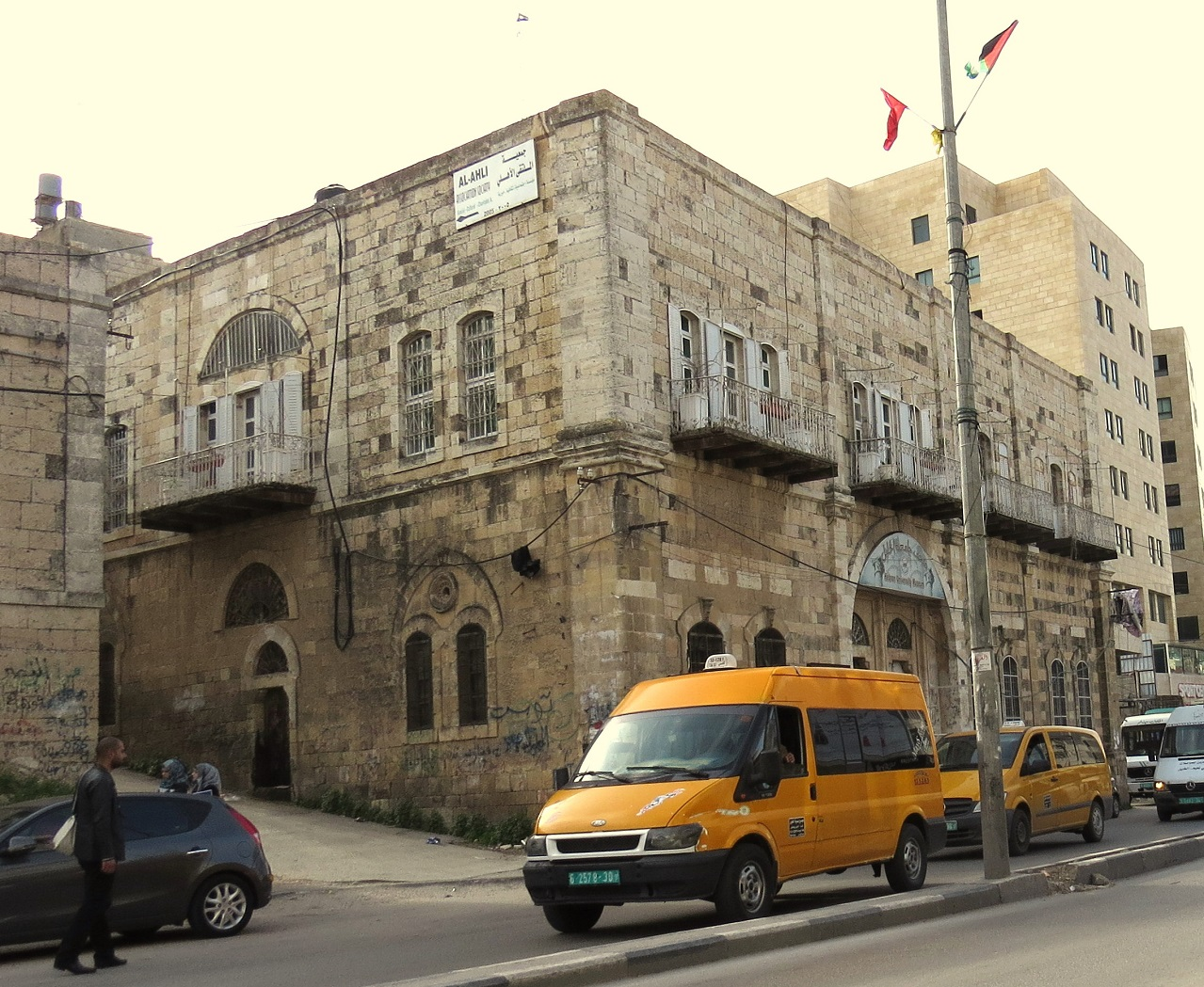
Hebron University Museum

There is a Hebron University Museum of Antiquities located in Hebron City.

== University radio ==
In 2008, Radio Alam was established as a tool to reach the university community and the public with important educational messages, current affairs shows, and other programmes on 96.1 FM. It broadcasts constantly online and across Hebron Governorate. It is staffed by professionals, and students are able to do internships in the studios.

== See also ==
- List of universities and colleges in Palestine
- Education in Palestine
- List of museums in Palestine
- Muhammad Rashad al-Sharif
