= Bet Lahem Live Festival =

Festival in Bethlehem, West Bank, Palestine

Bet Lahem Live is a 4-day long annual cultural festival in Bethlehem, West Bank, Palestine, first celebrated in the summer of 2013. As of 2019, Bet Lahem Live attracted over 25,000 local and international guests to Bethlehem for arts, music, food, and group workshops. The festival is put on by the Holy Land Trust, a Palestinian non-profit organization based in Bethlehem.

The festival started as a way to revitalize Star Street in the Old City of Bethlehem, one of Bethlehem's oldest commercial streets, and a traditional pilgrimage route for Christians. After the Second Intifada in 2001, there was a sharp decline in tourism and business in Bethlehem, which forced many of the shops on the street to close. Sami Awad, founder of the Holy Land Trust which is also based on Star Street, used the festival to bring international tourism to Bethlehem, and many shops set up on the street specifically for the festival.

A number of international artists have taken part in the festival, including Marcus Mumford and Winston Marshall of Mumford & Sons, Beth Rowley, and Kal Lavelle.
