= Life imprisonment in Israel =

Life imprisonment in Israel is legal and the most severe punishment available under Israeli law during peacetime.

== Overview ==
The death penalty is applicable for certain crimes in Israel, but has only been used twice, once illegally during the 1948 Palestine war, and once legally against Adolf Eichmann in 1962, with another four convictions in cases of political violence being commuted or overruled on appeal. Life imprisonment is the maximum penalty in cases of murder, and mandatory for aggravated murder. Life imprisonment is also used in cases of terrorism, as well as kidnapping and attempted murder. Israeli law also allows life sentences for juveniles under age 18 if convicted of murder. Israel is one of the few countries that allows this.

As a matter of tradition, the President reduces most life sentences to a determinate sentence, usually within the range of 20-30 years, with parole eligibility after two-thirds of that sentence is served. Those convicted of terrorist offenses are not typically granted clemency or parole, and are usually only released in prisoner exchanges.
