= Charles Lichenstein =

American diplomat (1926–2002)

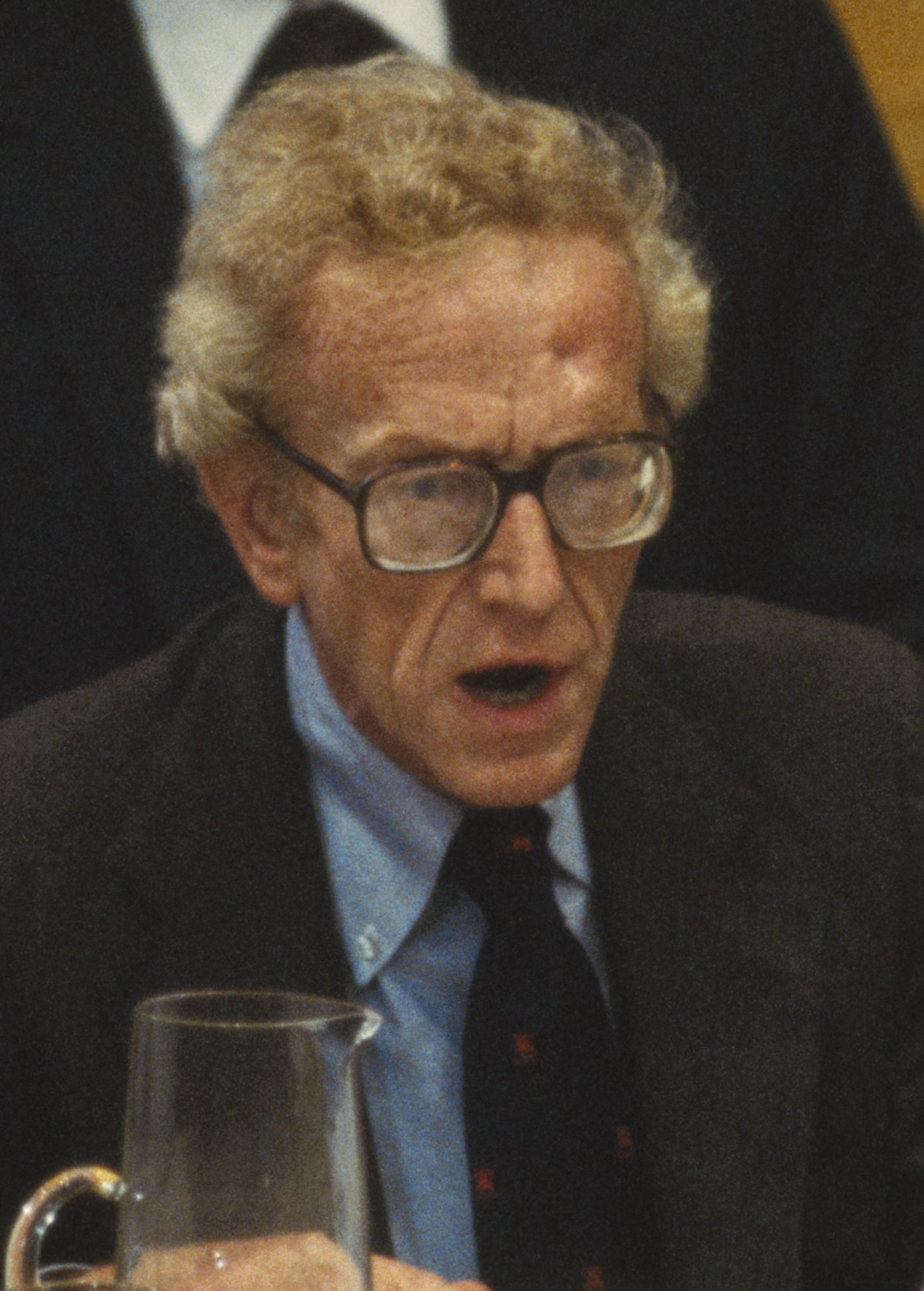
- Lichenstein in 1983
- Born: 20 September 1926; Albany, New York, U.S.
- Died: 22 August 2002 (aged 75); Washington D.C., U.S.
- Occupation: Diplomat

Charles Mark Lichenstein (September 20, 1926 – August 22, 2002) was the American alternate representative for special political affairs to the United Nations, the second-highest ranking American diplomat at the United Nations, from 1981 to 1984. Lichenstein is best remembered for controversial comments that he made welcoming the possibility of relocating the United Nations headquarters outside of the United States.

== Early life ==
Lichenstein was born on 1926 in Albany, New York.

== Career ==
He graduated from Yale University with undergraduate and graduate degrees, and later taught pollical science at Yale. He also was a faculty member at Notre Dame and Albertus Magnus Colleges.

In the 1960s, Lichenstein worked in the presidential campaigns of Richard Nixon and Barry Goldwater. In 1962, he was head of research at the Republican National Committee.

=== Nixon administration ===
Lichenstein was the primary ghostwriter for Richard Nixon's book Six Crises, published in 1962. Lichenstein was staff assistant to Robert Finch during the Nixon administration, and an assistant to Dean Burch during the Ford administration.

=== PBS ===
From 1975 to 1979, Lichenstein was senior vice president of PBS.

=== United Nations ===
In 1981, Lichenstein was appointed by Ronald Reagan as the American alternate representative for special political affairs to the United Nations, serving as a deputy to America's chief U.N Ambassador Jeane Kirkpatrick.

After the Soviet Union shot down Korean Air Lines Flight 007 on September 1, 1983, New York and New Jersey both denied Soviet aircraft permission to land at airports in either state in violation of the United Nations Charter, which requires the United Nations' host nation to allow all member countries access to the U.N. Lichenstein responded, saying,

The United States [Federal Government], which opposed the [New York and New Jersey] legislation, offered the Soviet Union landing rights at a military base so its foreign minister, Andrei A. Gromyko, could fly in for the General Assembly meeting although the Soviets refused. When the United Nations committee met to review the situation, the Soviet delegate, Igor I. Yakovlev, said the ban on landing "raises the question of whether the United Nations should be in the United States." A furious Mr. Lichenstein replied that if member states felt "they are not being treated with the hostly consideration that is their due," they should consider "removing themselves and this organization from the soil of the United States. We will put no impediment in your way," he continued, "The members of the U.S. mission to the United Nations will be down at the dockside waving you a fond farewell as you sail off into the sunset."

Following opposition to Lichenstein's remarks by the U.S. State Department, Lichenstein offered his resignation, but it was not accepted. President Reagan instead responded with this statement that endorsed Lichenstein's controversial remarks:

Maybe all those delegates should have six months in Moscow and then six months in New York, and it would give them an opportunity to see two ways of life. I think the gentleman [Charles Lichenstein] who spoke the other day had the hearty approval of most people in America in his suggestion that we weren’t asking anyone to leave, but if they chose to leave, good-bye.

=== The Heritage Foundation ===
Lichenstein left his position at the United Nations in 1984 to become a distinguished fellow at The Heritage Foundation, where he remained a strong critic of the United Nations and a proponent of UN reform. He also served on several committees focused on improving efficiency and effectiveness at the UN. In 1995, Lichenstein told the Associated Press: "The original purpose of the United Nations was the fanciful hope that you could deter conflicts, and sometimes, if that failed, you could bring them to a conclusion. It was a hope, a dream, for which the basis never existed in 1945 or 1995 or anywhere in between."

Lichenstein was a distinguished fellow at The Heritage Foundation until his death on August 22, 2002.
