= Al-Qarara =

- Municipality type B

Arabic transcription(s)
  - Arabic: القرارة
  - Latin: al-Qrara (official) el-Qarara (unofficial)
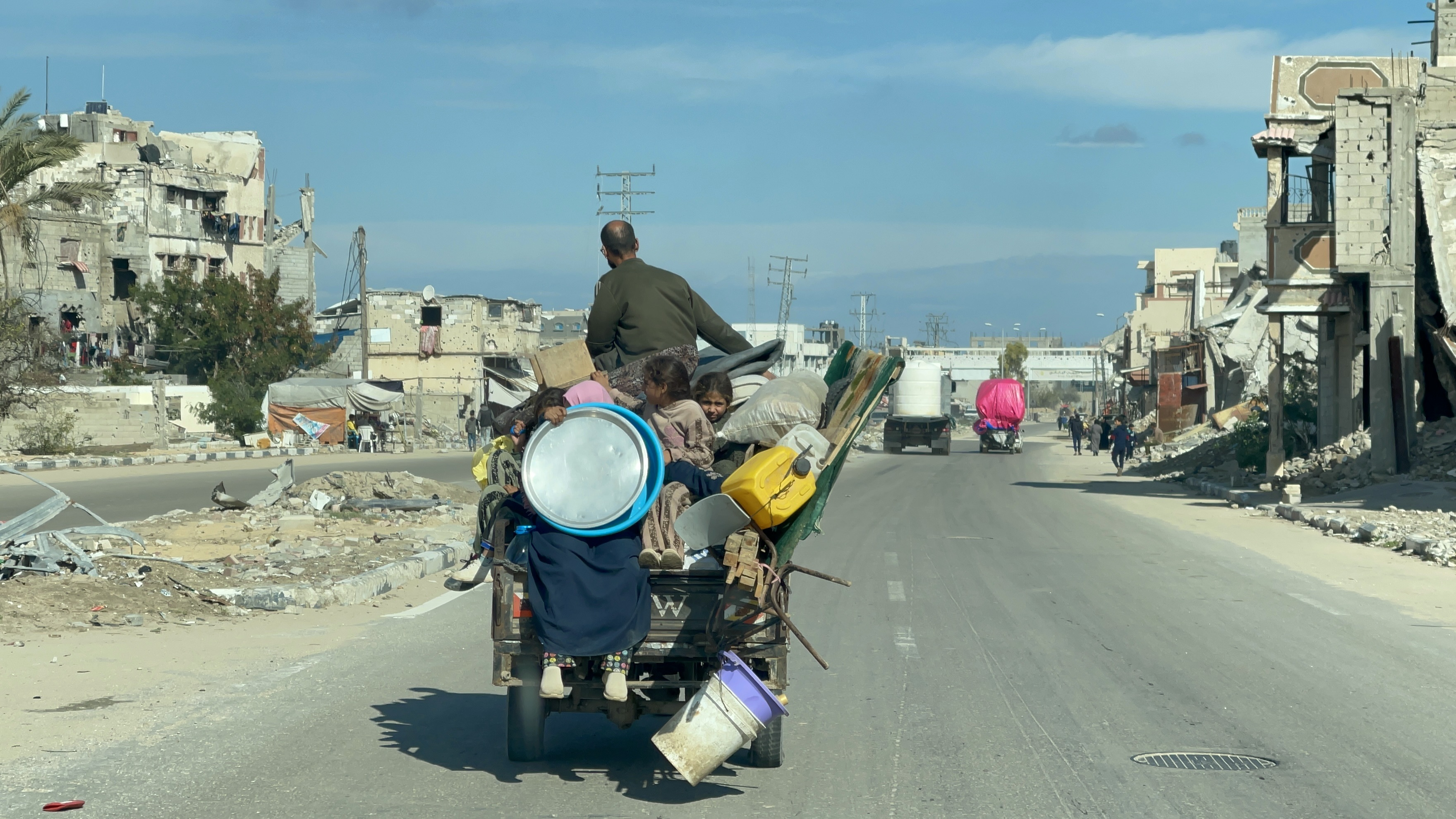
- Salah al-Din Road through al-Qarara in 2025

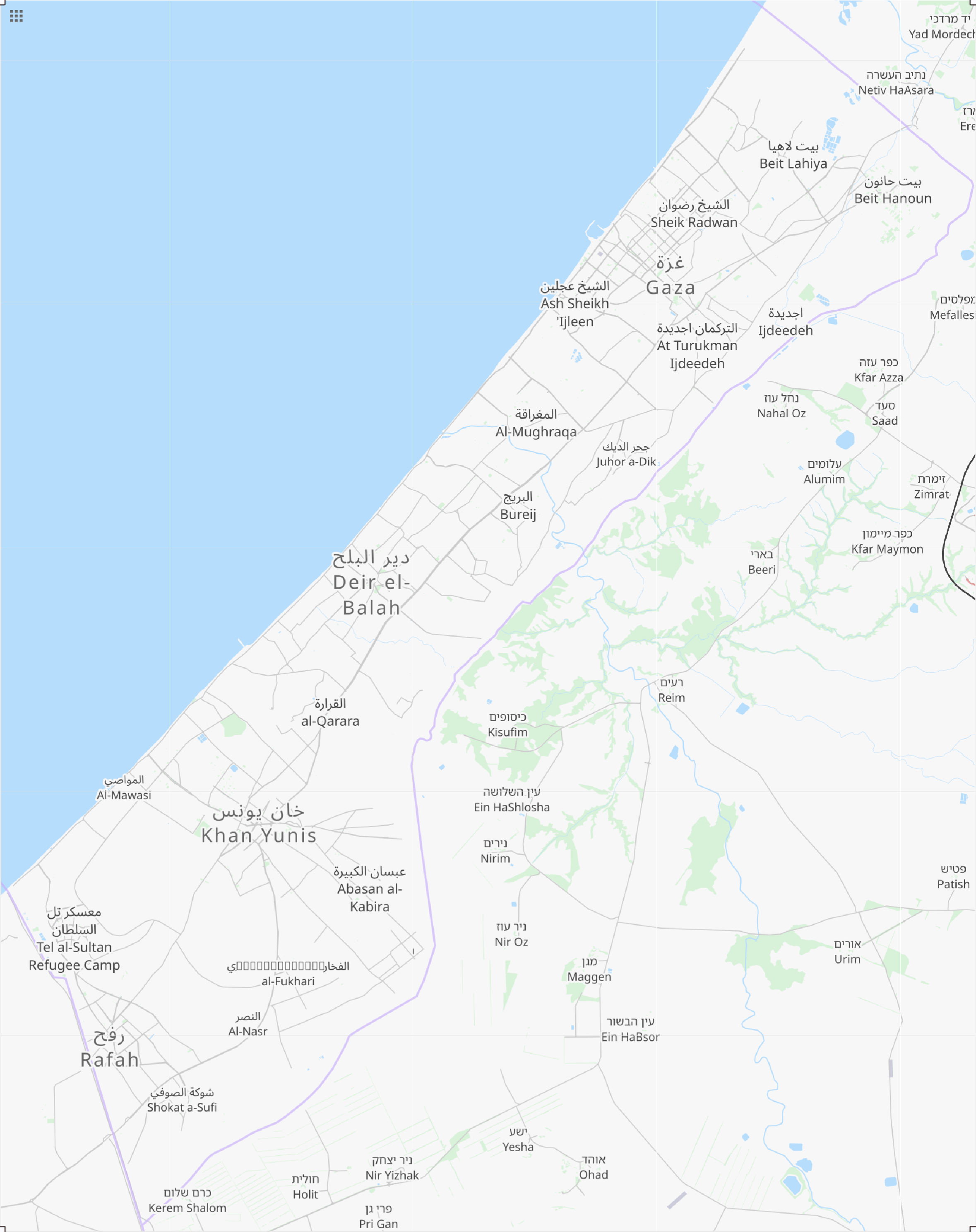
- Location within Gaza Strip Location within State of Palestine
- Coordinates: 31°22′23″N 34°20′21″E
- State: State of Palestine
- Governorate: Khan Yunis

Government
  - Type: Municipality
  - Control: Israel
  - Head of Municipality: Eid al-Abdullah

Population (2017)
  - Total: 29,004

Al-Qarara (Arabic: القرارة) is a Palestinian town in the Khan Yunis Governorate of the Gaza Strip. It is located just north of Khan Yunis and approximately 24 kilometres (15 mi) south of Gaza City. According to the Palestinian Central Bureau of Statistics, the town had a population of 29,004 people in 2017.

Two months after the beginning of the Gaza war in 2023, al-Qarara was besieged for four months by the Israel Defense Forces. During this time, numerous residential buildings in the town were destroyed, and the town became the site of a displacement camp.

== History ==
Al-Qarara, which used to be a farming village, lies on trade routes dating back to the Bronze Age. The town was home to the al-Qarara Cultural Museum, which housed several Canaanite and Roman artifacts. Construction on a pedestrian bridge over Salah al-Din Road, funded by Japan, was completed in the town in September 2023.

== Gaza war ==
In December 2023, two months into the Gaza war, Israel issued evacuation orders to the inhabitants of al-Qarara, and initiated a siege of the town shortly thereafter. During and after the siege, much of the town's infrastructure was destroyed.

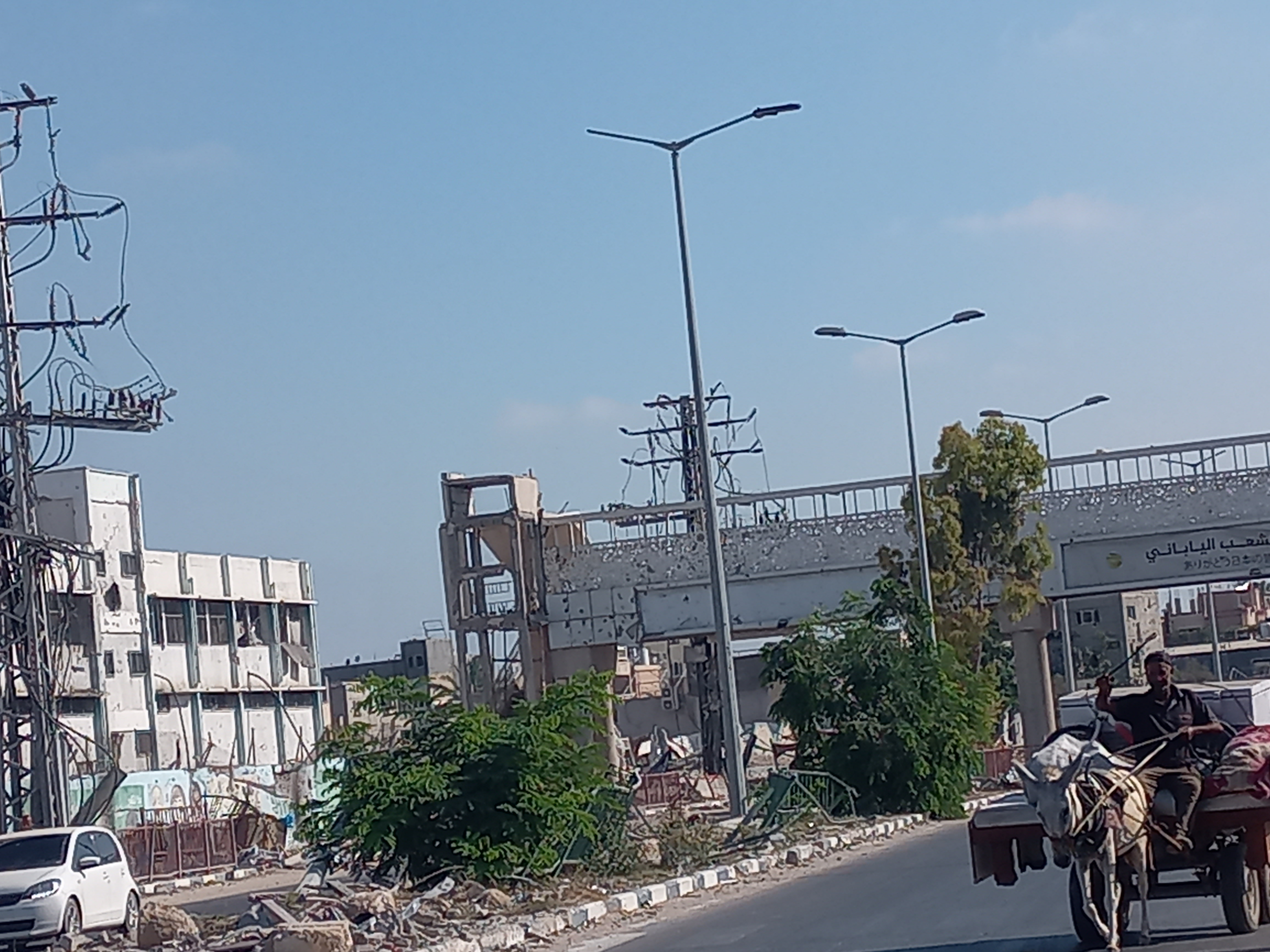
This photo depicts Al-Qarara's pedestrian bridge over Salah Aldin Street. On the left side of the photo, an UNRWA school. On the street, a donkey cart which became the main mean of transportation in Gaza after start of Gaza war

By 12 December of that year, al-Qarara was completely encircled by Israeli troops, who also engaged a number of other towns in the area, such as Absan, Al-Nazla, Bani Suheila, and al-Satr.

== See also ==
- Israeli bombing of the Gaza Strip
