= Al Qarara Cultural Museum =

Archaeological museum in Khan Yunis, Gaza Strip, Palestine

- متحف القرارة الثقافي
- Established: 2016
- Dissolved: October 2023
- Coordinates: 31°22′07″N 34°20′31″E
- Type: Archaeology museum
- Collections: Archaeology, history
- Collection size: 3500
- Director: Mohamed Abu Lahia

The Al Qarara Cultural Museum (Arabic: متحف القرارة الثقافي) was a museum in al-Qarara, near Khan Yunis, in the Gaza Strip, Palestine. Founded in 2016, the museum featured the archaeology and history of the area, collected by its founders and by local community members. It was destroyed by Israeli forces in October 2023 during the Gaza war.

== Background ==
The museum was founded in 2016 in Al Qarara, a village close to Khan Yunis in the southern Gaza Strip, by six people, including museum director Mohamed Abu Lahia and his wife Najla Abu Lahia. Mohamed became interested in local archaeology from childhood, whilst Najla studied archaeology and art at Gaza University.

The Palestinian Ministry of Tourism and Antiquities granted the museum, housed in a former grain silo, a private licence. It was the second museum, and the first private museum, to be established in the area. The museum was designed to educate people about Palestinian cultural heritage, to strengthen their sense of identity.

== Collections ==
The museum contained over 3500 archaeological, historical and numismatic objects from the Gaza region. The objects dated from 4000 BC to the present-day, many of which were collected or donated by local community members. Key objects included Byzantine mosaics, swords dating to the Crusader period, thobes, as well as jewellery worn by women prior to the Nakba. It also included military items dating to the British Mandate in Palestine. In 2021 the museum celebrated the National Day of Palestinian Heritage.

Each item was documented and then numbered before being displayed at the museum. Documentation of items is a very difficult process. I decided to start a museum to preserve the history and the heritage of Palestine. People visit the museum to learn more about their history and heritage.

— Najla Abu Lahia, Najla Abu Lahia starts cultural museum in Gaza by collecting more than 3,000 artifacts, Jinha Women's News Agency

== Destruction ==
The museum and its collection were damaged in October 2023 by Israeli forces via an airstrike just outside the Museum. The museum's structure, display cases, and collection were damaged. The Arab Organization of Museums (ICOM-Arab) later confirmed the museum was completely destroyed after Israel issued a warning to evacuate its collection to the south of Gaza. Reports indicated that the initial airstrike caused substantial damage, with accounts noting that only remnants such as shards of pottery and smashed glass remained at the site.

In 2025, a group called the Heritage Guardians Team was formed by volunteers to retrieve artifacts from beneath the rubble. In December 2025, Mohammad abu Lahia told TRT World that the team recovered 1,000 of the 3,500 artifacts in the museum using manual labor, as heavy duty excavation equipment was not available.

== Awards ==
- ICCROM Sharjah Award for Reviving Cultural Heritage (2022)

== See also ==
- List of museums in the State of Palestine
- Destruction of cultural heritage during the Gaza war
- Outline of the Gaza war
- Central Archives of Gaza City
