= Star Street =

Street in Bethlehem, West Bank, Palestine

Coordinates: 31°42′22″N 35°12′14″E

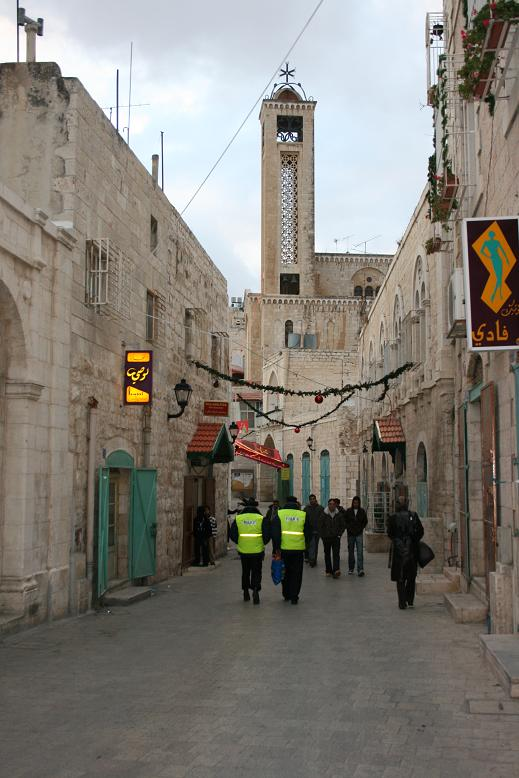
View of a part of Star Street on Christmas Eve 2008

Star Street (Arabic: شارع النجمة) is a street in Bethlehem, West Bank, Palestine. It is one of the city's oldest commercial streets, connecting the northern part of the Old City to the southern part. Most of the buildings along Star Street were built in the 19th century. Prior to the Second Intifada in 2001, there were 98 shops on Star Street. Due to a sharp decline in tourism in Bethlehem because of the violence, nearly half were closed. However, in 2008, the number of shops increased to 63. Since June 2008, a "Thursday Market", a daylong celebration of business, commerce, and community, has been established to encourage business along the street.

== See also ==
- Manger Square
- Church of the Nativity
- Mosque of Omar (Jerusalem)
- Omar Mukhtar Street
- Bet Lahem Live Festival
