= Al-Badd Museum for Olive Oil Production =

Museum in Bethlehem, Palestine

Coordinates: 31°42′21.32″N 35°12′12.84″E

The al-Badd Museum for Olive Oil Production (Arabic: متحف البد), also known as Badd Giackaman Museum (Arabic: متحف بد جقمان), is a museum in the center of Bethlehem, Palestine, close to the Church of the Nativity. The museum houses several ethnographic and archaeological artifacts depicting the process of olive oil production. The exhibits demonstrate the use of olive oil for lamps, medicine, food, soap, cosmetics, etc.

== History ==
The building in which the museum was built dates from the late 18th century. Between 1998 and 2000, the museum was restored by the Department of Antiquities of the State of Palestine, in coordination with the UNDP, the Greek Orthodox Society, and the Japanese Government.

In April 2002, during the invasion and siege of the Church of the Nativity, Israeli forces stormed the museum. On May 25, 2006, Israeli forces stormed the site for a second time, destroying the museum's main gate and breaking into the museum; as a result, a number of antique pottery jars and flasks, and some office supplies, were destroyed.

The museum was restored again in 2014 with the help of the French Consulate of Jerusalem.

== Olive Oil Production ==
Badd is an Arabic word to describe the traditional press used in the production of olive oil. The press features flat rock placed which the olives were placed onto, crushed using another circular stone which is vertically mounted, rolling on top of them using its weight to press them into oil. The stone was rotated using a pair of donkeys. This method was used up until the 20th century, at which point it was replaced with modern machinery. This process is documented in the museum. The museum also contains other artifacts relating to olive oil production, such as crafts made from olive wood.

== See also ==
- List of museums in Palestine
