= Republic of Venezuela =

Venezuela from 1953 to 1999

Republic of Venezuela República de Venezuela (Spanish)
- 1953–1999
- Flag Coat of arms
- Motto: "Dios y Federación" (Spanish)
- Anthem: "Gloria al Bravo Pueblo"
- Capital and largest city: Caracas
- Official languages: Spanish
- Religion: Around 92% Roman Catholic (Secular state)
- Demonym: Venezuelan
- Government: Military dictatorship (1953–1958); Federal presidential constitutional republic (1958–1999)
- President
  - 1953–1958: Marcos Pérez Jiménez (first)
  - 1958: Wolfgang Larrázabal
  - 1958–1959: Édgar Sanabria
  - 1959–1964: Rómulo Betancourt
  - 1964–1969: Raúl Leoni
  - 1969–1974: Rafael Caldera
  - 1974–1979: Carlos Andrés Pérez
  - 1979–1984: Luis Herrera Campíns
  - 1984–1989: Jaime Lusinchi
  - 1989–1993: Carlos Andrés Pérez
  - 1993: Octavio Lepage
  - 1993–1994: Ramón Velásquez
  - 1994–1999: Rafael Caldera
  - 1999: Hugo Chávez (last) (from February to December)
- Legislature: Congress
  - Upper house: Senate
  - Lower house: Chamber of Deputies
- Historical era: Cold War • Bolivarian Revolution
  - Established: 11 April 1953
  - Constitution adopted: 16 January 1961
  - Chávez inaugurated: 2 February 1999
  - Informally dissolved: 30 December 1999

Population
  - 1995 estimate: 22,189,000
- HDI (1999): 0.674 medium
- Currency: Bolívar
- ISO 3166 code: VE
Preceded by	Succeeded by
United States of Venezuela	Bolivarian Republic of Venezuela

The Republic of Venezuela was a democratic bipartidist republic first established in 1953, and replaced in 1999 by the Bolivarian Republic of Venezuela. Venezuela was ruled by a military dictatorship from 1948 to 1958. After the 1948 Venezuelan coup d'état brought an end to a three-year experiment in democracy, a triumvirate of military personnel controlled the government until 1952, when it held presidential elections. These were free enough to produce results unacceptable to the government, leading them to be falsified and to one of the three leaders, Marcos Pérez Jiménez, assuming the Presidency. His government was brought to an end by the 1958 Venezuelan coup d'état, which saw the advent of democracy with a transitional government under Admiral Wolfgang Larrazábal in place until the December 1958 elections. Prior to the elections, three of the main political parties, Acción Democrática, COPEI and Unión Republicana Democrática, with the notable exclusion of the Communist Party of Venezuela, signed up to the Puntofijo Pact power-sharing agreement. This period is pejoratively known as the "Adeco" period.

This period was characterised by the alternation of political power established in the Punto Fijo Pact; by the nationalisation of the oil industry in 1976 and the creation of PDVSA, the national oil and gas company; and by the rise of new social elites. Internationally, Venezuela became a founding member of the Organization of the Petroleum Exporting Countries (OPEC). The 1980s in particular were characterised by the flowering of art and culture and by the artistic development of the nation, especially in television. Pioneering media like RCTV made Venezuela famous with soap operas such as Kassandra.

== Name ==
The period following the dissolution of Gran Colombia in 1830 (and thus succeeding the Third Republic of Venezuela) to the establishment of a "Bolivarian Republic" by Hugo Chávez on August 5, 1999, is referred to as the Fourth Republic of Venezuela by official Venezuelan historiography. The term was coined by Chávez to define the 169-year period.

The term is not universally accepted by Venezuelan historians, however, as Elías Pino Iturrieta argues that no "Fifth Republic" was founded in 1999, while Diego Bautista Urbaneja proposes a different chronology for the entirety of Venezuela's republican history: a "First Republic" from 1830 to 1857, a "Second Republic" from 1870 to 1899, a "Third Republic" from 1909 to 1945, a "Fourth Republic" from 1958 to 1999 and a "Fifth Republic" from 1999 to 2013, ending with the death of Hugo Chávez (and thus suggesting a "Sixth Republic" under Nicolás Maduro).

== History ==
=== Betancourt administration (1959–1964) ===
After a military coup d'état on 23 January 1958 sent General Marcos Pérez Jiménez into exile, Venezuela's three main political parties signed the Punto Fijo Pact. The ensuing elections brought Acción Democrática, which had been the ruling party from 1945 to 1948, back to power under its leader Rómulo Betancourt. Betancourt's government halted grants to multinational oil companies, created a Venezuelan oil corporation, and helped establish OPEC in 1960, an initiative led by Development Minister Juan Pablo Pérez Alfonso. The administration also introduced a new constitution in 1961, dividing the government into executive, legislative, and judicial branches; pursued agricultural reform; and promoted an international doctrine in which Venezuela only recognised governments elected by popular vote.

The new order had its opponents. On 24 June 1960, Betancourt was injured in an assassination attempt led by the Dominican dictator Rafael Leónidas Trujillo. Around the same time, the left-wingers excluded from the Punto Fijo Pact (Revolutionary Left Movement and Armed Forces of National Liberation) began an insurgency that was backed by the Communist Party of Cuba and its leader, Fidel Castro.

=== Leoni and first Caldera term (1964–1974) ===
In 1963, Raúl Leoni was elected to succeed Betancourt as president. Leoni's government became known for public works and cultural development, but was confronted with continuous guerrilla warfare.

Rafael Caldera won the next election. Before he took office in 1969, the Rupununi Uprising broke out in neighboring Guyana. The border controversy was resolved with the Port of Spain Protocol in 1970. Additionally, a truce with the guerrillas allowed their reintegration into political life.

=== First Carlos Andrés Pérez term (1974–1979) ===
Carlos Andrés Pérez took office in 1974, amid an oil crisis that had begun the previous year and had increased the global price of oil from $3 per barrel to nearly $12 per barrel. Venezuela nationalised its iron industry in 1975 and its oil industry the following year.

=== Herrera Campins and Lusinchi administrations (1979–1989) ===
Luis Herrera Campins was elected to the presidency in 1979, with the country in deep debt and bound by International Monetary Fund demands. In 1983, the Venezuelan currency, the bolívar, was devalued on what became known as Black Friday, unleashing an economic crisis. The subsequent government of Jaime Lusinchi did little to counter the crisis. Corruption increased, and the Caldas Corvettes crisis in 1987, sparked by a sovereignty dispute in the Gulf of Venezuela, generated one of the biggest moments of tension between Venezuela and Colombia.

=== Second Carlos Andrés Pérez term (1989–1993) ===
Pérez was elected again in 1988 and, looking to solve the recession, adopted economic measures that set off major protests, the biggest of which was the Caracazo wave of 1989. The same year, Venezuela held its first direct elections of governors and regional mayors.

In February and November 1992, Hugo Chávez led two coup d'état attempts, and in 1993, Congress ousted Pérez. Octavio Lepage served as acting president for about two weeks, at which point the historian and parliamentarian Ramón José Velásquez took over the interim role.

Despite initially rejecting liberalization policies, his economic agenda was later focused on cutting subsidies, privatizations, and legislation to attract foreign investment. Naím began at the lowest rung of economic liberalization, which was freeing controls on prices and a ten percent increase in that of gasoline, which in Venezuela is sacrosantly very low. The increase in petrol price fed into a 30 percent increase in fares for public transport In February 1989, barely into his second term, Pérez faced a series of widespread protests and lootings, which started in Guarenas and later spread to Caracas, known as El Caracazo. The response resulted in the declaration of a state of emergency and led to a large number of deaths, ranging from the official estimate of 277 dead to over 2000.

==== 1992 coup d'état attempts ====
The MBR-200 officers started plotting seriously and on 4 February 1992 they struck. Hugo Chávez was a lieutenant-colonel, but other generals were also involved in the coup attempt. The plan involved members of the military overwhelming military locations and communication installations and then establishing Rafael Caldera in power once Perez was captured and assassinated. They almost had him cornered in the presidential palace, but he managed to escape to the presidential residence and from there, loyal troops cornerered Chávez and arrested him. In exchange for prompting his co-conspirators to lay down their arms, Chávez, fully uniformed and unbowed, was allowed to speak on television to the entire nation in a moment that granted him a place on the nation's political stage. On 27 November 1992, higher-ranked officers tried to overthrow Pérez but the conspiracy was easily put down.

==== Impeachment and transition ====
Pérez's downfall came when a legal process was begun to force to him reveal how he had used a secret but legal presidential fund, which he resolutely resisted. With the Supreme Court and Congress ranged against him, Pérez was imprisoned, for a while in a detention center, and then under house arrest. He handed the presidency in 1993 to Ramón J. Velásquez, a politician from his party and historian who had been his presidential secretary. Velázquez oversaw the elections of 1993.

=== Second Caldera administration (1994–1999) ===
Rafael Caldera campaigned for the presidency and brand-new political movement, called Convergencia. The adecos chose the pardo Claudio Fermín. Petkoff had seen the futility of trying again and backed Caldera. Abstentions reached a record of 40%.

Caldera assumed the presidency for the second time in 1994 and had to confront the Venezuelan banking crisis of 1994. He reimposed exchange controls, which Pérez's administration had lifted as part of a general financial liberalisation (unaccompanied by effective regulation, which contributed to the banking crisis). The economy had suffered under the falling oil price, which led to a collapse in government revenues. The steel corporation SIDOR was privatized, and the economy continued to plummet. Fulfilling an election promise, Caldera released Chávez and pardoned all the military and civilian conspirators during the Pérez administration. The economic crisis continued, and by the 1998 presidential election the traditional political parties had become unpopular; an initial front-runner for the presidency in late 1997 was Irene Sáez. Hugo Chávez gained popularity amid the financial turmoil and was elected president in 1998. His administration promoted a new constitution, which was approved by referendum in December 1999. The adoption of the new constitution in 1999 ended the bipartisanship, establishing the Bolivarian Republic of Venezuela.

== Territorial organisation ==
The constitution of 1961 divided Venezuela into states, a capital district, federal territories, and federal dependencies. Over the years, some territories have been elevated to the status of states, including Delta Amacuro in 1991 and Amazonas in 1992. Each state has a governor and a legislative assembly.

== Science and technology ==
Significant advances in the medical sciences took place during the Punto Fijo pact period. Jacinto Convit developed vaccines against leprosy and leishmaniasis, and Baruj Benacerraf was a co-recipient of the Nobel Prize in Physiology or Medicine in 1980 for his immunological research. In the field of technology, Humberto Fernández Morán invented the diamond knife and contributed to the development of the electron microscope.

== Culture ==
The 1980s and 1990s were also a golden age of television in Venezuela. A number of Venezuelan telenovelas became popular internationally: Leonela (1983), Cristal (1984), Abigail (1988), Kassandra (1992), and Por estas calles (1992), all from RCTV; and Las Amazonas (1985), Ka Ina (1995), and El país de las mujeres (1998) from Venevisión.

Several Venezuelans won international beauty contests: Maritza Sayalero (1979), Irene Sáez (1981), Bárbara Palacios Teyde (1986), and Alicia Machado (1996). Musicians like Franco de Vita, Ricardo Montaner, and Karina also became known on the international scene.

== Bibliography ==
- Rivero, Mirtha (2011). La rebelión de los náufragos (9th ed.). Alfa. ISBN 978-980-354-295-5.
