= Military dictatorship in Venezuela =

Period of military dictatorship

Venezuelan military dictatorship
- 1948–1958
Trienio Adeco	Interim government of Larrazábal
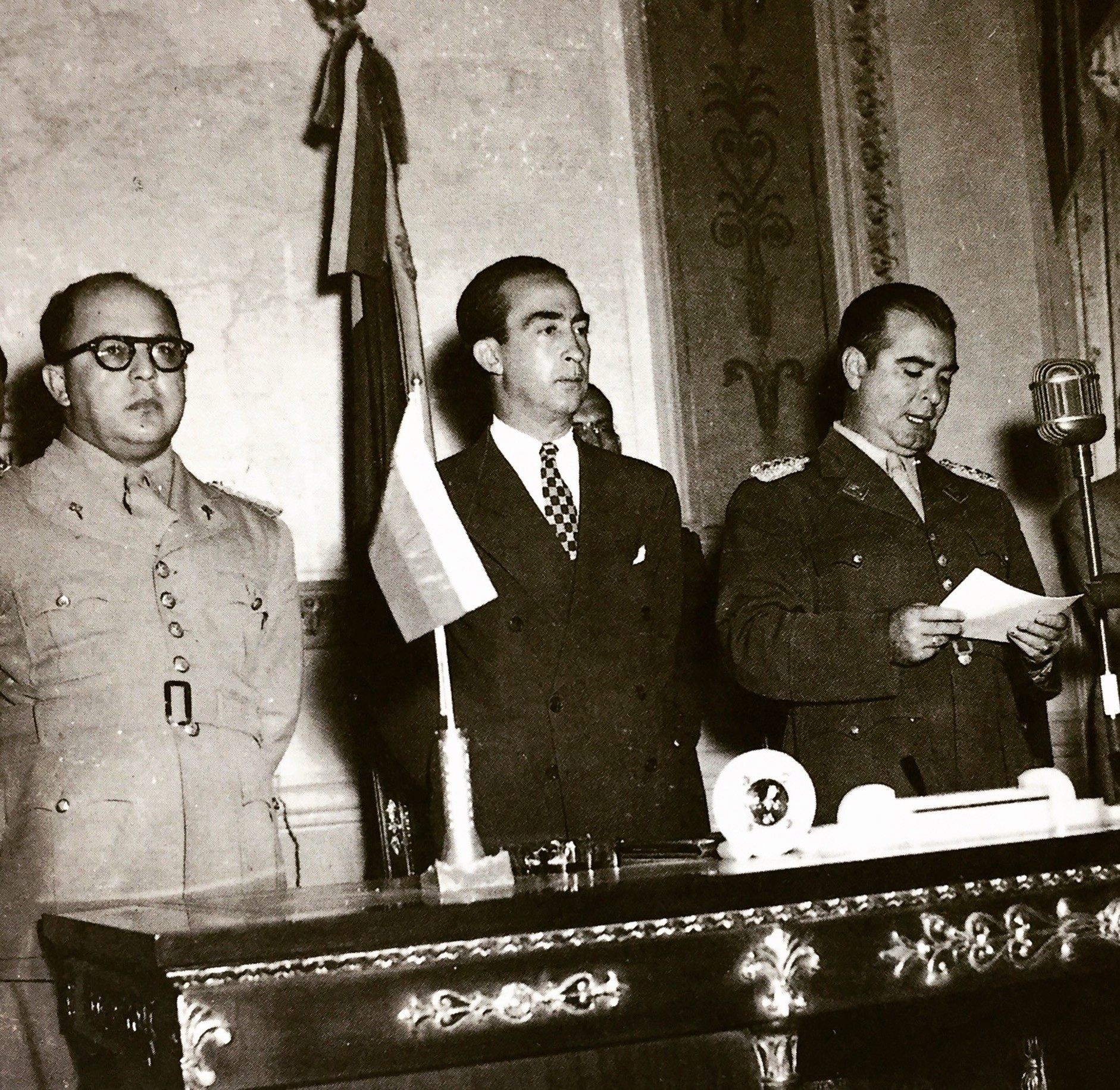
- Marcos Pérez Jiménez, Germán Suárez Flamerich, and Luis Llovera Páez, members of the junta in 1951
- Location: Venezuela
- Leaders: Carlos Delgado Chalbaud (1948-1950); Germán Suárez Flamerich (1950-1952); Marcos Pérez Jiménez (1952-1958)
- Key events: 1948 Venezuelan coup d'état (start); 1958 Venezuelan coup d'état (end)

A military dictatorship ruled Venezuela for ten years, from 1948 to 1958. After the 1948 Venezuelan coup d'état brought an end to a three-year experiment in democracy ("El Trienio Adeco"), a triumvirate of military personnel controlled the government until 1952, when it held presidential elections. These were free enough to produce results unacceptable to the government, leading them to be falsified, and to one of the three leaders, Marcos Pérez Jiménez, assuming the Presidency. His government was brought to an end by the 1958 Venezuelan coup d'état which saw the advent of democracy, with a transition government under Admiral Wolfgang Larrazábal in place until the December 1958 elections. Prior to the elections, three of the main political parties (with the notable exclusion of the Communist Party of Venezuela) signed up to the Punto Fijo Pact power-transition agreement.

== Background ==
El Trienio Adeco was a three-year period in Venezuelan history, from 1945 to 1948, under the government of the socialist Democratic Action party (Accion Democratica (AD), its adherents adecos). The party gained office via the 1945 Venezuelan coup d'état against President Isaías Medina Angarita, named "The October Revolution" on October 18, 1945, and held the first general elections in Venezuelan history. The 1947 Venezuelan general election saw Democratic Action formally elected to office, but it was removed from office shortly after in the 1948 Venezuelan coup d'état.

There was no particular incident that set off the bloodless 1948 coup, which was led by colonel Carlos Delgado Chalbaud. There was no popular opposition. This might have meant that the odds were too great or that the pardo masses had not noticed any particular improvement in their lives despite the incessant government propaganda. All prominent adecos were expelled. The other parties were allowed but muzzled.

== Delgado Chalbaud (1948–1950) ==
Venezuelan historians often say that Delgado Chalbaud was planning to restore Venezuelan democracy. If that was his intention, he did not get the chance to accomplish it. One day in November 1950, as he was being driven unescorted through a wooded part of Caracas towards the presidential palace, he was cut off by cars and kidnapped. His captors took him to an isolated house in southern Caracas. All versions of this incident are more or less agreed that someone's gun went off wounding the leader of the kidnappers, that Delgado Chalbaud was then hustled out of the car and he confronted his abductors, and that finally they shot him to death. The main kidnapper, his nephew Simon Urbina, who was bleeding badly, was soon captured and later, in the then official version, he was killed trying to flee. No one accepts this version, which is why it is widely believed that it was his political partner, Pérez Jiménez, who had Delgado Chalbaud assassinated, nevertheless some believe this is unlikely since the wife of Pérez Jiménez, Doña Flor María Chalbaud Cardona de Pérez Jiménez, was Delgado Chalbaud's cousin.

== Pérez Jiménez dictatorship (1950–1958) ==
Delgado Chalbaud had formed a triumvirate with Pérez Jiménez and Luis Felipe Llovera Páez. With his death, the remaining triumvirs chose a civilian president, Luis Germán Suárez Flamerich, who was dismissed by the military in 1952, and the ambitious Pérez Jiménez became dictator with the consent of Llovera Páez. The former majors, who had risen to colonels in the democracy, were now generals. Pérez Jiménez himself was physically not very impressive. He was short, balding, and tubby, and read speeches monotonously, although surely on the personal level he must have had some magnetism. He was a megalomaniac of much character that when a Time magazine interviewer asked him what Rome's greatest legacy was, he said, : "Its ruins", apparently wanting to give the impression that while the ruins of Rome were all that remained of its greatness, his own greatness will surpass them with his visionary building projects. In some ways, this is understandable. Pérez Jiménez, unlike most Venezuelans, received a thorough education from the military academies of Venezuela and Peru which he attended and graduated from with the highest honors.

By the time he came to power, Pérez Jiménez had developed a flair for fascist opulence, boasting about his projects aimed at making Venezuela the major power of South America. The greatest of Venezuelan writers at the time (and for a long time after that) was Arturo Uslar Pietri and he became famous on television with analytical biographies of great historical figures. Uslar Pietri had a felicitous phrase: "Sow the oil" ("Sembrar el petroleo" in Spanish), which became a national slogan meaning that the state's oil income should be productively invested. But in Venezuela "sowing the oil" implied "sowers" and the country did not have too many of these. In fact, it was the undeclared understanding that "sowing the oil" really meant "give Venezuelans employment by creating government jobs".

The other reason for Pérez Jiménez's "ruins revelation" was that what he intended to do as president, apart from becoming rich, which he did, like general Juan Vicente Gomez, with his own military and civilian cronies, was to build and build and build, and here too he was undeniably successful. It is only fair to point out here that while Gomez did become immensely rich, he never had a foreign bank account and even though Pérez Jiménez was not as rich as Gomez, all his money was sent to offshore accounts. Pérez Jiménez also had an efficient secret police, but the stories about tortures and killings were, like those about Gomez, mainly inventions by the frustrated adecos, although whoever in Venezuela tried to be active clandestinely was sure to be either imprisoned or shot if he resisted. Like Gomez, Pérez Jiménez had a theoretician, Laureano Vallenilla Lanz, who happened to be the son of Gomez's own historian and had his father's persuasions. Like his father, Laureano was also a racist which became a factor when he authored the national immigration policy. By the time Pérez Jiménez had all the power in his hands, which despite his uninspiring qualities he did manage to do, Venezuela had around five million inhabitants. Depending on which measures you apply, the country can be said to have been under-populated. If you consider, for instance, that population density is not necessarily good, then it could be argued that Venezuela was not under-populated but under-educated. Vallenilla Lanz and Pérez Jiménez's idea was to open the doors of the country to as many Europeans as wanted to come, with which they, and many non-pardo Venezuelans, believed that two flies would be killed with one swat: the country's population would grow, but not with more uneducated pardos but with Europeans who brought with them, however lowly they might have been in their own countries, a higher than average education compared to most Venezuelans. The policy backfired as the immigrants were from the exact countries that had given rise to the existence of pardos.

Up to a point, this kind of social engineering might have been defensible, but the immigrants, who came from Spain, Portugal, and Italy on the rationale that they would adapt better to Venezuela and Venezuelans would adapt better to them (than, say, to Swedes), did not emigrate from their countries to give Venezuelans lessons in civics. They came for a better income and the majority of the roughly two million who did come returned home as soon as they had made enough to live better in their own lands. This emigration peaked during the 1980s, when Venezuela's economy took a tumble. It is possible that the proportion of the white population in Venezuela might have increased slightly. Many of the emigrants did make a lot of money and chose Venezuela as their country, but as to industrializing or increasing agricultural production, their effect was not and is not noticeable; and this for the simple reason that the Venezuelan government considered that diversified industrial development was its responsibility and private citizens of any nationality—in this sense, it can be said that Venezuela is perhaps the most un-discriminatory country in the world—were given ample rights in the areas of commerce, of services, and of other ancillary activities. Despite this insidious racism, it was under Pérez Jiménez that the mythification of the Amerindian caciques, who supposedly had resisted the conquistadors everywhere in Venezuela, was given a big boost, especially when an exchange house founded by an Italian immigrant (Italcambio) brought out a series of souvenir gold coins in which each cacique was depicted with facial traits that were invented out of whole cloth by Pérez Jiménez's laureate painter, Pedro Francisco Vallenilla. Despite his rigorous Catholic upbringing, Pérez Jiménez also encouraged the underlying animism of Venezuelans when he erected in the middle of Caracas’ first speedway a statue of Maria Lionza, a sort of Amerindian goddess who sits atop a tapir and is much worshipped in a jungle sanctuary in Yaracuy in central Venezuela.

Pérez Jiménez, confident that he had done good work as dictator, scheduled elections for 1952. His official party ran against COPEI and URD, which had only managed puny showings against AD in the presidential election of 1947. When the time came to vote, Venezuela's pardos wanted their adecos back and the exiled leadership of the party let it be known that it wanted URD to win. As the results started coming in showing that AD was still the political top dog in Venezuela, Pérez Jiménez shut down the polls, and the country, and after a few days, during which he probably was making sure that he counted with the loyalty of his generals, he published results that were so lopsidedly in his favor as to seem ludicrous. Pérez Jiménez thus inaugurated himself for another five years as president, and just as he had intended from the beginning.

He went on spending on infrastructure and way beyond this to gigantic industrial, agricultural, and power-generating projects. In foreign affairs, Venezuela was a faithful ally of the American government, although servile would probably be more to the point. When the government of the socialist Jacobo Arbenz in Guatemala was implementing real social reforms in a country that badly needed them, Venezuela was host to a conference of the OAS (Organization of American States) in which Guatemala was ostracized. Shortly afterwards the CIA sponsored a coup in which Arbenz was overthrown. Pérez Jiménez also changed entirely the face of Caracas with a building program such as the city had not seen since Guzman Blanco, and compared to what Pérez Jiménez built, Guzman's buildings, one of which Pérez Jiménez had cut at the nose, were dwarfs. The author of this "face lifting" was Luis Malausena, whose taste was in all to Pérez Jiménez's sense of grandeur and went from the ultra-modern to a non-descript "neo-classicism". The Caracas that one sees today is, then, the unimaginative creation of a character whom no one remembers, and no one probably will as, after he made millions upon millions, he fled the country with Pérez Jiménez, never to be seen again. Caraqueños, incidentally, have never complained about the legacy of Malausena.

The next presidential election fell due by the end of 1957. Pérez Jiménez thought he had learned from the 1952 political debacle and instead of an election he decreed a plebiscite on his government. He probably knew he wasn't going to win this one either, so the results were rigged. The people who queued to vote were civil servants and indirect employees of the government and its subordinate companies and institutions, who were instructed to show some proof that they had voted for the regime, usually by presenting the "no" card, although this was a silly ploy. All the government needed was a turnout, and that is what it got. Economically, Venezuela apparently was not doing so badly, but the signs of prosperity were mostly in the cities, and the countryside, where half of Venezuelans still lived, had social indexes way below what would have been expected from such a fiscally rich country.

== 1958 coup d'état ==
=== Background ===
On 11 June 1957 Fabricio Ojeda had invited two other Democratic Republican Union (URD) members and a Communist, Guillermo Garcia Ponce, to his home, and they agreed that the time was ripe to form a multi-partisan organisation aiming to overthrow Jiménez. The Patriotic Junta was soon joined by Democratic Action and COPEI, and used the only clandestine press left in Venezuela, that of the Communist Party of Venezuela, to publish a manifesto. The Junta ultimately played a leading role in coordinating the coup d'état that took place on 23 January 1958, including organising a general strike on 21 January.

=== 31 December 1957 ===
Pérez Jiménez's illegitimacy was so patent that some officers conspired to overthrow him. There was also some cautious civilian clandestine agitation. On the last day of 1957, a military uprising coordinated by officers of air and tank forces struck, but the coordination was not that good. The air force rebels flew over Caracas and dropped randomly some bombs while a commander started out from Maracay with a column of tanks. Somehow the signals got crossed, the tanks turned back, and the pilots fled the country. These officers probably thought that Pérez Jiménez would turn tail in the face of this demonstration, but the bulk of the armed forces remained loyal.

=== January 1958 ===
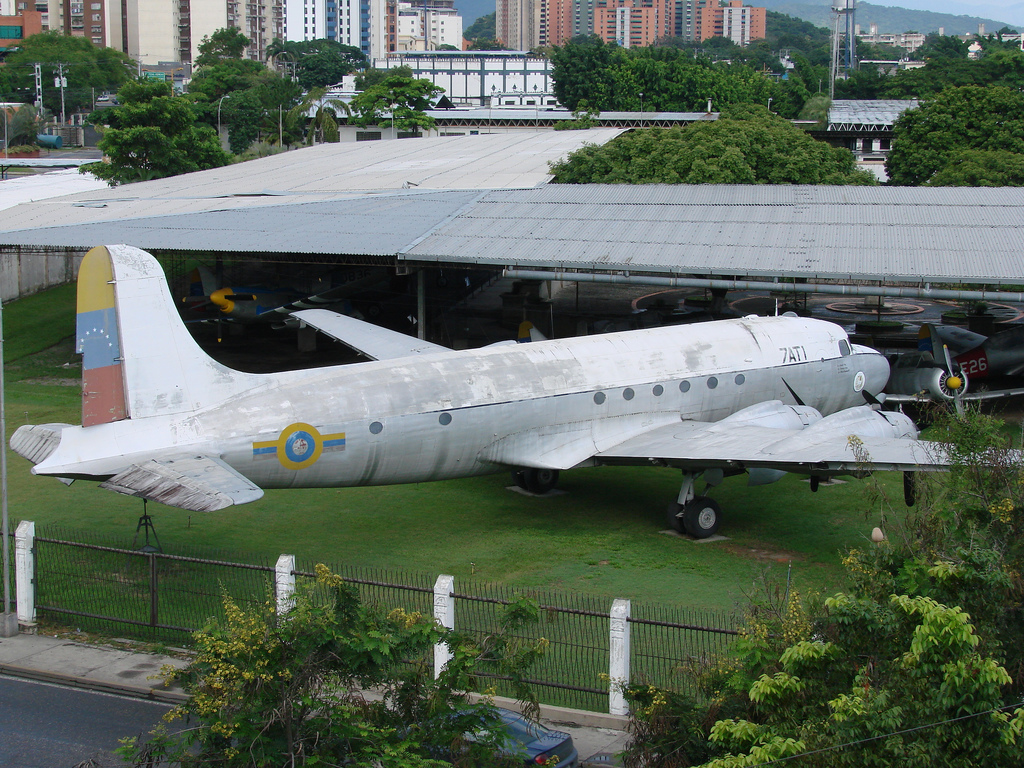
La Vaca Sagrada, in which Marcos Pérez Jiménez fled to the Dominican Republic.

However, this show of defiance did set off a sequence of events which eventually made Pérez Jiménez fear for his political survival. The underground civilian opponents started goading the people in Caracas, where they needed little goading and were out in the streets whenever and wherever they could. The repressive secret police rounded up all civilian suspects, but this was like trying to do the little Dutch boy trick. The popular resistance to the government was not just a pardo thing and reached to all levels of society. The navy had taken a non-committal attitude in a situation where its guns were not of any service. It was not in on any conspiracy. There were signs of restiveness in the land forces with some officers working to rules, so to speak, but there was not at any time a military insurrection. But the crowds were getting bigger and bigger. Finally, with various suitcases stuffed with dollars, Pérez Jiménez took off in his private DC-3 and sought refuge in the Dominican Republic, where his resilient colleague, Rafael Leónidas Trujillo, had been ruling since 1930.

=== Transition ===
The flight of the dictator ushered in an amazing incident in the history of Venezuela. Pérez Jiménez had been unsure of whom to trust. He was arbitrary and authoritarian but there is no evidence that he was particularly courageous. Like Guzman Blanco, he possibly considered that hanging on to power was not worth the effort, especially considering that his fortune would allow him to live royally outside of Venezuela. When he fled, the country was for all practical purposes leaderless. The Caracas masses had no leader, because no one in the streets had the stature to be one, and any potential leader was in jail. For various days before his hasty departure, Pérez Jiménez had not been giving any inspiration or even orders to the army generals loyal to him, which were still a majority. There were junior officers here and there acting on their own. A military committee was functioning in the military academy. When these officers received word that Pérez Jiménez had left, they felt - reasonably enough - that it was up to them to exercise authority. Thus it was that Wolfgang Larrazábal, an admiral who owed to Pérez Jiménez his rise in the services and who had never manifested any disaffection to him, was chosen to lead the country solely because he outranked every one else. Had Pérez Jiménez ordered the commander of the Caracas garrison to arrest any officer not at his post and to put the fear of volleys into the crowds, he would have been obeyed, so in some way it redounds to his credit that, like Medina Angarita before him, he ran because he did not want bloodshed, although Medina had not run at all but had been imprisoned and released. As soon as it became unmistakable that Pérez Jiménez was out, the exiled politicians started streaming in. Larrazábal was made head of a civilian-military junta. Overnight, without having lifted a finger to deserve it, Larrazábal became the idol of Caracas, though in the rest of Venezuela the pardos were still adecos to the tip of their tails.

== Venezuelan transition to democracy ==
1958 marked a crucial year in Venezuelan contemporary history. Larrazábal was a fluke. He had no more legitimacy than Pérez Jiménez and no sooner was the new government installed, committed to democratic elections before the end of the year, than the question of who really had overthrown Pérez Jiménez, the military uprising or the Caracas masses, became a disquieting issue. The original rebellious officers felt that they were entitled to rule and started brewing their own conspiracies. But Larrazábal was generally accepted as the leader of the armed forces. Most importantly, the political parties, which were busily rebuilding their national organizations, gave him their total support, including the few but vociferous communists. As before, it was Betancourt who proved the master organizer through his revived AD party. Another source of support for Larrazábal was that he decreed demagogic measures to conciliate the discontented masses. These measures were being legislated in an ad hoc manner and one in particular, the most influential, was completely irrational.

A so-called Emergency Plan gave hand-outs to those who could claim they were unemployed. These popular subsidies were far above what the average Venezuelan earned in the rural areas and there followed inevitably a flood of migrants to Caracas, a city that before had few shantytowns, and settled and built shacks on the hillsides on the eastern and western edges of the valley in which Caracas nestles. The population of the city soon doubled with these rural, barely educated newcomers, who were obviously strongly pro-Larrazábal but were also a potential source of political de-stabilization. The pardos in effect became a force to be reckoned with in the forthcoming elections. But before these took place many things were occurring. The officers who felt they had been cheated staged various insurrections, even to an "invasion" by one of them from Colombia who managed to take over San Cristobal, the capital of Táchira state. All these conspiracies were contained although some required drastic means and at one point the Larrazábal government was in real danger of being toppled. The armed forces were instrumental in quelling the revolts, but each time there was one, Caracas mobs went wild prodded by the politicians.

The most menacing of these popular riots took place in May 1958 when U.S. vice-president Richard Nixon and his wife Pat visited Venezuela (see Attack on Richard Nixon's motorcade). Nixon represented the Dwight D. Eisenhower administration, which had conferred on Pérez Jiménez the Legion of Merit. The Venezuelan government had not anticipated the raging public reaction to this emissary from Washington, possibly because it thought that it had assuaged public indignation by allowing the hysterical daily denigration of the former dictator. Venezuelans were not that versed in foreign affairs, but the communists were and it was at their instigation that crowds assaulted Nixon's motorcade along an avenue that ran close to where many shantytowns had grown, ironically not far from a huge apartment complex that Pérez Jiménez had built for workers. Before the Venezuelan army intervened—preventing a ready-to-go Marines intervention—Nixon's car had been rocked back and forth, its windows had been smashed, and the vice-president and his wife had been thoroughly drenched in spit. As would be expected, once safe in the American embassy residence, Nixon let loose with imprecations and he returned quickly to the U.S. It says well of him that when he reported on his trip, which was meant as a fact-finding and conciliatory gesture to Latin America, he stressed that his country was partly to blame for the unfriendly reception in Caracas.

During the Cuban Revolution of the 1950s, a number of liberal organisations in Venezuela declared their support for Fidel Castro's guerrilla operations against Batista. The Venezuelan government refrained from taking a position on the Cuban rebellion, but unofficially during Larrazábal's Presidency contributed 50,000 dollars to Castro's revolutionaries.

=== Elections ===
As the elections approached, the three main parties, Democratic Action, COPEI and Democratic Republican Union (URD), initiated talks to form a united political front "in defence of democracy". This implied, if not a single candidate chosen among them, at least an understanding for future cooperation in ruling Venezuela. The pact, known as the Punto Fijo Pact (hence puntofijismo) remained essentially in place until Hugo Chávez' victory in 1998. The wily Betancourt, who sometimes is referred to as the "father of Venezuelan democracy" (much less in recent times than before), insisted that the Communist Party of Venezuela were not to be included in the political talks, and excluded they were but took it very calmly. The chances of one candidate were slim and nothing came out of the negotiations except a well-meaning consensus that the parties would stick together in the defense of democracy from whatever threats might arise in the future. This meant that the electoral process was on and that each party had to look out for itself.

Another significant pact that emerged during 1958 was the unspoken one by which the civilian political leadership, particularly Rómulo Betancourt, agreed not to interfere with the military in any way and let them run their own affairs. The military in their turn pledged that they would not allow politicization within their ranks — to the extent that they even renounced their own right to vote (voting became compulsory for the rest of the Venezuelans).

AD knew that it remained the most popular party all over Venezuela: it chose Betancourt as its candidate. Rafael Caldera had no rivals in COPEI, the party he founded, and he entered the political fray counting on the conservative middle class. Jóvito Villalba and his URD party adopted an opportunistic strategy, which was practically an admission that they could not compete with the AD national pardo popular base. It was the pardo masses in Caracas that Villalba was targeting when, instead of nominating himself, he chose Larrazábal, who also had the communists with him, to be the URD candidate. Larrazábal turned over the provisional presidency to a civilian, Edgar Sanabria, in October, and went on the campaign trail. When the results were in, Betancourt was elected for the term that ended in 1964, but this time by a plurality and not the absolute majorities that AD had achieved in 1946 and 1947. Caracas was no longer an AD redoubt. The city from then on became a marginal that could swing in any direction and this time it went all out for Larrazábal, who came in second. Caldera did not do badly in third place and received proportionally more votes than he had in 1947.
