= Presidency of Raúl Leoni =

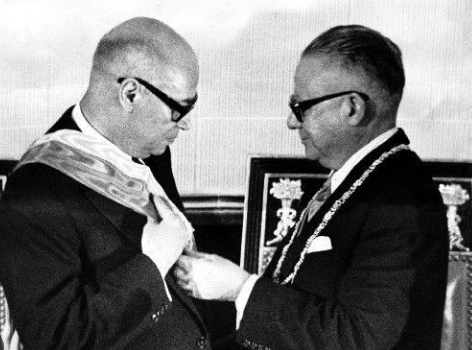
Raúl Leoni and Rómulo Betancourt. 1964.

Raúl Leoni served as President of Venezuela from March 13, 1964, to March 11, 1969.

== Background ==
In the elections of 1963 the Democratic Action (AD) candidate Raúl Leoni, a long-time ally of Rómulo Betancourt (President from 1959 to 1964) from the times of dictator Juan Vicente Gómez, won handily. Rafael Caldera of COPEI came second. The Wolfgang Larrazábal political phenomenon was eclipsed and Jóvito Villalba on his own came just behind Caldera. AD was still the pardo party by excellence, but Caracas was definitely lost.

== Cabinet ==
Ministries
OFFICE	NAME	TERM
President	Raúl Leoni	1964–1969
Home Affairs	Gonzalo Barrios	1964–1966
Home Affairs	Reinaldo Leandro Mora	1966–1969
Outer Relations	Ignacio Iribarren Borges	1964–1969
Finance	Andrés Germán Otero	1964–1965
Finance	Eddy Morales Crespo	1965–1967
Finance	Benito Raúl Losada	1967–1968
Finance	Francisco Mendoza	1968–1969
Defense	Ramón Florencio Gómez	1964–1969
Development	Manuel Egaña	1964
Development	Luis Hernández Solís	1964–1968
Development	Aura Celina Casanova	1968–1969
Public Works	Leopoldo Sucre Figarella	1964–1969
Education	José Manuel Siso Martínez	1964–1969
Labor	Eloy Lares Martínez	1964
Labor	Hens Silva Torres	1964–1967
Labor	Simón Antoni Paván	1967–1968
Labor	Raúl Valera	1968–1969
Communications	Lorenzo Azpúrua Marturet	1964
Communications	J. J. González Gorrondona	1964–1966
Communications	Héctor Santaella	1966–1967
Communications	Juan Manuel Domínguez Chacín	1967–1968
Communications	Lorenzo Azpúrua Marturet	1968–1969
Agriculture	Alejandro Osorio	1964
Agriculture	Juan José Palacios	1964–1965
Agriculture	Pedro Segnini La Cruz	1965–1966
Agriculture	Alejandro Osorio	1966–1969
Health and Social Assistance	Alfredo Arreaza Guzmán	1964
Health and Social Assistance	Domingo Guzmán Lander	1964–1967
Health and Social Assistance	Alfonso Araujo Belloso	1967–1968
Health and Social Assistance	Armando Soto Rivera	1968–1969
Justice	Miguel Ángel Burelli Rivas	1964
Justice	Ramón Escovar Salom	1964–1966
Justice	José S. Núñez Aristimuño	1966–1969
Mines and Hydrocarbons	Manuel Pérez Guerrero	1964–1967
Mines and Hydrocarbons	José Antonio Mayobre	1967–1969
Secretary of Presidency	Manuel Mantilla	1964–1969

== Presidency ==
=== Judicial policy ===
The Law on Commutation of Sentences by Pardon or Banishment from National Territory (Ley de conmutación de penas por indulto o extrañamiento del territorio nacional) was enacted in Venezuela, decreed on 15 December 1964 by President Raúl Leoni and published in the Official Gazette No. 27,619.

On 7 August 1968, the government ordered the release of 67 political prisoners and the exile of Simón Sáez Mérida.

=== Economy ===
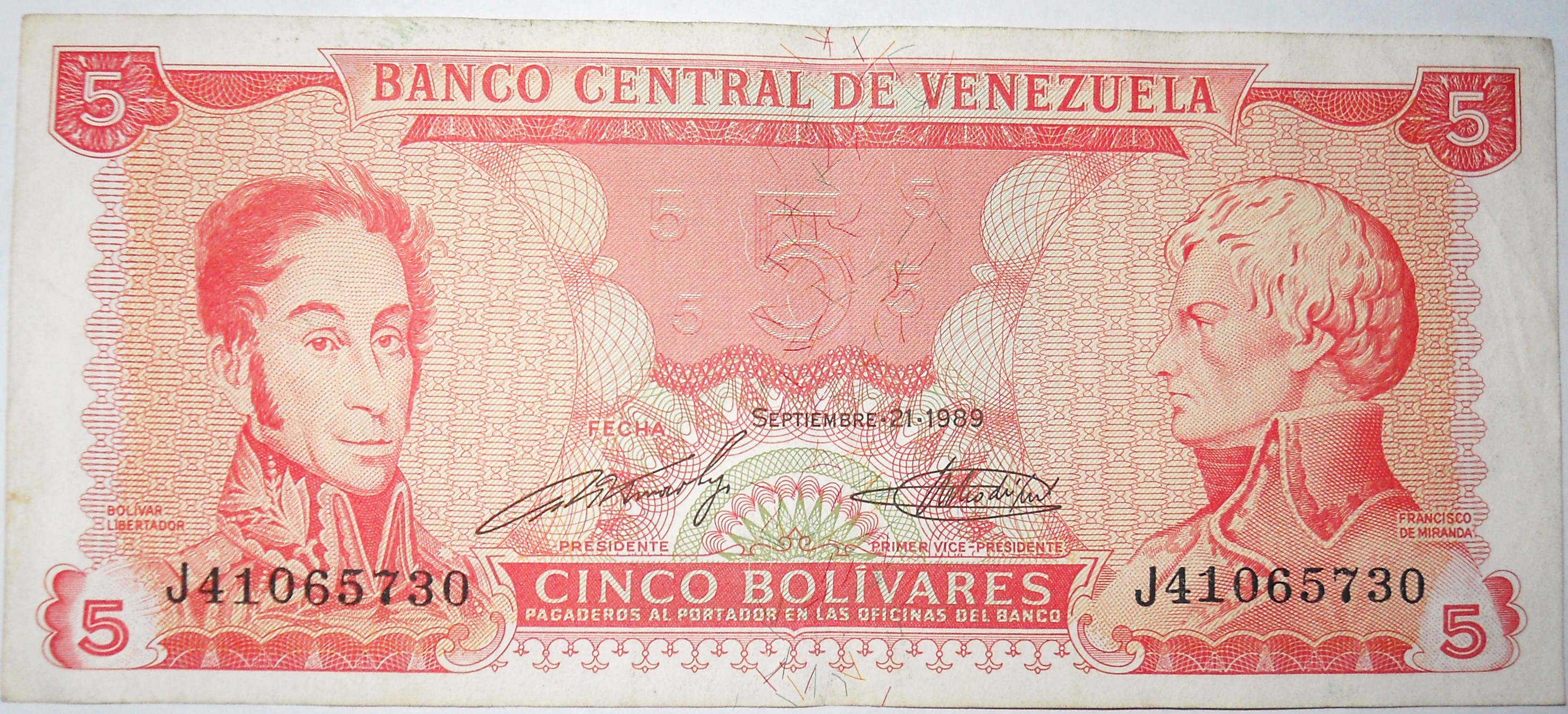
The five bolívar banknote entered circulation in 1968 as part of Venezuela's monetary system.

The administration implemented significant fiscal reforms, including a reduction in public spending coupled with an increase in the nation's international reserves. In 1967, his government enacted a comprehensive reform through a new Income Tax Law.

=== Energy ===
During this period, Venezuela broke its annual oil export record, reaching an average of 3.6 million barrels per day by 1968.

=== Education ===
During Raúl Leoni's presidency, two police raids were conducted at the Central University of Venezuela (UCV): the first on 15 May 1964 and the second on 14 December 1966.

=== Agriculture ===
During Leoni's presidency, rice production increased by 107%, while corn production rose by 39.5%. By the end of his term, nearly 85% of the nation's food consumption was domestically sourced.

=== Infrastructure ===
Raúl Leoni's presidency saw the construction of the Guri Dam, a power station with a combined installed capacity of 1750 megawatts (MW) that created a reservoir which is the largest fresh water body of water in Venezuela and one of the largest man-made blackwater lakes ever created.

=== Environment ===
In 1967, the Caño Mánamo (a distributary of the Orinoco River) was closed as part of an infrastructure project by the Venezuelan Corporation of Guayana (CVG). According to Monsonyi and Jackson (1990), this led to the "complete ecological destruction of the western Delta: water stagnation and salinization, the decline of local flora and fauna, the disintegration of numerous agricultural communities (both Creole and Indigenous)", and the "death by hunger, thirst, and disease of thousands (possibly around 3,000) Warao Indigenous people".

=== Human Rights ===
During the counterinsurgency campaign against guerrilla movements, numerous arrests were made of insurgents, civilians, and politicians accused of collaboration. Reports emerged of procedural delays and modifications to the Penal Code to increase penalties for sedition-related crimes. Several media outlets faced censorship, including the newspapers El Clarín and La Extra, the magazine Venezuela Gráfica, and outlets linked to the Cadena Capriles.

==== Forced disappearances ====
According to Revista SIC, Venezuela experienced "the highest number of forced disappearances by police or military forces in the continent during the 1960s."

Under Raúl Leoni's presidency, the parliamentary group Vanguardia Popular Nacionalista (VPN), including deputies José Vicente Rangel, Luis Miquilena and José Herrera Oropeza, denounced extrajudicial executions and clandestine detention centers where detainees were allegedly tortured, killed, and their remains concealed.

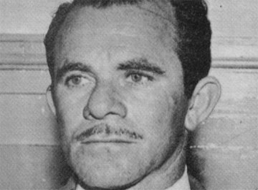
Alberto Lovera, general secretary of the Communist Party, was murdered in 1965

A prominent case was that of Alberto Lovera, general secretary of the Communist Party (PCV), who was abducted in public in 1965 and his weighted body dumped at sea, though it later washed ashore near Lechería. Following these revelations, Congress formed an investigative commission, and the Attorney General launched an inquiry. The congressional investigations also examined the disappearances of sociologist Víctor Soto Rojas (allegedly thrown from a helicopter in El Bachiller, Miranda state) and Humberto Barrios.

On 29 August 1965, the General Amnesty Council, comprising trade unions and professional associations, met at Caracas' Casa del Periodista and published a report condemning state-sponsored human rights violations, including documented disappearances.

== Foreign policy ==
Leoni maintained the foreign policy framework established by Rómulo Betancourt, known as the Betancourt Doctrine. In 1966, Venezuela joined the Latin American Free Trade Association (ALALC) and later that year, Leoni signed the Cartagena Agreement in Bogotá (a precursor to the Andean Community), a trade bloc comprising Venezuela, Chile, Colombia, Peru, and Ecuador.

=== International trips ===
The following article provides a summary of the official foreign visits made by Leoni as President of Venezuela:

==== 1966 ====
Date	Place	Main purpose
August	Bogotá (Colombia)	Official visit together with the president of Chile Eduardo Frei. Includes a banquet at the Palace of San Carlos.

==== 1967 ====
Date	Place	Main purpose
11 April	(Chile)	
12 April	Punta del Este (Uruguay)	Conference of Presidents of the American states. Leoni met with the president of the United States, Lyndon B. Johnson, with whom he discussed issues such as the sulfur content of Venezuelan oil and discrimination in U.S. import programs.
20 September	Bridge over the Arauca River (Border Colombia-Venezuela)	Inauguration of the bridge and meeting with the Colombian president Carlos Lleras. Reaffirmation of the principles of continental solidarity in defense of democracy and against the activities of subversive groups.

== Opposition ==
=== Guerrillas ===
Leoni's government was unexceptional, but it was Leoni who had to liquidate the remnants of the communist insurrection, for which he put the army in charge of the country with carte blanche to be as ruthless as it had to. But in fact it was the communist guerrilleros themselves who brought about their own liquidation. They had no rural support whatsoever. Unlike guerrillas all over the world, they did not control villages and lived from hand to mouth. They knew they were no match for the army and avoided confrontations. Castro had been hoping that Venezuela would be the second act of the Latin American revolution, and he tried to supply the Venezuelan guerrillas. This was in keeping with the theory of what could be called the "permanent agrarian revolution", which the French intellectual Régis Debray had expressed in the widely circulated book Revolution Inside the Revolution and Ernesto "Che" Guevara had been trying to carry out first in Africa and later, fatally for him, in Bolivia. Castro sent a trusted officer, Manuel Ochoa, to assess the Venezuelan guerrillas, and the report that he brought was negative, which effectively ended Cuba's intervention in Venezuelan affairs. By then the Venezuelan leftists had given up on violence and were seeking legalization, but Leoni did not offer it. Ochoa was later tried and executed by Castro on an unlikely charge of drug-smuggling.

== See also ==
- History of Venezuela (1908–1958)
