= 1958 Venezuelan coup d'état =

Overthrow of Venezuelan dictator Marcos Pérez Jiménez

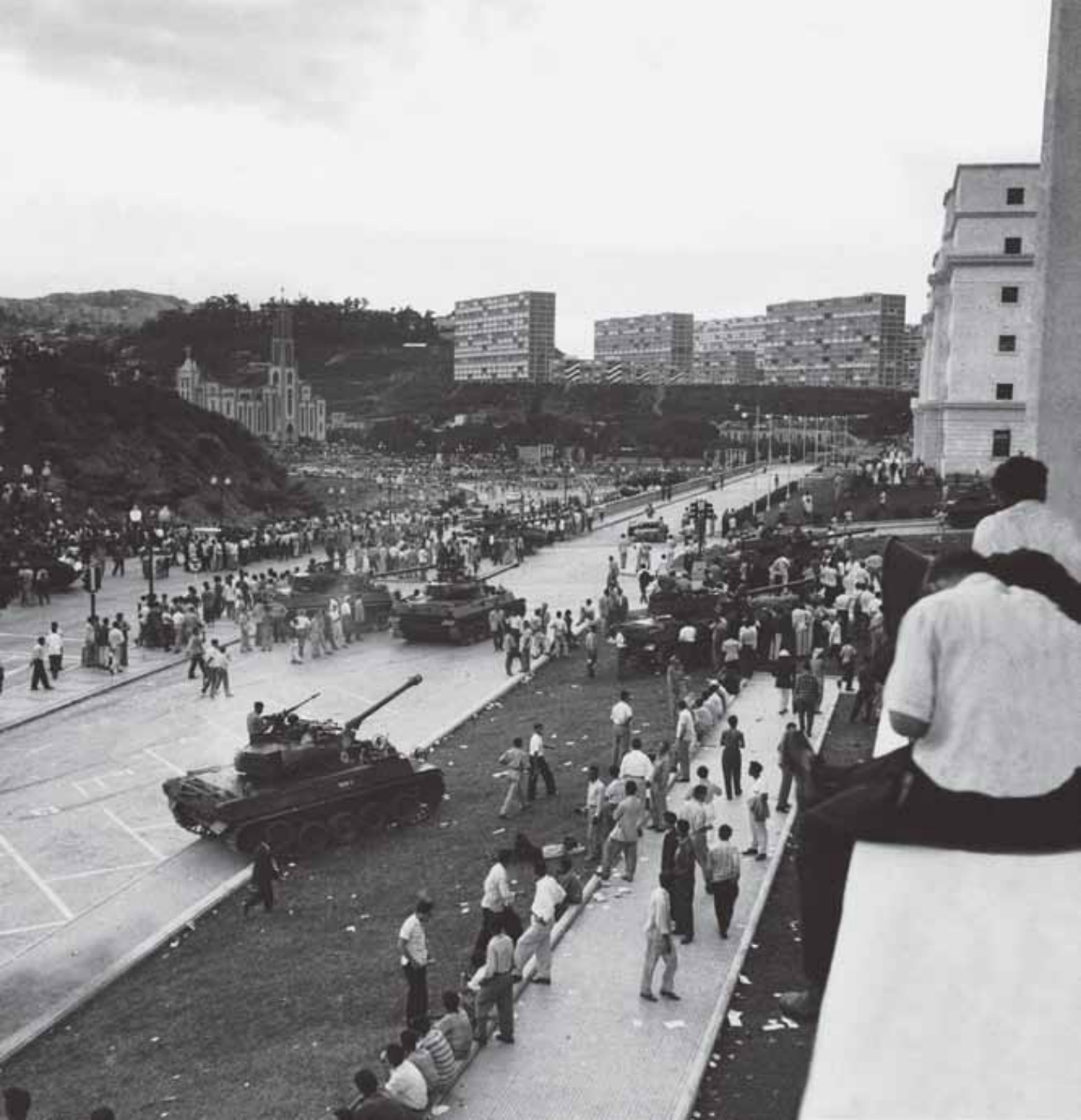
Date	23 January 1958
Location	Venezuela
Result	Coup successful; Democracy restored; Transition government created by Wolfgang Larrazábal and Edgar Sanabria; Venezuelan 1958 elections; Puntofijo Pact

Belligerents
Government of Venezuela	Patriotic Junta; Democratic Action; Copei; Communist Party; Democratic Republican Union

Commanders and leaders
Marcos Pérez Jiménez (Venezuela) Pedro Estrada	Wolfgang Larrazábal; Silvestre Ortiz Bucarán; Fabricio Ojeda; Enrique Aristeguieta Gramcko; Guillermo García Ponce

The 1958 Venezuelan coup d'état took place on 23 January 1958, when the dictator Marcos Pérez Jiménez was overthrown.

A transition government under first Adm. Wolfgang Larrazábal and then Edgar Sanabria was put in place until December 1958 elections saw Democratic Action candidate Rómulo Betancourt elected and take office on 13 February 1959.

One of Caracas' neighbourhoods, Barrio 23 de Enero (23 January neighbourhood), is named for the event.

== Events ==
=== Background ===
In December 1957 there was a referendum to extend the mandate of Pérez Jiménez to solidify his regime and legitimize the armed forces.

The closest precedent for the coup occurred on New Year's Day, 1 January 1958, when Venezuelan Air Force fighter planes soared into the sky over waking Caracas. The shock was tremendous, even for the supporters of the government, after the recent referendum.

The causes that led to the fall of Pérez Jiménez were twofold. Firstly, the military crisis, originating from the above event on 1 January 1958, disrupted the absolute power that until then had belonged to the National Armed Forces. A crisis occurred in the leadership of both the Air Force Base in Boca de Río, near the city of Maracay, and the 1st Armored Battalion commanded by Lt. Col. Hugo Trejo of the Army. Secondly, the coup was caused by the political crisis within the government itself from the breakdown and fragmentation caused by the December 1957 plebiscite resulted in two successive cabinet changes on 10 and 13 January 1958.

Since the events of 1 January, the Pérez Jiménez government had begun to publish various manifestos against shaky government that were signed by men and women representing different fields of economic activity, professional, cultural and public, as well as pronouncements of national institutions such as the College of Engineering, the Venezuelan Association of Journalists, labor federations and business sectors, which, until then, had not openly expressed their rejection of the dictatorship. All street actions against the regime peaked in the general strike on 21 January, mobilized by the union of the various political parties, along with students, business leaders and the poor and working class residents of the capital.

=== Popular unrest ===
External videos
- "Hours Of Revolt In Venezuela" newsreel covering the events on YouTube

The first open demonstration against the regime occurred on 27 March 1957, at a performance of Aaron Copland's Lincoln Portrait directed by the composer. Actress Juana Sujo read the text in Spanish translation in the presence of Pérez Jiménez. Near the conclusion, as Sujo quoted from the Gettysburg Address, the audience cheered her and began shouting against the president so vociferously that Copland could not hear the music. An American foreign service officer told Copland that his Lincoln Portrait as read by Sujo had, in effect, started the revolution.

=== Coup actions ===
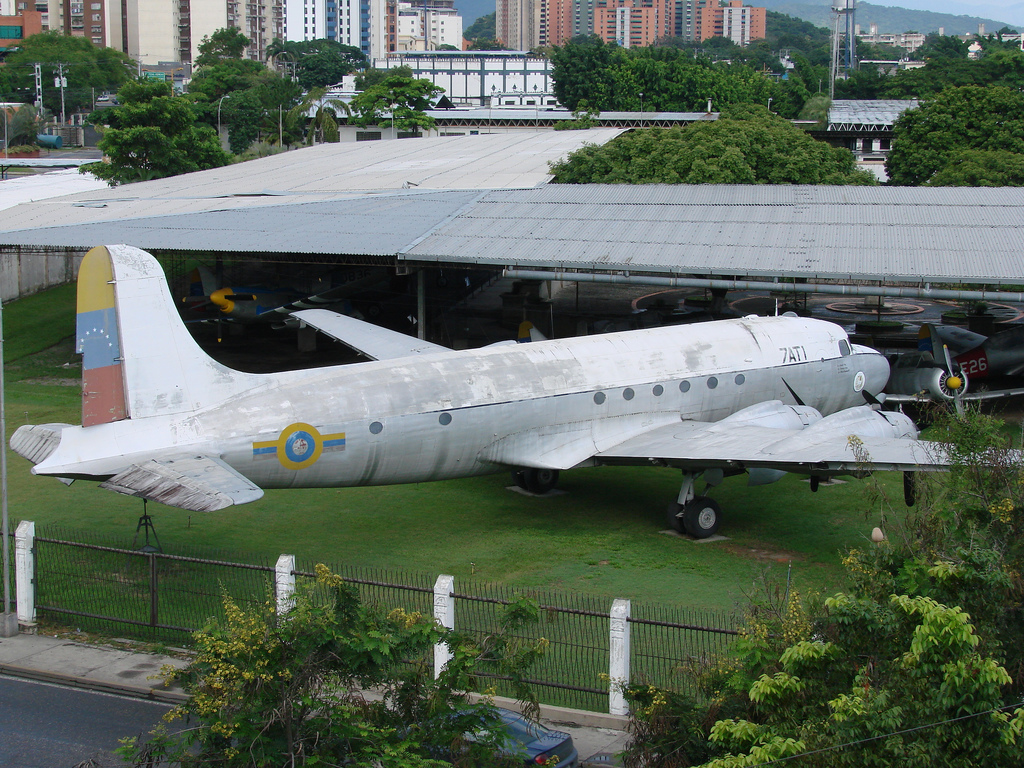
La Vaca Sagrada, in which Marcos Pérez Jiménez fled to the Dominican Republic.

In the early hours of 23 January, despite having the support of an important sector of the Armed Forces, Pérez Jiménez decided to abandon the Miraflores Palace and move to La Carlota Airport, located in the city of Caracas, to embark upon a plane to the Dominican Republic. At news of the overthrow, the people took to the streets, looting the houses of the regime's supporters, attacking the headquarters of the National Security and lynching officials.

Also destroyed was the headquarters of the government newspaper El Heraldo. Moreover, in a few hours the Miraflores Palace became the meeting place of the rebels and many political leaders, who proceeded to appoint a Provisional Government Junta that replaced the ousted regime. The Board constituted Adm. Wolfgang Larrazábal, Commanding General of the Navy, as president along with Cols. Luis Carlos Araque, Pedro José Quevedo, Roberto Casanova and Abel Romero Villate. At dawn of 23 January, Venezuelans celebrated the fall of Pérez Jiménez, while protesting the presence of the Governing Board perejimenismo members including Romero Casanova Villate, who eventually were forced to resign and were later replaced on 24 January by businessmen Eugenio Mendoza and Blas Lamberti.

== Aftermath ==
To facilitate the work of the Governing Board and the restoration of democracy in Venezuela, a caretaker cabinet was established, composed of lawyers, businessmen and executives and Col. Jesús María Castro León of the Ministry of Defence. Subsequently, the Governing Board called elections for December of that year, released political prisoners across the country, expanding the Patriotic Council with representatives of independent sectors, appointing journalist Fabricio Ojeda as chair. It also began the process of punishing returning Jimenista exiles.

== See also ==
- History of Venezuela (1948–1958)

== Bibliography ==
- Hagedorn, Dan. "Latin Mitchells: North American B-25s in South America, Part Three". Air Enthusiast No. 107, September/October 2003. pp. 36–41. ISSN 0143-5450
