= Ignacio Luis Arcaya =

Venezuelan lawyer and politician

President of the Chamber of Deputies of the Congress of Venezuela
- In office 1962–1964
- Preceded by: Manuel Vicente Ledezma
- Succeeded by: Héctor Santaella

Minister of Foreign Affairs of Venezuela
- In office 13 February 1959 – 28 August 1960
- President: Rómulo Betancourt
- Preceded by: René De Sola
- Succeeded by: Marcos Falcón Briceño

Personal details
- Born: 3 May 1912
- Died: 4 September 1990 (aged 78)
- Profession: politician, lawyer

Ignacio Luis Arcaya Rivero (Santa Ana de Coro, 3 May 1912 – Caracas, 4 September 1990), was a Venezuelan lawyer and politician. He was one of the signatories of the Puntofijo Pact on behalf of his party, the Democratic Republican Union (URD).

He was Minister of Foreign Affairs of Venezuela 1959–1960 and took part in the 7th Organization of American States conference on 16 August 1960, where against his President's wishes, he abstained on the issue of Cuban relations with the Organization of American States. He was President of the Venezuelan Chamber of Deputies 1962–1964, and became a Supreme Court of Venezuela judge in 1965.

He was the Prime Minister of Foreign Affairs until 28 August 1960.

== Personal life and family ==
Ignacio Luis Arcaya had a son, Ignacio Arcaya (1939), who went on to become a career diplomat. In 2001 the National Assembly of Venezuela created an "Order of Merit Ignacio Luis Arcaya".

== See also ==
- List of ministers of foreign affairs of Venezuela
- rulers.org

Political offices
Preceded by René De Sola	163rd Minister of Foreign Affairs of Venezuela; 13 February 1959 – 28 August 1960	Succeeded by Marcos Falcón Briceño
