= 1957 Venezuelan referendum =

Referendum on terms of office

15 December 1957

Results
Choice	Votes	%
Yes	2,374,790	86.70%
No	364,182	13.30%
Valid votes	2,738,972	93.64%
Invalid or blank votes	186,013	6.36%
Total votes	2,924,985	100.00%

A referendum on the presidential term and national and regional governors was held in Venezuela on 15 December 1957. Voters were asked whether they approved of President Marcos Pérez Jiménez remaining in power without fresh elections, and appointing government nominees as members of the national parliament, regional assemblies and local councils. Jiménez had been installed as President after the military rejected the results of the 1952 Venezuelan Constituent Assembly election. With the referendum held under non-democratic conditions, the measures were reportedly approved by 87% of voters.

== Results ==
Choice	Votes	%
For	2,374,790	86.70
Against	364,182	13.30
Total	2,738,972	100.00
Valid votes	2,738,972	93.64
Invalid/blank votes	186,013	6.36
Total votes	2,924,985	100.00
Source: Nohlen
