= Ismenia Villalba =

Venezuelan politician

- Born: September 18, 1929; Pampatar, Nueva Esparta, Venezuela
- Died: September 19, 2009; Caracas, Venezuela
- Occupation: Politician
- Spouse: Jóvito Villalba

Ismenia Villalba (Pampatar, Nueva Esparta, September 18, 1929 – Caracas, September 19, 2009), was a Venezuelan politician.

== Career ==
Ismenia Villalba served as deputy for Caracas and Nueva Esparta and was the first woman that participates in a presidential election in Venezuela, representing the Unión Republicana Democrática in the 1988 election. She won less than 1% of the vote.

== Personal life ==
She was married with Jóvito Villalba, also a politician.

== See also ==
- Venezuela
- Politics of Venezuela
