= 1963 Venezuelan general election =

- 1 December 1963
- Presidential election
- Registered: 3,367,787
- Turnout: 92.27% (▼1.15pp)
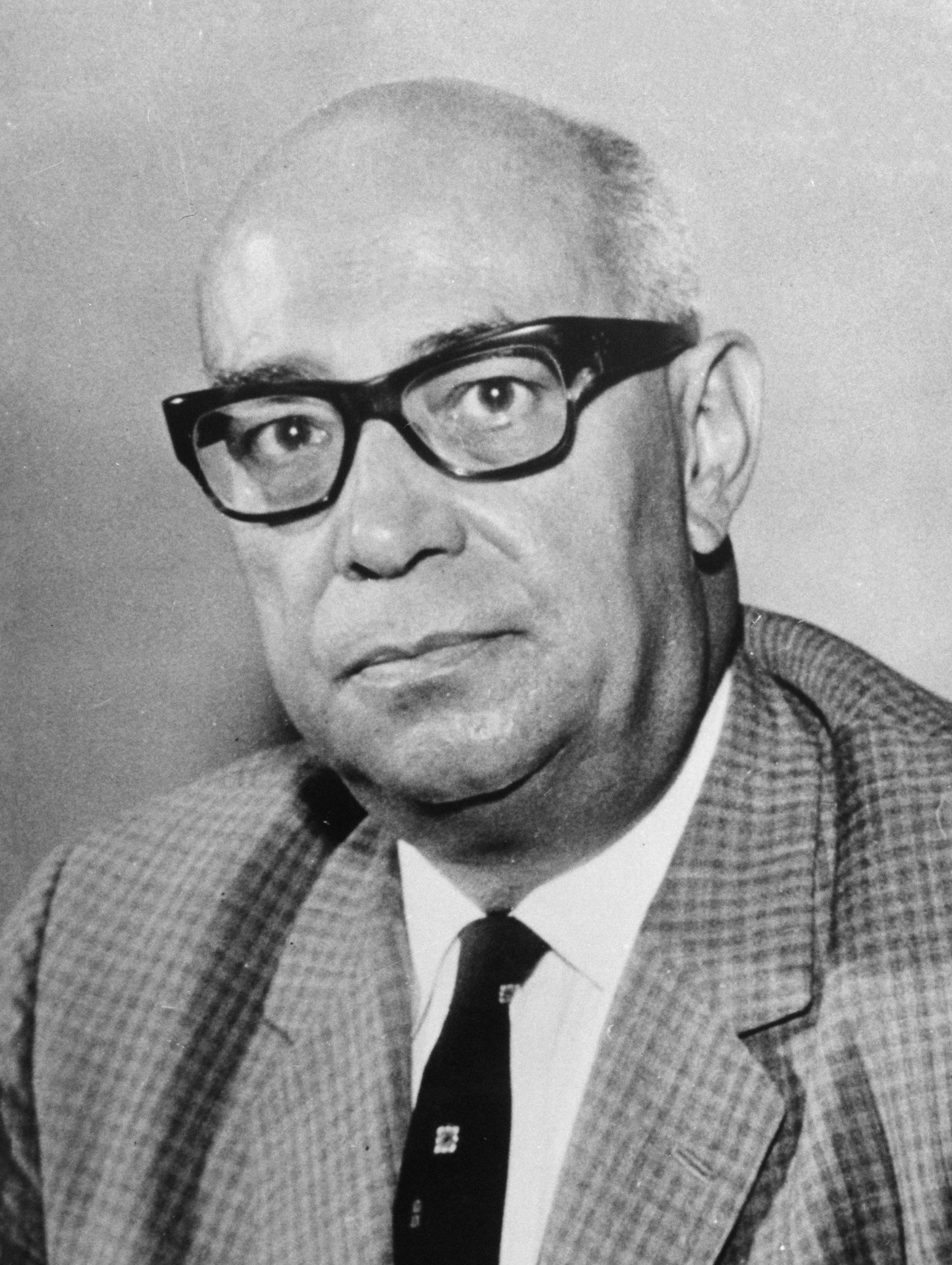

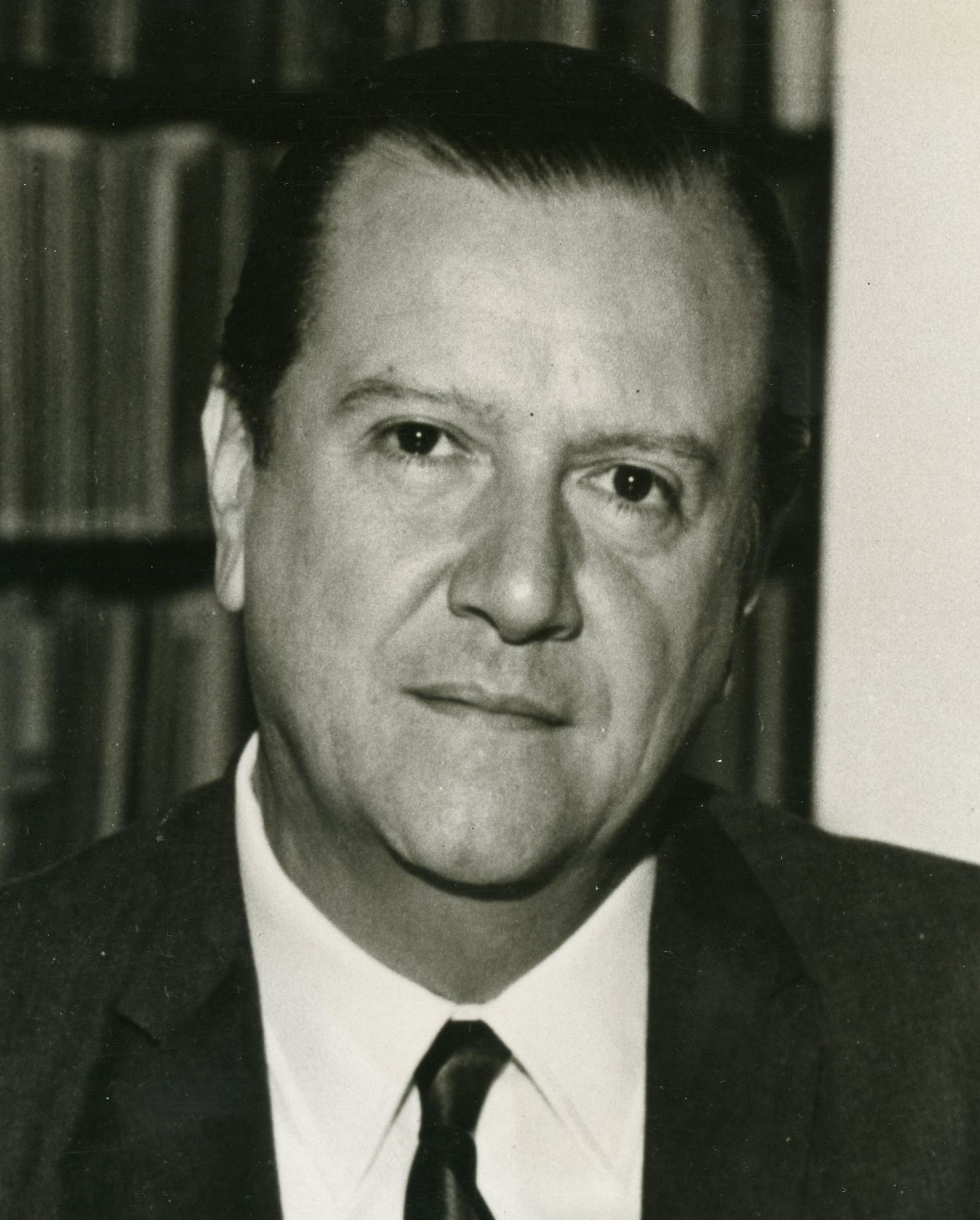

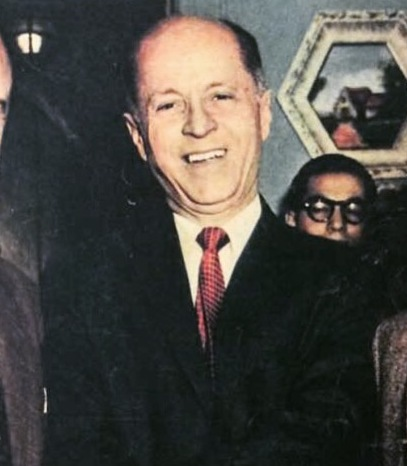

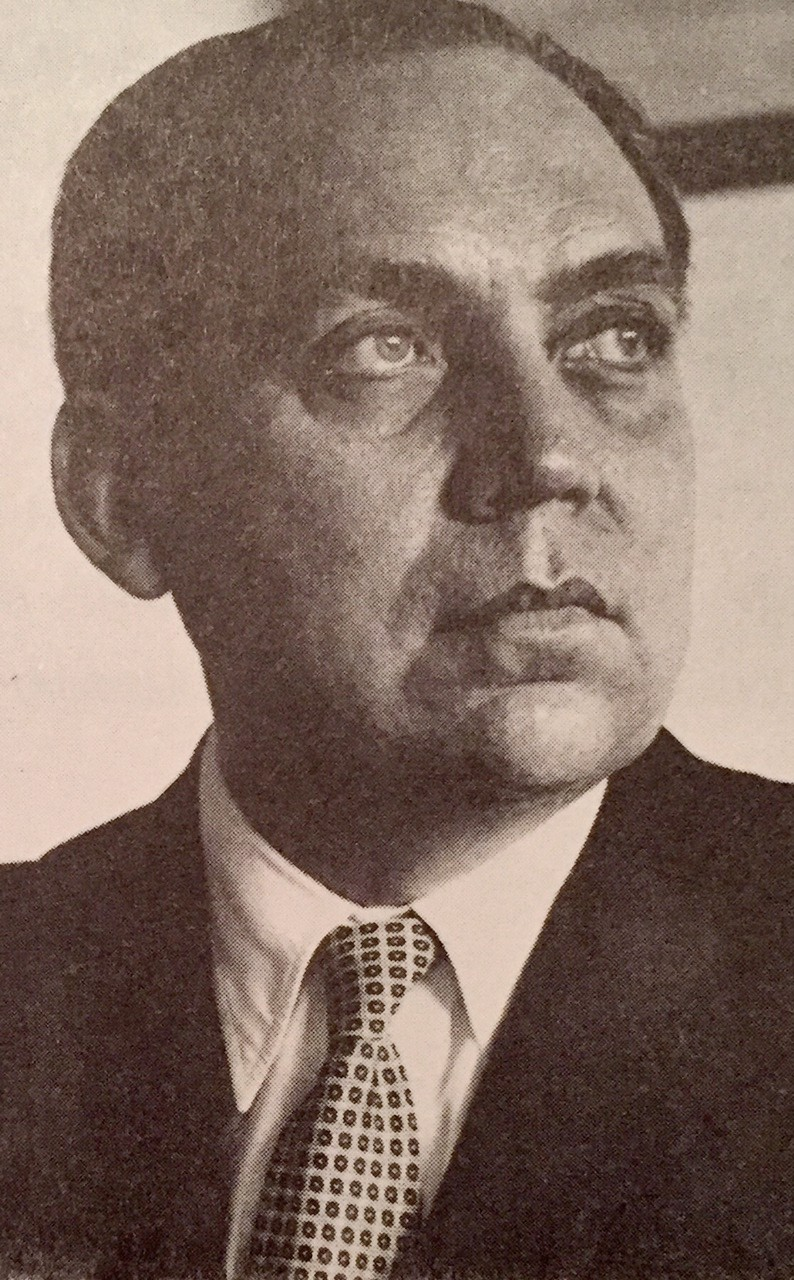

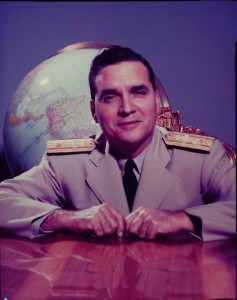
Nominee	Raúl Leoni	Rafael Caldera	Jóvito Villalba
Party	Democratic Action	Copei	Democratic Republican
Popular vote	957,574	589,177	551,266
Percentage	32.81%	20.19%	18.89%
Nominee	Arturo Uslar	Wolfgang Larrazábal
Party	Democratic National Front	Popular Democratic Front
Popular vote	469,363	275,325
Percentage	16.08%	9.43%
President before election
Rómulo Betancourt
Democratic Action
Elected President
Raúl Leoni
Democratic Action

General elections were held in Venezuela on 1 December 1963. The presidential elections were won by Raúl Leoni of the Democratic Action political party, who received 32.8% of the vote. Leoni's party won 66 of the 179 seats in the Chamber of Deputies and 22 of the 47 seats in the Senate. Voter turnout was 92.3% in the presidential election and 90.8% in the Congressional elections.

== Results ==
=== President ===
Candidate	Party	Votes	%
Raúl Leoni	Democratic Action	957,574	32.81
Rafael Caldera	Copei	589,177	20.19
Jóvito Villalba	URD–PSV–MENI	551,266	18.89
Arturo Uslar Pietri	Independents for the National Front	469,363	16.08
Wolfgang Larrazábal	Popular Democratic Front	275,325	9.43
Raúl Ramos Giménez	Opposition Democratic Action	66,880	2.29
Germán Borregales	National Action Movement	9,292	0.32
Total		2,918,877	100.00
Valid votes		2,918,877	93.93
Invalid/blank votes		188,686	6.07
Total votes		3,107,563	100.00
Registered voters/turnout		3,367,787	92.27
Source: Nohlen

=== Congress ===
Party	Votes	%	Seats			
Party	Votes	%	Chamber	+/–	Senate	+/–
Democratic Action	936,124	32.78	66	–7	22	–10
Copei	595,697	20.86	39	+19	8	+2
Democratic Republican Union	497,454	17.42	29	–5	7	–4
Independents for the National Front	381,600	13.36	22	New	5	New
Popular Democratic Front	274,096	9.60	16	New	4	New
Opposition Democratic Action	93,494	3.27	5	New	1	New
Socialist Party of Venezuela	24,670	0.86	1	+1	0	0
Independent National Electoral Movement	18,510	0.65	1	+1	0	0
National Action Movement	15,746	0.55	0	New	0	New
National Authentic Party	14,555	0.51	0	New	0	New
Popular Electoral Crusade Group S	4,230	0.15	0	New	0	New
Total	2,856,176	100.00	179	+47	47	–4
Valid votes	2,856,176	93.53				
Invalid/blank votes	197,708	6.47				
Total votes	3,053,884	100.00				
Registered voters/turnout	3,367,787	90.68				
Source: Nohlen
