= Wolfgang Larrazábal =

President of Venezuela in 1958

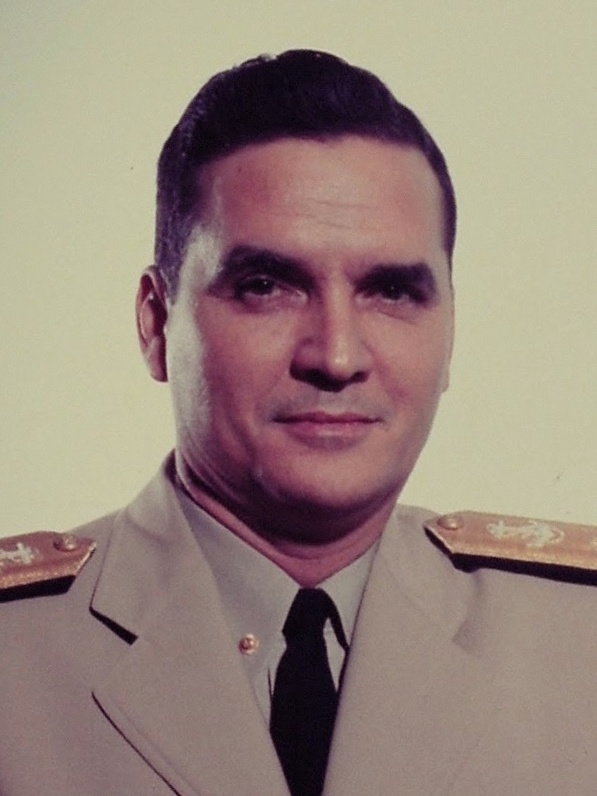
- Larrazábal, c. 1958

43rd President of Venezuela
- In office 23 January 1958 – 14 November 1958
- Preceded by: Marcos Pérez Jiménez
- Succeeded by: Edgar Sanabria (acting)

Personal details
- Born: Wolfgang Enrique Larrazábal Ugueto; 5 March 1911 Carúpano, Sucre state, Venezuela
- Died: 27 February 2003 (aged 91) Caracas, Venezuela
- Party: Democratic Republican Union, Popular Democratic Front
- Spouse: Mercedes María Peláez (died 2002)
- Children: 5

Military service
- Allegiance: Venezuela
- Branch/service: Venezuelan Navy
- Years of service: 1932–1958
- Rank: Rear admiral

Rear Admiral Wolfgang Enrique Larrazábal Ugueto (Spanish pronunciation: [ˈwɔlfɡaŋ(k) laraˈsaβal]; 5 March 1911 – 27 February 2003) was a Venezuelan naval officer and politician. He served as President of Venezuela following the overthrow of Marcos Pérez Jiménez in the 23 January 1958 Venezuelan coup d'état, stepping down later that year.

== Biography ==
=== Early life ===
Larrazábal was born on 5 March 1911 in Carúpano. He attended the Colegio Libertador in Maracaibo. Described by Time as "the well-mannered scion of an old naval family", Larrazábal enrolled in the Military Academy of the Bolivarian Navy in 1928.

=== Military career ===
Larrazábal was commissioned into the Bolivarian Navy of Venezuela in 1932. In 1938 to 1939, Larrazábal joined the frigate ARA Presidente Sarmiento on a voyage to circumnavigate the world. He completed a naval command course at the Naval War College in Newport, Rhode Island in the United States. In 1945, he was named assistant director of the Military Academy of the Bolivarian Navy. From 1949 to 1952, he served as naval attaché in the Embassy of Venezuela, Washington, D.C., by which time he held the rank of captain. In 1952, he was appointed president of the National Sports Institute. In 1955, Larrazábal was appointed director of the Caracas Military Circle. In July of that year, he served as a judge for the Miss World 1955 pageant which took place in Caracas.

In July 1957, Larrazábal was promoted to rear admiral and named chief of staff of the Bolivarian Navy of Venezuela. In January 1958, he was named supreme commander of the Navy by president Marcos Pérez Jiménez, making him Venezuela's highest ranking military officer. At this time, Larrazábal was known as "a quiet man, more a conformist than a conspirator".

=== Presidency ===
After popular unrest and a general strike broke out, on 22 January 1958 Larrazábal wrote to Pérez on behalf of the Venezuelan chiefs of staff demanding his resignation. After Pérez fled the country, Larrazábal became president of Venezuela on 23 January 1958 as the head of a military junta, the Junta Militar de Gobierno, comprising himself, colonel Roberto Cassanova, colonel Pedro Quevedo, colonel Carlo Araque, and colonel Romero Villate. On 26 January, in response to public pressure, he expanded the junta to a seven-member group, adding industrialist Eugenio Mendoza and academic Blas Lamberti. After taking power, Larrazábal promised to hold free elections as soon as possible and guaranteed political freedoms and foreign investments. He became "very popular among average Venezuelans for his folksy charisma, populist political views, and the generous welfare benefits offered under his government." Larrazábal's government increased the tax on oil profits from 50% (the rate set in 1946) to 60%, angering the petroleum industry. The United States initially regarded Larrazábal's government as having "moderate conservative and strong pro-American tendencies".

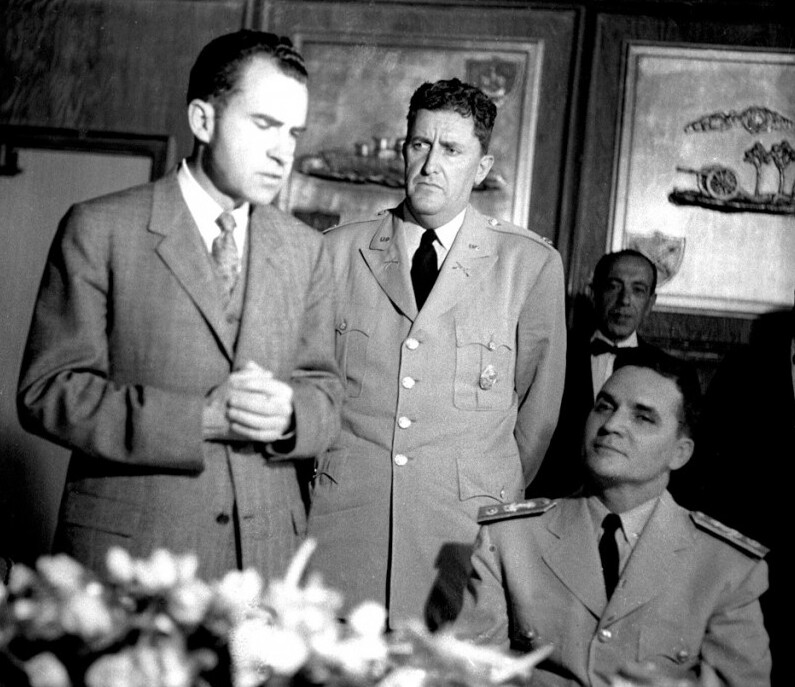
Larrazábal (seated right) meeting with US vice president Richard Nixon in May 1958.

In May 1958, United States vice president Richard Nixon's motorcade was attacked while he visited Venezuela; in response, Larrazábal pledged that the Nixon party would be "protected fully" thereafter. After Nixon's departure from Venezuela, Larrazábal declined to condemn the attack, saying that he would have joined the protests if he were a student.

In June 1958, Time noted that Larrazábal "has gone perplexingly out of his way to be kind to Communists", quoting Larrazábal as having said: "Maybe I am naïve. But I feel our Communism is a different Communism. Because of his rich patriotic heritage, no Venezuelan would accept orders from abroad." Larrazábal supported Fidel Castro in the Cuban Revolution by facilitating the supply of weapons to Castro's forces in the Sierra Maestra as well as providing a haven for the Cuban government-in-exile.

On 5 July 1958, army general Jesús María Castro León was appointed Minister of Defence. Upon his appointment, he presented Larrazábal with a note of grievances against the junta, which was interpreted as an ultimatum. On 23 July, a plot to kidnap Larrazábal was uncovered. After the plot was foiled, on 24 July Castro resigned and went into exile in Curaçao. In September 1958, Larrazábal survived a second coup attempt.

In September 1958, Larrazábal met with residents of 23 de Enero who were calling for rent reductions. Subsequently, the Banco Obrero reduced rents and expanded its mortgage program. In October 1958, Larrazábal's government approved the construction of El Helicoide after its developers agreed to hire a large number of unemployed people for the project.

In October 1958, Larrazábal was amongst the signatories of the Puntofijo Pact, which saw all the main political parties in Venezuela commit to respecting the outcome of the 7 December 1958 Venezuelan general election. Larrazábal resigned on 14 November 1958, to run in the general election; he was succeeded by Edgar Sanabria as interim president. He was formally supported by the Democratic Republican Union and the Communist Party of Venezuela; he was also covertly supported by the Soviet Union. By this time, the United States did not wish to see Larrazábal elected and tacitly supported his rivals, former president Rómulo Betancourt of the Democratic Action Party and Rafael Caldera of Copei. Larrazábal ultimately lost to Betancourt, receiving 34.61% of the vote to Betancourt's 49.18%. Larrazábal defeated Betancourt by a five-to-one margin in Caracas, but performed more poorly in the rural vote. Following the election, Larrazábal made a "sportsmanlike concession of defeat"; after violent protests broke out, he appealed for the election results to be respected in addresses broadcast on television and radio.

=== Later life ===
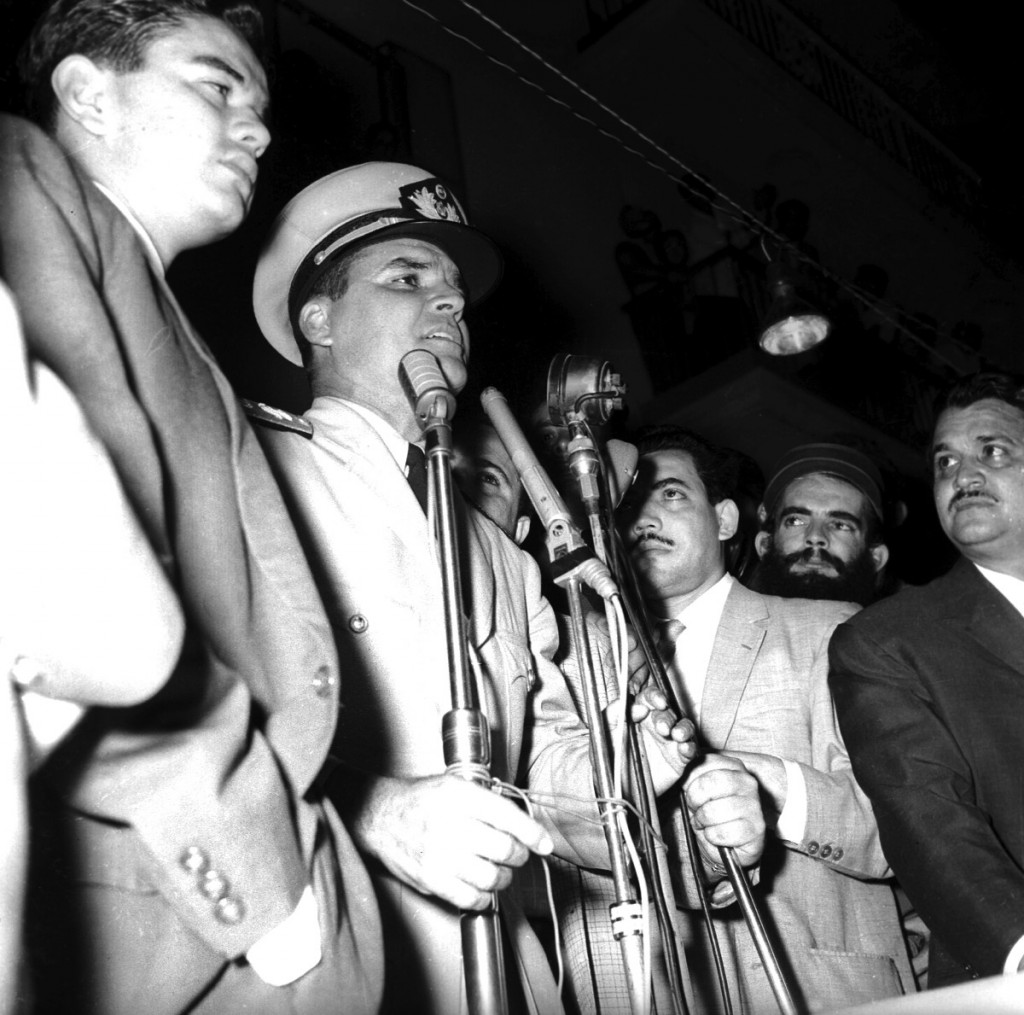
Larrazábal meeting with Fidel Castro in January 1959

In January 1959, Larrazábal met with Fidel Castro, who had been invited to Venezuela by the student government of the Central University of Venezuela to celebrate the anniversary of Pérez being deposed. During his visit, Castro expressed gratitude to Larrazábal for his support for the Cuban Revolution.

In 1959, Larrazábal was appointed as Ambassador of Venezuela to Chile, described by Time as "semi-exile". In 1962, during El Carupanazo, Larrazábal wrote to Betancourt from Chile assuring him that the Navy would never revolt against a democratically-elected government. His term as Ambassador ended in 1963. Forming a new party, the Popular Democratic Front (Jóvito Villalba having been selected as the candidate of the Democratic Republican Union), he stood for president in the 1963 Venezuelan general election but lost to Raúl Leoni of the Democratic Action Party, receiving 9.43% of the vote. He declined any position in Leoni's government.

From 1964 to 1969, Larrazábal served as a senator. In 1969, president Rafael Caldera appointed him Ambassador of Venezuela to Canada, a position he held until 1973. In 1973, Larrazábal supported the presidential campaign of Lorenzo Fernández. He served a second term as senator from 1974 to 1979.

Larrazábal died from respiratory failure on 27 February 2003 at the age of 91 in his home in Caracas.

== See also ==
- Presidents of Venezuela
- List of Venezuelans
- 1958 Venezuelan coup d'état
- Attack on Richard Nixon's motorcade

Political offices
Preceded by Marcos Pérez Jiménez	President of Venezuela; 1958	Succeeded by Edgar Sanabria; Interim
Party political offices
Preceded by None	URD presidential candidate 1958 (lost)	Succeeded by Jóvito Villalba
