= 1952 Venezuelan Constituent Assembly election =

Constituent Assembly elections were held in Venezuela on 30 November 1952. After the elections, it was planned that the Assembly would nominate a provisional president and then draft a new constitution. Although taking place under military dictatorship, with the main opposition party (Democratic Action) banned, the election was fair enough to permit early results showing an unexpected defeat for the ruling military junta as the Democratic Republican Union won 62.8% of the vote. The junta then blocked the final results from being published and installed General Marcos Pérez Jiménez as provisional President, an outcome confirmed by the Constituent Assembly, which the opposition parties boycotted.

== Background ==
Venezuela had been run by a three-person junta from the 1948 Venezuelan coup d'état, under the leadership of Carlos Delgado Chalbaud. His assassination in November 1950 caused delays in the promulgation of the junta's promised electoral law, and afterwards Pérez Jiménez, its most powerful member, opposed the draft law's enfranchisement of all persons over 18, describing it as enfranchising illiterates and minors. Perceived pressure of domestic and international opinion saw the electoral law published in April 1951.

== Campaign ==
The main party of the Venezuelan opposition and of the previous democratic government, Democratic Action, was banned and was specifically prohibited from participating. The Communist Party of Venezuela was also banned. In the absence of Democratic Action, the Democratic Republican Union (URD) was the most powerful opposition party. It seriously considered abstaining but ultimately decided to participate.

The opposition URD, led by Jóvito Villalba, and COPEI, led by Rafael Caldera, "had to furnish detailed information to the government regarding party-sponsored public meetings, membership rolls, and finances". In addition, press coverage of both parties was censored so strictly that it hardly communicated any more than movements of its leaders, with party policies simply omitted.

In the last weeks of the campaign, a parallel organization outside the political parties was organized to support Pérez Jiménez's push for the presidency; it was announced on 5 November that the "National Movement" had collected 1.6 million signatures in support. The movement became so prominent that the president of the Electoral Council reminded the country that it was electing a Constituent assembly, not a president.

== Results ==
Early returns, with around a third of the votes in, showed the URD on 147,065 votes, with the pro-junta FEI trailing with around 50,000 and COPEI finishing third. Pérez Jiménez ordered news coverage halted, and no further figures were announced until he declared final results on 2 December. Democratic Action in exile said that URD and COPEI had together won 1.6 million of 1.8 million votes cast, and 87 seats, and unofficial results published by Armando Veloz Mancera showed 1,198,000 votes for the URD, 403,000 for FEI and 306,000 for COPEI. Some details in state-level results support the charge of fraud. In some states the URD was entitled to one of two seats, based on its share of the official vote, but received none.

Party	Votes	%	Seats
Independent Electoral Front	788,031	44.11	59
Democratic Republican Union	638,063	35.71	29
Copei	300,159	16.80	14
Socialist Party of Venezuela	29,134	1.63	1
Socialist Workers' Party	14,305	0.80	0
Popular Republican Action	12,125	0.68	1
Independent Group (Zulia)	3,384	0.19	0
FERRI	1,355	0.08	0
Total	1,786,556	100.00	104
Source: Rondón Nucete, Lott

== Aftermath ==
After the results were announced the ruling junta resigned and handed power to the military, who named Pérez Jiménez Provisional President. The URD and COPEI boycotted the assembly's first meeting on 3 February. As a result, with only FEI members present, the assembly ratified the election results and formally elected Pérez Jiménez as President of Venezuela. Ultimately, the Assembly drafted a new constitution, which was promulgated in April 1953 and vested the president with sweeping powers to act to protect national security, peace, and order. For all intents and purposes, the document transformed Pérez Jiménez's presidency into a legal dictatorship.
