= 1958 Venezuelan general election =

- 7 December 1958
- Presidential election
- Registered: 2,913,801
- Turnout: 93.42%
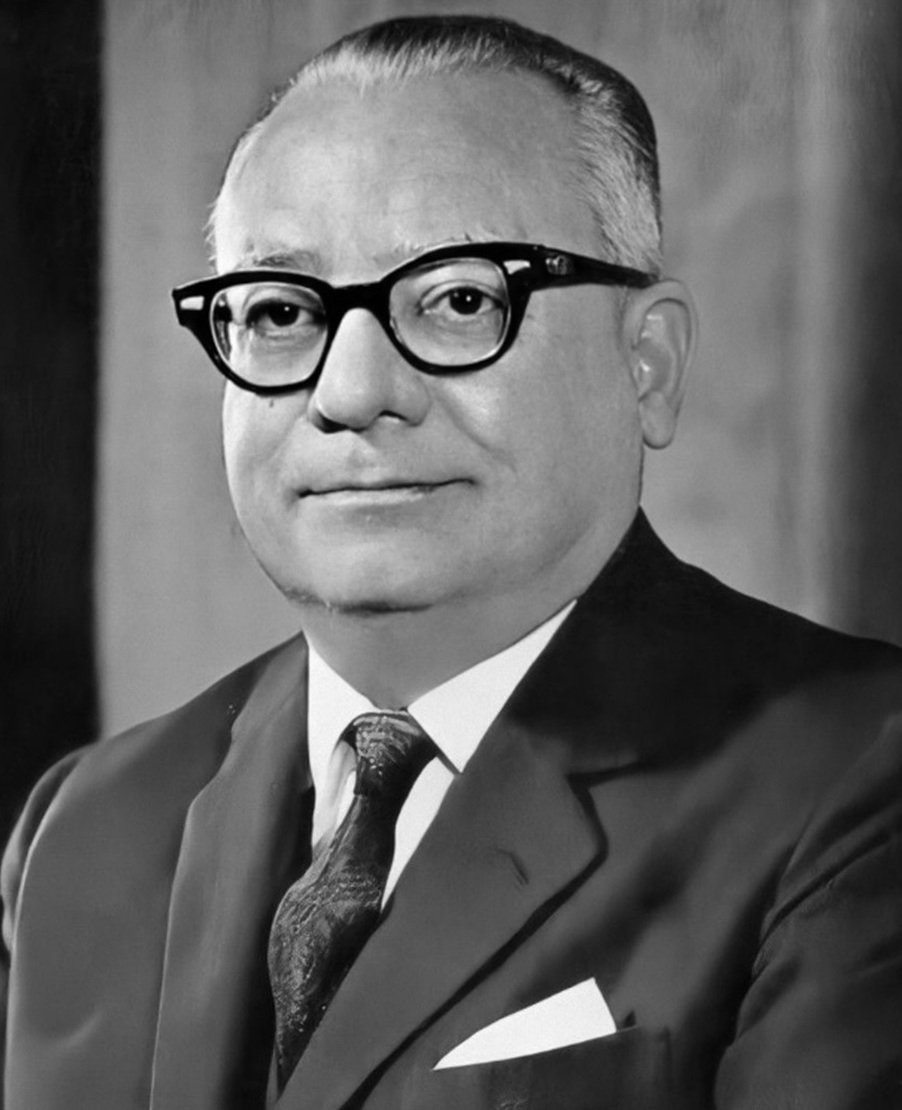

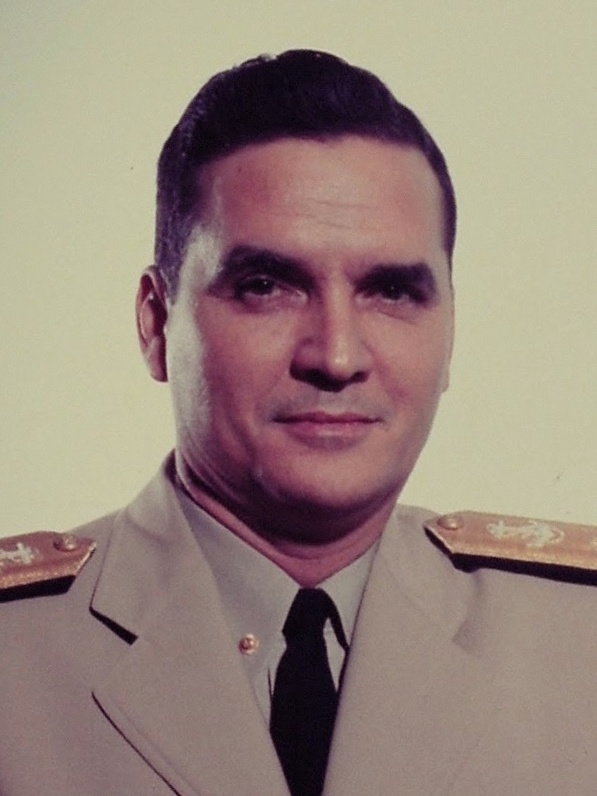

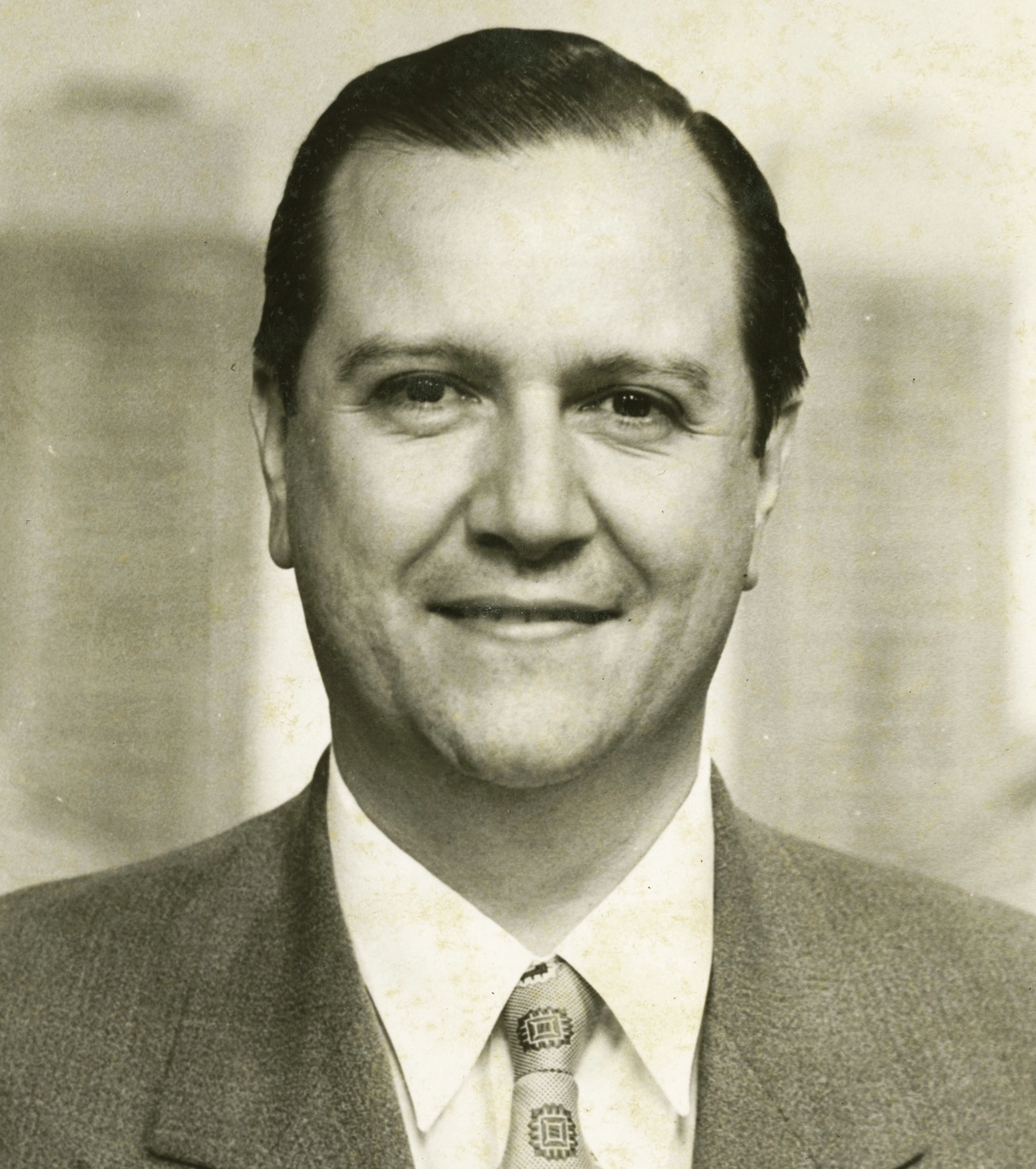
Candidate	Rómulo Betancourt	Wolfgang Larrazábal	Rafael Caldera
Party	Democratic Action	URD–PCV	Copei
Popular vote	1,284,092	903,479	423,262
Percentage	49.18%	34.61%	16.21%
- Results by state
President before election
Edgar Sanabria
Independent
Elected President
Rómulo Betancourt
Democratic Action

General elections were held in Venezuela on 7 December 1958. They were the first elections held after the overthrow of military ruler Marcos Pérez Jiménez earlier that year, and only the second free regular elections in the country's history.

The presidential elections were won by Rómulo Betancourt of Democratic Action, who received 49% of the vote, whilst his party won 73 of the 132 seats in the Chamber of Deputies and 32 of the 51 seats in the Senate. Voter turnout was 93% in the presidential election and 92% in the Congressional elections.

The Soviet Union covertly supported Wolfgang Larrazábal, who had led the coup against Pérez Jiménez and briefly served as provisional president, in the elections.

== Results ==
=== President ===
Candidate	Party	Votes	%
Rómulo Betancourt	Democratic Action	1,284,092	49.18
Wolfgang Larrazábal	URD–PCV–MENI	903,479	34.61
Rafael Caldera	Copei–IR–PST	423,262	16.21
Total		2,610,833	100.00
Valid votes		2,610,833	95.91
Invalid/blank votes		111,220	4.09
Total votes		2,722,053	100.00
Registered voters/turnout		2,913,801	93.42
Source: Nohlen

=== Congress ===
Party	Votes	%	Seats			
Party	Votes	%	Chamber	+/–	Senate	+/–
Democratic Action	1,275,973	49.45	73	–10	32	–6
Democratic Republican Union	690,357	26.76	34	+30	11	+10
Copei	392,305	15.20	18	+2	6	+2
Communist Party of Venezuela	160,791	6.23	7	+4	2	+1
Republican Integration	19,424	0.75	0	New	0	New
Socialist Workers' Party	15,476	0.60	0	New	0	New
Independent National Electoral Movement	14,908	0.58	0	New	0	New
Socialist Party of Venezuela	10,983	0.43	0	0	0	0
Total	2,580,217	100.00	132	+22	51	+5
Valid votes	2,580,217	96.10				
Invalid/blank votes	104,732	3.90				
Total votes	2,684,949	100.00				
Registered voters/turnout	2,913,801	92.15				
Source: Nohlen
