= Copei =

Political party in Venezuela

COPEI
- Leader: Juan Carlos Alvarado (ad-hoc); Roberto Enríquez (de jure)
- Secretary-General: Juan Carlos Alvarado (ad-hoc); Robert García (de jure)
- Founder: Rafael Caldera
- Founded: 13 January 1946
- Headquarters: Avenida La Gloria, El Bosque, Caracas
- Youth wing: Juventud Demócrata Cristiana
- Ideology: Social conservatism Christian democracy Economic liberalism
- Political position: Centre to centre-right
- National affiliation: Democratic Alliance
- Regional affiliation: Christian Democrat Organization of America
- International affiliation: Centrist Democrat International
- Colors: Dark green (customary); Lime green
- National Assembly: 1 / 285
- States' Governors: 0 / 23
- Mayors: 6 / 337

Website
- copei.org.ve

COPEI, also referred to as the Social Christian Party (Spanish: Partido Socialcristiano) or Green Party (Spanish: Partido Verde), is a Christian democratic party in Venezuela. The acronym stands for Comité de Organización Política Electoral Independiente (English: Independent Political Electoral Organization Committee), but this provisional full name has fallen out of use. The party was influential during the twentieth century as a signatory of the Puntofijo Pact and influenced many politicians throughout Latin America at its peak.

== History ==
=== Pre-Copei ===
The Federación de Estudiantes de Venezuela (FEV) met in the National Theatre of Venezuela on 6 May 1936, and its leadership issued a statement against the Catholic Church and called for the Jesuits to be expelled from Venezuela. Jóvito Villalba, the leader of the FEV, called for President Eleazar López Contreras to close all religious seminaries and convents and enforce laws providing for secular education. Rafael Caldera rose in opposition to these statements and was supported by Lorenzo Fernández, Lara Peña, Pérez Machado, Eduardo López de Ceballos, and Francisco Alfonzo Ravard. These dissenters received Catholic educations and were aligned with the Catholic Church.

A group of students met in Caldera's house and formed the Unión Nacional Estudiantil (UNE). The organisation stated that it would make no distinction in religion or politics except for its rejection of communism. López was supported by the UNE.

Caldera, Peña, Fernández, Víctor Giménez Landínez, and others were taught social philosophy by Manuel Aguirre, a Catholic priest.

Acción Electoral and Acción Nacional were founded by UNE members. Acción Electoral focused on municipal elections in Caracas and three of its candidates were elected to the municipal council in December 1938. Caldera and Peña were elected to the Chamber of Deputies. Acción Nacional, a fusion of Acción Electoral and the Movimiento de Acción Nacionalista, was formed by Caldera in April 1942. Caldera and Peña were the only elected members of Acción Nacional and the party ceased to exist after they left office in 1945.

=== Foundation ===
The government was overthrown in 1945. Members of the UNE, Acción Electoral, and Acción Nacional formed the Comité de Organización Electoral (CIE) in 1945. On 13 January 1946, CIE was reorganised into the Comite de Organizacion Politica Electoral Independiente (Copei). Caldera initially supported the new government and was made attorney general. However, he resigned on 13 April 1946 after protesting an attempt by the AD to break up a Christian democratic organisation's meeting in Táchira. Copei held its first national convention in September.

Copei won the second-largest number of seats in the 1946 Constituent Assembly election. Caldera placed second as Copei's nominee in the 1947 presidential election.

=== Dictatorship ===
Venezuela was led by a military dictatorship from 1948 to 1958. Copei was a political party from 1948 to 1952, but was then in exile until the end of the dictatorship. Copei's right-wing led by Goméz Mora and Barrios Mora wanted to become a part of the dictatorship's government while the labour leaders and students wanted to oppose the dictatorship. Caldera, Fernández, Edecio La Riva, Pedro Del Corral, Miguel Angel Landáez, and Giménez supported a policy of gradually moving Copei's position on the government from neutrality to opposition.

Oppression by the government increased after the assassination of President Carlos Delgado Chalbaud in 1950. Caldera was arrested in 1951, and then placed under permanent surveillance. New electoral laws restricted political parties and left Copei and Democratic Republican Union (URD) as the only major opposition parties for the 1952 Constituent Assembly election. The results released by the government showed Copei in third place behind the URD and Independent Electoral Front, but the results released by Copei showed them in second placed behind the URD. Copei and URD boycotted the Constituent Assembly meetings in 1953, which selected Marcos Pérez Jiménez as president.

Caldera went into exile in 1957 after being sent to prison twice.

The Patriotic Junta was formed by Copei, AD, URD, and the Communist Party of Venezuela (PCV) in June 1957. This organisation was dedicated to overthrowing the military dictatorship. Elections were meant to be held in 1957 before Pérez's term ended in 1958, but the government held a plebiscite with Pérez as the only candidate. Pérez won the plebiscite, but the results were rejected by the Patriotic Junta and his government was overthrown by a coup d'état on 23 January 1958.

A provisional government with Wolfgang Larrazábal as president was formed on 25 January 1958. Elections were held in 1958, and Caldera placed third in the presidential election while Copei held the third-largest number of seats in the Senate and Chamber of Deputies.

=== 1950s and 1960s ===
Copei, AD, and URD signed the Puntofijo Pact in October 1958, establishing themselves as the dominant political parties in the country. Signatories and supporters of the Pact stated that it was created to preserve democracy and to share governorship between parties. Critics believed that the Pact allowed signing parties to limit control over Venezuela's government to themselves. URD would later leave the pact in 1962 following Cuba's removal from the Organization of American States, leaving governing of Venezuela to COPEI and AD. The Puntofijo system ultimately created a network of patronage for both parties.

President Rómulo Betancourt's cabinet had three Copei members or allies with Fernández as Minister of Development, Giménez as Minister of Agriculture, and Andrés Aguilar Mawdsley as Minister of Justice.

AD and Copei formed a coalition in the 1960s that had Raúl Leoni as president of the Senate and Caldera as president of the Chamber of Deputies. Both men stepped down in 1962 in order to focus on their political parties. The Revolutionary Left Movement (MRI) and dissident AD members (ARS) broke away from AD and formed a coalition with URD and PCV. This new coalition held control over the Chamber of Deputies while the AD and Copei coalition had a 27 to 24 control over the Senate for the rest of Betancourt's term.

Caldera wanted to continue Copei's coalition with AD for the 1963 election, but more radical members of Copei did not want to be under another AD president. Copei put forward the idea of Caldera being the coalition's presidential nominee, but AD rejected this. Betancourt offered to let Copei to choose one of the candidates selected by AD, but this was rejected. Leoni was given AD's presidential nomination while Caldera was given Copei's presidential nomination. Caldera placed second behind Leoni, who won with a pluarity of 32%.

=== Presidency ===
AD suffered a schism in 1967. Dissident AD members broke and formed the People's Electoral Movement (MEP) and nominated Luis Beltrán Prieto Figueroa for president. Copei formed a coalition with the Independent Democratic Movement (MDI) and independents led by Pedro Tinoco gave their support to Copei's presidential nominee Caldera. Industrialist Eugenio Mendoza made significant financial contributions to Copei during the campaign and Miguel Ángel Capriles, who owned a large newspaper company, supported Copei in exchange for a seat in the senate and his brother being appointed ambassador to Canada. Caldera won the election with a plurality of the vote.

Copei had to select somebody to replace Caldera as secretary general at its 11th national convention in August 1969. Caldera suffered a defeat as his candidate, Godofredo González, placed third behind Arístides Beaujon. In 1970, Adolfo Melchert, who was supported by Caldera's faction, was elected national secretary, but only after a tied vote and Caldera personally calling for the national committee to select a candidate.

=== 21st century ===
With the election of Chávez, Venezuela entered into a period of a dominant-party system led by his United Socialist Party of Venezuela (PSUV). In the 2000 legislative elections COPEI won a meager five of 165 seats in the National Assembly, with the party receiving 5.10% of valid votes. In the 2005 legislative elections COPEI staged an electoral boycott and did not win any seats in the National Assembly. In the 2010 parliamentary election, COPEI was part of the broad oppositional Coalition for Democratic Unity and won eight of the 165 seats.

Prior to the 2015 Venezuelan parliamentary election, the pro-government Supreme Tribunal of Justice designated new leaders of COPEI, leading some to state that the party was infiltrated by the PSUV. By 2017, Caracas Chronicles said the party was "dying an undignified death" as infighting among leaders could not agree on a path for the party.

== Newspapers ==
COPEI was the first newspaper for the party, but it was replaced by El Gráfico, which was founded and directed by Angel, in June 1947. El Gráfico was shut down from 21 to 25 November 1948 in the midst of constitutional restrictions by President Rómulo Gallegos and the coup d'état. The paper was suspended multiple times by Venezuela's dictatorship in the 1950s and Herrera was imprisoned for writing articles that criticised the government.

Triángulo de Información Europa-Las Américas (TEILA) was formed by exiled Copei members in Santiago, Spain in July 1953, and copies were smuggled into Venezuela. This newspaper later moved to Rome and was directed by Herrera and Guido Diaz Peña.

== Political positions ==
Copei threatened to leave Betancourt's government if he established diplomatic relations with the Soviet Union.

== Presidents of Venezuela ==
№	Portrait	President (Birth–Death)	State	Term of office	Term
39		Rafael Caldera (1916–2009)	Yaracuy	11 March 1969 – 12 March 1974	28 (1968)
41		Luis Herrera Campins (1925–2007)	Portuguesa	12 March 1979 – 2 February 1984	30 (1978)

== See also ==
- List of political parties in Venezuela
- Interventions of political parties in Venezuela

== Works cited ==
- Herman, Donald (1980). Christian Democracy in Venezuela. University of North Carolina Press. ISBN 0807814253.
