= Jóvito Villalba =

Venezuelan politician (1908–1989)

- Signers of Punto Fijo Pact, from left to Right: Rafael Caldera, Jóvito Villalba and Rómulo Betancourt

Personal details
- Born: March 23, 1908 Pampatar, Nueva Esparta
- Died: July 8, 1989 (aged 81) Caracas, Venezuela
- Spouse(s): Elsa Vera Fortique (Div.); Ismenia Villalba
- Profession: lawyer, politician

Jóvito Rafael Villalba Gutiérrez (Pampatar, March 23, 1908 – Caracas, July 8, 1989) was a constitutional law professor and Venezuelan politician, considered one of the key participants in the construction of Venezuelan democracy in the 20th century and one of the leading Latin American orators of his generation. Villalba stood out among the opposition representatives during the military governments of the Andean hegemony and the Pérez Jiménez regime, eventually serving as the secretary general of the liberal-leaning Unión Republicana Democrática party.

== Biography ==
=== Early years and beginning of political career ===
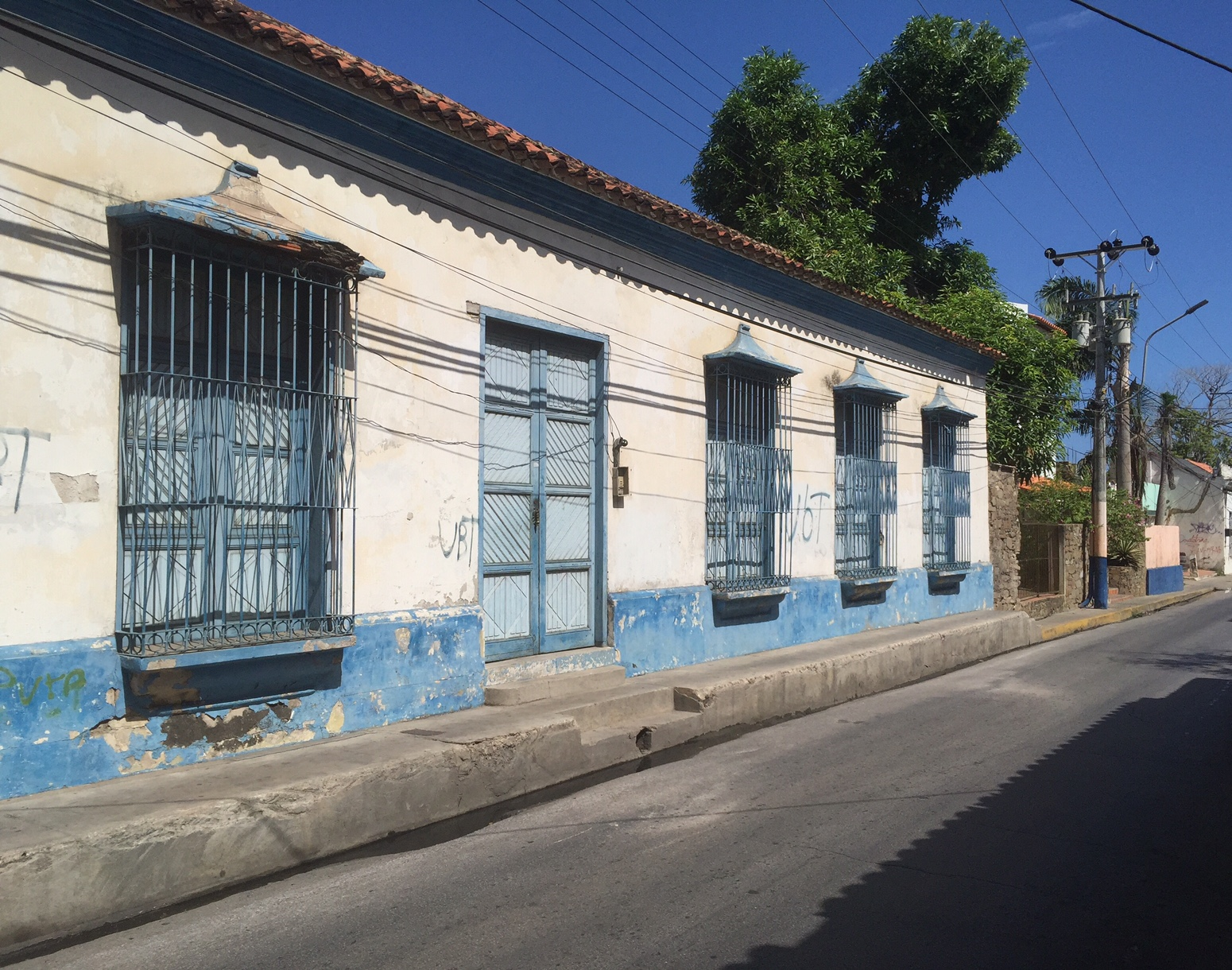
Birthplace of Jóvito Villalba.

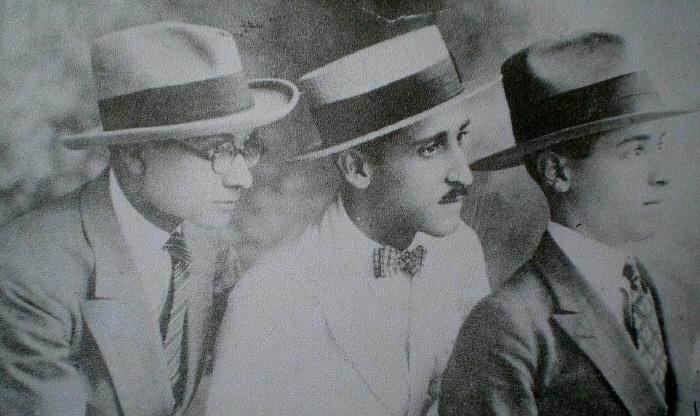
Rómulo Betancourt, Joaquín Gabaldón Márquez, and Jóvito Villalba in 1928

On February 6, 1928, during Student Week, Villalba delivered a speech at the National Pantheon against the dictatorship of Juan Vicente Gómez that made him famous.

Before the free conscience of America arises, whole and burning with strength, in the cry of a unanimous protest, the same ideal of Latin American fraternity that a hundred years earlier fit easily in the visionary gaze of the Liberator. In the lands of Venezuela the time of the hero has once again sounded like a toll for this glorious tomb in the restlessness of us, which is the restlessness of the gesture that is to come. Liberator, the time has once again come for your action to coincide for us in this moment of defining ourselves before destiny and before ourselves. Speak, O father, before the university, where the homeland was forged years ago and your rebellious voice of San Jacinto may be heard once again.

— Jóvito Villalba, Speech at the National Pantheon, 1928.

Villalba took part in the famous coup at San Carlos on April 7, 1928. In 1929 he was arrested and imprisoned in La Rotunda prison. A year later he was sent to San Felipe Castle in Puerto Cabello, where he spent six years. He used his time in prison to study English, French, German, and other subjects with his fellow inmates, effectively creating a “school” for illiterate prisoners. In 1934 he was exiled to Trinidad, where he remained until 1936, when after Gómez's death he was pardoned by Eleazar López Contreras. Villalba was the first of all the political exiles to return to Venezuela. He was one of the signatories of the Plan of Barranquilla of 1931.

Throughout his life and amid the vicissitudes of his political career, Dr. Villalba was a professor of Constitutional Law at the Faculty of Law of the Central University of Venezuela and of other subjects in the Schools of Economics and Journalism.

=== Leader of the URD party ===
Together with Rómulo Betancourt and other leaders, he founded the National Democratic Party (PDN), which later split. He was expelled again, and when he returned, he remained independent, resumed his studies, and finally graduated as a lawyer in 1943. On December 10, 1945, he founded the Unión Republicana Democrática (URD), a party of liberal, democratic, and nationalist tendencies, as he defined it. He was arrested during the Trienio Adeco in December 1946 and released in January 1947.

In 1952, he participated with his party in the elections to form the National Constituent Assembly. The elections were held on December 2, 1952, organized by the ruling Military Junta. The first partial results gave URD a wide majority of votes. After a long silence during the process, an announcement was made at 8:00 p.m. by Marcos Pérez Jiménez of the pro-government Frente Electoral Independiente (FEI), stating that the Military Junta had resigned and that Pérez Jiménez had been appointed provisional president. These elections were considered fraudulent by the political opposition to Pérez Jiménez. Three parties participated in them: the ruling FEI, COPEI, and URD. The National Electoral Council resigned in response to this fraud. Jovito Villalba was summoned to a meeting that turned out to be an ambush, and he was expelled from the country.

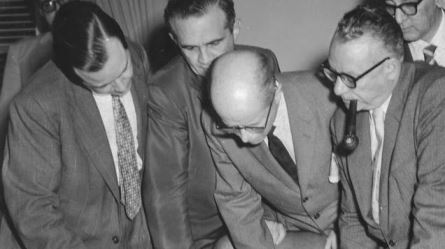
Rafael Caldera, Jóvito Villalba and Rómulo Betancourt meeting at the apartment of Ignacio Luis Arcaya in New York City.

In 1957, from exile, he was one of the promoters of the Patriotic Junta created in Caracas. In 1958, he became one of the main signatories of the Puntofijo Pact, which laid the foundation for the nascent democratic system. In the elections of the same year, he was elected deputy, while his party supported the candidacy of Wolfgang Larrazábal, who came in second place behind Rómulo Betancourt. In the 1963 elections, he ran for the Presidency of the Republic for the first time, obtaining 551,266 votes (third place, with 18.87% of the votes). In the 1973 elections, he again ran for president but obtained a lower percentage of votes than in 1963.

== See also ==
- Political prisoners in Venezuela

Party political offices
Preceded by Wolfgang Larrazábal (1958)	URD presidential candidate 1963 (lost)	Succeeded by Miguel Ángel Burelli Rivas (1968)
