= Puntofijo Pact =

1958 power-sharing arrangement between Venezuela's three main political parties

Punto Fijo Pact
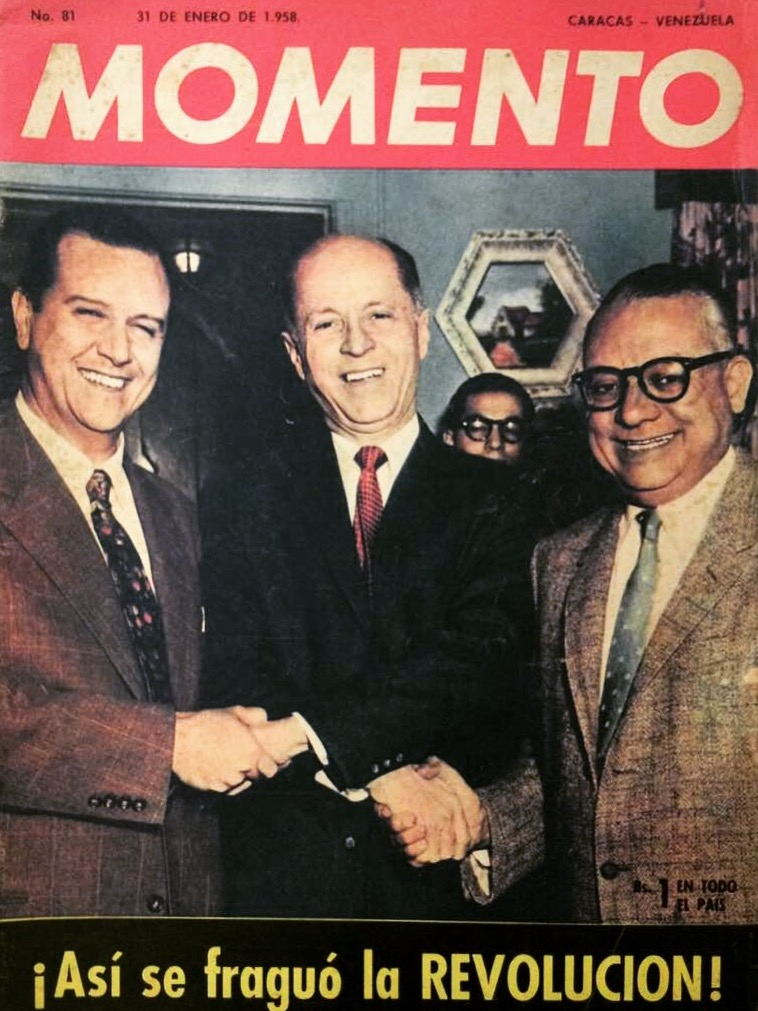
- 1958 magazine cover featuring the leading signatories of the Pact from left to right: Rafael Caldera, Jóvito Villalba, and Rómulo Betancourt.
- Signed: 31 October 1958
- Location: Puntofijo Residence, Francisco Solano López Avenue, Sabana Grande, Caracas, Venezuela
- Parties: Acción Democrática; COPEI; Unión Republicana Democrática

Full text
- Punto Fijo Pact at Wikisource

The Puntofijo Pact was a formal arrangement arrived at between representatives of Venezuela's three main political parties in 1958, Acción Democrática (AD), COPEI (Social Christian Party), and Unión Republicana Democrática (URD), for the acceptance of the 1958 presidential elections and the preservation of the new democratic system. The pact was a written guarantee that the signing parties would respect the election results, prevent single-party hegemony, share power, and collaborate to prevent dictatorship.

The Puntofijo pact is often credited with launching Venezuela towards democracy, being recognized for creating the most stable period in the republican history of Venezuela. While it provided the grounds for possible democratic deepening, it has also been criticized for enabling an inflexible two-party system between AD and COPEI.

== Background ==
On January 23, 1958, President Marcos Pérez Jiménez fled Venezuela for the Dominican Republic and a group of military leaders took control of the country. The presidency of Pérez Jiménez was a dictatorship that relied heavily on oil revenues to pay for a massive urbanization and modernization campaign in the cities of Venezuela. The United States supported the government of Venezuela because it was a reliable oil source.

Following Pérez Jiménez's ouster, the three major parties in the country — COPEI, AD, and the URD — came together to ensure a lasting democracy in Venezuela, a country that had been under dictatorial rule for nearly all of its history since gaining independence in 1830.

The parties were aware that if one of them disputed the results of the pending election, it would only harm the country given the economic instability and volatility that had resulted from the declining oil prices and post-coup atmosphere. The pact was a way for the parties to ensure cooperation and compliance with election results. This would allow for the transition to democracy.

== Signing and results ==
The pact was signed in, and named after, the residence of COPEI leader Rafael Caldera in Caracas, by representatives of the URD, COPEI, and AD. Its adherents claimed the pact was aimed at preserving Venezuelan democracy by respecting elections, by having the winners of the elections consider including members of the signing parties and others in positions of power in bids for national unity governments, and by having a basic shared program of government. They guaranteed, for example, the continuation of obligatory military service; improved salaries, housing, and equipment for the military.

Three members of each party signed the pact. These men included Rómulo Betancourt of AD, Rafael Caldera of COPEI, and Jóvito Villalba of the URD. Both Betancourt and Caldera would go on to become presidents of Venezuela. The pact served to deepen democracy in the region in that it ensured respect of the democratic process of the election. This allowed for the uncontested democratic election of Rómulo Betancourt, and Betancourt would go on for the first time in the Venezuelan history of the 20th century to finish the tenure of a government elected by universal suffrage.

In 1962, URD refused to sign the Costa Rica agreement, which excluded Cuba from the Inter-American system. The decision was accompanied by the immediate withdrawal of the tripartite coalition in the government of Rómulo Betancourt.

== Deterioration ==
COPEI and AD became increasingly reliant on the shared oil revenues to secure their power over Venezuelan politics through a system of patronage politics and clientelism, and the bipartisanship began to deteriorate in the 1980s as oil revenues took a sharp decline. This led to increasing public distrust of the legitimacy of the AD and COPEI, and what began as democratic deepening began to deteriorate. More formal opposition emerged in the late 1980s. One of the first indicators of public unrest was on the Caracazo on 27 February 1989, where there were riots due to a sharp and sudden increase in the prices of public transportation and gas. In the 1993 presidential elections the former leader of COPEI, Rafael Caldera, was elected president under a different party, Convergencia. Presidential candidate Hugo Chávez ran on a platform of attacking the AD and COPEI bipartisanship in his 1998 election campaign, promising to break the traditional system.

== See also ==
- Grand coalition
- Moncloa Pacts
- National Front (Colombia)
- National unity government
- Turno
- Uniparty
