= Democratic Republican Union =

Political party in Venezuela

Democratic Republican Union Unión Republicana Democrática
- Founder: Jóvito Villalba
- Founded: 18 December 1945
- Headquarters: Caracas
- Ideology: Liberalism; Social liberalism Civic nationalism Progressivism; Reformism
- Political position: Centre to centre-left
- Colours: Yellow

The Democratic Republican Union (Spanish: Unión Republicana Democrática, URD) is a Venezuelan political party founded in 1945.

== History ==
When the party appeared on course to win the 1952 election for a constituent assembly, then-dictator Marcos Pérez Jiménez suspended the election. The party joined in the 1958 Puntofijo Pact, and its candidate in that year's presidential election, Wolfgang Larrazábal, was the runner-up. The party resigned from the Puntofijo Pact in 1962 in protest of the decision to exclude Cuba from the Organization of American States, which ended its time as a dominant political party. Its candidate Jóvito Villalba won 19% of the vote in the 1963 election, but only 3% in the 1973 election.

== Presidential candidates supported ==
Elections where the URD backed the winning candidate shown in bold.

- 1952 election: Jóvito Villalba
- 1958 election: Wolfgang Larrazábal (34.88% of vote)
- 1963 election: Jóvito Villalba (18.89%)
- 1968 election: Miguel Ángel Burelli Rivas (22.22%)
- 1973 election: Jóvito Villalba (3.07%)
- **1978 election: Luis Herrera Campins** (COPEI candidate)
- **1983 election: Jaime Lusinchi** (Acción Democrática candidate)
- 1988 election: Ismenia Villalba (0.84%)
- **1993 election: Rafael Caldera** (independent, backed by a coalition of anti-COPEI/Acción Democrática parties)
- 1998 election: Luis Alfaro Ucero (0.60%)
- 2000 election:
- 2006 election: Manuel Rosales (A New Era candidate)
