= Argelia Laya =

Afro-Venezuelan women's rights activist and politician (1926–1997)

- Argelia Laya
- Born: Argelia Mercedes Laya López; 10 July 1926; San José del Río Chico, Venezuela
- Died: 27 November 1997 (aged 71); Caracas, Venezuela
- Other name: Comandanta Jacinta
- Occupations: Schoolteacher, women's rights activist, guerilla fighter, politician

Argelia Laya (10 July 1926 – 27 November 1997) was an Afro-Venezuelan schoolteacher, women's rights activist, guerrilla fighter, and politician. A supporter of women's labor, legal, and reproductive rights, as well as various forms of left-wing politics, she was a founding member of the Movement for Socialism (Spanish: Movimiento al Socialismo, MAS), the first woman to serve as its secretary general, and, when she became the party's president in 1990, the first woman to serve as the president of a political party in Venezuela.

Born in San José de Río Chico (now San José de Barlovento), Laya attended the Miguel Antonio Caro Normal School, where she participated in numerous extracurriculars and created a national plan for equality in education. She became a schoolteacher and, after the 1945 Venezuelan coup d'état, was assigned to carry out a literacy campaign in La Guaira State. When dictator Marcos Pérez Jiménez came to power following the 1948 Venezuelan coup d'état, she helped organize opposition to his regime while studying philosophy and the education sciences at the Pedagogical Institute of Caracas. She graduated in 1955 and taught mental health classes at a private high school.

During the 1950s, Laya joined the Communist Party of Venezuela (Spanish: Partido Comunista de Venezuela, PCV), helping to organize resistance in the COTA 905 neighborhood of Caracas during the 1958 Venezuelan coup d'état, which overthrew Pérez Jiménez. After this coup, she was elected as a federal district councilor for Caracas and as an alternate deputy for the state of Miranda. Soon after, she joined the PCV's armed guerrilla wing, fighting in the mountains of Lara until 1964.

After helping found the MAS in 1971, Laya advocated for women within the organization through the MAS-linked Socialist Women organization. Throughout the 1980s, she advocated for women's rights in Venezuela and abroad, and in 1988, she unsuccessfully ran as the MAS candidate for governor of Miranda. Upon becoming the MAS party president, she helped set up a network of Municipal Women's Centers in cities across the country. After her death, numerous buildings and organizations were named after her. Many consider her to have been an important figure in the Venezuelan women's rights movement.

== Early life ==
Argelia Mercedes Laya López was born on the Las Mercedes cocoa plantation near the city of San José del Río Chico (now San José de Barlovento), Miranda, Venezuela, on 10 July 1926. Her mother, Rosario López, was a feminist community worker, poet, and musician. Her father, Pedro María Laya, was a colonel in the Venezuelan Army who participated in resistance against the governments of Cipriano Castro and Juan Vicente Gómez. The third of four children, Laya was often sick when she was young but showed a "proactive and determined attitude toward heroism", according to researcher José Pascual Mora García. She regularly engaged in tests of endurance with her brother, such as climbing poles, eating spicy food, jumping over fires, and stabbing herself with sharp objects. Mora García says that the "intellectual atmosphere of the student resistance" during the 1928 demonstrations against dictator Juan Vicente Gómez, which took place when Laya was one, influenced her "emancipated mindset".

Because of her sickly disposition, Laya began primary school later than most children. She taught herself to read using her brother's comic books. For most of her early education, Venezuela used a "Romanesque" system marked by the use of corporal punishment. Laya was an excellent student, and her fellow students considered her to be a skilled organizer. In 1936, her father died, casting her family into poverty. They moved to Caracas, where Laya continued her education at the Miguel Antonio Caro Normal School. She became the school's secretary of culture, director of the student newspaper, and general secretary of the Federation of Evangelical Youth. Later, she founded the First Center for Student Novelists and became a member of many other civic organizations, which brought her into contact with working-class Caraqueños (residents of Caracas). Aside from her extracurriculars, Laya also created a national plan for equality in education. In 1945, she graduated and became a normal school teacher at 19 years old.

== Teaching career ==
When Laya began teaching, the salaries of normal school teachers were among the lowest in Venezuela. Around this time, the nation was undergoing major reforms, as the government of Isaías Medina Angarita was overthrown by junior military officers working in concert with the left-wing Democratic Action party in the 1945 Venezuelan coup d'état. Laya initially wanted to teach in Guyana, but women were not allowed to teach there. She then made plans to teach in Santa Elena de Uairén but, because of a teacher shortage, was assigned to Zulia instead, where she earned Bs. 300 a month. In late 1945, Rómulo Betancourt of Democratic Action officially came to power as president of Venezuela and began instituting social reforms such as land redistribution and controls on oil companies. Laya was sent to the República de Panamá School in La Guaira State to carry out a literacy campaign.

In 1946, Laya co-founded the Organization of the National Union of Women, serving as its secretary. Around this time, she became pregnant. At the time, there was strong stigma against single mothers, particularly teachers, who were forbidden from teaching and often committed suicide or sought abortions. Despite this, she decided to continue with the pregnancy, writing a letter to the education minister, Luis Beltrán Prieto Figueroa, claiming her constitutional right to maternity regardless of her marital status. While she was still allowed to teach after this, she was suspended for several months for "immoral conduct", and when she returned, she was assigned to a lower-level school.

Soon after, Venezuelan society was transformed again by the 1948 Venezuelan coup d'état, which saw the ascent of a military junta that repressed organized labor groups and fired teachers sympathetic to the Democratic Action party. Around 1950, when junta member Marcos Pérez Jiménez became the country's de facto dictator, Laya withdrew from Democratic Action, citing its failure to organize clandestine campaigns against the dictatorship. She enrolled at the Pedagogical Institute of Caracas, studying philosophy and the education sciences. She also continued her organizing work despite the Pérez Jiménez regime's repression, forming the Women's Committee of the Patriotic Board, working with the Legion of Women Nationalists, delivering food to prisoners, organizing street protests, and advocating for women's reproductive rights, including the right to abortion and childcare. In 1952, she married Rafael Elino Martínez, about whom little is known. While she was temporarily suspended from the institute as a political reprisal for her organizing activity, she graduated in 1955 and began teaching mental health classes at a private high school.

== Communist Party activism ==
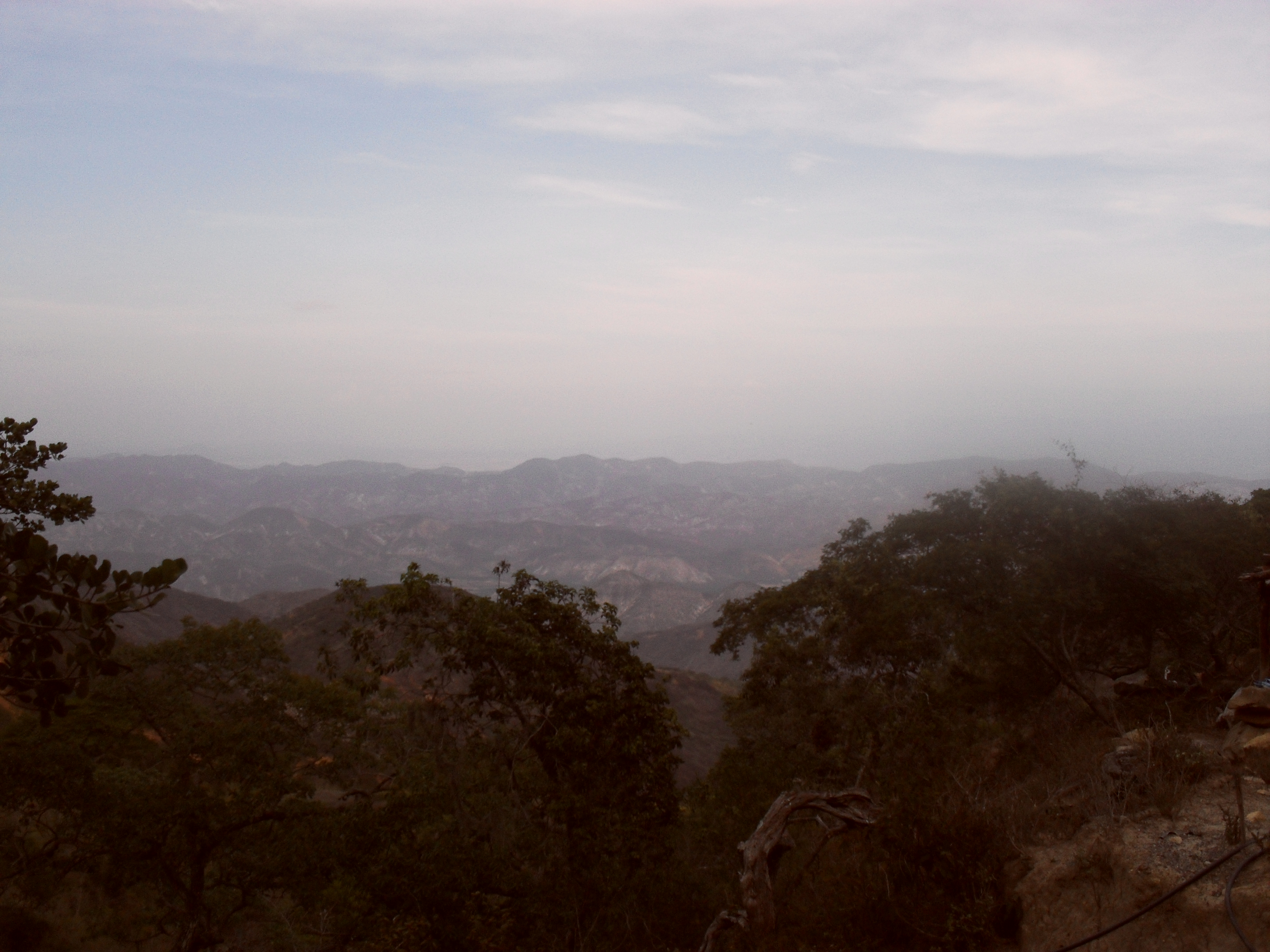
Laya fought for the Communist Party of Venezuela as a guerilla in the mountains of Lara State.

Laya joined the Communist Party of Venezuela (Spanish: Partido Comunista de Venezuela, PCV) some time during the 1950s. At the time, the PCV was known for its opposition to the Pérez Jiménez dictatorship and was growing in popularity, particularly in urban areas. During the 1958 Venezuelan coup d'état, which overthrew Pérez Jiménez, Laya organized a women's committee to support the organizers of the coup. On 22 January, she, armed with rusted weapons and Molotov cocktails, helped seize the "San Miguel" building in the COTA 905 neighborhood of Caracas. From there, she organized the community to support the coup, providing medical aid to protesters. After the coup, Laya ran in the 1958 Venezuelan general election. She was elected as a federal district councilor for Caracas and as an alternate deputy for the state of Miranda. In 1959, she attended the Latin American Women's Congress in Santiago, Chile.

That same year, after attending the congress, Laya joined the armed guerrilla wing of the PCV. The PCV organized these guerillas after being excluded from the Puntofijo Pact, an agreement between major Venezuelan political parties to respect democratic norms, and amidst degradation of public services, wage cuts, and repression of student protests in the early days of Betancourt second presidency, which began after his election in 1958. By 1963, these guerrilla forces had consolidated into the Armed Forces of National Liberation, (Note: Not to be confused with the Puerto Rican Armed Forces of National Liberation) a combined front against the government. Laya operated with the guerillas until 1964, taking the pseudonym "Comandanta Jacinta". She also became vice president of the First Congress of Venezuelan Women during the 1960s. In this position, she advocated for workplace protections for women and continued to advocate for women's reproductive rights.

== Movement for Socialism ==
In 1971, Laya was one of the founding members of the Movement for Socialism (Spanish: Movimiento al Socialismo, MAS), a group of dissidents led by Teodoro Petkoff who split from the PCV over its commitment to orthodox communism, its preoccupation with party discipline, and its alliances with more moderate political parties. In 1972, Laya helped found Socialist Women, an MAS-linked organization that promoted women's interests. Her husband, with whom she had three children, died in an accident around 1974. Around the mid-1970s, some men in the MAS began to oppose Socialist Women, which dissolved in 1977. Laya criticized the party's unwillingness to advocate for women, stating that "the Venezuelan path to socialism is pure blah-blah without work specifically directed at raising the consciousness of women". In 1979, Laya wrote an autobiography, Nuestra Causa (transl. 'Our Cause').

During the 1980s, Laya continued to work in support of women's rights. In 1980, while serving as an MAS federal district councilor, she introduced a resolution with the other women on the council calling for civil code reforms granting equal legal rights to women within the family and eliminating legal discrimination against children born out of wedlock. These reforms were passed in 1982. Later, in 1984, she became the first woman to be elected secretary general of the MAS. In 1985, she served on the Venezuelan delegation to the United Nations Third World Conference on Women. She also served as an advisor for the Organization of American States's Interamerican Women's Commission and the Transcultural Institute of Studies of Black Women, as well as working with the Coordination of Women's Non-Governmental Organizations (Spanish: Coordinación de Organizaciones No Gubernamentales de Mujeres, CONG) and the Integral Health Program of Women from the Gender Perspective.

=== Inés María Marcano case ===
As part of her work with the CONG, Laya advocated for a young single mother named Inés María Marcano, who was imprisoned for leaving her children at home alone to go to a party. While she was gone, thieves broke into Marcano's home and raped and murdered her daughter. The CONG argued that Marcano was a working-class woman without childcare living in an area with poor housing, public services, and police protection and that therefore she was a victim of circumstance. At a CONG press conference, Laya outlined the group's objections to Marcano's imprisonment, and later, she wrote the introduction to La Mujer y la Lucha Solidaria: En el caso de Inés María Marcano, Una en un millón (transl. 'A Woman and the Common Struggle: In the Case of Inés María Marcano, One in a Million'), a paper raising awareness for her case. After the CONG interviewed Marcano in prison, her campaign gained public support, and she was released by a superior court judge on 25 December 1987.

=== Party leadership ===
In 1988, Laya unsuccessfully ran as the MAS candidate for governor of Miranda. Later, in 1990, she was selected as president of the MAS. She was the first woman to serve as the president of a political party in Venezuela. As party president, she helped connect members of the Feminist League of Maracaibo with an MAS city councilor, convinced the council to financially sponsor the league's Municipal Women's Center, a feminist organizing space that provided health, legal, occupational, and psychological advice to women in the city, particularly poor women. Once the center proved successful, Laya promoted the creation of 32 similar centers in cities across the country.

== Later life and death ==
Laya attended the First Meeting to Discuss Women and Education in Bolivia in 1994, where she helped create the Program Educating for Equality, which aimed to eliminate sexism in education by including gender-related issues in curricula. However, by 1997, she was beginning to experience a number of health issues, including hypertension, peptic ulcer disease, and pleurisy, causing her to be sent to a nursing home. Despite this, she continued to remain active throughout the year, becoming the vice president of the United Nations Economic Commission for Latin America and the Caribbean, visiting her sister Renée in Northville, Michigan, and attending the MAS national convention, where she proposed a 30% minimum quota for women in party positions. She died in Caracas on 27 November 1997.

== Legacy ==
Many educational buildings have been named after Laya, including "Simoncito" early childhood education centers, (Note: Simoncito early childhood education centers were instituted by the Hugo Chávez government as part of its "Bolivarian Education" initiative.) elementary schools, high schools, and the University Argelia Laya Polytechnic in Miranda. The Central University of Venezuela also has an Argelia Laya Free Women's Chair. Other buildings that bear her name include a state-owned banana processing plant in Barlovento, a state-owned timber processing plant in Anzoátegui State, a Mission Barrio Adentro center, and a number of women's centers and shelters, including the Argelia Laya Autonomous Institute for Women in Libertador Municipality, Caracas. An organization named after Laya, the Argelia Laya Network, connects educators with students and civil society organizations to form ideas for state educational policies. Scholars such as Mora García and Juliet Montero Brito, as well as activists and journalists such as Alejandra Laprea and Aníbal Nazoa, consider her to have been an important figure in the Venezuelan women's rights movement.

== Sources ==
- Aranguren, Fernando (2018). "Las mujeres en la búsqueda de consenso hacia sus derechos" [Women in the search for consensus on their rights]. Memorias del I Encuentro Naranja 2018: Miradas por los derechos humanos de las mujeres en Venezuela [Memoirs of the First Orange Meeting 2018: Perspectives on Women's Human Rights in Venezuela] (Report). Caracas: Cepaz. pp. 64–74.
- Castro, Angela (2021). "Argelia Laya, una vida de lucha por los derechos de mujeres a la educación" [Argelia Laya, A Life of Struggle for Women's Rights to Education]. Venezolanos Ilustres (in Spanish).
- Cortina Orero, Eudald (2020). "Notes on the Guerilla Experience in Venezuela (1958-1995)". In Kruijt, Dirk; Tristán, Eduardo Rey; Álvarez, Alberto Martín (eds.). Latin American Guerrilla Movements: Origins, Evolution, Outcomes. New York: Routledge. pp. 45–53. ISBN 978-0-429-24406-3.
- Ellner, Steve (1988). Venezuela's Movimiento Al Socialismo: From Guerrilla Defeat to Innovative Politics. Durham; London: Duke University Press. ISBN 978-0-8223-0808-9.
- Ellner, Steve (1994). "The Deepening of Democracy in a Crisis Setting: Political Reform and the Electoral Process in Venezuela". Journal of Interamerican Studies and World Affairs. 35 (4): 1–42. doi:10.2307/165954. ISSN 0022-1937.
- Ewell, Judith (1991). "Venezuela since 1930". In Bethell, Leslie (ed.). The Cambridge History of Latin America. Cambridge University Press. doi:10.1017/chol9780521266529. ISBN 978-1-139-05524-6.
- Friedman, Elisabeth J. (2000). Unfinished Transitions: Women and the Gendered Development of Democracy in Venezuela, 1936-1996. University Park: Penn State University Press. ISBN 0-271-02023-7.
- Laprea, Alejandra (2021). "Argelia Laya: A Black Communist Woman Against the Tide". Capire.
- Mannarino, Carmen (2014). "Argelia Laya, por sobre todo humana" [Argelia Laya, Above All Human]. Nuestra causa [Our Cause] (PDF). By Laya, Argelia. Caracas: Herederos de Argelia Laya. ISBN 978-980-7688-03-1.
- Martz, John D. (1964). "Venezuela's Generation of '28': The Genesis of Political Democracy". Journal of Inter-American Studies. 6 (1): 17–32. doi:10.2307/164926. ISSN 0885-3118.
- Montero Brito, Juliet (2016). "Laya, Argelia". In Knight, Franklin W.; Gates, Henry Louis Jr. (eds.). Dictionary of Caribbean and Afro–Latin American Biography. Oxford University Press.
- Mora García, Jose Pascual (2016). "La Maestra Argelia Mercedes Laya López. Aportes al imaginario afrodescendiente venezolano (1926 - 1997)" [The Teacher Argelia Mercedes Laya López: Contributions to the Afro-Venezuelan Imaginary (1926 - 1997)]. Revista Historia de la Educación Latinoamericana. 18 (27): 13–34. doi:10.19053/01227238.5507. ISSN 2256-5248.
- Riches, Christopher; Palmowski, Jan, eds. (2021). "Betancourt, Rómulo". A Dictionary of Contemporary World History. Oxford University Press.
- Tarver, Hollis Michael; Frederick, Julia C. (2005). The History of Venezuela. Westport: Greenwood. ISBN 0-313-33525-7.
- Valobra, Adriana María (2014). "'Mujeres-sombra' y 'Barbudas': Género y política en el Primer Congreso Latinoamericano de Mujeres, Chile- 1959" ['Shadow Women' and 'Bearded Women': Gender and Politics at the First Latin American Congress of Women, Chile - 1959]. Anuario de Historia Argentina (in Spanish). 14. ISSN 2314-257X.
- Venezuelan Ministry of Education, Culture and Sports (2007). "Proyecto Simoncito: educación inicial de calidad política de atención integral para los niños y niñas entre cero y seis años" [Simoncito Project: quality early childhood education, comprehensive care policy for children between zero and six years old]. Educere (in Spanish). 11 (36): 156–167. ISSN 1316-4910.
