= Rafael Guerra Ramos =

Venezuelan politician

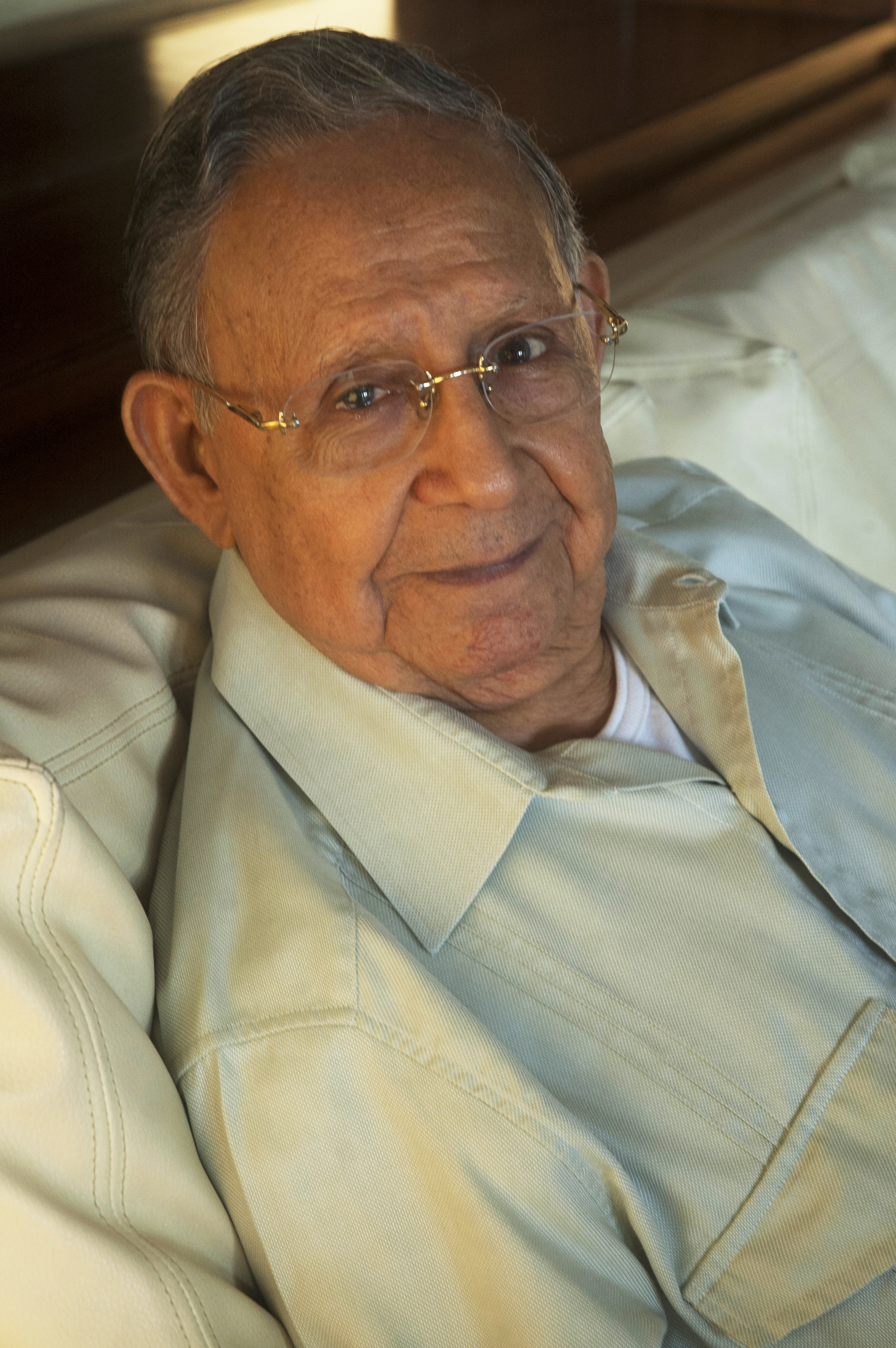

Deputy of the Congress of Venezuela
- In office 1973–1993

Personal details
- Born: 21 May 1930 (age 95) El Alacrán, Guárico
- Party: MAS

Rafael Segundo Guerra Ramos (born May 21, 1930) is a Venezuelan politician who served as a member of the country's parliament from 1973 to 1993. He was a leader of Venezuela's Partido Comunista de Venezuela, PCV (Communist Party of Venezuela) and a founding member of the Movimiento al Socialismo (MAS), but withdrew from the MAS in 1998 after the party's leadership backed the candidacy of Hugo Chávez, for the presidency. Since 1999 he has been outspoken in his opposition to the governments of Chávez and Nicolás Maduro and has served as president and vice president of the Association of Retired Members of Parliament and the Social Welfare Institute for Members of Parliament.

== Biography ==
Rafael Guerra Ramos is the son of rural farmers, Marcos Guerra Rondon and Carmen Trinidad Ramos. Was born in the rural town of El Alacrán, in Guárico, which lies in the plains region of Venezuela. After his mother's passing in 1938, he moved with his father and sister, Carmen Martina Guerra Ramos, to the small town of Pariaguan in the southern part of the Anzoátegui. After completing elementary school, in 1946 his father sent him to Caracas to continue his secondary education, first at the Fermin Toro School and then at the Alcazar school. Later, he also graduated in accounting from the Accounting Institute of Caracas. In 1959, Guerra married Ana Orista Daza Pereira, the niece of Maria Pereira de Daza, a prestigious political leader and founder of the Democratic Action party in Lara. They divorced in 1985. His second marriage was to Flor America Brandt, in 1986. Rafael Guerra Ramos has three children: Boishe Rafael Balza, Rafael Guerra Daza and Olga Teresa Guerra Daza.

=== Political career ===
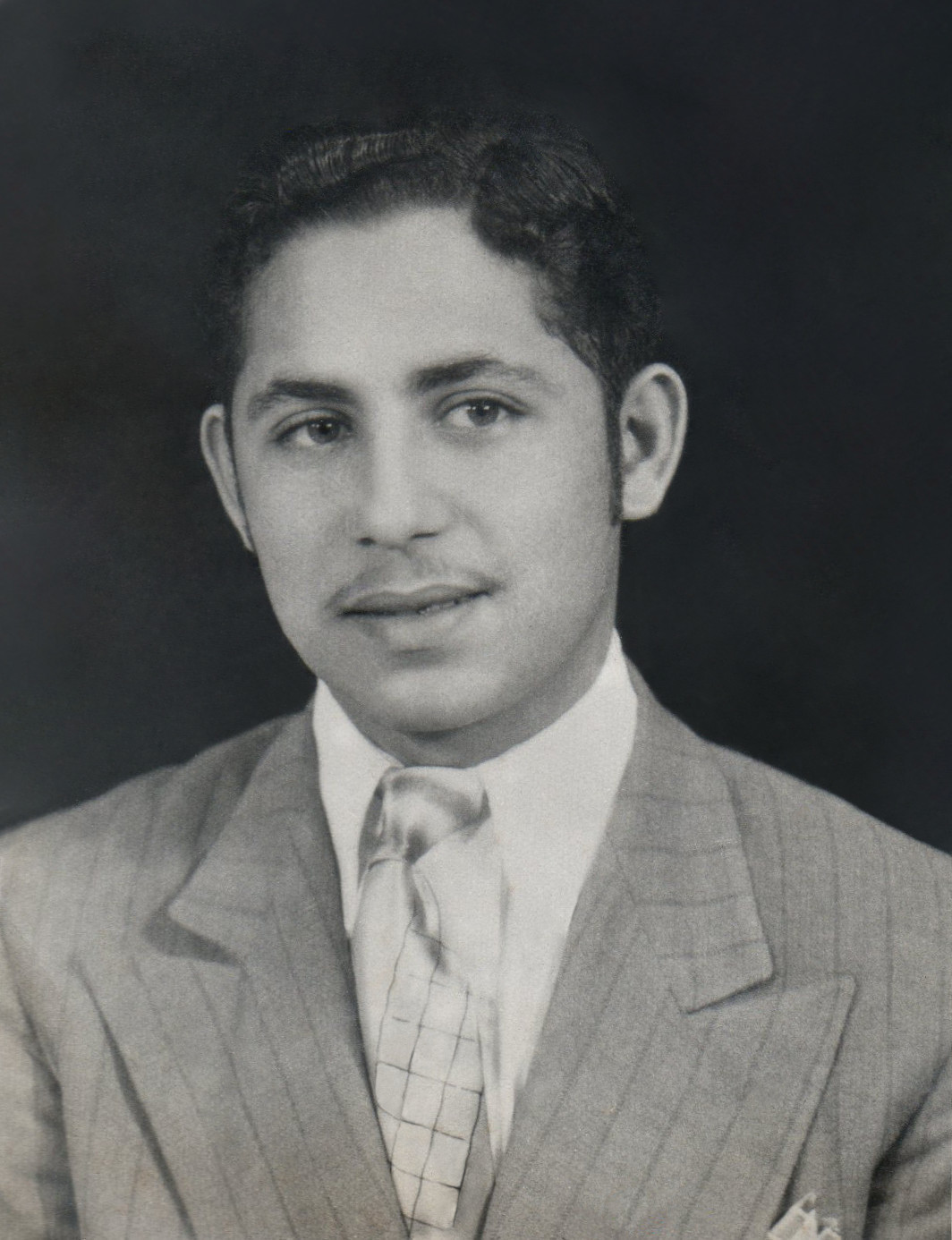
Rafael Guerra Ramos in 1952.

Upon moving to Caracas and entering the Fermin Toro school, Rafael Guerra Ramos became involved in civic, cultural and political activities, which resulted in his election by his classmates as an independent delegate to the so-called Republica Fermintorina, which the school founded to develop the cultural life of the institution. He began his political activity in 1949 when he joined the Communist party's youth group.

During the dictatorship of Marcos Pérez Jiménez, Guerra suffered persecution, torture, imprisonment and had to go underground for his militancy in the PCV. He was first imprisoned in 1952 in the National Security police headquarters and the Carcel Modelo de Propatria prison. The following year, he was again imprisoned in La Modelo for a year and half. After being released from jail, he was exiled to Mexico in 1954.

At the end of that same year, under orders from the polit-bureau of the PCV he was sent on a top secret and highly dangerous mission to an undisclosed location on the Colombian-Venezuelan border and lived clandestinely in the Colombian city of Cucuta until 1956. During this time he constructed a security protocol that was used to aid the safe exit of numerous Venezuelan communists to Colombia and other countries. In December 1955 this clandestine protocol was used to safeguard Pompeyo Márquez (aka Santos Yorme), who was the acting Secretary General of the PCV, in his journey to the 20th Congress of the Communist Party of the USSR. It was at this congress that the Soviet Secretary General Nikita Khrushchev presented his denunciation of the crimes committed by Joseph Stalin.

By 1957 Guerra Ramos was back in Caracas and the PCV leadership gave him the mission to reorganize the party in Lara. Under his direction the Regional Organizational Committee was established and worked very closely with the Patriotic Union, which played a major role in overthrowing the Pérez Jiménez dictatorship.

With the return of democracy and until he withdrew from the PCV, Guerra continued in the party leadership in Lara as either Secretary General or Secretary of Organization. When in 1961 the party decided to engage in armed struggle against the government, Rafael Guerra went along and helped to organize the guerillas in Lara. Because of these activities, he was incarcerated again in 1966, first in a cell of the Palacio Blanco (in front of the Miraflores Presidential Palace) in Caracas, later at the El Tocuyo Military Base, and finally in the National Prison in Maracaibo, but was released that same year after presenting his own defense before the Permanent Martial Court.

The 1968 Soviet invasion of Czechoslovakia led many to question orthodox Marxism and the Soviet model within the PCV. Guerra himself took a very critical position on the guerrilla strategy as well as the party's present and future.

=== Parliamentary career ===
Along with party leaders as Pompeyo Márquez and Teodoro Petkoff, Guerra resigned from the PCV in 1970, and in 1971 became a member of the Constituent Congress of the Movimiento Al Socialismo (MAS). He was a principal member of the first National Directorate and continued his political leadership in Lara. As a candidate for the MAS, he participated for the first time in presidential and parliamentary elections in 1973 and won the seat as a deputy for Lara. The party unanimously elected him as Director of the Parliamentary Caucus, a position which he held again in 1978, 1990 and 1991.

During his many years as a member of Parliament, he presided the Sub-Committees for Human Rights, Penitentiary Affairs, Defense and Tourism. He also represented Venezuela in numerous parliamentary delegations abroad. To this day Guerra Ramos continues to defend the rights of the retired members of Parliament, acting as the president of their association and currently serves as Vice President of the Instituto de Prevision Social del Parlamento (Institute of Social Provision of Parliament).

== See also ==
- Political prisoners in Venezuela
