= 1978 Venezuelan general election =

- 3 December 1978
- Presidential election
- Registered: 6,223,903
- Turnout: 87.56% (▼8.94pp)
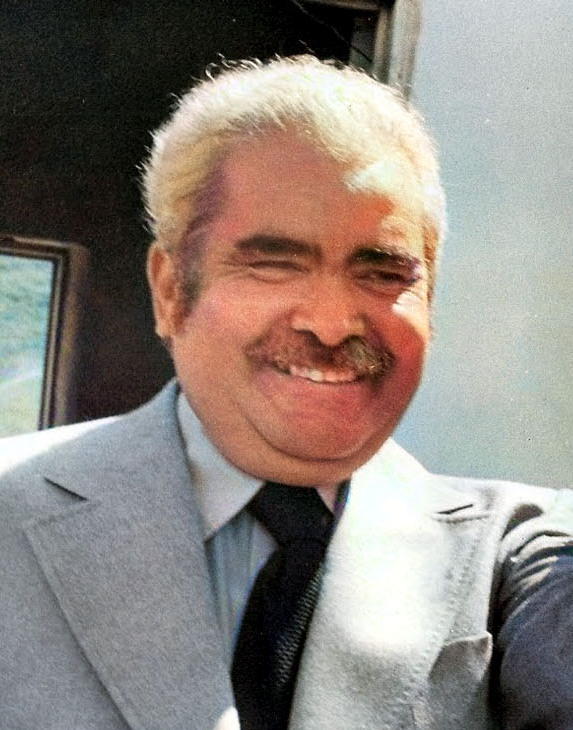

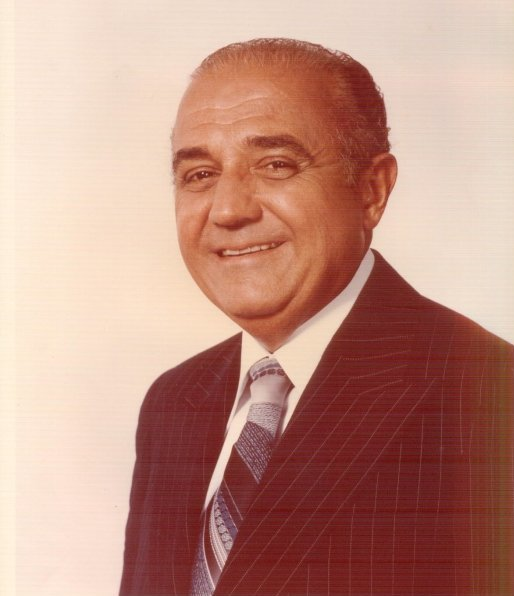

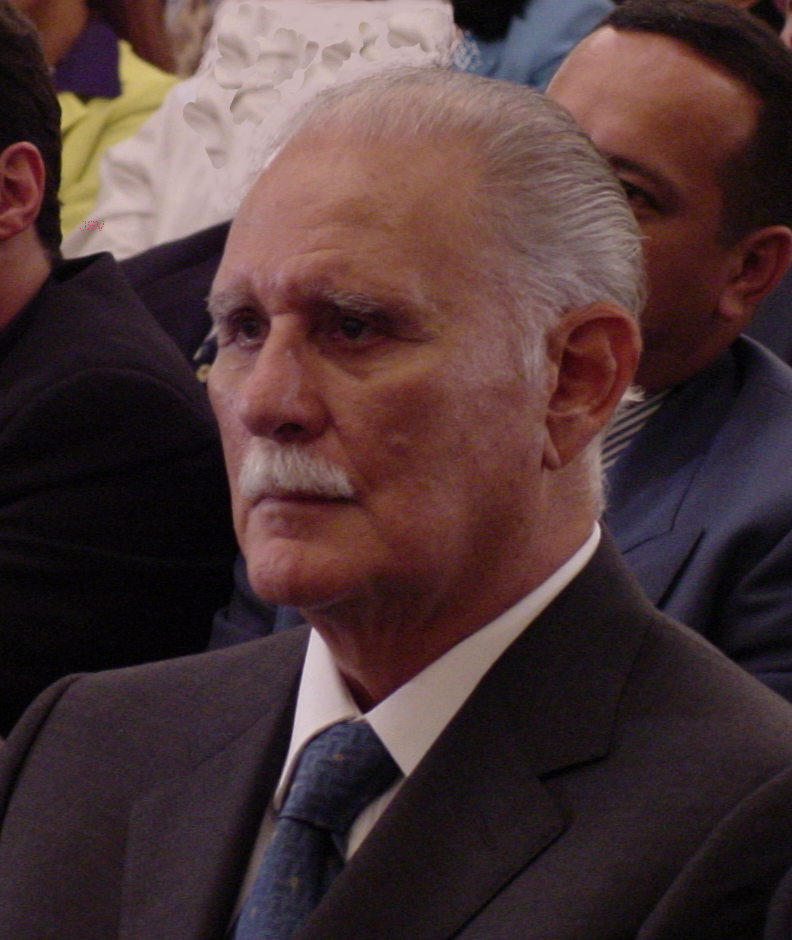
Nominee	Luis Herrera Campins	Luis Piñerúa Ordaz	José Vicente Rangel
Party	Copei	Democratic Action	MAS
Popular vote	2,487,318	2,309,577	276,083
Percentage	46.64%	43.31%	5.18%
President before election
Carlos Andrés Pérez
Democratic Action
Elected President
Luis Herrera Campins
Copei

General elections were held in Venezuela on 3 December 1978. The presidential elections were won by Luis Herrera Campins of Copei, who received 47% of the vote. Although Copei received more votes, Democratic Action won the most seats in the Chamber of Deputies, whilst the two parties won 21 seats each in the Senate. Voter turnout was 88%.

== Results ==
=== President ===
Candidate	Party	Votes	%
Luis Herrera Campins	Copei–URD–FDP–OPINA	2,487,318	46.64
Luis Piñerúa Ordaz	Democratic Action	2,309,577	43.31
José Vicente Rangel	MAS–VUC	276,083	5.18
Diego Arria	Common Cause–MDT	90,060	1.69
Luis Beltrán Prieto Figueroa	People's Electoral Movement	59,747	1.12
Américo Martín	Revolutionary Left Movement	52,287	0.98
Héctor Mujica	Communist Party of Venezuela	29,305	0.55
Leonardo Montiel Ortega	National Renewal Movement	13,918	0.26
Alejandro Gómez	Nationalist Unity Front	8,337	0.16
Pablo Salas Castillo	Nationalist Civic Crusade	6,081	0.11
Total		5,332,713	100.00
Valid votes		5,332,713	97.86
Invalid/blank votes		116,888	2.14
Total votes		5,449,601	100.00
Registered voters/turnout		6,223,903	87.56
Source: Nohlen

=== Congress ===
Party	Votes	%	Seats			
Party	Votes	%	Chamber	+/–	Senate	+/–
Copei	2,103,004	39.81	84	+20	21	+8
Democratic Action	2,096,512	39.68	88	–14	21	–7
Movement for Socialism	325,328	6.16	11	+2	2	0
Revolutionary Left Movement	123,915	2.35	4	+3	0	0
People's Electoral Movement	117,455	2.22	4	–4	0	–2
Democratic Republican Union	88,807	1.68	3	–2	0	–1
Common Cause	85,432	1.62	1	New	0	New
National Integration Movement	83,700	1.58	1	New	0	New
Communist Party of Venezuela	55,168	1.04	1	–1	0	0
Communist Unitarian Vanguard	46,547	0.88	1	New	0	New
Socialist League	30,191	0.57	1	New	0	New
National Renewal Movement	26,235	0.50	0	New	0	New
Labour Movement	22,966	0.43	0	New	0	New
Popular Democratic Front	13,697	0.26	0	0	0	0
Nationalist Unity Front	12,986	0.25	0	0	0	0
Radical Cause	12,573	0.24	0	New	0	New
Nationalist Civic Crusade	10,906	0.21	0	–7	0	–1
Revolutionary Action Group	9,034	0.17	0	New	0	New
National Opinion	7,961	0.15	0	–1	0	0
Independents for Community Development	6,719	0.13	0	New	0	New
Other parties	3,753	0.07	0	–	0	–
Total	5,282,889	100.00	199	–1	44	–3
Valid votes	5,282,889	96.94				
Invalid/blank votes	166,901	3.06				
Total votes	5,449,790	100.00				
Registered voters/turnout	6,223,903	87.56				
Source: Nohlen
