= List of governors of Sucre =

- State coat of arms

- Flag of the State
- Incumbent; Jhoanna Carrillo
- Style: Governor
- Status: Head of State
- Term length: Four years

This is a list of governors of the Venezuelan Sucre State:

Until 1989, they were appointed by the president of Venezuela. Starting from that year they are elected in universal, direct and secret elections.

== Elected governors ==
Took office	Left office	Governor	Vote
1989	1992	Eduardo Morales, Democratic Action	55.27
1992	1995	Ramón Martínez, MAS	61.12
1995	1998	Ramón Martínez, MAS	58.38
1998	2000	Eloy Gil, Democratic Action	48.20
2000	2004	Ramón Martínez, MAS	58.16
2004	2008	Ramón Martínez, MVR	62.19
2008	2012	Enrique Maestre, PSUV	56.08
2012	2016	Luis Acuña, PSUV	59.80
2016	2017	Edwin Rojas, PSUV	Replacement after Acuña resigned office for health issues.
2017	2021	Edwin Rojas, PSUV	59,79
2021	2025	Gilberto Pinto Blanco, PSUV	47,13
2025	2029	Jhoanna Carrillo, GPPSB	94,40

== See also ==
- List of Venezuela governors
- Politics of Venezuela
- History of Venezuela
