= Emeterio Gómez =

Venezuelan economist (1942–2020)

Emeterio Gómez (Nueva Esparta, 12 March 1942 – Canary Islands, 20 April 2020) was a Venezuelan economist, philosopher and university teacher.

== Biography ==
Gómez graduated as an economist from the Central University of Venezuela (UCV) in 1965 and obtained a postgraduate degree in philosophy from the Simón Bolívar University. In 1980, he was director of social sciences at the University of Paris and tenured professor at the UCV since 1966. Gómez also wrote articles for Tal Cual and was the author of several books on the economic history of his country, such as "El Empresariado Venezolano"; "Marx, ciencia o ideología"; "Padre; Confieso que he invertido", among others.

In 2013, while working as a professor at the Simón Bolívar University (USB), he suffered a fall due to a cardiac arrhythmia that caused a serious head injury, which resulted in memory loss. As a result of the situation, in 2019, his family started a campaign on GoFundMe to collect funds to help with the costs of medicines, assisted mobility and stay.

He moved to Spain, where he resided with his wife. After suffering a fall which caused a fracture, he was admitted to the hospital where he was infected by SARS-CoV-2 during the COVID-19 pandemic in Spain. He died on 20 April 2020, aged 78, of COVID-19.
