= 1968 Venezuelan general election =

- 1 December 1968
- Presidential election
- Registered: 4,134,928
- Turnout: 96.73% (▲4.46pp)
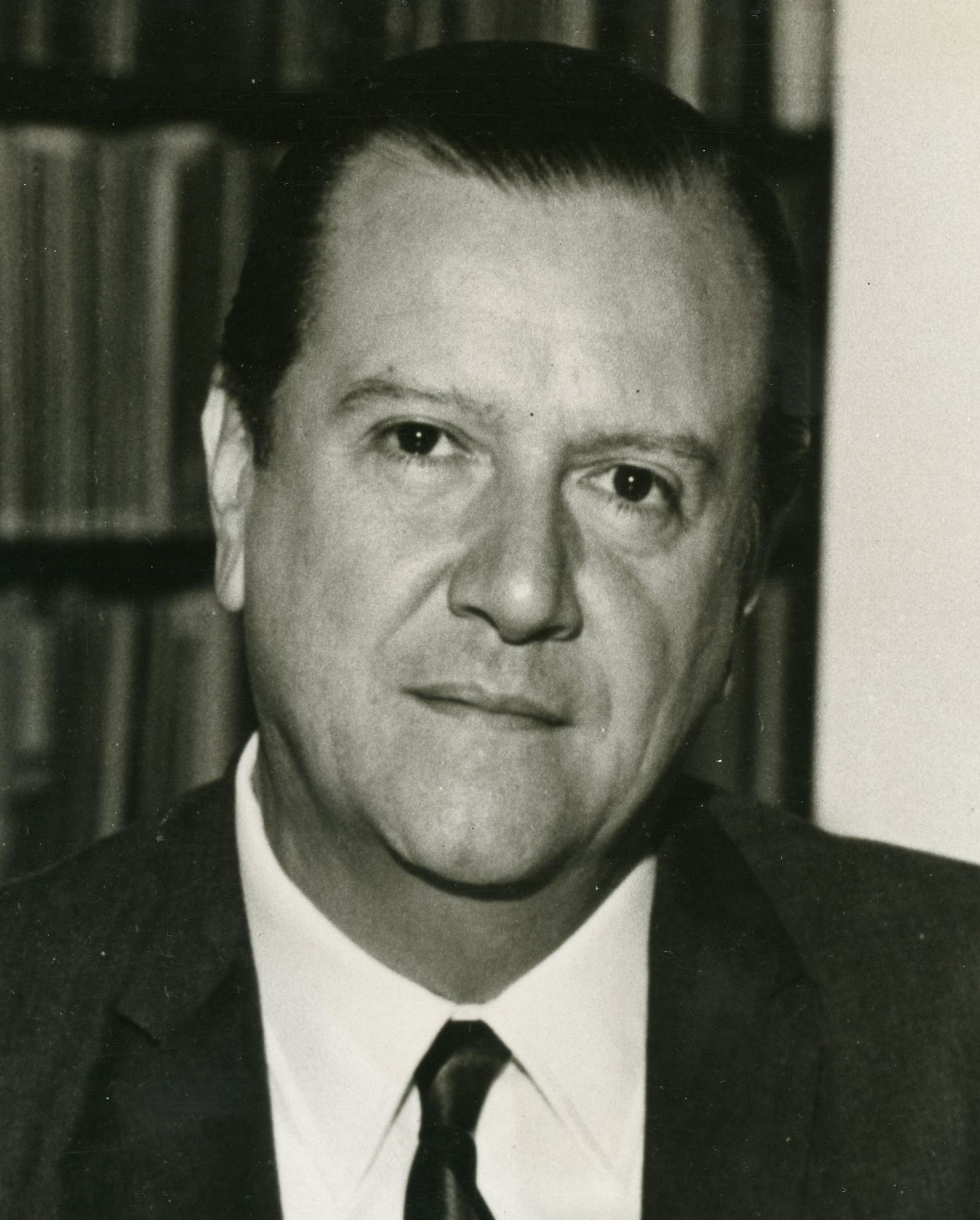

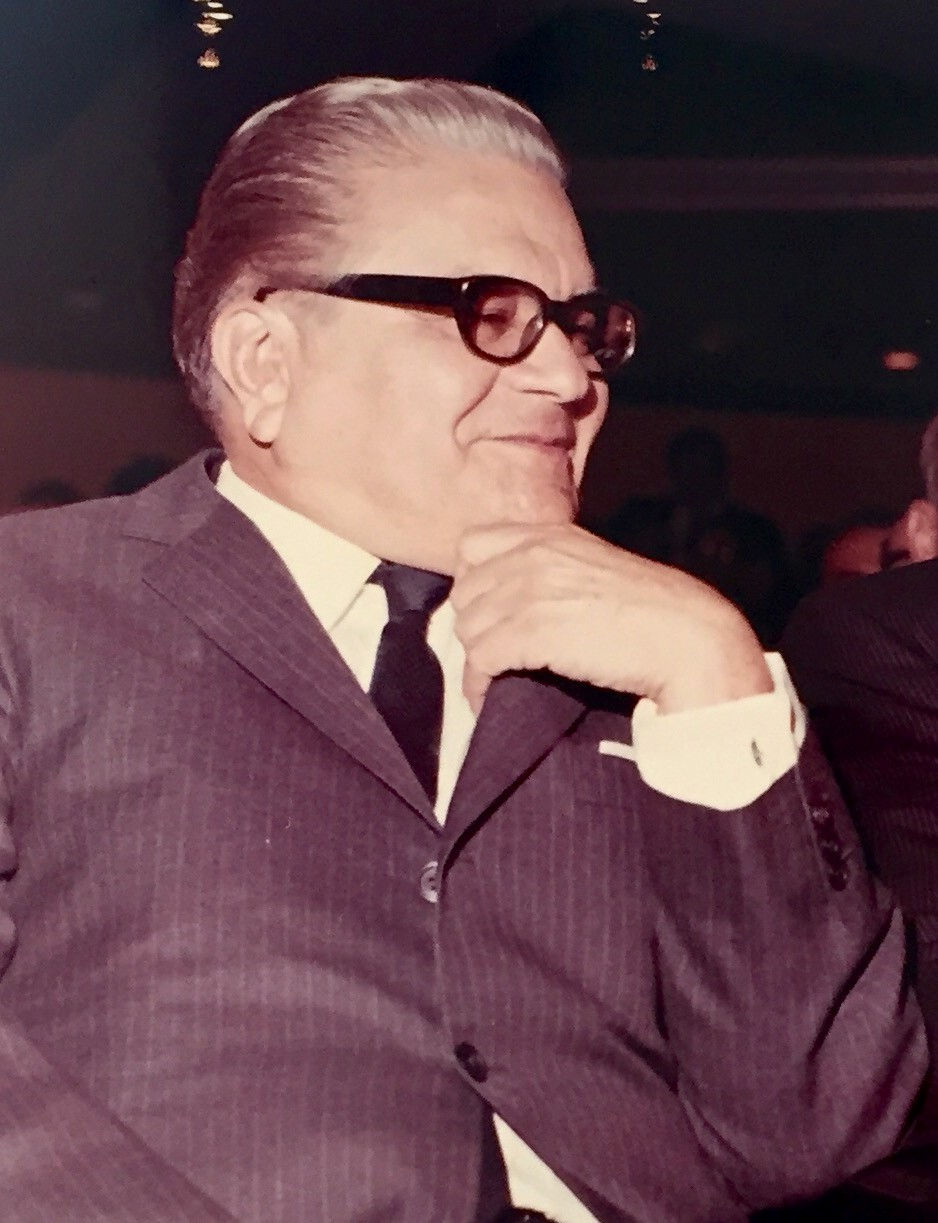

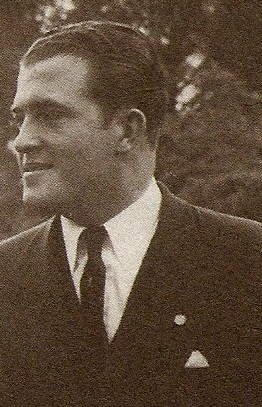

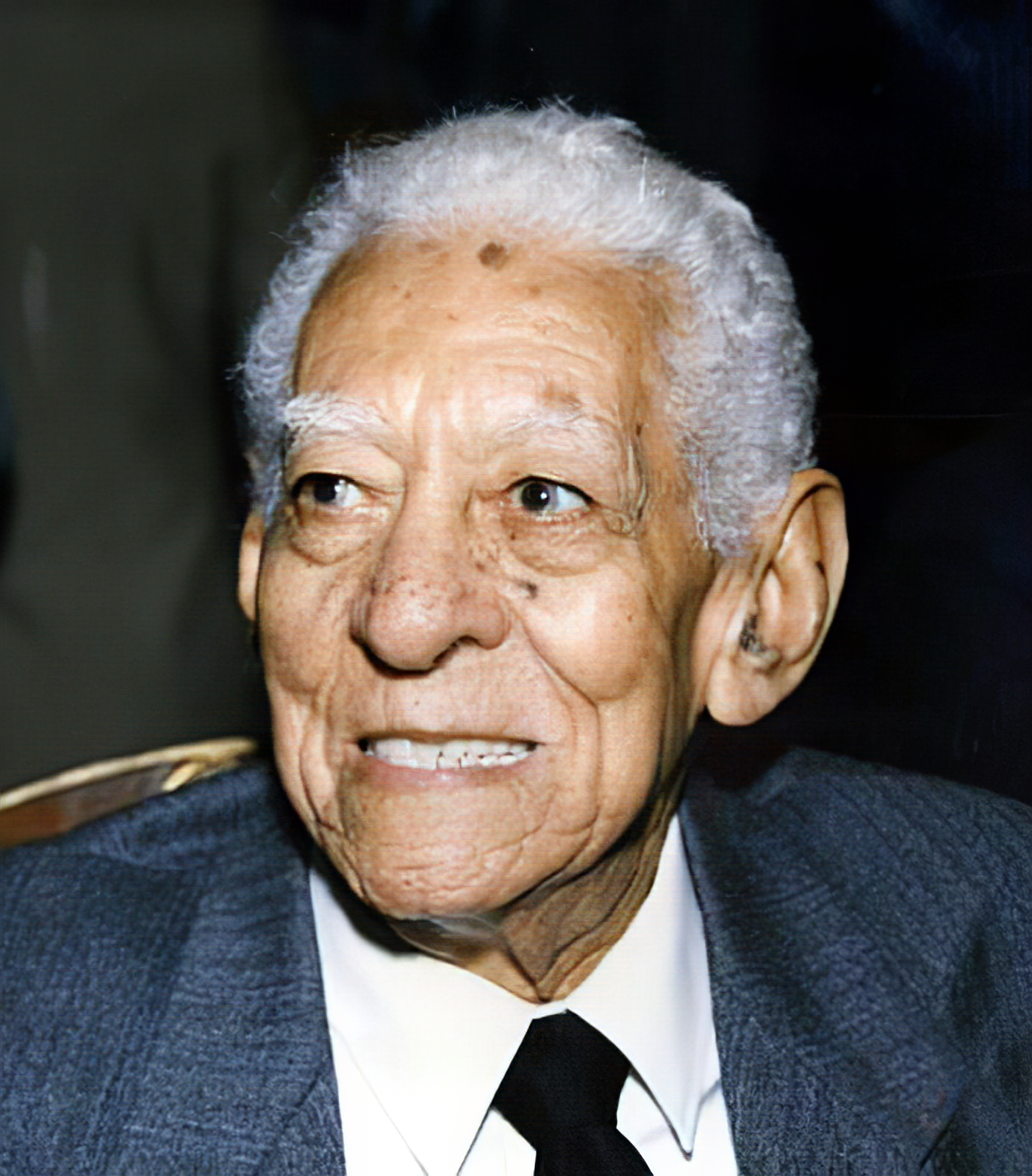
Nominee	Rafael Caldera	Gonzalo Barrios
Party	Copei	Democratic Action
Popular vote	1,083,712	1,050,806
Percentage	29.13%	28.24%
Nominee	Miguel Burelli	Luis Prieto
Party	URD	MEP
Popular vote	826,758	719,461
Percentage	22.22%	19.34%
President before election
Raúl Leoni
Democratic Action
Elected President
Rafael Caldera
Copei

General elections were held in Venezuela on 1 December 1968. The presidential election was won by Rafael Caldera of Copei, who received 29.1% of the vote. Acción Democrática (Democratic Action, AD) remained the largest party in the Chamber of Deputies and Senate. Voter turnout was 96.7% in the presidential election and 94.5% in the Congressional elections. When Caldera took office in March 1969, it marked the first time in Venezuela's history as an independent nation that the sitting government peacefully transferred power to an elected member of the opposition.

== Background ==
The election was shaped by a split in AD. Luis Beltrán Prieto Figueroa, then President of the Venezuelan Senate and President of AD, won the AD primary election (held in 1967). His nomination was overturned in favor of Gonzalo Barrios by the Rómulo Betancourt faction of AD, which considered Prieto Figueroa too left-wing. Prieto Figueroa and a substantial number of his supporters then split from AD and formed a new party: the People's Electoral Movement ("Movimiento Electoral del Pueblo" - MEP). Ultimately, Prieto finished fourth, but his 719,000 votes far exceeded the 32,900-vote gap between Caldera and Barrios.

== Results ==
=== President ===
Candidate	Party	Votes	%
Rafael Caldera	Copei–MDI	1,083,712	29.13
Gonzalo Barrios	AD–API–AIR–OPIR	1,050,806	28.24
Miguel Ángel Burelli Rivas	URD–FDP–FND–MENI	826,758	22.22
Luis Beltrán Prieto Figueroa	MEP–PRIN–OPINA	719,461	19.34
Alejandro Hernández	Democratic Socialist Party	27,336	0.73
Germán Borregales	National Action Movement	12,587	0.34
Total		3,720,660	100.00
Valid votes		3,720,660	93.03
Invalid/blank votes		278,957	6.97
Total votes		3,999,617	100.00
Registered voters/turnout		4,134,928	96.73
Source: Nohlen

=== Congress ===
Party	Votes	%	Seats			
Party	Votes	%	Chamber	+/–	Senate	+/–
Democratic Action	939,759	25.55	66	0	19	–3
Copei	883,814	24.03	59	+20	16	+8
People's Electoral Movement	475,909	12.94	25	New	5	New
Nationalist Civic Crusade	402,351	10.94	21	New	4	New
Democratic Republican Union	340,195	9.25	18	–11	3	–4
Popular Democratic Front	194,931	5.30	10	–6	2	–2
Union for Progress	103,591	2.82	5	New	1	New
Democratic National Front	96,027	2.61	4	New	1	New
Revolutionary Party of Nationalist Integration	88,509	2.41	4	New	1	New
Democratic Socialist Party	29,920	0.81	1	0	0	0
National Action Movement	24,407	0.66	1	+1	0	0
Independent Democratic Movement	18,337	0.50	0	New	0	New
Independent Popular Alliance	18,332	0.50	0	New	0	New
Independent National Electoral Movement	13,847	0.38	0	–1	0	0
Revolutionary Independent Action	9,154	0.25	0	New	0	New
National Opinion	7,339	0.20	0	New	0	New
18 other parties	31,662	0.86	0	–	0	–
Total	3,678,084	100.00	214	+35	52	+5
Valid votes	3,678,084	94.12				
Invalid/blank votes	229,739	5.88				
Total votes	3,907,823	100.00				
Registered voters/turnout	4,134,928	94.51				
Source: Nohlen
