= National Action Movement =

The National Action Movement can refer to:

- The National Action Movement (Portugal)
- The National Action Movement (Venezuela)
