= Cristóbal Fernández =

Cristóbal Fernández may refer to:

- Cristóbal Fernández Valtodano (fl. 16th century), Spanish prelate of the Roman Catholic Church
- Cristóbal Fernández Daló (fl. 1990s), Venezuelan politician
- Cristo Fernández (born 1991), Mexican actor and footballer
