= Luis Alfonso Dávila =

Venezuelan politician

President of the Senate of Venezuela
- In office 23 January 1999 – 22 December 1999
- Preceded by: Pedro Pablo Aguilar
- Succeeded by: Senate abolished

Minister of the Interior of Venezuela
- In office 2000 – 15 February 2001
- President: Hugo Chavez
- Preceded by: Ignacio Arcaya
- Succeeded by: Luis Miquilena

Minister of Foreign Affairs of Venezuela
- In office 15 February 2001 – 30 May 2002
- President: Hugo Chavez
- Preceded by: José Vicente Rangel
- Succeeded by: Roy Chaderton

Personal details
- Born: 6 December 1943 (age 82)

Luis Alfonso Dávila (born 6 December 1943) is a Venezuelan politician. Dávila served as President of the Venezuelan Senate in 1999, as well as Minister of the Interior between 2000 and 2001 and as Minister of Foreign Affairs between 2001 and 2002, during the tenure of President Hugo Chávez.

== Career ==
=== Early military and party positions ===
Dávila is a retired air force officer, with the rank of Colonel. Dávila knew Hugo Chávez as a cadet in the armored brigade of San Fernando de Apure. Dávila asked to be discharged from the military in 1990, even though he had been considered for the position of general under the president Carlos Andrés Pérez. Instead he retired from being a Commander of a unit in the Army of Venezuela and dedicated himself to cattle ranching. Dávila recollects being “delighted” at the attempt to change the Venezuelan government in 1992, when Chávez attempted an unsuccessful military coup. In 1994 Chávez asked Dávila to help him on a political project. Dávila was elected to the Venezuelan Senate in the 1998 elections, becoming its president before the Senate was dissolved by the 1999 Constitution of Venezuela.

=== Minister of the Interior ===
In 2000, Dávila became the Minister of the Interior of Venezuela. In February 2000, while Minister of the Interior, Dávila “blamed the media for the criminality rampant in the country [of Venezuela].” Dávila was Minister of the Interior until February 2001, when he was appointed to the foreign affairs department and was replaced as Interior Minister by Luis Miquilena, a political mentor to Chávez. At the time, Dávila was "under fire recently for failing to curb Venezuela's rising crime rate."

=== Minister of Foreign Relations ===
In February 2001 Dávila was appointed as Minister of Foreign Affairs of Venezuela.

On November 29 and 30 of 2001, Dávila made an official visit to Guyana, meeting with president Bharrat Jagdeo and paying courtesy visits to Ralph Ramkarran, Desmond Hoyte, and Edwin Carrington. Discussions dealt with Venezuela’s territorial claim, and the Caracas Energy Cooperation Accord. In the conversations, Dávila asserted that his country would be “willing to grant Guyana beneficiary status under the accord.”

Starting in 2001, Dávila took the position from Chávez’s right-hand man Luis Miquilena. Dávila “placed [his] followers at all levels,” and like Miquilena, he rejected Cuban socialism in favor of consolidation over radicalization. He opposed the 2002 April coup. He was replaced as foreign minister by Roy Chaderton in May 2002, having briefly been replaced by José Rodríguez Iturbe in 2002. Dávila exited the Chavista movement in 2003, after his defeat in the 2003 internal elections of the Chavista party.

In the 2008 regional elections he stood as an independent, gaining less than 1% of the vote.

== Politics ==
Although Dávila was a “trusted man” of Hugo Chávez between 1994 and 2004, around a decade later, he told regional press that supporting Chávez had been his “biggest mistake.”

== See also ==
- List of ministers of foreign affairs of Venezuela
- List of ministers of interior of Venezuela

Political offices
Preceded by Ignacio Arcaya	Minister of Interior of Venezuela; 2000–2001	Succeeded by Luis Miquilena
Preceded by José Vicente Rangel	180th Minister of Foreign Affairs of Venezuela; 15 February 2001-30 May 2002	Succeeded by José Rodríguez Iturbe
Preceded by José Rodríguez Iturbe	180th Minister of Foreign Affairs of Venezuela; 15 February 2002 – 30 May 2002	Succeeded by Roy Chaderton
