= Andrés Bello Municipality, Mérida =

Andrés Bello Municipality Municipio Andrés Bello
- Municipality
- Flag Coat of arms

- Location in Mérida

- Location in Venezuela
- Coordinates: 8°42′52″N 71°26′42″W
- Country: Venezuela
- State: Mérida
- Municipal seat: La Azulita

Government
  - Mayor: Carlos Rosales (PSUV)

Area
  - Total: 398 km^{2} (154 sq mi)

Population (2007)
  - Total: 14,029
  - Density: 35.2/km^{2} (91.3/sq mi)
- Time zone: UTC−4 (VET)
- Postal code(s): 5102
- Area code(s): 0274
- Website: Official website

The Andrés Bello Municipality is one of the 23 municipalities (municipios) that makes up the Venezuelan state of Mérida and, according to a 2007 population estimate by the National Institute of Statistics of Venezuela, the municipality has a population of 14,029. The town of La Azulita is the shire town of the Andrés Bello Municipality. The municipality is one of a number in Venezuela named "Andrés Bello Municipality", in honour of the writer Andrés Bello.

== Demographics ==
The Andrés Bello Municipality, according to a 2007 population estimate by the National Institute of Statistics of Venezuela, has a population of 14,029 (up from 11,962 in 2000). This amounts to 1.7% of the state's population. The municipality's population density is 35.2 inhabitants per square kilometre (91/sq mi).

== Government ==
The mayor of the Andrés Bello Municipality is Maria Elena Villasmil, elected on November 21, 2021, with 55% of the vote. The municipality is divided into one Parish (Capital Andrés Bello).

== See also ==
- La Azulita
- Mérida
- Municipalities of Venezuela
