= Ramón Martínez (governor) =

Venezuelan politician (1948–2022)

Ramón Martínez Abdenour
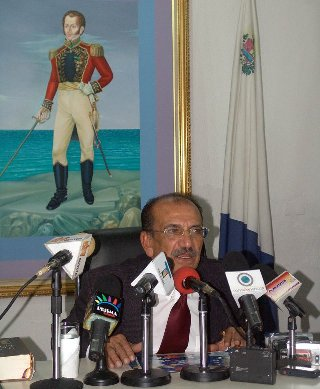

Governor of Sucre
- In office 1992–1998
- Preceded by: Eduardo Morales
- Succeeded by: Eloy Gil

Governor of Sucre
- In office 2000–2008
- Preceded by: Eloy Gil
- Succeeded by: Enrique Maestre

Personal details
- Born: 31 August 1948 Carúpano, Venezuela
- Died: 25 January 2022 (aged 73)
- Party: For Social Democracy
- Profession: Politician

Ramón Martínez (31 August 1948 – 25 January 2022) was a Venezuelan politician.

== Biography ==
He was the Governor of the state of Sucre from 1992 to 1998 for the Movement for Socialism, and again from 2000 to 2008, first for Movement for Socialism and then for For Social Democracy. From 1998 to 2000 he was a member of the Venezuelan Senate.

Martínez had previously been a member of the Venezuelan Chamber of Deputies. He died from COVID-19 on 25 January 2022, at the age of 73.

== See also ==
- List of Venezuela governors
