= José Vicente Rangel =

Venezuelan politician and journalist (1929–2020)

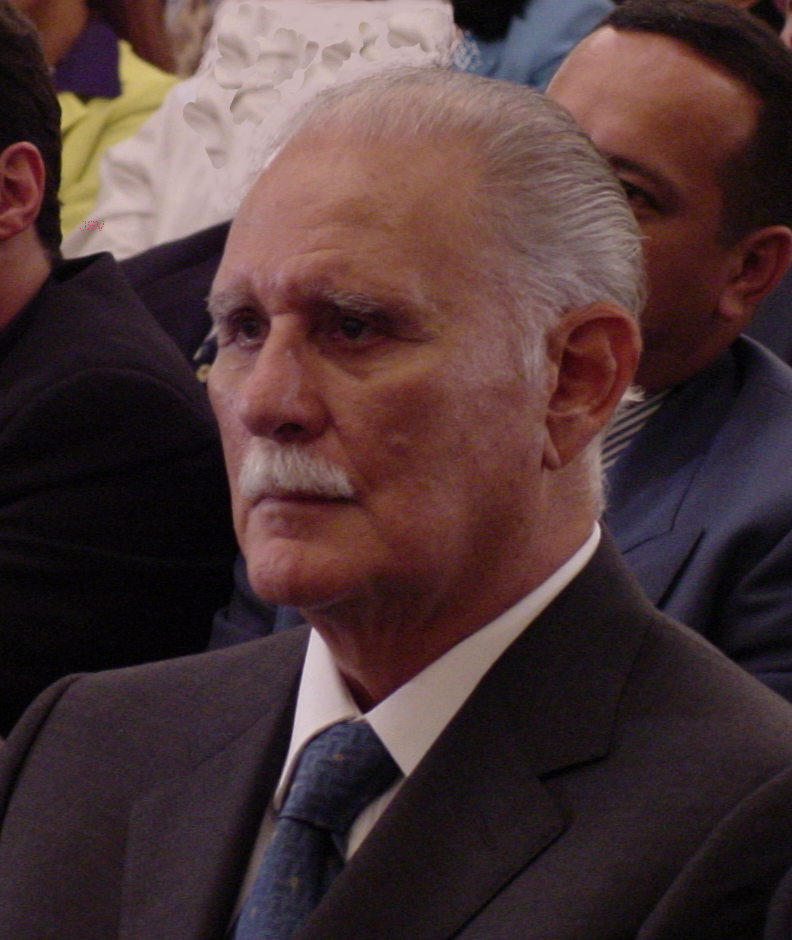
- Rangel in 2008

Vice President of Venezuela
- In office 14 April 2002 – 3 January 2007
- President: Hugo Chávez
- Preceded by: Diosdado Cabello
- Succeeded by: Jorge Rodriguez

Minister of Defense
- In office 14 February 2001 – 14 April 2002
- President: Hugo Chávez
- Preceded by: Ismael Hurtado
- Succeeded by: Lucas Rincón

Minister of Foreign Affairs
- In office 2 February 1999 – 14 February 2001
- President: Hugo Chavez
- Preceded by: Miguel Ángel Burelli Rivas
- Succeeded by: Luis Alfonso Dávila

Personal details
- Born: José Vicente Rangel Vale; 10 July 1929 Caracas, Venezuela
- Died: 18 December 2020 (aged 91) Caracas, Venezuela
- Party: PSUV (2007–2020)
- Other political affiliations: MAS (1971–2007); MEP (1967–1971); URD (1945–1967)
- Spouse: Ana Ávalos
- Profession: Lawyer and Journalist

José Vicente Rangel Vale (10 July 1929 – 18 December 2020) was a Venezuelan lawyer, journalist and politician. He ran for president three times in the 1970s and 1980s and later supported Hugo Chávez. He served under Chávez as Minister of Foreign Affairs from 1999 to 2001, as Minister of Defense from 2001 to 2002, and as the vice president from 2002 to 2007.

== Political activism ==
Born in Caracas, he returned to Venezuela following the downfall of the dictatorship of Marcos Pérez Jiménez in 1958 and was elected to the Congress that same year, representing the Democratic Republican Union (Unión Republicana Democrática, URD). In addition to his political activities, he worked as a lawyer and journalist. He also made presidential bids on three occasions: in the 1973 presidential election and 1978 presidential election as candidate of MAS – Movimiento al Socialismo (Movement for Socialism), and in the 1983 presidential election as candidate of MEP – Movimiento Electoral del Pueblo.

== Journalist ==
In 1990, Rangel re-entered journalism, contributing to a range of newspapers as a columnist (including El Universal, Panorama, El Informador, La Tarde, El Regional, 2001). In the 1960s he was editor of the weekly Qué Pasa en Venezuela (1960–67) and of the dailies La Razón and Clarín.

Rangel played a role in the 1993 impeachment of President Carlos Andrés Pérez, being the first to publish (in November 1992) the corruption allegations which would ultimately be endorsed by the Supreme Court. On 20 May 1993, the Supreme Court considered the accusation valid, and the National Congress removed Pérez from office. He was imprisoned and sentenced to two years of prison in May 1994 for malversation of funds of the so-called secret fund. For many years he has held a political opinion show on Televen called "José Vicente Hoy".

== Political career ==
Hugo Chávez chose Rangel to serve as his Minister of Foreign Affairs when he took office as president in February 1999. Rangel served in that position until early February 2001, when Chávez instead appointed him as Minister of Defence, replacing General Ismael Hurtado. Rangel was the first civilian to serve as Defense Minister in decades.

After a little more than a year as Minister of Defense, Rangel became vice-president in May 2002, replacing Diosdado Cabello. On 3 January 2007, Chávez announced that Rangel would be replaced as vice president by Jorge Rodríguez. Chávez said that the decision was "not easy", and that he regarded Rangel "with the same respect and affection as a son would a father", but did not explain the reasoning behind the decision. At the swearing in ceremony for the new cabinet on 8 January, Rangel said that he was leaving the government, but not the revolution. He and Rodríguez exchanged praise, with the latter saying that Rangel was the first person he had ever voted for, in the 1983 election.

== Personal life and death ==
Rangel was the author of Expediente Negro, an investigation of human rights violations in Venezuela in the 1960s and 1970s. His son, José Vicente Rangel Ávalos, has also been involved in Venezuelan politics, having been mayor of the Sucre District in Caracas. Rangel died of cardiac arrest on 18 December 2020. He was 91 years old.

== Books ==
- Expediente Negro, Caracas: Editorial Fuentes, 1972
- Tiempo de Verdades, Caracas: Ediciones Centauro, 1973 – a selection of Rangel's press contributions
- Rangel et al., Militares y política (una polėmica inconclusa), Caracas: Ediciones Centauro, 1976
- Seguridad, defensa, democracia: Un tema para cíviles y militares, Caracas: Ediciones Centauro, 1980
- Socialismo y Democracia
- La Administración de Justicia en Venezuela

== See also ==
- Vice President of Venezuela
- List of ministers of foreign affairs of Venezuela
- Los Notables

Political offices
Preceded by Diosdado Cabello Rondón	Vice President of Venezuela; 2002–2007	Succeeded by Jorge Rodríguez
Preceded by	Venezuelan Minister of Defense; 2001–2002	Succeeded by
Preceded by Miguel Ángel Burelli Rivas	180th Venezuelan Minister of Foreign Affairs; 2 February 1999 – 14 February 2001	Succeeded by Luis Alfonso Dávila
