= Andrés Bello Municipality =

Andrés Bello Municipality may refer to the following places in the Venezuela:

- Andrés Bello Municipality, Mérida
- Andrés Bello Municipality, Miranda
- Andrés Bello Municipality, Táchira
- Andrés Bello Municipality, Trujillo
