= Andrés Bello Municipality, Miranda =

Andrés Bello Municipality Municipio Andrés Bello
- Municipality
- Flag Coat of arms

- Location in Miranda

- Location in Venezuela
- Coordinates: 10°16′18″N 66°01′30″W
- Country: Venezuela
- State: Miranda
- Municipal seat: San José de Barlovento

Government
  - Mayor: Isbel Bencomo Ramírez (PSUV)

Area
  - Total: 117.8 km^{2} (45.5 sq mi)

Population (2007)
  - Total: 25,208
  - Density: 214.0/km^{2} (554.2/sq mi)
- Time zone: UTC−4 (VET)
- Area code(s): 0234
- Website: Official website

Andrés Bello is one of the 21 municipalities (municipios) that makes up the Venezuelan state of Miranda and, according to a 2007 population estimate by the National Institute of Statistics of Venezuela, the municipality has a population of 25,208. The town of San José de Barlovento is the shire town of the Andrés Bello Municipality. The municipality is one of a number in Venezuela named "Andrés Bello Municipality", in honour of the writer Andrés Bello.

== Demographics ==
The Andrés Bello Municipality, according to a 2007 population estimate by the National Institute of Statistics of Venezuela, has a population of 25,208 (up from 21,725 in 2000). This amounts to 0.9% of the state's population. The municipality's population density is 221.12 inhabitants per square kilometre (572.7/sq mi).

== Government ==
The mayor of the Andrés Bello Municipality is Albaro Ramón Hidalgo Rudas, elected on October 31, 2004, with 50% of the vote. He replaced Ramon Lobo shortly after the elections. The municipality is divided into two parishes; San José de Barlovento and Cumbo.
