= Expediente Negro =

Book by José Vicente Rangel

- Author: José Vicente Rangel
- Genre: Non-fiction
- Publication date: 1972

Expediente Negro (Spanish for "Black Dossier") is a non-fiction 1972 book written by José Vicente Rangel about the murders in the 1960s of Venezuelan campesinos (farmers).
