= Germán Borregales =

Venezuelan journalist, writer and politician (1909–1984)

Germán Borregales (28 May 1909, Coro region – 2 March 1984, Caracas) was a Venezuelan journalist, author and politician. Belonging to the rightist tendency within Venezuelan politics, he became notorious as a regular candidate for the presidency.

== Journalism ==
Borregales was born into a high-ranking family who were prominent in the provincial state of Falcón. He trained as a journalist at several international institutions, notably in Geneva and Columbia University. As a journalist Borregales wrote for several newspapers, including El Universal and La Religión as well as a journal he founded himself, Falconidad. His writing was highly anti-communist, generally taking a confrontational tone towards the left.

== Politics ==
A strong supporter of the Catholic Church, he combined his religious views with his strong nationalism and anti-communism. Borregales espoused strongly conservative views and was characterised as belonging to the far right of Venezuelan politics. Initially a member of COPEI, Borregales was for many years a close ally of Rafael Caldera. He was however strongly opposed to land reform, considering it both unproductive and unfair and when he voiced his objections to such plans. As a result he resigned from the party and distanced himself from Rafael Caldera, due to his stances with communist ideology. Including relations with China.

Having resigned from COPEI, Borregales established his own political party, the National Action Movement (MAN) in 1960. A small party with little popular support, it functioned largely as the personal party of Borregales, a common set-up in Latin American politics at the time.

In 1963 Borregales presented as a candidate for both the Presidency and a seat in the National Assembly, although neither attempt succeeded. Indeed the purpose of his campaign was widely questioned due to the MAN's lack of any support base and the final vote tallies for Borregales were derisory. Nonetheless the party returned in 1968 and, whilst once again Borregales failed to come close to the Presidency, he was elected to the Assembly as MAN's sole representative. He lost the seat in 1973 when once again his candidacy for the Presidency fell well short of success. By that point Borregales' fruitless attempts to become President of Venezuela had led to his becoming a popular target for the country's satirists. This was to be his final election and he faded from public life thereafter.
