= Roy Chaderton =

Venezuelan diplomat

Roy Chaderton Matos

Member of Parliament for Venezuela at the Latin American Parliament
- In office 2011 – To Date

Ambassador Permanent Representative of Venezuela to OAS
- In office 2008–2015
- President: Hugo Chavez (2008); Nicolás Maduro (2013)
- Preceded by: Jorge Valero
- Succeeded by: Bernardo Álvarez Herrera

Minister of Foreign Affairs of Venezuela
- In office 30 May 2002 – 13 July 2004
- President: Hugo Chavez
- Preceded by: Luis Alfonso Dávila
- Succeeded by: Jesús Pérez

Personal details
- Born: 17 August 1942 (age 84)
- Party: PSUV
- Profession: politician, diplomat, lawyer

Roy Chaderton Matos (born August 17, 1942) is a Venezuelan diplomat. A graduate of the Universidad Central de Venezuela. He was foreign minister from May 2002 to July 2004 in the government of Hugo Chávez.

== Diplomatic career ==
Chaderton is a senior member of the Venezuelan Diplomatic Service. He served in Poland, Germany, Belgium and the Permanent Mission of Venezuela to the United Nations. He was Ambassador to Gabon from 1985 to 1987; Ambassador to Norway from 1987 to 1990; director general of international policy from 1990 to 1993; Ambassador to Canada from 1993 to 1994; Vice Minister of Foreign Relations from 1994 to 1995; Ambassador to the United Kingdom from 1996 to 2000; Ambassador to Colombia from 2001 to 2002; Minister of Foreign Relations from 2002 to 2004; Ambassador to France from 2004 to 2007; Ambassador to Mexico and Ambassador Permanent Representative to the Organization of American States (OAS) from 2008 to 2015.

He was the director-general of the Pedro Gual Diplomatic Institute at the Venezuelan Foreign Ministry, previously he was chancellery coordinator, deputy at the Latin American Parliament in Panama, Venezuelan Ambassador empowered to pursue peace talks with the Government of Colombia and FARC in Cuba and In-charge of International Affairs of the PSUV. Currently he is accredited to Switzerland as Ambassador Extraordinary and Plenipotentiary of the Bolivarian Republic of Venezuela since 4 April 2022.

== Sanctions ==
The snipers aim at the head, but there comes a time when a squalid (opposition) head is no different from a Chavista head, except in the content. The sound produced by a squalid head is much smaller, it is like a crack, because the cranial vault is hollow and passes quickly. But that is known after the projectile passes through.

— Roy Chaderton, interview in Zurda Konducta

In 2015, the group Venezuelans Persecuted in Exile (Veppex) in Miami asked the Secretary General of the Organization of American States José Miguel Insulza to sanction Roy Chaderton, then ambassador to the organization, for a controversial statement made during an interview on the program Zurda Konducta of the state-owned Venezolana de Televisión. Veppex highlighted in a statement that the description made by the ambassador was "a comparison that incites violence". Chaderton apologized for his comment saying that his statements were taken out of context, and that what he was trying to warn was that in the face of an "invasion by the United States" there would be no distinction between Chavistas and opponents.

Canada sanctioned 40 Venezuelan officials, including Chaderton, in September 2017. The sanctions were for behaviors that undermined democracy after at least 125 people were killed in the 2017 Venezuelan protests and "in response to the government of Venezuela's deepening descent into dictatorship"; Chrystia Freeland, Foreign Minister said, "Canada will not stand by silently as the government of Venezuela robs its people of their fundamental democratic rights". The Canadian regulations of the Special Economic Measures Act prohibited any "person in Canada and any Canadian outside Canada from: dealing in property, wherever situated, that is owned, held or controlled by listed persons or a person acting on behalf of a listed person; entering into or facilitating any transaction related to a dealing prohibited by these Regulations; providing any financial or related services in respect of a dealing prohibited by these Regulations; making available any goods, wherever situated, to a listed person or a person acting on behalf of a listed person; and providing any financial or other related services to or for the benefit of a listed person."

== Honours ==
- Order of the Liberator, First Class
- Order of Francisco de Miranda, First Class
- Order of May, Grand Cross
- Order of St. Olav, Grand Cross
- Order of Bernardo O'Higgins
- Order of San Carlos, Grand Cross
- National Order of Merit (France), Grand Officer
- Order of the Southern Cross, Grand Cross
- Order of the Sun of Peru, Grand Cross
- Order of the Madara Horseman, Bulgaria
- Order Doctor César Naranjo Ostty, Venezuela
- Admiral Luis Brion Naval Medal, Venezuela

== See also ==
- List of ministers of foreign affairs of Venezuela

Political offices
Preceded by Luis Alfonso Dávila	182nd Minister of Foreign Affairs of Venezuela; 30 May 2002 - 13 February 2004	Succeeded by Jesús Pérez
