= Miguel Ángel Burelli Rivas =

Venezuelan Italian politician and diplomat (1922–2003)

Minister of Foreign Affairs of Venezuela
- In office 2 February 1994 – 2 February 1999
- President: Rafael Caldera
- Preceded by: Fernando Ochoa Antich
- Succeeded by: José Vicente Rangel

Ambassador of Venezuela to the United States
- In office 1974–1976
- President: Carlos Andrés Pérez

Personal details
- Born: 8 July 1922 La Puerta, Venezuela
- Died: 22 October 2003 (aged 81) Washington, D.C., United States
- Profession: lawyer, diplomat, politician

Miguel Ángel Burelli Rivas (8 July 1922 – 22 October 2003), was a Venezuelan lawyer, diplomat and politician, presidential candidate in 1968 and 1973. He was Director General of the Ministry of Interior Affairs; and also Minister of Justice (in 1964) and Minister of Foreign Affairs, between 1994 and 1999. He was a candidate to be Secretary of the Organization of American States (OEA) in 1994.

== Biography ==
Burelli Rivas, was born in La Puerta, Venezuela. His father's ancestors came from the Italian island of Elba (Tuscany) in the 19th century.

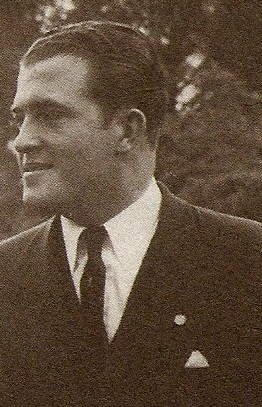
Miguel Angel Burelli in the early 1950s

He graduated as lawyer with a post-graduate degree in Political Sciences in University of Florence and a post-graduate degree in law from the University of Madrid, Spain. Miguel Angel Burelli spoke fluently Italian, English, French, Portuguese and of course Spanish.

He was forced into exile in Spain in the mid-1950s under Marcos Pérez Jiménez. There he married María Briceño Picón, daughter of writer & politician Mario Briceño Iragorry.

He served as Director of the National Electoral Council (CNE); Minister of Justice; Ambassador of Venezuela to the United States; Ambassador of Venezuela to Colombia; Ambassador of Venezuela to the United Kingdom. He successively ran for the Presidency of the Republic (1968 election and 1973 election). He was President of the Commission in charge of organizing the Third United Nations Conference on Maritime Law (1973–1974), Director of the Institute for Latin America Higher Studies of the Simón Bolívar University in Caracas) and also author of several famous books. He was a member of the Advisory Committee of the Foreign Affairs Ministry and Foreign Minister of Venezuela (1994–1999).

Miguel Angel Burelli also served as Director of the National Electoral Council (CNE); Minister of Justice; Ambassador of Venezuela to the United States and to Colombia & the United Kingdom.

He was Director General of the Ministry of Interior Affairs and -under the presidency of Rafael Caldera- was Minister of Foreign Affairs of Venezuela in 1994–1999.

Miguel Angel Burelli was author of several books:

Afirmación de Venezuela: itinerario de una inquietud (1971), La democracia en América Latina: frustraciones y perspectivas (1979), Caricatura de democracia (1990), Versiones y pasiones (1990), De la integración andina (1993), El asilo como derecho (1998).

After his death were published: Biografía del Cardenal Quintero (2005) and En Primera Persona, his autobiography edited in 2009.

He was a member of the Advisory Committee of the Foreign Affairs Ministry and worked successfully in Latin America when Foreign Minister of Venezuela (1994–1999).

== Personal life and death ==
After retiring from politics, he died peacefully on 10/22/2003 in Washington, D.C., USA, after suffering from lung cancer and cerebral hemorrhage.

== See also ==
- List of ministers of foreign affairs of Venezuela
- Los Notables

Political offices
Preceded by Fernando Ochoa Antich	179th Minister of Foreign Affairs of Venezuela; 2 February 1994 – 2 February 1999	Succeeded by José Vicente Rangel
