= Fernándo Ochoa Antich =

Venezuelan lawyer, diplomat and politician

Minister of Defense of Venezuela
- In office 26 June 1991 – 11 June 1992
- President: Carlos Andrés Pérez
- Preceded by: Héctor Jurado Toro
- Succeeded by: Iván Darío Jiménez Sánchez

Minister of Foreign Affairs of Venezuela
- In office 12 June 1992 – 2 February 1994
- President: Carlos Andrés Pérez (until '93); Ramón José Velásquez
- Preceded by: Humberto Calderón Berti
- Succeeded by: Miguel Ángel Burelli Rivas

Personal details
- Born: 12 September 1938 (age 87) Caracas, Venezuela
- Profession: General, lawyer, diplomat, politician

Fernando Antonio Ochoa Antich (born 12 September 1938) is a Venezuelan lawyer, diplomat and politician, and retired general. He is a columnist with the El Universal newspaper.

== Early life and education ==
Fernándo Ochoa Antich was born in 1938. He earned his law degree from Santa Maria University in 1989.

== Career ==
=== Ministry of Foreign Affairs ===
In 1991, president Carlos Andrés Pérez named him Minister of Defense of Venezuela.

As Minister of Defense, Ochoa Antich had to face several coup d'état attempts in 1992. In January 1992, he began to respond to rumors that there was a coup d'etat being planned by Hugo Chávez, then a major in the military. Despite Ochoa Antich's advice that the matter be addressed directly, Pérez dismissed the rumors. On February 3, 1992, Pérez returned from a trip to Switzerland, and when alerted about an uprising in Caracas, he neglected to inform Ochoa Antich, and instead went to rest, before moving several hours later to Miraflores Palace. Later that night, on February 4 a group of military men led by Chavez attempted a coup against Pérez. Chávez used tanks and paratroopers to take control of the palace and presidential residence. When dealing with the crisis, Ochoa Antich remained the loyal defense minister of Pérez. Although his actions resulted in quelling the conflict and saving the president's life, Ochoa Antich would later state that allowing Chávez to speak on public television was a "mistake," stating "I was responsible, I authored it, I was wrong," as it allowed Chávez to gain political success in the future over Perez.

=== Ministry of Foreign Affairs ===
In June 1992, Minister of Foreign Affairs of Venezuela Humberto Calderon Berti resigned when his Copei political party broke with Pérez's administration. Defense Minister General Ochoa Antich was named to the position as Berti's replacement on June 12, 1992, resigning from the Ministry of Defense.

After a trial concerning misappropriation of funds, the National Congress removed Pérez from office permanently on 31 August 1993. Ochoa Antich, however, retained his position in the Ministry of Foreign Affairs. He served as Minister of Foreign Affairs until February 2, 1994.

In 1994, when Ramón José Velásquez was named president, Ochoa Antich was named ambassador to Mexico. He continued to hold the position as of 1996. In 1998, he ran as a regional candidate for the governor elections of Zulia, but lost to Francisco Arias Cárdenas.

== See also ==
- Second presidency of Carlos Andrés Pérez
- List of ministers of foreign affairs of Venezuela
- List of ministers of defense of Venezuela
- List of foreign ministers in 1992
- List of foreign ministers in 1993
- List of foreign ministers in 1994

Political offices
Preceded by Héctor Jurado Toro	84th Minister of Defense of Venezuela; 26 June 1991 – June 1992	Succeeded by Iván Jiménez Sánchez
Preceded by Humberto Calderón Berti	178th Minister of Foreign Affairs of Venezuela; 12 June 1992 – 2 February 1994	Succeeded by Miguel Ángel Burelli Rivas
