= 1973 Venezuelan general election =

- 9 December 1973
- Presidential election
- Registered: 4,737,152
- Turnout: 96.50% (▼0.13pp)
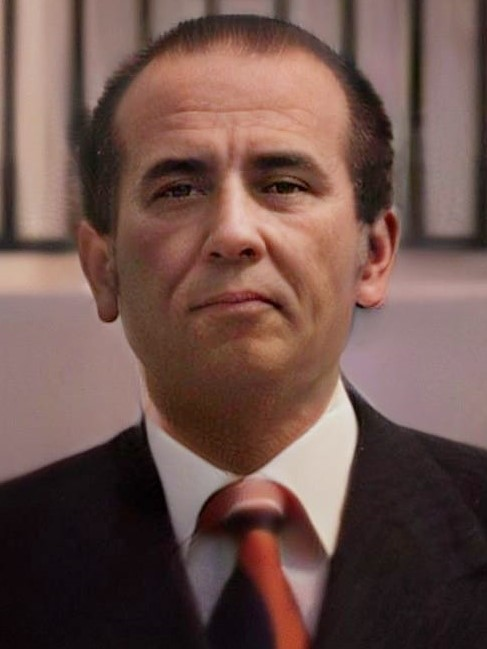

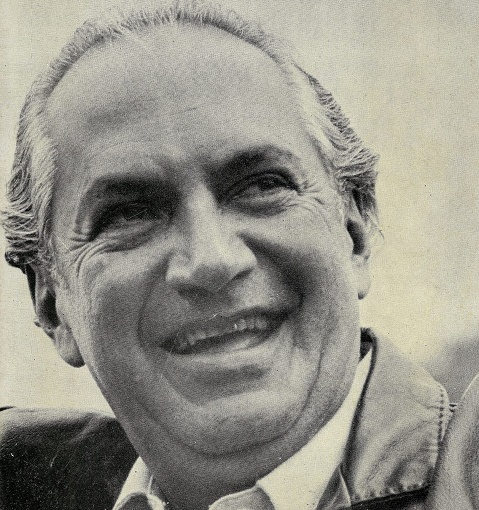

Nominee	Carlos Andrés Pérez	Lorenzo Fernández	Jesús Paz Galarraga
Party	Democratic Action	Copei	MEP—PCV
Popular vote	2,130,743	1,605,628	221,827
Percentage	48.71%	36.70%	5.06%
President before election
Rafael Caldera
Copei
Elected President
Carlos Andrés Pérez
Democratic Action

General elections were held in Venezuela on Sunday 9 December 1973. The presidential elections were won by Carlos Andrés Pérez of Democratic Action, who received 48.7% of the vote, whilst his party won a majority of seats in the Chamber of Deputies and Senate. Voter turnout was 96.5%.

== Results ==
=== President ===
Candidate	Party	Votes	%
Carlos Andrés Pérez	AD–PRN	2,130,743	48.71
Lorenzo Fernández	Copei–FDP–MPI	1,605,628	36.70
Jesús Paz Galarraga	MEP–PCV	221,239	5.06
José Vicente Rangel	Movement for Socialism	186,255	4.26
Jóvito Villalba	Democratic Republican Union	134,478	3.07
Miguel Ángel Burelli Rivas	National Opinion	33,977	0.78
Pedro Tinoco	PNI–MD	29,399	0.67
Martín Garcia	Democratic Socialist Party	11,965	0.27
Germán Borregales	National Action Movement	9,331	0.21
Pedro Segnini	Democratic National Front	6,176	0.14
Raimundo Verde Roja	Independent Democratic Movement	3,754	0.09
Alberto Solano	Emancipatory Force	1,736	0.04
Total		4,374,681	100.00
Valid votes		4,374,681	95.69
Invalid/blank votes		196,880	4.31
Total votes		4,571,561	100.00
Registered voters/turnout		4,737,152	96.50
Source: Nohlen

=== Congress ===
Party	Votes	%	Seats			
Party	Votes	%	Chamber	+/–	Senate	+/–
Democratic Action	1,955,439	44.44	102	+36	28	+9
Copei	1,330,514	30.24	64	+5	13	–3
Movement for Socialism	232,756	5.29	9	New	2	New
People's Electoral Movement	218,192	4.96	8	–17	2	–3
Nationalist Civic Crusade	189,667	4.31	7	–14	1	–3
Democratic Republican Union	140,462	3.19	5	–13	1	–2
Popular Democratic Front	54,759	1.24	0	–10	0	–1
Communist Party of Venezuela	52,754	1.20	2	New	0	New
Revolutionary Left Movement	44,012	1.00	1	New	0	New
National Opinion	32,751	0.74	1	+1	0	0
Integrationist National Party	30,618	0.70	1	New	0	New
Progressive Independents	27,528	0.63	0	New	0	New
Nationalist Unity Front	15,537	0.35	0	New	0	New
National Action Movement	12,588	0.29	0	–1	0	0
Democratic Socialist Party	12,238	0.28	0	New	0	New
Democratic National Front	11,313	0.26	0	–4	0	–1
Popular Movement	8,324	0.19	0	New	0	New
19 other parties	30,313	0.69	0	–	0	–
Total	4,399,765	100.00	200	–14	47	–5
Valid votes	4,399,765	96.23				
Invalid/blank votes	172,422	3.77				
Total votes	4,572,187	100.00				
Registered voters/turnout	4,737,152	96.52				
Source: Nohlen
