= Cristóbal Fernández Daló =

Cristóbal Fernández Daló is a Venezuelan politician who served as president of Congress between 1996 and 1998. After his leadership in the Movimiento al Socialismo (MAS) party, he served as secretary general of Progressive Advance.

== Biography ==
Fernández Daló was a senator for the Movimiento al Socialismo, becoming in 1996 the first left-wing politician to preside over Congress, following the alliance of National Convergence, MAS, and Radical Cause, promising an alliance with President Rafael Caldera. Independent senator Freddy Muñoz, former secretary general of MAS, opposed his appointment, alleging accusations of corruption.

Fernández Daló became secretary general of Progressive Advance. He was executive secretary of the Democratic Unity Roundtable.
