= Pedro Pablo Aguilar =

Venezuelan politician

Pedro Pablo Aguilar (San Lázaro, Trujillo, June 23, 1929 – September 21, 2022) was a Venezuelan politician, lawyer, and academic. He was a founding member of COPEI and served as its secretary‑general, as well as a deputy and senator in Congress for four decades, holding the presidency of the Senate between 1998 and 1999.

== Biography ==
Aguilar joined the Christian Democratic party COPEI in 1946 and graduated as a lawyer from the Central University of Venezuela (UCV) in 1955. He was imprisoned during the dictatorship of Marcos Pérez Jiménez until his overthrow on January 23, 1958.

After the end of the dictatorship, he successfully ran for deputy to Congress for COPEI, becoming a signatory of the 1961 constitution and later serving on the Agriculture Commission of the Chamber of Deputies, where he was head of his party's parliamentary faction. He served as secretary‑general of COPEI for eight years on two separate occasions.

As a senator, he was a member of the Comisión para la Reforma del Estado (COPRE). Pedro Pablo Aguilar had confrontations with Rafael Caldera after the latter withdrew his support from Douglas Dáger, Oswaldo Álvarez Paz, and Eduardo Fernández, aligning himself within a COPEI faction with Pepi Montes de Oca and Luis Herrera Campíns. He chaired the Electoral Command for Álvarez Paz's presidential campaign in 1993, which was lost. At the end of his career, he served as President of the Senate between 1998 and 1999.

He was also a professor of Political Science at the UCV and at the Andrés Bello Catholic University (UCAB), as well as a founder of the Christian Democratic Training Institute (Ifedec) alongside Arístides Calvani, Enrique Pérez Olivares, and Valmore Acevedo Amaya.
