= Steve Ellner =

American historian and political scientist

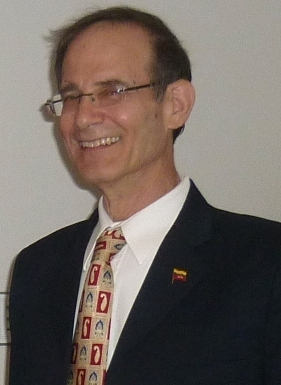
- Ellner, July 2011
- Occupation(s): Professor, historian

Steve Ellner is an American professor who taught economic history and political science at the Universidad de Oriente (UDO) in Puerto La Cruz, Venezuela from 1977 to 2003. He is the author of numerous books and journal articles on Venezuelan history, political parties, and organized labor.

As of 2025, Ellner is on the advisory board of Science & Society: A Journal of Marxist Thought and Analysis and is an Associate Managing Editor of the journal Latin American Perspectives: A Journal on Capitalism and Socialism.

== Education and academic career ==
Ellner has a PhD from the University of New Mexico in Latin American history.

Ellner taught economic history and political science at the Universidad de Oriente Venezuela beginning in 1977. He has been a visiting professor at the Central University of Venezuela, Georgetown University, Duke University, Universidad de Buenos Aires, and Tulane University (in 2015). He has also been a visiting professor at St. John Fisher College in Rochester, NY (2001), the Australian National University (2013) and has taught at the School of International and Public Affairs of Columbia University (2011) and Johns Hopkins University (2012).

He has been described by the Financial Times as a "leftist historian" and a "leftist political scientist", and by The Rocky Mountain Peace and Justice Center's "Peace Train" in the Colorado Daily as a "U.S. radical who taught history in Venezuela for 26 years".

== Affiliations, contributions and appearances ==
Ellner is on the advisory board of Science & Society: A Journal of Marxist Thought and Analysis. Since January 2019, he is an Associate Managing Editor of the journal Latin American Perspectives: A Journal on Capitalism and Socialism.

In a 2025 debate over the government of Nicolás Maduro published in Latin American Perspectives, Ellner is included among leftists who have defended Maduro.

Ellner is a contributor at Code Pink, Common Dreams (where he also co-writes with Medea Benjamin of Code Pink), Green Left, In These Times, MintPress News, Monthly Review, North American Congress on Latin America (NACLA), Rebelion.org, Venezuelanalysis, and ZNetwork.

At Democracy Now! Ellner has several appearances.

== Books ==
Ellner is the author of numerous books and journal articles on Venezuelan history, political parties, and organized labor. Many of his academic works have been translated and published in Spanish.

- Los partidos políticos y su disputa por el control del movimiento sindical en Venezuela, 1936-1948 (Universidad Católica Andrés Bello, 1980).
- The Venezuelan Petroleum Corporation and the Debate over Government Policy in Basic Industry (University of Glasgow, 1987).
- Venezuela's Movimiento al Socialismo: From Guerrilla Defeat to Electoral Politics (Duke University, 1988). ISBN 0-8223-0808-8
- Generational Identification and Political Fragmentation in Venezuelan Politics in the Late 1960s (University of Akron-Allegheny, 1989).
- Organized Labor in Venezuela, 1958-1991: Behavior and Concerns in a Democratic Setting (Scholarly Resources, 1993). ISBN 0-8420-2443-3
- The Latin American Left: From the Fall of Allende to Perestroika, co-editor with Barry Carr (Westview, 1993). ISBN 0-8133-1200-0
- Venezuelan Politics in the Chávez Era: Class, Polarization and Conflict, co-editor with Daniel Hellinger (Lynne Rienner, 2003). ISBN 1-58826-108-5
- Neoliberalismo y Anti-Neoliberalismo en América Latina: El debate sobre estrategias. (Editorial Tropykos, 2006). ISBN 980-325-302-6
- Venezuela: Hugo Chávez and the Decline of an “Exceptional” Democracy,” co-editor with Miguel Tinker Salas (Rowman and Littlefield, 2007). ISBN 978-0-7425-5455-9
- Rethinking Venezuelan Politics: Class, Conflict and the Chávez Phenomenon (Lynne Rienner, 2008). ISBN 978-1-58826-560-9
- El fenomeno Chávez: sus orígenes y su impacto (Editorial Tropykos, 2011). ISBN 978-980-724-837-2. Second edition: CELARG, 2014. ISBN 978-980-399-052-7
- Latin America’s Radical Left: Challenges and Complexities of Political Power in the Twenty-First Century, editor (Rowman & Littlefield, 2014). ISBN 978-1-4422-2949-5
- Latin America’s Pink Tide: Breakthroughs and Shortcomings, editor (Rowman & Littlefield, 2020). ISBN 9781538125632
