= San José de Barlovento =

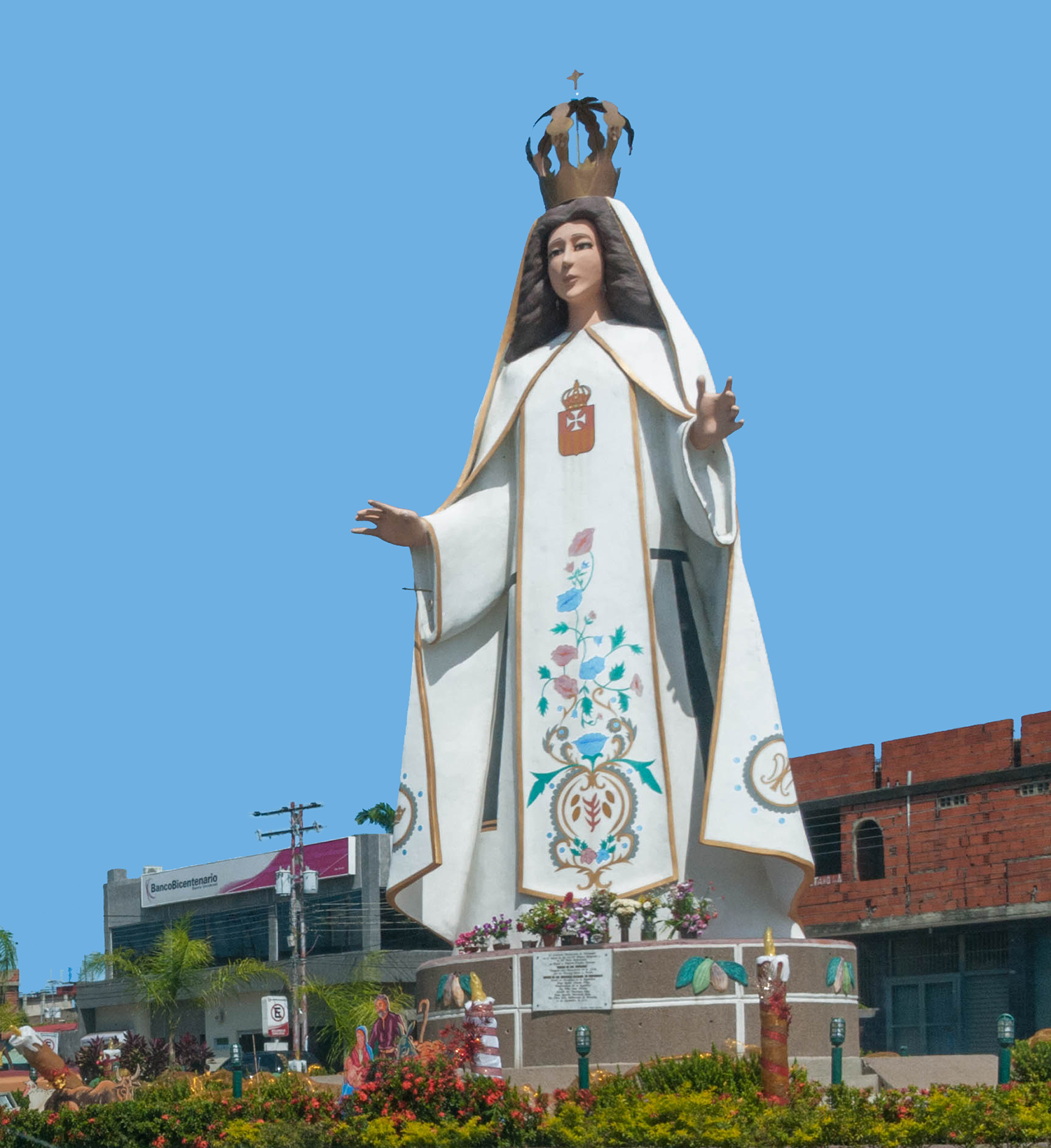

- Coat of arms
- Nickname: Barlovento
- Location within Venezuela
- Coordinates: 10°18′03″N 66°59′36″W
- Country: Venezuela
- State: Miranda
- Municipality: Andrés Bello Municipality, Miranda
- Founded: 1846

Government
  - Mayor: David A. Sojo
- Elevation: 16 m (52 ft)

Population
  - Demonym: Barloventeño/a
- Time zone: VST
- Climate: Aw

San José de Barlovento (formerly San José de Río Chico) is a city in the state of Miranda, Venezuela. It is the capital of Andrés Bello Municipality, which was established as an autonomous municipality in 1982.

Andrés Bello Municipality is largely agricultural; a 2024 agricultural census recorded about 2,668 hectares under cultivation, with cacao, plantain and cassava among the main crops.
