= Pompeyo Márquez =

Venezuelan politician

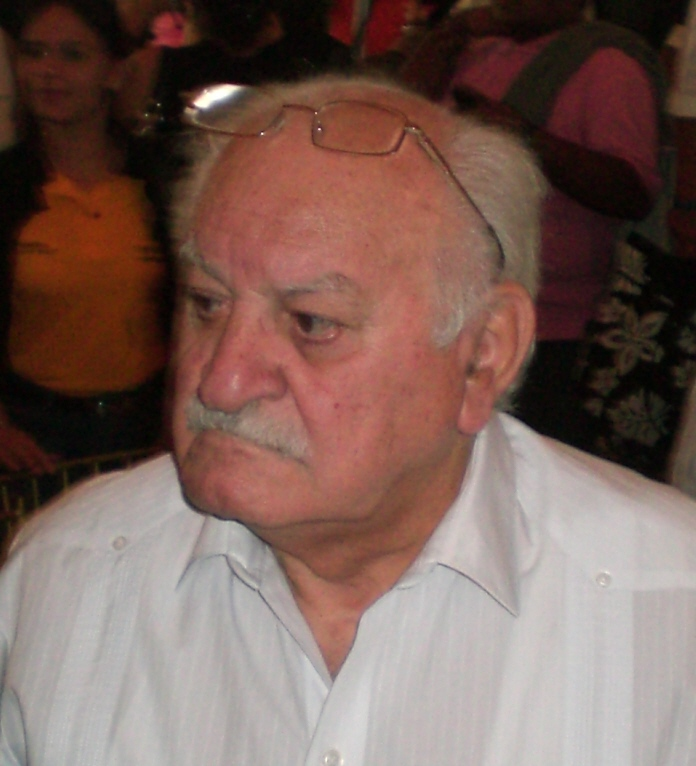
- Pompeyo Márquez in 2008
- Born: Pompeyo Ezequiel Márquez Millán; 28 April 1922; Ciudad Bolívar, Venezuela
- Died: 21 June 2017 (aged 95); Caracas, Venezuela

Pompeyo Ezequiel Márquez Millán (28 April 1922 – 21 June 2017) was a Venezuelan politician and former Marxist guerrilla member in the 1960s. He was one of the founders of Movimiento al Socialismo (MAS), and part of the opposition to the late Venezuelan president Hugo Chávez. In the 1980s he was a member of the Comisión para la Reforma del Estado (COPRE). In 1989, he was appointed by Carlos Andrés Pérez as a member of the Presidential Committee for Colombian-Venezuelan Border Issues (COPAF) chaired by Ramón J. Velásquez. He was Minister of Borders of the Government of Rafael Caldera from 1994 through 1999.

He died on 21 June 2017, at the age of 95.

== See also ==
- List of Venezuelans
