= National Action Movement (Venezuela) =

Defunct far-right political party in Venezuela

National Action Movement Movimiento de Acción Nacional
- Abbreviation: MAN
- Founder: Germán Borregales
- Founded: 15 May 1960
- Dissolved: 1973
- Headquarters: Caracas
- Ideology: Nationalism; Anticommunism; Third Position; Catholicism
- Political position: Far-right

The National Action Movement (Spanish: Movimiento de Acción Nacional or MAN) is a defunct Venezuelan political party.

== History ==
The MAN was established by the right-wing journalist Germán Borregales in 1960. It was very much a personal party of Borregales, reflecting his beliefs and having little existence outside of its leader. Both the party and its leader have been characterised as far right.

The party contested the 1963 general election but did not elect any candidates. In 1968 the group contested both the general and Presidential elections, with Borregales their candidate for the Presidency. Although he came bottom of the poll with 0.3% of the vote the party did manage to have a member elected to the Chamber of the National Assembly. This seat was occupied by Borregales himself. They contested both elections again in 1973 and, whilst Borregales's vote share fell to 0.2%, he finished ahead of three other candidates. However the National Assembly seat was lost. During each presidential campaign Borregales campaigned only sporadically and focused most of his attention on the Assembly seat. The party contested no further elections.
