= Tal Cual =

Venezuelan newspaper

- Claro y raspao

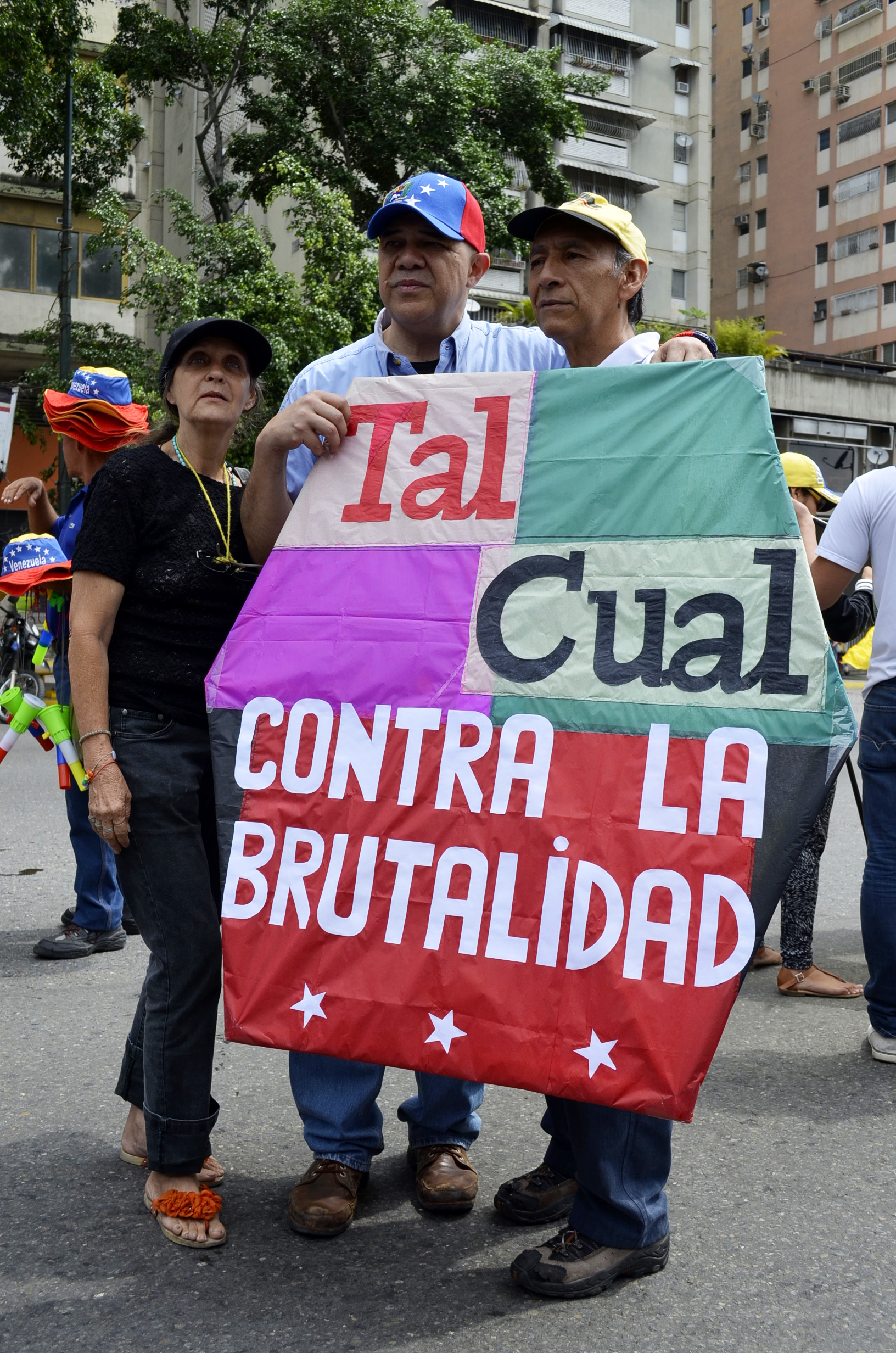
- Logo of Tal Cual on a kite by Rafael Araujo
- Type: Daily newspaper. Website
- Owner: La Mosca Analfabeta C.A.
- Founder: Teodoro Petkoff
- Associate editor: Laureano Márquez
- Cartoonist: Roberto Weil
- Founded: April 3, 2000; 26 years ago
- Language: Spanish
- Headquarters: Caracas, Venezuela
- Country: Venezuela
- Website: www.talcualdigital.com

Tal Cual is a Venezuelan newspaper. It was launched in 2000, with Teodoro Petkoff as editor. It has been described as a leftist newspaper that is critical towards the Venezuelan government.

== History ==
It was founded as a printed newspaper in 2000 by Teodoro Petkoff, who remained as director until his death in 2018. The newspaper initially received financial assistance from the Czech-Venezuelan businessman Hans Neumann, owner of The Daily Journal. Neumann was president, until his death in 2001, of the board of directors of La Mosca Analfabeta C.A., the publishing house of Tal Cual. At first, Tal Cual was an afternoon newspaper, but later became a morning one.

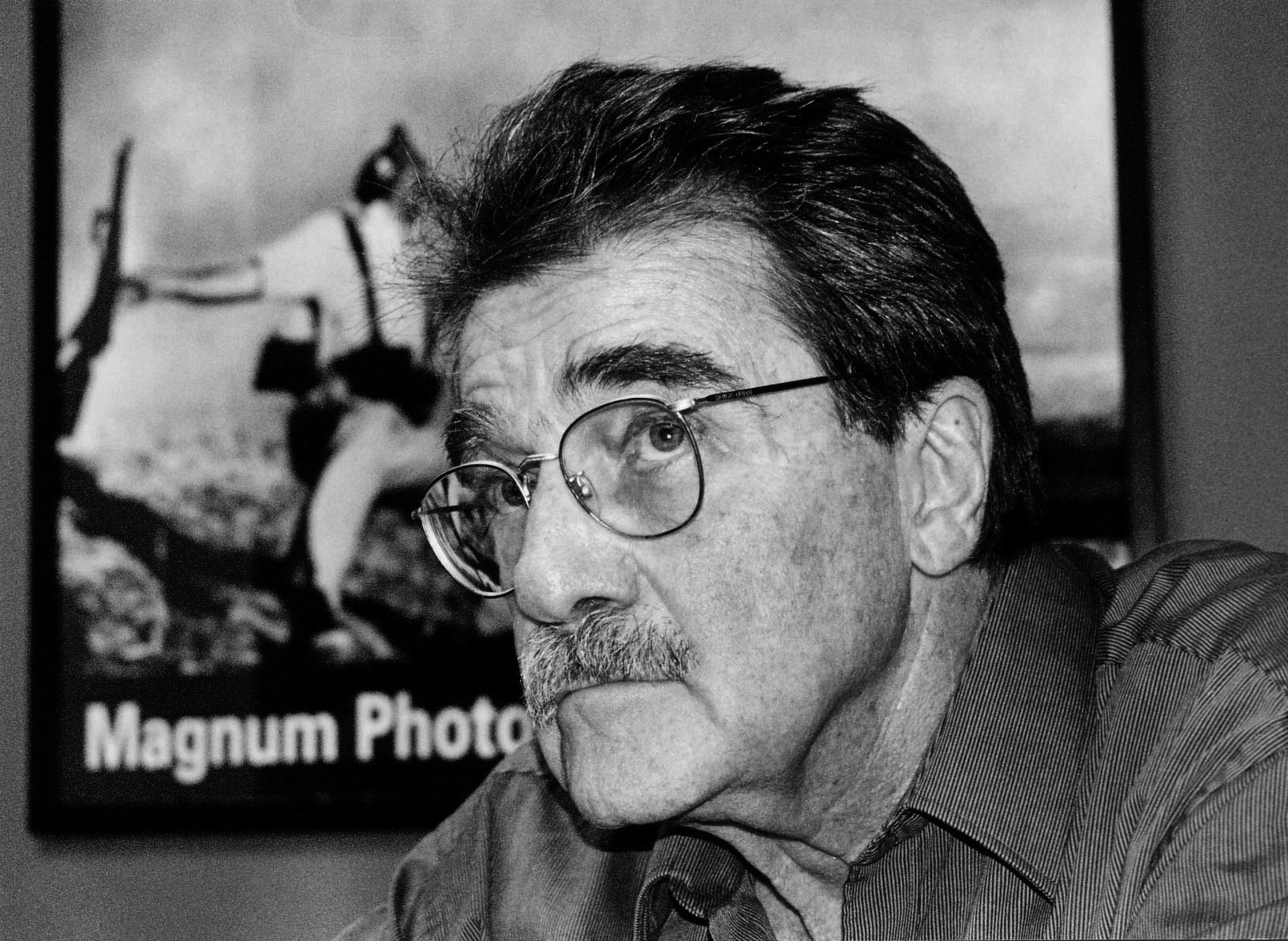
Teodoro Petkoff in the offices of Diario Tal Cual.

In November 2005, the humorist Laureano Márquez wrote a satirical column in the newspaper consisting of a letter addressed to the daughter of President Hugo Chávez, Rosinés Chávez, asking her for help, saying "You children have a lot of power, and I know that your dad listens to you". The column referred to the fact that, according to Chávez, Rosinés was the person who had the idea of changing the orientation of the horse on the coat of arms of Venezuela, which was modified in 2006 so that it would gallop to the left. As a result of the publication, the newspaper was sanctioned with a fine of 18,604 dollars. The fine nearly bankrupted Tal Cual, but it organized a public collection and managed to pay it.

On 1 October 2014, the newspaper announced that the Últimas Noticias group unilaterally broke a commercial agreement that had allowed Tal Cual to be printed and distributed by that publishing house for the previous three years. Because of that, Tal Cual hired the company Impresiones News Printer for its printing and El Nacional took charge of its distribution.

As a consequence of the shortages in Venezuela, Tal Cual was on the verge of ceasing to circulate on 23 October 2014, due to the lack of newsprint. A few days before the deadline, the editors of Tal Cual reached an agreement with Editorial Alfredo Maneiro for the purchase of enough rolls of paper to print the newspaper for one more month. Editorial Alfredo Maneiro is a state-owned company that centralizes the import of newsprint in Venezuela.

On 27 January 2015, the newspaper announced that it would end its daily publication on 27 February 2015 and that it would become a weekly starting on 28 February 2015. Tal Cual alleges as reasons for the change the economic situation of the country, which affects the newspaper's finances, together with the shortage of paper and the refusal of Editorial Alfredo Maneiro to allow the purchase of paper in order to print copies. To this was added pressure from the Venezuelan government, which includes seven lawsuits in 15 years of existence and pressure on advertisers not to contract advertising in Tal Cual.

In November 2017 the weekly Tal Cual announced that it would stop circulating in print, as it had become impossible to procure the paper necessary for printing. «Since September 2016 this medium has barely received four rolls of paper to be able to be printed. That is equivalent to barely two weekly issues. The Chavista publications do receive paper from Corporación Maneiro, as do the media that have aligned themselves with the communicative hegemony. We did not do so and we are not going to do so», says the editorial note that accompanied the decision. Since then, the medium has consolidated itself as a digital platform.
