= Aníbal Nazoa =

Venezuelan writer and journalist

Aníbal Nazoa (1928–2001) was a Venezuelan writer and journalist.

== Published works ==
- 1969: Aquí hace calor (It's hot here)
- 1969: Obras incompletas (Incomplete works)
- 1973: Las artes y los oficios (The arts and crafts)
- 1981: La palabra de hoy (The word for today)
