= Luis Beltrán Prieto Figueroa =

Venezuelan politician (1902–1993)

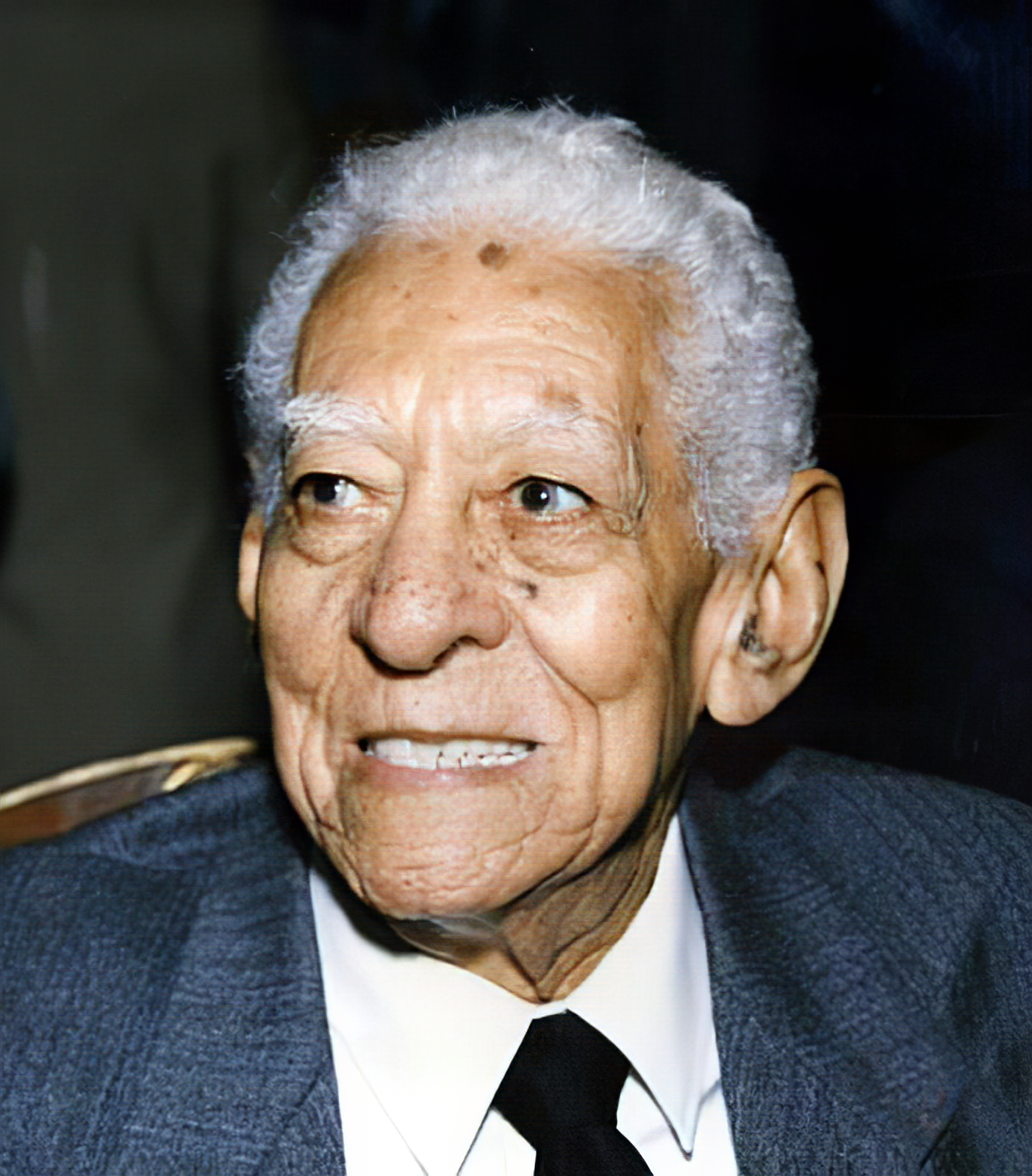

President of the Senate of Venezuela
- In office 1962–1967
- President: Rómulo Betancourt; Raúl Leoni
- Preceded by: Raúl Leoni
- Succeeded by: Luis Augusto Dubuc

Personal details
- Born: 14 March 1902 La Asunción, Nueva Esparta
- Died: 22 April 1993 (aged 91) Caracas, Venezuela
- Party: Democratic Action, People's Electoral Movement
- Profession: politician
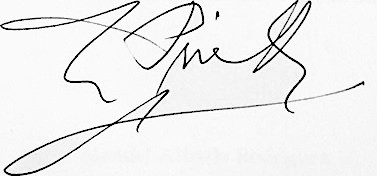
- Signature

Luis Beltrán Prieto Figueroa (14 March 1902 – 22 April 1993), was a Venezuelan politician. A founder of Democratic Action and minister of education in its first government (1947–1948), he was a leader of Democratic Action after the restoration of democracy in 1958. He split from Democratic Action in 1967 when it tried to prevent his victory in district-level primary elections for the 1968 presidential race translating into Prieto Figueroa winning the nomination. He and a substantial group of supporters split from AD and founded the People's Electoral Movement, which he led until his death.

== Career ==
After completing a doctorate in political and social sciences at the Central University of Venezuela (1934), he became engaged in politics, and was a senator from 1936 to 1941. He was a founding member of party Acción Democrática (AD, Democratic Action), and minister of education under Rómulo Gallegos (1947-8). After the 1948 coup he went into exile, working for UNESCO in Costa Rica and Honduras (1951-8), after a professorship at the University of Havana (1950-1). Returning from exile after the end of the dictatorship of Marcos Pérez Jiménez in 1958, he was again elected senator (1959–1969). During this time he was Secretary General of AD (1958-9), President of the Venezuelan Senate from 1962 to 1967, and President of AD (1963–67).

In 1967 Prieto Figueroa campaigned to be the party's presidential candidate for the 1968 Venezuelan presidential election; a Democratic Action convention was to be held in September 1967 which would choose the candidate. Previous practice had been for convention members to be chosen by a process where local party committees chose representatives for state conventions, and these chose state representatives for the national convention. However in spring 1967 the party decided to hold primary elections at local level, with district representatives to district conventions elected by the mass membership instead of party committees. The Rómulo Betancourt faction supported Gonzalo Barrios, considering Prieto too far left. Prieto Figueroa split from AD over the affair along with a substantial number of his supporters, founding the People's Electoral Movement. As its candidate in the 1968 election he gained nearly 20% of the vote, coming fourth in a close election (COPEI's Rafael Caldera won with 29%). However Prieto's subsequent electoral run, in the 1978 Venezuelan presidential election (the party endorsed Jesús Ángel Paz Galarraga in 1973), achieved only just over 1%.

== Books ==
- Las ideas no se degüellan (1980)
- Pido la palabra (1982)
- Mi hermana María Secundina y otras escrituras (1984)
