= Américo Martín =

Venezuelan politician (1938–2022)

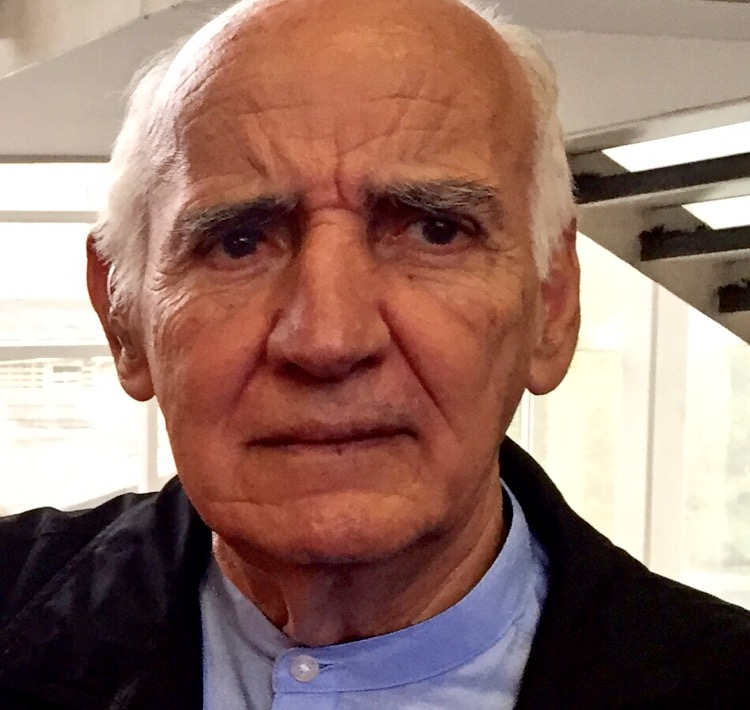
- Martín in 2015

Member of the Venezuelan Chamber of Deputies
- In office 23 January 1979 – 23 January 1988

Personal details
- Born: Américo Gregorio Martín Estaba; 1 February 1938 Caracas, United States of Venezuela
- Died: 17 February 2022 (aged 84) Caracas, Venezuela
- Party: Acción Democrática (AD), Movimiento de Izquierda Revolucionario (MIR), Independiente

Américo Gregorio Martín Estaba (1 February 1938 – 17 February 2022) was a Venezuelan politician.

He served in the Venezuelan Chamber of Deputies from 1979 to 1988.

He died in Caracas on 17 February 2022, at the age of 84, from COVID-19, during the COVID-19 pandemic in Venezuela.
