= Senate (Venezuela) =

Upper house of Venezuela's legislature

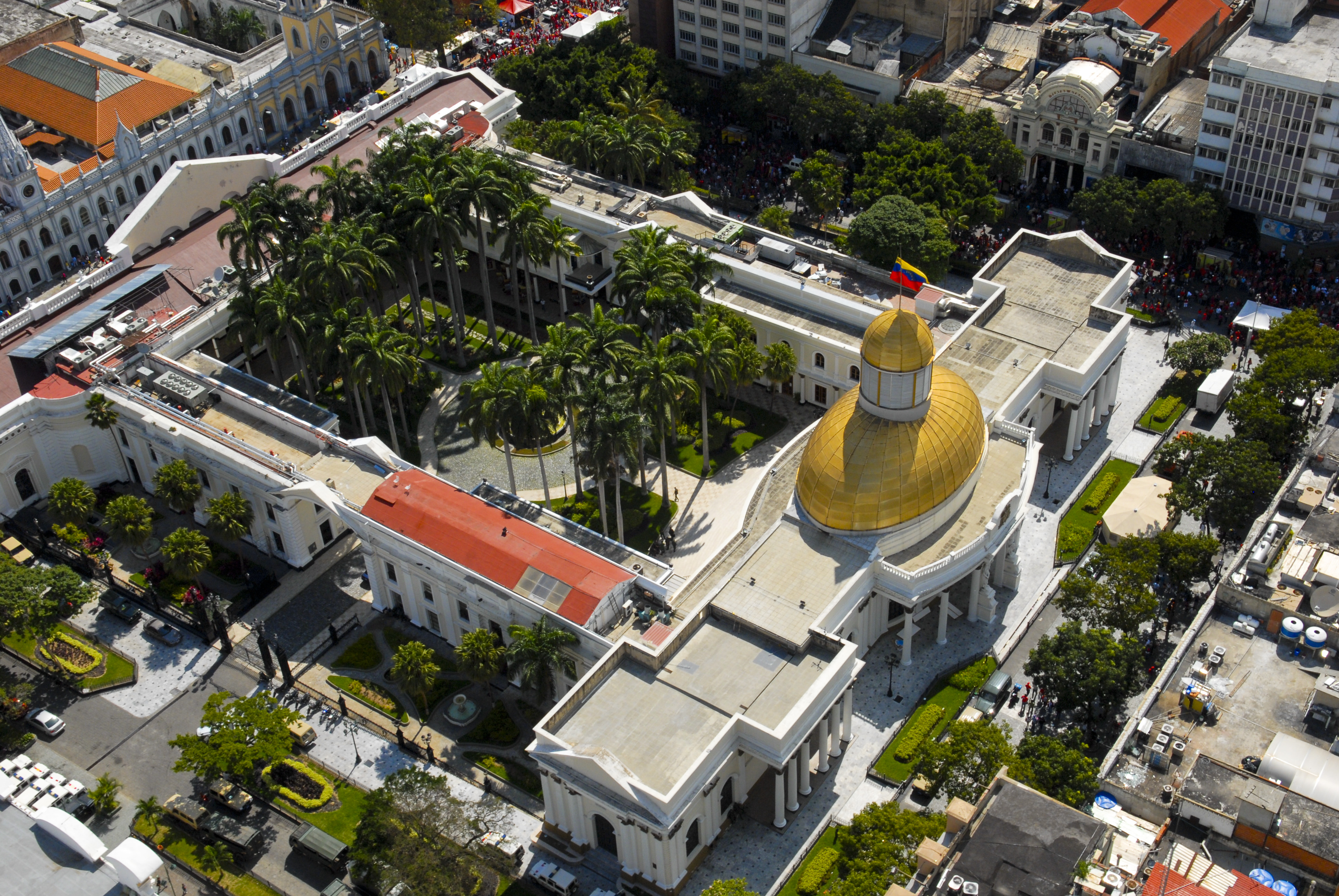
Palacio Federal Legislativo

The Senate of Venezuela was the upper house of Venezuela's legislature under its 1961 constitution. Under the 1999 constitution, the bicameral system was replaced by the unicameral National Assembly of Venezuela. However, since 1999 the former chamber of senators has been used by the National Assembly for solemn meetings and other special functions.

In Venezuela, lifetime Senate seats existed from 1961 to 1999. The former Presidents who held this position were: Rómulo Betancourt (1964–1981), Raúl Leoni (1969–1972), Rafael Caldera (1974-1994 and 1999–2000), Carlos Andrés Pérez (1979–1989, 1989–1993, 1993-1997 and 1999–2000), Luis Herrera Campins (1984–2000) and Jaime Lusinchi (1989–1999).

At the Senate's last election in 1998, it had 54 elected members (48 elected two per state plus 6 additional to get a more proportional result) and 3 lifetime senators.

== Presidents of the Senate ==
Primary sources:

President	Tenure	Party
Carlos R. Travieso	1958-1959	Independent
Raúl Leoni	1959-1962	Acción Democrática
Luis Beltrán Prieto Figueroa	1962-1965	Acción Democrática
Luis Augusto Dubuc	1965-1968	Acción Democrática
Armando Vegas	1968-1969	COPEI
José Antonio Pérez Díaz	1969-1974	COPEI
Gonzalo Barrios	1974-1979	Acción Democrática
Godofredo González	1979-1984	COPEI
Reinaldo Leandro Mora	1984-1989	Acción Democrática
Octavio Lepage	1989-1990	Acción Democrática
David Morales Bello	1990-1991	Acción Democrática
Pedro París Montesinos	1991-1993	Acción Democrática
Octavio Lepage	1993-1994	Acción Democrática
Eduardo Gómez Tamayo	1994-1996	National Convergence
Cristóbal Fernández Daló	1996-1998	Movimiento al Socialismo
Pedro Pablo Aguilar	1998-1999	COPEI
Luis Alfonso Dávila	1999	Movimiento V República

== See also ==
- National Assembly (Venezuela), Unicameral legislature of Venezuela since 2000
- Venezuelan Chamber of Deputies, Lower house of Venezuela 1961-1999
