= Teodoro Petkoff =

Venezuelan politician (1932–2018)

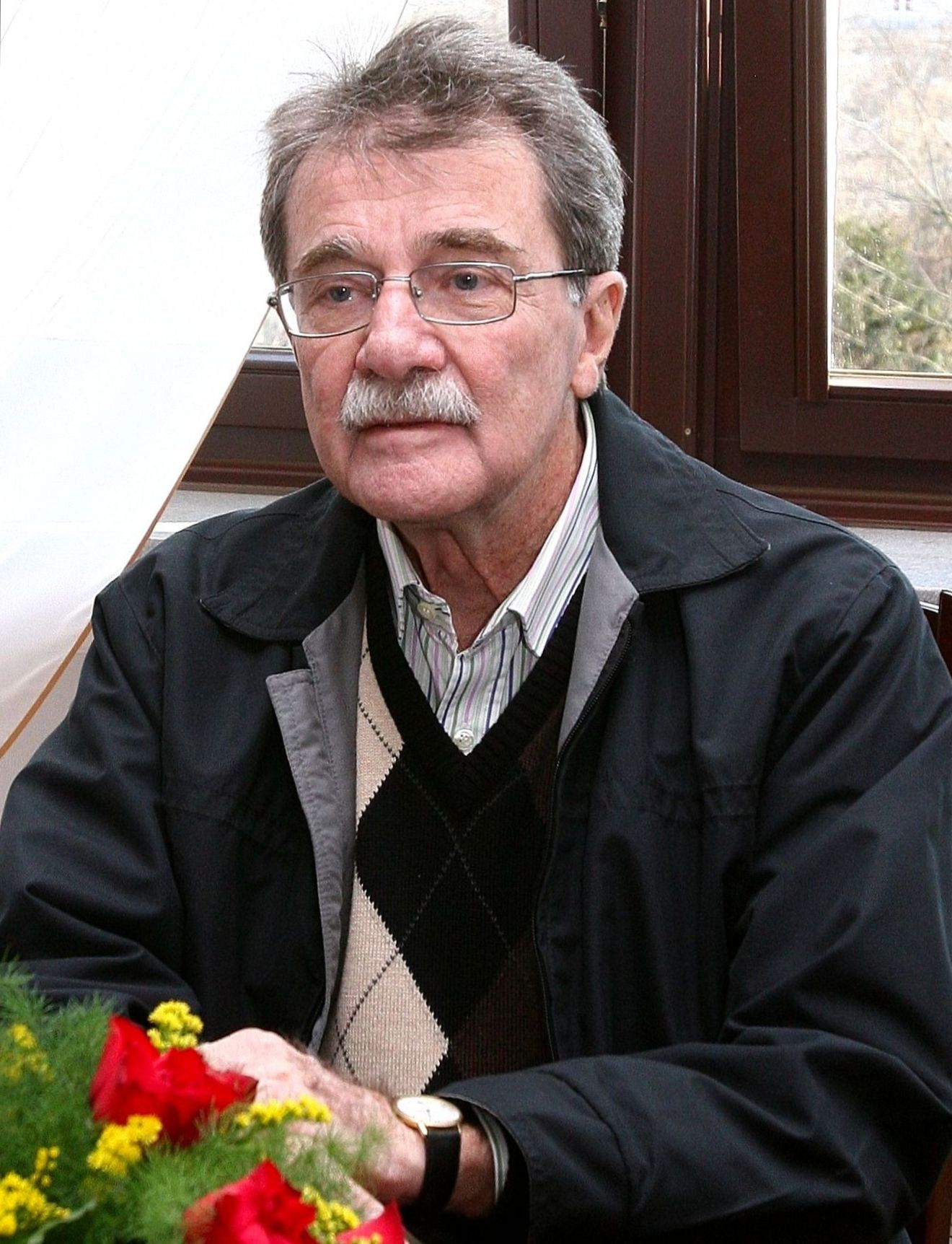

Minister of the Central Office of Coordination and Planning (Cordiplan)
- In office 1996–1999

Personal details
- Born: Teodoro Petkoff Malec; 3 January 1932 Bobures, Zulia State
- Died: 31 October 2018 (aged 86) Caracas, Venezuela
- Party: MAS
- Education: Central University of Venezuela
- Profession: Politician, Journalist

Teodoro Petkoff Malec (Spanish pronunciation: [teoˈðoɾo peðˈkof maˈlek]; 3 January 1932 – 31 October 2018) was a Venezuelan politician, economist and journalist. One of Venezuela's most prominent politicians on the left, Petkoff began as a communist but founded the democratic socialist Movement Toward Socialism party after the 1968 Warsaw Pact invasion of Czechoslovakia. Petkoff was elected as senator and ran for the presidency twice in the 1980s, being defeated both times. As Minister of Planning, he oversaw President Rafael Caldera's adoption of liberalization economic policies in the mid-1990s. He was a prominent critic of President Hugo Chávez and was a candidate to run against him in the 2006 presidential election until he dropped out four months before the vote to support Manuel Rosales. Petkoff launched the newspaper Tal Cual in 2000 and remained its editor until his death in 2018.

== Life and career ==
=== Early years ===
His father was a Bulgarian immigrant and his mother was a Pole of Jewish origin. He received a Bachelor degree in Economics from the Central University of Venezuela (UCV) where he also served as a professor for 14 years. In the 1950s he was member of the student resistance against the dictator Marcos Pérez Jiménez and was imprisoned on several occasions. In the 1960s, along with his brother Luben Petkoff he was a guerrilla fighter under the command of Douglas Bravo against the government of Rómulo Betancourt. Later, he joined the Communist Party of Venezuela (PCV).

In 1971, Petkoff left the PCV to found, along with other dissidents, the Movement Towards Socialism (MAS), after the 1968 Warsaw Pact invasion of Czechoslovakia. He was a member of Congress and twice an unsuccessful candidate for president, gaining 4% in the 1983 presidential election and 3% in the 1988 presidential election.

=== Minister of Rafael Caldera ===
In the second government of Rafael Caldera (1994–1999), MAS was in coalition with the centrist National Convergence party of Caldera, along with other left-wing parties such as the Communist Party of Venezuela (PCV) and the MEP, and other right-wing parties as the National Movement of Integration. Petkoff served as Minister of the Central Office of Coordination and Planning (Cordiplan), directing the government's economic policies. From Cordiplan, Petkoff managed the Venezuela Agenda, a neo-liberal government program for reducing the size of the public administration, controlling inflation and stopping the currency devaluation, while administering social programs aimed at improving the population's nutritional health and providing "children-mother" services for the poorest.

=== Opponent of Hugo Chávez ===
In 1998, Petkoff left the MAS because he was against its support of Hugo Chávez's candidacy (see) in the 1998 Presidential election. He left the political world and became a journalist, working as a director of El Mundo. Afterward, he founded his own newspaper, Tal Cual. Tal Cual has been outspoken in its criticism of both Chavismo and those who supported the 2002 coup attempt against Chávez.

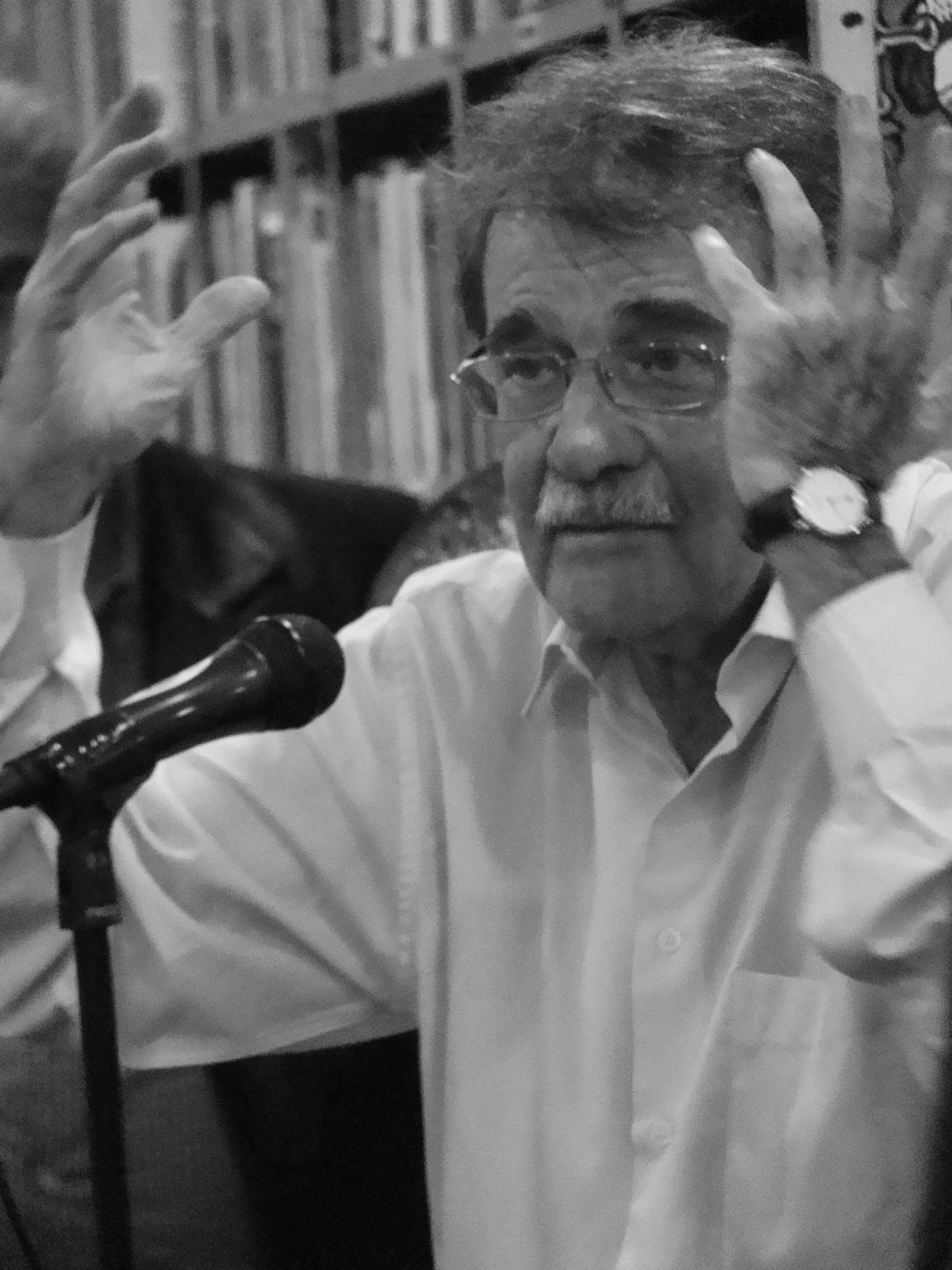
Teodoro Petkoff in Caracas

Petkoff wrote several political books. In 2005 he published The Two Lefts (Las dos izquierdas, Alfadil Editor, Hogueras Collection) where he analyzed the resurgence of left-wing politics in Latin America. Petkoff argued that there was a sharp difference between the governments of Luiz Inácio Lula da Silva, Néstor Kirchner, and Ricardo Lagos, compared to the governments of Chávez and Castro, which he characterises as similar. The main ideas can be read in an article published in the journal New Society (Nueva Sociedad) in Spanish.

On 21 April 2006, after rumours indicating that a number of intellectuals and middle-class liberal activists had asked him to run in the 2006 Presidential election, Teodoro Petkoff launched his campaign to be the next president of Venezuela. In a short televised message he explained his reasons and asked Venezuelans to follow his lead in the construction of what he described as a new, better Venezuela. On 4 August 2006, Petkoff dropped out of the presidential race. Five days after dropping out of the race, he endorsed Manuel Rosales, former governor of Zulia State, for the presidency.

In July 2008 the Inter-American Dialogue published a paper by Petkoff about Venezuela under Chávez, saying "Chávez's Venezuela is a Bonapartist democracy of sorts, a one-of-a-kind 'dictatorship.' He aims to make the armed forces the institutional base of his power."

In an October 2012 interview, Petkoff noted that while Venezuela under Chávez retained certain democratic institutions, such as political parties and the electoral process, he described other aspects of democracy, such as "the full exercise of freedom of expression," as being "very beleaguered" under Chávez. He said that "Chávez has more fascist than socialist elements, unless we speak of Stalinism: the cult of violence and death, contempt for opponents, singing to the past, and so on."

=== Personal life ===
On 12 May 2012, Petkoff and his wife were mugged by an armed man on a motorcycle after leaving a Caracas restaurant. In December 2012, while on the island of Margarita, Petkoff suffered a fall and sustained injuries that required surgery. Petkoff died on 31 October 2018.

== Works ==
- "Checoslovaquia: El Socialismo como problema". (Monte Ávila Editores: 1969,1990) ISBN 980-01-0295-7
- "¿Socialismo para Venezuela?" (Editorial Domingo Fuentes: 1970).
- "Razón y pasión del socialismo: el tema socialista en Venezuela" (Editorial Domingo Fuentes: 1973)
- "Proceso a la izquierda: O de la falsa conducta revolucionaria." (Planeta: 1976) ISBN 84-320-2509-7
- "Del optimismo de la voluntad: Escritos políticos" (Centauro: 1987) ISBN 980-263-073-X
- "Por qué hago lo que hago" (Alfadil: 1997) ISBN 980-354-050-5
- (with Raúl Huizzi) "Venezuela en la encrucijada" (Universidad de los Andes: 1998) ISBN 980-11-0280-2
- "Una segunda opinión: La Venezuela de Chávez: un libro hablado con Ibsen Martínez y Elías Pino Iturrieta." (Grijalbo: 2000) ISBN 980-293-211-6
- "Hugo Chávez, tal cual" (Catarata: 2000) ISBN 84-8319-142-3
- "Las Dos Izquierdas" (Alfadil: 2005) ISBN 980-354-170-6
- "The two lefts: A new South-American revolution" Published by Matthew Clark and Daniel Petkoff 2006
- "El chavismo como problema" (Libros Marcados: 2010) ISBN 980-6933-71-0
- "El chavismo al banquillo: Pasado, presente y futuro de un proyecto político" (Editorial Planeta: 2011) ISBN 978-958-42-2581-8

== See also ==
- Presidents of Venezuela
- Political prisoners in Venezuela
