= Movimiento al Socialismo (Venezuela) =

Political party in Venezuela

Movement for Socialism Movimiento al Socialismo
- Leader: Leopoldo Puchi
- Founder: Teodoro Petkoff
- Founded: 1971
- Split from: Communist Party of Venezuela
- Headquarters: Caracas, Venezuela
- Ideology: Democratic socialism Social democracy
- Political position: Centre-left to left-wing
- Continental affiliation: COPPPAL
- International affiliation: Progressive Alliance; Socialist International (formerly)
- Seats in the Latin American Parliament: 0 / 12
- Seats in the National Assembly: 0 / 277
- Governors of States of Venezuela: 0 / 23
- Mayors: 2 / 337

Website
- http://www.masvenezuela.com.ve/

The Movement for Socialism (Spanish: Movimiento al Socialismo, or MAS) is a democratic socialist political party in Venezuela.

== History ==
MAS was founded in 1971, with a view to emphasising a socialist message. Initially led by Teodoro Petkoff, its first congress was held on 14 January 1971. In 1988 another left-wing party, the Movement of the Revolutionary Left, merged with MAS.

In the 1970s to the 1990s, members of MAS hoped that the party would become the third largest political force, challenging the dominant Social Christian and Democratic Action parties. However, the party often won less than 5% of the vote. At the 1993 election it supported the National Convergence coalition which successfully backed Rafael Caldera, contributing 10.59% of the vote, a third of Caldera's total. At the parliamentary elections the same year it achieved a high-water mark of 5 Senators and 24 Deputies.

1983 MAS election poster, with presidential candidate Teodoro Petkoff

MAS initially supported the government of Hugo Chávez in 1998. Petkoff disagreed with this decision and left the party. Disagreements between MAS and Chávez subsequently emerged, and MAS joined the opposition.

In the legislative elections of 30 July 2000, the party won 21 out of 165 seats in the National Assembly. Its current leaders include Leopoldo Puchi, Felipe Mújica and Carlos Tablante.

In the period since 1989, when state governors have been directly elected, the party has won state governorships in Delta Amacuro, Lara, Portuguesa, Sucre (Ramón Martínez) and Zulia. Some of his past members included: Pompeyo Márquez, Rafael Guerra Ramos and Carlos Tablante.

== Presidential candidates supported ==
Elections where MAS backed the winning candidate shown in bold

- 1973 election: José Vicente Rangel (4.26%)
- 1978 election: José Vicente Rangel (5.18%)
- 1983 election: Teodoro Petkoff (4.17%)
- 1988 election: Teodoro Petkoff (2.71%)
- **1993 election: Rafael Caldera** (independent, backed by the coalition Convergencia, MAS contributing 10.59% of vote)
- **1998 election: Hugo Chávez** (Fifth Republic Movement candidate, MAS contributing 9.00%)
- **2000 election: Hugo Chávez** (Fifth Republic Movement candidate, MAS contributing 8.70%)
- 2006 election: Manuel Rosales (A New Era candidate, MAS contributing 0.61%)
- 2012 election: Henrique Capriles (A Democratic Unity Roundtable candidate)
- 2013 election: Henrique Capriles (A Democratic Unity Roundtable candidate)
- 2018 election: Henri Falcón (A Progressive Advance candidate)
- 2024 election: Edmundo González Urrutia (Unitary Platform candidate)

MAS is a member of Socialist International, and a member of COPPPAL.

== See also ==
- Douglas Bravo and his FALN guerilla faction had been expelled from the Communist Party in 1965, forming the Party of Venezuelan Revolution.
