= Gustavo Gomez Lopez =

Gustavo Gómez López
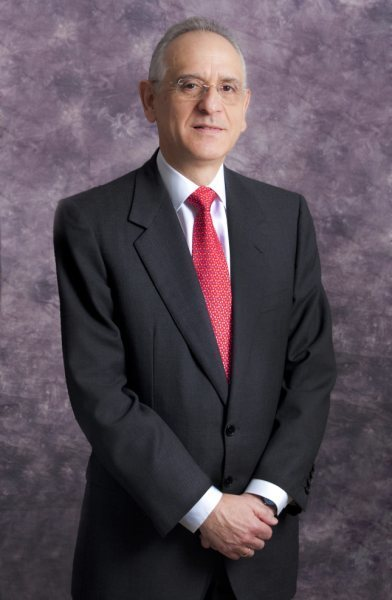
- Born: January 7, 1951 (age 75); Venezuela, Caracas
- Education: Law at the Andrés Bello Catholic University
- Occupations: Lawyer, businessman and banker
- Spouse: Claudia Febres Cordero Salóm (1982-present)
- Parent(s): Rubén Darío Gómez Rodríguez and Agustina Soledad López Albertí
- Website: https://gomezlopez.com/

Gustavo Adolfo Gómez López (Caracas, Venezuela, January 7, 1951) is a Venezuelan lawyer, banker and businessman of Spanish ancestry. Founder of the law firm Gómez López & Asociados, he was president of Banco Latino and its group of companies until 1994. Currently, he practices his profession and is a member of the boards of directors of several media outlets and insurance companies.

== Biography ==
Gustavo Gómez López was born in El Recreo, Caracas on January 7, 1951. He is the youngest of eight children of Rubén Darío Gómez Rodríguez, originally from Upata, Bolívar State, Venezuela, and Agustina Soledad López Alberti, from Barcelona, Spain. Gómez López studied law at Andrés Bello Catholic University in Caracas, graduating in 1974.

He has a son named Gustavo Ignacio Gomez Gomez. In 1982, he married Claudia Febres Cordero Salom.

== Professional activity ==
During his university years, Gómez López served as a student representative on the Faculty of Law Council and the University Council. He began his career in the financial and insurance sectors under the guidance of his brother, Rubén Gómez López, who served as Superintendent of Insurance and Reinsurance in the 1970s. He received training at Seguros Ávila and General de Seguros.

In 1973, he participated in the presidential electoral campaign as the head of youth for the Movimiento Desarrollista (Pro-Development Movement) led by Pedro R. Tinoco Jr. In 1974, he joined the legal department of Banco de Venezuela under the leadership of Carmelo Lauría Lesseur. In 1976, he served as a legal consultant for CORPOINDUSTRIA, a government-owned financial institution.

In 1977, he joined SUDAMERIS, which later became Banco Latino C.A., under the leadership of Pedro R. Tinoco Jr. Gómez López went on to found and serve as the inaugural president of Arrendadora Latino, a financial leasing company, and played a key role in the establishment of Latino de Seguros. He also held the presidency of Banco Hipotecario de Occidente and, in September 1992, was elected president of Banco Latino by the Shareholders' Assembly, following a nomination by Pedro R. Tinoco Jr.

He developed innovative financing programs for national and international contractors during his tenure as vice-president of Banco Latino, in collaboration with the Venezuelan Oil Chamber and the PDVSA subsidiaries Lagoven and Maraven. By 1992, Banco Latino had secured the largest market share in the industry, excelling both in routine banking transactions and the management of social benefit trusts. Through an innovative banking kiosk program, Banco Latino established facilities in key locations, including major oil fields, state-owned enterprises, large corporations, PDVSA (Petróleos de Venezuela) headquarters, and embassies, notably the U.S. Embassy.

Gómez López was instrumental in the establishment of Banco Latino de Colombia and Société Financière de Bastion in Geneva, Switzerland. He also held the position of president at Banco Latino branches in both Miami and Curaçao.

In recognition of his leadership, the World Economic Forum named him one of its Global Leaders for Tomorrow in November 1993.

By December 1994, Banco Latino had emerged as the top recipient of savings deposits and ranked second in total deposits, while the Latino Group had grown into the largest conglomerate within the national financial sector.

== The financial crisis of 1994 ==
The 1994 financial crisis in Venezuela was a pivotal event that deeply affected the country's financial system. Banco Latino faced a significant run on deposits, driven by intense political pressure and a sustained campaign of misinformation targeting Gómez López and his predecessors. In an effort to stabilize the situation, Gustavo Gómez López stepped down as president of the bank in November 1993.

In December 1993, Rafael Caldera was elected president of Venezuela. Soon after, on January 16, 1994, the interim government under Ramón J. Velásquez intervened Banco Latino and shut it down for more than 80 days. The intervention was driven by a deep-rooted economic crisis that had crippled much of the financial system, compounded by the government's initial and outright refusal to provide Banco Latino financial cover amidst escalating political tensions.

Banco Latino was the only bank denied financial aid in 1994. This decision by the Central Bank of Venezuela triggered the largest financial crisis in the country's history.

In the aftermath, Gómez López and his wife, Claudia Febres Cordero, faced a barrage of sweeping accusations in Venezuela, Curaçao, and Miami. The charges in Venezuela included:

- Fraudulent credit authorizations to affiliated entities.
- Issuance of documents with the intent to conceal acts of embezzlement.
- Preparation, endorsement, and dissemination of materially inaccurate financial statements.
- Ongoing fraudulent misappropriation or diversion of public funds.
- Breach of fiduciary duties and obligations.
- Preparation, endorsement, certification, submission, or dissemination of falsified financial statements and account balances.
- Criminal conspiracy.
- Persistent engagement in fraudulent activities.
- Unlawful possession of a restricted or prohibited war weapon.

In Curaçao, they faced a monumental $1 billion lawsuit, which remains, even today, as the largest legal action ever recorded on the island. Meanwhile, in Miami, Florida, a separate lawsuit was launched under the Racketeer Influenced and Corrupt Organizations Act (RICO), accusing them of extensive fraud, embezzlement, breach of fiduciary duties, and a host of other charges.

These actions were heavily publicized by President Rafael Caldera both in Venezuela and abroad. The intervention board even enlisted an American advertising agency to spread their narrative. However, after more than seven years of intense litigation, costing the Venezuelan treasury millions of dollars, Gómez López and his wife ultimately prevailed in all cases across multiple jurisdictions, proving their innocence in Venezuela, the United States, and Curaçao.

After vindicating their innocence, they pursued sanctions proceedings in U.S. courts against FOGADE and its attorneys under Rule 11 and for malicious prosecution. In both instances, they secured favourable outcomes, culminating in confidential settlement agreements.

Banco Latino Internacional stands as the only EDGE Act bank in Florida's financial history to emerge from voluntary Chapter 11 proceedings (back in 1994) in order to shield itself from a run on deposits. Remarkably, BLI repaid 100% to its depositors and creditors.

According to the financial analysis in the book Anatomía de una Muerte Inducida by economist and former Venezuelan Minister of Finance Pedro Rosas Bravo, the Venezuelan state recovered 100% of the resources FOGADE invested in the intervention, entirely from the financial group's own assets, and loan portfolio.

== Personal life ==
Gómez López and his wife, Claudia Febres Cordero, practice law as advisors for various companies and individuals, and serve on several boards in Venezuela and around the world.

== Recognitions and awards ==
Throughout his career, Gómez López has received numerous accolades at regional, national, and international levels, including:

=== Regional ===
• Order of September 16, First Class (September 11, 1982).

• Order of Doctor Tulio Febres Cordero, First Class (May 31, 1991).

• Order of José Félix Ribas, First Class (February 17, 1992).

• Order of the City of Mérida (August 1992).

• Order of José Tadeo Monagas (November 1992).

=== National ===
• Order of Merit for Work, Second and First Class.

• Order of Francisco de Miranda, Second (1987) and First Class (1990).

• Cross of Land Transit (July 1, 1988).

=== International ===
• Key to the City of Miami (July 15, 1993).

• Key to the City of Coral Gables (July 1993).

=== Guilds ===
• Associate Member of the La Salle Natural Sciences Society (December 3, 1990).

== See also ==
- Fugitive bankers case
