= Pedro Tinoco =

Venezuelan businessman and politician

Minister of Finance of Venezuela
- In office 1969–1972
- President: Rafael Caldera
- Preceded by: Francisco Mendoza
- Succeeded by: Luis Enrique Oberto

Personal details
- Born: Pedro Rafael Tinoco Jimenez, Jr. October 4, 1927 Caracas, Venezuela
- Died: March 30, 1993 (aged 65) Denver, Colorado, US
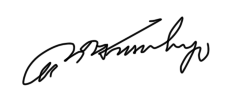
- Signature

Pedro Tinoco (1927–1993) was a Venezuelan businessman and politician.

== Career ==
Tinoco was Minister of Finance from 1969 to 1972, under President Rafael Caldera. He was then chairman of the Board of Banco Latino from 1975, and one of Carlos Andrés Pérez's "Twelve Apostles".

He resigned in 1989 to take on the presidency of the Central Bank of Venezuela. Under Tinoco's chairmanship of the central bank, interest rates were liberalised with little effective banking supervision, and Banco Latino, which in 1988 was the central bank's largest debtor, went from the country's fifth-largest to second-largest bank. Banco Latino was the first bank to fail in the Venezuelan banking crisis of 1994.

He was a candidate in the 1973 Venezuelan presidential election, in which he was one of four candidates claiming the backing of Marcos Pérez Jiménez; he won less than 1% of the vote.

Pedro Tinoco was also a professor of Public Finance and Political Economy at Universidad Central de Venezuela.

Tinoco was the son of the Pedro Tinoco Smith who was Minister of Interior (1931–35) in the government of Juan Vicente Gómez. Tinoco Sr created the law firm Escritorio Tinoco in 1914; Tinoco Jr would later take over the firm and along with his partners make it "a powerful player in the Venezuelan legal market".
