= Banco Latino =

Bank in Caracas, Venezuela (1950–1994)

- Company type: Bank
- Industry: Financial services
- Founded: 1950
- Defunct: 1994
- Headquarters: Caracas, Venezuela
- Key people: Pedro Tinoco

Banco Latino was a bank based in Caracas, Venezuela and at the time of its 1994 failure was the country's second largest. It had a good relationship with the government, such that ministries moved their accounts to the bank, and the army and the state-owned oil company PDVSA entrusted their pension funds to Latino trust managers. Latino built a new high-rise headquarters, and expanded aggressively, both within Venezuela and overseas.

== History ==
Banco Latino was a Venezuelan bank founded as Banco Frances e Italiano para la America del sur (French: Banque Francaise-Italienne pour Amerique du Sud, lit. 'Franco-Italian Bank of South America') on 17 February 1950 with Venezuelan headquarters in Caracas. Since 1967 adopted the name Banco Latinoamericano de Venezuela and finally was named BANCO LATINO on 7 February 1975. Its first Board was chaired by Rafael Pizani (1950–1952), followed by Nicholas Dominici (1952-1955), Elbano Adriani (provisional 1955-1956), Luis Geronimo Pietri (1956–1965) and Enrique Benedetti (1966–1974).

The Bank was controlled initially by a pool of French banks and the Banca Commerciale Italiana in Milan, with a CEO (the most famous was the French Jahn) and his vice presidents (as Pompeo D'Ambrosio) who did executive functions of "technical" financial management. Since 1974, Pedro Tinoco, former Minister of Finance of the first government of Rafael Caldera, was named president of the Bank. Under his tenure the name was changed to the institution, first to "Banco Latinoamericano de Venezuela" and then to "Banco Latino".

With Pedro Tinoco managing the Bank began to be politicized, despite strong opposition from the managers like D'Ambrosio (related to the original French and Italian banks that founded the bank in the fifties), who were 'technical' experts in banking issues. In that period, the Franco-Italian Bank "Sudameris", still maintained a 20% stake, which it sold in 1990 (when started to appear clearly a terrible crisis for the bank).

However in the late 1970s, during the first administration of former President Carlos Andrés Pérez, the Banco Latino became known as the bank of the "12 apostles". Indeed were called as "apostles" a group of businessmen who were very close to the government. Their fortunes were related to public works contracts, trade, industry, banking and media.

After leading the bank for over 15 years and expand it to all economic sectors, in February 1989, at the beginning of the second government of Carlos Andrés Pérez, Pedro Tinoco was appointed chairman of the Central Bank of Venezuela. During the almost four years that Tinoco led the Central bank, Banco Latino rose from fifth to second place among commercial banks in Venezuela and to the top in Venezuelan and savings deposits.

But failed ventures in real estate and stock market investment saw Tinoco desperate to raise funds from depositors, and in 1993 it paid 105% interest on one-year certificates of deposit, more than double Venezuela's 1993 inflation rate of 46%. Between October 1993 and January 1994 it experienced a bank run, and was then taken over by the government; its operations were ultimately acquired by Interbank. Within weeks of the government takeover, arrest warrants had been issued for 82 of its directors and managers. Four months later, only 6 had been apprehended, with the rest believed to have escaped abroad. These included Bank Conglomerates, Gustavo Cisneros, Edwin Acosta-Rubio and Gustavo Gómez López who were the bank top executives. The New York Times reported in 1994 that

Late last fall, when Banco Latino officials began to realize that their house of cards was collapsing, they started transferring hundreds of million of dollars overseas. In the final frenetic days, one bank director foresaw judicial orders on freezing assets and sold his million-dollar mansion, Another officer, Folco Falchi, the bank's coordinator for international investments, was reportedly seen loading suitcases stuffed with dollars into his corporate jet on the Caribbean island of Curacao. After the authorities padlocked Banco Latino on Jan. 14, bank officers, operating from offshore refuges, entered the bank's computer electronically with a modem and erased and altered thousands of records.

However, after almost ten years of international litigation, all plaintiffs and directors of Banco Latino were declared innocent of criminal charges, and all suits brought against them were dismissed without prejudice. All rulings are firm and final, in all jurisdictions. It was proven through verifiable court documents that the Venezuelan government never had a case against Banco Latino or its directors and managers to begin with.

== Bibliography ==
- Escalante, Ricardo. DE LA CAÍDA DE PÉREZ A LA CAÍDA DEL LATINO. Editorial Vadell Hermanos Caracas, Venezuela.
- Faraco Francisco & Suprani Romani. M. LA CRISIS BANCARIA VENEZOLANA. Editorial Panapo C.A. Caracas, Venezuela.
- Gustavo García. LECCIONES DE LA CRISIS BANCARIA DE VENEZUELA EDICIONES IESA. Caracas, Venezuela.
- Rafael Del Naranco. EL MONO DE LA BARAJA y THE CARD JOCKER Editorial de Investigaciones Periodísticas EDINPE. Miami, FL, USA.
- Ordóñez, Rosana. LA CASA DEL ODIO. Editorial Planeta. Caracas, Venezuela.
- Rodriguez Valdez, Angel. LATINO PECADO CAPITAL. Editorial Pomaire. Caracas, Venezuela.PDF
- Pantin, Guillermo. LATINOMAFIA. Editorial Pomaire. Caracas, Venezuela.
- Méndez Cuevas, Olindo. LA ACTIVIDAD BANCARIA EN VENEZUELA. Caracas. Venezuela.
- Jesús Ramón Quintero. LOS JUECES SUSPECTUS. Caracas. Venezuela
- Rafael Quintero Moreno, Jorge Rosell Senhenn y otros. LOS DELITOS ECONOMICOS. Editorial Vadell Hermanos. Caracas. Vaenezuela.
- BCV 60 años – TESTIMONIOS. Ediciones Banco Central de Venezuela. Caracas. Venezuela.
- Velásquez Ramón. J., Silva Carlos Rafael. EL EJECUTIVO NACIONAL Y LA INTERVENCIÓN DEL BANCO LATINO. Talleres Gráficos de Joaquín Ibarra/ Impresores. Caracas, abril de 1994.
- Zapata, Juan Carlos. DR. TINOCO. VIDA Y MUERTE DEL PODER EN VENEZUELA. Colección Claroscuro. Caracas 2006
- García Mendoza, Oscar. CRÓNICA INVOLUNTARIA DE UNA CRISIS INCONCLUSA. Compilación de artículos y conferencias. Voces del Presidente. Editorial Planeta
- Gómez López Gustavo. CINCO NORMAS Y UNA REGLA DE ORO para manejar una crisis financiera. BIBLIOGRAPHY OF DOCUMENTS IN THE CENTER FOR THE STUDY OF CENTRAL BANKS COLLECTION. Caracas, Venezuela: Spring, 1995
