= Aura Celina Casanova =

Venezuelan politician

Aura Celina Casanova was a Venezuelan politician, the first woman in Venezuela to be appointed to the Cabinet.

== Career ==
In 1968 President Raúl Leoni appointed her Minister of Economic Development, a position she held until 1969. She was succeeded by Luis Enrique Oberto.
