= Luis Enrique Oberto =

Venezuelan politician (1928–2022)

President of the Venezuelan Chamber of Deputies
- In office 1990–1994
- Preceded by: José Rodríguez Iturbe
- Succeeded by: Carmelo Lauría Lesseur

Member of the Venezuelan Chamber of Deputies
- In office 1979–1999
- Constituency: Miranda

Minister of Finance
- In office 1972–1974
- President: Rafael Caldera
- Preceded by: Pedro Tinoco
- Succeeded by: Héctor Hurtado Navarro

Minister of Planning
- In office 1969–1972
- President: Rafael Caldera
- Preceded by: Aura Celina Casanova
- Succeeded by: Antonio Casas González

Personal details
- Born: 19 August 1928
- Died: 8 August 2022 (aged 93) Caracas, Venezuela
- Party: COPEI
- Education: Central University of Venezuela

Luis Enrique Oberto González (19 August 1928 – 8 August 2022) was a Venezuelan banker and politician who served in several high-ranking positions within the government of Venezuela. A member of COPEI, Oberto was a member of the Venezuelan Chamber of Deputies from 1979 to 1999, serving as the president of the Chamber of Deputies from 1990 until 1994. Oberto also served as the Minister of Finance and the Minister of Planning in the government of Rafael Caldera. He then served in a number of academic positions after leaving politics.

== Early life and financial career ==
Oberto was born on 19 August 1928. In 1951, he graduated from the Central University of Venezuela with a degree in civil engineering. In 1969, newly-elected president Rafael Caldera appointed Oberto as Minister of Planning; in this position, the U.S. Department of State considered him to be one of Venezuela's most senior government officials. From 1969 until 1972, Oberto served on the board of governors of the Inter-American Development Bank, and he also served as the principal director of the Central Bank of Venezuela from 1970 to 1972.

In 1972, Caldera appointed Oberto as Minister of Finance. In this role, Oberto oversaw the expansion of the Venezuelan oil industry; Oberto increased fiscal participation in oil and led the nationalization of Venezuela's oil and gas reserves. As a result of Oberto's policies while minister, the Venezuelan economy had an "average growth of 5%, with peaks of 7.6% in 1970 and 6.9% in 1973", while the average annual inflation was 3.3%. Oberto resigned as Minister of Finance in 1974 following the election of President Carlos Andrés Pérez.

Following his resignation, Oberto served in several governmental and business roles. In 1974, Oberto served as a member of the Presidential Commission for Oil Reversal, and later that year, he became an advisor for the Inter-American Development Bank. From 1974 to 1978, he was also on the board of directors of the Central Mortgage Bank.

== Political career ==
In 1978, Oberto, a member of COPEI, was elected to the Chamber of Deputies where he subsequently served for the following twenty years. During his tenure in the legislature, Oberto also served in several high-ranking positions. In the late-1980s, he was a member of the Commission for the Reform of the State, a presidential commission which sought to reform the Venezuelan government.

In 1990, Oberto was elected the president of the Chamber of Deputies, a position he would hold until 1994. In 1993, Oberto briefly served as the interim president of the Congress of Venezuela, which consisted of both the Chamber of Deputies and the Senate of Venezuela. Oberto left parliament in 1999. In 1995, Oberto drafted the Organic Criminal Procedure Code (COPP), a reform of Venezuela's criminal justice system, which he believed was too "inquisitorial". The COPP reforms were later adopted in 1999 by the government of Hugo Chávez.

== Later life ==
After leaving the legislature, Oberto held several academic positions. In 1999, he became a professor at the Central University of Venezuela. From 1998 until 2000, Oberto served as the president of the National Academy of Economic Sciences, an institution he founded in 1982. Oberto served as a member of the board of directors of the Institute of Advanced Studies in Administration from 2000 to 2003. At some point, Oberto was also the vice president of the College of Engineers of Venezuela.

Oberto died in Caracas on 8 August 2022, eleven days before his 94th birthday.
