= Universidad Nacional Experimental del Táchira =

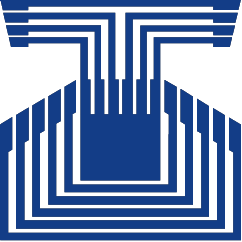
- Type: Public
- Established: February 27, 1974
- Rector: Raúl Alberto Casanova Ostos (2014-Present)
- Students: 8,240 (Approximately)
- Location: San Cristóbal, Táchira, Venezuela
- Colors: White and Blue
- Nickname: UNET
- Website: www.unet.edu.ve

The Universidad Experimental del Táchira, also known as Universidad del Táchira or UNET, is a public university founded on February 27, 1974 in San Cristóbal, Táchira, Venezuela. Recently, the university has 8,240 students among undergraduate and graduate students and 686 professors.

The UNET is an institution of high academic level for undergraduate and graduate students who seek for a Bachelor's degree, Master's degree, and PhD. Committed to the positive transformation of the Tachira state and the country, and whose ideal is to increase and develop the social capital area of the university and the state to increase and develop their popularity and credibility among Venezuela and Latin America. Also, to improve the development of the intellectual capital of the university in order to achieve its basic functions: teaching, extension, and research. As well as its employees and students' credibility to guarantee the quality of its educational services as academic institution.

== History ==
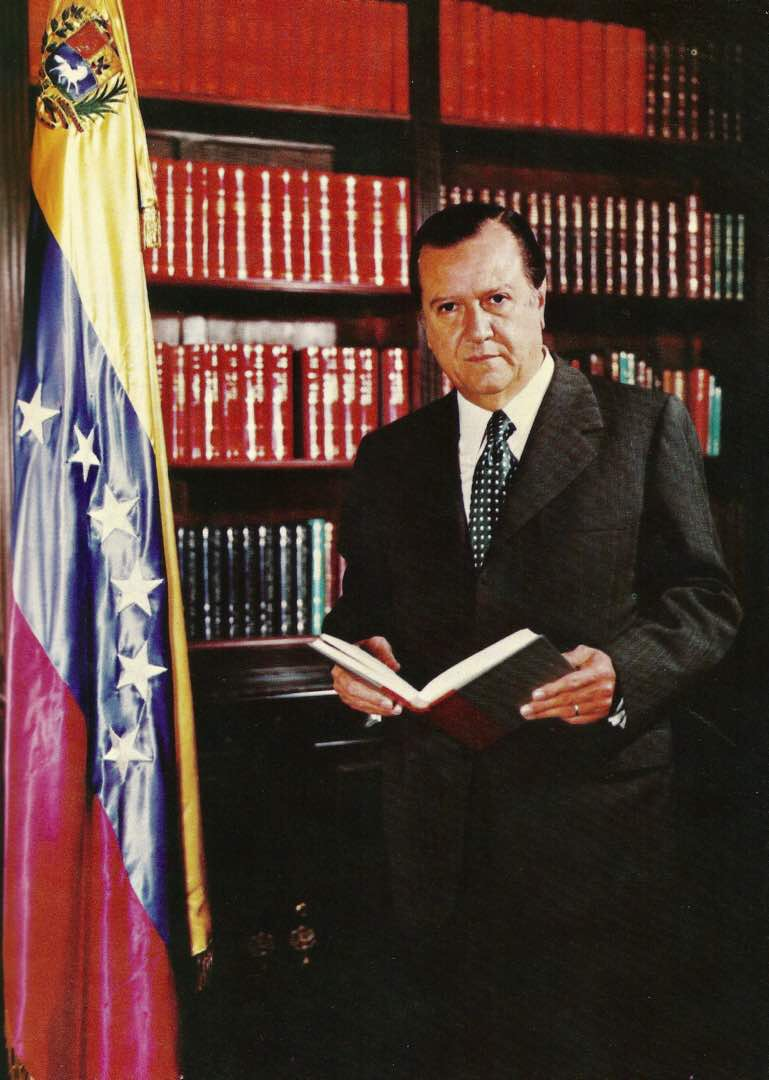
Rafael Caldera Ex-President of Venezuela and Founder of the UNET in 1974

The Universidad Nacional Experimental del Táchira was created by President Rafael Caldera on February 27, 1974. It was opened on June 23, 1975 with engineering and agronomy faculties only. Over the years, the university has become one of the most recognized and prestigious universities in Venezuela, reflected in the success of the majority of its graduates, who mostly are being hired by important companies over the country and even the world, because of the solid academic formation students acquired at the UNET and the work experience students complete in their internships. Also, various research activities have made the UNET a very important academic institution that contributes to the process of socioeconomic development in the region and the country. Currently, several research plans are being developed and focused on Engineering and Architecture careers which are the most important careers in the university.

== Symbols and Hymn ==
The UNET created its own symbols to demonstrate the autonomy that the university has against the other institutions around the country. It has three main symbols which are a flag, a hymn, and a motto. The flag is composed of blue and white colors and the University logo on the upper left. The hymn of the university is titled "Canto Universitario" which in English means "University song" and tells the story about important values the students must have to be part of the UNET and also mentions some regions of the Tachira state. Finally, the motto of the university that goes by "Somos del Tachira... su Universidad". Its translation to English means "We are from Tachira... your University" was created by the UNET students to make reference to who they are and where they are from.

== Campus ==
The UNET main campus is located in the Avenue Universidad Paramillo, in the city of San Cristobal, Tachira, Venezuela and holds three principal buildings denominated by A, B, and C. The university also has several headquarters that work as regular classrooms for students to take their classes or farms where UNET students perform projects of field research for the agronomy and engineering courses they take at the main campus or the other headquarters. The UNET headquarters for students to take their regular degree's classes and farms for the field research projects are located in different cities of the Tachira state such as:

- La Fria: A small town located in the Garcia de Heiva county in the state of Tachira, holds one of the farms the UNET uses to realize agronomic practices for UNET students and also to produce cocoa plantations for the students' research and local people's business around the region. The farm goes by the name of "La Morusca".
- Rubio: A small city located in the Junin county of the Tachira state, it is the biggest headquarter of the UNET after the main campus and goes by the name of "La Tuquerena". Agronomy and agro-industrial engineering are the only careers that are taught in this headquarter.
- Santo Domingo: A small town known for holding the Mayor Buenaventura Vivas Airport and the "Santa Rosa" farm, which is another UNET headquarter where Engineering and Agronomy students can perform their agronomic practices, for research purposes.
- Cordero: A small city located in the Andres Bello county that holds "La Primavera" farm, which is an UNET farm that is dedicated to the analysis of new agricultural technologies and recovery of micro watersheds where UNET students can participate as well as people from the region and other parts of the country that are interested on protecting the micro watersheds and investing on the new agricultural technologies.

== Employees ==
=== Deans ===
- Dean of teaching: The purpose of this department is to organize and gives all the information university staff will need to know for the beginning of each semester. Professors will be able to see their schedules and members of the department will be able to see the department's agenda for the meetings. Currently, Silverio Bonilla is the person in charge of the Dean's office in the UNET.
- Dean of postgraduate: The postgraduate dean's office is currently in charge of Miguel García, the purpose of this department is to offers all the academic options graduate students can obtain for studying at the UNET and also to keep the students informed about different activities and programs the university already offers or will offers in upcoming semesters.
- Dean of extension: José Andrés Molina is the person in charge of this department and its mission is to organize and coordinate new programs students and people from the region or the country can join and experience the programs the university works with. Most of the programs this Dean's office offer are about agronomy and languages such as English, French, and German.
- Dean of Student Development: Paula Villanueva is the person in charge of the Dean's Office for student development. The student development department has as a mission supports the students' integrity by giving the students the opportunity to train their bio, psycho, social, and spiritual aspects with special programs the university offers through this department such as sports or counseling.
- Dean of Research: The person in charge of this Dean's office is Luis Villanueva, the purpose of this department is to facilitate students the opportunity to improve the researches the university has already done or create new researches about the basic areas the university works with. The areas the UNET is used to do its researchers are industrial, farming, and sciences.

=== Rectors ===
The position of Rector is known as the person who is in charge of exercising the legal representation of the Institution and President of the University Council. These are the people who have held the UNET in chronological order, including the rector in charge now.

- Lorenzo Monrroy
- Jorge Rad
- Joaquín Rodríguez
- Martial Huggins
- Humberto Acosta
- Trino Gutiérrez
- José Sánchez Frank (2004-2013)
- Raúl Alberto Casanova Ostos (2014–Present)

== Academic offer ==
=== Undergraduate Careers ===
The university offers different careers to undergraduate students that have a high school diploma and that are assigned by the OPSU which is a service the Venezuelan government implemented to assigned bachelor's degree seekers into the public universities around the country. The UNET is known for having a large number of engineering careers that were added in different periods of time according to the number of students started to grow up. Some of the undergraduate careers the university offers are:

- Mechanical Engineering
- Civil Engineering – since 2008
- Industrial Engineering
- Electronic Engineering - since 1991
- Informatics Engineering – since 1997
- Environmental Engineering – since 2004
- Agronomy
- Architecture – since 1983
- Psychology
- Music – since 2006

=== Graduate Careers ===
Since 1986, the UNET offers several careers to graduate students in the main and headquarters campuses, most of the students who decide to study a master's degree in the UNET have obtained their bachelor's degree at the university. Students from other universities are also welcome to apply for an opportunity to study a Masters in the UNET, but the university gives priority to the students who have already studied in the institution. The most studied careers for graduate students are:

- Mechanical Engineering
- Electrical Engineering
- Administration of Health Institutions
- Marketing, Finance and Industries Management of Agricultural Companies
- Management of Tourist Companies
- Mathematics
- Teaching of the Basic Sciences mentions: Physics, Chemistry, Biology and Mathematics Educational management
