= Tulio Febres Cordero =

Venezuelan writer (1860–1938)

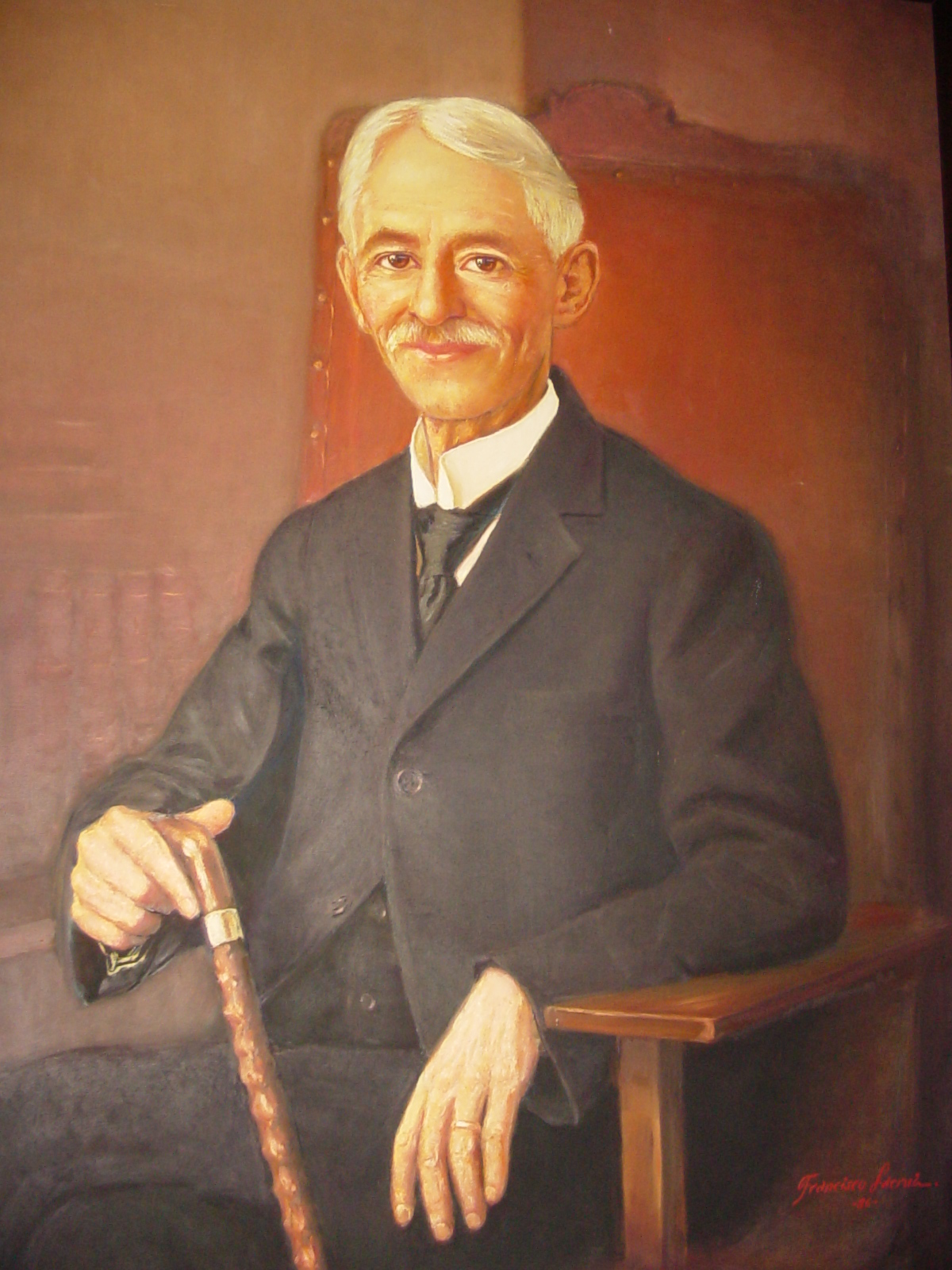
Tulio Febres-Cordero Troconis

Tulio Antonio Febres-Cordero Troconis (May 31, 1860 – June 3, 1938) was a Venezuelan writer, historian, university professor and journalist.

As a topographer, he developed the technique imagotipia (1885), or art to represent images with typefaces. He taught "Universal history" at the University of the Andes and made a fundamental contribution to the intellectual culture of Venezuela, by studying the history of Mérida.
