= Rafael Caldera =

President of Venezuela (1969–1974; 1994–1999)

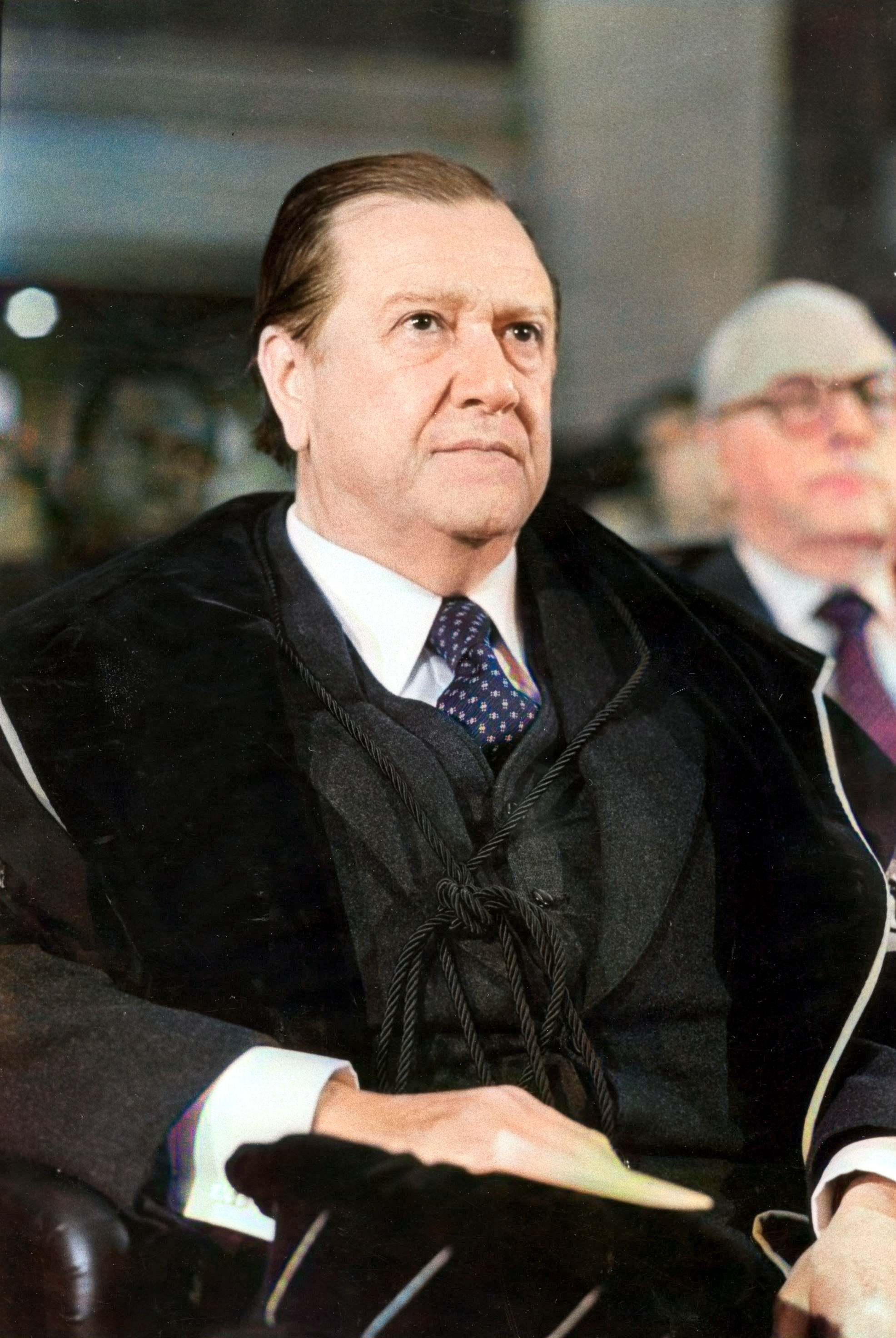
- Caldera in 1979

46th & 51st President of Venezuela
- In office 2 February 1994 – 2 February 1999
- Preceded by: Ramón José Velásquez (acting)
- Succeeded by: Hugo Chávez
- In office 11 March 1969 – 11 March 1974
- Preceded by: Raúl Leoni
- Succeeded by: Carlos Andrés Pérez

Senator for Life
- In office 2 February 1999 – 20 March 2000
- In office 11 March 1974 – 2 February 1994

President of the Chamber of Deputies of the Congress of Venezuela
- In office 1959–1962
- Succeeded by: Manuel Vicente Ledezma

Solicitor General of Venezuela
- In office 26 October 1945 – 13 April 1946

Personal details
- Born: Rafael Antonio Caldera Rodríguez; 24 January 1916 San Felipe, Venezuela
- Died: 24 December 2009 (aged 93) Caracas, Venezuela
- Resting place: East Cemetery
- Party: COPEI (1946–1993); National Convergence (1993–2009)
- Spouse: Alicia Pietri Montemayor
- Children: Mireya Caldera; Rafael Tomás Caldera; Juan José Caldera; Alicia Elena Caldera; Cecilia Caldera; Andrés Caldera
- Education: Central University of Venezuela (1926-2009), (1928-2009)
- Occupation: Lawyer
- Website: Official website

Rafael Antonio Caldera Rodríguez (Spanish pronunciation: [rafaˈel anˈtonjo kalˈdeɾa roˈðɾiɣes]; 24 January 1916 – 24 December 2009) was a Venezuelan politician, academic, and author who served as the 46th and 51st president of Venezuela from 1969 to 1974 and from 1994 to 1999. He co-founded the Christian Democratic party COPEI and helped draft the 1961 Constitution. He was one of the leading figures in Venezuelan democratic politics during the second half of the 20th century and a pioneer of the Christian Democratic movement in Latin America.

During his first presidency, Caldera pursued a policy of national pacification that ended the country's long-running left-wing insurgency. His administration oversaw Venezuela's first peaceful democratic transfer of power from the governing party to the opposition, restored diplomatic relations with Eastern Bloc-aligned countries, and enacted measures that paved the way for the nationalization of the oil industry.

After serving in the Senate and holding leadership positions in several international organizations, Caldera was elected to a second presidential term in 1993. His administration faced a severe banking crisis, recession, and falling oil prices, and implemented economic reforms while promoting anti-corruption initiatives and labour and social security reforms. It also included the pardon of participants in the 1992 coup attempts, including Hugo Chávez, who was elected president in 1998.

In addition to his political career, Caldera taught law for over two decades, published numerous books and essays on law, politics, history, and Christian Democracy, and was a member of the Venezuelan National Academy of Language and the Venezuelan National Academy of Political and Social Sciences.

== Youth, education and early achievements ==
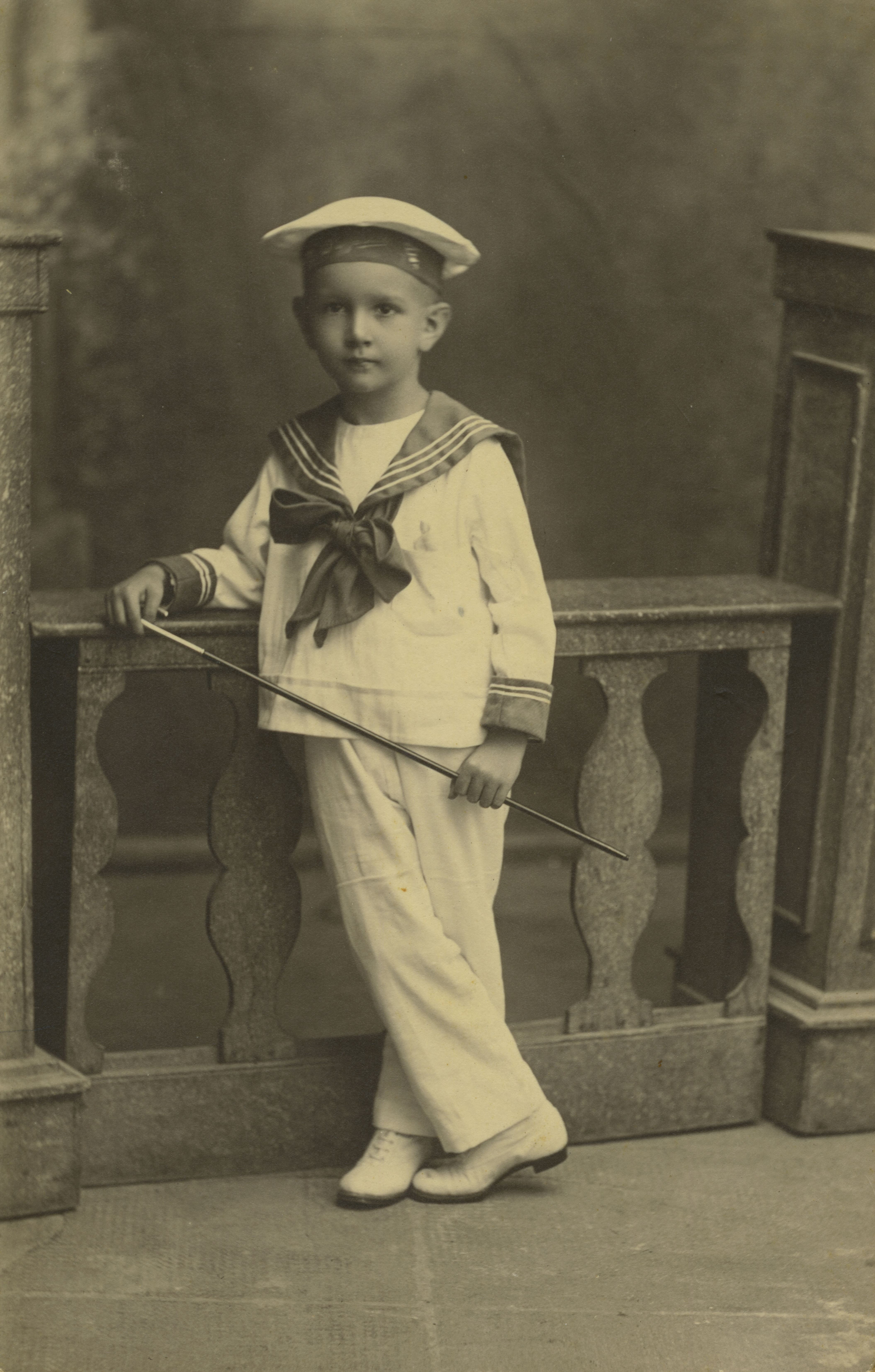
The child Rafael Caldera, dressed as a sailor, 1920.

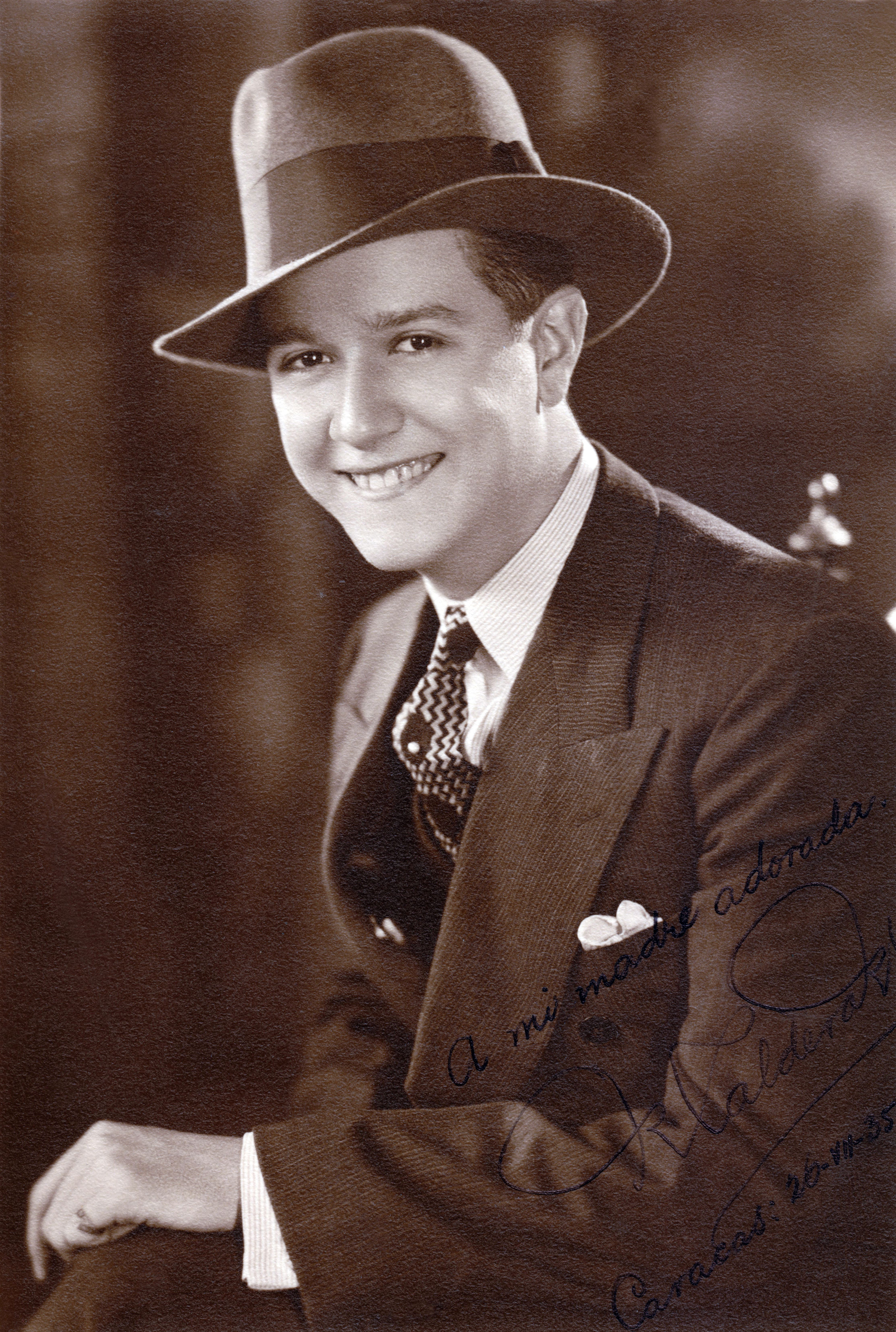
Caldera at nineteen years, 1935.

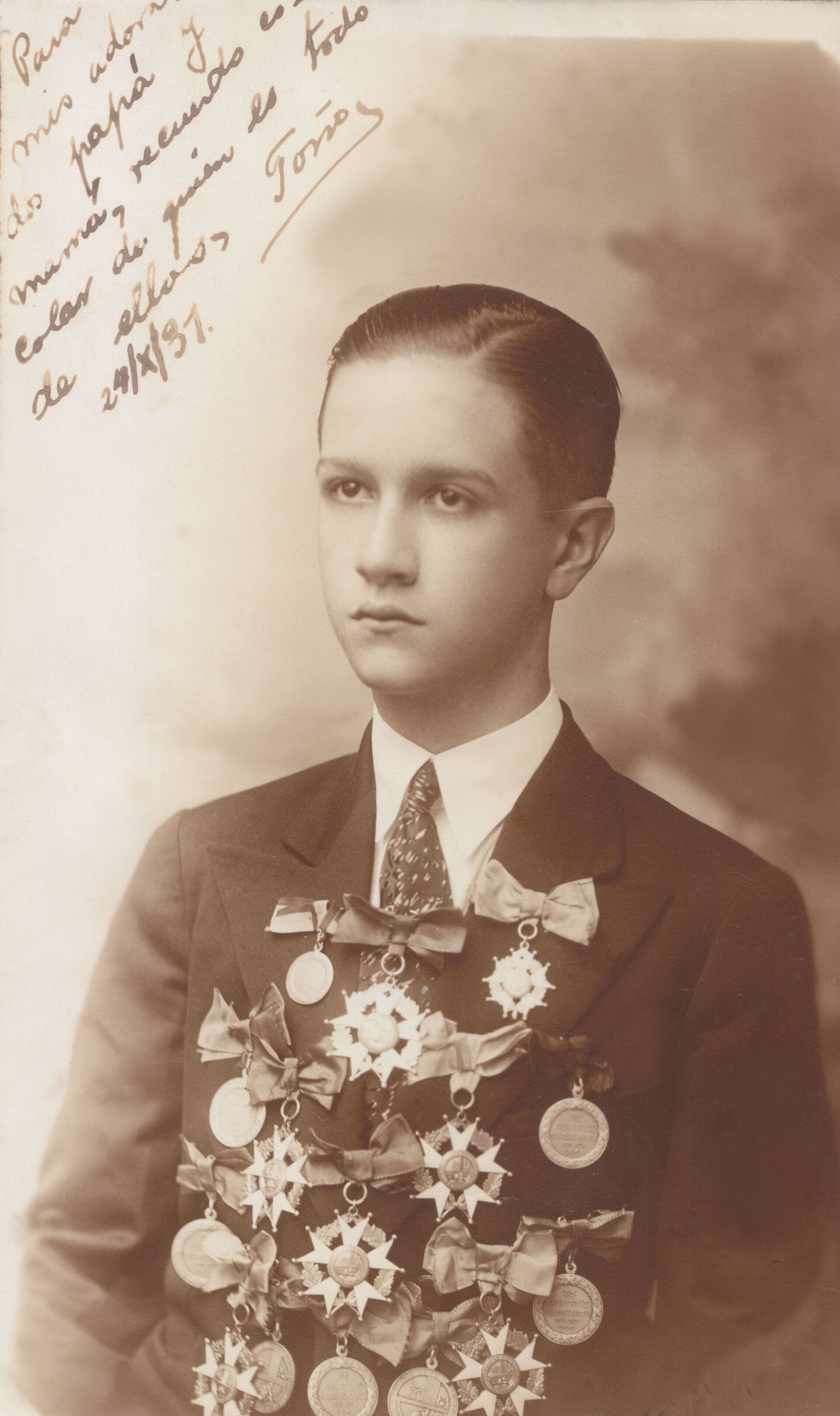
Rafael Caldera during the High School graduation awards, Colegio San Ignacio, Caracas, 16 October 1931. (Handwritten text): "For my adored mom and dad, a keepsake of my school with total devotion".

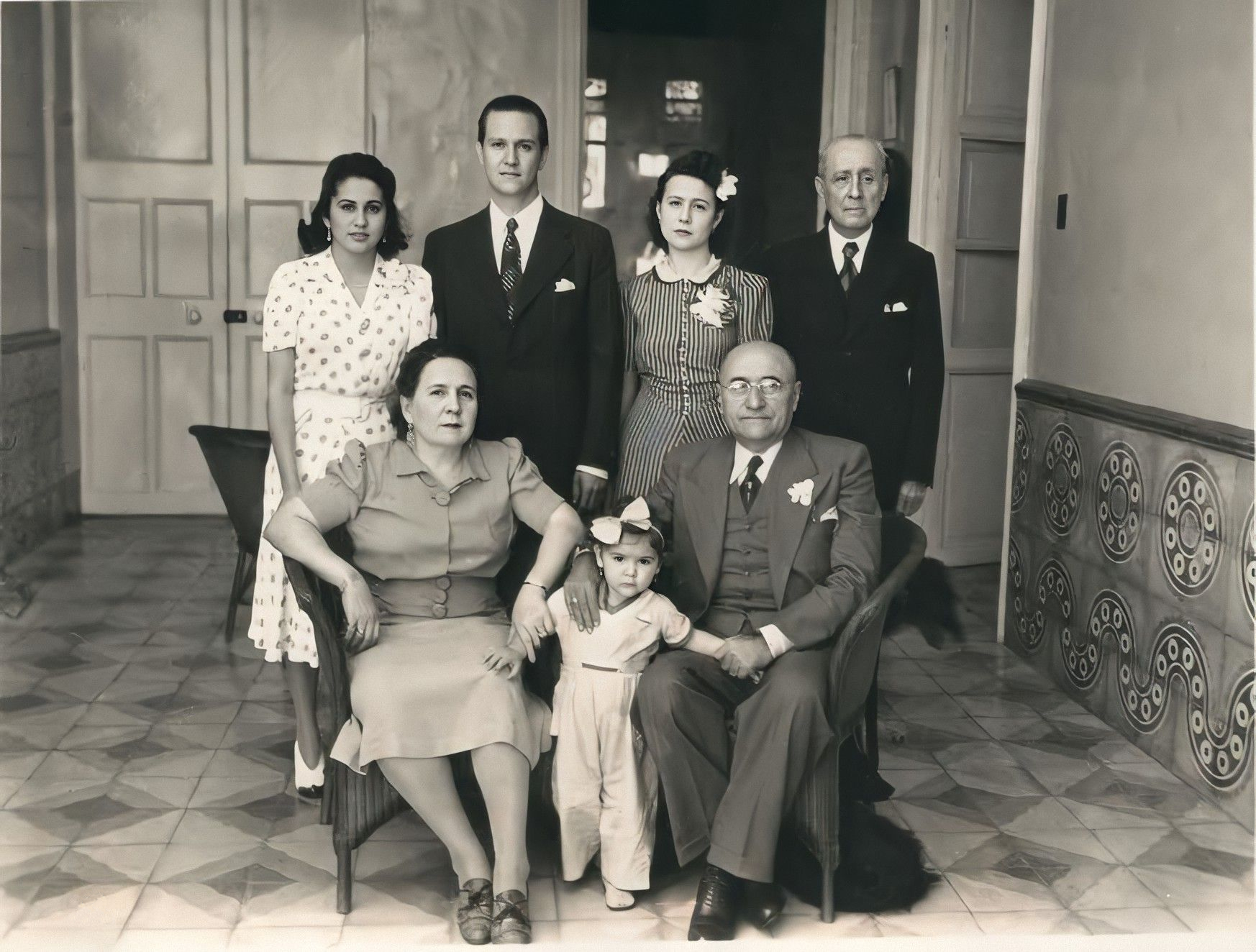
Caldera during his engagement to Alicia. Also in the photo: his father, Rafael Caldera Izaguirre, his sister Rosa Elena, and his aunt and uncle (who became his adoptive parents) Maria Eva Rodríguez and Tomás Liscano, at Miracielos, Caracas, 1940.

Rafael Caldera Rodríguez, the son of Rafael Caldera Izaguirre and Rosa Sofía Rodríguez Rivero, was born on 24 January 1916, in San Felipe, Venezuela. His mother having died when he was two and a half years-old, Caldera was raised by his maternal aunt María Eva Rodríguez Rivero and her husband Tomás Liscano Giménez.

Caldera attended elementary school in his native San Felipe and later in Caracas, at the Jesuit-run Catholic school San Ignacio de Loyola, where he completed his secondary education at the age of fifteen. The following year he began law studies at the Central University of Venezuela.

As a young university student, Caldera exhibited a precocious intellectual brilliance. At the age of nineteen, and after studying the 26 volumes of Andrés Bello's collected works, Caldera published his first book, Andres Bello, a comprehensive analysis of the life and works of Bello's literary, linguistic, legal, historic, philosophical, and political texts. This book received an award from the Venezuelan National Academy of Language in 1935, and has remained an indispensable reference for scholarship studies on the most prominent Venezuelan man-of-letters of the 19th century.

Caldera was a student of Manuel Aguirre and was introduced to Luigi Sturzo by Aguirre.

A year later, Venezuelan President López Contreras took notice of newspaper op-ed pieces about labor issues written by the young twenty-year-old Caldera. Contreras appointed him deputy director of the newly created National Labor Office. From this position, Caldera played a major role in the drafting of Venezuela's first Labor Law, which remained current for more than fifty years until its reform in 1990. The international lawyer Wilfred Jenks, who drafted the Declaration of Philadelphia on labor rights and served two terms as Director-General of the International Labour Organization (ILO), an affiliated agency of the League of Nations, visited Venezuela in 1936 to review the law. He worked closely with Caldera, then Venezuela's first ILO correspondent. Jenks later stated that the International Labor Code published under his guidance on the eve of the Second World War, contained several topics that were arranged in a manner that had originally been employed in the Venezuelan draft Labor Code.

During his university years, Caldera became actively engaged in student politics. He joined the Venezuelan Federation of Students (FEV), which was led by students who had revolted in 1928 against the dictator Juan Vicente Gómez and were known as the Generation of 28. Although significantly younger than his peers, Caldera courageously split from this student federation after its leadership called for anticlerical reforms demanding the expulsion of the Jesuits and other religious orders from Venezuela.

In 1936, Caldera founded the National Student Union (UNE), the seed of what eventually became the Venezuelan Christian Democratic movement.

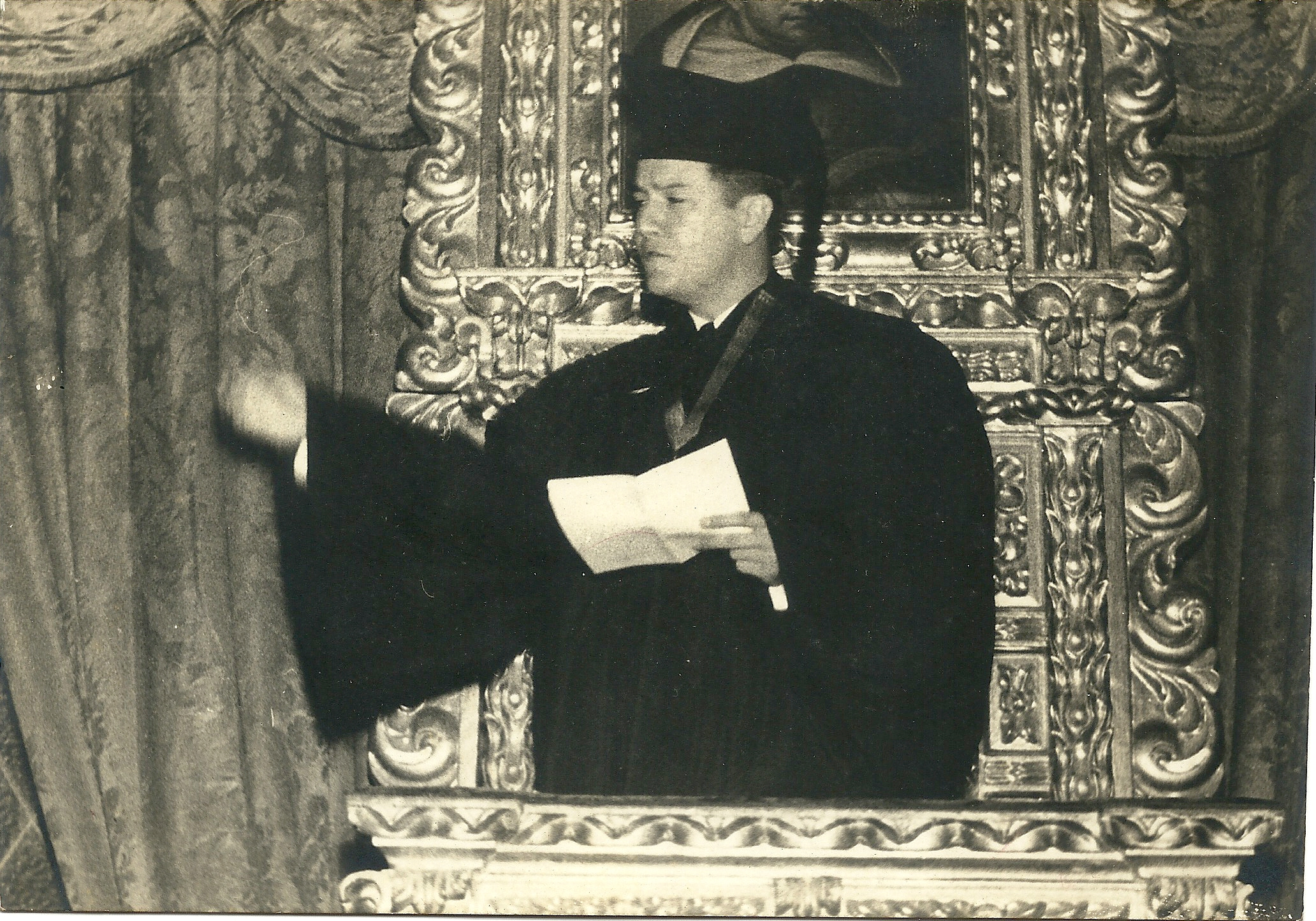
In the auditorium of the Central University of Venezuela, upon graduating as a lawyer and doctor of Political Science in 1939.

== Political life ==
=== The first thirty years (1939–1969) ===
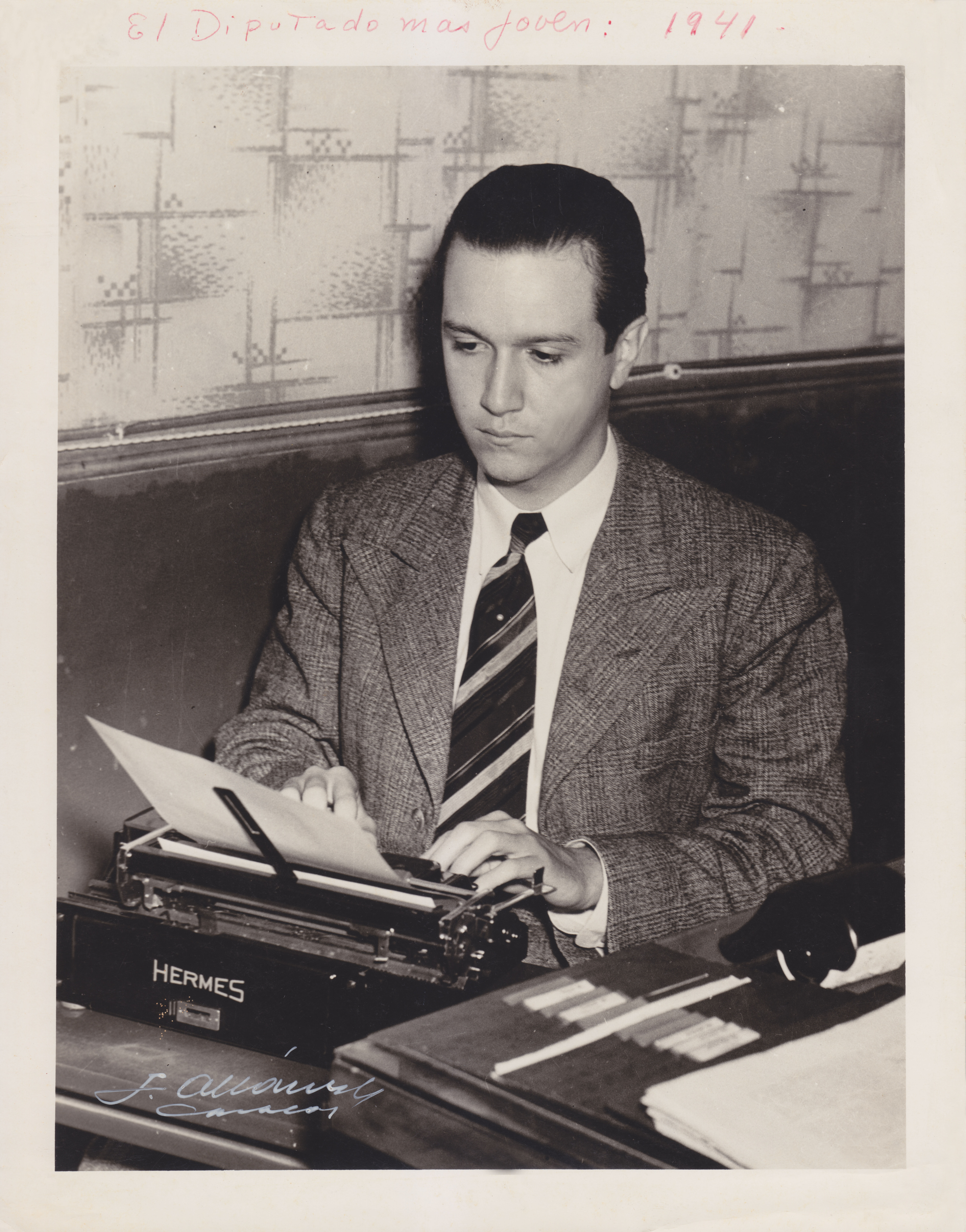
1941. The youngest representative to be appointed to the National Congress, Rafael Caldera was twenty-five years old.

After graduating from university, Caldera founded National Action, a political movement formed to participate in municipal elections. Soon after, he founded the National Action Party and was elected in January 1941, at the age of twenty-five, to the Chamber of Deputies for his native state of Yaracuy.

As a congressman, he strongly opposed the bill that led to the 1941 boundary treaty with Colombia. He also had a prominent role in the debates on the partial reform of the 1936 Constitution and revisions to the Civil Code, and was a leading voice in the enactment of progressive labor laws. On 27 October 1945, Caldera was appointed Solicitor General by Rómulo Betancourt, head of the Revolutionary Government Junta that ousted President Isaías Medina Angarita on 18 October 1945.

On 13 January 1946, Caldera co-founded COPEI, Comité de Organización Política Electoral Independiente (Independent Political Electoral Organization Committee), the Christian Democratic Party that grew to become one of the two largest mass political parties in Venezuela. COPEI's first statement of principles was inspired by the social teaching of the papal encyclical Quadragesimo Anno (1931) and embraced democracy, pluralism and social reform.

Four months later, on 13 April 1946, Caldera resigned from his position as Solicitor General in protest against the continuous violent attacks that members of his newly created party were suffering from government supporters.

In 1946, he was elected as a representative to the National Constituent Assembly, inaugurated on 17 December of that year. This legislative body had the task of drafting a new Constitution guided by the principles of the October Revolution. Venezuelans from every corner of the country came to admire the rhetorical skills of the young politician. Venezuelans were able to listen to Caldera's speeches after Andrés Eloy Blanco, President of the National Constituent Assembly, granted Caldera's request to allow live radio broadcast of the legislative sessions. Caldera played a prominent role in this assembly. He delivered celebrated speeches on the social rights of workers, the social function of private property, agrarian reform, religious freedom, religious education, and the need for direct, popular election of state governors.

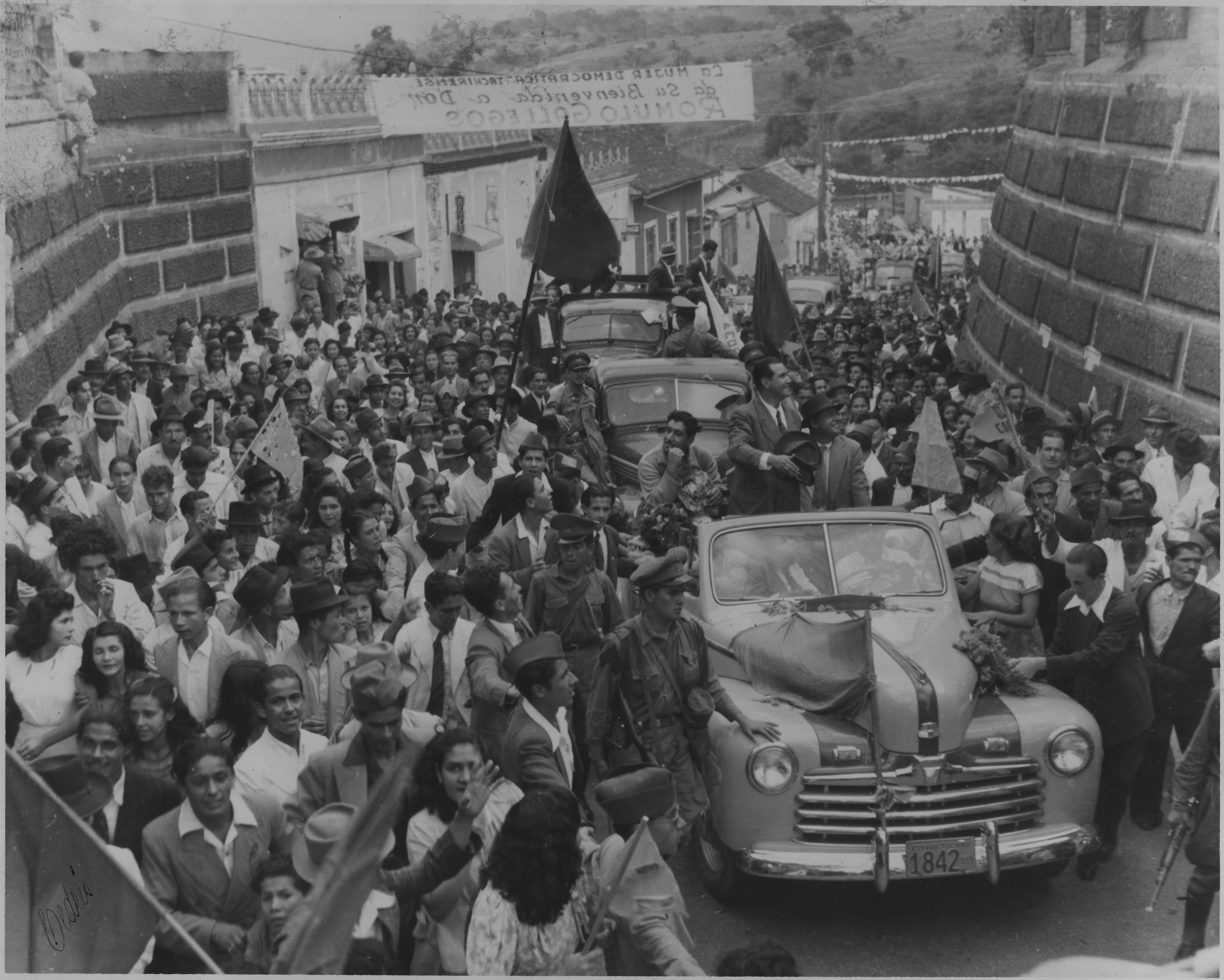
Rafael Caldera during the 1947 Presidential campaign. Arriving at San Cristóbal, Táchira.

In the 1947 elections, at the age of 31, he ran for president for the first time and travelled around the country to spread the ideas of his newly created party. The renowned Venezuelan novelist Rómulo Gallegos, candidate of the social democrat party AD (Democratic Action), won this election. Caldera also ran for Congress and was elected to the Chamber of Deputies for the period 1948–1953. His congressional term, however, was interrupted after Gallegos was ousted by a coup d'état on 24 November 1948.

In 1952, Caldera was elected representative to the National Constituent Assembly. After Colonel Marcos Pérez Jiménez, head of the Military Junta, ignored the electoral triumph of the URD party (Democratic Republican Union), and expelled Jóvito Villalba and other leaders of this party from the country, Caldera and other elected party members of COPEI refused to participate in the new Constituent Assembly.

During the Pérez Jiménez military dictatorship (1952–1958), Caldera was expelled from Universidad Central de Venezuela and arrested several times. On 3 August 1955, agents of the National Security, a large secret police force led by Pedro Estrada that hunted down opponents and ran notorious concentration camps, threw a bomb into Caldera's home, endangering the life of his youngest child, then nine months-old. On 20 August 1957, he was once again imprisoned, but this time in solitary confinement, after Pérez Jiménez learned that Caldera, in all likelihood, would be the consensus candidate for all opposition parties in the presidential election scheduled for December, 1957. With Caldera imprisoned, Pérez Jiménez turned the election into an unconstitutional plebiscite ("Yes" or "No" referendum) to decide his permanence in power.

Following the December 1957 plebiscite, Caldera was exiled by the Pérez Jiménez dictatorship in January 1958. He travelled to New York City and was greeted by Rómulo Betancourt and Jóvito Villalba. His exile, however, only lasted a few days since Marcos Pérez Jiménez was deposed by a civil revolt and military coup on 23 January 1958. Upon returning to Venezuela, the three leaders signed the Puntofijo Pact, named after Caldera's residence where it was signed.

This pact contained important political agreements, especially, the commitment of all major political parties to build, protect and strengthen democratic institutions and the rule of law. According to political science scholar Daniel H. Levine, its aim was to "support democracy, band together to resist challenges to its legitimacy and survival; respect elections; and strive in general to institutionalize politics, channeling participation within democratic vehicles and arenas."

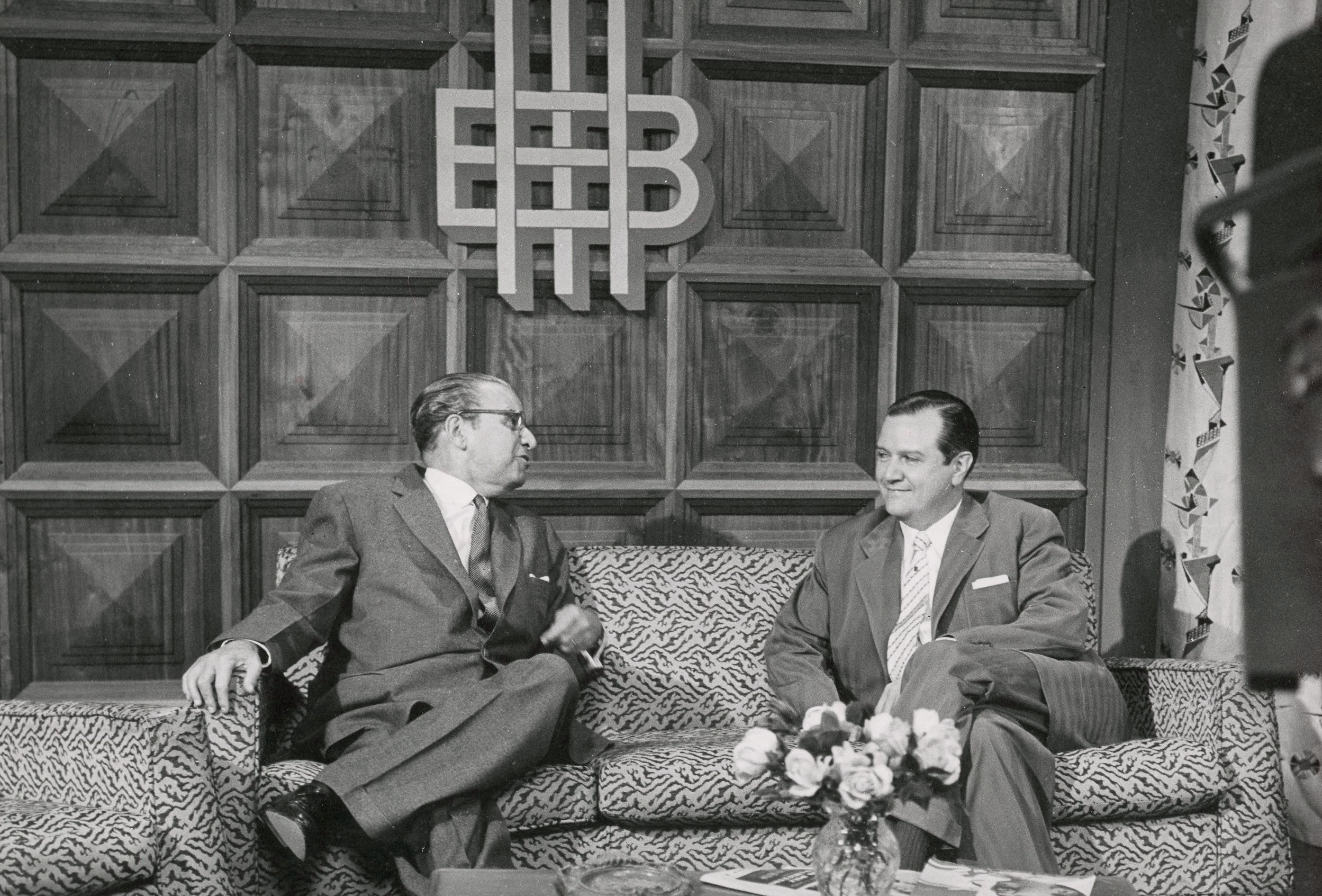
Caldera and Mariano Picón Salas during the talk show La Hora Nacional. RCTV, 1958.

The Puntofijo Pact served as the foundation for the longest period of civil democratic rule in Venezuela (1958–1999).

Unable to reach agreement over a consensus candidate, the three major parties that signed the Puntofijo Pact (AD, URD, and COPEI) competed in the 1958 presidential election with their own candidates and platforms. Rafael Caldera lost to Rómulo Betancourt (AD) and Wolfgang Larrazábal (URD), who came in first and second place respectively. Caldera also ran for Congress and was elected President of the Chamber of Deputies. In this capacity, he co-presided the Bicameral Commission in charge of drafting the new Constitution.

The 1961 Constitution was Venezuela's most successful and long-lived Constitution. This country adopted twenty-five different constitutions between 1811 and 1961, and only three of them (1830, 1854, 1881) lasted more than ten years. After its long history under dictatorships and arbitrary rule, Venezuela became, in the words of Professor Levine, "the most stable mass democracy in South America". For four decades, he explains, "Venezuelans built a political system marked by high participation, strong leadership, institutional continuity, and genuine pervasive competition. Power was transferred peacefully in six consecutive national elections."

Caldera came in second place in the 1963 presidential election that Raúl Leoni won as candidate of the ruling party (AD). Soon thereafter, he was elected President of the Christian Democratic Organization of America (ODCA) for the period 1964–1968, and as first President of the Christian Democratic World Union for the period 1967–1968.

In December 1968 Caldera ran for president for the third time. This time, Caldera benefited from a split in AD. Senate president Luis Beltrán Prieto Figueroa won the party primary. However, the party's old guard felt Prieto was too left-wing, and intervened to deliver the nomination to Gonzalo Barrios. Prieto and a number of his supporters broke off to form the People's Electoral Movement. Ultimately, Caldera defeated Barrios with 29.1 percent of the vote, a margin of just 32,000 votes. Prieto finished fourth, but his 719,000 votes far exceeded Caldera's margin.

Caldera was sworn in on 11 March 1969. For the first time in Venezuela's 139-year history as an independent nation, there was a peaceful and democratic transfer of power from the ruling party to the opposition. It was also the first time in the country's history that a party won power without ever having resorted to violence. However, COPEI still had a minority in the legislature.

=== First term in office (1969–1974) ===
Venezuelan Presidential election 1968
Candidates	Votes	%
Rafael Caldera	1,083,712	29.13%
Gonzalo Barrios	1,050,806	28.24%
Miguel Angel Burelli	826,758	22.22%
Luis Beltran Pietro Figueroa	719,461	19.34%
Abstention:	135.311	3.27%
Total votes:	3,999,617	

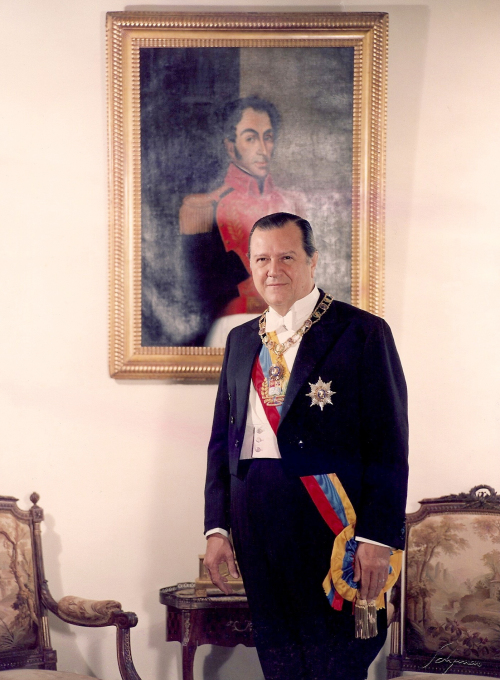
Rafael Caldera in his first term, 1969

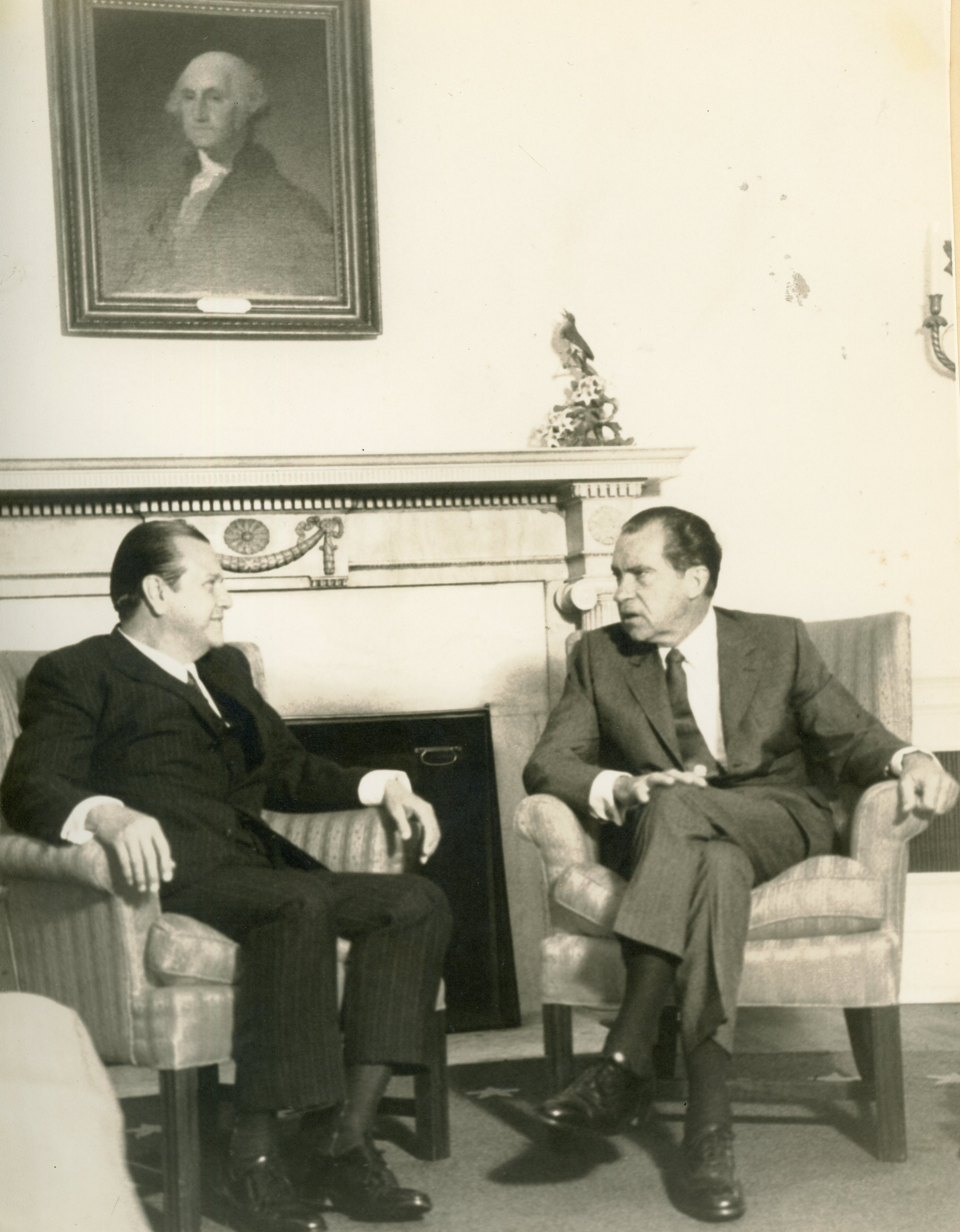
Meeting with President Nixon at the White House, during his official visit to the United States. 2 June 1970.

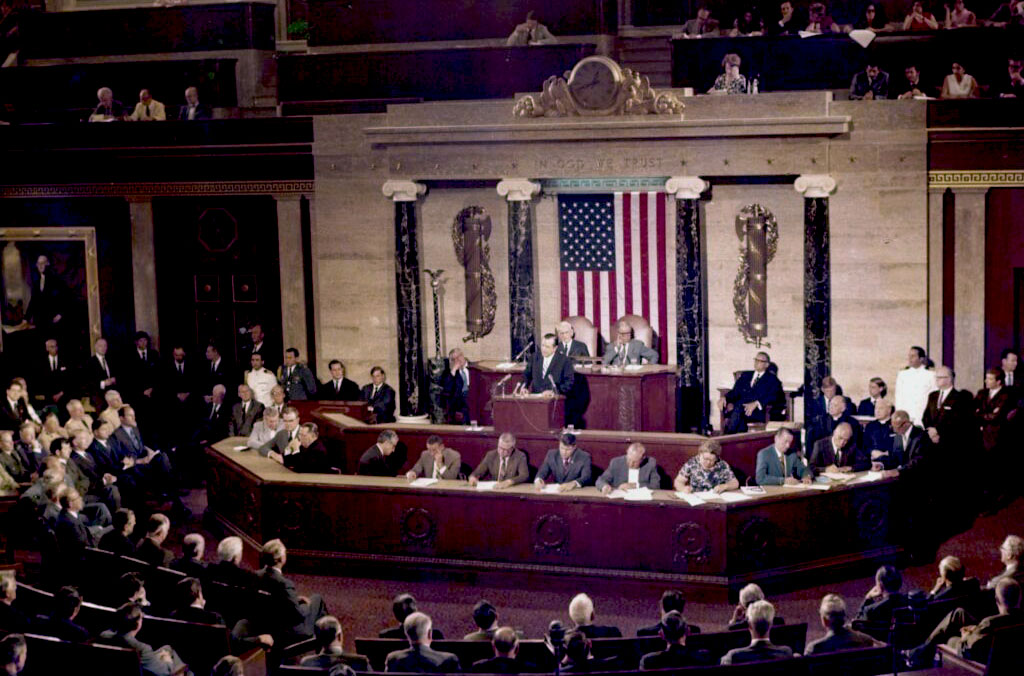
Caldera during an address to a joint session of the U.S. Congress, 3 June 1970.

The process of pacification, a policy that allowed the armed left to lay down their arms and participate in politics under democratic rules, was one of the most important achievements of Caldera's first presidency. This pardon effectively put an end to the guerrilla warfare which had plagued the country for ten years, costing many lives.

A key distinction between Caldera's first government and those of his predecessors lay in the area of foreign policy. President Caldera restored bilateral relations with the Soviet Union and the 'Eastern Bloc' states in general, as well as with a number of South American nations that had fallen under military dictatorships, including Argentina, Panama, and Peru. This policy, known as "pluralistic solidarity", was a reversion of his predecessor's Betancourt Doctrine.

Even though Caldera was forced to track back to Washington following the oil shocks of 1970, Venezuela was still poised to be an important economic player going into the early 70s. Caldera always considered the United States more of an ally than an adversary, yet he still brought Venezuela's new economic strength to bear on their relationship. Caldera took advantage of momentous developments in the international oil trade. He raised taxes on oil production, nationalized the gas industry, and enacted stringent laws regulating the U.S. oil companies that operated in Venezuela. In 1971, Caldera raised the oil profit tax to 70 per cent. In addition, he passed the hydrocarbons reversion law which provided that all oil company assets would go to the State once the concessions had elapsed.

This law paved the way for the nationalization of the oil industry, which was overseen by finance minister Luis Enrique Oberto. In his official visit to the U.S. in 1970, Caldera obtained a commitment from the Nixon administration to increase the market share of Venezuelan petroleum exports to the United States. Speaking before a joint session of the U.S. Congress, Caldera won repeated applause from the Senators and Representatives as he bluntly urged Americans to change their approach toward Latin America: "The formula for achieving cordial relations," he said, "cannot be the merciless attempts at forever lowering the prices of our goods while increasing the price of commodities we have to import."

Caldera's most important domestic priorities during his first administration were education, housing, and infrastructure. He dramatically increased the number of educational institutions by doubling the number of public secondary schools and tripling the number of state university colleges and institutes of technology. Universities built and inaugurated during his administration include Simón Bolívar University, Simón Rodríguez, Táchira, and the Institute of Higher Studies for National Defense. On 3 October 1970, after weeks of violent student protests, and reports of weapons and explosive materials hidden inside the university campus, Caldera intervened Central University of Venezuela in order to protect and safeguard the life of students, professors and university employees. Once peace was restored on campus, the university regained its autonomy and held elections for a new governing board.

During Caldera's first presidency, a total of 291,233 housing units were built. In terms of infrastructure and public buildings, some of the most important works completed during his first administration include: Poliedro de Caracas, the buildings for the Ministry of Education, the Courts of Law, and the Central Bank; the Museo de Arte Contemporáneo, and the Ríos Reyna Theatre of the Teresa Carreño Cultural Complex, in Caracas; the general hospitals of Maracay, Coro, Mérida, San Carlos, Valle de la Pascua, Chiquinquirá in Maracaibo and Miguel Pérez Carreño and Los Magallanes de Catia in Caracas; major highways such as Cota Mil and La Araña-Caricuao in Caracas, Barquisimeto-Yaritagua, Valencia-Campo de Carabobo and Barcelona-Crucero de Maturín; airports La Chinita in Maracaibo, Santiago Mariño in Porlamar and Las Piedras in Paraguaná; the José Antonio Páez water dam in Mérida, Cumaripa in Yaracuy, and the third and four phases of the Guri Project in Guayana.

=== International leadership and years as Senator (1974–1993) ===
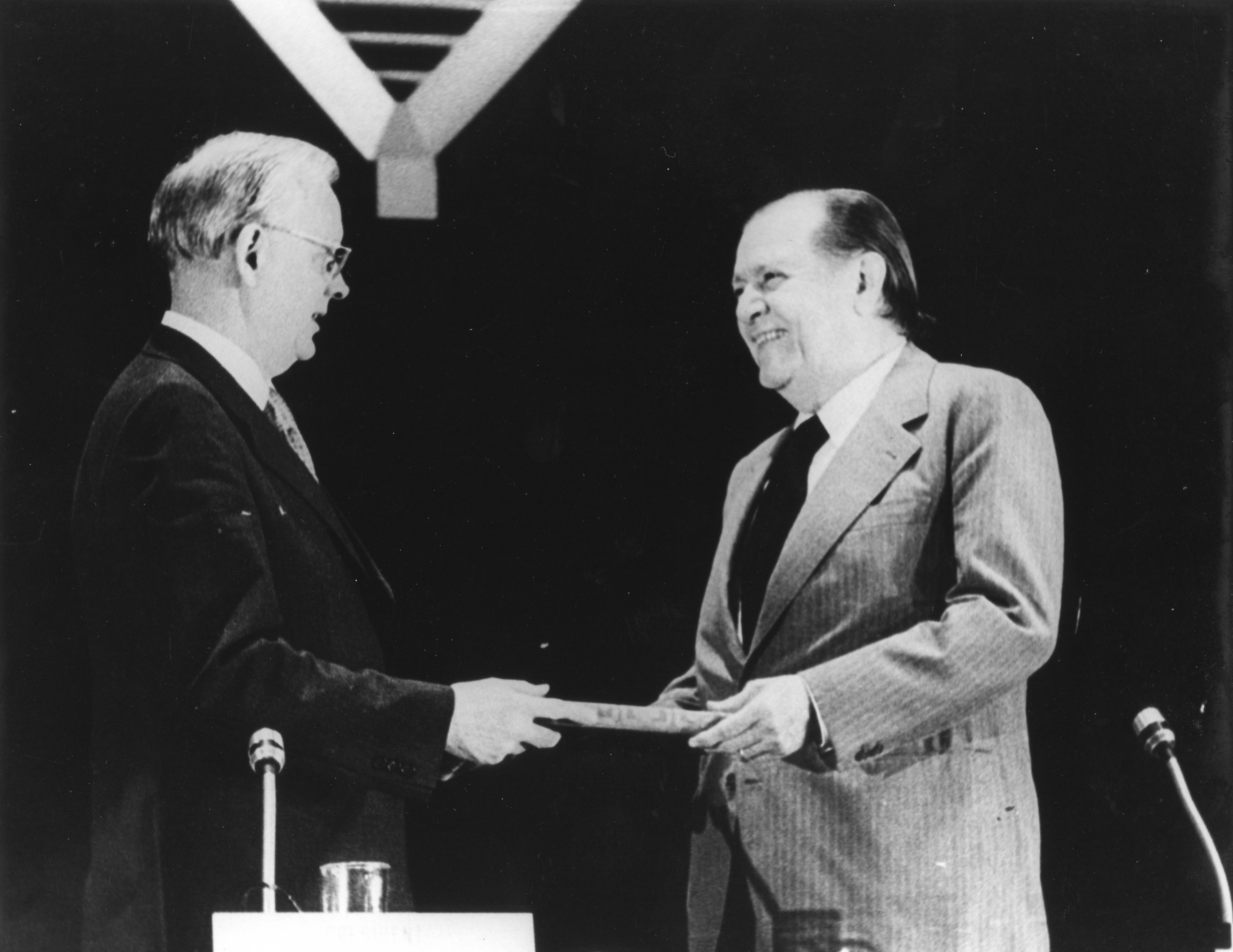
Sir Thomas Williams bestows the Presidency of the Inter-Parliamentary Union Governing Council to Rafael Caldera. 21 September 1979.

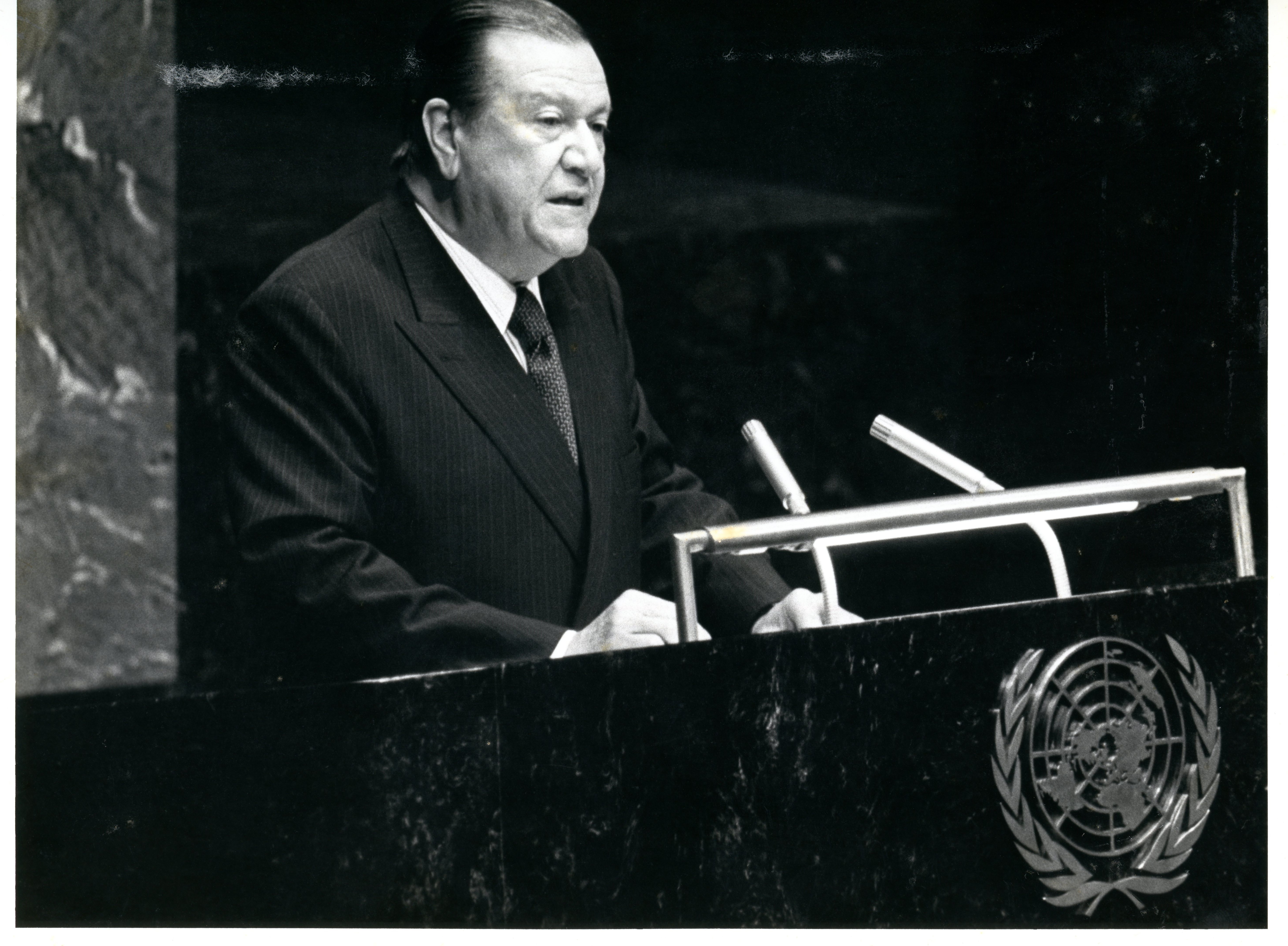
Speech as president of the Inter-Parliamentary Union before the United Nations General Assembly. 27 August 1980.

After leaving the presidency of Venezuela, Caldera continued both scholarly and political pursuits. He served in the Venezuelan Senate as all former presidents were granted lifelong appointments to the Senate under 1961 Constitution.

During this period Caldera was appointed to several important leadership positions in international organizations. Hailed for his role in maintaining democracy and stability in an era when most other Latin American countries experienced political upheaval, Caldera served as President of the Inter-Parliamentary Union from 1979 to 1982. In 1979, he was elected President of the World Congress of Agrarian Reform and Rural Development, which met in Rome under the auspices of the Food and Agriculture Organization (FAO) of the United Nations.

A year later, Caldera presided over the International Committee in charge of preparing an international agreement for the establishment of the University for Peace, approved by the General Assembly of the United Nations on 5 December 1980.

In March 1987, Caldera was invited by Pope John Paul II to deliver a speech before the College of Cardinals to commemorate the 20th anniversary of the Papal Encyclical Populorum Progressio.

A leading theme in his speeches and conferences during these years was the need to find solutions to the debt crisis that gravely affected most third-world countries. His main concern was to denounce the injustice of placing the heavy burden of servicing the debt on the shoulders of the most impoverished and vulnerable people of third-world countries.

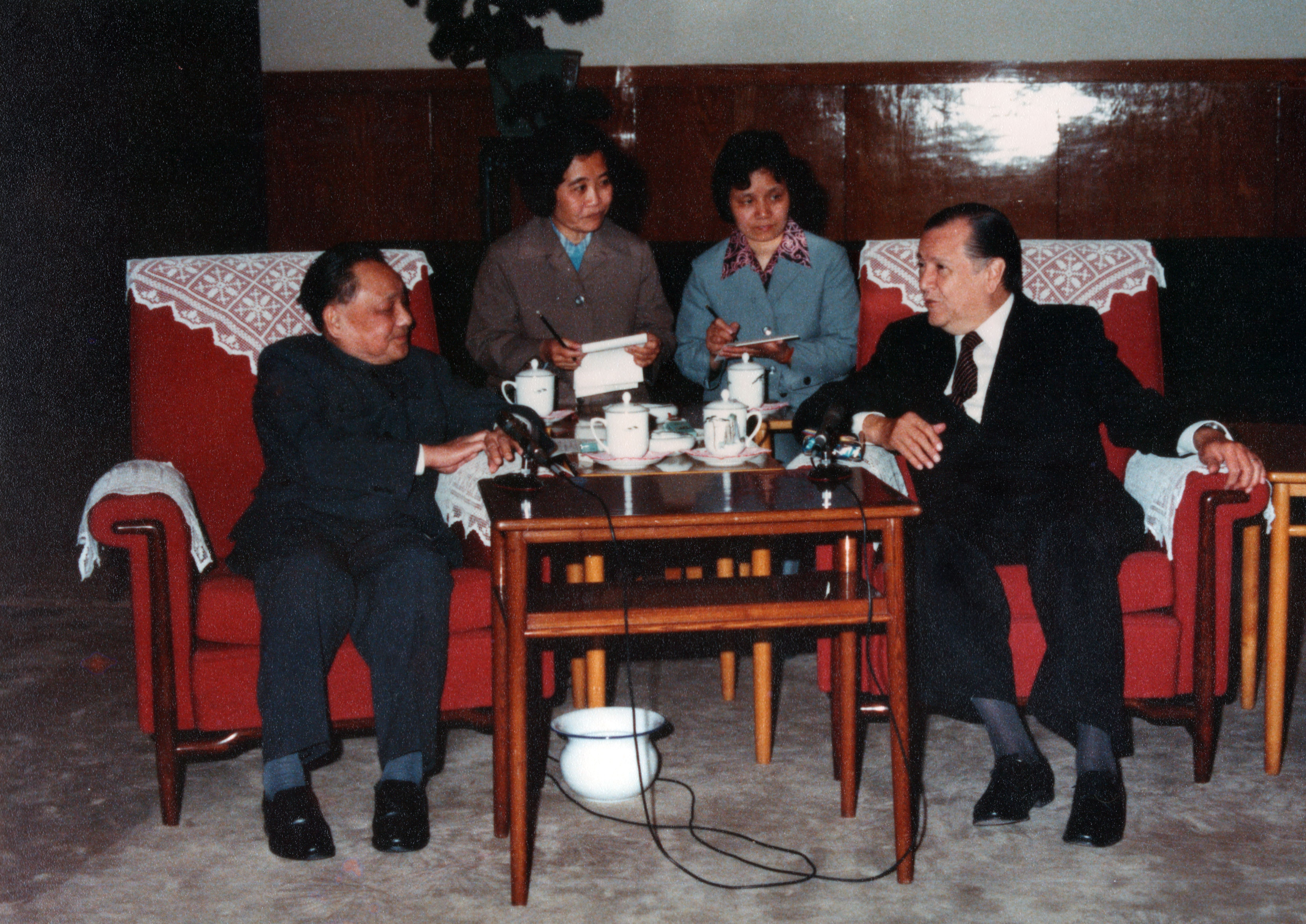
Meeting with Paramount leader of China, Deng Xiaoping, Beijing, China, 6 April 1981.

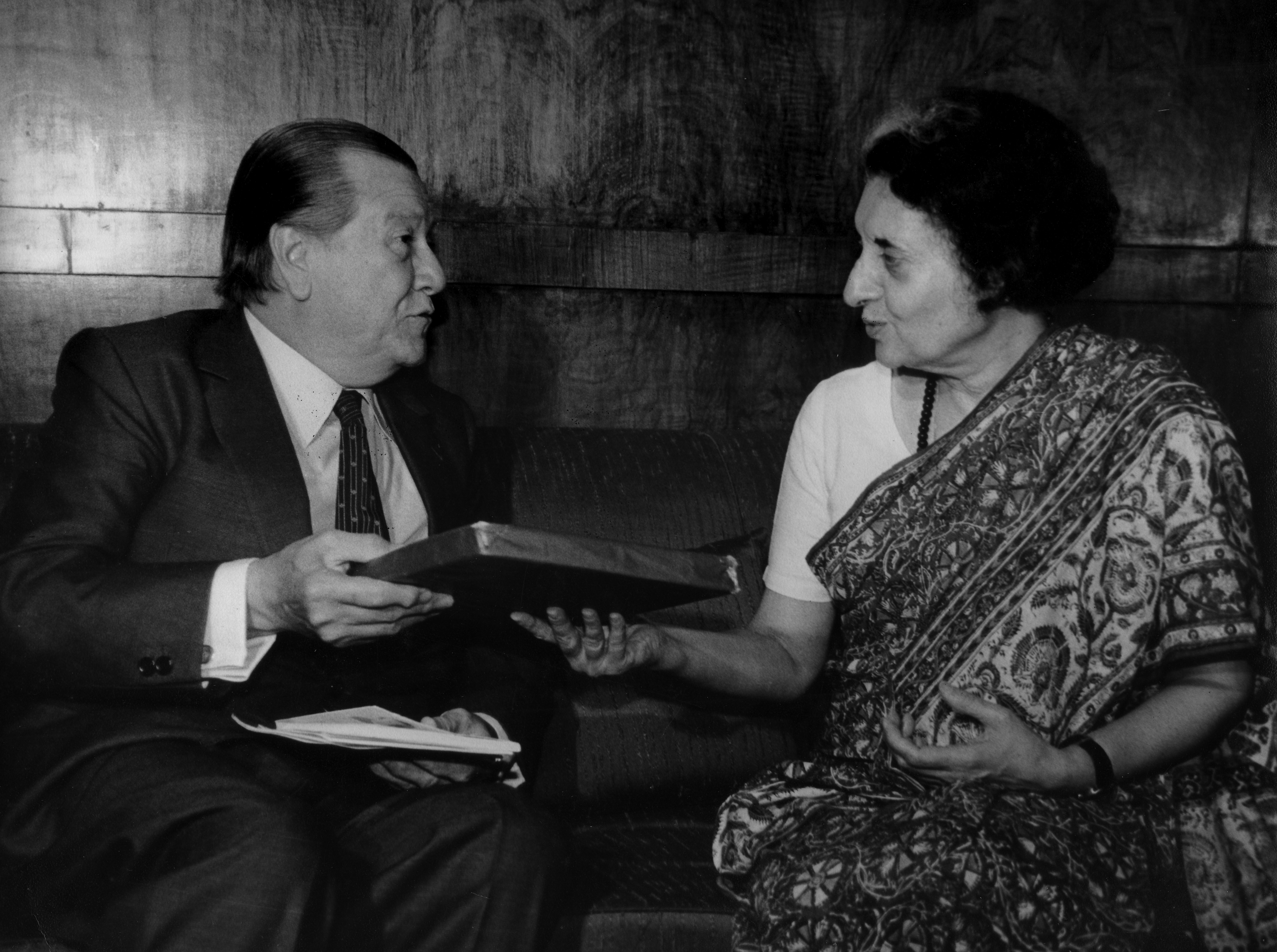
Visit with the Prime Minister of India, Indira Gandhi, as President of the Inter-Parliamentary Union, 26 April 1982.

As tenured Senator in the Venezuelan National Congress, Caldera chose to use the speaker podium exclusively on matters of national importance. As the "architect" of the 1961 Constitution, he was called upon by leaders of all Venezuelan parties to defend its principles, validity and timeliness. Accordingly, he was chosen to deliver the commemorative speeches before special joint sessions of Congress on the 15th (1976) and 25th (1986) anniversaries of the 1961 Constitution. In 1985, he was appointed President of the Bicameral Congress Commission for the Reform of the Labor Law. After years of deliberations with workers, legal experts, labor unions, and representatives from industry and commerce chambers, the bill was presented in 1989 and passed by Congress at the end of 1990.

In June 1989, Caldera was appointed President of the Bicameral Congress Commission for the Reform of the Constitution. The reform project prepared by the commission was presented in March 1992, but did not receive the necessary support from the major political parties in Congress. This project included provisions to restructure the Judiciary as well as mechanisms to strengthen citizen participation in democracy. These changes had been demanded by most sectors of Venezuela's society, in light of corruption in the administration of justice and insufficient means for citizens to directly participate in governmental decisions. The political events that later unfolded in 1999, and particularly President Chávez' call for a constituent assembly during the first year of his administration, reflect how consequential Congress' dismissal of this reform bill would eventually become.

The most memorable and controversial speeches Caldera delivered as Senator came in February 1989, at the wake of the bloody riots in Caracas on 27 February, known as "Caracazo," and in February, 4 of 1992, after the failed military coup by Hugo Chaves. "The country was in crisis. Even though Caldera was one of the main architects of the system, he was one of the first to realize its weakness. So much oil (by some estimates, in the decade after the 1973 oil price surge, Venezuela received 240 billion dollars, or five times the Marshall Plan) had led not just to dependence but widespread corruption and growing resentment from the popular sectors left off the gravy train".

In these speeches, Caldera insisted on the need to recognize the root causes of the crisis and the growing weakening of the people's faith in democratic values and institutions. One month after the February 1992 coup, he delivered a memorable speech at Universidad Central de Venezuela condemning the country's history with military dictatorships and coups d'état. He urged students to reject violent paths and search for answers to the crisis without abandoning the principles and mechanisms of democracy.

The 1961 Constitution did not allow former presidents to run again before ten years had elapsed after leaving office. In 1983, Caldera became eligible again and was chosen by his party COPEI to run against Jaime Lusinchi, the candidate of the opposition party AD, who won the presidential election. In 1993, Caldera ran for president as an independent candidate, with the support of a new party, National Convergence, which allowed members and sympathizers of COPEI to support his candidacy. He also received the support from a coalition of 17 small parties dismissed by opponents as "chiripas" (small cockroaches). Caldera won the presidency with almost 400.000 votes over his closest opponent Claudio Fermín, the candidate of AD. As it had been the case in his first administration, Caldera had to govern with an opposition majority in Congress.

=== Second term in office (1994–1999) ===
Venezuelan Presidential election 1993
Candidates	Votes	%
Rafael Caldera	1,710,722	30.46%
Claudio Fermín	1,325,287	23.60%
Oswaldo Alvarez Paz	1,276,506	22.73%
Andrés Velásquez	1,232,653	21.95%
Abstention:	3,859,579	39.84%
Total votes:	5,829,216	

Caldera's second administration inherited and faced three adversities of great magnitude: a steep decrease in oil prices, the economic recession and high inflation of 1993, and a huge banking crisis. Caldera's government chose to respond to the fiscal deficit with a severe austerity plan that included a ten per cent cut of the federal budget in 1994 and, simultaneously, a reform of fiscal legislation and the creation of SENIAT, a new tax collection agency. In January 1994, less than a month before Rafael Caldera's inauguration, the second largest bank in Venezuela, Banco Latino, failed and was taken over by the government. As of October 1994, the government had seized more than ten failed banks. As René Salgado explains in his research on government and economics in Venezuela, "the government's bailout of the financial sector guaranteed approximately 6 billion dollars to depositors, which represented roughly 75 percent of the annual national budget and an alarming 13 percent of the gross domestic product. Additional bank failures continued throughout the year and into 1995".

In agreement with the International Monetary Fund, Caldera implemented in 1996 a new economic plan, called Agenda Venezuela, which "increased domestic fuel prices, liberalized interest rates, unified the exchange rate system under a temporary float, abolished controls on current and capital transactions, eliminated price controls (except for medicines), and strengthened the social safety net".

In 1997, gross domestic product (GDP) grew above five per cent and inflation rate was cut in half. The 1997 Asian financial crisis, however, brought oil prices to dramatic low levels, forcing government to make large budget cuts.

A noteworthy achievement in this administration was the tripartite agreement over labor benefits, social security, and pension funds, reached between labor unions, the private business sector, and the State, after ten years of stalled negotiations.

The fight against corruption was a central priority in Caldera's second term. In March 1996, as the GlobalSecurity organization describes, "an epochal event occurred, hardly creating a ripple in the world press. In its third plenary session, the members of the Organization of American States (OAS) adopted the Inter-American Convention against Corruption. The Convention is often referred to as the Caldera Convention, after the President of Venezuela, who was one of the driving forces behind it".

President Caldera also insisted on making corruption the central theme of the VII Ibero-American Summit of Heads State and Government, hosted by Venezuela in 1997. The renowned Venezuelan economist Moises Naím, a former member of Pérez' ministerial cabinet, and an outspoken critic of Caldera, argues that despite these efforts, Caldera's administration was however "particularly ineffectual in bringing to justice the many regulators and bankers responsible for the country's massive banking crisis".

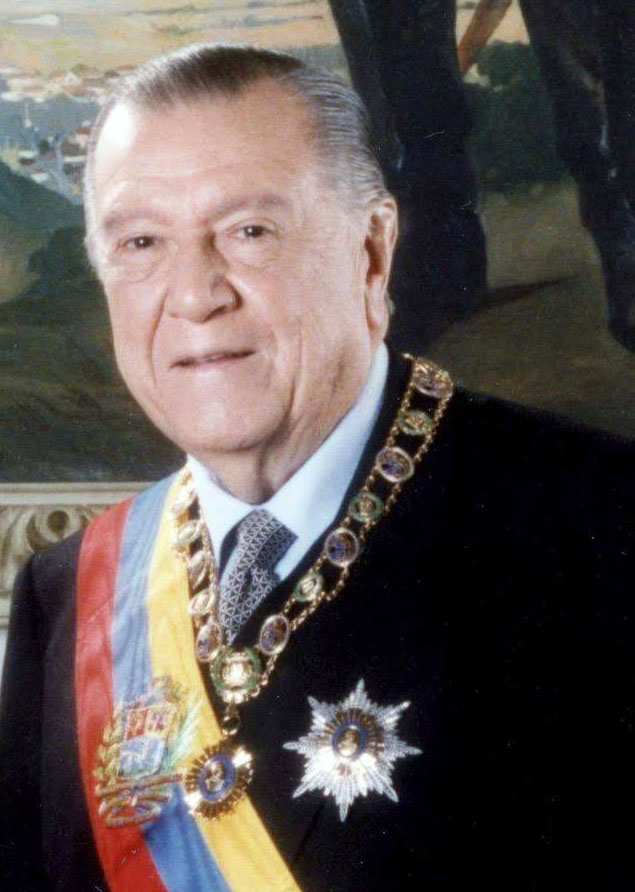
Caldera during his second term, 1994

Notwithstanding federal budget limitations, Caldera's administration developed major infrastructure projects, including two water dams the Macagua II in Guayana and the Taguaza in Caracas; the regional central aqueduct in Valencia; the Mérida-El Vigía superhighway and portions of the Centro-Occidental, José Antonio Páez, and Rómulo Betancourt highways. This administration also concluded Line 3 of the Caracas Metro, the Jacobo Borges and the Cruz-Diez museums, and brought to near completion the Caracas-Cúa railroad and the Yacambú-Quíbor hydrological complex.

At the beginning of his second term, Caldera pardoned the military officers responsible for the failed coups of 4 February and 27 November 1992, a policy aimed at pacifying the insurgent military force. Many critics question in hindsight Caldera's decision. Hugo Chávez rose to popularity and won the presidential election in 1998. The pervasiveness of this criticism grew hand in hand with Chávez's policies, to the point that many have come to blame Caldera for Chávez's and afterwards Nicolás Maduro's governments.

This body of work increased significantly after the academic events organized to commemorate the 100th anniversary of Caldera's birth. Parallel efforts on the legacy of Betancourt, Leoni, Villalba, Pérez, Herrera Campíns, and Calvani.

== Political thought ==
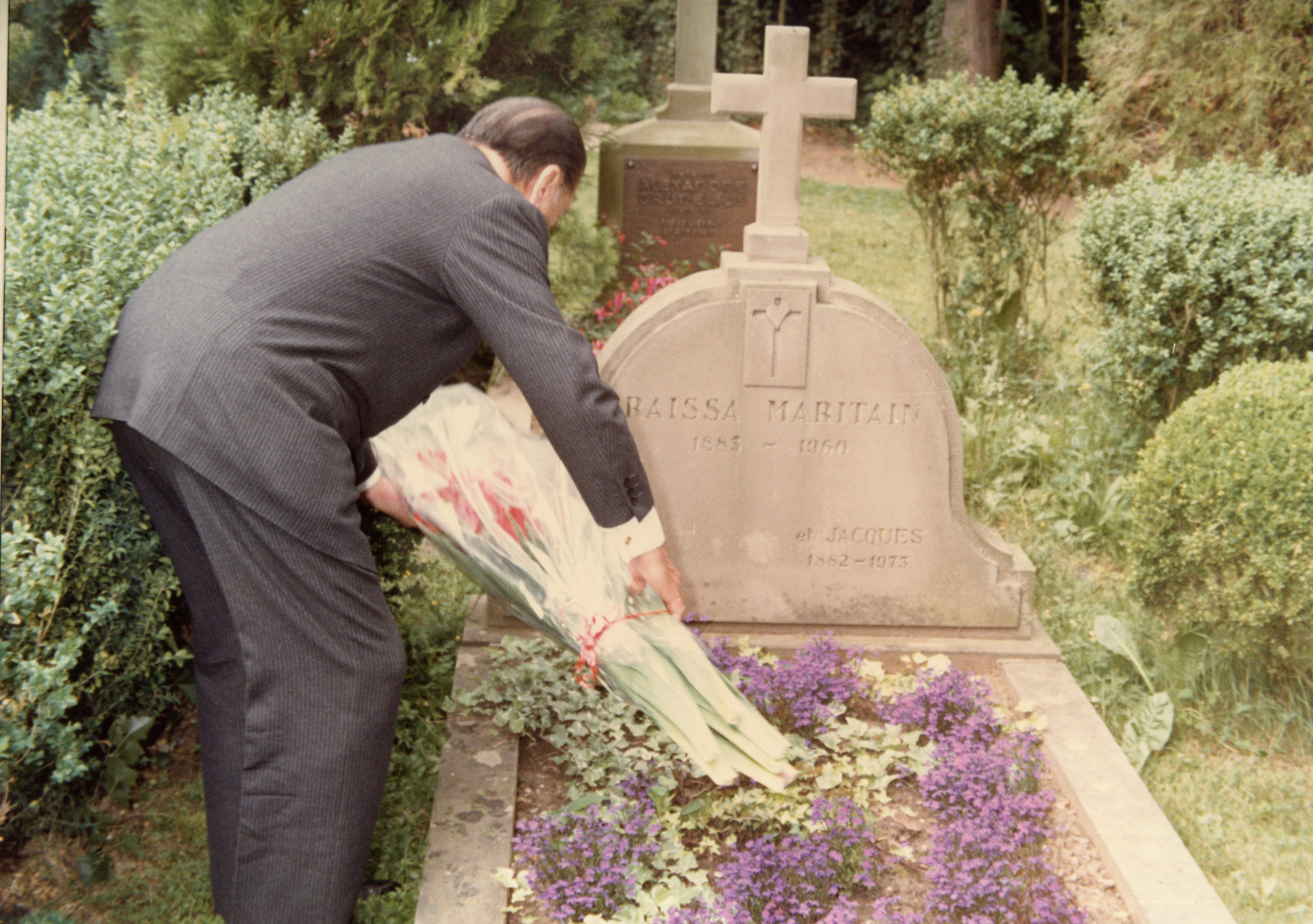
Rafael Caldera paying tribute at the tombs of Raissa and Jacques Maritain, Kolbsheim, Alsace, France. 1 July 1981.

Caldera pioneered the introduction of Christian Democracy into Latin America. He explained that Christian Democrats understand democracy in the light of Christian philosophy, and Christianity in its living democratic manifestation. For Caldera, Christian Democracy was not a middle point between liberalism and socialism. He saw it as a specific political alternative to laissez-faire capitalism and Marxist socialism. Caldera rejected Marxist ideas of dialectical materialism and class struggle, but he was also convinced that capitalism without social safeguards produces a grossly inequitable society.

Caldera published several books and countless booklets and speeches on Christian Democratic ideals, including Ideario: La Democracia Cristiana en América Latina (1970), Justicia Social Internacional y Nacionalismo Latinoamericano (1973), El Bien Común Universal y la Justicia Social Internacional (1976), and Reflexiones de la Rábida (1976).

His Especificidad de la Democracia Cristiana (Christian Democracy) (1972), a handbook of Christian democratic principles and programmatic ideas, has been translated into several languages, including English, German, Portuguese, Italian, Russian, Romanian, and Polish. In this book, Caldera develops a conception of democracy that integrates personalist, pluralistic, communitarian, participatory and organic dimensions.

This understanding of democracy, Caldera explains, rests upon foundational principles of Christian philosophy: affirmation of the spiritual, the subordination of politics to ethical norms, the dignity of the human person, the primacy of the common good, and the perfectibility of civil society. Caldera describes the concept of integral human development, the fundamental value of labor, the social function and forms of property, the role of the State in social life, the principle of subsidiarity, the defense of the rights of social groups, and the concept of international social justice. He viewed these principles as a set of political ideas committed to social justice and inspired by the Catholic social teaching.

The concept of "international social justice" was perhaps Caldera's most unique and original contribution to the body of Christian Democratic thought. In the speech he delivered to the joint session of the US Congress in 1970, he explained:

I believe in international social justice. Recalling Aristotle's old aphorism that justice demands that we render "to each his own" may I remind you that in the transformation of his thought in Christian philosophy, "his own" does not evoke exclusively that which belongs to each individual but also the idea of that which belongs to "society" for the "common good". No difficulty lies in transferring this concept onto the international community.

Just as "society" in the international ambit has the right to impose distinct types of relationships on its members, so the "international community," if it exists, demands that the various nations participate in proportion to their capacity in order that "all" may lead what could be termed a human existence. The rights and the obligations of the different countries should be measured, therefore, in terms of its potential and the needs of each one, making peace, progress, and harmony viable, and making it possible for us all to advance within a true friendship…

One of the most important aspects of the present drama is that international life, in spite of the multiplication of organizations and programs, some of them very noble and useful, has not yet had full consciousness of the existence of an international community… Instead of being ruled by the norms of human solidarity, international life is still tied to norms, concepts and procedures taken from obsolete systems of moral and juridical individualism, in spite of the fact that in the internal life of nations this individualism has been suffering for a long time one defeat after another…The idea of "common good" has not been elevated into a universal. The notion of social justice is still confined to the internal order of the individual state.

The idea of social justice which opened the way to one of the most interesting stages of human history gave rise to new branches of law, beginning with labor laws. It transformed archaic juridical systems based upon individualism. It opened roads to the establishment of a new balance and protected the organization of the weak so that they could be on a par, in doing juridical business, with those who had more strength, especially in those things related to economic power. But the victory of social justice is still incomplete, confined to the limits of the domestic law of each country… The obligation of parties in international relations are based on the old laissez-faire underpinning.

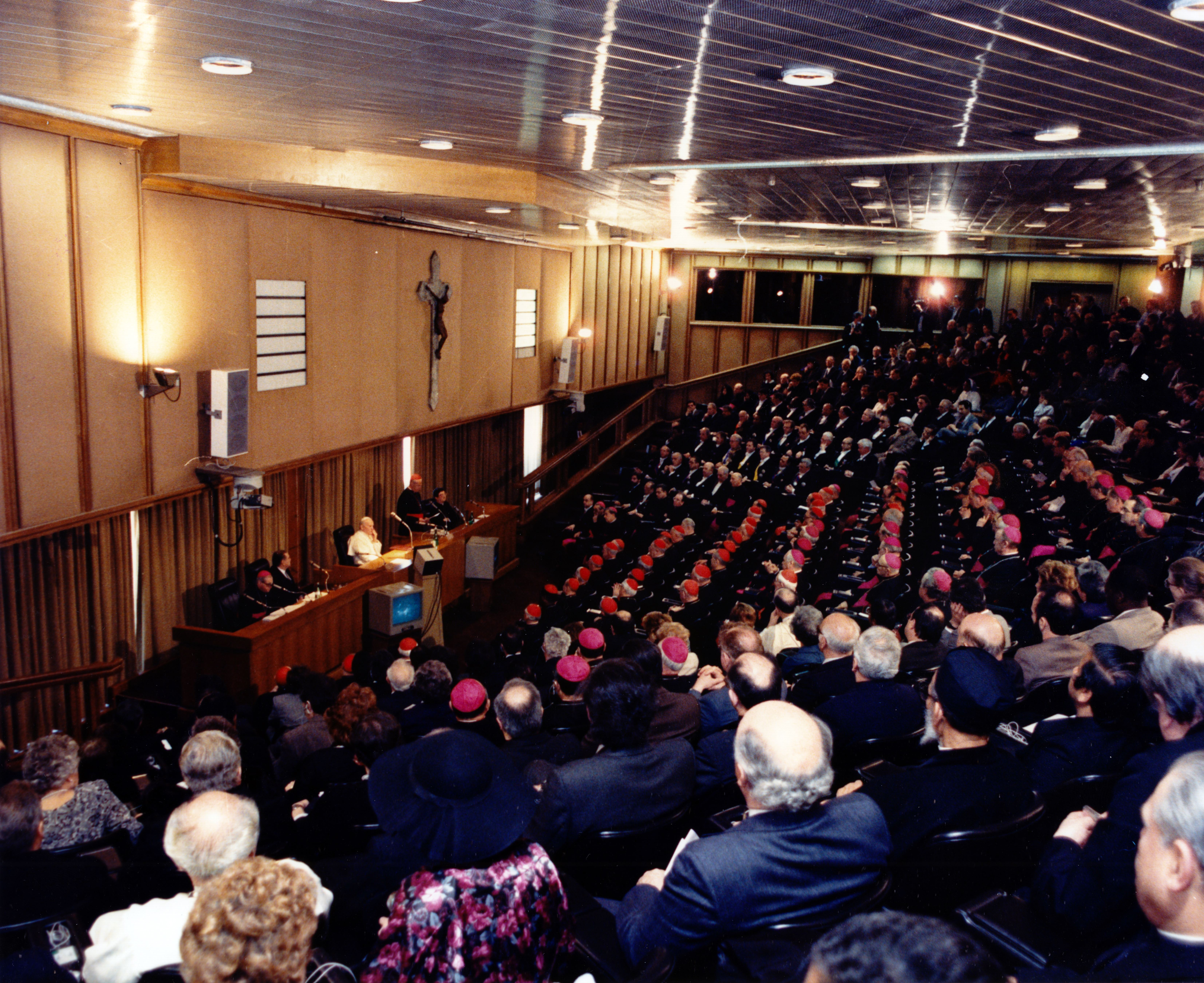
Rafael Caldera's speech in commemoration of the 20th anniversary of the encyclical Populorum Progressio. Vatican City, 24 March 1987.

The substance of Caldera's concept of international social justice gradually influenced the social doctrine of the Catholic Church, beginning with Pope John XXIII's Encyclical Mater et Magistra. Eventually, the term itself was included in official Vatican documents. Pope Paul VI, for instance, in a letter written to the Secretary General of the United Nations, on the occasion of the Extraordinary General Assembly devoted to the study of the problem of raw materials and development, wrote: "The Church is firmly convinced that any acceptable solution must be based upon international social justice and upon human solidarity through which those principles can be practically applied.

Perhaps there is no statement that better captures the essence of Caldera's political ideals than the words that Pope John Paul II used in his address to President Caldera on 5 May 1995, on the occasion of the Venezuelan President's visit to the Vatican:

In the last few decades, Venezuela has known how to combine the reality of significant economic progress with the development of a program of freedom in the framework of a constitutional state and a sound democratic system, with the traditional yearning to implement Simon Bolivar's commitment to America and his dream to build a great nation, "less because of its size and wealth than because of its freedom and glory (cf. Letter from Kingston, 6 September 1915). . . It is just as important to stress the validity of the principle of the common good, with the double objective of serving each and every Venezuelan man and woman, and meeting their most basic needs, their noblest expectations, their loftiest personal and family aspirations on the one hand, and on the other, "to promote a human State," that is, to draft and implement policies destined to combat extreme wretchedness and poverty until they are totally eradicated to overcome unemployment and social marginalization by the creation of work and a just distribution of wealth…

== Intellectual and academic life ==
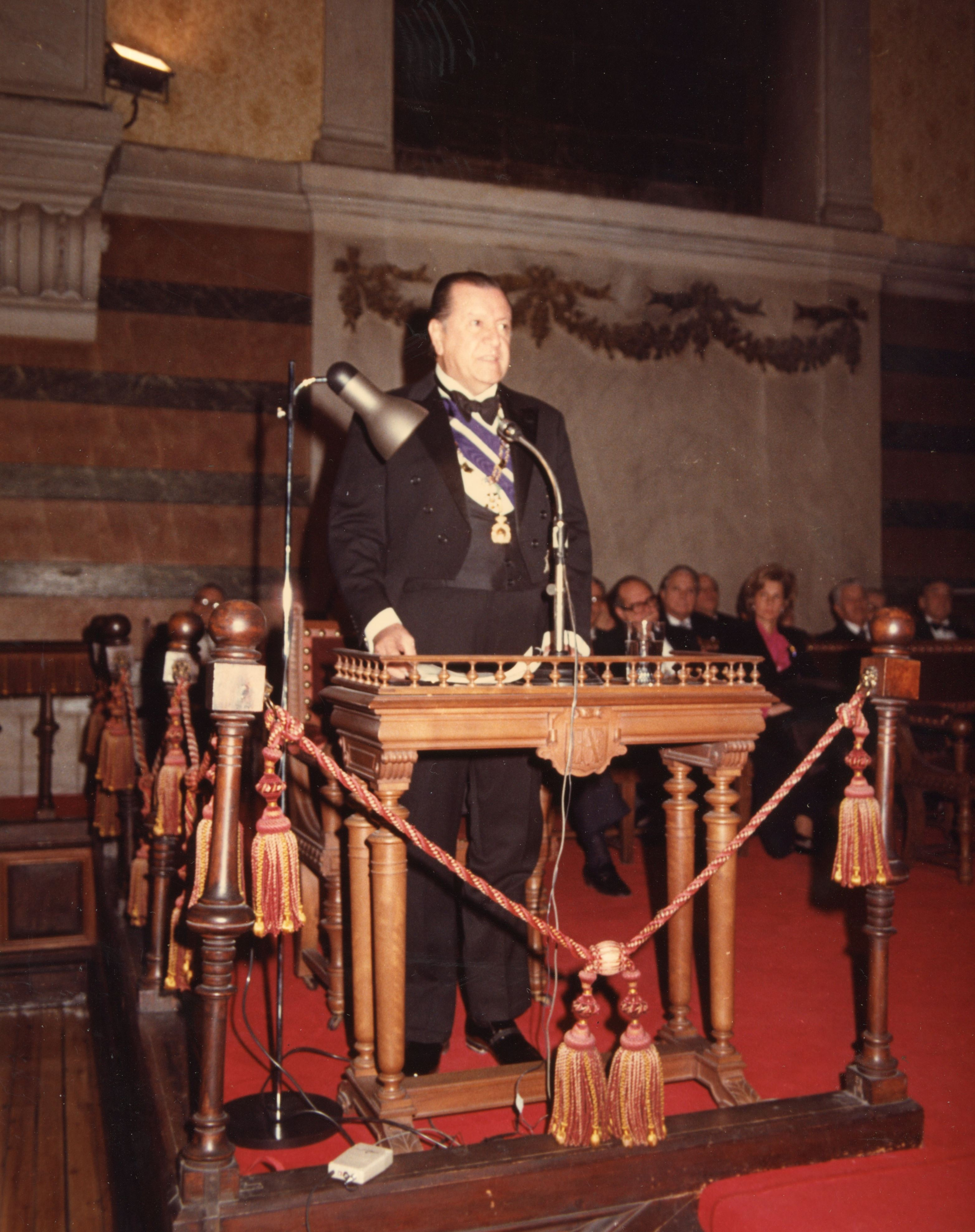
Rafael Caldera at the Royal Spanish Academy, during the solemn session in honor to the 200th Anniversary of Andrés Bello's birth. 6 December 1981.

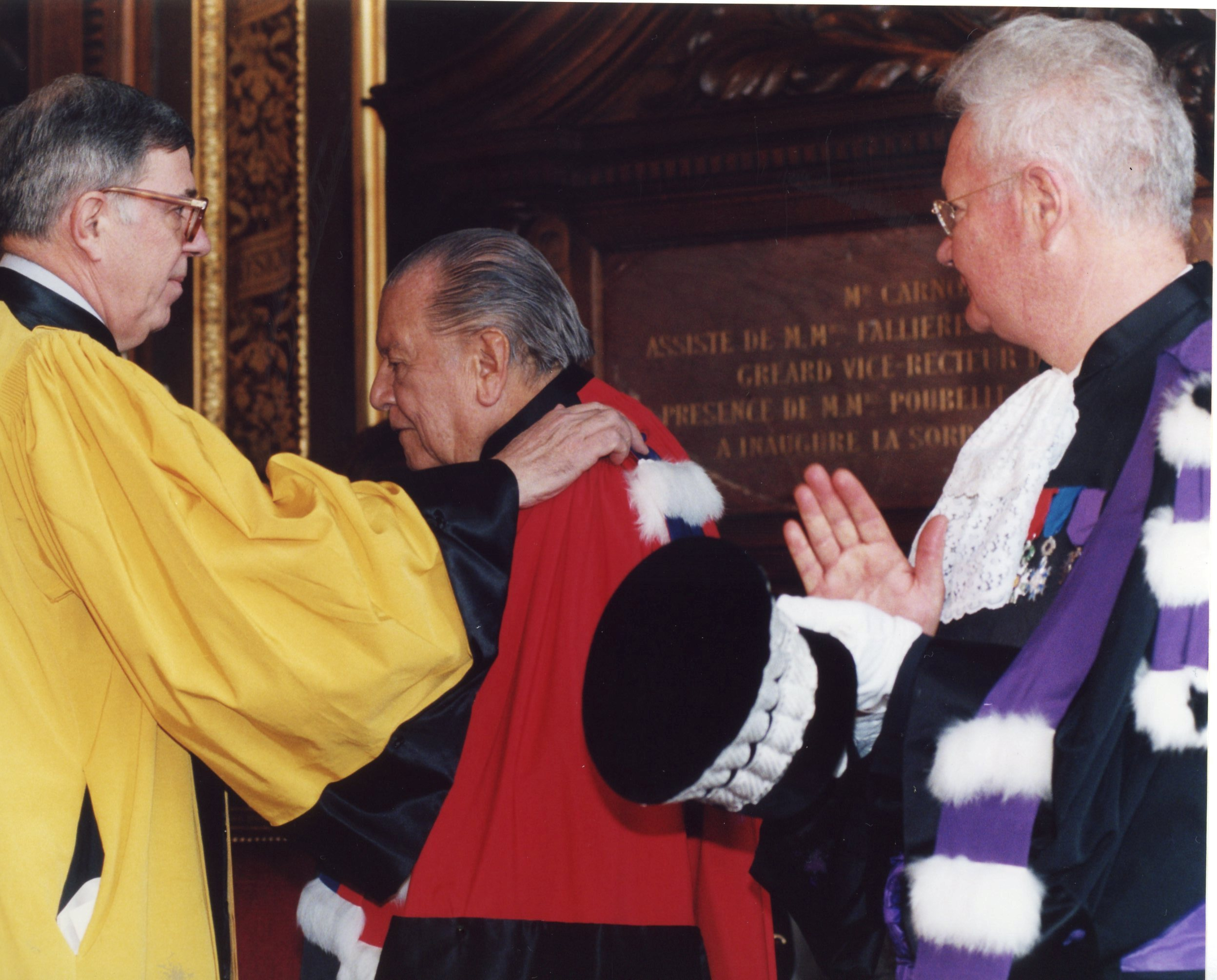
Rafael Caldera receiving the Honoris Causa degree from Paris-Sorbonne University. 22 March 1998.

Caldera served as president of Venezuela and was an essayist and orator. Although he did not stay longer than one month outside Venezuela, he spoke English, French, Italian, German, and Portuguese.

A full professor in Labor Law and Juridical Sociology at Central University of Venezuela and Andrés Bello Catholic University, in Caracas, he taught almost without interruption from 1943 to 1968. Throughout his lifetime, Caldera was bestowed with honorary doctorates, degrees, and professorships from a dozen universities and academies in Venezuela, and from thirty universities worldwide, including: the University of Louvain (1979), in Belgium; Perugia (1973), in Italy; Hebrew of Jerusalem (1981), in Israel; Notre Dame (1964) and the Catholic University of America (1980), in the United States; Renmin (1993), in China; and The Sorbonne (1998), in France. The distinction Caldera most cherished, however, was the Honorary Professor award with which his alma mater, Central University of Venezuela, unanimously honored him in 1976.

In 1953, Caldera was elected to the Venezuelan National Academy of Political and Social Sciences. His induction speech was entitled "Idea de una sociología venezolana", an exposition of key elements for the development of sociological studies in the country. In 1967, he was elected to the Venezuelan National Academy of Language. He devoted his induction speech, "El lenguaje como vínculo social y la integración latinoamericana" to language as a social link for Latin American integration.

Throughout his life, Caldera maintained his passion for the Venezuelan man-of-letters Andrés Bello. To his early book Andrés Bello, he added a considerable number of essays, prologues, and book chapters, including, among others, "El pensamiento jurídico y social de Andrés Bello" (1988), "Andrés Bello: Bicentenario de su nacimiento" (1981), and "Caracas, Londres, Santiago de Chile: Las tres etapas de la vida de Bello" (1981).

Caldera also wrote extensively on key personalities and events in Venezuela's history. His book Bolivar siempre is a collection of essays on the timeliness of Simon Bolivar's political ideals. To this genre also belong such texts as "El general Páez de a pie" (1940), "Antonio José de Sucre: Demasiado joven para tanta gloria" (1980), "Eleazar López Contreras, lindero y puente entre dos épocas" (1973), and "Andrés Eloy Blanco, el amortiguador de la Constituyente" (1958), compiled many of them in different editions of the book Moldes para la fragua.

Especially notable is the monograph Caldera dedicated to the analysis of Romulo Betancourt's foundational role in the construction of Venezuela's democracy, "La parábola vital de Rómulo Betancourt" (1988).

The various texts Caldera devoted to reflections on the intersection between faith and public service are key to understand the spiritual drive behind his unwavering commitment to political and intellectual pursuits. Any thorough analysis of the life and works of Rafael Caldera must include La Hora de Emaús (1956), as well as such texts as "Aquel obrero que llamamos Cristo"(1956), "Lo político y lo religioso dentro de lo social, a propósito de Luigi Sturzo" (1953), "Jacques Maritain: Fe en Dios y en el pueblo" (1980), "Los valores cristianos" (1971), and the commencement speech "Un mensaje de fe" (1971), that Caldera delivered at the high school graduation ceremony of his son Andrés.

== Last years and death ==
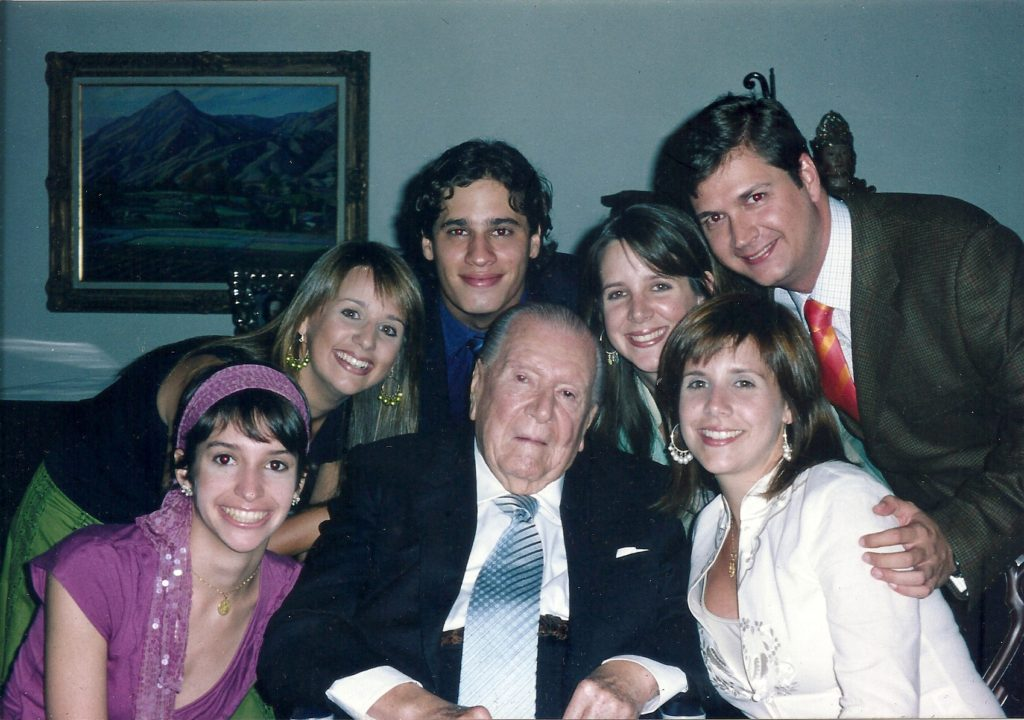
Rafael Caldera's 90th birthday celebration with six grandchildren. Caldera-Pietri's residence. Tinajero, 24 January 2006.

At the conclusion of his presidency, Caldera returned to his home, just as he did at the end of his first term. He was known for living simply and eschewing luxuries, and for being an honorable public servant in a country where corruption is pervasive. In 1999, when President Hugo Chávez called for a constituent assembly, Caldera protested against the violation of the 1961 Constitution. Allan Brewer-Carías, a Venezuelan legal scholar and elected member of this assembly, explains that this constitution-making body was an instrument for the gradual dismantling of democratic institutions and values.

In 1999, Caldera published his last book, De Carabobo a Puntofijo: Los Causahabientes (From Carabobo to Puntofijo, The Causates), a political history of Venezuela from 1830 to 1958. This book includes in its postscript an assessment of Venezuela's democratic experience from 1958 to 1999, and criticism of the Bolivarian government.

Gravely affected by Parkinson's disease, Caldera gradually withdrew from public view and died in his home on Christmas Eve 2009.

A family man and devout Catholic, he married Alicia Pietri Montemayor on 6 August 1941. They had six children: Mireya, Rafael Tomás, Juan José, Alicia Helena, Cecilia and Andrés. At the time of his death, the couple had twelve grandchildren and five great-grandchildren. Pietri died a little more than a year after her husband, on 9 February 2011.

== Works ==
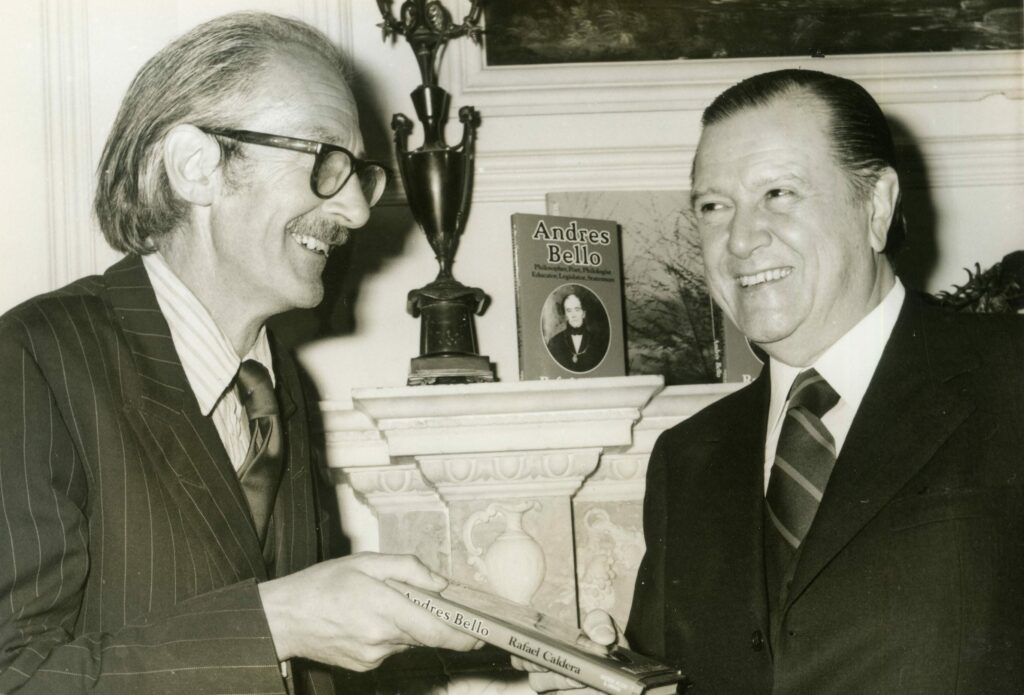
Caldera during the presentation in London of the English translation of his biography about humanist Andrés Bello (1977).

- Andrés Bello (1935)
- Derecho del trabajo (1939)
- El Bloque Latinoamericano (1961)
- Moldes para la fragua (1962)
- Democracia Cristiana y Desarrollo (1964)
- Ideario. La democracia cristiana en América Latina (1970)
- Especificidad de la democracia cristiana (1972)
- Temas de sociología venezolana (1973)
- Justicia social internacional y Nacionalismo latinoamericano (1973)
- La nacionalización del petróleo (1975)
- Reflexiones de la Rábida (1976)
- Parlamento mundial: una voz latinoamericana (1984)
- Bolívar siempre (1987)
- Los causahabientes, de Carabobo a Puntofijo (1999)

=== Rafael Caldera Library ===
- La Venezuela civil, constructores de la república (2014)
- Los desafíos a la gobernabilidad democrática (2014)
- Justicia Social Internacional (2014)
- Frente a Chávez (2015)
- Andrés Bello (2015)
- Moldes para la fragua. Nueva Serie (2016)
- Ganar la patria (2016)
- De Carabobo a Puntofijo (2017)
- Derecho al Trabajo (2017)

== Honors ==
=== Selected honors in Venezuela ===
- Order "Libertador" (Collar).
- Order "Francisco de Miranda" (Brilliant).
- Order "Andres Bello" (Collar).
- Order "José María Vargas" (Central University of Venezuela).
- Medal "Antonio José de Sucre".
- Order "Estrella de Carabobo", Venezuelan Army.

=== Selected honors from Latin American countries ===
- Argentina: Collar Order of the Liberator General San Martín.
- Bolivia: Great Collar Order of the Condor of the Andes.
- Brazil: Great Collar Order of the Southern Cross.
- Peru: Great Brilliant Cross Order of the Sun of Peru.
- Colombia: Great Collar Order of Boyaca.
- Colombia: Collar "Orden Nacional de Miguel Antonio Caro y Rufino José Cuervo".
- Chile: Order Grade Great Official "Simon Bolívar".
- Ecuador: Great Collar "Orden Nacional al Mérito".
- Paraguay: Collar "Orden Mariscal Francisco Solano López".
- Mexico: Collar Order of the Aztec Eagle.
- El Salvador: Great Extraodriary Cross Order of José Matías Delgado.
- Dominican Republic: Order of Christopher Columbus.
- Uruguay: Medal of the Oriental Republic of Uruguay.

=== Selected honors from European countries ===
- Vatican City: Grand Cross of the Pian Order.
- Netherlands: Orde van de Nederlandse Leeuw.
- Netherlands: Saint Gregorio Magno Magna Cross.
- Romania: Star Order of the Socialist Republic of Romania.
- Spain: Collar of the Order "Isabel La Católica".
- Spain: Great Military Cross of Order of Charles III.
- Rome: Order "Cavaliere di Gran Croce".
- Lithuania: Order of Vytautas the Great
- Portugal: Great Collar of the Infante Dom Henrique of the Government of Portugal.
- France: Great Cross Legion of Honour of the French Republic.

== See also ==
- Presidents of Venezuela
- Political prisoners in Venezuela

Party political offices
Preceded by — Luis Herrera Campins (1978)	COPEI presidential candidate 1947 (lost); 1958 (lost); 1963 (lost); 1968 (won); 1983 (lost)	Succeeded by Lorenzo Fernánndez (1973); Eduardo Fernández (1988)
Preceded by —	National Convergence presidential candidate 1993 (won)	Succeeded by —
Political offices
Preceded by Raúl Leoni	President of Venezuela; 1969–1974	Succeeded by Carlos Andrés Pérez
Preceded by Ramón J. Velásquez	President of Venezuela; 1994–1999	Succeeded by Hugo Chávez
