= Assassination of Carlos Delgado Chalbaud =

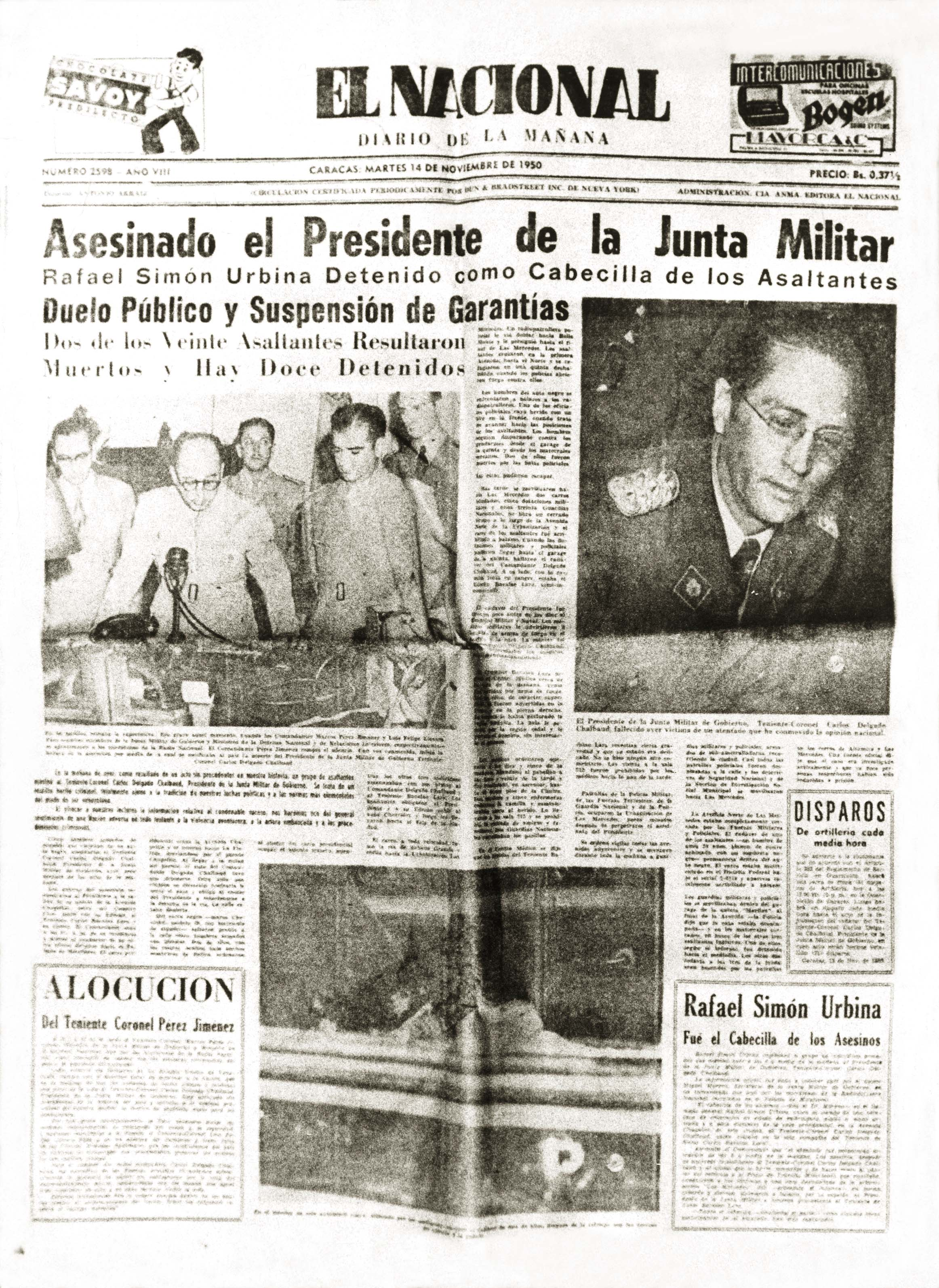
Page of El Nacional regarding the assassination of Carlos Delgado Chalbaud

The assassination of Carlos Delgado Chalbaud was the murder of the Venezuelan politician Carlos Delgado Chalbaud, a member of the Government Junta that presided over a military dictatorship in the country, which occurred in 1950 at the hands of Domingo Urbina, Carlos Mijares, and Pedro Antonio Díaz during his kidnapping in Caracas, led by Rafael Simón Urbina. It is the only assassination of a president in the history of Venezuela.

Urbina intended to extort Delgado Chalbaud to force him to resign from the presidency of the Military Government Junta. However, Chalbaud's death was never fully clarified regarding Urbina's true intentions after he was killed by the Dirección de Seguridad Nacional.

== Background ==
After the 1948 Venezuelan coup d'état, the military junta outlawed some of the main political parties and banned meetings, but this caused much political friction. In early 1950, the Junta discussed the possibility of dissolving itself and calling elections in which Carlos Delgado Chalbaud would be a presidential candidate.

== History ==
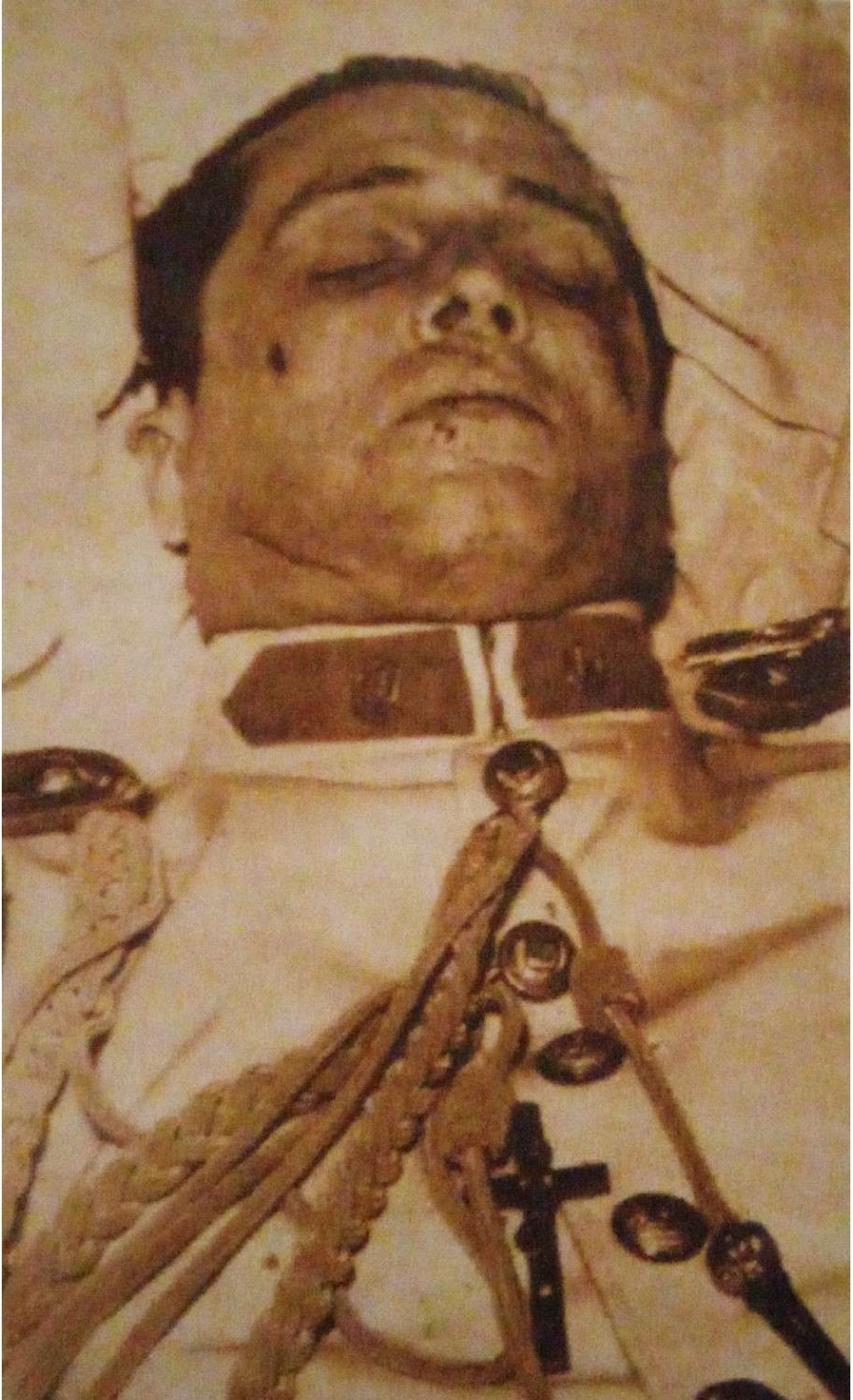
Body of Carlos Delgado Chalbaud

Urbina had briefly served as president of Amazonas state during the presidency of Eleazar López Contreras, and after the 1945 coup d'état, he embarked on his fourth exile to Haiti, Colombia, and the Dominican Republic. While abroad, he was tried by the Jury of Civil and Administrative Responsibility, which confiscated all his assets. When Rómulo Gallegos's government fell with the 1948 coup d'état, he contacted Carlos Delgado Chalbaud through a contact, which allowed him to return to the country, which he did in 1950. He settled at the home of that contact, Antonio Aranguren, a friend of his father, while he asked the State for the restitution of his confiscated assets.

The restitution was ignored. Urbina became upset with Chalbaud over this attitude, and planned and attempted a kidnapping of the president at the very house where he resided, in apparent cooperation with Aranguren. That house was located near Chalbaud's house in the Country Club.

Delgado Chalbaud was in the presidential vehicle, a 1947 Cadillac Imperial limousine, accompanied by his aide‑de‑camp, Lieutenant Carlos Bacalao Lara, his driver Felipe Figueroa, and his bodyguard, surnamed Aponte, when he was ambushed by about 20 men near a staged traffic accident and taken to Aranguren's Quinta Maritza.

The kidnapping went wrong. A bullet escaped from Díaz, wounding Urbina and shattering his ankle. It is alleged that this event destabilized the kidnapping and made Domingo Urbina (Rafael Simón Urbina's cousin), Carlos Mijares, and Pedro Antonio Díaz nervous, who then put Delgado Chalbaud against a wall and executed him. Simón Urbina escaped and took refuge in the Nicaraguan Embassy in Venezuela, from where he dictated a letter to Marcos Pérez Jiménez, which read:

"Since I arrived in the country, I wished for you to be the president; Commander Delgado Chalbaud is seriously wounded; I am in the same condition at the Nicaraguan embassy, where I ask for your protection."

However, he was removed by a government commission and subsequently taken to the Obispo prison, being killed during his transfer to the Cárcel Modelo in Caracas by members of the Dirección de Seguridad Nacional. Aranguren was arrested and imprisoned in December of that year but released months later without his involvement in the crime being proven.

== Aftermath ==
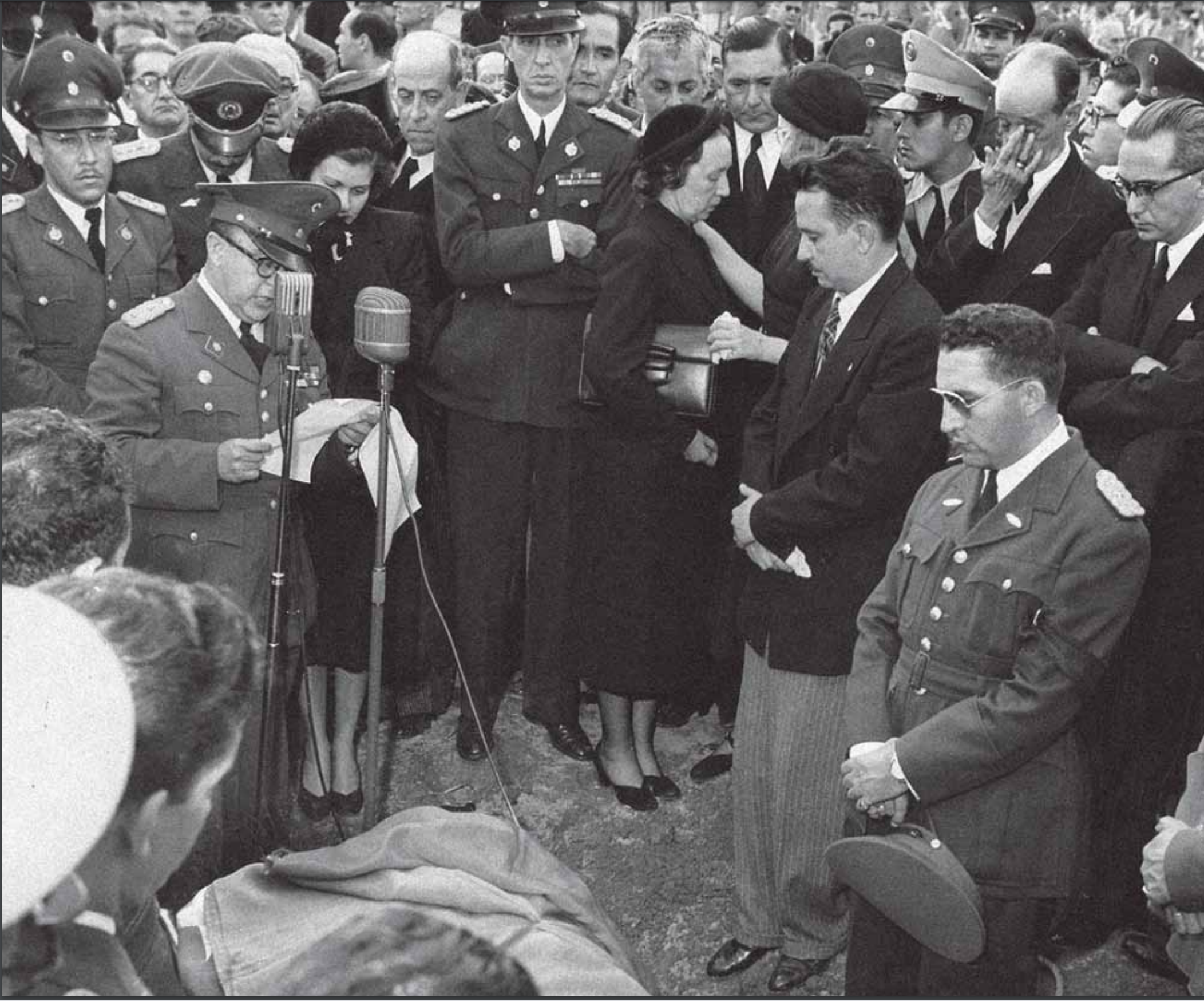
Funeral of Carlos Delgado Chalbaud

The news was made public by General Marcos Pérez Jiménez. The assassination of Carlos Delgado Chalbaud caused shock in Venezuelan society and led to the assumption of Germán Suárez Flamerich.

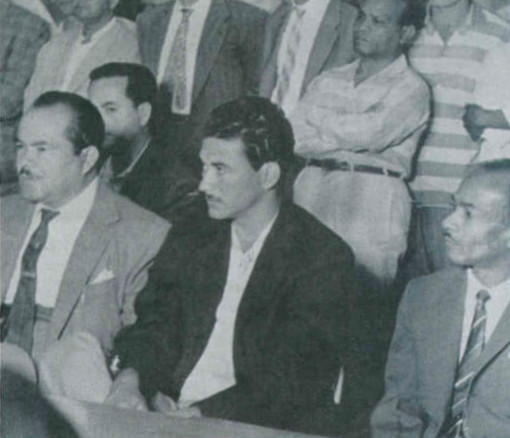
Trial of those responsible for the assassination of Carlos Delgado Chalbaud

In 1963, within the framework of the trial against Marcos Pérez Jiménez, a sentence was issued against Ramón Norato Useche for the murder of Rafael Simón Urbina and against Miguel Antonio Soto for complicity in the act, who were subsequently imprisoned.

== Hypotheses ==
The death of Rafael Simón Urbina and the arrest of the armed group without clear ideological connections gave rise to speculation about the reasons behind the death of the president of the Junta. A popular hypothesis is that it was Marcos Pérez Jiménez who ordered the murder of Carlos Delgado Chalbaud; however, this has been questioned, since Pérez Jiménez's wife, Flor María Chalbaud, was Delgado Chalbaud's cousin.
