= Manifesto of Intellectuals on the National Political Situation =

Manifesto of the Intellectuals on the National Political Situation
- Original title: Manifiesto de los intelectuales sobre la situación política nacional
- Created: January 10, 1958
- Date effective: January 15, 1958 (Note: Some sources report the publication date as 14 January 1958.)
- Location: Venezuela
- Author(s): Mariano Picón Salas
- Signatories: Approximately 400
- Media type: Print
- Subject: Political situation in Venezuela (1958)
- Purpose: Criticism of the Marcos Pérez Jiménez dictatorship; call for democracy and human rights

The Manifesto of the Intellectuals on the National Political Situation was a public statement issued in Venezuela on 15 January 1958, denouncing the dictatorship of Marcos Pérez Jiménez and outlining eight key demands. Written by Mariano Picón Salas, the document was signed by more than 400 intellectuals, including writers, academics, and professionals.

== History ==
The text was drafted on 10 January 1958 by Picón Salas and printed clandestinely in a small press operated by the Communist Party of Venezuela (PCV). Its first edition came out of the Prensa Médica magazine press, directed by Ángel Bajares Lanza. The initiative was promoted by figures such as Fabricio Ojeda, Miguel Otero Silva, Pedro Ortega Díaz (PCV), Rafael José Neri, Alexis Márquez Rodríguez, Arístides Bastidas, Francisco Guerrero Pulido, Humberto Cuenca, and Isaac Pardo, who met in the archives of El Nacional. The manifesto received backing from the Journalists' Association, labor unions, and civil organizations.

On 13 January, two days before publication, Pérez Jiménez dismissed Rómulo Fernández as Minister of Defense and personally assumed the post.

The document was released on 15 January. Miguel Otero Silva was arrested by the Dirección de Seguridad Nacional for his participation in editing and publishing the text.

== Content ==
The manifesto condemned the dictatorship and articulated eight demands, including democracy, freedom of expression, the end of censorship, release of political prisoners, and return of exiles. It declared that "the country cannot remain divided into hostile groups of exiles, captives, and beneficiaries of wealth." Key points included:

- "the reestablishment of a dignified moral life"
- "austerity in the management of the Nation's resources"
- "recognition of the values of the spirit without which no material progress makes sense and an agreement among the forces of the citizenry so that Venezuelan culture may develop in an environment of freedom"
- "adherence to the traditional norms of international coexistence, after the frictions that separated us from some sister nations"

It further urged that "public authorities [be] a genuine expression of the popular will," advocated respect for ecclesiastical authorities, teachers, and students, and called for restoration of university autonomy. It emphasized that it did not seek confrontation with the military, stating that "the citizenry does not wish to establish an antagonistic division between the Armed Forces and civilian forces, but rather a respectful and fair cooperation to achieve national concord," advocating "harmony among Venezuelans."

== Promoters and signatories ==
Approximately 400 intellectuals signed the manifesto, including prominent writers, academics, and professionals. Some of them were:

- Mariano Picón Salas
- Adriano González León
- Alejandro Otero
- Alexis Márquez Rodríguez
- Ángel Rosenblat
- Antonio Estévez
- Aquiles Monagas
- Arcila Farías
- Arístides Bastidas
- Arturo Uslar Pietri
- Barrios Cruz
- Carlos Dorante
- César Rengifo
- Díaz Seijas
- Eduardo Arcila Farías
- Elias Toro
- Enrique J. Velutini
- Ernesto Mayz Vallenilla
- Falcón Briceño
- Francisco De Venanzi
- Francisco Pulido Guerrero
- Guillent Pérez
- Héctor Mujica
- Herrera Luque
- Humberto Cuenca
- Isaac J. Pardo
- José Antonio Calcaño
- José Luis Vethencourt
- José Nucete Sardi
- Juan Liscano
- Juan Manuel González
- Jóvito Villalba
- Lucila Palacios
- Manuel Montaner
- Martín Vegas
- Mateo Manaure
- Miguel Acosta Saignes
- Miguel Arroyo Castillo
- Miguel Otero Silva
- Márquez Cañizales
- Óscar Machado Zuloaga
- Oswaldo Vigas
- Pedro Laya
- Pedro Ortega Díaz
- Pedro Pérez Velásquez
- Ramón Palomares
- Salcedo Bastardo
- Sergio Antillano
- Vicente Emilio Sojo
- Vicente Gerbasi

== See also ==
- 1957 Venezuelan referendum
- 1958 Venezuelan coup d'état
- Se llamaba SN
