= Chalbaud =

Chalbaud is a surname. Notable people with the surname include:

- Carlos Delgado Chalbaud (1909–1950), Venezuelan president and military officer
- Flor María Chalbaud (1921–2013), Venezuelan First Lady
- José-Antonio Chalbaud (born 1931), Venezuelan sports shooter
- Román Chalbaud (1931–2023), Venezuelan film director and screenwriter
- Román Delgado Chalbaud (1882–1929), Venezuelan naval officer, businessman and conspirator
