= Se llamaba SN =

Book by José Vicente Abreu

- Author: José Vicente Abreu
- Language: Spanish
- Subject: Political prisoner that is tortured by the Dirección de Seguridad Nacional
- Genre: Novel
- Set in: Orinoco Delta
- Publication date: 1964
- Publication place: Venezuela

Se llamaba SN (The name was SN) is a Venezuelan non-fiction novel. It was written by José Vicente Abreu and published in 1964.

== Plot ==
It tells the story of a political prisoner that is tortured by the Dirección de Seguridad Nacional (National Security Bureau or simply SN). The protagonist is eventually sent to a labour camp in the Orinoco Delta. The novel is based on true stories of 1950s Venezuela, during the rule of Marcos Pérez Jiménez. Many political dissidents were sent to labour camps during that time.

== Adaptation ==
A film based on the novel was released in 1977, directed by Venezuelan director Luis Correa.

== See also ==
- Torture in Venezuela
