= José Ignacio Cárdenas =

Venezuelan diplomat

Ambassador to Spain
- In office 1914–1925
- President: Juan Vicente Gómez

Personal details
- Born: 1874
- Died: 13 September 1949 (aged 74–75)
- Profession: physician, diplomat

José Ignacio Cárdenas (1874 – 13 September 1949) was a Venezuelan physician and diplomat. From 1910 to 1925 he acted as a roving Venezuelan diplomat in Europe, particularly in France, Holland, and Spain, and made reports on the activities of Venezuelan exiles, including (after returning to Europe in 1929) Román Delgado Chalbaud's Falke expedition. He received the Grand Cross of Spain's Order of Isabella the Catholic in 1921.
