= Augusto Mijares =

Minister of Education of Venezuela
- In office 1949–1950
- President: Carlos Delgado Chalbaud

Ambassador to Spain
- In office 1950–1953
- Succeeded by: Simón Becerra

Personal details
- Born: 12 November 1897 Villa de Cura, Aragua
- Died: 29 June 1979 (aged 81) Caracas, Venezuela
- Spouse: Matilde Felce Cottin
- Profession: writer, historian, schoolteacher, lawyer

Salvador Augusto Mijares Izquierdo (12 November 1897 – 29 June 1979), was a Venezuelan lawyer, historian, writer, educator and journalist. He is best known for El Libertador, his biography of Simón Bolívar. He was a member of the Venezuelan Academy of History (1947), the National Academy of Political Science (1960) and the Venezuelan Academy of Language (1971).

== Bibliography ==
- 1927 La patria de los venezolanos en 1750
- 1938 La interpretación pesimista de la sociología hispanoamericana
- 1940 Hombres e ideas de América
- 1943 Educación
- 1955 La luz y el espejo
- 1961 Ideología de la Revolución Emancipadora
- 1963 Lo afirmativo venezolano
- 1964 El Libertador (biography of Simón Bolívar)
- 1967 La evolución política de Venezuela
- 1971 Longitud y latitud

Mijares's other works include biographies of Simón Rodríguez, Fermín Toro, Rafael María Baralt and José Rafael Revenga.
