= Vytas Brenner =

Venezuelan musician (1946–2004)

- Vytas Brenner (from the vinyl album "Hermanos" – 1974)

Background information
- Born: 19 September 1946; Tübingen, Germany
- Origin: Venezuela
- Died: 18 March 2004 (aged 57) Salzburg, Austria
- Genres: Progressive rock

Vytas Brenner (19 September 1946 – 18 March 2004) was a German-born Venezuelan musician, keyboardist, guitarist and composer.

== Biography ==
Vytas Brenner was born in Tübingen, Germany, but his family migrated to Venezuela in 1949, when he was 2 years old. His mother, Margarita Brenner, was an opera singer.

Brenner began his musical studies in Caracas at "Colegio Emil Friedman" school, a prestigious institution heavily oriented toward musical education. When he was 12 years old, he moved to Italy and then to Spain, where he founded the group "Brenner's Folk", the precursor of the successful band Pic-Nic. When he was 21 years old, Vytas moved to Tennessee to study at the University of Tennessee's Music Conservatory, where he was a pupil of David Van Vactor. Later, at college in Nashville, Vytas took post-graduate courses in Electronic music with Professor Gilbert Trythall, and graduated with honors in 1972. In 1971, he started a duo named "Vytas & Mafe" with Venezuelan singer María Fernanda Márquez.

In 1972, Brenner formed his own band, "La Ofrenda" (The Offering) and recorded five successful albums until 1979. With "Ofrenda" he started his pioneer work with compositions for combinations of electric and electronic instruments (synthesizers) with acoustic instruments and piano; and blending progressive-symphonic rock, Latin rhythms, and Venezuelan traditional themes, with astounding results.

"Morrocoy" (1973), by La Ofrenda de Vytas Brenner
A representative sample of the art of a Venezuelan pioneer of progressive music.

Brenner recorded several remarkable albums, each one a breakthrough, as he was in fact developing a new genre in giant leaps. In 1982, a somewhat reunited "Ofrenda" performed at the "Teatro de Bellas Artes de Maracaibo", but was coldly received by the public, followed by strong press criticism. In 1989, the Venezuela Symphony Orchestra performed his work "Oro Negro" ("Black Gold") at the Caracas' famed Teatro Teresa Carreño. In 1989, he released the album entitled "Amazonia". He was commissioned to compose works for "Viajando con Polar", a series of short documentaries about Venezuela's regions, depicting their beautiful landscapes and rich folklore. He created music for various films, such as "Adiós Alicia", "Se llamaba SN", and playwright Román Chalbaud's "Carmen la que contaba 16 años". All the while, Brenner was a very successful studio musician, composing and performing in countless radio jingles, television commercials and presidential campaigns. At the international level, his old and rare vinyl records sell for between US$70 to US$220.

Brenner died on 18 March 2004 of a heart attack in Salzburg, Austria, at the age of 57, while recording music for an upcoming album.

== Discography ==
- La Ofrenda de Vytas (1973). Tracks: Morrocoy, Ofrenda de Miguel, Tormenta de Barlovento, Frailejon, La Sabana, Tragavenado, Araguaney, Canto de Pilón.
- Hermanos (1974). Tracks: Agua Clara, Madrugada, Amanecer, Danzas de los Pájaros, Gavilán, Pastos, Ganado, Estampida, Ana Karina Rote, Sentado en una Piedra.
- Jayeche (1975). Tracks: Cariaco, Sancocho de Médula, La Restinga, Playa de Agua, Cachunchú Florido, 6 por Electron, Jayeche, Catatumbo, Caracas para Locos, Ávila.
- En Vivo (1977). Tracks: Interludio, Morrocoy, Cachunchú Florido, La Restinga, Playa de Agua, Ganado, Cariaco, Ávila, Frailejón, Interludio.
- Ofrenda (1978). Tracks: Armonías para cantar, Mandingo, San Agustín, Acuesta, Princesa, Aguacero.
- I Belong (1981) with Paulette Dozier Tracks: I belong, I gotta feeling, I'm gonna climb that mountain, Sweet Zita, Decisions, Are you the one?, Feeling much calmer.
- Estoy Como Quiero (1982). Tracks: Dorado I, Ponte a valer, 15 partes por millón, Estoy como quiero, Acuesta (grabado en vivo, Maracaibo), Canchunchu florido (grabado en vivo, Maracaibo), Dorado II.
- Vytas (1983). Tracks: Playa Sombrero, Un amigo mas, La Chinita, Cristofue, Adicora, Hasta cuando, Amuay.
- El Vals del Mar (1986). Tracks: El vals del mar, Eres tu, Los espejos, Sentado en una piedra, Agua clara, Una rosa roja, Dos viajeros, Escalas y armonías, Estoy como quiero.
- Amazonia (1990). Tracks: Ofrenda, Karibik, A Bolívar, Techos Rojos (1er Movimiento), Techos Rojos (2do Movimiento), Aruanda, Mestizo, Guacamaya, Autana, Orinokia, Amazonia.
