= Se llamaba SN (film) =

1977 Venezuelan film

- Directed by: Luis Correa
- Written by: Luis Correa
- Starring: Asdrúbal Meléndez; José Torres; María Gracia Bianchi; Pedro Marthan; Ricardo Blanco
- Cinematography: Mariano Volpi
- Edited by: Alejandro Sandeman
- Music by: Vitas Brenner
- Distributed by: Kynocine
- Release date: 1977
- Running time: 85 minutes
- Country: Venezuela
- Language: Spanish
- Budget: $367,000

Se llamaba SN (The Name Was SN) is a 1977 film directed by Venezuelan filmmaker Luis Correa. The film is based in the homonymous 1964 novel by José Vicente Abreu, which serves as a testimony and denounces the dictatorship of Marcos Pérez Jiménez in the country.

== Plot ==
During the dictatorship of Marcos Pérez Jiménez in Venezuela, his secret police, the National Security (Seguridad Nacional), detains thousands of Venezuelans. In 1952, a political prisoner is sent at a prison located on an island a faces the conditions in jail.

== Release ==
The film was screened at the 25th San Sebastián International Film Festival, in 1977.
