= Dirección General de Policía =

General Directory of Police Dirección General de Policía
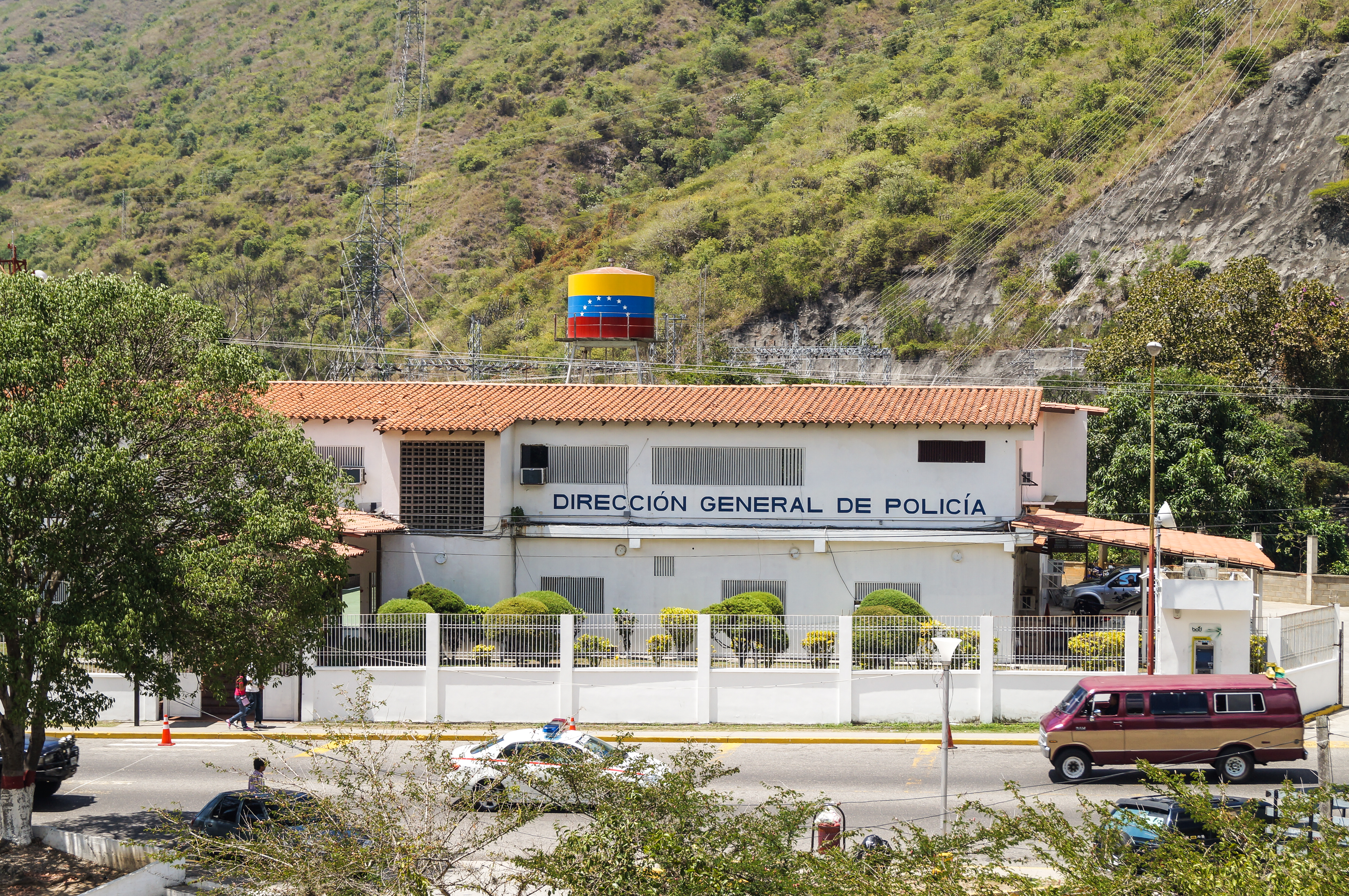
- DIGEPOL headquarters in Trujillo state.
- Abbreviation: DIGEPOL

Agency overview
- Formed: 1959; 67 years ago
- Preceding agency: Directory of National Security
- Dissolved: 19 March 1969; 57 years ago
- Superseding agency: Directorate of Intelligence and Prevention Services (DISIP)

Jurisdictional structure
- Operations jurisdiction: Venezuela

The Dirección General de Policía (DIGEPOL) was a Venezuelan police agency. DIGEPOL was created after the transition to democracy following the 1958 fall of the dictatorship of Marcos Pérez Jiménez, replacing in part the former Seguridad Nacional.

== History ==
In 1965, after being detained by DIGEPOL days before, communist professor Alberto Lovera was killed and found in a beach in Puerto La Cruz. President Raúl Leoni declared that the government would lend all its resources to punish the culprits.

DIGEPOL was replaced in 1969 by the National Directorate of Intelligence and Prevention Services (DISIP), under the control of the Interior Ministry.
