= Juan Crisóstomo Gómez =

Venezuelan politician

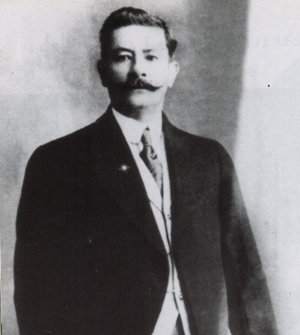
- Juan Crisóstomo Gómez.

First Vice President of Venezuela
- In office June 1922 – 30 June 1923
- President: Juan Vicente Gómez

Personal details
- Born: 1860 Táchira, Venezuela
- Died: 1923 (aged 62–63) Caracas, Venezuela
- Relations: Juan Vicente Gómez (brother)

Juan Crisóstomo Gómez (1860, in La Mulera, Táchira – June 30, 1923, in Caracas) was a Venezuelan politician who served as President of Miranda, Governor of Caracas, and First Vice President of Venezuela until his assassination in 1923. He was the brother of Juan Vicente Gómez, President of Venezuela.

== Political career ==
In 1908, Juan Crisóstomo Gómez was appointed President of Miranda.

In 1915, he was appointed Governor of Caracas. In 1922, he requested that Congress enact a constitutional reform to reinstate the positions of First and Second Vice President. This request was approved, and Juan Vicente Gómez was appointed as president and Juan Crisóstomo Gómez as First Vice President for the 1922–1929 term. It has been alleged that this led to a rivalry with his nephew, José Vicente Gómez Bello, the Second Vice President.

== Assassination ==
On June 30, 1923, Juan Crisóstomo was stabbed to death in his room at the Miraflores Palace. Following the assassination, Francisco Pimentel and Leoncio Martínez were arrested but later released. After numerous investigations into the case conducted by Judge Horacio Chacón and Governor Acelio Hidalgo, Captain Isidro Barrientos was identified as the perpetrator. Judge Horacio Chacón sentenced them to 20 years in La Rotunda prison.
