= List of ambassadors of Venezuela to Spain =

This is a List of ambassadors of Venezuela to Spain.

Name	From	To	Notes
Fermín Toro	1846	1846	
Francisco Michelena y Rojas	1852	1854	
Mauricio Berrizbeitia	1858	1860	
Fermín Toro	1860	1861	
Antonio Guzmán Blanco	1863	1866	President of Venezuela for three separate terms, from 1870–1877, from 1879–1884, and from 1886–1887.
Laureano Zavarce	1868	1868	
Guillermo Tell Villegas	1869	1872	interim President of Venezuela in 1868, 1870 and 1892; Foreign Minister twice.
José María Rojas Espaillat	1873	1876	
Eduardo Calcaño y Panizza	1882	1886	
Carlos Rangel Garbiras	1890	1891	
Marco Antonio Saluzzo	1891	1892	
Tomás Michelena	1893	1893	
Fernando Arvelo	1893	1896	
Juan Pietri	1895	1896	
José Andrade	1896	1899	
Bernabé Planas	1900	1901	
Pedro César Dominici	1910	1911	
José Ignacio Cárdenas	1914	1925	
Esteban Gil Borges	1910	1918	Minister of Foreign Affairs 1919-21 and 1936-41.
José Antonio Martínez Méndez	1920	1921	
Pedro Emilio Coll	1916	1924	
Gumersindo Torres	1927	1929	
Alberto Urbaneja	1929	1932	
Juan Bautista Pérez	1931	1933	President, 1929-31
Emilio Ochoa	1933	1936	
Juan Tinoco	1936	1939	
Caracciolo Parra Pérez	1939	1941	
Alberto Zérega Fombona	1941	1942	
Cristóbal Benítez	1942	1945	
Augusto Mijares	1950	1953	
Simón Becerra	1953	1958	
José Saúl Guerrero Rosales	1958	1962	
Régulo Pacheco Vivas	1962	1964	
Carlos Mendoza Goiticoa	1964	1967	
Eligio Anzola Anzola	1967	1968	
Carlos Capriles Ayala	1969	1972	Journalist and historian
Tomás Polanco Alcántara	1972	1974	Historian
Santiago Ochoa Briceño	1974	1977	
Rubén Carpio Castillo	1977	1978	
Ernesto Santander	1978	1979	
Eduardo Tamayo Gascué	1979	1981	
Rafael León Morales	1979	1979	
Rigoberto Henriquez Vera	1984	1984	
Arturo Hernández Grisanti	1990	1992	
Armando Durán	1992	1994	Minister of Foreign Affairs 1991-2
José Miguel Uzcátegui	1994	1996	
Francisco Paparoni	1996	1998	
Enrique Tejera París	1998	1999	
Raúl Salazar	2000	2002	
Gladys Gutiérrez	2002	2005	
Arévalo Méndez Rivero	2005	2006	
Alfredo Toro Hardy	2007	2009	
Mario Isea	2013	2020	
Coromoto Godoy	2023	2024	
Gladys Gutiérrez	2024	2026	2nd term
