= Juan Bautista Pérez =

President of Venezuela (1929–1931)

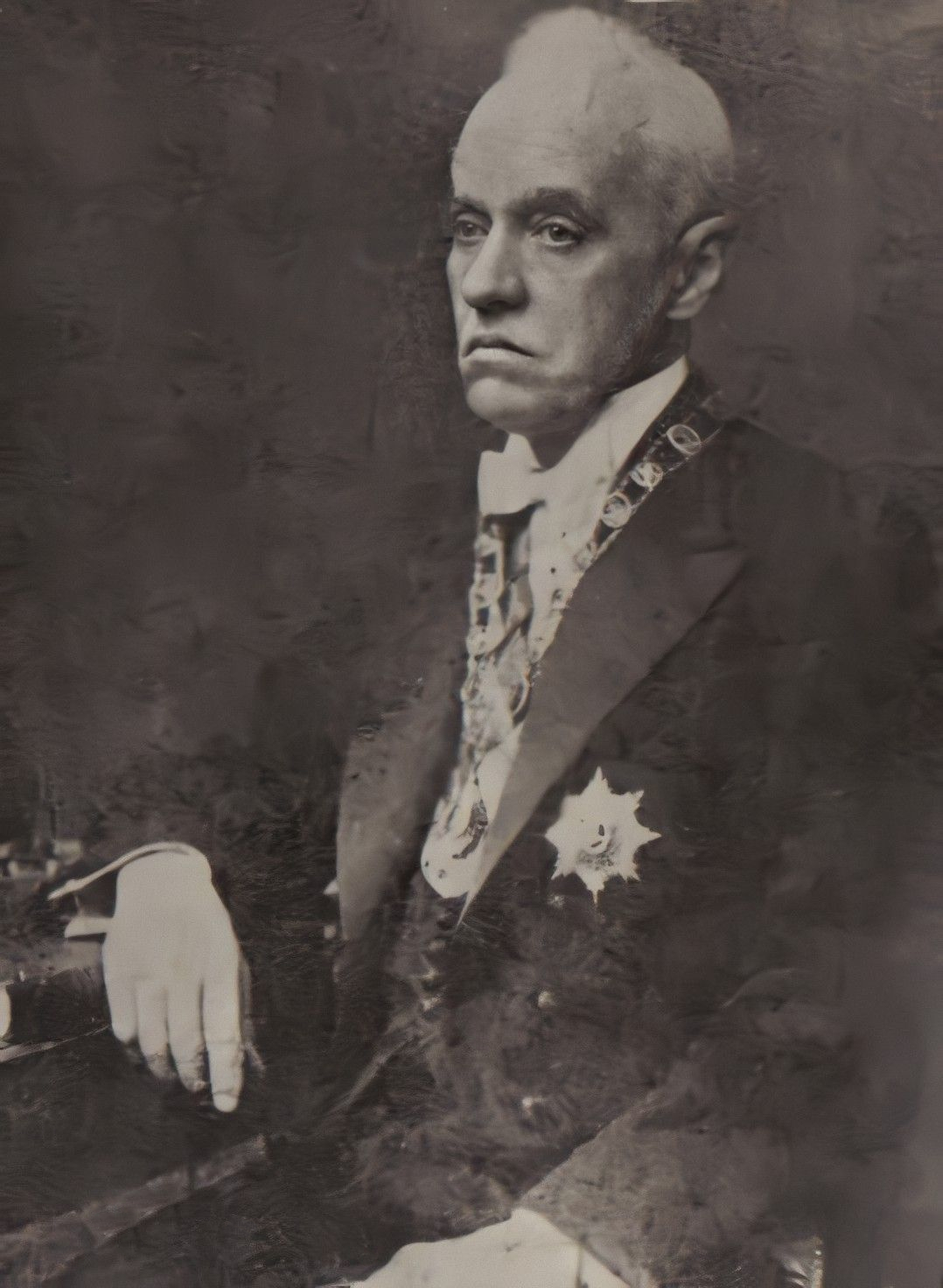

34th President of Venezuela
- In office 30 May 1929 – 13 June 1931
- Preceded by: Juan Vicente Gómez
- Succeeded by: Juan Vicente Gómez

Personal details
- Born: 20 December 1869 Caracas, Venezuela
- Died: 7 May 1952 (aged 82) Caracas, Venezuela
- Education: Central University of Venezuela

Juan Bautista Pérez (20 December 1869 – 7 May 1952), was a Venezuelan lawyer, magistrate, and politician who served as the president of Venezuela between 1929 until 1931. He was a puppet president, as Juan Vicente Gómez was the de facto ruler of Venezuela during Pérez's presidency.

After his presidency, he served as Ambassador to Spain until 1933. His period in office saw several attempts to overthrow Juan Vicente Gómez (who remained the country's ultimate authority) including one by Román Delgado Chalbaud and another by Rafael Simón Urbina, both in 1929.

== Background ==
Graduated as a lawyer at the Central University of Venezuela around 1895, Pérez practiced his profession in Villa de Cura (Edo. Aragua). In 1900, he returned to Caracas, where he entered the magistracy until reaching the Presidency of the Federal Court and Cassation (1929). At the end of his presidential term (1922-1929), General Juan Vicente Gómez had decided to retire to Maracay from where he would maintain control of power as commander in chief of the Army. However, when he was reelected on April 19, 1929 for the period 1929-1936, a delegation of Congress then went to his hacienda El Trompillo to ask Gómez to accept the presidency for another seven-year period. At the insistence of the legislators, Gomez then decided to propose the candidacy of Juan Bautista Perez, in charge of the presidency since April 19 in his capacity as president of the Federal Court.

== Presidency ==
Finally, on May 30, 1929, Pérez became president of the Republic. One of the first measures that Pérez took when he came to power, was to sign an executive decree (11.10.1929), by which the bishop of Valencia, Monsignor Salvador Montes de Oca, was expelled from the country, which caused a public dispute with the Venezuelan ecclesiastical hierarchy and motivated the diplomatic intervention of the Apostolic Nuncio. It was also up to Pérez to cancel in 1930 the entire foreign debt of Venezuela.

In June 1931, still without resolving the problem created with the Church, the National Congress blamed Pérez for the strong depression that was depleting the economy (a reflection of the great world economic crisis that began in 1929) and on that same occasion, on the occasion of the circulation (1.5.1931) of the first manifesto of the newly constituted Communist Party of Venezuela, he was also accused in Parliament of allowing communist ideas into the country. However, both the problem with the church and the accusations made by Congress were partly the product of political maneuvers aimed at replacing the weak figure of Juan Bautista Pérez with a representative of the new Andean generations, among whom were General José María García Velasco. Faced with pressure, Pérez was forced to resign before Congress (13.6.1931), but despite the presidential aspirations of some figures, Gómez was re-elected with greater constitutional powers for the period 1931-1938. Juan Bautista Pérez, for his part, was appointed plenipotentiary minister of Venezuela in Spain and Portugal (1931-1933).

== Aftermath ==
When returned to Venezuela, but in the wake of the events of February 14, 1936, he was expelled along with his family after his house was ransacked. He lived in Barcelona (Spain) until the beginning of the Spanish Civil War (July 1936), when he moved to Paris. In 1939 he returned to the country. His property, confiscated after 18 October 1945, was returned to him in 1949.

== See also ==
- Presidents of Venezuela

Political offices
Preceded by Juan Vicente Gómez	President of Venezuela; 1929–1931	Succeeded by Juan Vicente Gómez
