= Flor María Chalbaud =

First Lady of Venezuela

Flor Chalbaud
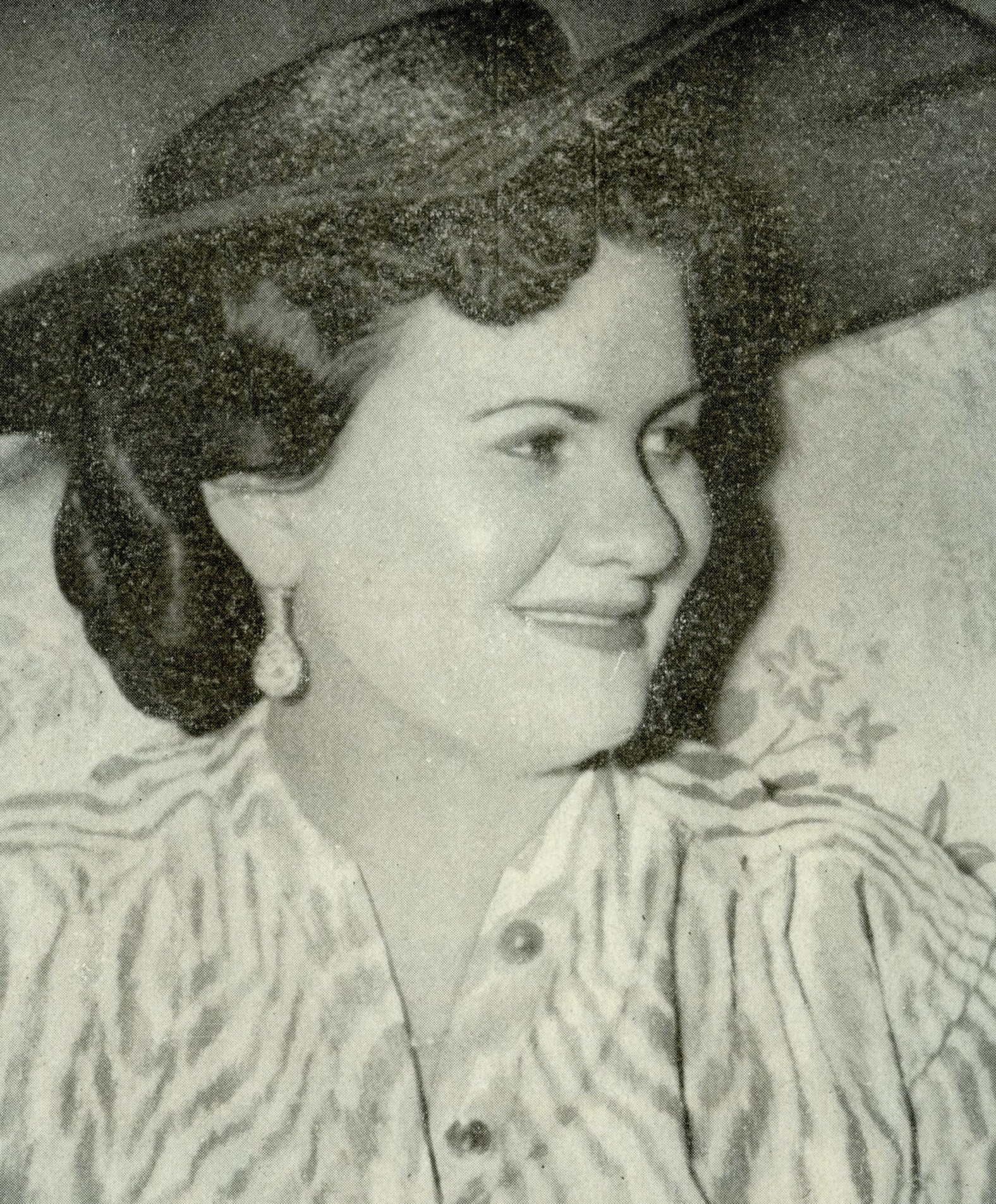
- Flor Chalbaud in 1955

First Lady of Venezuela
- In office 2 December 1952 – 23 January 1958
- President: Marcos Pérez Jiménez
- Preceded by: Rosario Pérez de Suárez
- Succeeded by: Mercedes María de Larrazábal

Personal details
- Born: Flor de María Chalbaud Cardona; July 3, 1921 Caracas, Venezuela
- Died: January 12, 2013 (aged 91)
- Spouse: Marcos Pérez Jiménez (m. 1945)
- Children: Margot Pérez-Jiménez; Florángel Pérez-Jiménez; María Sol Pérez-Jiménez; Flor de María Pérez-Jiménez
- Parent(s): Antonio Chalbaud Cardona; Angelina Castro Tejera

Flor de María Chalbaud Castro (3 July 1921 – 12 January 2013) was First Lady of Venezuela between 2 December 1952 and 23 January 1958 and one of the founders of the Bolivarian Ladies Society.

== Biography ==
On 4 February 1945, Chalbaud married General Marcos Pérez Jiménez, and was First Lady of Venezuela during his presidency between 2 December 1952 and 23 January 1958. She was first cousin of president Lieutenant Colonel Carlos Delgado Chalbaud. During the presidency of Pérez Jiménez, she was best known in the national media for her role at official diplomatic events in which she presided or took part with the formal name "Doña Flor de María Chalbaud-Cardona de Pérez-Jiménez".

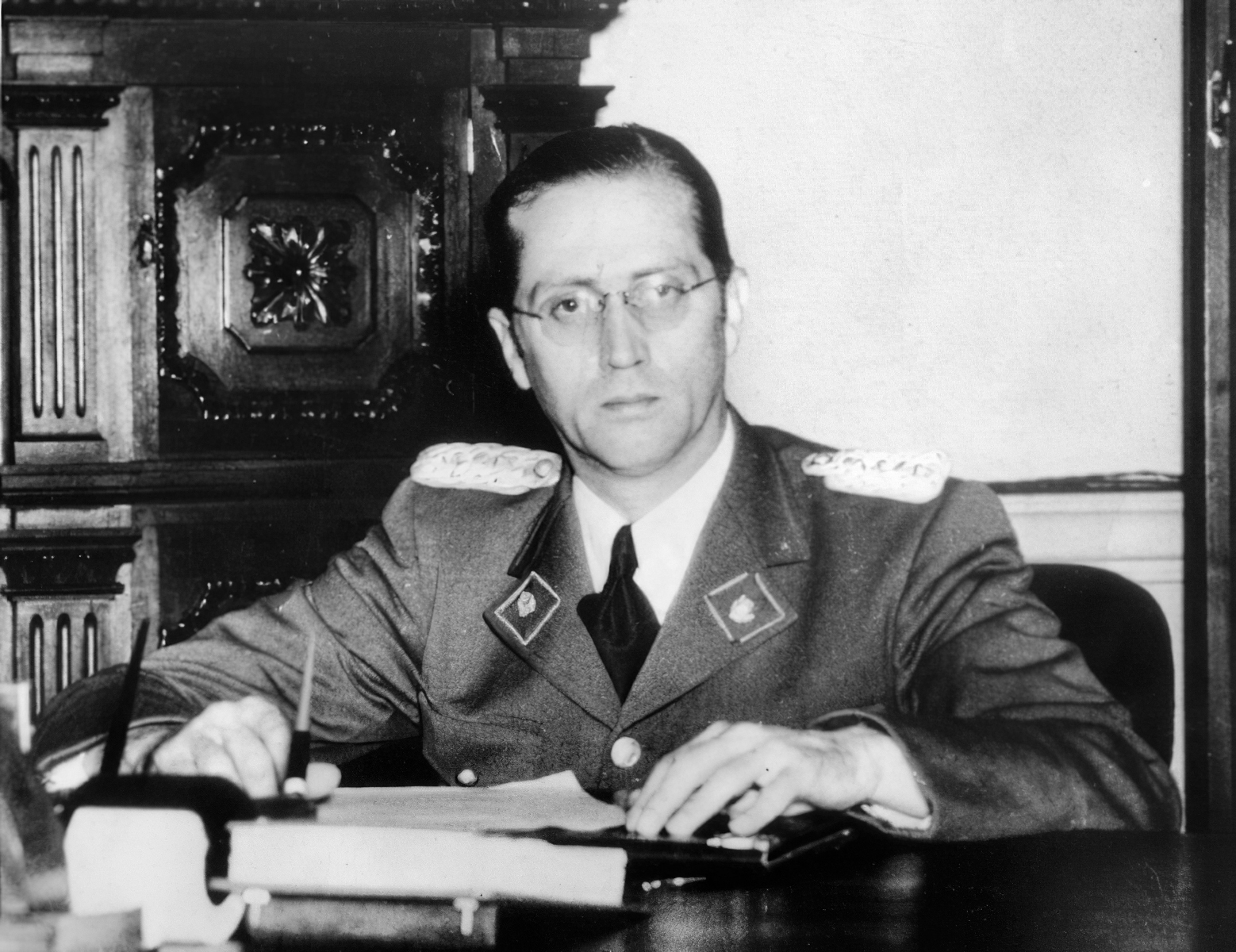
President Lieutenant Colonel Carlos Delgado Chalbaud, president of the Government Military Junta.

Chalbaud took part in the creation of the Bolivarian Ladies Society, which from then on was customarily led by the Venezuelan first lady. The goal of the organization was to "guarantee by all means possible the assistance of Venezuelan mothers and children, and to dedicate itself to other types of social security." Between 1953 and 1954, the organization began endeavors around the country such as kindergartens, schools, playgrounds and maternal centers. It also delivered toys to children on special days, among other activities.

Chalbaud remained with Pérez Jiménez during his trials on embezzlement charges in the 1960s and his years of exile in Spain, until he died in Alcobendas. She died in January 2013 at the age of 91.
