= Rafael Simón Urbina =

Venezuelan rebel

Rafael Simón Urbina López
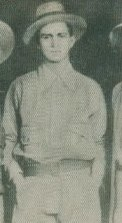
- Rafael Simón Urbina in 1929 (center)
- Born: 1897; Puerto Cumarebo, Venezuela
- Died: 13 November 1950 (aged 52–53); Caracas, Venezuela
- Occupation: Revolutionary

Rafael Simón Urbina López (1897-13 November 1950) was a Venezuelan rebel who fought against the dictatorship of Juan Vicente Gómez.

== Biography ==
=== Early battles ===
Implicated in a 1919 conspiracy to overthrow President Gómez, he spent four years participating in guerrilla warfare from the mountains of his native Falcón State. He went into exile in 1923, in Havana and Barranquilla, before returning in 1925, following an amnesty. A new attempt to overthrow Gómez in 1928 saw Urbina deported to Barranquilla, where he was imprisoned pending extradition, but escaped.

In 1929, he led the taking of Fort Amsterdam in Curaçao and the kidnapping of the Dutch governor, Leonard Albert Fruytier, in another failed attempt to overthrow Gómez involving 250 men with the support of Venezuelan communists, including Gustavo Machado Morales and Miguel Otero Silva. They plundered weapons, ammunition and the treasury of the island and hauled the governor off to Venezuela on the stolen American ship Maracaibo. The revolutionaries landed at La Vela de Coro (Falcón State), but were defeated by Gómez's forces led by General Leon Jurado and the raid ended in failure.

In 1930, exiled in Mexico, Urbina established relations with personalities like General Saturnino Cedillo, General Perez Treviño and General Arturo Bernal, who offered to support his plans for a new invasion of Venezuela. In October 1931, along with 137 Mexican braceros and eight Venezuelans, he landed at Puerto Gutiérrez (Falcón State) and captured the city of Capatárida before being defeated once more by the troops of general Leon Jurado, after which he fled the country again.

=== Return to Venezuela and kidnappings ===
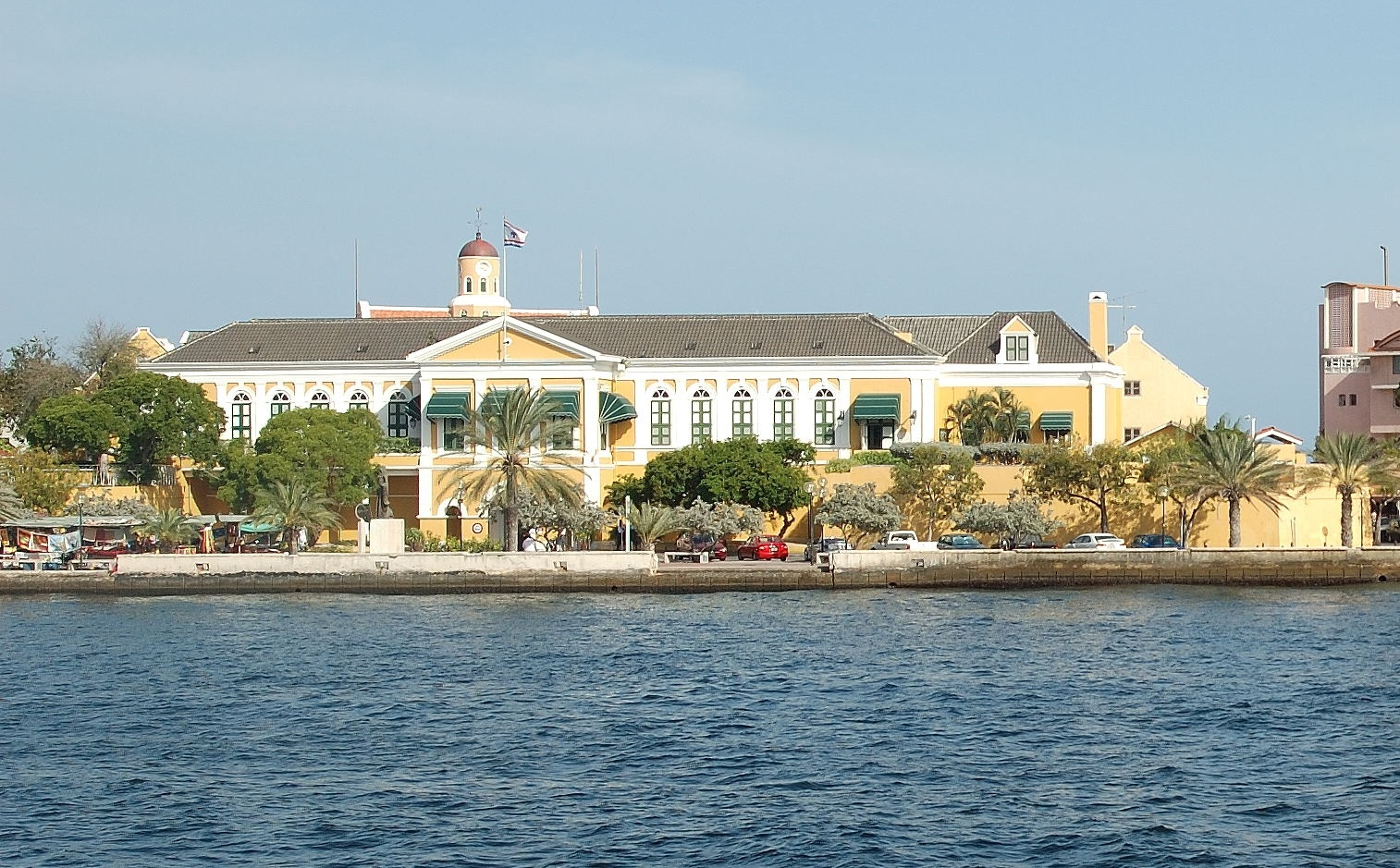
Fort Amsterdam

Urbina returned to Venezuela in 1936, offering his services to Eleazar López Contreras, including the denunciation of communists such as his former associate Machado. He opposed the 1945 Venezuelan coup d'état and after seeking asylum in the Haitian embassy, went into exile in Barranquilla and Santo Domingo, where he sought the help of Dominican Republic dictator Rafael Leonidas Trujillo in planning another invasion of Venezuela. He returned to Venezuela following the 1948 Venezuelan coup d'état and unsuccessfully requested the return of his assets, which had been confiscated in 1945. On 13 November 1950, he was involved in the failed kidnapping of Venezuelan President Carlos Delgado Chalbaud, which resulted in the death of Delgado and the accidental of Urbina's leg shooting in that failed event from which he fled seeking exile in Nicaragua. The Venezuelan government was informed of this and forced the Nicaraguan embassy to hand over Urbina for the murder of Delgado and was murdered that night during a transfer from one prison to another. Subsequently, Marcos Pérez Jiménez rose as ruler of Venezuela.

== See also ==
- Politics of Venezuela
