= Román Delgado Chalbaud =

Román Delgado Chalbaud (Mérida, 12 April 1882 - Cumana, 11 August 1929) was a Venezuelan naval officer, founder, admiral, and commander in chief of the Venezuelan navy, businessman and politician. Hero of the battle of "Ciudad Bolívar", which sealed the pacification of Venezuela in 1903. Later, as head of a failed conspiracy against Juan Vicente Gómez he was imprisoned for 14 years in 1913, before attempting a naval invasion in 1929 to overthrow Gómez's regime and his Presidential front man.

== Background and personal life ==
He was born to General Miguel Delgado Briceño (son of Santos Román Delgado Abreu and Abigail Briceño Gabaldón, whose grandparent was an Andalusian colonist) and Dolores Chalbaud Calderón (the daughter of José Antonio Chalbaud, a French immigrant, and Dolores Calderón Carrillo). He was the father of Carlos Delgado Chalbaud (born 1909).

== Career ==
Delgado entered the Venezuelan Naval Academy at Puerto Cabello, and by 1901 had obtained the rank of captain. He was Commander in Chief of the Venezuelan Navy during the Revolución Libertadora led by Manuel Antonio Matos against the government of Cipriano Castro. In 1906-7 he was involved with a group called "La Conjura" opposed to Juan Vicente Gómez, but nonetheless supported Gómez' 1908 coup against Castro.

The following year Delgado founded the Compañía Anónima de Navegación Fluvial y Costanera, which controlled the entire maritime and river transport of Venezuela, with Gómez holding some shares. Delgado became sufficiently identified with gomecismo to be considered a possible successor to Gómez. In 1911 Delgado visited Europe to try to obtain financial support for a variety of development schemes in Venezuela. With some sectors of public opinion opposing the deals, Gómez, who had appeared to support them, opposed them. In 1913 he initiated a conspiracy against Gómez. This failed, and he was imprisoned for 14 years.

== 1929 Falke invasion ==
Following his release, Delgado moved to Paris, a center of Venezuelan exile organisation against Gómez, and helped organise a government-in-exile, the Junta de Liberación Nacional, of which Santos Dominici was president and Alberto Smith Vice President. On the morning of 11 August 1929 Delgado led the steamship Falke (renamed General Anzoátegui for the occasion) into Cumaná. Met by Venezuelan armed forces, the expeditionary force of 250-300 men soon ran into problems. Delgado was killed on the first day, and on 24 August, the leaders of the expedition surrendered. Delgado died at Cumaná, but his son Carlos was able to escape. Other participants included the writer José Rafael Pocaterra and Francisco Linares Alcantara. Venezuela's roving diplomat in Europe, José Ignacio Cárdenas, had reported on the planned expedition, which helped defeat it.

== Books ==
- Delgado Chalbaud, Roman (1912), Por mi jefe, por mi causa, y por mi nombre, Emp. El Cojo
- Capriles Méndez, Ruth (1991), Los negocios de Román Delgado Chalbaud, Academia Nacional de la Historia

== See also ==
- Political prisoners in Venezuela
