= Arístides Bastidas =

Venezuelan journalist (1924–1992)

- Born: 12 March 1924; San Pablo, Yaracuy, Venezuela
- Died: 23 September 1992 (aged 68); Caracas
- Occupation: Journalist

Arístides Bastidas (12 March 1924 – 23 September 1992) was a Venezuelan journalist, educator and scientist. He was one of the pioneers of what is termed "science journalism" in Venezuela.

== Biography ==
Bastidas was born in San Pablo in Yaracuy state, son of Nemesio Bastidas and Castorila Gámez. He moved to Caracas with his family in 1936, settling in a modest neighborhood in the south of the capital. He studied there but did not complete studies because the family economic pressure forced him to perform various jobs until 1945, when started in print journalism. He sympathised with the resistance against the regime of Marcos Pérez Jiménez (1948–1958). A self-taught scientist, from 1968 to 1981 he directed the science page of the Sunday newspaper "El Nacional" where from 1971 until his death he wrote the daily column La Ciencia Amena. He considered the popularization of science as a tool to achieve technological self-determination and culture of countries. He co-founded the Iberoamerican Association of Science Journalists (Asociación Iberoamericana de Periodismo Científico de Venezuela) in Venezuela in 1974 (or 1969 as some sources indicate).

He died in Caracas, Venezuela's capital, on 23 September 1992. The Aristides Bastidas Municipality with Bastidas's home town of San Pablo as the capital was created by the Venezuelan government soon after his death in 1993 to commemorate him. The Unidad Educativa Colegio Arístides Bastidas was also named after him.

== Awards ==
For his contribution to the development of science journalism, he received recognition from the governments of Venezuela and Spain, and the United Nations Educational, Scientific and Cultural Organization (UNESCO), which awarded him the Kalinga Prize (1980).

== Publications ==
Bastidas produced more than twenty books, among which include "El anhelo constante", "Biografía de Rafael Vegas", "La Ciencia Amena", "Aliados silenciosos del progreso", "El átomo y sus intimidades", Científicos del mundo, "Ciencia y tecnología, dos bienes sociales" and "La Tierra, morada de la vida y el hombre".
