= La Conjura =

La Conjura was a political plot that occurred in 1906–1907 against the vice president of Venezuela, Juan Vicente Gómez, during the dictatorship of Cipriano Castro. This plot took place when President Castro fell ill, opening up the possibility of succession. It was carried out by ministers Ramón Tello Mendoza, José Rafael Revenga, Julio Torres Cárdenas, Eduardo Celis, and General Francisco Linares Alcántara Estévez, the president of Aragua, who was their favored candidate to succeed Castro.

Cipriano Castro sought to prevent Gómez from becoming president. Gómez had to sleep in different houses during this time, his life under threat. This event led to an internal political crisis within the government and concluded when the dictator and Gómez reconciled after the president's health improved, and Castro realized that his trusted group had already considered him dead.

== See also ==
- Dictatorship of Cipriano Castro
