= San Pablo, Yaracuy =

San Pablo
- Town
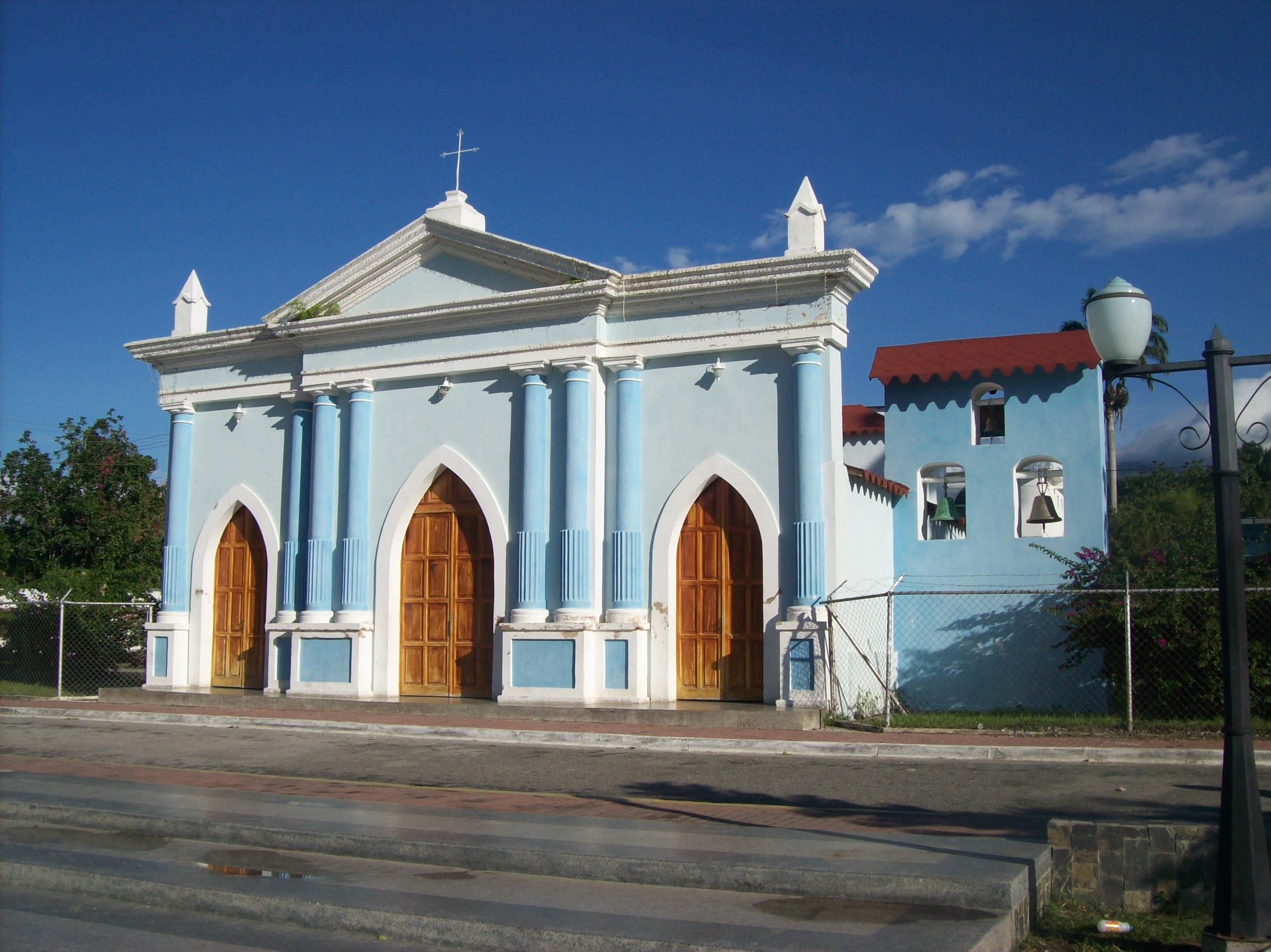
- Church of San Pablo

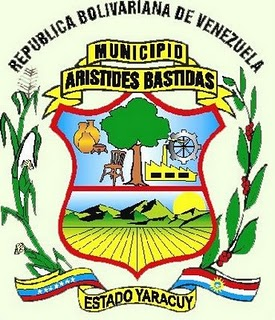
- Coat of arms

- Location in Venezuela
- Coordinates: 10°14′51″N 68°50′42″W
- Country: Venezuela
- State: Yaracuy
- Municipality: Arístides Bastidas

Government
  - Mayor: Anibal Centeno (PSUV)
- Elevation: 344 m (1,129 ft)

Population (2011)
  - Total: 19,459
- Time zone: UTC−4 (VET)
- Postal code(s): 3201

San Pablo is a town and the seat of the Arístides Bastidas Municipality in the state of Yaracuy, Venezuela.
