= Arístides Bastidas Municipality =

Arístides Bastidas Municipality Municipio Arístides Bastidas
- Municipality
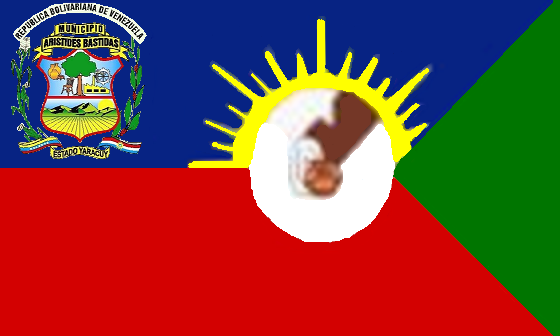
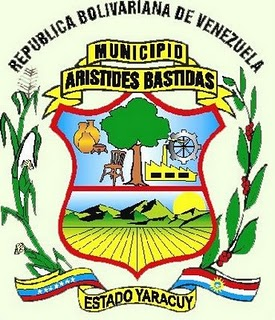
- Flag Coat of arms

- Location in Yaracuy

- Location in Venezuela
- Coordinates: 10.2358°N 68.8475°W
- Country: Venezuela
- State: Yaracuy
- Municipal seat: San Pablo

Area
  - Total: 75.6 km^{2} (29.2 sq mi)

Population (2011)
  - Total: 21,546
  - Density: 285/km^{2} (738/sq mi)
- Time zone: UTC−4 (VET)

Arístides Bastidas is one of the 14 municipalities of the state of Yaracuy, Venezuela. The municipality is located in northern Yaracuy, occupying an area of 74 km² with a population of 21,546 inhabitants as of the 2011 census. The municipal seat is in San Pablo. The municipality was established in 1993 in honour of Venezuelan journalist and scientist Arístides Bastidas, born locally in San Pablo.

== Name ==
Arístides Bastidas Municipality was established in 1993 in honour of Venezuelan journalist and scientist Arístides Bastidas who was born locally in San Pablo.

== Demographics ==
Based on the 2011 Venezuelan census, The population of the Arístides Bastidas Municipality was 21,546 people, accounting for 3.36% of the total population of the state of Yaracuy. An overwhelming majority of the population (95%) resides in San Pablo, the municipal seat of the municipality.

By June 2019, official projections from the Venezuelan Statistics National Institute estimated the population of Arístides Bastidas as 25,103 people, representing an annual growth rate of 1.9% since 2011 and showing a population density of 339.2 inhabitants/km². However, these projections do not account for the impact of emigration linked to the country's recent economic and political circumstances.

The gender distribution of the population showed an even balance with 10,303 men (50.3%) and 10,182 women (49.7%). The age distribution showed that the largest segment of the population was aged 15 to 64, comprising 64.1% of the people. Younger people aged 0 to 14 made up 30.4% of the population, while those aged 65 and older accounted for the remaining 5.5%. The municipality is very highly urbanised, with 95% of the inhabitants (19,459) living in urban centers compared to only 5% (1,026) in rural areas.

Ethnically, the municipality identified as predominantly Mestizo (61.7%) and White people (32.9%). Minority groups included 5% Afro-Venezuelans and 0.3% belonging to other ethnic groups, with 9 individuals identifying as indigenous. The literacy rate was 93%, with 1,151 inhabitants of Arístides Bastidas not able to read or write.
