= Trial of Marcos Pérez Jiménez =

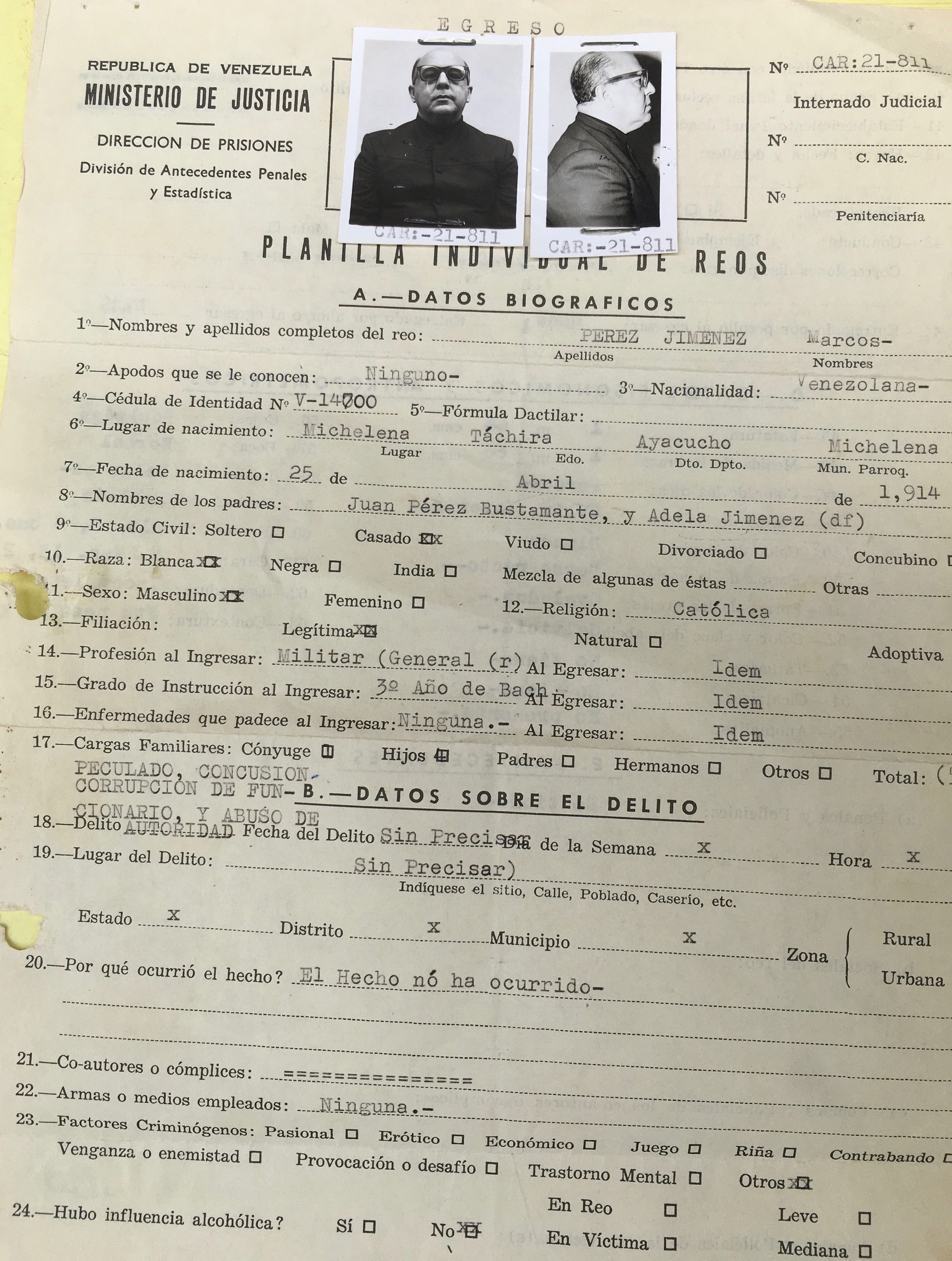
Individual inmate record of Marcos Pérez Jiménez

The trial of Marcos Pérez Jiménez by the Supreme Court of Justice took place in Venezuela between 1963 and 1968.

After an extradition order from the Venezuelan government requested dictator Pérez Jiménez in the United States, he was arrested there, then extradited and tried in Venezuela for embezzlement and misappropriation of funds, being sentenced to more than four years in prison.

The sentence was issued in 1968, and Pérez Jiménez having served that sentence, he was released. It was the first time in history that a president of Venezuela was tried and sentenced to prison.

== History ==
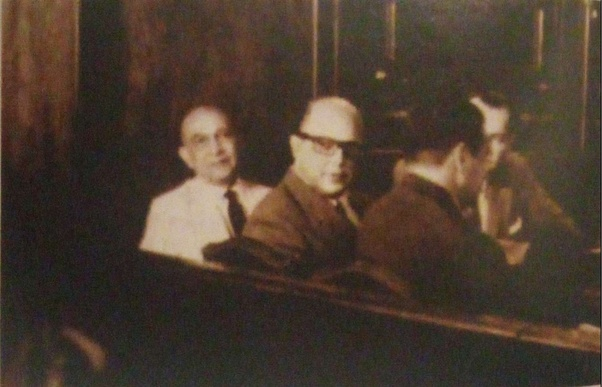
Marcos Pérez Jiménez in the defendants' dock at the Supreme Court of Justice of Venezuela. In the background, facing forward, his lawyer Rafael Naranjo Ostty

Dictator Marcos Pérez Jiménez had fled to the Dominican Republic due to the 1958 Venezuelan coup d'état and then to Miami. The Supreme Court of Justice of Venezuela accused him of theft from the public treasury and convicted him.

Documents found in the luggage that Marcos Pérez Jiménez left at his house served as evidence of the illegal increase of his fortune, with which his extradition was achieved; the United States received the extradition request for Pérez Jiménez on August 21, 1959, and he was arrested on the 25th for eight months. On August 16, 1963, the Venezuelan government presided over by Rómulo Betancourt, in agreement with the U.S. government, obtained the extradition of Pérez Jiménez. On August 17, he was extradited to Venezuela.

Pérez Jiménez was confined to the Cárcel Modelo in Caracas while the trial was taking place. During the trial, it was proven that he received $148,960 in commissions from a British company (1951); $58,951 in two contracts signed by the Ministry of Defense with a Swedish company (1952); $258,774 from an Italian company for a purchase of tanks; it was proven that for contracts for the acquisition of war equipment he received $1,421,800 (1954); and $785,000 from an Italian company. The Comptroller's Office of Venezuela determined that there was an "excess of initial net assets and legitimate remuneration" of more than 13 million dollars at that time.

Pérez was sentenced to four years in prison for embezzlement and misappropriation of funds, so he was released immediately, as he had spent five years in prison awaiting the sentence. The former president went to Spain for the rest of his life.
