= La Mulera =

- Location within Venezuela
- Coordinates: 7°48′43″N 72°21′55″W
- Country: Venezuela
- State: Táchira
- Municipality: Bolívar Municipality
- Established: July 24, 1857
- Time zone: UTC−4 (VET)

La Mulera is located in Juan Vicente Gómez Parish, in the municipality of Bolívar, of the state of Táchira, in Venezuela.

It is the birthplace of Juan Vicente Gómez.
