= Dirección de Seguridad Nacional =

Venezuelan secret police (1938–1958)

Directory of National Security Dirección de Seguridad Nacional
- Abbreviation: DSN

Agency overview
- Formed: 1938; 88 years ago
- Dissolved: 23 January 1958; 68 years ago
- Superseding agency: DIGEPOL

Jurisdictional structure
- Operations jurisdiction: Venezuela
- General nature: Secret police

The Directory of National Security (Spanish: Dirección de Seguridad Nacional, abbreviated as DSN) was the secret police of Venezuela from 1938 until is disestablishment in 1958.

== History ==
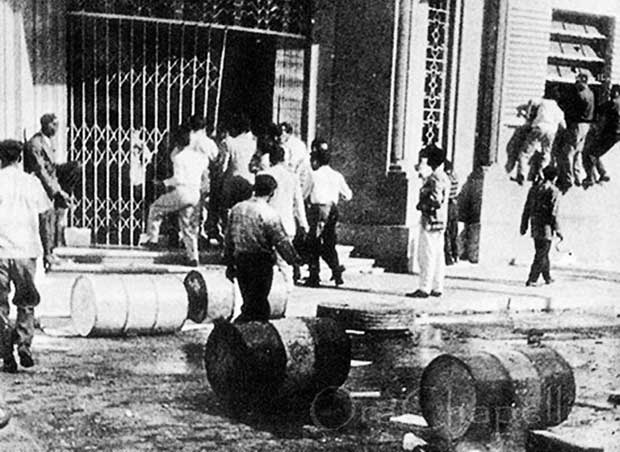
Protesters raiding a National Security Directorate building on 23 January 1958.

The Directory of National Security was established in 1938 in Venezuela. The Seguridad Nacional was active during the presidencies of Eleazar López Contreras, Isaías Medina Angarita, Rómulo Betancourt, Rómulo Gallegos, Carlos Delgado Chalbaud, Germán Suárez Flamerich, and most notably, Marcos Pérez Jiménez. The purpose of the Seguridad Nacional was to investigate, arrest, torture, or assassinate political opponents to the Venezuelan government. From 1951 until 1953, the Seguridad Nacional operated a prison camp on Guasina Island, a forced labour camp.

The Seguridad Nacional was abolished following the overthrow of Pérez Jiménez on 23 January 1958. Outraged citizens raided the DSN headquarters after Pérez Jiménez's removal, with some mobs killing DSN members throughout Venezuela and releasing prisoners from their custody.

== See also ==
- Bolivarian Intelligence Service
- List of historical secret police organizations
