= Juan Vicente Gómez =

Dictator of Venezuela from 1908 to 1935

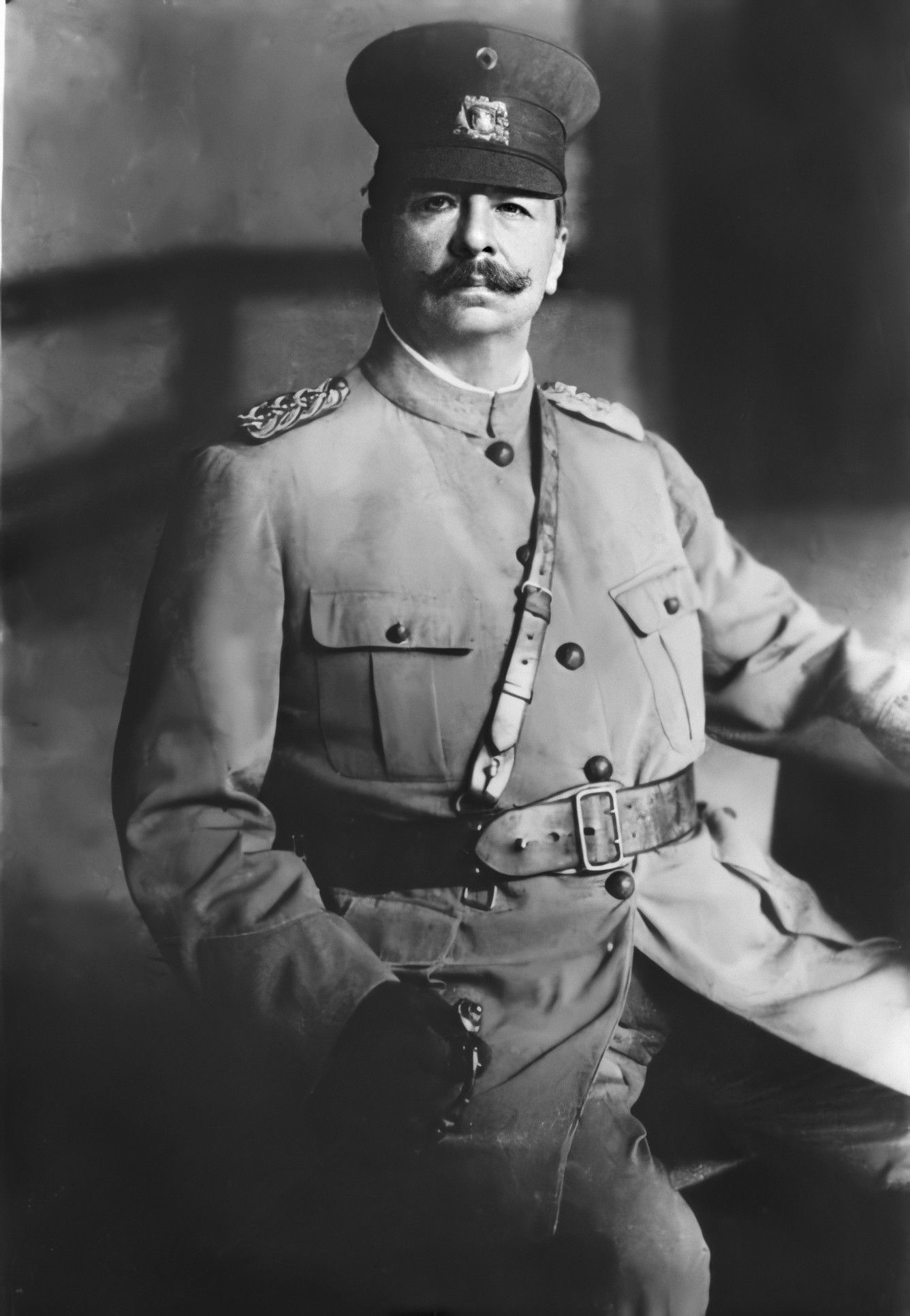
- Gómez in 1928

31st, 33rd & 35th President of Venezuela
- In office 19 December 1908 – 13 August 1913
- Vice President: Juan Pietri Pietri
- Preceded by: Cipriano Castro
- Succeeded by: José Gil Fortoul (acting)
- In office 24 June 1922 – 30 May 1929
- Vice President: Juan Crisóstomo Gómez; José Vicente Gómez Bello
- Preceded by: Victorino Márquez Bustillos
- Succeeded by: Juan Bautista Pérez
- In office 13 June 1931 – 17 December 1935
- Preceded by: Juan Bautista Pérez
- Succeeded by: Eleazar López Contreras

Personal details
- Born: 24 July 1857 Hacienda La Mulera, Táchira, Venezuela
- Died: 17 December 1935 (aged 78) Maracay, Aragua, Venezuela
- Relations: Juan Crisóstomo Gómez (brother); Eustaquio Gómez (cousin)
- Children: List: José Vicente; Josefa; Alí; Flor de María; Graciela; Servilia; Gonzalo; Juan Vicente; Florencio; Rosa Amelia; Hermenegilda; Cristina; Belén; Berta; Manuel Antonio; Juan Crisóstomo Gómez
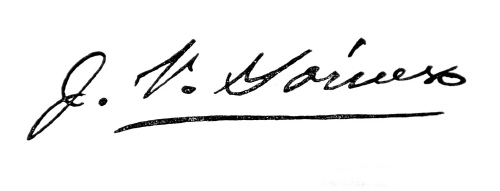
- Signature

Juan Vicente Gómez Chacón (24 July 1857 – 17 December 1935) was a Venezuelan military general, politician and de facto ruler of Venezuela from 1908 until his death in 1935. He only officially served as president on three occasions during this time, ruling as an unelected military strongman behind puppet governments in between.

Important public works were carried out during his dictatorship as the famous Transandean Highway a route of 1,539 km that starts from Las Adjuntas station (near Caracas Metro Station) and ends at the main land customs office in San Antonio del Táchira. This development came at the expense of civil liberties. He founded the country's first airline, Aeropostal Alas de Venezuela and the Venezuelan Air Force. He commissioned the construction of Venezuela's first airports: Maracaibo International Airport "Grano de Oro", La Fría, Encontrados, Sucre Base (now Florencio Gomez National Airport in Maracay, Aragua), Aragua Meteorological Air Base (the cradle and birthplace of the airport). Venezuelan Aviation, later converted into Aviation Museum, Porlamar (now Municipal Police Headquarters, replaced by Santiago Mariño Caribbean International Airport), Leonardo Chirinos International Airport in Coro, Juan Vicente Gómez International Airport and Mérida's Alberto Carnevalli Airport.

Likewise, bridges, customs buildings (such as the main customs office in San Antonio del Táchira), the first passenger terminal of the intercity bus line were built, the first intercity bus line was called the Venezuelan Airbus or the Venezuelan Airmail Bus. The Venezuelan military was organized on a modern basis.

His dictatorship always tried to maintain a constitutional and democratic façade, employing short-term puppet presidents like Victorino Márquez Bustillos and Juan Bautista Pérez and allowing them to rule directly or indirectly through successive constitutional amendments.

== Early years ==
Gómez was born into a prominent family of Andean landowners who lived in the La Mulera. He was the firstborn son of Pedro Cornelio Gomez and Hermenegilda Chacon Alarcon. In 1899, he joined the private army of Cipriano Castro, with whom he had been friends since Castro's exile in Colombia. This army swept down on Caracas in 1899 and seized control of the country. He became Castro's second vice president in 1901, his first vice president in 1904, and, in 1902, head of the military, responsible for suppressing several major revolts against the government in the battle of Ciudad Bolivar on 21 July 1903. Gómez seized power from Castro in a coup d'état on 19 December 1908, while Castro was in Europe for medical treatment. Their relationship had been rocky for some time, as shown by the La Conjura incident.

== Presidency ==
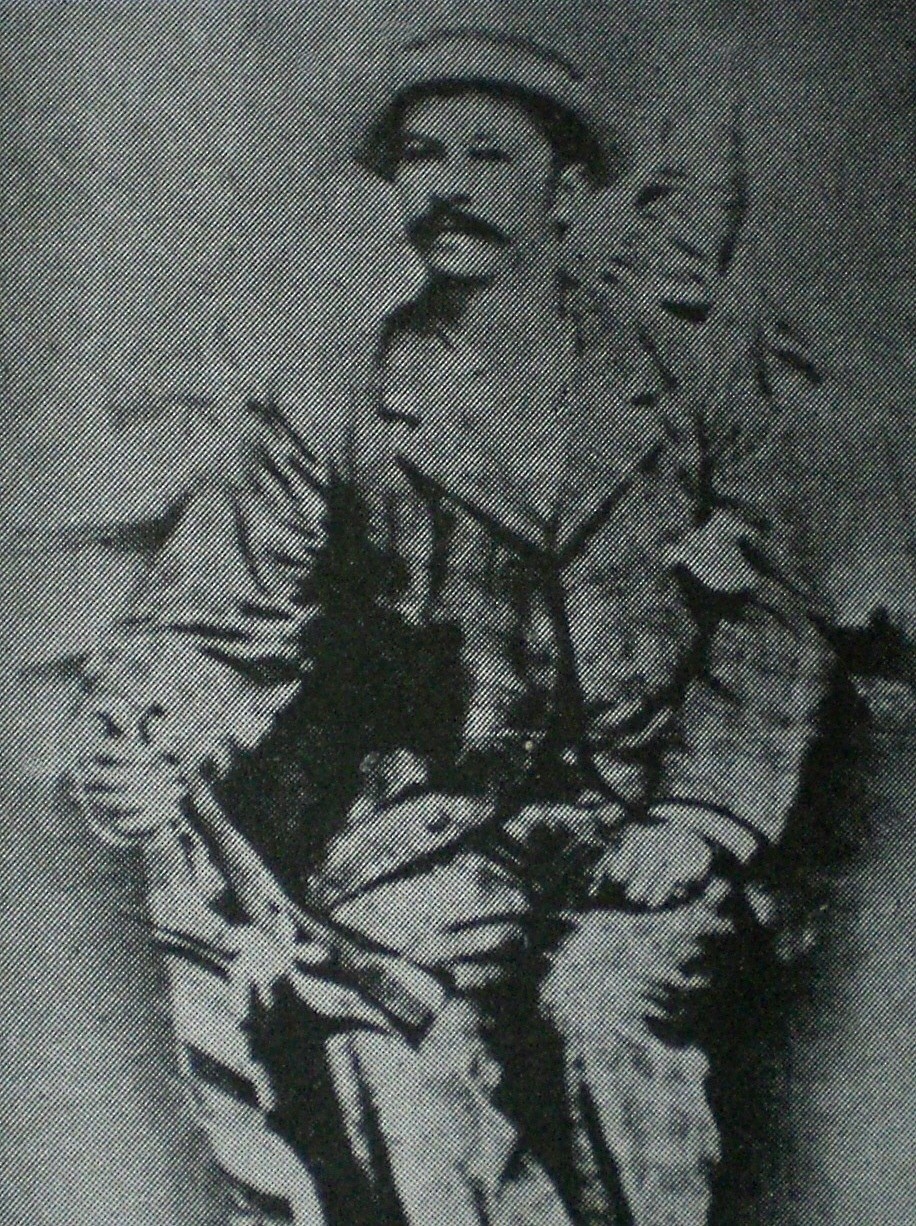
Gómez in 1899

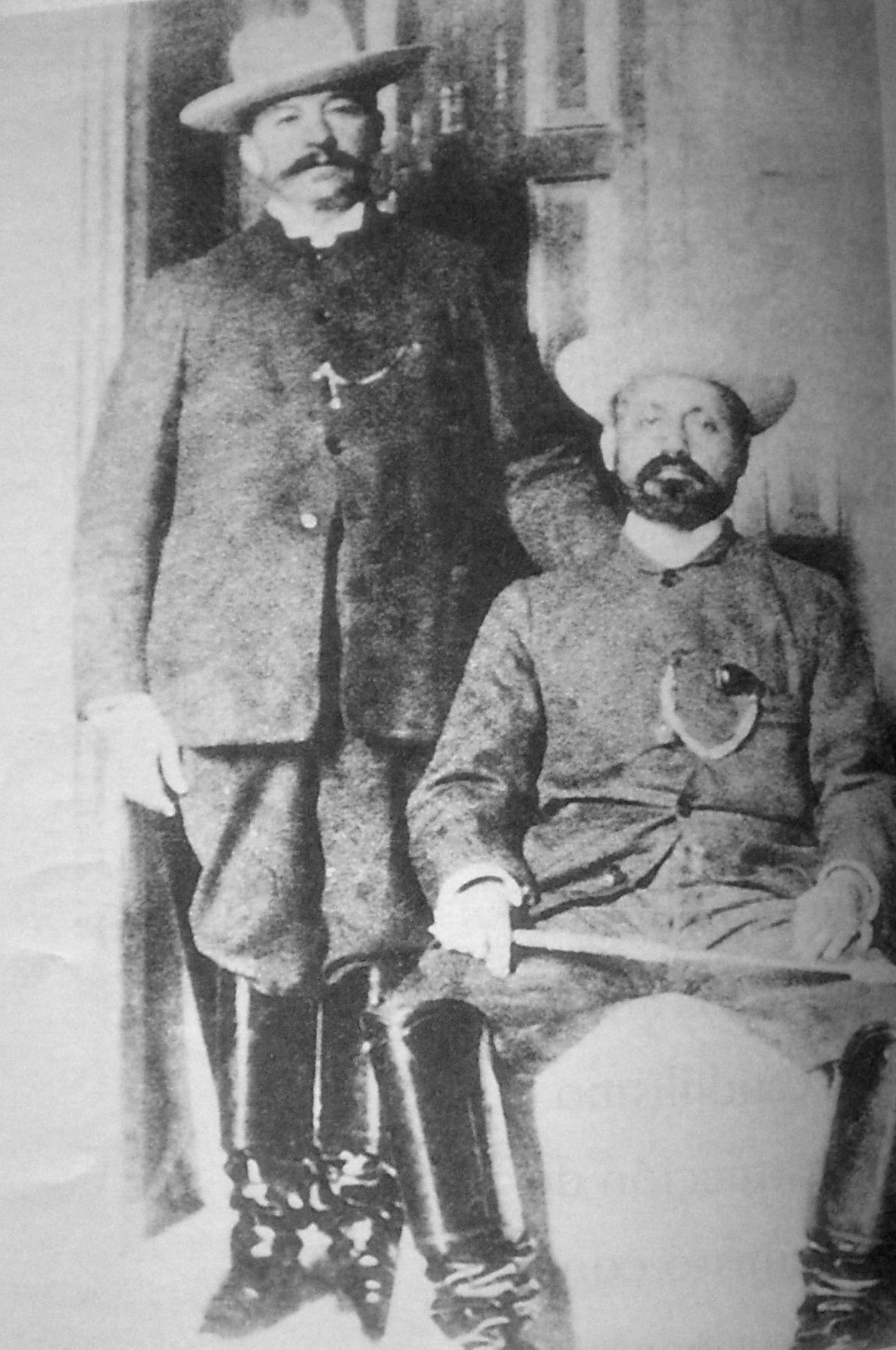
Gómez and Cipriano Castro

As president, Gómez managed to deflate Venezuela's staggering debt by granting concessions to foreign oil companies after the discovery of petroleum in Lake Maracaibo in 1914. This, in turn, won him the support of the United States and Europe and economic stability. Though he used the money to launch an extensive public works program, he also received generous kickbacks, increasing his personal fortune enormously. Because of his contributions to the country's development, the Congress bestowed the title of El Benemérito ("the Meritorious One") on him. In contrast, his opponents, who disdained his brutal tactics at home, referred to him as El Bagre ("the Catfish"), a snide reference to his bushy mustache and outward appearance. They also called him "the Tyrant of the Andes" – a reference to his roots in the mountain state of Táchira.

Gómez spent the last year of his term on a military campaign, and José Gil Fortoul served as de facto acting president. Gómez was reelected in 1914, but declined to take office, and Victorino Márquez was elected provisional president in his stead. It was generally understood, however, that Gómez continued to hold the real power; he ruled the country from his home in Maracay. He returned to office in 1922, ruling until 22 April 1929. Though he was reelected by Congress, he declined to return to the capital, and Juan Bautista Pérez assumed the presidency, though Gómez remained the final authority in the country. On 13 June 1931, Congress forced Pérez to resign, and elected Gómez president again. This time, he resumed office, ruling the country until his death.

== Opposition ==
The Generation of 1928 was a group of students who led protests in 1928 against Gómez in the capital city of Caracas. Members included Rómulo Betancourt, Jóvito Villalba, Joaquin Gabaldon Marquez, Juan Oropeza, Raúl Leoni, Andrés Eloy Blanco, Miguel Otero Silva, Pedro Sotillo, Isaac J Pardo, Juan Bautista Fuenmayor, Germán Suárez Flamerich and Gustavo Machado.

== Personal life ==
Gómez was never married; however, he had two mistresses. The first one was Dionisia Gómez Bello, with whom he had seven children: José Vicente, Josefa, Alí, Flor de María, Graciela, Servilia, and Gonzalo. The second one was Dolores Amelia Nunez Linares' de Cáceres, with whom he had nine children: Juan Vicente, Florencio, Rosa Amelia, Hermenegilda, Cristina, Belén, Berta, Manuel Antonio and Juan Crisóstomo Gómez. Gómez also fathered many other children in brief relationships: at least 64 and possibly as many as 99. He appointed many of his children to public office, sparking charges of nepotism.

Gómez did not drink or smoke.

== Legacy ==
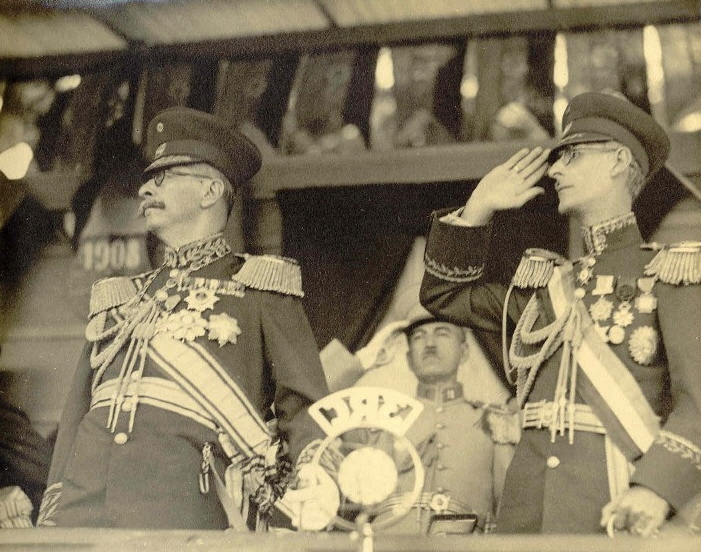
Gómez and Eleazar López Contreras in 1934

Gómez's rule of Venezuela is a controversial period in the country's history. Under his presidency, there was discovery of large oil fields in Venezuela. These oil fields would primarily be developed during his successors' tenure. His insistence on road construction and the creation of jobs in the then-new oil industry promoted population mobility and more frequent social contact among Venezuelans of different regions – previously a rare occurrence – which permanently rooted a sense of national unity in the country. He brought about the end of civil wars and political insurrections by exerting power over regional caudillos to strengthen his own power, and as a result, Venezuela became a peaceful country for several decades. Ironically, the elimination of the caudillo problem and the choosing of Eleazar López Contreras as his last minister of war and marine paved the way to the emergence of modern democracy; see Generation of 1928. He repaid all foreign and internal debt using excess reserves; his fiscal conservatism helped the country get through the Crash of 1929 and the Great Depression, and led to an increase in the value of the bolívar to the point of becoming hard currency.

On the other hand, he is considered by some as one of the prominent examples of U.S. economic domination over Latin America. During his reign, most of the country's wealth ended up in the hands of Gómez and his cronies, and, according to Woddis, Wall Street. Indeed, at the time of his death, he was by far the richest man in the country. While he brought more peace and prosperity than most living Venezuelans had known, it came at the expense of democracy. He held basic civil liberties in disdain, and his secret police were ubiquitous. He also did little for public education (believing that "an ignorant people is a docile people"). Although cordial and simple in manner and speech, his ruthless crushing of opponents through his secret police earned him the reputation of a tyrant. He was also accused of trying to make the country his personal fiefdom.

Under Gómez, Venezuela completed a degree of independence and financial progress. After oil reserves were determined to exist near Lake Maracaibo in 1914, Gómez bargained shrewdly with the petroleum corporations of the United States, United Kingdom, and the Netherlands for the gain of Venezuela. He persevered to preserve precise family members with overseas countries and controlled to cast off all overseas indebtedness. He exercised control over the neighborhood caudillos ("bosses") and the Roman Catholic Church, launched many public works programs, and prepared a 'green' administration. A staunch anticommunist, Gómez viewed both communism and trade unions as a threat to regime and suppressed both, denouncing the former as a "plague" and the latter as "a tool of the devil."

Gómez was brutally repressive. Time magazine wrote that Gomez "always remained the iron-fisted boss who put down every attempt at revolution more ruthlessly than Germany’s famed blood purge of 1934. The secret police of Germany, Russia and Italy are notable organizations. They fade into insignificance before those of Dictator Gomez. For every policeman in Caracas Dictator Gomez kept twelve spies, male & female, on his payroll." John Gunther described Gómez as follows: "The Catfish was—let us not gloss over the fact—a murderous blackguard. He made use of tortures of inconceivable brutality; political prisoners, of which there were thousands, dragged out their lives bearing leg irons (grillos) that made them permanent cripples, if they were not hung upside down—by the testicles—until they died. Others became human slime, literally. Gómez was quite capable of choosing one out of every ten by lot, and hanging them—by meathooks through their throats!"

Former Venezuelan President Rómulo Betancourt said in his book Venezuela: Oil and Politics that "(...) Gomez was something more than a local despot, he was the instrument of foreign control of the Venezuelan economy, the ally and servant of powerful outside interests." This is in reference to Royal Dutch Shell and Standard Oil's agreement with the dictator for exploration rights to the country's oil fields.

In Venezuelan politics, Juan Vicente Gómez has come to symbolize political endurance and a right-wing caudillo mentality together with Marcos Pérez Jiménez. Gómez was quoted as saying he needed a lifetime to fulfill his political work.

Juan Vicente Gómez International Airport was named for him in 1993.

== Distinctions and decorations ==
- There is a statue of Juan Vicente in Aeronautics Museum of Maracay.
- The Venezuelan airport of Juan Vicente Gómez International Airport has the name of Gómez, and it was declared as such in 1993.

=== National decorations ===
- Order of the Liberator (1908–1913/1922–1929/1931–1935).
- Order of Francisco de Miranda (1908–1913/1922–1929/1931–1935).

=== International decorations ===
- Order of Boyacá
- Order of Pope Pius IX
- Order of Leopold (Belgium)
- Order of Charles III

== See also ==
- Presidents of Venezuela
- Dictatorship of Juan Vicente Gómez

Political offices
Preceded by Cipriano Castro	President of Venezuela (1st Term); 1908–1913	Succeeded by José Gil Fortoul
Preceded by Victorino Márquez Bustillos	President of Venezuela (2nd Term); 1922–1929	Succeeded by Juan Bautista Pérez
Preceded by Juan Bautista Pérez	President of Venezuela (3rd Term); 1931–1935	Succeeded by Eleazar López Contreras
