= Carlos Delgado Chalbaud =

President of Venezuela from 1948 to 1950

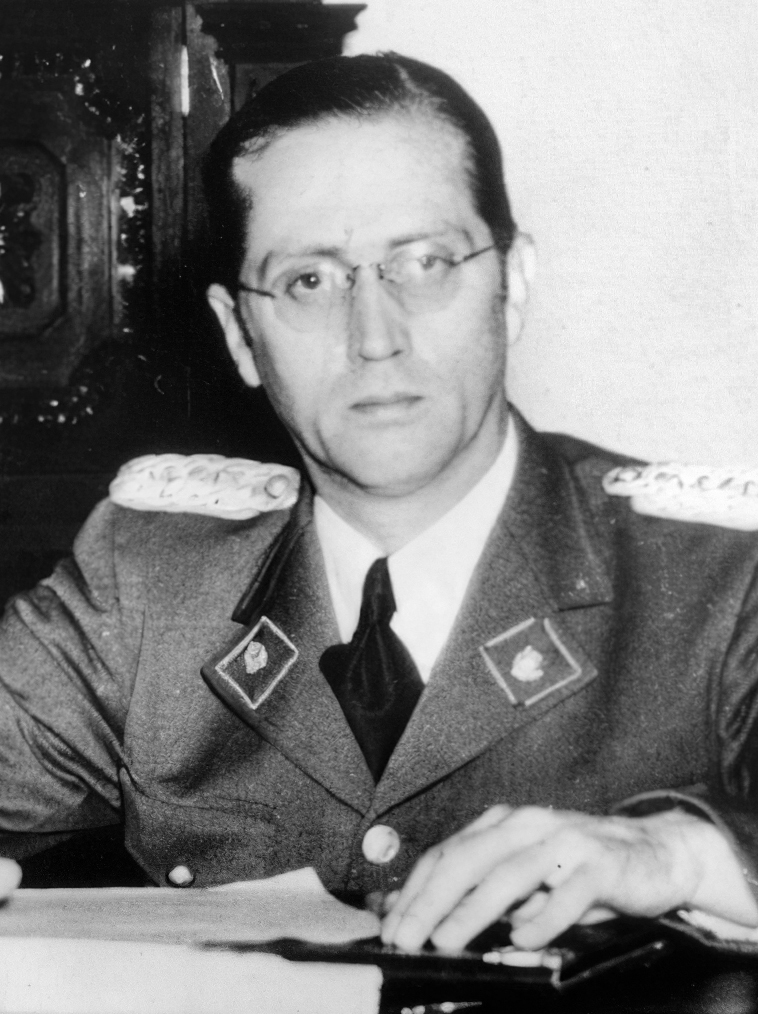

40th President of Venezuela
- In office 24 November 1948 – 13 November 1950
- Preceded by: Rómulo Gallegos
- Succeeded by: Germán Suárez Flamerich

Minister of Defence
- In office 21 October 1945 – 24 November 1948
- President: Romulo Betancourt; Rómulo Gallegos
- Preceded by: Delfín Becerra
- Succeeded by: Marcos Pérez Jiménez

Personal details
- Born: 20 January 1909 Caracas, Venezuela
- Died: 13 November 1950 (aged 41) Caracas, Venezuela
- Spouse: Lucía Devine
- Children: Carlos Román Delgado; Román Carlos Delgado; Elena Delgado

Military service
- Allegiance: (United States of Venezuela) Venezuela
- Branch/service: Venezuelan Army
- Years of service: 1939–1950
- Rank: Lieutenant Colonel

Carlos Román Delgado Chalbaud (20 January 1909 – 13 November 1950) was a Venezuelan military officer who served as president of Venezuela from 1948 to 1950 as leader of a military junta. In 1945, he was one of the high-ranking officers who brought to power the Democratic Action party through a coup d'état. In 1948, as a Minister of Defense, he led another military coup and ruled as President until his assassination in Caracas.

== Early life ==
Delgado Chalbaud was the son of Román Delgado Chalbaud (grandson of a French immigrant and great-grandson of an Andalusian colonist) and Luisa Elena Gómez Velutini (of Corsican descent). He was known as Carlos Delgado Chalbaud because he used the last name of his father Román Delgado Chalbaud as a tribute to his memory. When he was 20, he approached the cruiser Falke in the port of Danzig (Poland). It landed on the coasts of Cumaná on 11 August 1929, with the purpose to overthrow the strongman Juan Vicente Gomez. In this failed operation his father Román commandant of the expedition was killed, leading Carlos to return to France.

Delgado Chalbaud spent most of his life in Paris, where he studied engineering and later attended the Saint-Cyr military academy. He returned to Venezuela in 1939 and was promptly commissioned in the Venezuelan army by president General Eleazar Lopez Contreras with the rank of captain.

== Career ==
As one of the brightest officers of the Armed Forces associated with the group that overthrew Isaías Medina Angarita in 1945, Carlos was a member of the Government Revolutionary Junta that replaced Medina. He was Minister of Defense during the presidencies of Rómulo Betancourt and Rómulo Gallegos.

In 1948, Chalbaud was among those who overthrew the government of president Gallegos and was a member of the Military Junta of Government along with Marcos Pérez Jiménez and Luis Llovera Páez, who was the titular head of the three-person junta.

== Abduction and murder ==
Chalbaud was kidnapped and murdered on 13 November 1950, by a group led by Rafael Simón Urbina and his nephew Domingo Urbina. The kidnapping took place in Caracas between the neighborhood of Country Club and Chapellin and he was murdered in the semi-abandoned Las Mercedes neighborhood. His murder seems to be the unintended outcome of a failed kidnapping led by Simón Urbina, who sought to overthrow the Chalbaud presidency. Some believe Urbina despised Delgado Chalbaud, while others argue they were close until a falling out over politics. The day after the capture and imprisonment of Urbina, he was assassinated by orders of the secret police DSN (Direction of National Security), effictively securing Pérez Jiménez's position as the strongman in Venezuela for the next several years.

== Personal life ==
Chalbaud was married to Lucía Devine, who served as First Lady of Venezuela from 1948 to 1950. Cerro Carlos Delgado Chalbaud (1047m), a mountain in Venezuela's Amazonas estate where the headwaters of the Orinoco River are located, is named after him.

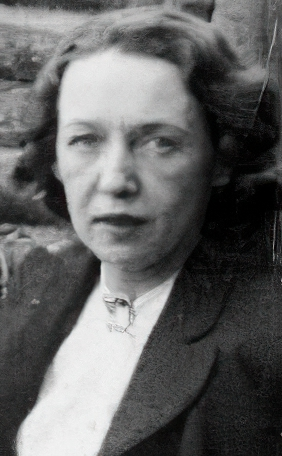
Lucía Devine

== See also ==
- Presidents of Venezuela

Political offices
Preceded by Rómulo Gallegos	President of Venezuela; 1948–1950	Succeeded by Germán Suárez Flamerich
