= Marcos Pérez Jiménez =

Dictator of Venezuela from 1952 to 1958

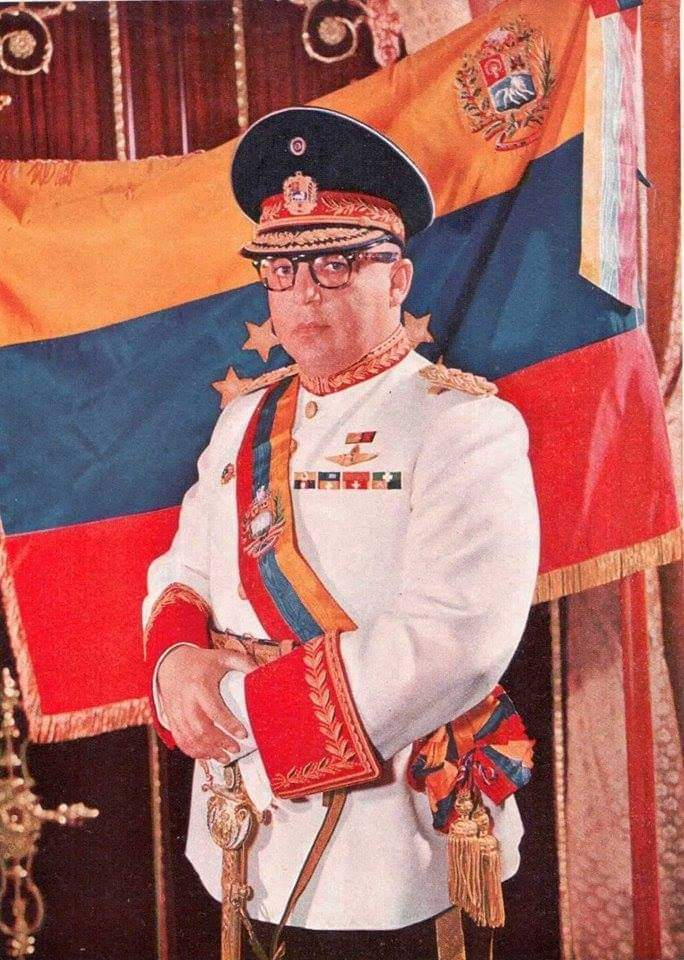
- Marcos Pérez in 1957

42nd President of Venezuela
- In office 2 December 1952 – 23 January 1958; Provisional: 2 December 1952 – 19 April 1953
- Preceded by: Germán Suárez Flamerich
- Succeeded by: Wolfgang Larrazábal

30th Commander-in-Chief of the Venezuelan Army
- In office November 1948 – August 1954
- Preceded by: Carlos Delgado Chalbaud
- Succeeded by: Hugo Fuentes

Minister of Defense
- In office 18 October 1948 – 1 January 1952
- President: Rómulo Gallegos; Carlos Delgado Chalbaud; Germán Suárez Flamerich
- Preceded by: Carlos Delgado Chalbaud
- Succeeded by: Jesús M. Castro León

Personal details
- Born: Marcos Evangelista Pérez Jiménez; 25 April 1914 Táchira, Venezuela
- Died: 20 September 2001 (aged 87) Alcobendas, Spain
- Party: Independent Electoral Front (1951–1958)
- Spouse: Flor María Chalbaud (m. 1945)
- Children: Nelly Gladys Pérez; Margot Pérez-Jiménez; Florángel Pérez-Jiménez; María Sol Pérez-Jiménez; Flor de María Pérez-Jiménez; Marcos Rolando Pérez; Mónica Mercedes Pérez-Jiménez
- Education: Military academy of Venezuela
- Profession: Military officer

Military service
- Allegiance: Venezuela
- Branch/service: Venezuelan Army
- Years of service: 1931–1958
- Rank: Divisional General

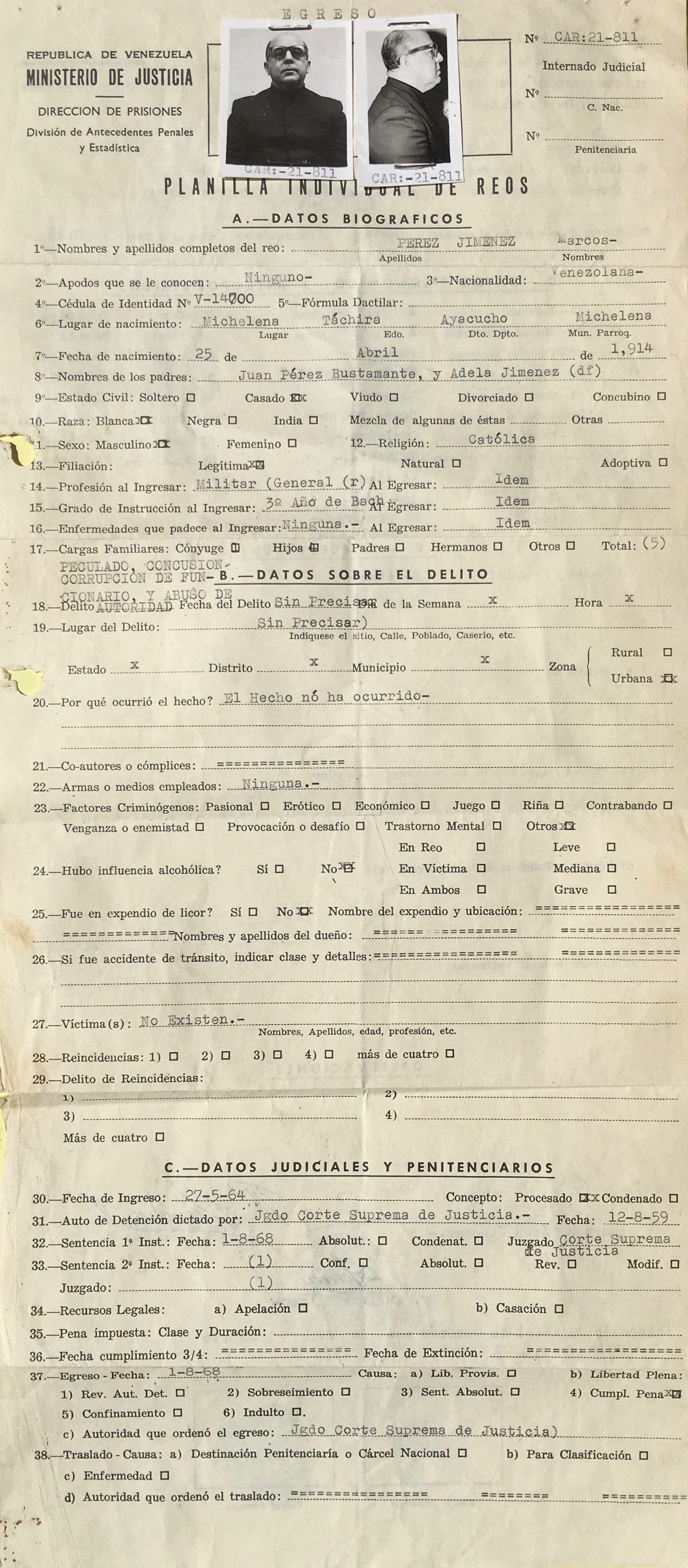

Marcos Evangelista Pérez Jiménez (25 April 1914 – 20 September 2001) was a Venezuelan military officer and the dictator of Venezuela from 1950 to 1958, ruling as member of the military junta from 1950 to 1952 and as president from 1952 to 1958. He took part in the 1948 Venezuelan coup d'état, becoming part of the ruling junta. He ran in the 1952 election. However, the junta cancelled the election when early results indicated that the opposition was ahead and declared Jiménez provisional president. He became president in 1953 and instituted a constitution that granted him dictatorial powers.

Under Pérez's rule, the rise of oil prices facilitated many public works projects, including roads, bridges, government buildings and public housing, as well as the rapid development of industries such as hydroelectricity, mining and steel. He also enriched himself considerably, as well as many of his political allies. The economy of Venezuela developed rapidly while Pérez was in power. On the other hand, Pérez presided over one of the most repressive governments in Venezuela. His government's secret police, the Dirección de Seguridad Nacional (National Security Service), suppressed criticism and imprisoned those who opposed his rule.

Following massive public demonstrations in support of democratic reforms, Pérez was deposed in a coup perpetrated by disgruntled sectors within the Armed Forces of Venezuela on 23 January 1958. Pérez was then exiled to the Dominican Republic, later Miami, United States, from where he was extradited to Venezuela and imprisoned. After serving his sentence, he went on to settle in Spain under the Franco regime's protection.

== Early life, education and early career ==
Marcos Evangelista Pérez Jiménez was born in Michelena, Táchira State. His father, Juan Pérez Bustamante, was a farmer; his mother, Adela Jiménez, a schoolteacher from Cucuta, Colombia. Pérez Jiménez attended school in his home town and in Colombia, and in 1934, he graduated from the Military academy of Venezuela, at the top of his class. He subsequently studied at Chorrillos Military School in Peru.

In 1945, Pérez Jiménez participated in a coup that helped install the founder of the Democratic Action, Rómulo Betancourt, as President of the Revolutionary Government Junta. The government would later become known as El Trienio Adeco. After a constitutional change providing universal suffrage, elections were held in 1947 that resulted in the election of a party member, Rómulo Gallegos.

== 1948 coup d'état ==
Fears of cuts in pay for soldiers and a lack of modernized army equipment led Pérez Jiménez and Carlos Delgado Chalbaud to stage another coup in 1948. Betancourt and Gallegos were exiled, political parties were suppressed and the Communist Party was once again banished by the military junta headed by Delgado Chalbaud, Luis Felipe Llovera Páez and Pérez Jiménez.

After a clumsily arranged kidnapping that ended in the murder of Delgado Chalbaud, the Military Junta changed its name to a Government Junta and reorganized itself with Pérez Jiménez pulling the strings of puppet president, Germán Suárez Flamerich.

== Presidency ==
The junta called an election for 1952 in order to elect a Constituent Assembly that would elect a president and draft a new constitution. When early results showed that the opposition was well on its way to victory, the junta halted the count. On 2 December 1952, it released "final" results that showed the pro-junta "Independent Electoral Front" (FEI) winning a majority of assembly seats. On the same day, the junta dissolved itself and turned over power to the military, who then made Pérez provisional president. The Constitutional Assembly, comprising only FEI delegates after an opposition boycott, formally elected him president on 19 April 1953. Soon afterward, it enacted a constitution that gave the president virtually unlimited powers to take measures he deemed necessary to protect national security, peace and order. For all intents and purposes, it transformed Pérez Jiménez' presidency into a legal dictatorship.

Pérez Jiménez (widely known as "P.J.") changed the name of the country, which had been "United States of Venezuela" since 1864, to the "Republic of Venezuela". This name remained until 1999, when it was changed to the Bolivarian Republic of Venezuela by a constitutional referendum. (Spanish: República Bolivariana de Venezuela)

During his government, Pérez Jiménez undertook many infrastructure projects, including construction of roads, bridges, government buildings, large public housing complexes and the symbolic Humboldt Hotel & Tramway overlooking Caracas. The economy of Venezuela developed rapidly during his term.

The price for this development was high, however. Pérez was not tolerant of criticism, and his government ruthlessly pursued and suppressed the opposition. Opponents of his regime were painted as communists and often treated brutally and tortured.

Pérez Jiménez's government pursued a policy of forced assimilation of Indigenous peoples in Venezuela and the elimination of indigenous culture, with the help of Catholic missionaries. The government adopted the Pátzcuaro Convention, which established the pro-forced assimilationist Inter-American Indian Institute, for the purpose of collaborating with Latin American governments to help force the assimilation of indigenous peoples in the nations of the region.

On 12 November 1954, Pérez was awarded the Legion of Merit by the government of the United States. Foreign capital and immigration were also highly promoted during his presidency, especially from European communities such as those of Spanish, Italian and Portuguese origin. Perez also pushed for vast and ambitious infrastructure programs, based on the policy of reinforced concrete, with construction of buildings, large and modern highways, which linked and renewed ties between states and other major works which greatly modernized the country.

In 1955, Pérez Jiménez withdrew Venezuela from the International Labour Organization.

Pérez Jiménez was up for reelection in 1957. By this time, the opposition had been so cowed that Pérez Jiménez could not possibly have been defeated. However, he dispensed with even those formalities. Instead, he held a plebiscite in which voters could only choose between voting "yes" or "no" to another term for the president. Predictably, Pérez Jiménez won by a large margin, though by all accounts the count was blatantly rigged.

== Cabinet (1952–1958) ==
Ministries
Office	Name	Term
President	Marcos Pérez Jiménez	1952–1958
Home Affairs	Laureano Vallenilla Planchart	1952–1958
	Luis Felipe Llovera Páez	1958
	Antonio Pérez Vivas	1958
Foreign Relations	Aureliano Otañez	1952–1956
	José Loreto Arismendi	1956–1958
	Carlos Felice Cardot	1958
Finance	Aurelio Arreaza Arreaza	1952–1953
	Pedro Guzmán Rivera	1953–1958
	José Giacopini Zárraga	1958
Defense	Marcos Pérez Jiménez	1952–1953
	Oscar Mazzei Carta	1953–1958
	Rómulo Fernández	1958
	Marcos Pérez Jiménez	1958
Development	Silvio Gutiérrez	1952–1958
	Carlos Larrazábal Ugueto	1958
Public Works	Luis Eduardo Chataing	1952–1953
	Julio Bacalao Lara	1953–1956
	Oscar Rodríguez Gragirena	1956–1958
	Oscar Mazzei	1958
Education	Simón Becerra	1952–1953
	José Loreto Arismendi	1953–1956
	Darío Parra	1956–1958
	Nestor Prato Chacón	1958
	Humberto Fernández-Morán	1958
Labor	Carlos Tinoco Rodil	1952–1958
Communications	Oscar Mazzei Carta	1952–1953
	Félix Román Moreno	1953–1956
	Luis Felipe Llovera Páez	1956–1958
	José Saúl Guerrero Rosales	1958
	Luis Felipe Llovera Páez	1958
Agriculture	Alberto Arvelo Torrealba	1952–1953
	Armando Tamayo Suárez	1953–1958
	Luis Sánchez Mogollón	1958
Health and Social Assistance	Pedro A. Gutiérrez Alfaro	1952–1958
Justice	Luis Felipe Urbaneja	1952–1958
	Héctor Parra Márquez	1958
Mines and Hydrocarbons	Edmundo Luongo Cabello	1952–1958
Secretary of Presidency	Raúl Soulés Baldó	1952–1958

== Removal from power ==
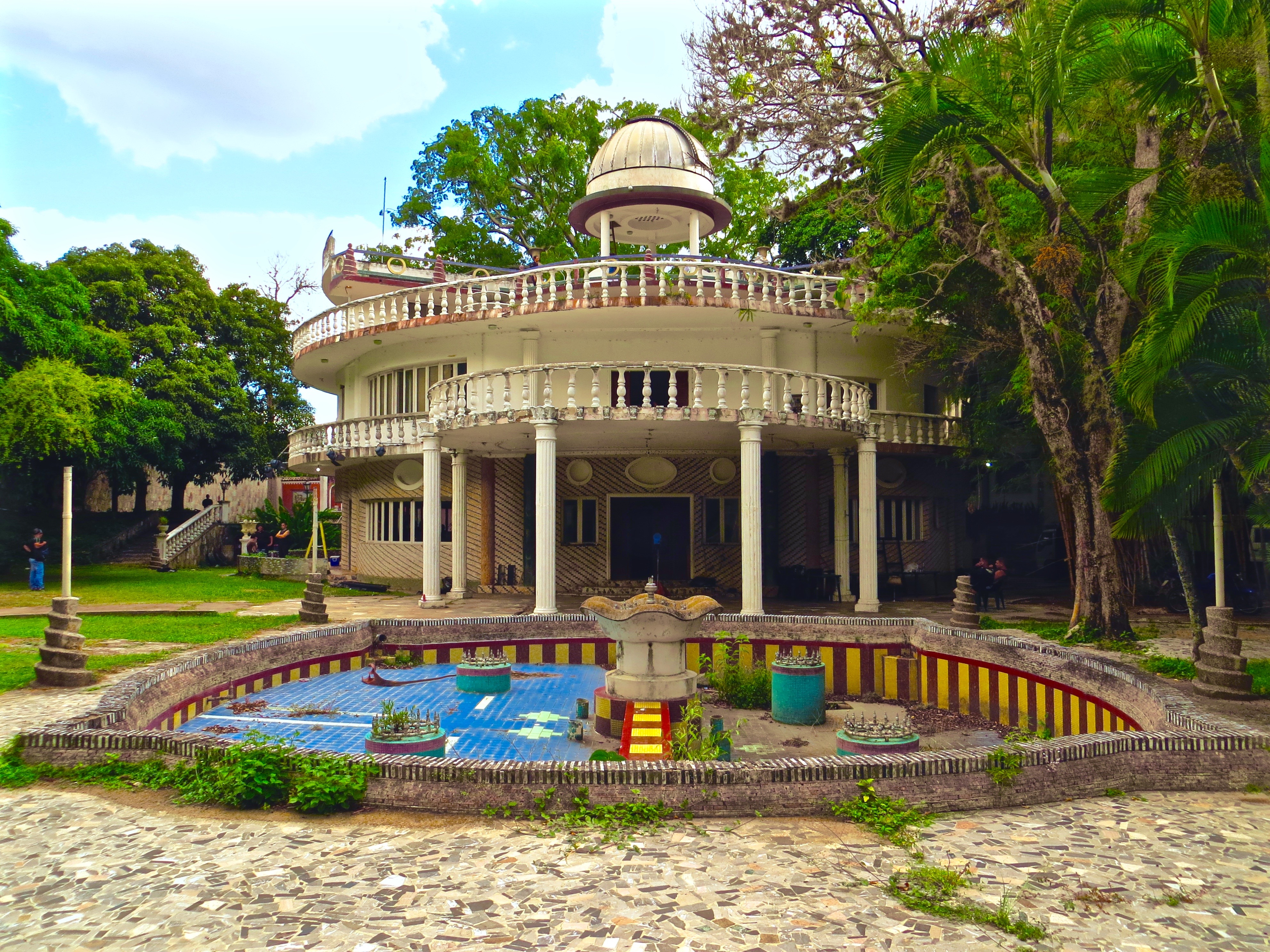
A house of Marcos Pérez Jiménez that featured fountains, a pool, an elevator, an observatory and tunnels.

One of the first public demonstrations against the Pérez Jiménez regime occurred on 1952, after the assassination of opposition leader Leonardo Ruiz Pineda. During a commemorative ceremony in Nuevo Circo, Caracas, hundreds of people waved handkerchiefs during a minute of silence asked in his honor.

On 27 March 1957, Aaron Copland had come to Caracas to conduct the first Venezuelan performance of his Lincoln Portrait. A New York Times reviewer said it had a "magical effect" on the audience. As Copland recalled, "To everyone's surprise, the reigning dictator, who had rarely dared to be seen in public, arrived at the last possible moment." On that evening actress Juana Sujo performed the spoken-word parts of the piece. When she spoke the final words, "...that government of the people, by the people, for the people (del pueblo, por el pueblo y para el pueblo) shall not perish from the earth", the audience rose and began cheering and shouting so loudly that Copland could not hear the remainder of the music."

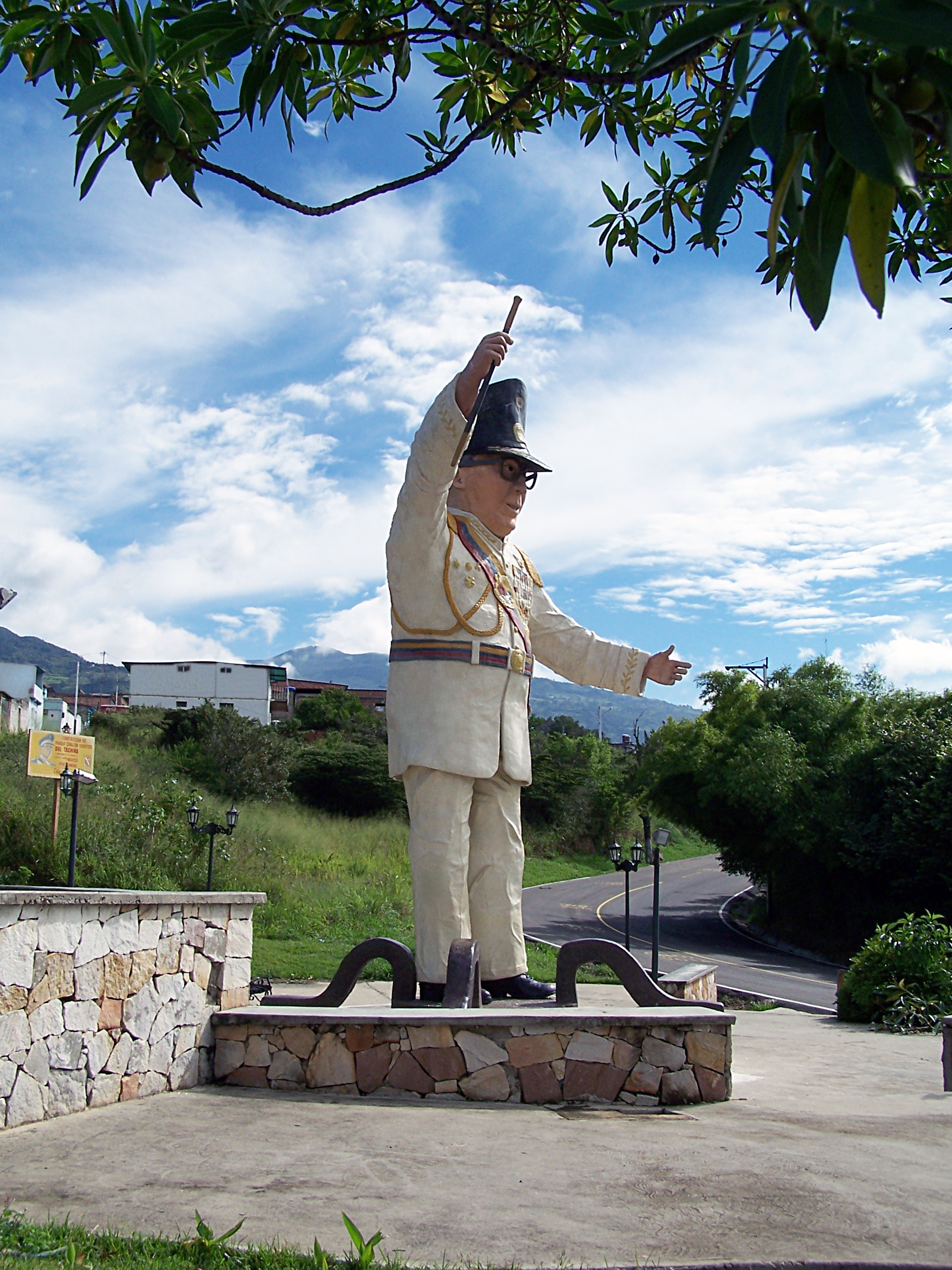
Statue of Marcos Pérez Jiménez in Michelena, Táchira

In January 1958 there was a general uprising, leading to the 1958 Venezuelan coup d'état that deposed Pérez; with rioting in the streets, he left the country, paving the way for the establishment of democracy in Venezuela.

== Post-presidency ==
Pèrez fled to the United States, where he lived until 1963, when he was extradited to Venezuela on charges of embezzling $200 million during his presidential tenure. The 1959–63 extradition of Pérez, related to Financiadora Administradora Inmobiliaria, S.A., one of the largest development companies in South America, and other business connections, is considered by scholars to be a classic study in the precedent for enforcement of administrative honesty in Latin American countries.

While in the United States he fathered a child with German woman Marita Lorenz. According to Lorenz, in March 1961 she met Jiménez, introduced to her as "General Diaz", at a residence in Miami Beach, Florida while working as a courier for Frank Sturgis's International Anti-Communist Brigade. She said she was to collect a $200,000 contribution from Pérez Jiménez for her group. Lorenz said: "He chased me around for six weeks." In August 1963, a paternity suit Lorenz filed against Pérez Jiménez briefly held up his extradition to Venezuela.

Upon arrival in Venezuela he was imprisoned until his trial, which did not take place for another five years. Convicted of embezzlement and sentenced to four years in prison, he was released as he had already spent more time in jail while he awaited trial. He was then exiled to Spain. In 1968, he was elected to the Senate of Venezuela for the Nationalist Civic Crusade, but his election was contested, and he was kept from taking office. A quick law was passed whereby former prisoners were excluded from participating in the governmental process.

He died in Alcobendas, Madrid, Spain, at the age of 87 on 20 September 2001.

== Legacy ==
The period of Pérez Jiménez in power is remembered historically as a government of nationalist roots. His government was based on an ideological pragmatism characterized by the Doctrine of National Wellbeing, that the regime expressed in the New National Ideal would be the philosophical beacon to guide the actions of the government.

His political legacy known perezjimenismo was upheld by the Cruzada Cívica Nacionalista (CCN; Nationalist Civic Crusade) party, which held seats in Congress from 1968 to 1978. In recent years there has been a revival of perezjimenismo and the New National Ideal, with numerous groups revising and upholding the legacy of Marcos Pérez Jiménez. In Venezuelan politics, he symbolizes forms a right-wing caudillo mentality together with Juan Vicente Gómez.

== In popular culture ==
The documentary film Tiempos de dictadura (English: Times of dictatorship), directed by Carlos Oteyza, focuses on his dictatorship, from the 1948 coup d'état against President Rómulo Gallegos and the human rights violations committed by the Seguridad Nacional (including censorship, arrests, torture and extrajudicial killings) to the public works and lavish carnivals promoted by the oil boom.

== Personal life ==
On 4 February 1945, Pérez married Flor María Chalbaud, daughter of Antonio Chalbaud Cardona and Angelina Castro Tejera. The couple had four daughters together.

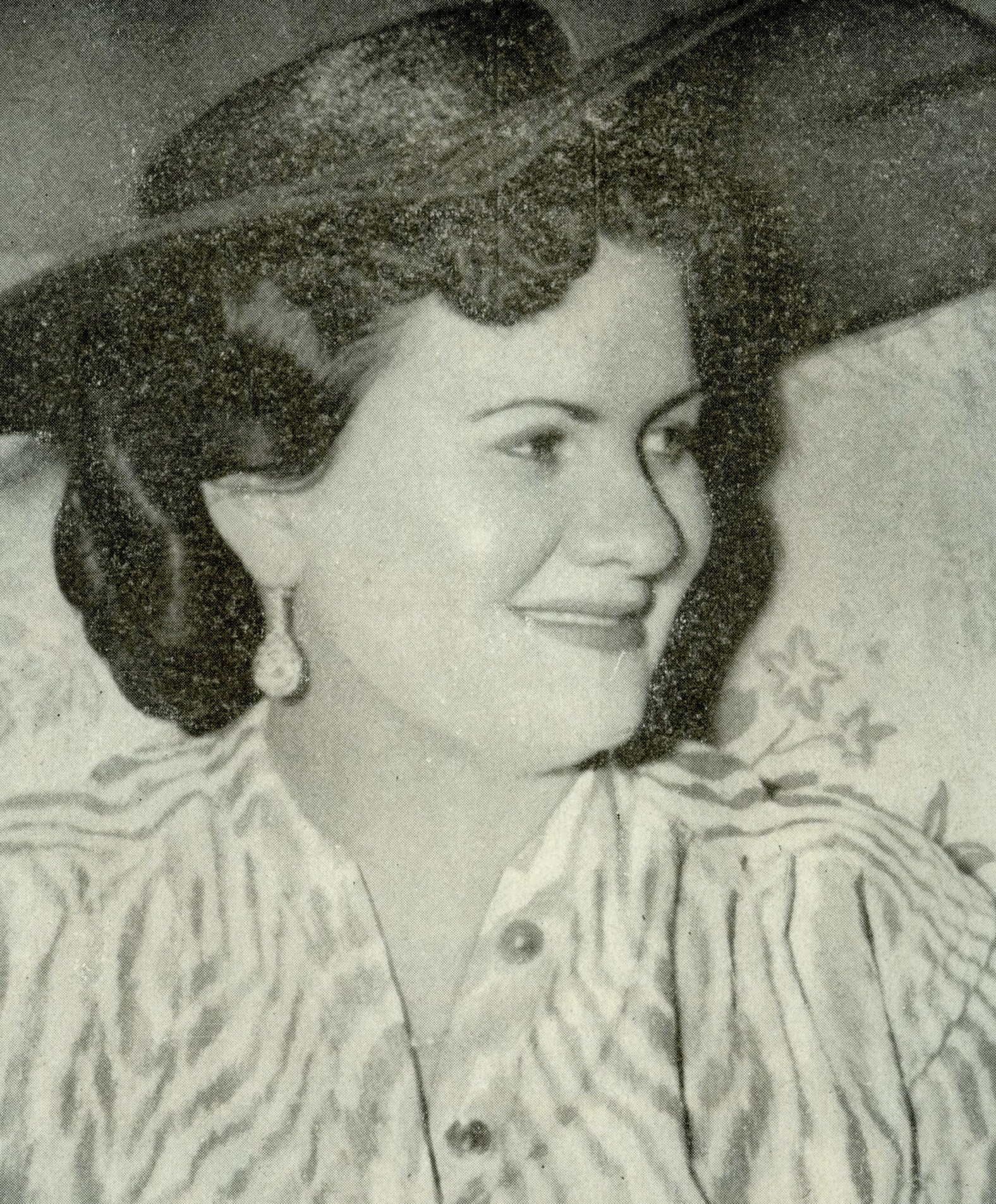
Flor María Chalbaud Cardona

== See also ==
- Perezjimenismo
- History of Venezuela
- Politics of Venezuela
- Presidents of Venezuela
- List of Venezuelans

Political offices
Preceded by Germán Suárez Flamerich	President of Venezuela; 1952–1958	Succeeded by Wolfgang Larrazábal
