= Torture in Venezuela =

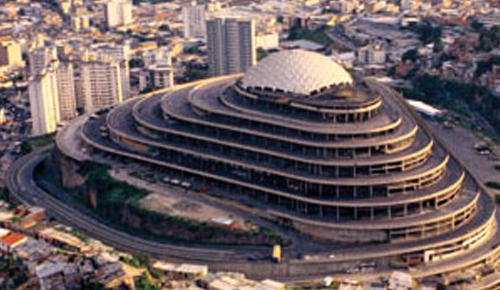
El Helicoide, facility and prison of the Bolivarian National Intelligence Service (SEBIN) where prisoners have described systemic torture and human rights violations

Torture in Venezuela has been a consistent phenomenon throughout its history. The authoritarian Nicolas Maduro regime has been widely documented for acts of torture and violence towards real or perceived opponents of the Maduro government, mainly detainees. The General Directorate of Military Counterintelligence (DGCIM) is known to operate a torture centre in its headquarters in Caracas, known as the Casa de los Sueños (English: "House of Dreams").

Various dictatorships from the Spanish colonial era into the twentieth century utilized torture against common criminals and political opponents. In the twentieth century, torture was common during the dictatorships of Juan Vicente Gómez and Marcos Pérez Jiménez. Torture also took place occasionally during Venezuela's democratic period, particularly during social outbursts, such as during the Caracazo and the 1992 coup attempts.

Into the twenty-first century, torture reached levels that had not been seen since the Marcos Pérez Jiménez dictatorship in the 1950s. During the crisis in Venezuela, the United Nations, Organization of American States, Amnesty International, Human Rights Watch and Foro Penal documented acts of torture and violence towards real or perceived opponents of the Maduro government, mainly detainees, including by state institutions such as the Bolivarian National Intelligence Service (SEBIN).

== Recent decades ==
Under the Bolivarian governments, levels of torture occurred that had not been seen since the dictatorship of Marcos Pérez Jiménez. Following the election of Hugo Chávez, human rights in Venezuela deteriorated. According to Universidad Metropolitana in 2006, "the inquisitorial process" that was abolished in the Venezuelan Declaration of Independence returned to Venezuela. By 2009, the Inter-American Commission on Human Rights released a report stating that Venezuela's government practiced "repression and intolerance". Human rights activist and criminal lawyer Tamara Sujú started documenting cases of torture in Venezuela as early as 2002.

=== Hugo Chávez administration ===
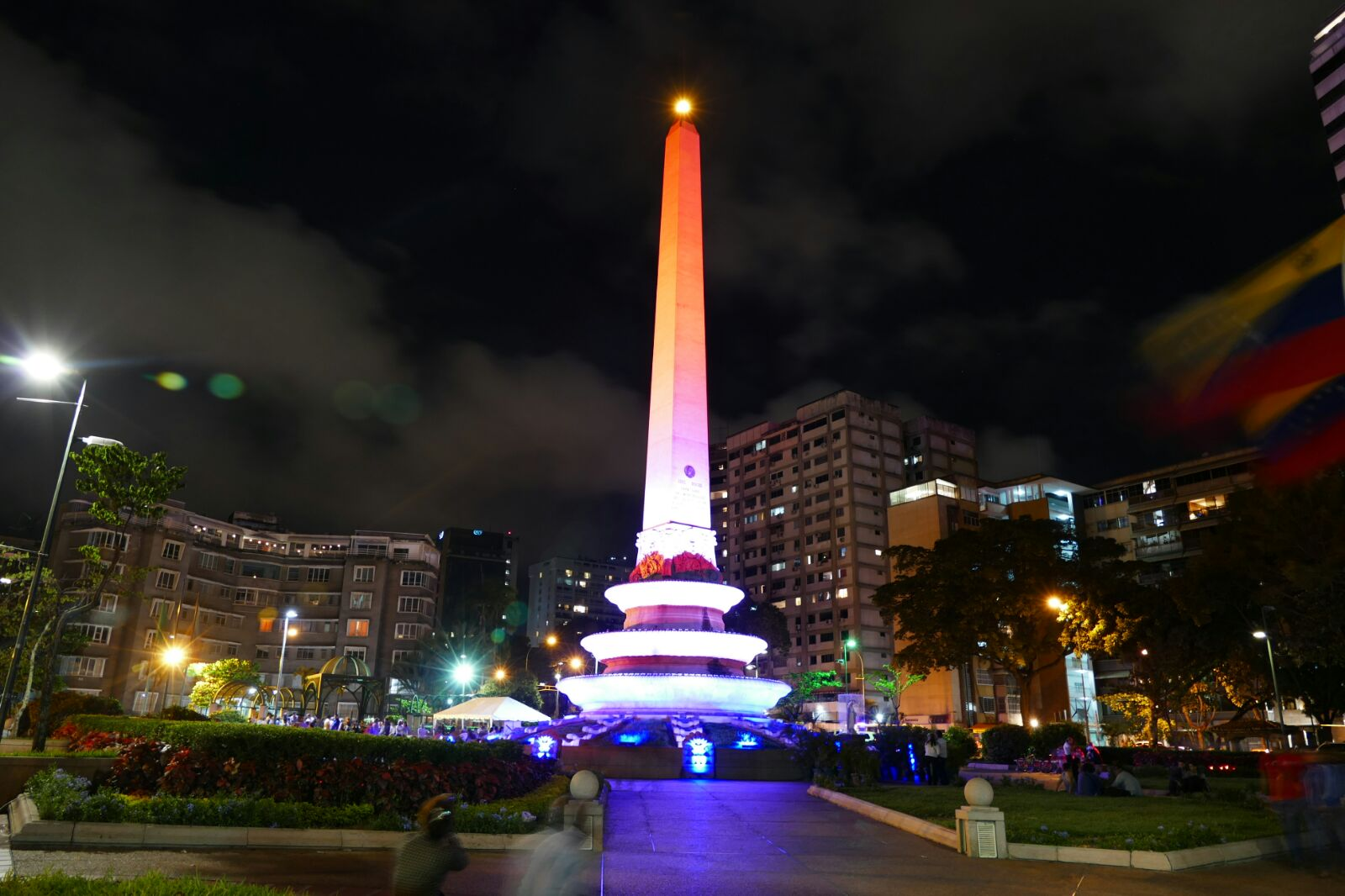
Plaza Altamira, the square in Caracas where opposition military officers where abducted, later tortured and killed in 2003

In 2003, three military men linked to the opposition military officers in the Plaza Altamira during the 2002-2003 general strike were killed. Zaida Peraza (28) Darwin Argüello (21), Ángel Salas (21) and Félix Pinto (22), were found in two different locations on the outskirts of Caracas with signs of having been tortured, bound hand and foot, and having been killed with a shotgun at point blank range. The leader of the group, Enrique Medina Gómez, stated that several witnesses saw how the soldiers, along with two women accompanying them, were detained and forced to board two pick-up trucks by men dressed in black and with their faces covered with balaclavas.

During the 2004 protests, the Bolivarian National Guard detained Carlos Izcaray on 1 March, a conductor of the Venezuelan Symphony Orchestra in a demonstration in which he was not participating. He was tortured and threatened to be killed.

On 17 December 2009, Judge María Lourdes Afiuni was detained at the National Institute for Female Orientation (INOF), a women's prison on the outskirts of Caracas, after releasing of Eligio Cedeño. On 1 July 2015, she described to the court that she was subject to sexual assault in prison, as a result of which she had to undergo a hysterectomy and reconstruction of her sexual organs and bladder, as well as the amputation of one of her breasts that was 25% necrotic as a result of a kick given with a military boot by one of her guards.

=== Nicolás Maduro administration ===
==== 2014 protests ====
During the presidency of Nicolás Maduro, torture in Venezuela increased even further. Amnesty International said that torture by Venezuelan authorities against demonstrators was common during the 2014 Venezuelan protests. The Human Rights Watch report entitled "Punished for Protesting", following research conducted in March during the protests, describes that those who were detained by government authorities were subjected to "severe physical abuse". These included "beatings with fists, helmets, and firearms"; "electric shocks or burns"; "being forced to squat or kneel, without moving, for hours at a time", "being handcuffed to other detainees, sometimes in pairs and others in human chains of dozens of people, for hours at a time" and "extended periods of extreme cold or heat". It also documented that "many victims and family members we spoke with said they believed they could be victims of reprisals by police, guard members, or gangs sympathetic to the government if they reported the abuses."

By late February 2014, the NGO Foro Penal declared that it documented at least 33 cases of torture whose victims formally denounced before prosecutors and judges the abuses to which they were subjected. Gonzalo Himiob, a director of the organization, declared that the abuses were "continuous and systematic" and that Venezuelan authorities, including the Bolivarian Intelligence Service (SEBIN) were "generally accused of beating detainees, in many cases severely, and many people have indicated that the security forces have robbed them, taking their cell phones, money and jewelry". The torture included beatings, electric shocks, and asphyxiation, as well as psychological torture. The detainees would be denied access to lawyers and would be forced to sign a document stating that they had been assisted by defense lawyers. Foro Penal also reported that during torture, victims wounds were wiped with rags doused in gasoline.

A Panel of Independent Experts appointed by the Secretary General of the Organization of American States documented several cases where detainees suffered abuse during both their arrest and detention afterwards and did not have access to medical treatment while in custody. On 13 February 2014, during his arrest in Valencia, Carabobo state, Jorge León and his companions were severely beaten with the butt of guns, helmets and kicks. Jorge suffered a skull fracture and rupture of the left eardrum with loss of cerebrospinal fluid as a result of the blows. When they were detained on 24 February and during their transfer, Andrea Jiménez and a companion were threatened with rape, death and dismemberment, insulting them with the terms "guarimberos", "squalids" and "bourgeois". During their detention from 12 March 2014 in Barquisimeto, Lara state, Keyla Brito and her daughter Karkelys were stripped naked in the National Guard 47th detachment, being beaten and insulted. In another case, on 19 March 2014, a member of the Bolivarian National Police pointed a gun at Gloria Tobón's head during a protest in Táchira state, while another officer told him to "kill that bitch". Upon arresting her, troops poured vinegar in her face and beat her. Robert González and eight of his companions were arrested while protesting on 21 April 2014 in La Victoria, Aragua state, being detained for four days. During their confinement, they were beaten and threatened, including threats of death and disappearance. They were subjected to asphyxiation by tear gas canisters, as well as food, water and sleep deprivation several times.

A former official of the Bolivarian Intelligence Service (SEBIN) told the Independent International Fact-Finding Mission on Venezuela that its director, Carlos Calderón, was directly involved in torture within the agency during the protests. Among other alleged ill-treatment, he reportedly placed plastic bags on protesters, or poured water on them, and beat them to extract information.

Student protesters were tortured sometimes to force them to say that they participated in a joint plan with foreigners to overthrow the Venezuelan government. In addition to torture, students have denounced sexual violence by the Bolivarian National Guard (GNB). Protester Juan Manuel Carrasco was beaten and sodomized with an automatic rifle by National Guardsmen, forensic tests after his detention corroborated the assault. Attorney General Luisa Ortega Díaz initially dismissed the complaint, saying "Do you believe that a person who has been raped (...) could sit in the presentation hearing?". However, the Public Ministry's Office announced on 11 April that it was charging three security officers for inflicting cruel treatment on Carrasco and other demonstrators.

The director of Foro Penal, Alfredo Romero, asked both the opposition and the Venezuelan government to pay attention to the unheeded calls on human rights violations.

The Attorney General's Office reported that it was conducting 145 investigations related to human rights abuses and that 17 security officials had been detained in connection with these events. President Maduro and other government officials accepted that human rights abuses had occurred, but said that these were isolated cases and not a systematic pattern. The Venezuelan government opposed when opposition parties called for a debate on torture in the National Assembly, saying "the violent ones are not us, the violent ones are in an opposition group".

Ombudswoman Gabriela Ramírez asked to distinguish torture from "excessive or disproportionate use of force", arguing that torture happened when used to extract confessions.

In November 2014, Venezuela appeared before the United Nations Committee Against Torture over cases between 2002 and 2014, which criticized the Venezuelan National Commission for the Prevention of Torture for being biased in favor towards the Venezuelan government. The Committee had also expressed concern with "beatings, burnings and electric shocks in efforts to obtain confessions" that occurred during the 2014 Venezuelan protests and that of the 185 investigations for abuses during the protests, only 5 individuals had been charged. The Committee also said that "of the 185 investigations carried out by the Public Prosecutor's Office for cruel treatment, only 5 charges have been brought, and the 2 investigations for torture are still ongoing. The Committee is concerned that, according to the information received, a large number of the persons concerned did not report the facts for fear of reprisals and some were allegedly threatened after reporting them".

United Nations Special Rapporteur on Torture Juan E. Méndez stated on 11 March 2015 that Venezuela had ignored requests for information and that he had made "conclusions based on the lack of response" and "concluded that the government violated the rights of prisoners", further saying that the Maduro government failed "with the obligation to investigate, prosecute and punish all acts of torture and cruel, inhuman or degrading treatment".

==== La Tumba ====
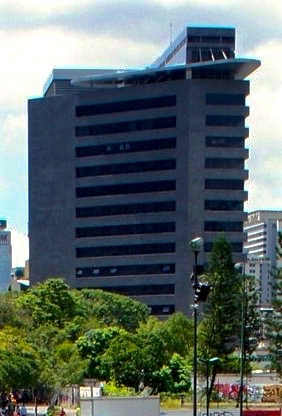
La Tumba (The Tomb), a SEBIN prison where many prisoners have been tortured

La Tumba (The Tomb), one of the headquarters and prisons of SEBIN, has been used for white torture and some of its prisoners have attempted suicide. Conditions in La Tumba have resulted with prisoner illnesses, though Venezuelan authorities refuse to medically treat those imprisoned. Bright lights are continuously left on and prison cells are set at near-freezing temperatures.

On 2 March 2015, the Inter-American Commission on Human Rights (IACHR) issued precautionary measures of protection in resolution 6/2015 in favor of Lorent Saleh and Gerardo Carrero in response to the request made on 8 July 2013 by Tamara Sujú on behalf of the Foro Penal in which she asked the agency to require the Venezuelan government to protect the life and personal integrity of Saleh and, later in the proceedings, also the protection of Carrero for the violation of his human rights.

The IACHR document noted that Saleh and Guerrero were "located in a basement (five floors below ground), known as La Tumba, of the building that serves as the main headquarters of the SEBIN", where they are subjected to "prolonged isolation without contact with other people, in a confined space of 2 × 3 meters, with video cameras and microphones in each of their cells, without access to sunlight or outdoors," and the two prisoners have reported suffering from "nervous breakdowns, stomach problems, diarrhea, vomiting, spasms, joint pains, headaches, dermatitis, panic attacks, muscle disorders and temporary disorientation" without "presumably receiving adequate medical attention." The Commission considered that the students "are in a situation of seriousness and urgency, since their lives and personal integrity would be at risk", and asked the Venezuelan government to adopt the measures necessary to preserve the life and personal integrity of detainees, in particular to provide adequate medical care in accordance with the conditions of their pathologies, and to ensure that their detention conditions are in accordance with international standards, taking into consideration their current health status.

On 20 April 2015, Lorent tried to commit suicide in his cell, which was stopped by SEBIN officials. His lawyer denounced that by then he had not received a response from the Public Ministry about the request for psychiatric evaluations of Saleh and Gabriel Valles.

==== 2017 protests ====
External videos
- Human Rights Watch multimedia report on abuses on YouTube

During the 2017 Venezuelan protests, human rights groups documented several instances of torture against detainees. The United Nations High Commissioner for Human Rights (UNHCHR) denounced the "widespread and systematic use of excessive force" during the protests and held the government responsible for at least protesters and assured that "several thousand people have been arbitrarily detained, many of them have been victims of ill-treatment and even torture". The Organization of American States (OAS) documented over 290 cases of torture, and Tamara Sujú denounced 192 cases of sexual torture before the organization during the organisation's first hearing to analyse crimes against humanity in the country. On 2 July 2017, a group of twenty-eight students from the Universidad Pedagógica Experimental Libertador in Maracay, Aragua state, who were staying overnight on campus as part of demonstrations were arrested in the early morning. The security forces raided the university, tied up and beat the security guards, and threatened and beat the students as they were taken away. In another protest, a "trancazo" in the vicinity of the Caracas Sambil shopping mall, multiple protesters were detained in July and subsequently tortured. One of them, in addition to being threatened and beaten, had dirt poured on a head wound caused by the beatings, had pepper spray thrown in his face, had his hair cut with a knife and had his clothes torn, and extorting him for money to be released. Orlando Moreno, a student and representative of the Come Venezuela opposition party, was hung in a stress position in La Pica Prison after being arrested on 27 June and refusing to make a video confession. Moreno spent nine hours in the position, in which he could barely touch the ground with the tips of his toes, being insulted beaten. On 20 July 2017, National Guardsmen broke into the home of Reny Elías to arrest him, an employee of the Health Secretariat of the Zulia governor's office. He was taken to a place where he was forced to lie on the floor along with twenty other people, where officers of the Bolivarian National Police insulted them, threatening to kill them. They trampled them, beat them with rifles and threw tear gas and water in their faces, telling them "Tell the opposition to come and get you out of here!".

I order SEBIN to sue those spokesmen of the opposition who are accusing of barbarities and improper acts that are never discussed in this republic.

— President Nicolás Maduro

Foro Penal stated that "most of the detainees are beaten once they are arrested, while they are being transferred to a temporary detention site where they are to be brought before a judge". The NGO mentioned an instance with "a group of 40 people arrested for alleged looting, 37 reported that they were beaten before their hair was forcefully shaved off their heads". In other examples of abuses, "15 reported that they were forced to eat pasta with grass and excrement. The regime’s officials forced dust from tear gas canisters up their noses to pry open their mouths. They then shoved the pasta with excrement in their mouths and made them swallow it". In another instance, a woman was arrested in Altos Mirandinos by the National Guard where she was beaten and then urinated on by three National Guardsmen who threatened to rape her. Venezuela's intelligence agency, SEBIN, was ordered by President Maduro on 16 April to take legal actions against individuals who state that they have been tortured by authorities. Venezuelan authorities have also used force to gain confessions, and sexual violence towards arrested protesters has been documented as well.

In a 15 June statement, Human Rights Watch stated that high levels officials of the government, such as Major General Antonio José Benavides Torres, the head of the Bolivarian National Guard; Chief General Vladimir Padrino López, the defense minister and the strategic operational commander of the Armed Forces; Major General Néstor Reverol, the interior minister, General Carlos Alfredo Pérez Ampueda, director of the Bolivarian National Police; Major General Gustavo González López, the national intelligence director, and Captain Siria Venero de Guerrero, the military attorney general, were responsible for the human rights violations and abuses performed by Venezuelan security forces during the protests. Venezuelan officials praised authorities for their actions and denied any wrongdoing.

Human Rights Watch has reviewed extensive evidence implicating the Venezuelan security forces ... in a wide range of serious abuses since protesters took to the streets ... Security forces have used excessive force and condoned attacks by armed pro-government groups against massive anti-government protests, leading to dozens of deaths and hundreds of injuries. Security forces have also engaged in arbitrary arrests and physical abuse against detainees that in some cases would amount to torture.

— Human Rights Watch

==== 2018 presidential elections ====
Surgeon José Alberto Marulanda was arrested on 20 May 2018 by officers of the General Directorate of Military Counterintelligence (DGCIM), the day on which presidential elections were held in Venezuela. During his detention, Marulando was tortured by officials and beaten to the point of becoming deaf in his right ear and losing sensation in his hands. By November 2018, six months after his arrest, his hearing had been postponed six times.

=== Foreign involvement ===
The Organization of American States, with information provided by the NGO CASLA, reported that some of the 46,000 members of the Cuban Revolutionary Armed Forces assisting the government of Nicolás Maduro were involved with torturing Venezuelans who opposed Maduro. Prisoners reported that they recognized Cuban accents among those who were torturing them.

== Colonial era ==
Under rule of the Royal Audiencia of Caracas and the Spanish Inquisition, inhabitants of Venezuela faced serious repression. The Catholic Church served as an important source to royalists, with priests serving as informants who would provide accusations to Inquisition judges because they believed crimes against the Spanish king were crimes against God. Judges then held the power to torture those accused of crimes during interrogations in order to obtain a confession. However, this practice was rare in Spanish-ruled Venezuela since it had already become controversial, even in Europe.

When the Royal Audiencia was deposed and the Supreme Junta was established, the Venezuelan Declaration of Independence explicitly stated that the death penalty was abolished, torture was forbidden and that courts would presume innocence. However, as Venezuela began to face conflicts shortly after its independence, repressive behaviors within the government returned.

== Juan Vicente Gómez dictatorship ==
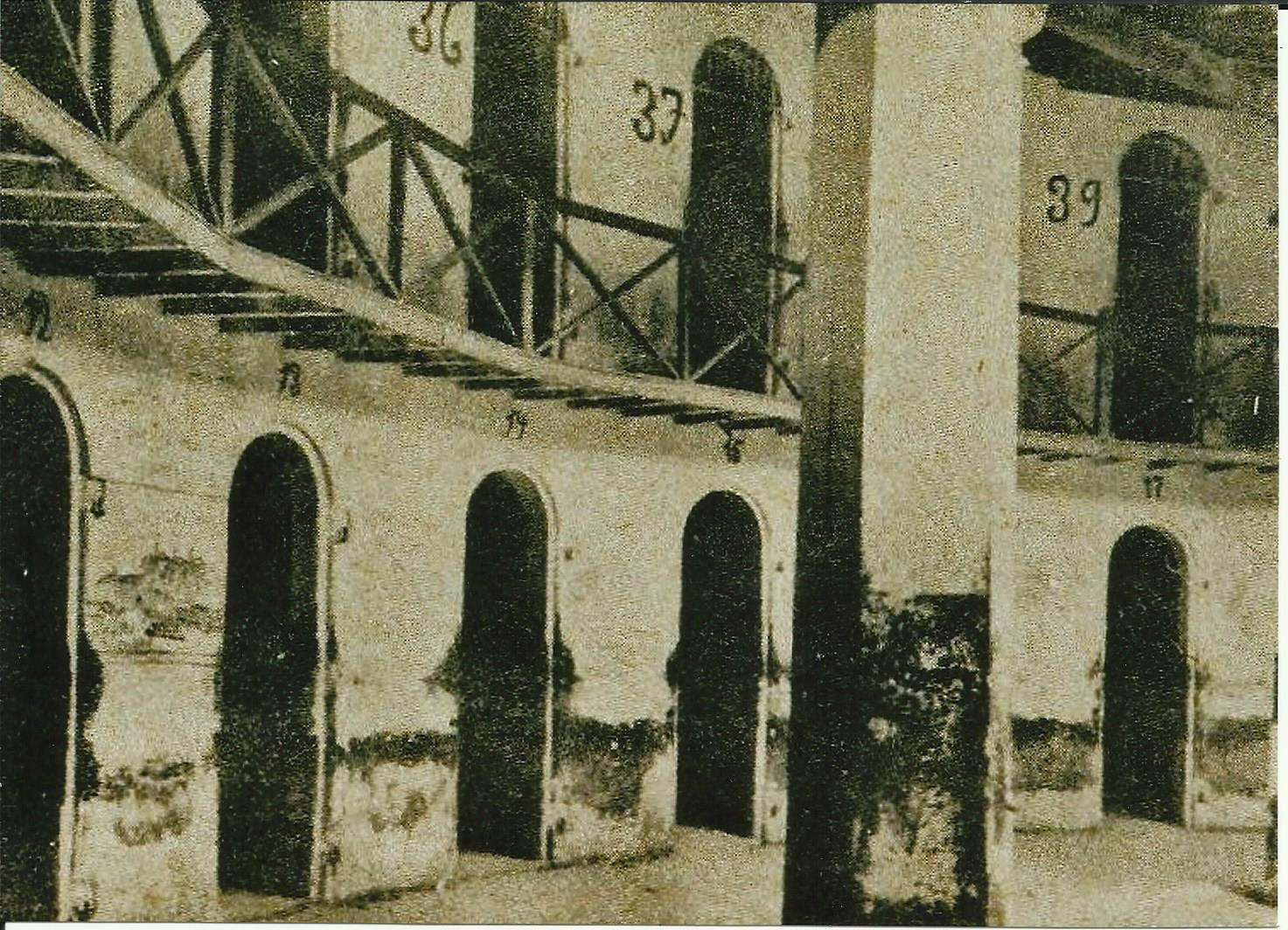
Cells of La Rotunda in 1924

In 1854, a house of correction called "La Rotunda" was built to rehabilitate common criminals. Under President Juan Pablo Rojas Paúl, La Rotunda was converted into a prison. La Rotunda grew in prominence under the governments of Cipriano Castro and Juan Vicente Gómez between 1900 and 1935, who heavily utilized the prison for political persecution. Types of punishment and torture included being placed in stocks, strappado, ball and chain, having a rope tightened around the temple and having poison or ground glass placed into food. It was not uncommon that prisoners were tortured or starved to death.

Many of political prisoners were sent to forced labor, the most famous of which was the construction of the Transandean Highway in the Venezuelan Andes. One of the cruelest torturers in La Rotunda was a common prisoner named Nereo Pacheco who, by orders of Gómez, was used by the guards as an element of punishment against the political prisoners.

La Rotunda was demolished in 1936 by President Eleazar López Contreras, who was Minister of War of Vicente Gómez. López Contreras chose the name "La Concordia" for the square that would be located in the same place where the jail had been, to give an idea of a new time of understanding. With this he wanted to give strength to his recently inaugurated and fragile mandate because, from his position as minister, it was very unlikely that López Contreras was unaware of what was happening to the prisoners of La Rotunda. The demolition of the prison by López Contreras has been seen as an attempt to erase one the historical memory due to his own involvement.

== Marcos Pérez Jiménez dictatorship ==
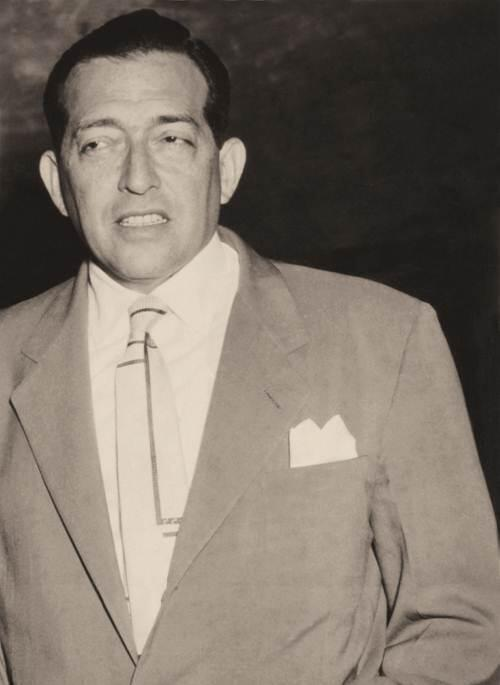
Pedro Estrada, head of the Dirección de Seguridad Nacional during the dictatorship of Marcos Pérez Jiménez

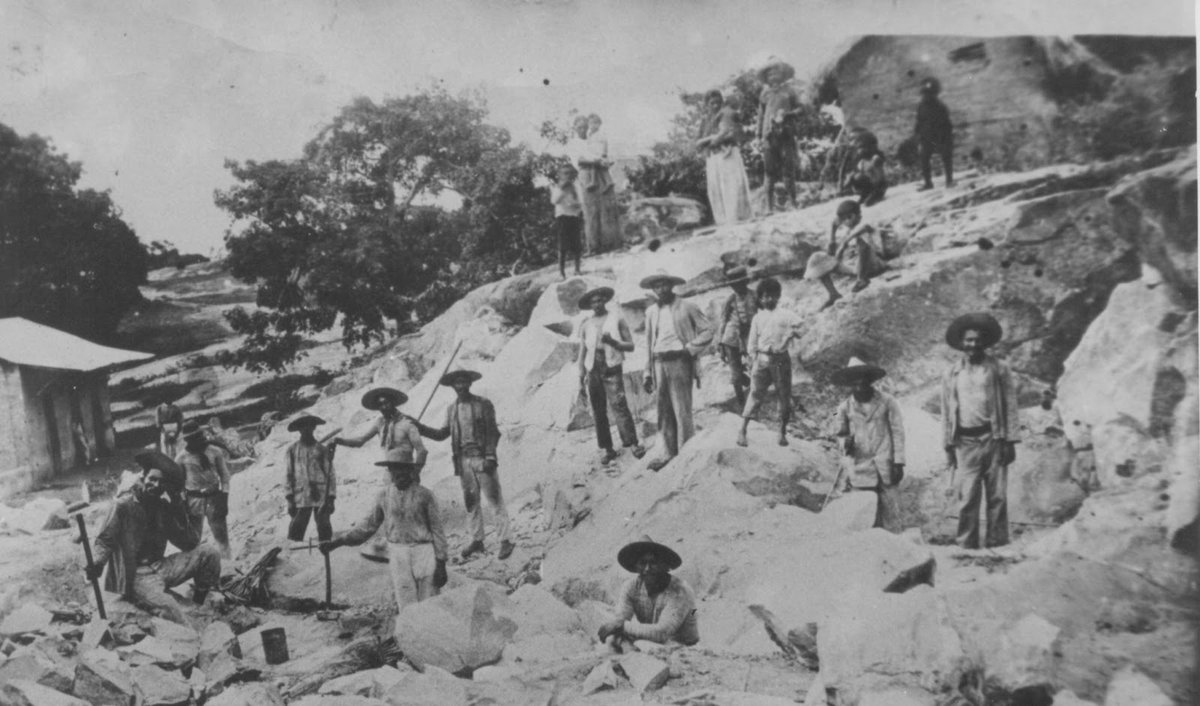
Guasina Island labor camp prisoners

Under the dictator Marcos Pérez Jiménez, Venezuelan authorities held little regard for the human rights of citizens. The dictatorship created a secret police, the Dirección de Seguridad Nacional, that was in charge of arresting, torturing and imprisoning political opponents, and was characterized by its excessive repression of dissidence and torture of detainees. Police often raided homes without search warrants and individuals were imprisoned without evidence. While initially detained, individuals faced torture in instances of interrogation. Political police targeted, arrested, tortured and killed his opponents. In the National Security headquarters throughout the country, political prisoners were subjected to different methods of torture, such as the ice chamber, standing up barefoot in a car rims, blows with steel balls, electric bands, batons and other forms of physical mistreatment. Those who were attacked include future Venezuelan presidents Rómulo Betancourt, Jaime Lusinchi and Luis Herrera Campins. Lusinchi was jailed for two months in 1952 and was beaten with a sword.

At that time, the Colón Square in Los Caobos, Caracas, was the epicenter of student protests. During the celebration of Columbus Day in 1951, several Venezuelans who were protesting against the dictatorship were arrested: José Amín, Miguel Astor Martínez, Antonio Ávila Barrios, Francisco Barrios, Federico Estaba, Gerardo Estaba, Luis José Estaba, Darío Hernández, Manuel Vicente Magallanes, Eloy Martínez Méndez, Salón Meza Espinosa and Juan Regalado. This group was known as The Twelve Apostles because they were a dozen detainees. The twelve apostles were forced to stand together for three days, deprived of their physiological needs. Each one was tortured in a personalized way.

Although the Pérez Jiménez regime announced the closure of the labor camp on Guasina Island on 17 December 1952, in Delta Amacuro state, records such as the work Se llamaba SN, by José Vicente Abreu, document the forced labor and subhuman conditions on the island.

== Puntofijo era ==
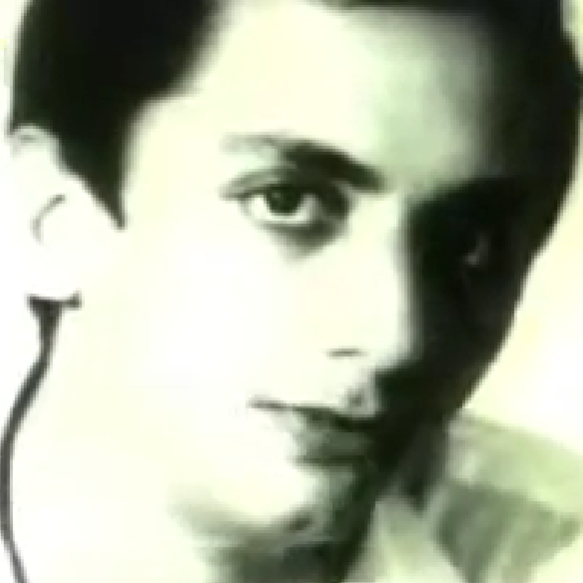
Jorge Antonio Rodríguez, leader of Revolutionary Left Movement and founder of the Socialist League, tortured to death by DISIP agents in 1976

The Expediente Negro, written by José Vicente Rangel and published in 1972, deals with the human rights abuses against peasants in the 1960s.

In 1976, during the first government of Carlos Andrés Pérez, the leader of Revolutionary Left Movement and founder of the Socialist League, Jorge Antonio Rodríguez, was detained by agents of the National Directorate of Intelligence and Prevention Services (DISIP), who tortured him to death.

Human Rights Watch wrote in a 1993 report that the second administration of Carlos Andrés Pérez "was marked by an increase in human rights violations, including arbitrary detentions, torture, extrajudicial executions, the violent repression of popular demonstrations and protests" and that the judicial branch largely ignored abuses by his government. Amnesty International reported that "[t]orture and ill-treatment are widespread in Venezuela, in some cases resulting in death", describing abuse techniques used by authorities as "simple but sophisticated...designed to cause maximum pain with the minimum of marks." Police frequently arbitrarily detained residents of Caracas' impoverished barrios. Torture was most common in poor neighborhoods and directed towards political, student and grass-root activists and included some minors. It included beatings, blows to sensitive areas (including genitals), use of batons, blows to ears often resulting in ruptured eardrums, asphyxiation in water (sometimes with feces and urine), asphyxiation with bags (sometimes with addition of ammonia or insecticide), "peinillazo" beatings with unsharpened sabres known as peinillas, shocks with cattle prods to sensitive areas and strappado positions, dangling detainees from their bound wrists. DISIP officers were also reported to have beat protesters detained during the Caracazo with baseball bats and pipes. Although authorities condemned torture, prohibited by Venezuelan and international law, Amnesty International's delegation "concluded that torture and ill-treatment continued unabated." The Caracas Metropolitan Police and National Directorate of Intelligence and Prevention Services (DISIP) were used as tools to persecute dissenters.

Following the 1992 Venezuelan coup d'état attempts against President Pérez, a crackdown on alleged plotters resulted in multiple reports of torture perpetrated by the Directorate of Military Intelligence (DIM), and the Directorate of Intelligence of the Army (DIE). Political activists and students were also tortured when constitutional protections were removed following the 1992 coup d'état attempts, with many requiring medical treatment following their experiences.

== International treaties ==
The main international instruments on torture signed and ratified by the Venezuelan State are the following:

- International system: The Convention against Torture and Other Cruel, Inhuman or Degrading Treatment or Punishment (10 December 1984).
- Inter-American system: The Inter-American Convention to Prevent and Punish Torture (9 December 1985).
- The Rome Statute, which establishes torture is a crime against humanity.
- The Istanbul Protocol (9 August 1999), a manual for the efficient investigation and documentation of torture and other cruel, inhuman or degrading treatment or punishment.

Article 23 of the Constitution of Venezuela establishes that "treaties, covenants and conventions relating to human rights, signed and ratified by Venezuela, have constitutional hierarchy and prevail in the internal order, to the extent that they contain norms on their enjoyment and exercise that are more favourable than those established by this Constitution and the law of the Republic, and are of immediate and direct application by the courts and other organs of the Public Power".

== Reactions ==
In December 2014, the United States signed Venezuela Defense of Human Rights and Civil Society Act of 2014 to impose targeted sanctions on Venezuelan individuals responsible for human rights violations as a result of the 2014 Venezuelan protests. The law allows the freezing of assets and visa bans for those accused of using acts of violence or violating the human rights of those opposing the Venezuelan government. In March 2015, the United States froze assets and revoked visas of several senior officials connected to human rights abuses in Venezuela; these sanctions were condemned in Latin America.

== See also ==
- Political prisoners in Venezuela
- Enforced disappearances in Venezuela
- International Criminal Court investigation in Venezuela
- Independent International Fact-Finding Mission on Venezuela

== Bibliography ==
- Informe de la Secretaría General de la Organización de los Estados Americanos y del Panel de Expertos Internacionales Independientes sobre la Posible Comisión de Crímenes de Lesa Humanidad en Venezuela [Report of the General Secretariat of the Organization of American States and of the Panel of Independent International Experts on the Possible Commission of Crimes Against Humanity in Venezuela] (PDF) (in Spanish). Washington D.C.: Organization of American States. 29 May 2018.
