= Jorge Rodríguez (Venezuelan politician) =

Venezuelan doctor (born 1965)

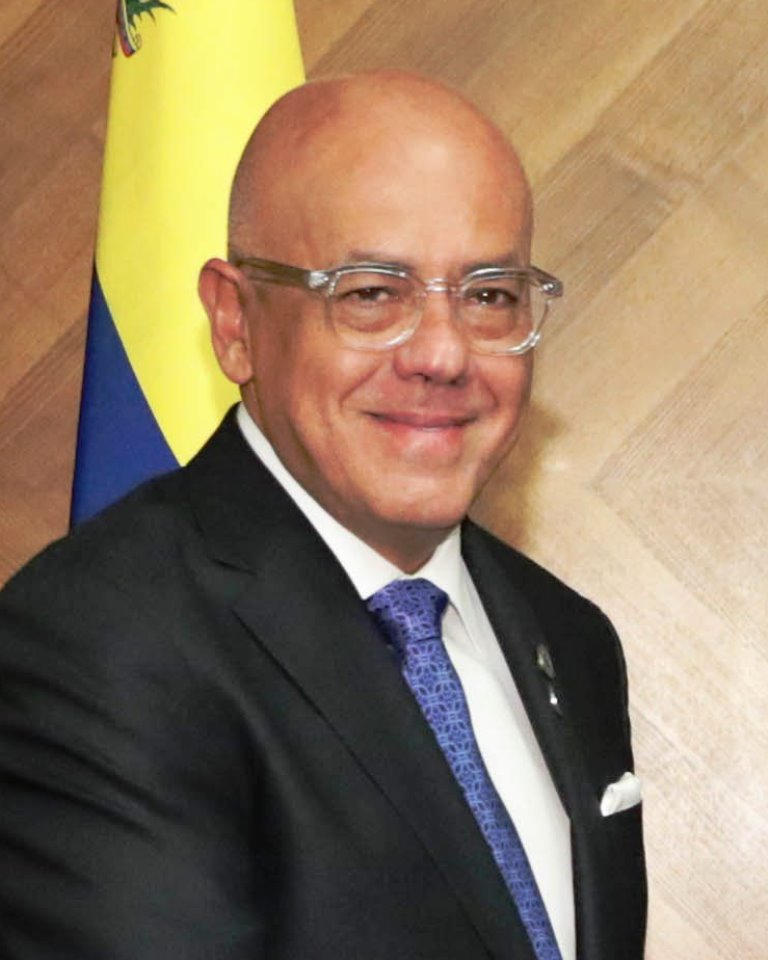
- Rodríguez in 2023

12th President of the National Assembly of Venezuela
- Incumbent (contested)
- Assumed office 5 January 2021
- Disputed with: Dinorah Figuera
- Preceded by: Luis Parra

Deputy of the National Assembly for the Capital District
- Incumbent
- Assumed office 5 January 2021

Minister of Popular Power for Communication and Information
- In office 3 November 2017 – 4 September 2020
- President: Nicolás Maduro
- Preceded by: Ernesto Villegas
- Succeeded by: Freddy Ñáñez

5th Mayor of the Libertador Bolivarian Municipality
- In office 1 December 2009 – 3 November 2017
- Preceded by: Freddy Bernal
- Succeeded by: Luis Lira (acting)

Vice President of Venezuela
- In office 8 January 2007 – 3 January 2008
- President: Hugo Chávez
- Preceded by: Jose Vicente Rangel
- Succeeded by: Ramón Carrizales

President of the National Electoral Council
- In office 2005–2006
- Preceded by: Francisco Carrasquero
- Succeeded by: Tibisay Lucena

Personal details
- Born: Jorge Jesús Rodríguez Gómez; 9 November 1965 (age 61) Barquisimeto, Lara, Republic of Venezuela
- Party: United Socialist Party of Venezuela (PSUV) (from 2007); Fifth Republic Movement (until 2007)
- Spouse: Daniela Rivas (m. 2012)
- Children: 3
- Parent: Jorge Antonio Rodríguez (father)
- Relatives: Delcy Rodríguez (sister)
- Education: Central University of Venezuela

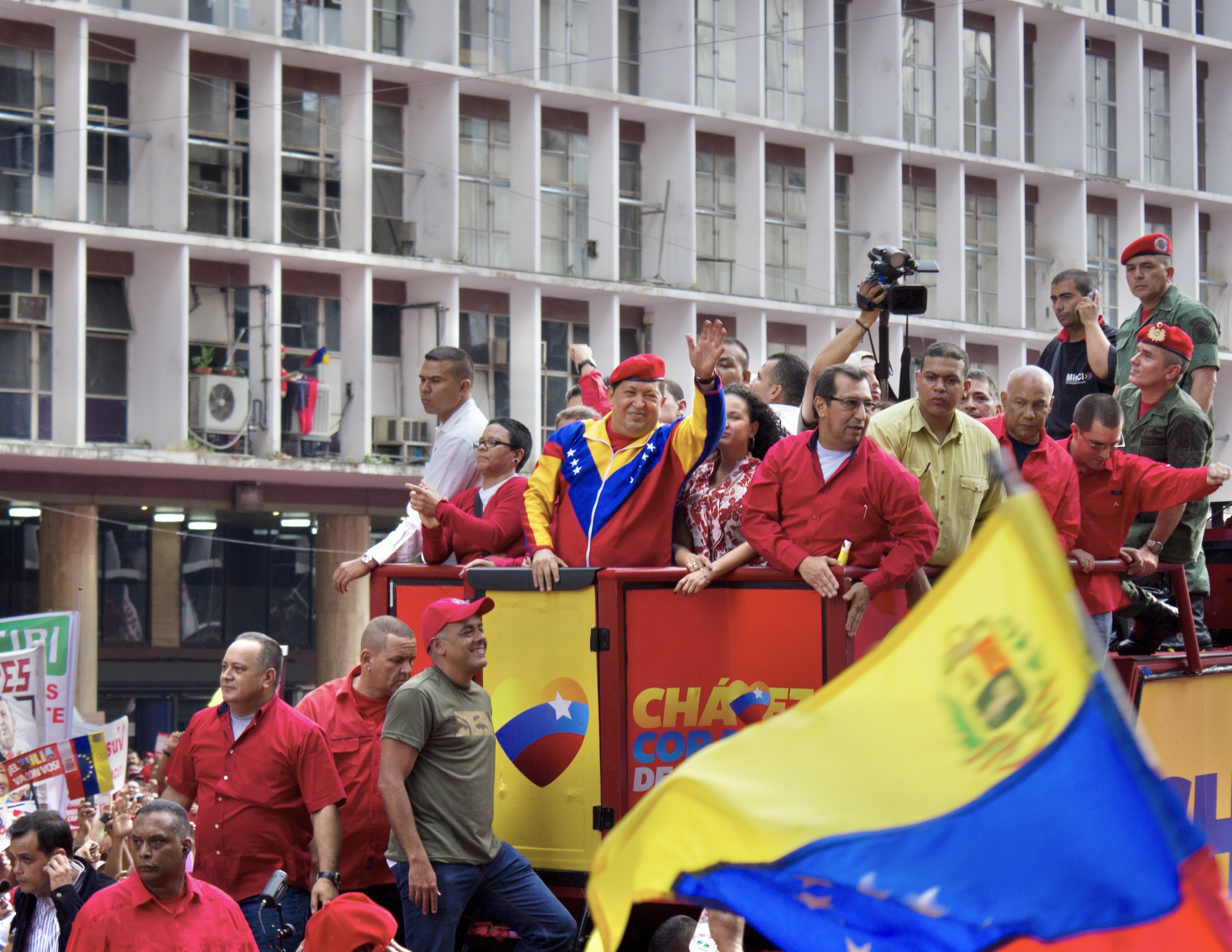
Rodríguez, Hugo Chávez and Diosdado Cabello on 11 June 2012

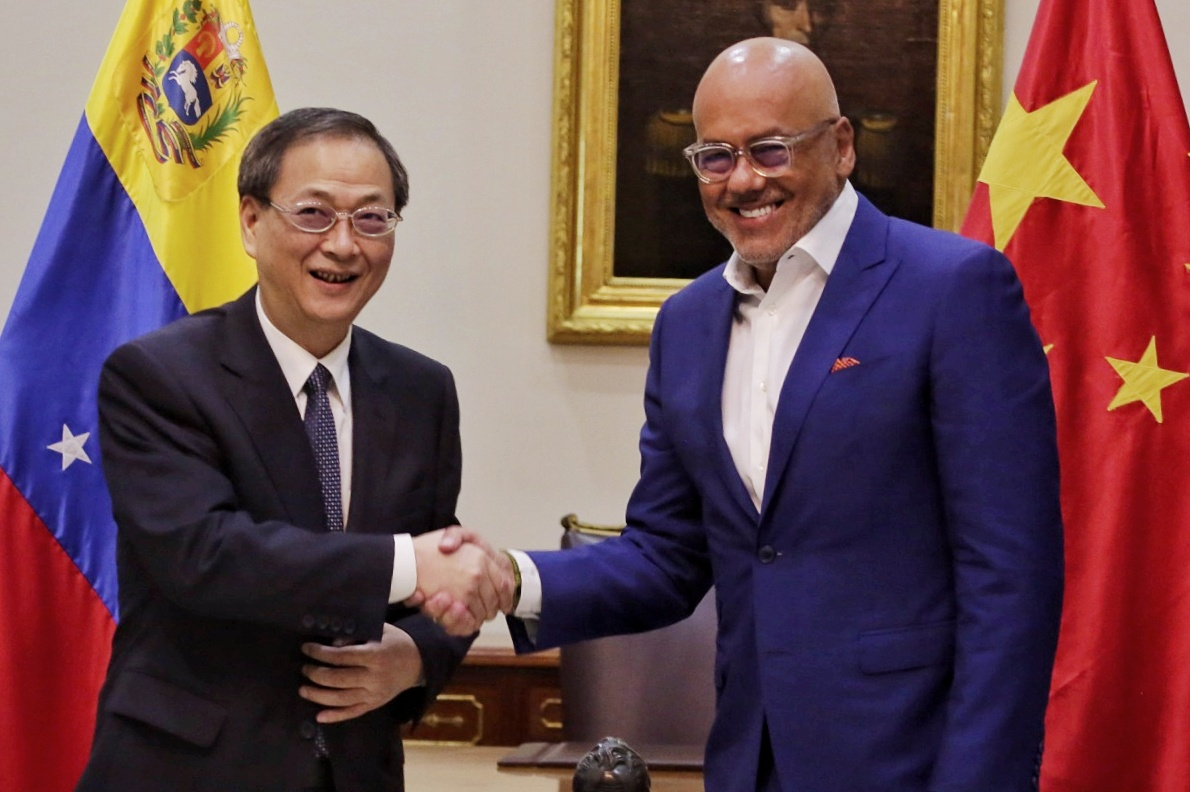
Rodríguez with the Chinese ambassador to Venezuela on 19 January 2023

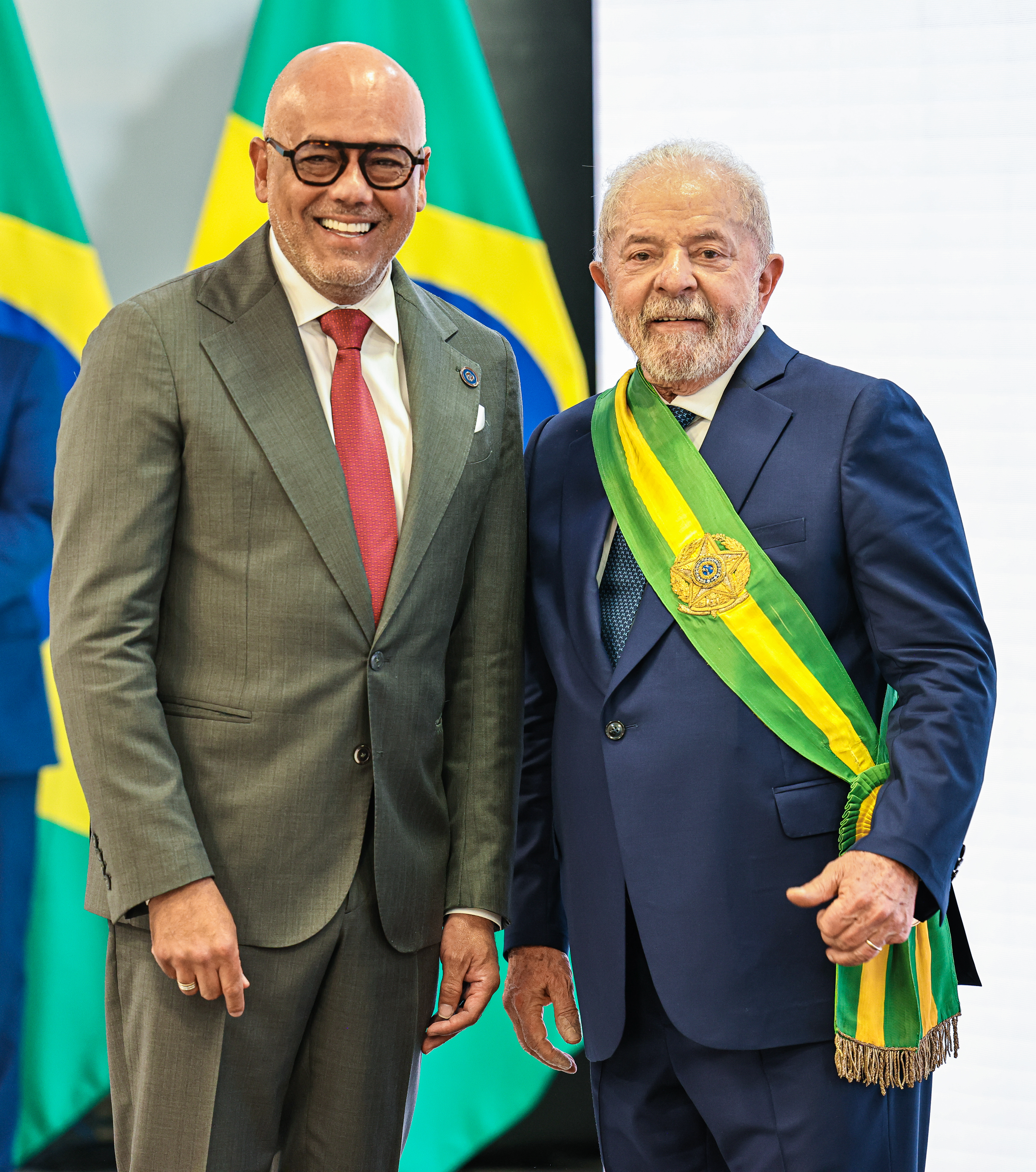
Rodríguez with Brazilian President Luiz Inácio Lula da Silva on 4 January 2023

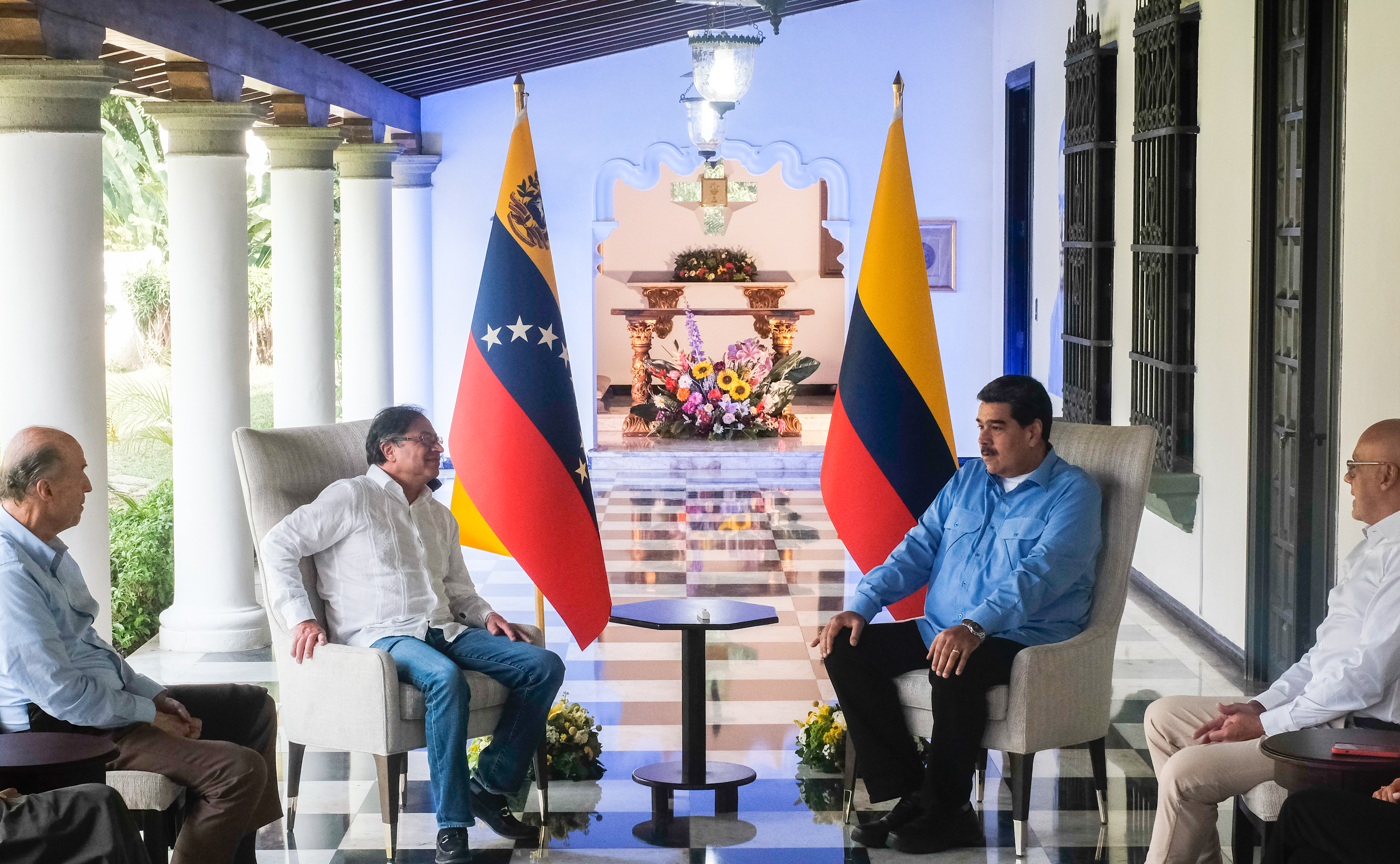
Rodríguez, Venezuelan President Nicolás Maduro and Colombian President Gustavo Petro in Caracas, Venezuela, 23 March 2023

Jorge Jesús Rodríguez Gómez (born 9 November 1965) is a Venezuelan politician serving as President of the National Assembly of Venezuela since 2021. He is the brother of Delcy Rodríguez, the vice president and acting president of Venezuela.

He was vice president of Venezuela under the government of Hugo Chávez from 8 January 2007, to 3 January 2008, rector and president of the National Electoral Council from January 2005 to April 2006, and mayor of Caracas from November 2008 to December 2017. He served as Venezuela’s Minister of Communication and Information under President Nicolás Maduro from November 2017 until 4 September 2020, when he left the position to successfully run in that year’s parliamentary elections in the Capital District.

== Early life ==
Born in Barquisimeto, he is the son of Jorge Antonio Rodríguez, co-founder of the Socialist League (Venezuela), who on 26 February 1976 allegedly participated in the kidnapping of William Niehous, an American businessman and head of operations for Owens-Illinois in Venezuela, claiming that he was linked to the Central Intelligence Agency (CIA), resulting in the longest kidnapping in Venezuela's history, with a duration of 3 years and 4 months. After being captured by officials of the National Directorate of Intelligence and Prevention Services on 23 July 1976, he died 2 days later at the age of 34 due to a heart attack after being brutally tortured during his detention. His sister, Delcy Rodríguez, has also served as a senior official during the Maduro administration. According to El País, Delcy Gómez, mother of Jorge Rodríguez "was marked by that crime. She instilled in her children the obligation to be the best, to conquer power, and to avenge the death of their father".

Rodríguez studied medicine at the Luis Razetti School of the Central University of Venezuela and obtained a specialization in psychiatry at the same institution. He was a resident doctor at the Venezuelan Institute of Social Security (1995); a professor in the Psychiatry postgraduate program at the University Hospital of Caracas and in the community clinical psychology postgraduate program at the Andrés Bello Catholic University, practiced privately, and served as medical director of Residencias Humana (2002). In 1998, he won first prize in the Annual Story Contest organized by the Venezuelan newspaper El Nacional in 1998, with his work Dime cuántos ríos son hechos de tus lágrimas.

== Political career ==
On 3 January 2007, President Hugo Chávez announced that Rodríguez would be the next vice president, replacing José Vicente Rangel. He was sworn in on 8 January, two days before Chávez's swearing in for his next term as president. During his university years, he stood out as a leader of the UCEVISTA student movement. He was president of the Student Center of the "Luis Razetti" School of Medicine (1987) and a year later President of the Federation of University Centers (1988); he was also a member of the so-called "Plancha 80" of the Central University of Venezuela, along with other figures such as Juan Barreto and Anahí Arizmendi.

=== Rector of the National Electoral Council ===
Rodríguez was president of the National Electoral Board, one of the subdivisions of the National Electoral Council (CNE), responsible for technically organizing the presidential recall referendum in 2004. According to El País, Rodríguez’s CNE helped delay the referendum (legally possible since 2003), giving Chávez time to distribute subsidies that were crucial for his victory, which reportedly boosted Rodríguez’s political career.

Subsequently, Rodríguez was appointed president of the same body between January 2005 and April 2006, after the previous CNE president, Francisco Carrasquero, was appointed magistrate of the Supreme Tribunal of Justice by the National Assembly. In 2006, with the appointment of new Electoral Power authorities by the Venezuelan parliament, he left the CNE, working for a time at the government news network Telesur as host of the interview program “Latitud América.” After being part of the electoral authority, he openly declared himself a supporter of President Chávez.

=== Vice President ===
On 3 January 2007, it was announced that he would be appointed Vice President of Venezuela by the newly re-elected President Hugo Chávez Frías, replacing José Vicente Rangel. Rodríguez assumed this position on 8 January 2007, when he was officially sworn in at the Teatro Teresa Carreño. On 9 January, he was also appointed president of the National Organizing Committee (CON) of the Copa América 2007, with the approval of the FVF, replacing Aristóbulo Istúriz, who held that position while serving as Minister of Education and Sports.

In 2007, his name was mentioned in the FBI investigation regarding the Suitcase scandal, which alleges that the operation to cover up the origin and destination of the funds was coordinated with Rodríguez’s office and the Venezuelan Directorate of Intelligence and Prevention Services (DISP). In the Venezuelan context, it is said that people close to Rodríguez allegedly threatened Antonini Wilson to prevent him from revealing information about the funds. One month after the electoral defeat of the 2007 Venezuelan constitutional referendum, Chávez restructured his cabinet, replacing Jorge Rodríguez with Ramón Carrizales as vice president. Chávez stated that Rodríguez would focus exclusively on promoting the emerging United Socialist Party of Venezuela.

=== Coordinator of the United Socialist Party of Venezuela ===
After serving as Vice President of the Republic of Venezuela under the Hugo Chávez's second term, he was appointed on 3 January 2008, to the top role in forming a new party that involved the union of leftist Venezuelan political parties of Chavista tendency to create the United Socialist Party of Venezuela. The President also tasked him with organizing the founding congress and coordinating strategies for future electoral events. Within the internal elections of the organization, he was elected mayoral candidate for the Libertador municipality of Caracas in the regional elections of November 2008, in which he obtained 53% of the votes, replacing his co-member Freddy Bernal.

=== Mayor of Libertador Municipality ===
Rodríguez was mayor of Caracas from 23 November 2008, having been elected with 53% of the votes. On 8 December 2013, Rodríguez was re-elected Mayor of the Libertador Municipality of the Capital District in Venezuela for the 2014-2018 term, against the opposition politician Ismael García, with 54.55% of the votes. The press highlighted that Rodríguez won with a 12% difference with a 59% participation rate when the average voter turnout is 50%. He also hosts the television program La Política en el Diván, which is broadcast every Thursday on Venezolana de Televisión (VTV).

=== President of the National Assembly of Venezuela ===
Rodríguez was elected as president of the National Assembly of Venezuela, after being nominated by the Great Patriotic Pole on 5 January 2021. Rodríguez will direct the first year of the 5th Legislature of the National Assembly, which resulted from elections held on 6 December 2020. The Office of Foreign Assets Control (OFAC) of the United States Department of the Treasury sanctioned Rodríguez for his alleged involvement in acts of corruption and political repression. He was sanctioned by Canada on 22 September 2017 for his alleged role in the erosion of democracy. In 2007, his name was mentioned in the FBI investigation into the Antonini Wilson suitcase case, which alleged that the operation to conceal the origin and destination of the funds was planned in collaboration with Rodríguez’s office and Venezuela’s Directorate of Intelligence and Prevention Services (DISIP). In Venezuela, it was reported that people close to Rodríguez allegedly threatened Antonini Wilson to prevent him from revealing information about the funds.

Jorge Rodríguez Gómez, together with his sister Delcy Rodríguez, the vice president of the Republic, forms an influential duo whose political clout facilitated the rise of a new economic elite around them. Among their main associates are the Abou Nassif brothers, of Lebanese origin, who control a network of companies that prospered thanks to their relationship with the Rodríguez siblings. This network includes businesses in construction, tourism services, real estate, food imports, and packaging. Yussef Abou Nassif, considered Delcy Rodríguez’s romantic partner, has been a key link to power, while Nabil Abou Nassif worked closely with Jorge Rodríguez when he was mayor of Caracas. The Abou Nassif group obtained multimillion-dollar contracts, especially through the Local Committees for Supply and Production (CLAP) program, receiving at least US$413 million between 2017 and 2018, and another €145 million in 2019 for importing hemodialysis kits. The relationship between the Rodríguez siblings and the Abou Nassif brothers was essential for building a business empire that expanded into multiple sectors, leveraging the Rodríguez siblings’ privileged position in the Venezuelan government. Another linked businessman is Majed Khalil Majzoub, identified as a front man for Rodríguez and a beneficiary of electricity and food import contracts.

According to the Financial Times, Rodríguez held talks with the United States government in 2025 to have his sister lead a post-Maduro transitional government, though those talks had included Maduro being allowed to go into exile instead of being captured as he was in the 2026 United States strikes in Venezuela.

== Sanctions ==
Rodríguez has been sanctioned by several countries and is banned from entering neighboring Colombia.

=== Canada ===
On 22 September 2017, Canada sanctioned Rodríguez due to rupture of Venezuela's constitutional order following the 2017 Venezuelan Constituent Assembly election.

=== Colombia ===
In January 2019, Rodríguez was one of over 200 people with a "close relationship and support for the Nicolás Maduro regime", who were banned from entering Colombia.

=== United States ===
The United States sanctioned Rodriguez on 25 September 2018 for his efforts in solidifying President Maduro's power in Venezuela. These sanctions were removed on 14 October 2026.

== See also ==
- President of the National Assembly of Venezuela

Political offices
Preceded by Freddy Bernal	Mayor of Libertador Municipality; 2008–2017	Succeeded by Luis Lira
Preceded by José Vicente Rangel	Vice President of Venezuela; 2007–2008	Succeeded by Ramón Carrizales
