= Carlos Lanz =

Carlos Lanz Rodríguez (1946-2020) was a Venezuelan sociologist and left-wing activist who served as minister of education under the Chávez administration. He participated in the abduction of American businessman William F. Niehous, who remained in custody from 1976 to 1979. Rodríguez was a member of the Armed Forces of National Liberation.

== Murder ==
Rodríguez was murdered in 2020 by a criminal organization, which included his wife, at the age of 74. She was sentenced to 13 years in prison in 2022.
