= Delcy Rodríguez =

President of Venezuela since 2026

Delcy Rodriguez
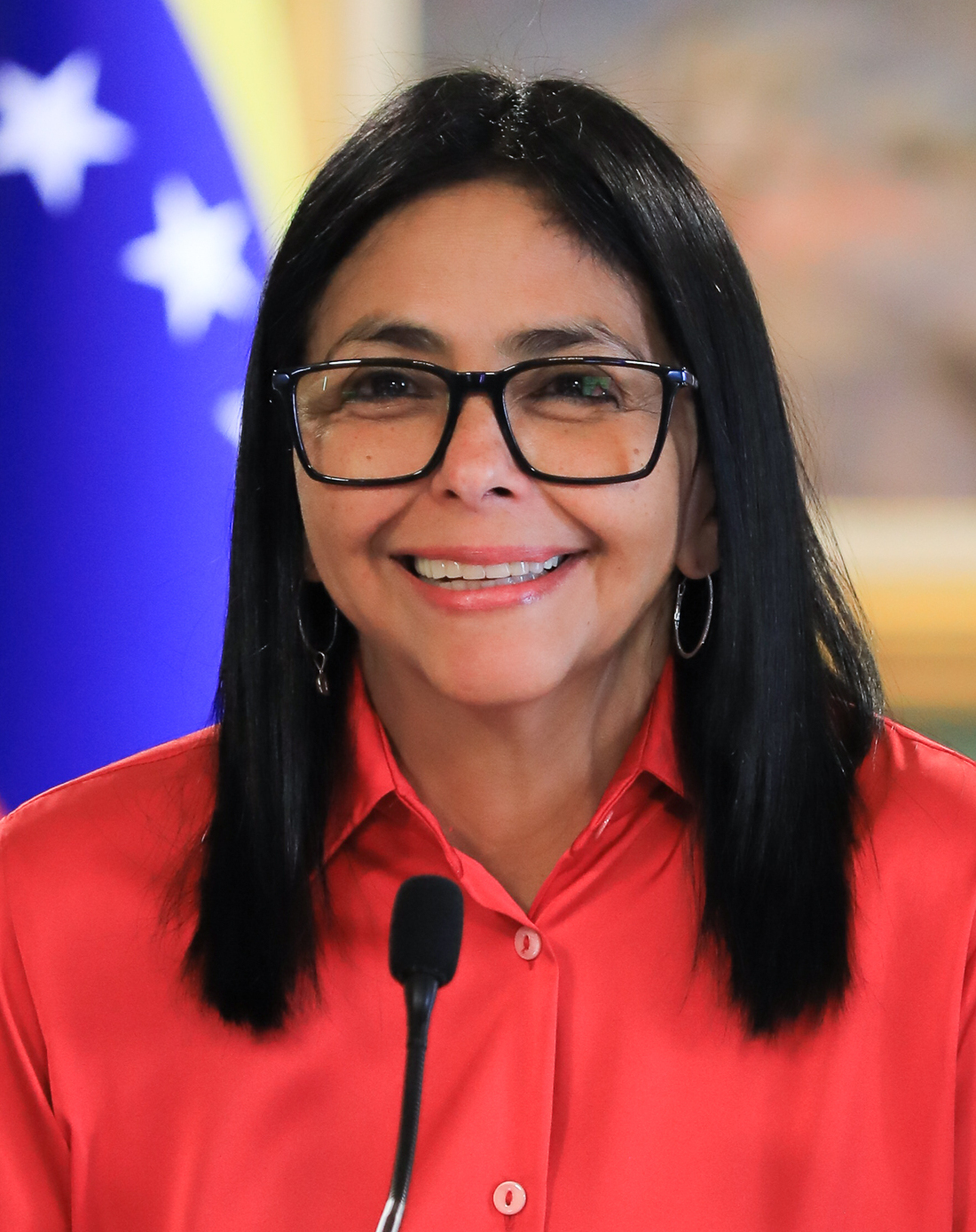
- Rodríguez in 2026

President of Venezuela
- Incumbent
- Assumed office (Note: ad interim); 5 January 2026 (Note: Designated by the Supreme Tribunal of Justice to ensure administrative continuity on 3 January, formally sworn in two days later.)
- Vice President: Herself
- Preceded by: Nicolás Maduro

24th Vice President of Venezuela
- Incumbent
- Assumed office 14 June 2018
- President: Nicolás Maduro; Herself (acting)
- Preceded by: Tareck El Aissami

President of the United Socialist Party of Venezuela
- Incumbent
- Assumed office (Note: ad interim); 5 January 2026
- Preceded by: Nicolás Maduro
Other offices held
Minister of Petroleum and Hydrocarbons
In office 27 August 2024 – 11 March 2026
President	Nicolás Maduro; Herself (acting)
Preceded by	Pedro Tellechea
Succeeded by	Paula Henao
Minister of Economy and Finance
In office 10 September 2020 – 27 August 2024
President	Nicolás Maduro
Preceded by	Simón Zerpa
Succeeded by	Anabel Pereira Fernández
President of the Constituent National Assembly
In office 4 August 2017 – 14 June 2018
President	Nicolás Maduro
Preceded by	Position re-established; Luis Miquilena (1999)
Succeeded by	Diosdado Cabello
Minister of Foreign Affairs
In office 26 December 2014 – 21 June 2017
President	Nicolás Maduro
Preceded by	Rafael Ramírez
Succeeded by	Samuel Moncada
Minister of Popular Power for Communication and Information
In office 3 August 2013 – 13 October 2014
President	Nicolás Maduro
Preceded by	Ernesto Villegas
Succeeded by	Jacqueline Faría
Minister for Presidential Affairs
In office February 2006 – August 2006
President	Hugo Chávez
Preceded by	Haiman El Troudi
Succeeded by	Adán Chávez

Personal details
- Born: Delcy Eloína Rodríguez Gómez; 18 May 1969 (age 57) Caracas, Venezuela
- Party: United Socialist Party of Venezuela (2012–2018, 2018–present)
- Other political affiliations: We Are Venezuela Movement (2018)
- Domestic partners: Fernando Carrillo (2004–2007); Yussef Abou Nassif Smaili (2017–2026)
- Parents: Jorge Antonio Rodríguez; Delcy Gómez
- Relatives: Jorge Rodríguez (brother)
- Education: Central University of Venezuela (Lic.); Birkbeck, University of London (MS)
- Occupation: Politician; diplomat
- Profession: Lawyer
- Website: Presidential website (in Spanish)

Delcy Eloína Rodríguez Gómez (Note: Latin American Spanish pronunciation: [ˈdelsi eloˈina ro'ðɾiɣes ˈɣomes].) (born 18 May 1969) is a Venezuelan lawyer, politician, and diplomat who has been the interim president of Venezuela since 2026, following the U.S. raid which led to the capture of Nicolás Maduro. She is the first woman in Venezuelan history to perform the duties of the presidency. A member of the United Socialist Party of Venezuela (PSUV), Rodríguez served as the 24th vice president under Maduro's government since 2018.

The daughter of guerilla leader and politician Jorge Antonio Rodríguez, Rodríguez was born and raised in Caracas. When she was seven years old, her father was murdered while in custody of the DISIP. In 1993, Rodríguez graduated from the Central University of Venezuela (UCV) with a Bachelor of Laws' degree. During her time there, Rodríguez was a student leader and activist. She then studied labor law in Sorbonne University in Paris and social policy in Birkbeck, University of London, but did not graduate from either of them.

In 2002, following the failed coup attempt against then-president Hugo Chávez, Rodriguez along with her elder brother Jorge entered politics. In 2006, President Chávez appointed Rodríguez Minister for Presidential Affairs, serving in this post for around six months. In 2013, following the death of Chávez, Maduro became president and appointed Rodríguez Minister of Popular Power for Communication and Information. In 2014, Rodríguez was appointed Minister of Foreign Affairs and served in this role until 2017, where she was appointed President of the Constituent National Assembly of Venezuela following the Constituent Assembly election. In June of the following year, President Maduro appointed Rodríguez vice president. During her tenure in the role, Rodríguez also served as Minister of Economy and Finance from 2020 to 2024, and as Minister of Petroleum and Hydrocarbons from 2024.

On 3 January 2026, the United States carried out strikes in Venezuela and arrested President Maduro on drug trafficking charges. Rodríguez was officially sworn in as acting president on 5 January, thus becoming the first woman to exercise the powers of the presidency in Venezuelan history. Despite Maduro's de facto removal from power, both he and Rodríguez claim that he remains the legal officeholder.

According to The New York Times, Venezuela under the Rodríguez administration has been a de facto puppet state since the intervention, with the US State Department under Marco Rubio exercising control over core aspects of Venezuela's governance, including its domestic finances, government appointments, revenues, foreign policy, and the distribution of its natural resources. Under the Rodríguez government, Venezuela is in a period of conflicting directives following the end of Nicolás Maduro's regime that existed in 2017–2026, characterized by a mass political prisoner release, the privatization of Petróleos de Venezuela, and renewed transition talks with the opposition. However, Brookings highlighted the extreme unlikeliness of lasting regime change, and expressed doubt the US objective was democratization. Instead, it focused on American influence over Venezuela's oil resources, and hindering Venezuela-Cuba relations as expectancies for her tenure.

== Early life ==
Rodríguez was born on 18 May 1969, in Caracas, and is the sister of Jorge Rodríguez Gómez, a psychiatrist serving as President of the National Assembly of Venezuela since 2021. Her father, Jorge Antonio Rodríguez, was a founder of the Socialist League, a Marxist political party in Venezuela. Her mother is Delcy Gómez. Rodríguez's father was murdered in 1976, while he was incarcerated and being tortured by the Directorate of Intelligence and Prevention Services (DISIP) for his leadership role in the kidnapping of American executive and alleged CIA spy William Niehous.

According to The Washington Post, a person who had held repeated conversations with Rodríguez stated that Rodríguez had lived in Santa Monica, California during her college years. Rodríguez graduated with a law degree from the Central University of Venezuela (UCV) in 1993. During her time at UCV, Rodríguez was active as a student leader. She then studied labor law at Sorbonne University in Paris, but did not graduate. In her professional career, Rodríguez served as a professor at UCV. She was president of the union within the Venezuelan Association of Labor Lawyers.

== Political career ==
Rodríguez became involved in national politics during the 2002 Venezuelan coup attempt. She has stated that her decision to enter politics was motivated by revenge for the death of her father while in the custody of pro-American intelligence agents. While in London during the crisis, she and her mother symbolically took over the Venezuelan Embassy in London to protest the de facto government of Pedro Carmona. From there, they coordinated interviews with international media, including the BBC and CNN, to denounce the rupture of the constitutional order. Rodríguez commenced her governmental career in 2003, joining the General Coordination of the Vice Presidency of the Bolivarian Republic of Venezuela. She subsequently became Director of International Affairs at the Ministry of Energy and Mines. In 2005, Rodríguez was appointed Vice-minister for European Affairs.

From February to August 2006, Rodríguez was the Minister for Presidential Affairs. Her tenure was short-lived due to reported tensions with president Hugo Chávez. She reportedly refused to show the "personal homage" expected by the president. According to profiles published in Tal Cual and El Estímulo, Rodríguez disregarded established hierarchies and maintained a direct attitude that alienated her from the presidential inner circle. Travelling to an official visit to Moscow in 2006, it was reported that Rodríguez engaged in a heated argument with Chávez and swore at him; Chávez dismissed her, and she had to return immediately to Venezuela. In 2007, Rodríguez served as the General Coordinator to the Vice-President of Venezuela, both of which roles she held while her brother occupied the office of Vice President of the Republic. In August 2013, President Nicolás Maduro appointed her as the Minister of Popular Power for Communication and Information of Venezuela, a position in which she was reaffirmed in 2014 and maintained until October 2014.

=== Minister of Foreign Affairs ===
In December 2014, President Maduro appointed Rodríguez as the Minister of Popular Power for Foreign Relations, also known as Chancellor, succeeding Rafael Ramírez Carreño. Rodríguez became the first woman to hold this position in Venezuela's history. In December 2015, in the absence of President Maduro, Rodríguez attended the 49th Summit of Mercosur heads of state in Asunción. During this summit, Rodríguez was involved in a dispute with the president of Argentina, Mauricio Macri, who called for the prompt release of political prisoners in Venezuela. Rodríguez accused Macri of meddling in Venezuelan internal affairs, of endorsing political violence against Chavismo, and of criticizing Hebe de Bonafini, the head of Madres de Plaza de Mayo, for advocating peaceful protests against his government. Rodríguez accused Macri of releasing officials responsible for torture during Argentina's last military dictatorship and vetoing human rights laws, claims that the newspaper Clarín characterized as factual errors. President Maduro later praised Rodríguez publicly for metaphorically "sending Macri to the showers" during the summit.

During the same summit, Rodríguez presented photographs depicting Leopoldo López and opposition protestors attacking public buildings. She said the images, sourced from news agencies, evidenced López's responsibility for "attacks against essential public services and Venezuelan universities". Rodríguez alleged Macri had released prisoners who were responsible for repression during the last military dictatorship in Argentina and had vetoed laws aimed at addressing unfair treatment, torture, and forced disappearances. These allegations were denied by the Argentine Foreign Minister, Susana Malcorra, during a press conference. Malcorra stated that Rodríguez's accusations were incorrect and that President Macri deemed a response unnecessary. She criticized Rodríguez's remarks as overly aggressive and based on inaccurate information.

In 2016, Rodríguez accused Luis Almagro, the Secretary General of the Organization of American States (OAS) of "international bullying" because of his attempt to suspend Venezuela from the OAS. In March 2016, within the framework of an Organization of American States (OAS) assembly, Rodríguez denounced a report published by Luis Almagro. She characterized the report as part of a "complex intervention strategy with medium and long-term consequences". Rodríguez informed the assembly that over 70% of Almagro's tweets were focused on criticizing the Venezuelan government and its citizens.

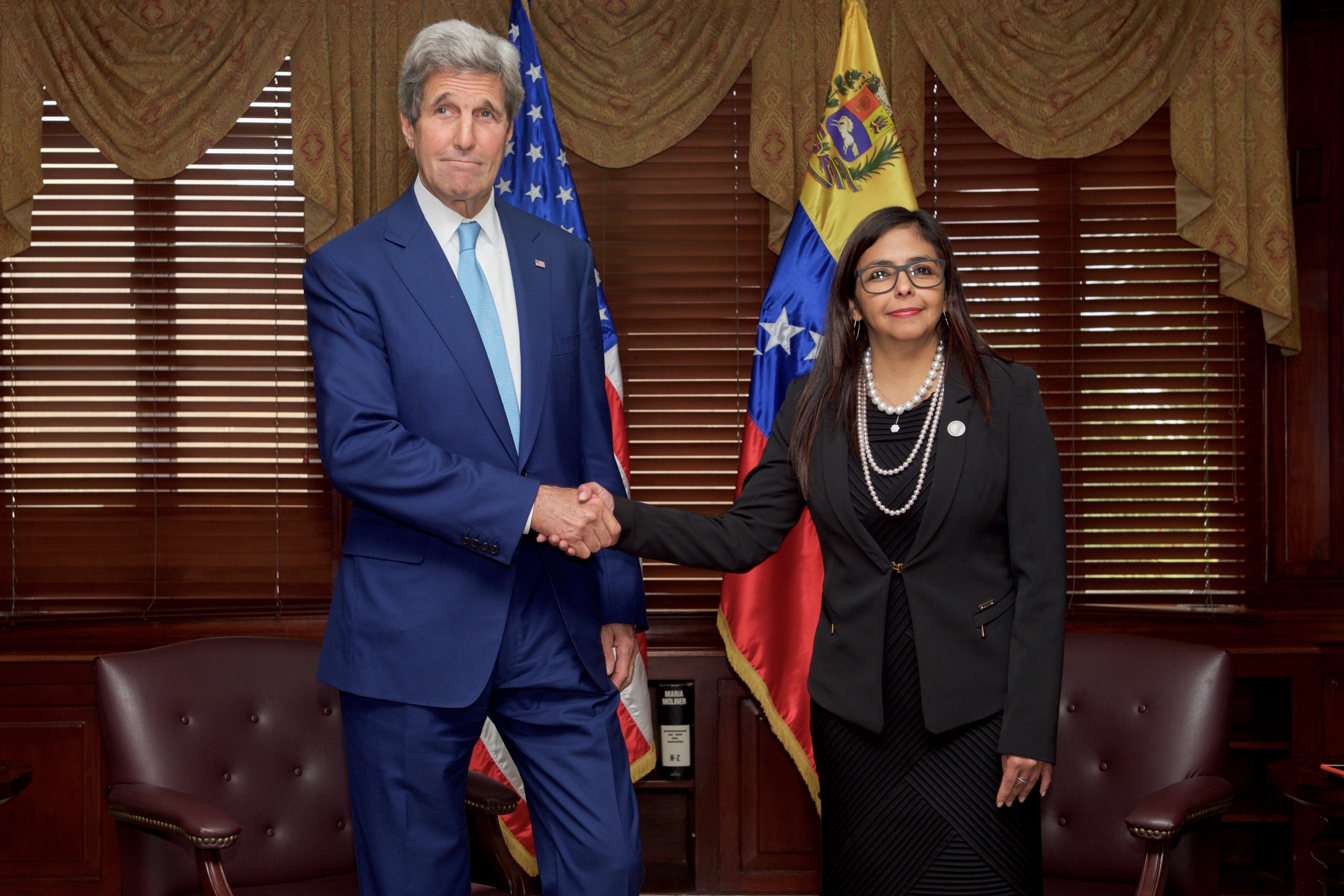
Rodríguez shaking hands with United States Secretary of State John Kerry on 14 June 2016

In June 2016, during the commemoration of the 195th anniversary of the Battle of Carabobo, President Maduro awarded Rodríguez the Military Order of National Defense, Commander Degree, First Class. This honor was bestowed upon her for "defending the interests of the nation in the face of attacks from the right". At the XXV Ibero-American Summit of Heads of State and Government, which took place in Cartagena de Indias, Colombia, Rodríguez addressed the President of Peru, Pedro Pablo Kuczynski. In criticism, she asked for the president to "see more of the reality of the people of Latin America".

Brazil, Argentina, and Paraguay convened to deliberate on the suspension of Venezuela from Mercosur. The trio expressed reservations regarding Venezuela's compliance with the prerequisites for full membership within the bloc, emphasizing the need for adherence to Mercosur's stipulations, particularly in the areas of trade, politics, democracy, and human rights. Concurrently, Argentina assumed the pro tempore presidency of Mercosur. Despite this, Venezuela did not acknowledge its suspension from the trade bloc and sought to continue its exercise of the pro tempore presidency until 30 December 2016.

In December 2016, after Venezuela was suspended from Mercosur, Rodríguez attempted to force her entry into a bloc meeting in Buenos Aires to which she had not been invited. Accompanied by Bolivian foreign minister David Choquehuanca, she tried to enter the San Martín Palace but was blocked by riot police. Rodríguez claimed she was "struck" by police during the scuffle, and reports indicated a doctor had to immobilize her arm. Although she eventually gained access to the building, she found the meeting room empty as the other foreign ministers had decided to move their gathering to a different location.

In June 2017, Rodríguez vacated her role as Chancellor to stand as a candidate in the National Constituent Assembly elections held that year. Prior to her candidacy, she had been designated a member of the Presidential Commission for the Constituent Assembly. Before she left her position, President Maduro honored her on 22 June with the Saber Order of the Liberator Simón Bolívar of the Battle of Carabobo. She was succeeded by Samuel Moncada.

=== President of the Constituent Assembly ===
In July 2017, Rodríguez was elected as a deputy for Caracas to the National Constituent Assembly (ANC). Upon the ANC's establishment in August 2017, in the Federal Legislative Palace, she was chosen as its president. In January 2018, President Maduro announced Rodríguez as the president of a then-to-be-legalized political entity, the Somos Venezuela Movement (MSV). In February 2018, Rodríguez resigned from the United Socialist Party of Venezuela (PSUV) and joined the ranks of the MSV, adhering to statutes prohibiting dual membership in political organizations within the country. In October 2018, she re-entered the PSUV as a member.

=== Vice President ===
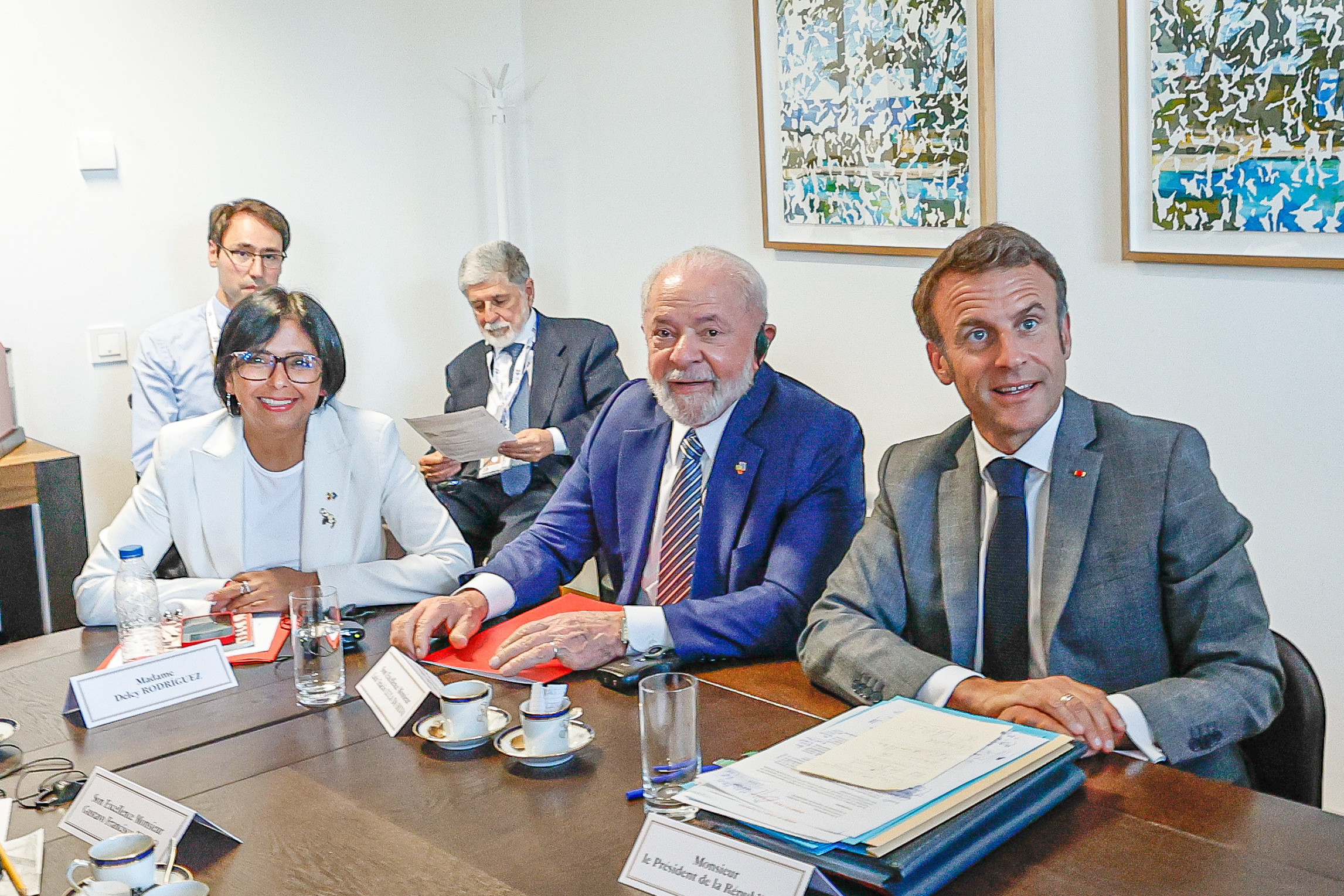
Rodríguez with Brazilian President Luiz Inácio Lula da Silva and French President Emmanuel Macron at the 3rd EU–CELAC summit in Brussels, Belgium, 17 July 2023

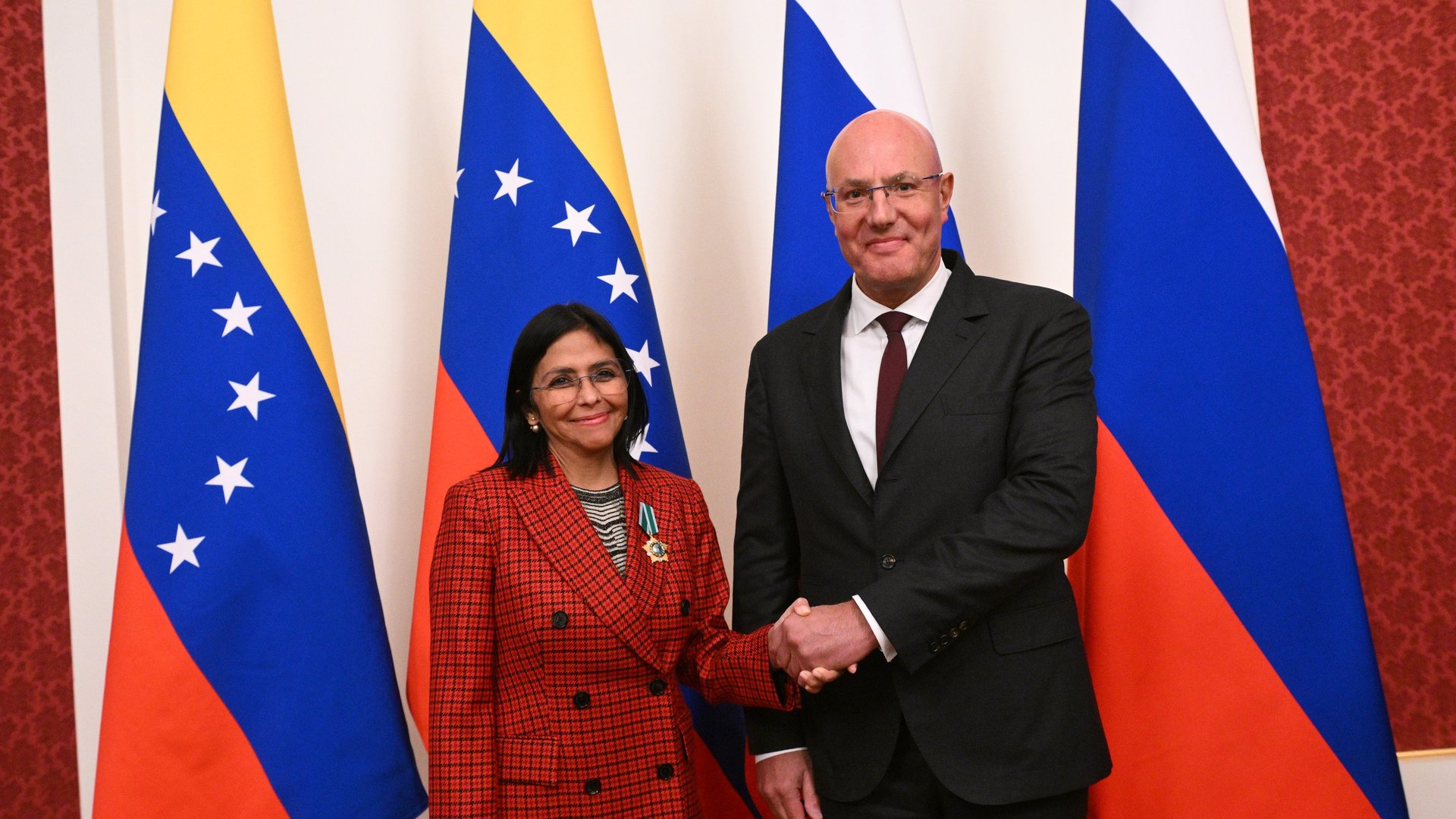
Rodríguez with Russian Deputy Prime Minister Dmitry Chernyshenko in Moscow, Russia, 26 September 2024

On 14 June 2018, President Maduro appointed Rodríguez as the Vice President of Venezuela, succeeding Tareck El Aissami. She also became the head official of the Bolivarian Intelligence Service (SEBIN), Venezuela's intelligence agency, as it is dependent on the office of the vice presidency. During Rodríguez's time as head of SEBIN, the United Nations found the agency had committed crimes against humanity with the intent of crushing political dissent. In December 2018, Rodríguez welcomed the President of Turkey, Recep Tayyip Erdoğan, during his official visit to Venezuela. In November 2022, she visited the Sheikh Zayed Grand Mosque in Abu Dhabi.

Reporting from late 2025 suggests she established private communication channels with international intermediaries. Analysts point to a clandestine meeting on the island of Bonaire in November 2025 as a pivotal moment where she reportedly discussed "stabilization protocols" for Venezuela's energy sector in the event of a power vacuum.

=== Minister of Economy and Finance ===
From 10 September 2020 to 27 August 2024, Rodríguez served as the Minister of Economy and Finance, having been appointed to this position by President Maduro. In July 2021, Rodríguez participated in the Annual Assembly of Fedecámaras, marking the first instance in two decades that a high-ranking official from the national executive attended this event, which convenes leaders from the country's main corporations. Rodríguez highlighted the significance of private sector engagement in unlocking Venezuela's productive capacity but urged the business community in attendance to refrain from political involvement. Fedecámaras has historically been viewed by Chavismo as part of the opposition, often being described as the "parasitic bourgeoisie".

=== Capture of Nicolás Maduro and aftermath ===
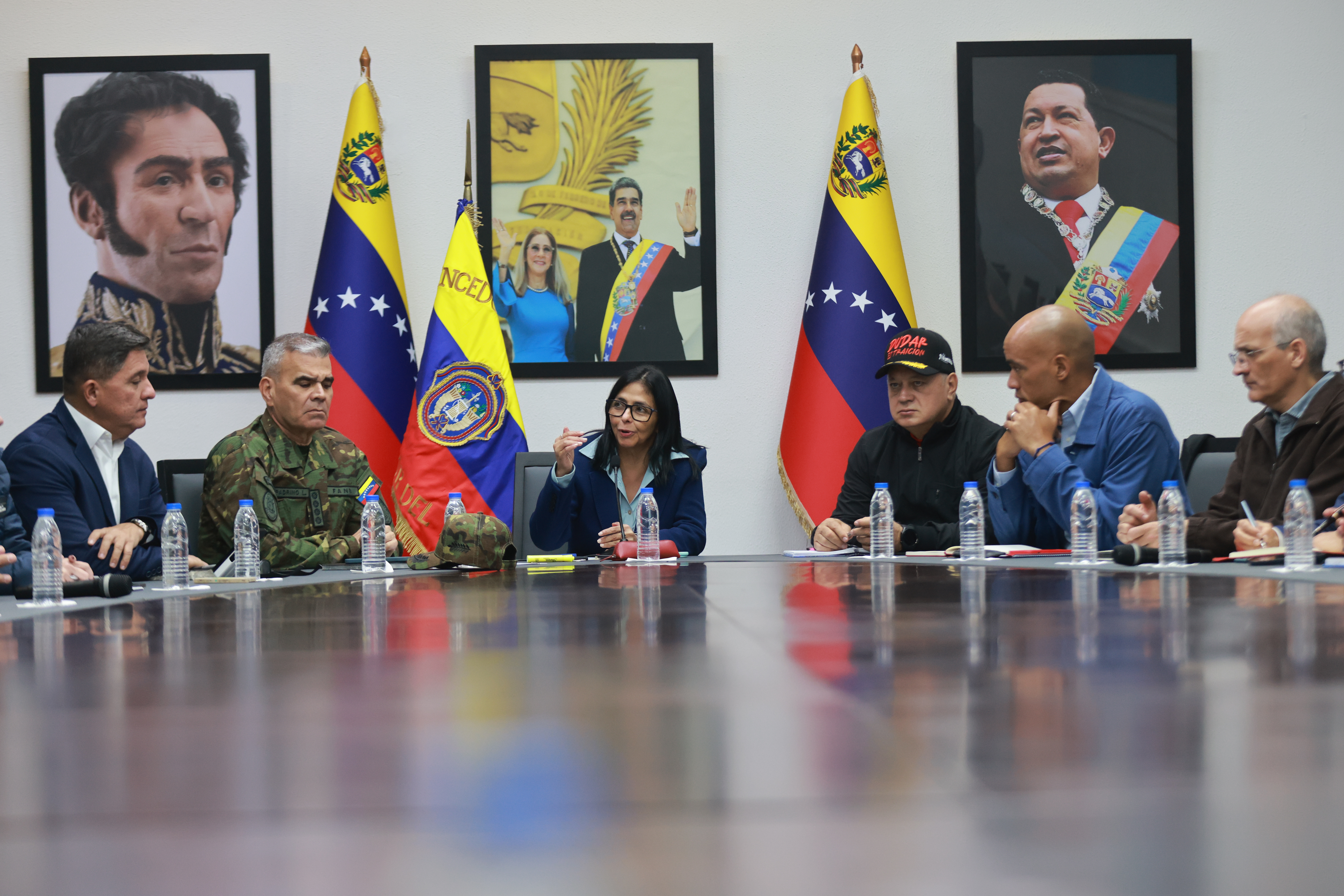
Rodríguez presiding over her first Council of Ministers meeting at Miraflores Palace on 4 January 2026

On 3 January 2026, at approximately 2:00 AM VET, the United States carried out several strikes in Venezuela, including the capital of Caracas, and detained President Maduro and transported him to New York City. Vice President Rodríguez was granted presidential powers under Article 233 of the Venezuelan Constitution, which states that the vice president takes charge if there is a presidential vacancy. Rodríguez initially demanded proof that Maduro was still alive. US President Donald Trump announced that Secretary of State Marco Rubio had made contact with Rodríguez and that she had been "sworn in" as president. Trump further stated that Rodríguez told Rubio that she would do "whatever the US asks", adding that she was gracious but "really doesn't have a choice".

According to The New York Times, Vice President Rodríguez had earned the respect of American officials due to increasing Venezuela's oil production and stabilizing its economy, despite harsher US sanctions. Rodríguez has also gained a reputation among both Venezuelan and foreign business leaders as a technocrat. According to the Financial Times, Delcy Rodríguez's brother Jorge Rodríguez, had held talks with the United States government in 2025 to have his sister lead a post-Maduro transitional government, although those talks had included Maduro being allowed to go into exile instead of being captured. The Venezuelan military announced it would recognize Rodríguez as acting president and called for a return to normalcy. She also received a pledge of loyalty from Assemblyman Nicolás Maduro Guerra, the president's son.

On 3 January 2026, the day of Maduro's capture, the Venezuelan government declared a state of emergency (estado de conmoción) that suspended constitutional guarantees and authorized the detention without judicial warrant of individuals expressing support for the military operation.

== Interim president of Venezuela (since 2026) ==
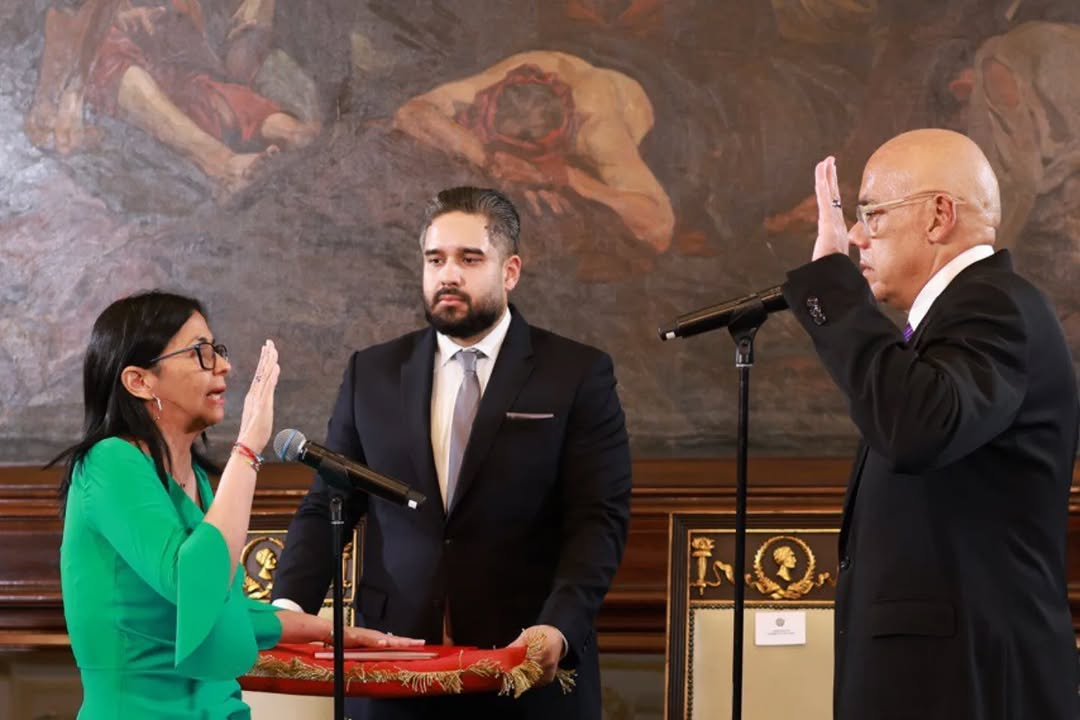
Rodríguez taking the oath of office administered by her brother and President of the National Assembly Jorge Rodríguez, 5 January 2026

On 3 January, the Constitutional Chamber of the Supreme Tribunal of Justice ordered Rodríguez to "assume and exercise, as acting president, all the powers, duties, and faculties inherent to the office of President of the Bolivarian Republic of Venezuela, in order to guarantee administrative continuity and the comprehensive defense of the nation."

The Supreme Tribunal based its decision on an expansive interpretation of constitutional provisions concerning the continuity of the state and the role of the executive vice president. According to the ruling, the capture of President Nicolás Maduro constituted an extraordinary situation that could not immediately be considered an absolute absence from office, as it did not involve resignation, death, removal, or a declaration of permanent incapacity.

The court held that there was a temporary inability to exercise the office of president, that the state had to preserve its regular functioning, and that the executive vice president was the highest-ranking administrative official available to assume executive authority on a provisional basis. Consequently, the court authorized Rodríguez, in her capacity as executive vice president, to assume the functions of acting president without initially establishing a fixed term for the exercise of the office.

Speaking at the European Commission, spokesperson Anitta Hipper announced on 5 January 2026 that the European Union does not recognize the legitimacy of Rodríguez as the country's acting head of government.

=== First speech and inauguration ===
Appearing on Venezolana de Televisión, Rodríguez described Maduro as Venezuela's "only president" in contrast to Trump's statements. During the broadcast she called for calm and unity to defend the country while Maduro remained under US detention, and stated that Venezuela would never ‌be the colony of any nation. Rodríguez also stated that "governments around the world are shocked that the Bolivarian Republic of Venezuela has become the victim and target of an attack of this nature, which undoubtedly has Zionist undertones".

Rodríguez was sworn in as acting president on 5 January 2026 by her brother, Jorge Rodríguez, the president of the National Assembly of Venezuela. She announced a week of national mourning for the people killed during the American strike.

On the day of the presidential inauguration, armed colectivos were deployed in the streets. Fourteen journalists were detained during the events. They were later released without being formally presented before a court, while journalist Stefano Pozzebon of CNN was deported from Venezuela.

=== Restart of diplomatic relations with the United States ===
On 8 January, her government released nine foreign and Venezuelan political prisoners. Donald Trump announced that he had cancelled a second wave of attacks due to this gesture of cooperation. The United States and the Rodríguez government have begun discussions to restart diplomatic relations and to possibly reopen the U.S. embassy in Venezuela, closed since 2019.

On 16 January, Rodríguez met with the U.S. Central Intelligence Agency (CIA) director John Ratcliffe in Caracas to discuss intelligence cooperation, economic stability and actions against drug traffickers. On 13 February, she met with a delegation led by the U.S. Energy Secretary Chris Wright, and the two sides discussed cooperation in the energy sector.

On 12 March, the United States formally recognized Rodríguez's authority. On 30 March, the US embassy in Venezuela formally resumed operations after being closed for seven years.

=== Missions ===
In early 2026, Rodríguez also issued decrees eliminating or restructuring several Bolivarian social programs created under Hugo Chávez and Nicolás Maduro. At least seven missions and foundations, including the New Frontier for Peace Socialist Mission Foundation, were dismantled or reorganized.

=== Amnesty law and release of political prisoners ===
On 30 January 2026, Rodríguez announced and signed the Amnesty Law for Democratic Coexistence, granting amnesty for political offenses and politically motivated acts of violence committed since 1999. With the law in place, Venezuela has effectively acknowledged that the government has held political prisoners.

=== Energy policy ===
President Rodríguez alongside Donald Trump during a UN assembly in September 2026.

On 6 January 2026, U.S. President Donald Trump stated that Venezuela's "interim authorities" would deliver between 30 and 50 million barrels of oil to the United States and that the proceeds from the operation would remain under U.S. control, presenting it as part of the post-transition energy framework. On 7 January, PDVSA confirmed that it was "conducting negotiations with the United States for the sale of oil volumes" and stated that the arrangement would be a "strictly commercial" transaction conducted under legal criteria, without publicly confirming the specific figure mentioned by Trump.

On 20 January 2026, Rodríguez announced that $300 million had been received from the first U.S.-facilitated sales of Venezuelan crude oil. The payment was part of a $500 million oil export agreement between Venezuela and the United States.

On 29 January 2026, Rodríguez signed a reform to the Organic Law on Hydrocarbons, approved by the National Assembly, that liberalized the regulatory framework governing Venezuela's oil sector. The reform ended the monopoly of the state oil company PDVSA over oil production and sales, allowing private domestic and foreign companies to manage production and commercialization activities, facilitating greater foreign participation and investment in the sector. It reduced certain fiscal and administrative burdens on operating companies and granted expanded powers to the Ministry of Petroleum to authorize partnership arrangements and contracts with international firms. The government presented the measure as part of a strategy to accelerate the recovery of oil production, attract foreign investment, and revive Venezuela's energy industry after years of declining output.

On 9 November 2026, ExxonMobil signed a non-binding memorandum of understanding with Venezuela's state oil company PDVSA to evaluate potential upstream oil opportunities, marking a prospective return to the country nearly two decades after its assets were expropriated under former President Hugo Chávez. The preliminary agreement does not commit ExxonMobil to specific projects and requires a final joint-venture or production-sharing contract prior to any exploration or production. During a televised signing ceremony, Delcy Rodríguez welcomed the company's return and expressed hope that the memorandum would lead to concrete agreements.

=== Health policy ===
On 14 January 2026, Rodríguez launched the Plan por la Salud y la Vida ("Health and Life Plan") to strengthen primary health care services. Under the initiative, oil and gas revenues are pledged to fund public health needs, including the opening of 75 new health centers, alliances with private clinics to clear surgical backlogs, and expanded mental health programs. Additionally, officials confirmed guaranteed vaccine and medication inventories for 2026 supported by domestic pharmaceutical laboratories, as well as uninterrupted dialysis treatments secured through donations from Brazil.

=== Education policy ===
On 7 April 2026, the government implemented a plan that restored 1,700 schools throughout the country.

=== Ease of sanctions ===
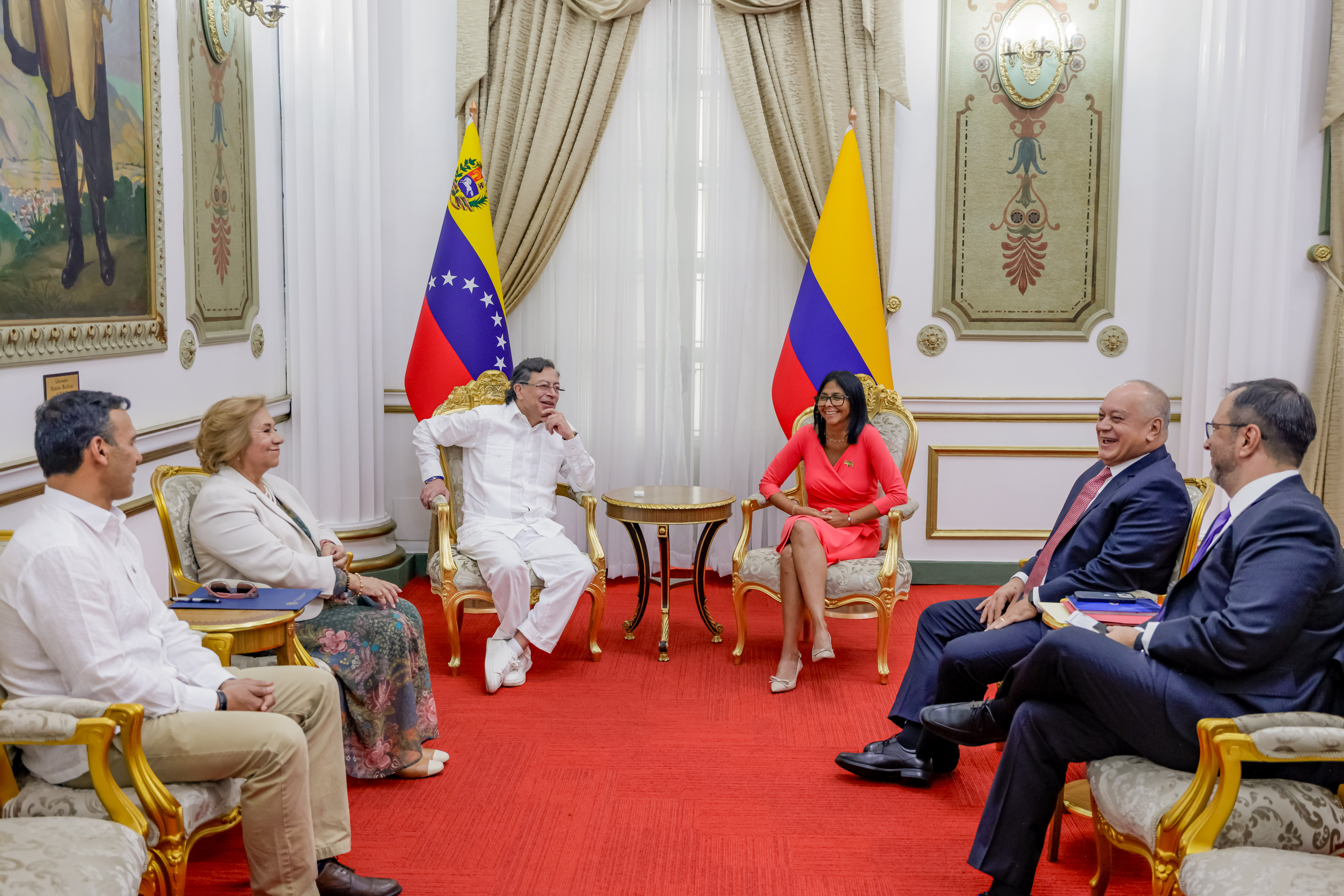
Rodríguez with president of Colombia Gustavo Petro, 24 April 2026

In early 2026, the United States Department of the Treasury partially eased sanctions on Venezuela’s energy sector through new OFAC general licenses (including GL 46). These measures allowed certain transactions involving Venezuelan oil and coincided with the country’s oil-sector reforms.

=== Foreign visits ===
As acting president, Rodríguez undertook her first overseas visits to Grenada on 9–10 April 2026 and Barbados on 27 April 2026. In May 2026, Rodríguez travelled to The Hague to represent Venezuela in the ongoing dispute between Venezuela and Guyana over the region of Essequibo. On 4 June 2026, she paid a state visit to India, meeting with Prime Minister Narendra Modi in New Delhi. On 11 June 2026, she made an official working visit to Türkiye with a meeting held in Istanbul with President Recep Tayyip Erdoğan. Rodríguez made another international trip on 10 September 2026, when she flew to neighbouring Suriname and met with President Jennifer Geerlings-Simons to discuss agreements on oil, gas and hydrocarbons. Rodríguez attended the general debate of the eighty-first session of the United Nations General Assembly in New York City and met President Donald Trump there. On 22 September, she met with President Donald Trump in New York. On 15–16 November 2026, Delcy Rodríguez conducted an official visit to the United Arab Emirates, following stops in Qatar and at COP31 in Turkey, to meet with senior Emirati officials, including President Sheikh Mohamed bin Zayed Al Nahyan, and lead bilateral business talks. Accompanied by key economic, foreign affairs, and energy ministers, Rodríguez aimed to attract foreign investment, expand trade in the energy, tourism, and aviation sectors.

== Sanctions ==
Rodríguez has been sanctioned by several countries. The government of neighboring Colombia included her on a list of people banned from entering Colombia, along with (as of 2019) approximately 200 other Maduro government supporters and associates. In September 2017, Canada sanctioned Rodríguez for her role in Venezuela's constitutional crisis. In June 2018, shortly after being named Vice President of Venezuela, Rodríguez was one of eleven Venezuelan officials sanctioned by the European Union, with her assets frozen and a travel ban issued against her for "undermin[ing] democracy and the rule of law in Venezuela".

In April 2018, the Mexican Senate approved a Point of Agreement that, among other things, rejected the presidential elections scheduled for 20 May. The Senate froze the assets of officials of the Maduro administration, including Rodríguez, and prohibited them from entering Mexico. In July 2018, Switzerland sanctioned Rodríguez, freezing her assets and imposing a travel ban, citing the same reasons as the European Union. In September 2018, the United States sanctioned Rodríguez for "corruption and humanitarian issues" by including her in OFAC's Specially Designated Nationals and Blocked Persons List.

After her ascension to the acting presidency, her cabinet contacted the European Commission to request the lifting of sanctions placed on her by the European Union for allegedly persecuting the opposition and undermining the rule of law. The Commission has yet to respond.

In February 2026, EU foreign policy chief Kaja Kallas, stated that she had accepted Spain's request and would propose lifting sanctions against Delcy Rodríguez, who was serving as the acting leader of Venezuela.

=== Delcygate ===
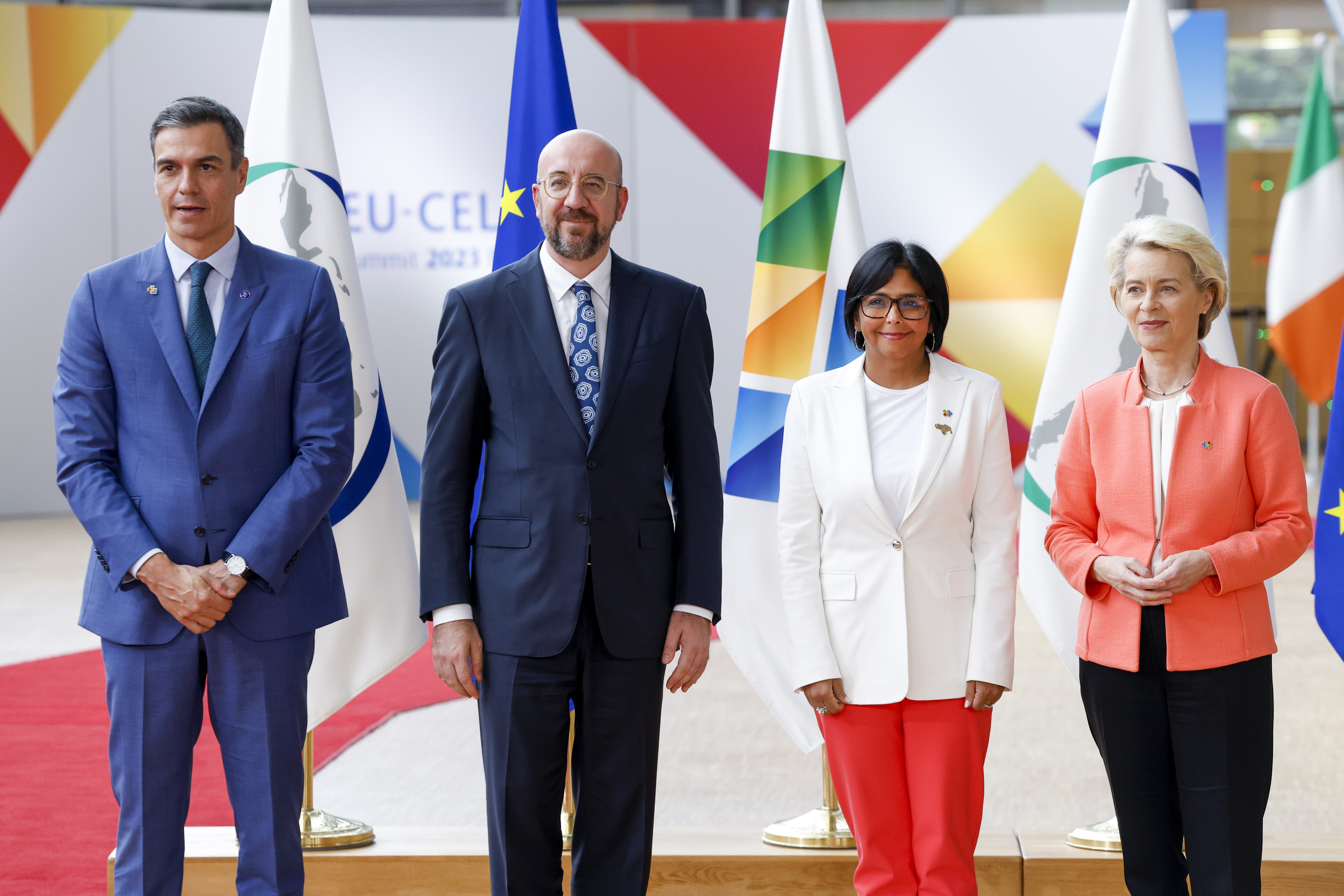
Rodríguez with Ursula von der Leyen, Charles Michel and Pedro Sánchez in Brussels in 2023, five years after European sanctions against Rodríguez

In January 2020, a controversy emerged in Spain surrounding Rodríguez's presence at Madrid–Barajas Airport in Spain, where she was purported to have met with Spanish politician José Luis Ábalos. This incident sparked significant attention because, since November 2017, Rodríguez has been prohibited from entering the territory of the European Union. Ábalos denied having met Rodríguez.

The incident took place on 20 January, when the aircraft bearing the registration TC-AKE and flying the Turkish flag arrived at the terminal. Upon recognizing Rodríguez among the passengers, Spanish authorities decided to prevent her entry into the country. Accompanying Rodríguez on the flight were Kenny Antonio Díaz, Alejandra Carolina Bastidas, Yussef Abou Nassif Smaili (her partner), Jorge Andrés Giménez (the president of the Venezuelan Football Federation), and minister Félix Plasencia.

The scandal originated from a covert visit by Delcy Rodríguez to Spain, during which she allegedly facilitated the fraudulent sale of 104 bars of Venezuelan gold to Spanish businessmen for $68.5 million. This transaction was purportedly conducted through the Spanish Ministry of Transport, with the involvement of then-Transport Minister José Luis Ábalos, who is under investigation as part of the Koldo Case. According to reports by El Confidencial, Rodríguez offered these gold bars to Spanish entrepreneurs during meetings arranged with Ábalos, with the approval of Spanish Prime Minister Pedro Sánchez.

The Guardia Civil's Central Operative Unit (UCO) uncovered communications on Spanish businessman Víctor de Aldama's mobile phone that directly linked him to Rodríguez, indicating discussions about the purchase of Venezuelan gold. A contract dated 27 December 2019 outlined the delivery of the gold between 27 December 2019 and 6 January 2020, shortly before Rodríguez's secret trip to Madrid, which was officially described by La Moncloa as a "technical stopover".

According to the Diario de Cuba, this connection underscored the alleged lack of commitment by the Spanish government to support a democratic transition in Venezuela. A 2020 U.S. government official said Spain was a significant barrier within the European Union in confronting the Venezuelan government. The scandal also involved a strategic omission of the gold transaction details in the official invitation sent by Ábalos to Rodríguez, which instead focused on humanitarian aid and support for Spanish businesses in Venezuela. In response, the opposition Partido Popular accused Sánchez of deceit regarding the true purpose of Rodríguez's visit and declared intentions to launch a comprehensive political, judicial, and international campaign to uncover the truth behind Delcygate.

=== Criticism of foreign officials ===
During a 2017 meeting of the Organization of American States (OAS), Rodríguez accused some member states of interfering in Venezuela. She called the OAS Secretary General, Luis Almagro, a "liar, dishonest, a criminal, and a mercenary, a traitor to everything that represents the dignity of a Latin American diplomat". Her remarks were criticised by Uruguayan Foreign Minister Rodolfo Nin Novoa. In June 2017, Rodríguez criticised the President of Peru, Pedro Pablo Kuczynski, after Kuczynski proposed international intervention in Venezuela.

== Personal life ==
Rodríguez was the romantic partner of the Venezuelan actor and model Fernando Carrillo until 2007.

Rodríguez is a follower of Indian guru Sathya Sai Baba.

== See also ==
- List of elected and appointed female state leaders
- List of female foreign ministers
- List of foreign ministers in 2017
- List of ministers of foreign affairs of Venezuela

== Notes ==
Political offices
Preceded by Rafael Ramírez	Minister of Foreign Affairs; 2014–2017	Succeeded by Samuel Moncada
Vacant Title last held by Luis Miquilena (1999)	President of the Constituent Assembly of Venezuela; 2017–2018	Succeeded by Diosdado Cabello
Preceded by Tareck El Aissami	Vice President of Venezuela; 2018–present	Incumbent
Preceded by Nicolás Maduro	President of Venezuela; Acting; 2026–present	Incumbent
Assembly seats
New office	Member of the Constituent Assembly of Venezuela for the municipality of Libertador, Caracas; 2017–2020	Constituency abolished
