= Jorge Antonio Rodríguez =

Guerrilla and student leader (1942–1976)

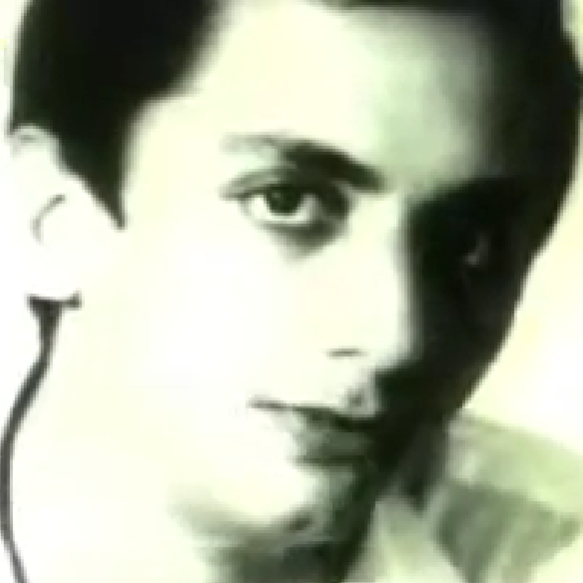
- Born: February 16, 1942; Carora, United States of Venezuela
- Died: July 25, 1976 (aged 34); Caracas, Fourth Republic of Venezuela
- Resting place: Southern General Cemetery
- Political party: Revolutionary Left Movement (1960–1973); Socialist League (1973–1976)
- Children: Jorge Rodríguez; Delcy Rodríguez

Jorge Antonio Rodríguez (February 16, 1942 – July 25, 1976) was a Venezuelan student leader, politician, guerrilla fighter, and revolutionary. He was a leader of the Revolutionary Left Movement and, later, the founder of the Socialist League. He became known in the 1970s for leading the kidnapping of the American executive William Niehous.

On February 27, 1976, a guerrilla commando kidnapped William Niehous, the local president of Owens-Illinois, from his residence in Caracas. The kidnappers, members of the Revolutionary Organization (OR), a faction derived from the MIR and linked to the Socialist League, justified their act by arguing that Niehous was an enemy of Venezuela. Niehous's kidnapping, which lasted three years and four months, is considered one of the longest in Venezuelan history. Rodríguez was arrested for his involvement in the kidnapping and died under torture while being interrogated by the Directorate of Intelligence and Prevention Services (DISIP), a fact that led to the dismissal of several officials, including director Arístides Lander.

Rodríguez is the father of the acting president of Venezuela, Delcy Rodríguez, and Jorge Rodríguez, who also held high positions in the governments of Hugo Chávez and Nicolás Maduro.

== Early life and education ==
Jorge Antonio Rodríguez was born in Carora on February 16, 1942 into a low-income family. His parents were Pascual Florido and Eloína Rodríguez. His wife was Delcy Gómez; their children are Jorge Jesús and Delcy Eloína.

Due to economic difficulties, Rodríguez did not start high school immediately after finishing primary school. He later studied at the Gervasio Rubio Technical School of Agriculture—then known as the Normal School of Rubio—located in Táchira State, where he graduated as a rural teacher. After completing his high school degree in 1964 at Egidio Montesinos High School, he moved to Caracas to enroll at the Central University of Venezuela (UCV).

== Political life ==
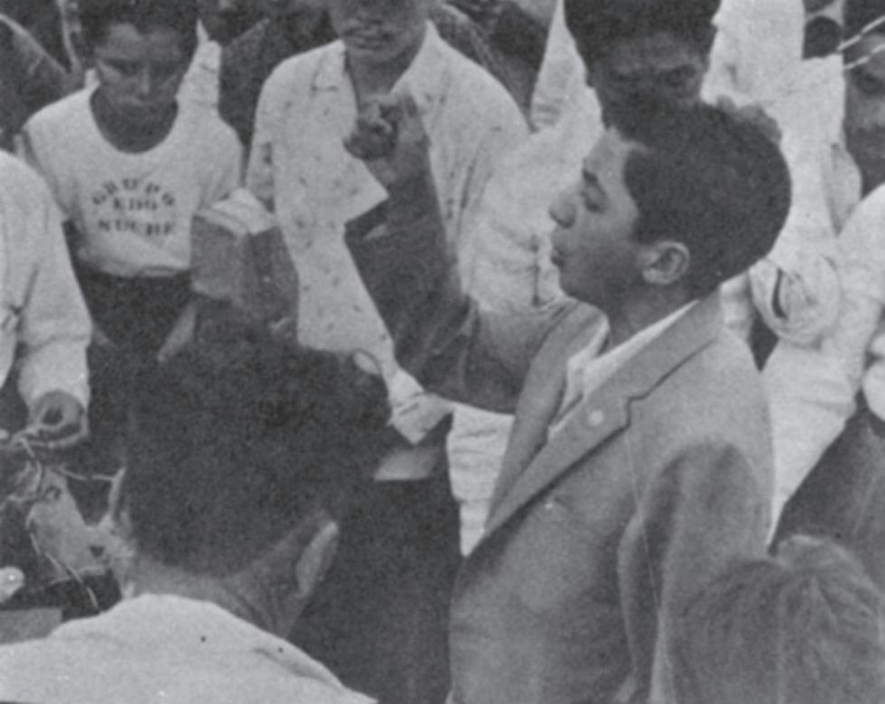
Jorge Antonio Rodríguez at 15 years of age in Rubio, Venezuela, as a youth member of Democratic Action

Rodríguez briefly served in the youth section of the Democratic Action party. At UCV, he was active in the Revolutionary Left Movement (Spanish: Movimiento de Izquierda Revolucionaria, MIR); he was also part of the student leadership in the Federation of University Centers and was a delegate of the University Council.

In 1972, Rodríguez was arrested by the Armed Forces Intelligence Service (SIFA) and accused of military rebellion.

Jorge Rodríguez called for the creation of the Socialist League as a revolutionary left-wing party in November 1973, in which he served as general secretary.

== Kidnapping of William Niehous ==
Rodríguez was allegedly one of the leaders involved in the kidnapping of William Niehous by leftist guerrillas in Venezuela on February 27, 1976. At the time, Niehous was the head of operations in Venezuela for Owens-Illinois, an American glass bottle company; far-left groups said he was an agent of the Central Intelligence Agency. He was drugged and kidnapped from his home in Caracas, and his company was accused of bribery and corruption with the Venezuelan government. Niehous remained captive for three years, four months and two days, recognized as the longest in Venezuelan politics.

According to Diario Las Americas, "court documents and testimonies from the time" indicated that Owens-Illinois had paid US$20 million ransom for Niehous, but "Rodríguez misappropriated the money, causing an internal rift with his own colleagues" which "led members of the cell themselves to betray him". During the search for the kidnapped American, Rodríguez was detained, interrogated and tortured.

== Death ==
According to El País, "Jorge Antonio coordinated the kidnapping, but was later arrested as the mastermind and died under torture at the hands of the state." Rodríguez was detained and interrogated by agents of the Directorate of Intelligence and Prevention Services (DISIP) on July 23, 1976. He was murdered, dying on July 25, 1976. His official cause of death was a heart attack, which was attributed to the torture he was subjected to during his detention. Autopsy found "seven broken ribs, a collapsed chest, and a detached liver". He died at the age of 34, when his children, Jorge and Delcy—who would hold important positions in the government of Nicolás Maduro almost fifty years later–were ten and seven.

A U.S. Central Intelligence Agency report, declassified in 2017, states that at least part of the beating leading to his death took place in house belonging to Erasto Fernandez, head of one of the several unofficial presidential security and investigative units and in charge of the Niehous kidnapping investigation. The report states "the identity of Rodriguez' killer is not known", however four DISIP officers agreed to stand trial and be sentenced for the crime in return for a payment of VED250,000 (approximately U.S.$58,400 – equivalent to $330,500 in 2025) each and an assurance that they would be released from prison in under 18 months. The report states that Minister of Interior Octavio Lepage had ordered that Rodríguez not be harmed, but at the DISIP Deputy Director level Humberto Gippuni ordered that Rodríguez be beaten.
