= Abduction of William Niehous =

Late 1970s kidnapping in Venezuela

William Frank Niehous (August 11, 1931 – October 9, 2013) was an American executive for Owens-Illinois Inc. who was abducted in Venezuela by the Marxist Revolutionary Group of Commands (GCR). (Note: "Grupo de Comandos Revolucionarios (GCR).") His captivity became the longest kidnapping of a U.S. national in Latin America. His captors claimed he was a CIA spy.

The GCR referred to the operation as "Argimiro Gabaldón". Because the group lacked the financial and logistical capacity to sustain a prolonged abduction, it initially sought support from the left-wing Red Flag group. (Note: "Bandera Roja.") When this cooperation proved insufficient, the GCR established further ties with the Socialist League, co-founded by Jorge Antonio Rodríguez. The subsequent arrest and killing of Rodríguez by the Directorate of Intelligence and Prevention Services for his involvement in the kidnapping was a foundational memory for his daughter, Delcy Rodríguez, who was seven years old when her father died. The event was one of the reasons for her adopting a political career. She became acting president of Venezuela after the US kidnapped Nicolás Maduro in January 2026.

Niehous' kidnappers demanded, as a condition of his release, a 3.5 million U.S. dollar ransom ($19.8 million in 2025), that Owens-Illinois compensate each of its Venezuelan employees with $116 for their "exploitation", that they donated 18 thousand food packages to the poor, and that they advertised a manifesto that criticized the government and accused the company of corruption and disrupting in the nation's internal politics. The group said that Niehous was a CIA agent and announced that they intended to try him for "counter-revolutionary activities".

He was held from February 1976 until his rescue by rural police in June 1979. Gabriel Puerta Aponte, one of the individuals involved in the kidnapping, remained a leading figure within Red Flag as late as 2013.
