= Revolutionary Left Movement (Venezuela) =

Revolutionary Left Movement Movimiento de Izquierda Revolucionaria
- Leader: Domingo Alberto Rangel
- Founded: 8 April 1960
- Dissolved: 1988
- Split from: Democratic Action
- Merged into: MAS
- Ideology: Marxism
- Political position: Left-wing

Party flag

The Revolutionary Left Movement (Spanish: Movimiento de Izquierda Revolucionaria, MIR) was a Marxist political party in Venezuela. It split from Democratic Action in 1960 and became involved in armed guerrilla struggle against the Venezuelan state.

MIR merged with the Movement for Socialism (MAS) in 1988.

== History ==
The origins of the party can be traced directly to the first visit Commander Fidel Castro made to Venezuela, specifically to its capital Caracas in January 1959, to celebrate the first anniversary of the fall of the military dictatorship of General Marcos Pérez Jiménez. Castro's visit served him to encourage the youth of the Democratic Action around the epic lived by the Cuban Revolution in Sierra Maestra. The political contrast of Castro and then Venezuelan president, Rómulo Betancourt, made the political youth of the time more encouraged towards Castro's position, this made more by generational differences than ideological ones. To round off the internal crisis, Democratic Action expelled from their ranks a number of youth leaders and party members that identified themselves with Cuban policy in addition to constant criticism of the policy of unemployment, struggle against reaction, land reform, economic policy, fiscal and international all contrary to the doctrinal basis of Democratic Action.

For these reasons, Domingo Alberto Rangel, Gumersindo Rodriguez and Jose Rafael Muñoz justified the division from their former party and founded, with groups of mostly young people, the new leftist revolutionary party. At the exact moment of the creation of MIR, it pleaded, according to their weekly Izquierda, as a "Marxist party, their goal was to drive the Venezuelan people to the path of socialism through the National Revolution realizing a clearly anti-imperialist and anti-feudal program".

On May 9, 1962, the Communist Party of Venezuela (PCV) and the MIR are disabled by the government of Romulo Betancourt and they assume the armed struggle that lasted until the first government of Rafael Caldera. However it was MIR that first launched to the armed struggle in Venezuela causing serious urban clashes between 1961 and 1962 and the installation of a guerrilla front in the East of the country which they called Front Manuel Ponte Rodríguez, to be later dismantled in 1964 by the Venezuelan army and reconstituted in 1965 with the name of Guerrilla Front Antonio Jose de Sucre.

During this time, the MIR integrates with the PCV, the so-called Armed Forces of National Liberation (FALN). Some of their leaders included Domingo Alberto Rangel, Jose Manuel "Chema" Saher, Américo Silva, Americo Martin, Simon Saez Mérida, Etanislao Gonzalez, Jose Manuel Gilli Trejo, Ruben Jaramillo, Gabriel Puerta Aponte, Victor and Fernando Soto Rojas, Julio Escalona, Marcos Gomez, Carlos José Ugueto Marino and Carlos Betancourt.

The MIR was actively involved in subversive struggles developed in Venezuela in the 1960s. One of the most active cells was named "Van Troi" led by Jesus Alberto Marquez Finol who executed many officers, soldiers and civilians for not supporting the armed struggle, such as the shooting of Doctor Alfredo Seijas, Legal Counsel of the DIGEPOL in September 1965, who was a lawyer and was abducted from inside the Central University of Venezuela (UCV) and moved towards urbanization Macaracuay of Caracas, to run to death. Other rural guerrilla Youth members of the MIR, as Ramon Amundaray Sanchez, died after being caught flying a pipeline north of the state Anzoátegui.

== Divisions ==
Just as the MIR decided to go to the armed struggle, a sector of the party opposed to these actions, led by Jorge Dager, decided to found on 20 August 1962 the People's Democratic Force party, achieving about 10% of the votes in 1963. On 1965 another sector from the party withdraws and merges itself to the Revolutionary Party of Nationalist Integration (PRIN). Then at the end of 1968, the MIR faces fierce controversy at the armed struggle infertile actions and is divided into three groups: the main MIR, led by Domingo Alberto Rangel, who pacifies and denies armed violence, supporting presidential elections from 1973, 1983 and 1988 choosing Movement for Socialism (MAS) candidates: José Vicente Rangel and Teodoro Petkoff. The group of Carlos Betancourt who formed the Red Flag Party on January 20, 1970, with a predominantly rural guerrilla trend, later legalized as a party in 2000 but not before suffering several internal divisions. And the third group led by Jorge Rodriguez and Julio Escalona who decide to start an urban guerrilla struggle but combined with legal means, creating the Revolutionary Organization (OR), whose legal facade would be called Socialist League and would participate in the elections being led by Carmelo Laborit, Jorge Rodriguez, Orlando Yajure, Oscar Battaglini, Norelkis Meza and David Nieves. Furthermore, Américo Martin created a new political group called New Alternative.

Starting on 1982, the main trend in the MIR began a process of alliance and merger with the Movement for Socialism (MAS). In 1983, participating in the elections for president and Congress within the electoral card called MAS-MIR. After this election, it starts the final merger of both parties, leaving the MIR officially disbanded and most of its members integrated into the MAS.

== See also ==
- Red Flag Party (Partido Bandera Roja), which split from MIR in 1970
- Socialist League (Liga Socialista), which split from MIR in 1973
