= Directorate of Intelligence and Prevention Services =

Venezuelan intelligence agency, 1999–2009

- Dirección de los Servicios de Inteligencia y Prevención; DISIP
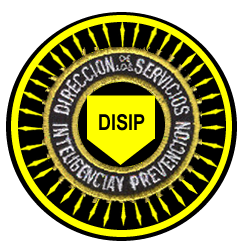
- Seal of the Directorate of Intelligence and Prevention Services

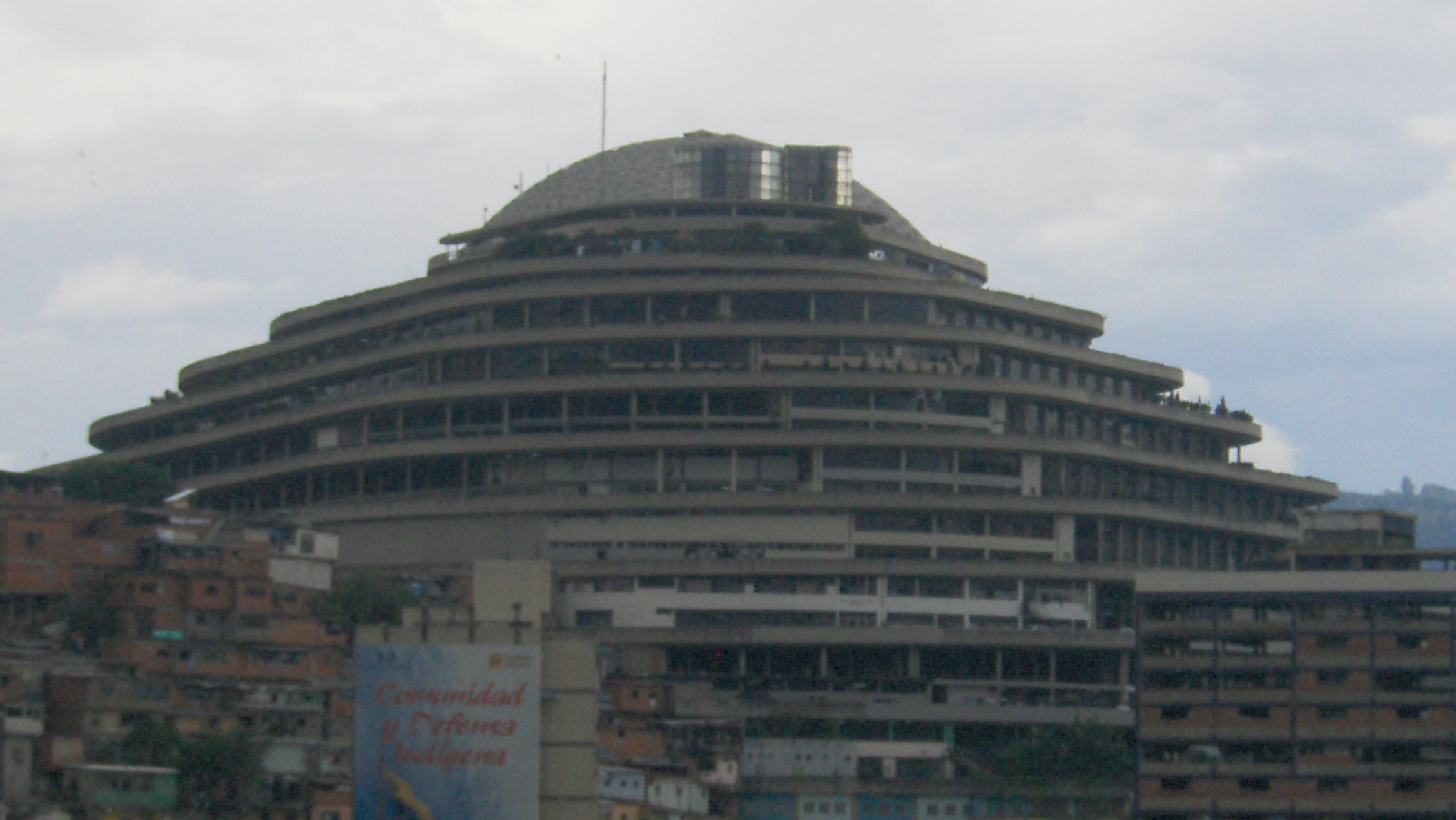
- El Helicoide building in Caracas - former headquarters of DISIP

Agency overview
- Formed: March 19, 1969
- Preceding agency: DIGEPOL
- Dissolved: December 4, 2009
- Superseding agency: SEBIN
- Headquarters: Caracas, Venezuela

The Directorate of Intelligence and Prevention Services (Spanish: Dirección de los Servicios de Inteligencia y Prevención, DISIP) was an intelligence and counter-intelligence agency based out of Venezuela and operating abroad from 1969 until 2009 when the SEBIN was created by former President Hugo Chávez. DISIP was established in March 1969 by then-president Rafael Caldera, replacing the Directorate General of Police (DIGEPOL).

== History ==
=== Origin ===
With the overthrow of dictator Marcos Pérez Jiménez in January 1958, Venezuela was plunged into an acute institutional crisis in the police and security area, following the dismantling of the Seguridad Nacional, also called "political police"; the absence of a similar, moderately effective organization gives rise to impromptu Technical Services Criminology, an organization in the popular police jargon was known as Criminology, was a time of much confusion as it was beginning to take shape guerrilla activity and for that reason the political activism of opposition was severely punished.

On April 29, 1959, according to Executive Order No. 51, taking into account the need to define the roles and responsibilities of the various police forces, the general direction of police "DIGEPOL", DISIP's predecessor organization, which creates would have the task "to exercise and coordinate the entire national territory policing aimed at the preservation of order and public tranquility", according to its powers under the Ministry of Interior, in Article No. 18 of the Constitution of Ministries, without prejudice to the legal powers of the Judicial Technical Police and state police. With this decision, the powers of the criminal police, faculty and power of intelligence and state security were separated.

=== 1960s ===
==== Creation of DISIP ====
When Rafael Caldera assumed his first presidency in the Venezuela, he ordered the dissolution of the DIGEPOL and signed Decree No. 15, dated March 19, 1969 giving birth to the "Directorate of Intelligence and Prevention Services" whose initials are DISIP. Its objective was to demonstrate the initial combat subversion and drug trafficking. Its first commanders took the initiative to establish appropriate training courses and their members, mostly from former members of DIGEPOL.

The first head of DISIP was Cuban dissident Luis Posada Carriles. During his leadership, Posada was in countering various Cuban-supported guerrilla movements in Venezuela. Posada was dismissed from the service in 1974 due to ideological differences with the government of Carlos Andrés Pérez.

=== 1970s ===
In its early years, DISIP had nearly 4,000 employees on the payroll between the areas of administration, police and intelligence. The story of the early years of the DISIP parallels the political group "Bandera Roja", whose leaders Carlos Betancourt (under the pseudonym "Gerónimo"), Eduardo Candiales Barrios and Gabriel Puerta Aponte, Lieutenant Betancourt was confronted by the police organization from the beginning of the group. The DISIP conducted the first dismantling of this group between 1972 and 1973. They also acted against the Party of the Venezuelan Revolution (PRV-FALN) and other smaller groups, achieving frustrate many plans uprising of leftist groups of the time.

In the mid-1970s to the need to raise the technical level of the security agency was created Brigade speeches or Command groups led by the Commissioner General Henry López Sisco, who led major operations against leftist guerrillas in the field.

On August 27, 1975, the director of the Chilean DINA, Manuel Contreras, held a meeting with head of DISIP Rafael Rivas Vázquez. According to an investigation by journalist John Dinges, the meeting was intended to seek Venezuela's collaboration with Operation Condor, a cooperation program between South American dictatorships to capture and disappear political dissidents. Some of these dissidents were refugees in Venezuela and there was interest in capturing them, but the agreement was not reached due to the opposition of President Carlos Andrés Pérez.

In 1976, the leader of Revolutionary Left Movement and founder of the Socialist League, Jorge Antonio Rodríguez, was detained by DISIP agents, who tortured him to death. Minister of Interior Octavio Lepage had ordered that Rodríguez not be harmed, and Lepage replaced the Director of DISIP Aristides Lander with General Raus Gimenez Gainza as a result of the death.

=== 1980s ===
In this context, the DISIP holding several clashes such as the Cantaura massacre, occurred between 4 and 8 October 1982 where some tens of DISIP agents with more than 400 soldiers from the Armed Forces killed 23 Front guerrilla fighters "Americo Silva", belonging to rural guerrilla group Red Flag.

During the Caracazo, DISIP officers were reported to have beat detained protesters with baseball bats and pipes.

=== 1990s ===
In the 1990s, the DISIP forward intelligence operations against the rebel soldiers led by Hugo Chávez and Francisco Arias Cárdenas giving two attempted coup against President Carlos Andrés Pérez in 1992, the national government of the time authorized actions to not investigate suspects of participants in the coup. In the particular case of November 27, 1992, officers of the Brigade of Interventions, Vehicular Patrol, the General Intelligence and Investigation Division faced by National Guard military rebels, the latter being defeated. DISIP facilities in El Helicoide in Caracas were bombed by the rebel air force.

Amnesty International expressed concern over excessive use of force by the DISIP, and the increasing polarization and political violence in Venezuela since Chávez was elected in December 1998. During the president Hugo Chávez, a crackdown against suspected looters in the state of Vargas following the 1999 mudslides became, according to Human Rights Watch, "the first major human rights test of the Chávez government. At first, Chávez dismissed the reports as 'suspicious' and 'superficial,' but the evidence soon obliged the president and other top government officials to acknowledge the seriousness of the situation." Human Rights Watch expressed their deep concern over DISIP (and National Guard) abuse in Venezuela in a 2004 personal letter to President Hugo Chávez.

=== 2000s ===
The Chávez administration distanced its intelligence services from the United States into the 2000s, instead partnering with Cuba, Lebanon and Libya for its DISIP operations, providing advisory offices for each nation in El Helicoide. DISIP was also used to fund Bolivarian Circles to provide intelligence from poor areas.

Human Rights Watch expressed concern over DISIP (and National Guard) abuse in Venezuela in a 2004 personal letter to President Hugo Chávez.
