= Socialist League (Venezuela) =

Socialist League Liga Socialista
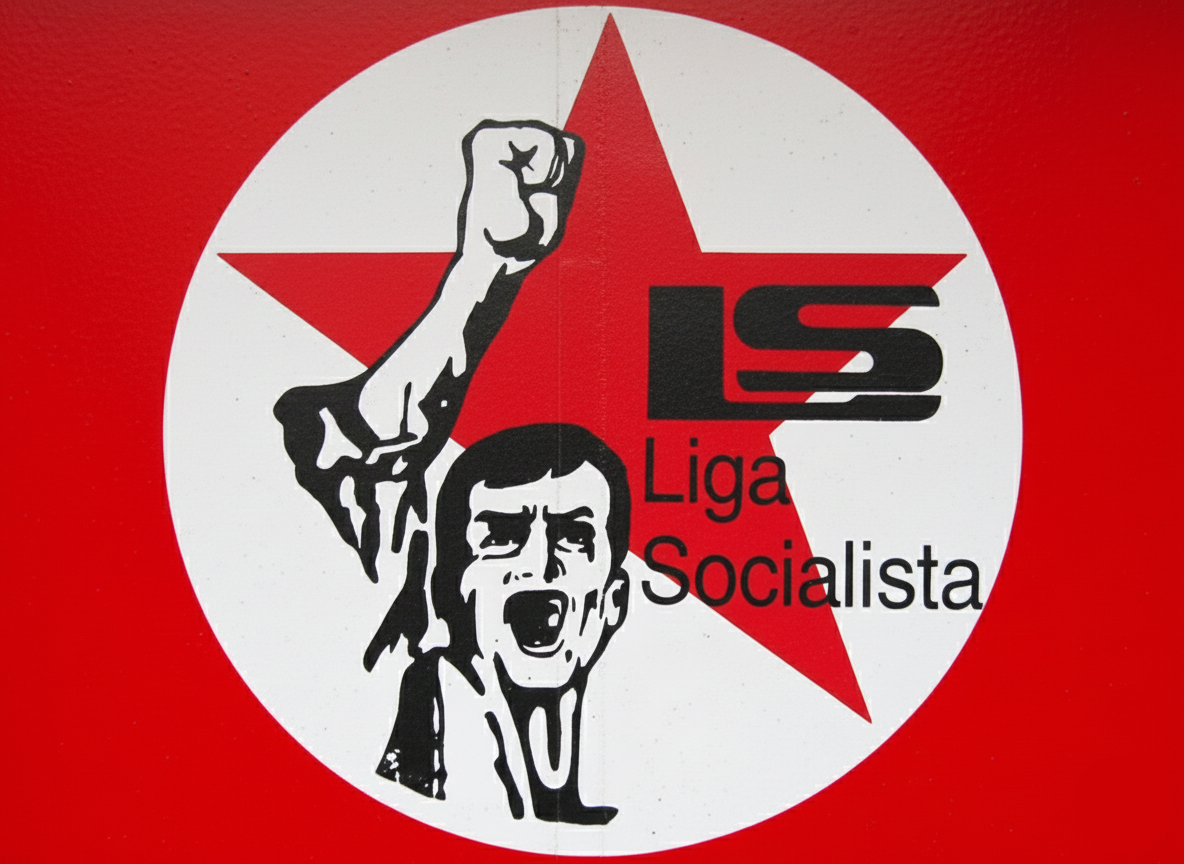
- Abbreviation: LS
- Founder: Jorge Antonio Rodríguez
- Founded: 1973
- Dissolved: 2007
- Split from: Revolutionary Left Movement
- Merged into: PSUV
- Headquarters: Caracas
- Ideology: Marxism; Castroism; Marxism-Leninism-Maoism
- Political position: Far-left

The Socialist League (Spanish: Liga Socialista, 'LS), initially known as the League for People's Rights and Socialism (Spanish: Liga por los Derechos del Pueblo y el Socialismo, LDPS), was a Venezuelan political party. It was established in 1973 in a split from the Revolutionary Left Movement.

The League was founded by Jorge Antonio Rodríguez, who was its Secretary General and the father of Delcy Rodríguez Gómez and Jorge Rodríguez Gómez, both of whom have held high positions in the governments of Hugo Chávez and Nicolás Maduro. It agreed in 2006 to merge into the United Socialist Party of Venezuela (PSUV), which was founded by Chávez and coordinated in its early days by the son of Jorge Antonio, Jorge Rodríguez Gómez.

It was described as Marxist-Leninist-Maoist, although it was also explicitly pro-Cuban. It rejected Soviet Union's claim to leadership of international communism, and was committed to violent revolution. It was legally structured and won a seat in the National Assembly of Venezuela in the 1978 Venezuelan general election. It formed a military unit that carried out the abduction of William Niehous, an American businessman, in 1976. The group obtained 20 million US dollars for the hostage, and held him captive for over 3 years. After Herrera Campins became the president of Venezuela in 1979, Socialist League was pacified and legalized, ending its period of armed struggle.

Nicolás Maduro was a member of the Socialist League. When the organization reached an agreement with Cuba to send a small group of activists to Havana for political and military training, Maduro was amongst the ones sent by the Socialist League. Trained as an active cadre, Maduro later moved into union activism after securing a position in the Caracas Metro. He was trained in the Julio Antonio Mella National Cadre School, under the personal tutelage of members of the Political Bureau of the Communist Party of Cuba.

According to El País, the "League was a tiny party that promoted armed struggle between the 1970s and 1980s", that "demobilized" after its showing in the 1988 Venezuelan general election. In the 1998 Venezuelan presidential election, the League endorsed Hugo Chávez. Most members of the Socialist League, including Nicolás Maduro, Jorge Rodríguez, and Delcy Rodríguez, went on to become major officials of the Venezuelan chavista government in the 2000s. In 2007, Socialist League merged into the United Socialist Party of Venezuela of Hugo Chávez.
