= Briceño =

Briceño (also anglicized as Briceno) may refer to:

== Places ==
- Briceño, Antioquia, town and municipality in Antioquia Department, Colombia
- Briceño, Boyacá, town and municipality in Boyacá Department, Colombia

== People ==
- Alonso de Briceño (1587–1668), Roman Catholic prelate, Bishop of Caracas
- Antonio Briceño (born 1966), Venezuelan photographer and environmental activist
- Arnulfo Briceño (1938–1989), Colombian songwriter and lawyer
- Bárbara Briceño (born 1996), Peruvian volleyball player
- Carlos Briceno (born 1967), American volleyball player
- Daniel Briceño (disambiguation), multiple people, including:
  - Daniel Briceño (Colombian footballer) (born 1985), Colombian footballer
  - Daniel Briceño (Chilean footballer) (born 1982), Chilean footballer
- Elijio Briceño (1938–2016), Belizean politician
- Francisco Briceño (died 1571), Roman Catholic prelate, Bishop of Almería
- Germán Briceño (1919-?), Venezuelan sports shooter
- Humberto Briceño (1928-?), Venezuelan sports shooter
- Johnny Briceño (born 1960), Belizean politician
- José Gregorio Briceño (born 1965), Venezuelan politician
- Josue Briceño (born 2004), Venezuelan baseball player
- Juvenal Briceño (born 1965), Peruvian footballer and manager
- Lorena Briceño (born 1978), Argentine judoka
- Luis de Briceño (fl. 1610s–1630s), Spanish guitarist and music theorist
- Maria Briceno, Venezuelan road cyclist
- Mario Briceño (born 1996), Chilean football winger
- Mario Briceño Iragorry (1897–1958), Venezuelan intellectual and cultural analyst
- Omar Briceño (born 1978), Mexican football defender
- Oscar Briceño (born 1985), Colombian football forward
- Rohel Briceño (born 1984), Venezuelan footballer
- Thomas Briceño (born 1993), Chilean judoka
- Trixie Briceño (1911–1985) Panamanian painter
- Gustavo Rangel Briceño (born 1956), Venezuelan military officer and minister of defense
- Jorge Valero Briceño (born 1946), Venezuelan ambassador

== See also ==
- Briseño, the less popular variant
