= Daniel Briceño =

Daniel Briceño may refer to:

- Daniel Briceño (Colombian footballer) (born 1985), Colombian footballer
- Daniel Briceño (Chilean footballer) (born 1982), Chilean footballer
- Daniel Briceño (politician), Colombian politician
