= 2007 Venezuelan constitutional referendum =

- 2 December 2007

Block A articles
For	49.35%
Against	50.65%

Block B articles
For	48.99%
Against	51.01%

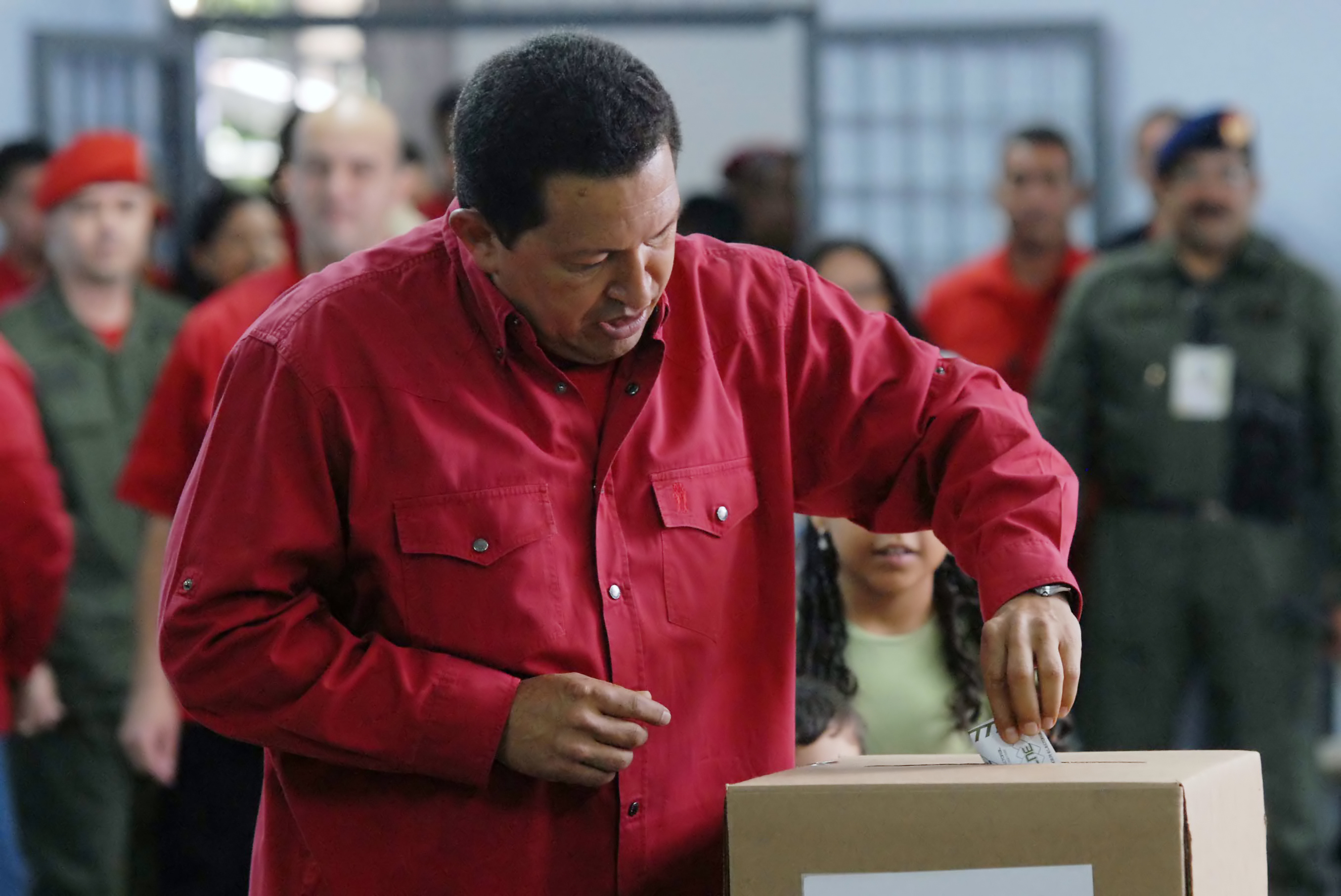
President Chávez voting

A constitutional referendum was held in Venezuela on 2 December 2007 to amend 69 articles of the 1999 Constitution. President Hugo Chávez and supporters claimed the changes were needed to initiate the transformation into a socialist country; opponents claimed the reforms would undermine democracy in the country.

The referendum was narrowly defeated, giving Chávez the first and only election loss of his nine-year presidency. University student protests and opposition from former allies helped fuel the defeat, but the referendum results and the 44% abstention rate suggest that support had also waned among Chávez's traditional base of Venezuela's poor.

== Proposal ==
On 15 August 2007 President Hugo Chávez proposed an amendment to 33 articles of Venezuela's 350-article Constitution. A constitutional provision allows the president, the National Assembly of Venezuela or a constituent assembly to ask for changes; reform should be approved by a national referendum. The 1999 constitution was promoted by Chávez and adopted by popular referendum. The proposed constitutional reforms were needed, according to Chávez, to complete the transition to a socialist republic and implement his socialist agenda; detractors said he was using the reforms to become a dictator. The proposal was hailed by government supporters as "the start of a new era towards socialism", but Podemos, a pro-government party, expressed disagreement and claimed Chávez was seeking lifelong power.

Venezuela's constitutional procedures require three debates before the National Assembly, to reform the constitution. The first debate was successfully held on 21 August 2007 and gave initial approval to the general purpose of the reform. During the second successful vote on 11 September 2007, the National Assembly added amendments to the original Chávez reform proposal, again angering the Podemos party, which said that the National Assembly had infringed the Constitution. The third vote on 25 October 2007 approved the proposal, enlarged from 33 articles to 69. Final parliamentary approval for the referendum was given on 2 November 2007.

The final proposal included 69 constitutional amendments to be voted on in two blocks: 33 that were originally proposed by President Chávez plus another 13 articles introduced by the National Assembly (Proposal A) and 23 more reform articles proposed by the National Assembly (Proposal B). Proposed changes included:

- abolish presidential term limits, allowing for indefinite re-election of the president (not allowed for any other political post),
- expand social security benefits to workers in the informal economy,
- end the autonomy of the central bank, giving control to the president, and place the president in charge of administering the country's international reserves,
- prohibit large land estates, while "allowing the state to provisionally occupy property slated for expropriation before a court has ruled",
- reorganize the country's administrative districts and allow the president to control elected state governors and mayors by an unelected "popular power" dependent on the presidency,
- reduce the maximum working week from 44 to 36 hours and reduce the workday from eight to six hours,
- lower the voting age from 18 to 16,
- increase the presidential term from six to seven years,
- allow the president to declare an unlimited state of emergency,
- prohibit foreign funding for political associations.
- allow public funding for political associations.
- ban discrimination based on sexual orientation.

== Campaign ==
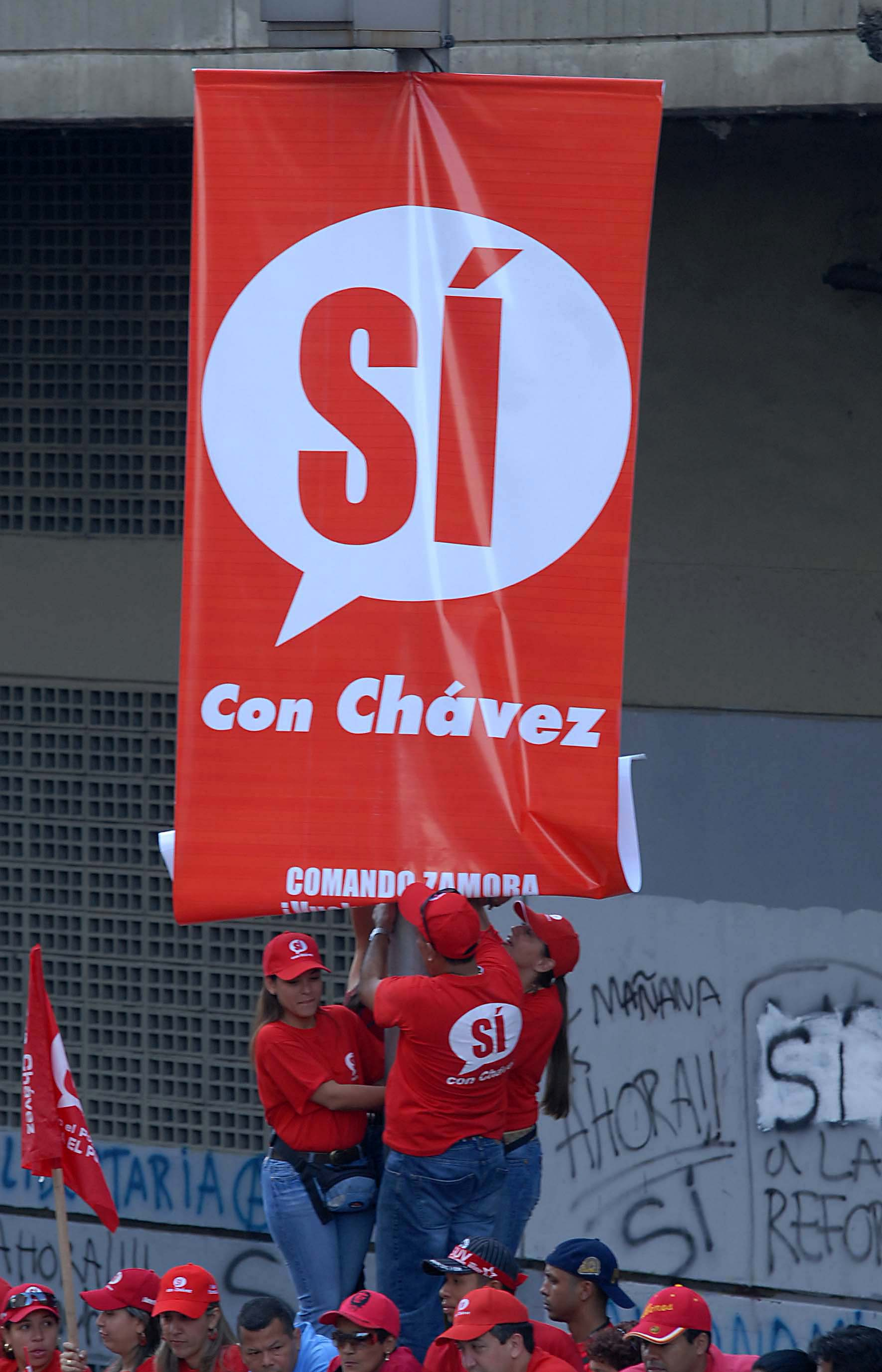
Chávez supporters hang a pro reform poster

In November 2007, demonstrations arose in Caracas, Venezuela and six other cities over the proposed constitutional changes. "Tens of thousands" of "Yes" voters marched in Caracas after the referendum had finally been approved on 2 November. A 7 November riot at the Central University of Venezuela resulted in gunfire and several injuries; footage was caught on tape. In late November 2007, just days before the referendum, tens of thousands marched in Caracas for both the "Yes" and "No" votes. An opposition politician estimated the crowd marching for the "No" vote at 160,000. Protests were largely peaceful, and only one death has been reported.

Some of Chávez's supporters expressed concerns and disagreement with his proposals to change the constitution. Many voters abstained in the vote, rather than cast a "No" vote against Chávez. The student movement played a crucial role in consolidating this position and in organizing numerous rallies. The Centre for Applied Nonviolent Action and Strategies (CANVAS), created by former members of Otpor, contributed to the movement and provided training for students in Belgrade. The student movement has played a large role in the Venezuelan political process, having gained a prominent position during the RCTV broadcast license expiration protests. Although the student movement is not limited to the opposition, it has been the opposition students that have gained the largest support, in part because they are not officially affiliated with any political cadres.

Raúl Baduel, former Minister of Defense and one of the four founding members of Chávez's Revolutionary Bolivarian Movement-200, expressed his concern by describing the reform as "nothing less than an attempt to establish a socialist state in Venezuela ... [which] is contrary to the beliefs of Simón Bolívar and it is also contrary to human nature and the Christian view of society, because it grants the state absolute control over the people it governs". Other leaders and former Chávez supporters who distanced themselves from the proposal were Ismael García, a deputy in the National Assembly, and Ramón Martínez, governor of Sucre State. Marisabel Rodríguez, Chávez's ex-wife, called the proposed changes an attempt to achieve "an absolute concentration of power".

Venezuela's state television network broadcast coverage prior to the referendum of a memo written in Spanish, claiming it evidenced a plan by the CIA to destabilize Chávez —an allegation referred to as Operation Pliers. Chávez threatened to cut off oil exports to the United States if violence resulted from the referendum and declared at his campaign's closing that "whoever voted 'Yes' was voting for Hugo Chávez, but whoever voted 'No' was voting for George W. Bush". The U.S. has responded by calling the allegations "ridiculous" and "a fake". Independent analysts doubt the authenticity of the document, noting both the lack of an original document in English and that "the timing of its release is strange."

== Opinion polls ==
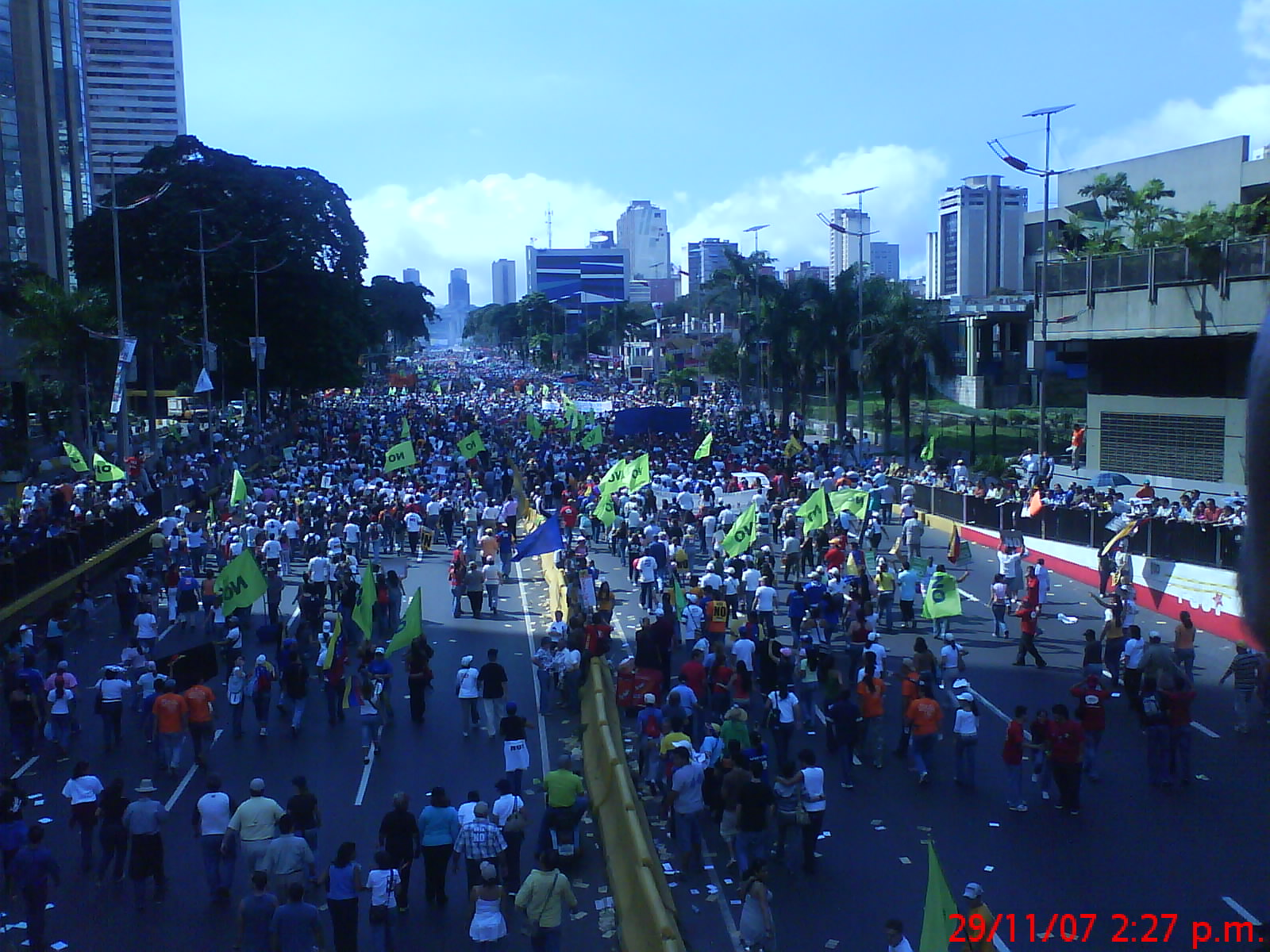
29 November rally by the supporters of the "No" vote

Polls from November saw very close results. In mid-November, a Hinterlaces poll found that 51% of decided voters supported the change, while Mecanálisis said 64% of decided voters would vote against reform. A poll by Keller & Asociados concluded defeat for the proposal with 45% "No" to 31% "Yes" votes; about 65% of eligible people planned to vote. A late-November poll by Datanalisis of 1,854 likely voters indicated 49% were opposed, with 39% in favor. Reportedly, some moderate Chávez backers were likely to vote "No"; it was the first Datanalisis survey to project a loss, contrasted with earlier surveys that showed a win for Chávez "amid low turnout and despite widespread skepticism of his proposal".

== Results ==
The proposal was narrowly defeated, 51 to 49 percent, in the first major electoral defeat for Chávez in the nine years of his presidency. Chávez conceded defeat, saying, "I congratulate my adversaries for this victory", and "for now, we could not do it."

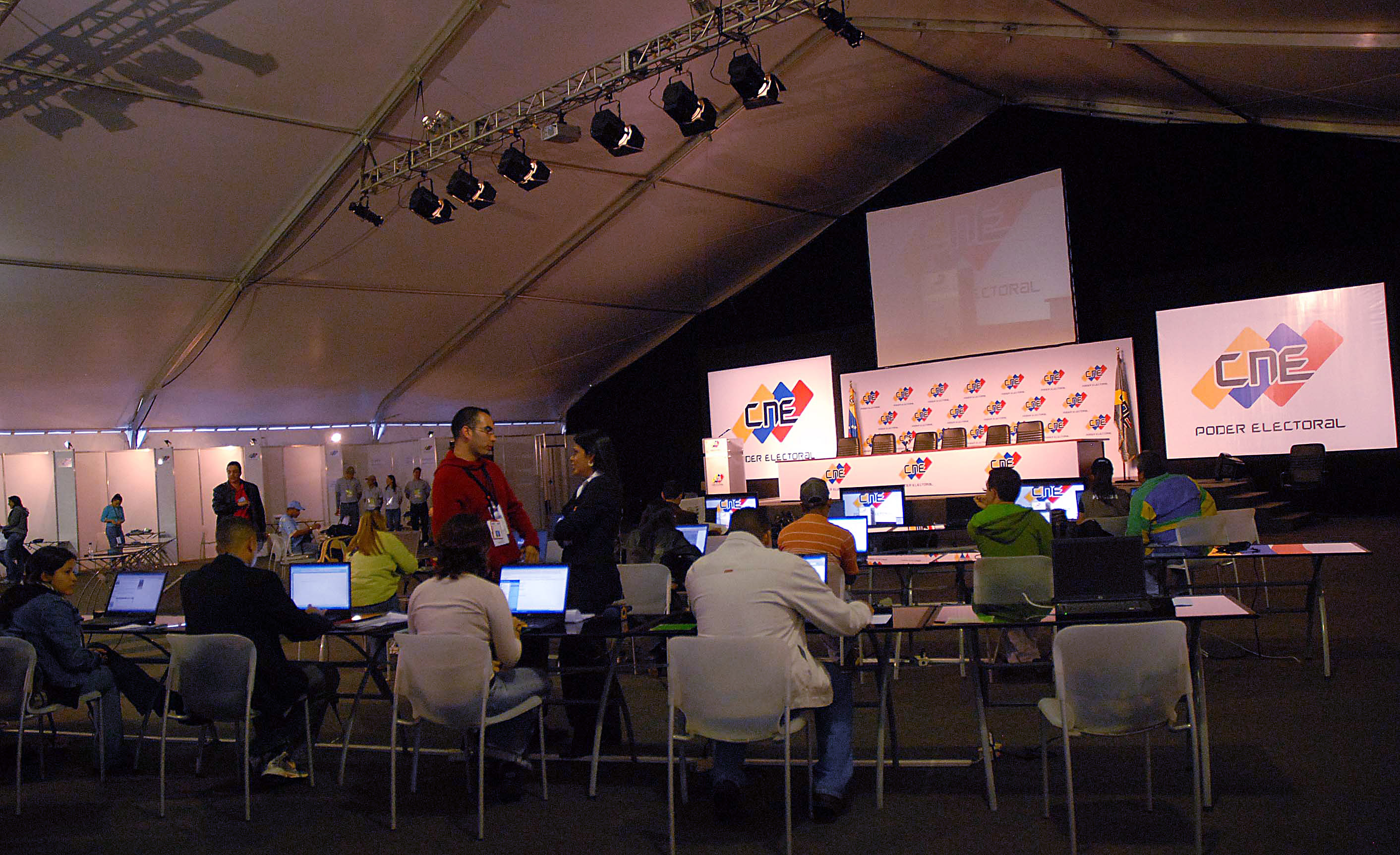
Preparations for the referendum

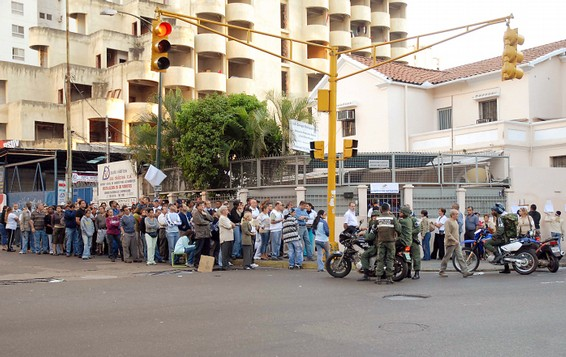
People wait in line to vote in Caracas

Option	For		Against		Invalid/ blank	Total	Registered voters	Turnout	Outcome
Option	Votes	%	Votes	%	Invalid/ blank	Total	Registered voters	Turnout	Outcome
Option A	4,404,626	49.35	4,521,494	50.65	119,155	9,045,275	16,109,664	56.05	Rejected
Option B	4,360,014	48.99	4,539,707	51.01	145,239	9,044,960	16,109,664	56.15	Rejected
Source: El Universal

=== Results by state ===
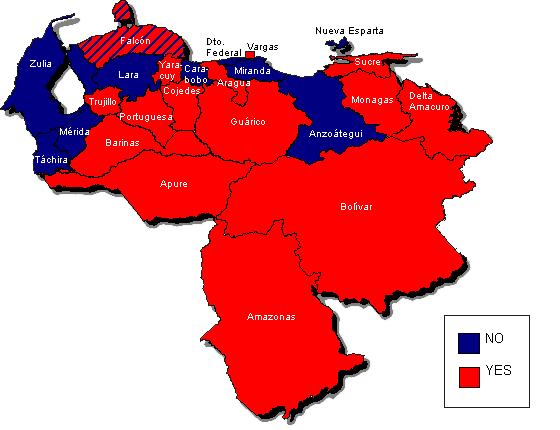
Results by state

Results by state
State	Proposal A			Proposal B		
State	Option	Votes	%	Option	Votes	%
Amazonas	Yes	21,076	65.76	Yes	17,222	57.94
Amazonas	No	10,971	34.23	No	12,501	42.05
Anzoátegui	Yes	206,826	45.60	Yes	205,048	45.34
Anzoátegui	No	246,657	54.39	No	247,124	54.65
Apure	Yes	70,761	61.16	Yes	70,392	60.99
Apure	No	44,936	38.83	No	45,022	39.00
Aragua	Yes	324,745	52.92	Yes	321,586	52.57
Aragua	No	288,897	47.07	No	290,095	47.42
Barinas	Yes	118,198	55.92	Yes	117,440	55.68
Barinas	No	93,166	44.07	No	93,468	44.31
Bolívar	Yes	202,767	52.70	Yes	200,843	52.40
Bolívar	No	181,929	47.29	No	182,414	47.59
Carabobo	Yes	367,532	47.17	Yes	363,825	46.87
Carabobo	No	411,622	52.82	No	412,337	53.12
Cojedes	Yes	65,210	60.87	Yes	64,736	60.64
Cojedes	No	41,914	39.12	No	42,012	39.35
Delta Amacuro	Yes	28,505	60.96	Yes	28,299	60.71
Delta Amacuro	No	18,251	39.03	No	18,308	39.28
Distrito Capital	Yes	392,489	47.58	Yes	388,757	47.15
Distrito Capital	No	432,251	52.41	No	435,627	52.84
Falcón	Yes	136,038	50.12	Yes	134,710	49.76
Falcón	No	135,337	49.87	No	135,983	50.23
Guárico	Yes	132,490	58.35	Yes	131,586	58.12
Guárico	No	94,539	41.64	No	94,796	41.87
Lara	Yes	284,726	48.97	Yes	281,262	48.50
Lara	No	296,603	51.02	No	298,658	51.50
Mérida	Yes	132,979	45.28	Yes	132,355	45.16
Mérida	No	160,657	54.71	No	160,681	54.83
Miranda	Yes	422,811	43.78	Yes	416,797	43.30
Miranda	No	542,799	56.21	No	544,717	56.65
Monagas	Yes	160,096	57.87	Yes	159,079	57.64
Monagas	No	116,532	42.12	No	116,894	42.35
Nueva Esparta	Yes	69,495	43.90	Yes	69,106	43.74
Nueva Esparta	No	88,799	56.09	No	88,862	56.25
Portuguesa	Yes	169,499	63.08	Yes	168,025	62.68
Portuguesa	No	99,207	36.92	No	100,013	37.31
Sucre	Yes	125,494	51.07	Yes	124,818	50.88
Sucre	No	120,214	48.92	No	120,472	49.11
Táchira	Yes	169,171	42.68	Yes	168,024	42.49
Táchira	No	227,156	57.31	No	227,379	57.50
Trujillo	Yes	139,657	62.16	Yes	138,935	61.98
Trujillo	No	85,011	37.83	No	85,215	38.01
Vargas	Yes	68,629	56.21	Yes	67,555	55.65
Vargas	No	53,465	43.79	No	53,830	44.34
Yaracuy	Yes	97,736	52.43	Yes	96,778	52.07
Yaracuy	No	88,647	47.56	No	89,074	47.92
Zulia	Yes	472,462	43.05	Yes	467,958	42.74
Zulia	No	624,790	56.94	No	626,850	57.25

Source: National Electoral Council (CNE)

== Reactions ==
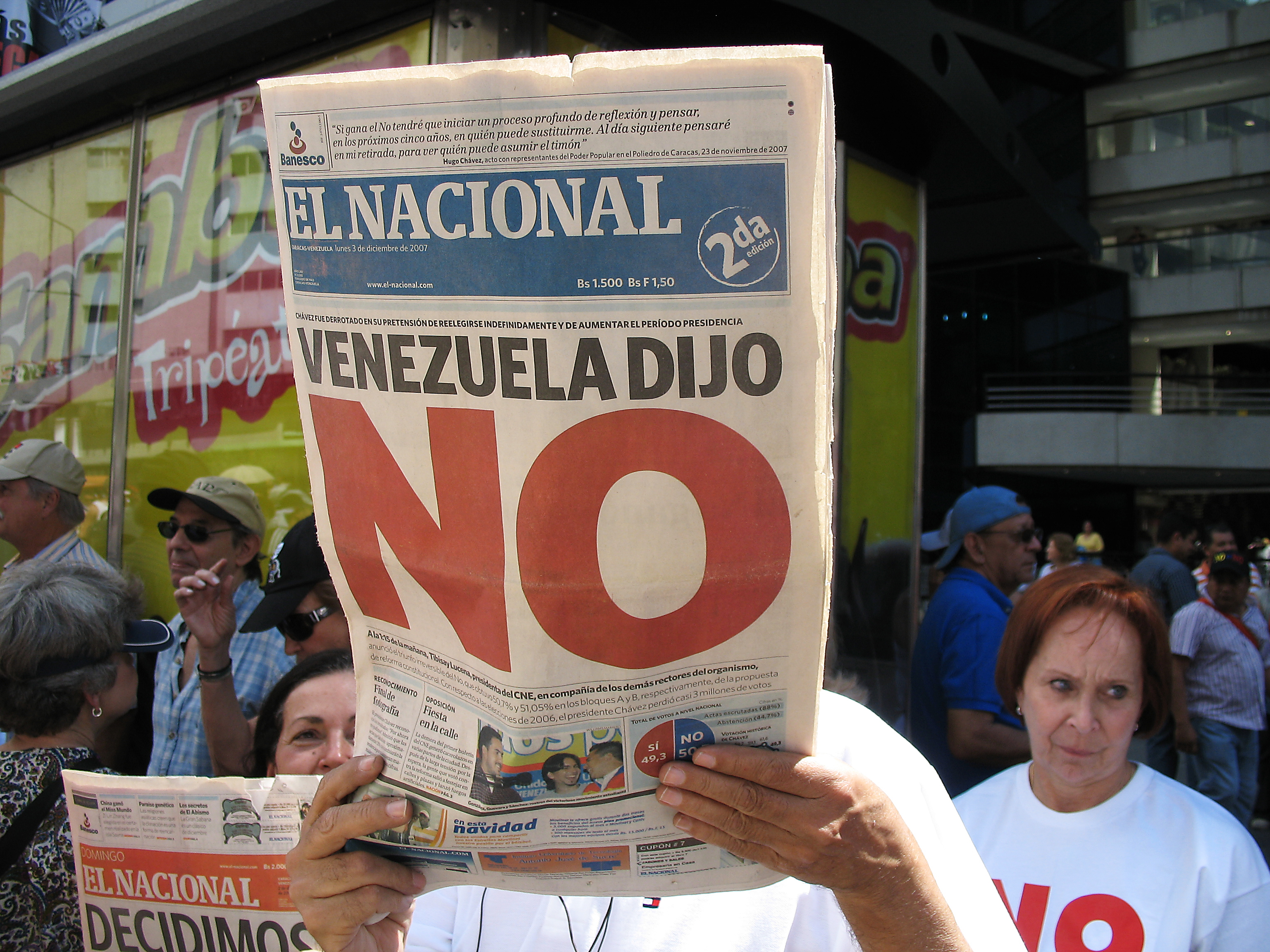
El Nacional headline: "Venezuela said no".

In conceding defeat, Chávez insisted that he would "continue in the battle to build socialism". Although two days later Chavez called "victoria de mierda" (shitty victory) to the results, further saying that "but already you are covering it (the victory) in shit". Chávez conceded defeat by saying "for now, we couldn't" ("por ahora no pudimos"), echoing the phrase he used after the failure of the February 1992 Venezuelan coup d'état attempt. Manuel Rosales, a 2006 Venezuelan presidential candidate, said, "Tonight, Venezuela has won". Leopoldo López, a popular opposition mayor, said "Venezuela won today, democracy won today".

Latin American media responses included special reports that highlighted Chávez's first electoral setback in nine years and his ethical acceptance of defeat. According to a Mercosur press release, the general Latin American response was praise for the "democratic maturity" evidenced by the Venezuelan people. Brazil's Foreign Affairs Minister, Celso Amorin, said "The president accepted the result in a very calm and elegant manner." President Felipe Calderón of Mexico said Chávez had shown " ... enormous valor to admit such results". Spain's Foreign Affairs minister, Miguel Ángel Moratinos, said that "free expression of people's sovereignty has been accepted by all sides including those who had promoted the referendum". Néstor Kirchner, Argentine President described Chávez as a "great democrat". A response characterized by Mercosur as "blunt" came from Cuban Foreign Affairs minister Felipe Perez Roque: "those who have organized plots to destabilize Venezuela, to abolish its democratically elected government and even attempt a coup against President Chávez are active and we hope that they quit and let the Venezuelan people build their future in peace".

The U.S. administration of President George W. Bush hailed the defeat as a victory for democracy. Bush said, "The Venezuelan people rejected one-man rule. They voted for democracy." A National Security Council spokesman said, "We congratulate the people of Venezuela on their vote and their continued desire to live in freedom and democracy". A State Department Undersecretary said, "We felt that this referendum would make Chávez president for life, and that’s not ever a welcome development. In a country that wants to be a democracy, the people spoke, and the people spoke for democracy and against unlimited power." A leader of the student movement, Yon Goicoechea, was awarded the Cato Institute's $500,000 Milton Friedman Liberty Prize in 2008 for his "pivotal role in organizing and voicing opposition to the erosion of human and civil rights" in Venezuela.

The Organization of American States Secretary-General José Miguel Insulza called the results of the referendum an "exemplary development" on the part of the Venezuelan government and people, saying that democracy in the Americas "passed a difficult test and emerged stronger, showing clearly its consolidation." Reporters without Borders expressed hope that the result of the vote would end the "media war" in Venezuela.

The day after the referendum, financial markets were buoyed by Chávez's defeat; Venezuelan bonds rose and the stock index in Caracas surged 4% following a year-to-date 24% decline.

== Aftermath ==
Chávez said on 5 December that he intended to launch a second attempt to change the Constitution. According to El Universal newspaper, he said:

Watch out, US lovers, celebrate. You have no dignity anyhow. Where could you have it? I recommend you to administer your victory wisely, because we will launch a renewed offensive for the great constitutional reform. ... You have a second offensive left for the constitutional reform. I cannot say that we did not make it."

Responding to George W. Bush's remarks, he said:

They say Chávez was blown away. Yes, but I moved not even a millimeter. Yes, I was blown away, but I am weaker not even a millimeter. Be worried, empire; be worried, unpatriotic oligarchy. Strike as many times as you want. But, beware! Do not provoke!

During a press conference with the military high command, he expressed on Venezolana de Televisión the possibility of bringing the proposal back in "the same form, transformed or simplified" in a future referendum and the creation of the Bolivarian militias by modifying the laws regarding the armed forces. He also described the opposition's victory as "full of shit" and his defeat as "full of courage, valor and dignity".

A month after the referendum was defeated, Chávez named Ramón Carrizales to replace vice-president Jorge Rodríguez, who had been blamed by many Chávez supporters for the failed referendum.
