= Football at the 2006 Central American and Caribbean Games =

2006 - Football at the Central American and Caribbean Games
Tournament details
- Host country: Colombia
- City: Cartagena, Colombia
- Dates: 16 July – 29 July
- Teams: 12 (from 2 confederations)
- Venues: 2 (in 2 host cities)

Final positions
- Champions: Colombia (2nd title)
- Runners-up: Venezuela
- Third place: Costa Rica
- Fourth place: Honduras

Tournament statistics
- Matches played: 20
- Goals scored: 69 (3.45 per match)
- Top scorer(s): (Costa Rica) Kenny Cunningham (Colombia) Juan Pablo Pino (5 goals)

The association football competition at the 2006 Central American and Caribbean Games was played from 16 July to 29 July 2006. Qualification took place beforehand.

Colombia won the competition, beating Venezuela 2-1 in the gold medal match. The tournament was made up of U-21 players.

== Medal summary ==
Event	Gold	Silver	Bronze
Men's tournament	Colombia; David Ospina; Pedro Tavima; Daniel Briceno; Jairo Suarez; Braynner Garcia; Harrison Moreales; Jackson Martinez; Dayro Moreno; Armando Carrillo; Sebastian Hernandez; Jose Otalvaro; Carlos Abella; Fredy Guarin; Darwin Quintero; Pablo Armero; Edwin Valencia; Cristian Marrugo; Juan Pablo Pino	Venezuela; Daniel Valdes; Mario Bosetti; Edgar Pico; Grenddy Perozo; Jhon Ospina; Roberto Rosales; Jose Colmenares; Luiryi Erazo; Nicolas Fedor; Tomas Rincon; Ely Valderrey; Tito Rojas; Anderson Arias; Luis Vargas; Ever Espinoza; Jose Granados; Engelbert Perez; Alejandro Guerra	Costa Rica; Keylor Navas; Rigo Ramirez; Daniel Arce; Esteban Granados; Darío Delgado; Bismark Acosta; Windell Gabriel; Kenny Cunningham; Yosimar Arias; Ignacio Aguilar; Ariel Rodriguez; Jody Stewart; Jose Chan; Crisanto Esquivel; Eithel Rodriguez; Cesar Carrillo; Daniel Cambronero

== Preliminary round ==
=== Group A ===
#	Team	P	W	D	L	F	A	PTS	+/-
1	Colombia	2	2	0	0	9	1	6	+8
2	Panama	2	1	0	1	6	2	3	+4
3	Netherlands Antilles	2	0	0	2	0	12	0	-12

July 16, 2006

Colombia	7 - 0	Netherlands Antilles
Martínez 12'; Guarín 18' (pen.); Moreno 56'; Quintero 76', 84'; Pino 81'; Otálvaro 90'	Report

Estadio Jaime Morón León, Cartagena, Colombia
Referee: (El Salvador) Rodolfo Sidrian
July 18, 2006

Netherlands Antilles	0 - 5	Panama
	Report	Aguilar 16'; Sumter 40' (o.g.); Brown 59'; Torres 65'; Buitrago 80'

Estadio Jaime Morón León, Cartagena, Colombia
July 20, 2006

Colombia	2 - 1	Panama
Pino 8', 79'	Report	Castillo 39'

Estadio Jaime Morón León, Cartagena, Colombia
Referee: (Netherlands) José Pineda

=== Group B ===
#	Team	P	W	D	L	F	A	PTS	+/-
1	Venezuela	2	2	0	0	3	1	6	+2
2	Mexico	2	1	0	1	1	1	3	0
3	Cuba	2	0	0	2	1	3	0	-2

July 15, 2006

Cuba	0 - 1	Mexico
	Report	Valadéz 1'

Estadio Metropolitano Roberto Meléndez, Barranquilla, Colombia
July 17, 2006

Cuba	1 - 2	Venezuela
	[Report]

Estadio Metropolitano Roberto Meléndez, Barranquilla, Colombia
July 19, 2006

Venezuela	1 - 0	Mexico
Ospina 30'	Report

Estadio Metropolitano Roberto Meléndez, Barranquilla, Colombia

=== Group C ===
#	Team	P	W	D	L	F	A	PTS	+/-
1	Costa Rica	2	2	0	0	4	2	6	+2
2	Jamaica	2	1	0	1	3	3	3	0
3	Haiti	2	0	0	2	2	4	0	-2

July 16, 2006

Haiti	1 - 2	Jamaica
	[Report]

Estadio Pedro de Heredia, Cartagena, Colombia
July 18, 2006

Costa Rica	2 - 1	Haiti
Cunningham 87', 90+6'	Report	Vubert 47' (pen.)

Estadio Pedro de Heredia, Cartagena, Colombia
July 20, 2006

Costa Rica	2 - 1	Jamaica
Cunningham 44'; Aguilar 87'	Report	West 45+1'

Estadio Pedro de Heredia, Cartagena, Colombia

=== Group D ===
#	Team	P	W	D	L	F	A	PTS	+/-
1	Honduras	2	2	0	0	8	4	6	+4
2	El Salvador	2	1	0	1	8	5	3	+3
3	Barbados	2	0	0	2	2	9	0	-7

July 15, 2006

Barbados	0 - 6	El Salvador
	[Report]

Estadio Metropolitano Roberto Meléndez, Barranquilla, Colombia
July 17, 2006

Barbados	2 - 3	Honduras
	[Report]

Estadio Metropolitano Roberto Meléndez, Barranquilla, Colombia
July 19, 2006

El Salvador	2 - 5	Honduras
Esnal 45' (pen.), 57'	Report	Arbizú 4', 26'; Castillo 14', 26', 78'

Estadio Metropolitano Roberto Meléndez, Barranquilla, Colombia

== Final round ==
=== Bracket ===
Quarter-finals
July 22 - Barranquilla
Venezuela	2
El Salvador	1
July 23 - Cartagena
Costa Rica	3
Panama	1
July 22 - Barranquilla
Honduras	3
Mexico	1
July 23 - Cartagena
Colombia	6
Jamaica	0

Semi-finals
July 26 - Cartagena
Costa Rica	0 (0)
Venezuela	0 (3)
July 26 - Cartagena
Colombia	1
Honduras	0

Final
July 29 - Cartagena
Colombia	2
Venezuela	1
Third place
July 29 - Cartagena
Honduras	0
Costa Rica	1

=== Quarterfinals ===
July 22, 2006

El Salvador	1 - 2	Venezuela
	[Report]

Estadio Metropolitano Roberto Meléndez, Barranquilla, Colombia
July 22, 2006

Honduras	3 - 1	Mexico
Rodas 20'; Morales 25'; Castillo 56'	Report	Moreno 4'

Estadio Metropolitano Roberto Meléndez, Barranquilla, Colombia
July 23, 2006

Colombia	6 - 0	Jamaica
Pino 15'; Koo-Boothe 38' (o.g.); Quintero 60'; Guarín 67' (pen.); Moreno 82', 84'	Report

Estadio Pedro de Heredia, Cartagena, Colombia
Referee: (Mexico) Manuel Glower
July 23, 2006

Costa Rica	3 - 1	Panama
Arias 15'; Cunningham 35'; Ramírez 90+1'	Report	Torres 23'

Estadio Pedro de Heredia, Cartagena, Colombia

=== Semifinals ===
July 26, 2006

Costa Rica	0 - 0	Venezuela
	Report
Penalties
Carrillo (penalty missed); Stewart (penalty missed); Rodríguez (penalty missed)	0 - 3	(penalty missed) Vargas; Ospina; Rincón; Bosetti

Estadio Pedro de Heredia, Cartagena, Colombia
July 26, 2006

Colombia	1 - 0	Honduras
Moreno 57'	Report

Estadio Pedro de Heredia, Cartagena, Colombia

=== Third Place ===
July 29, 2006

Costa Rica	1 - 0	Honduras
Cunningham 19' (pen.)	Report

Estadio Pedro de Heredia, Cartagena, Colombia

=== Final ===
July 29, 2006

Colombia	2 - 1	Venezuela
Pino 40'; Briceño 49'	Report	Martínez 14' (o.g.)

Estadio Pedro de Heredia, Cartagena, Colombia
Referee: (El Salvador) Rodolfo Sibrian

2006 Central American and Caribbean Games

Colombia
2nd title

== Statistics ==
=== Goalscorers ===
There were 69 goals scored in 20 matches, for an average of 3.45 goals per match.

5 goals

- (Costa Rica) Kenny Cunningham
- (Colombia) Juan Pablo Pino

4 goals

- (Colombia) Dayro Moreno
- (Honduras) Ramón Castillo

3 goals

- (Colombia) Darwin Quintero

2 goals

- (Colombia) Fredy Guarín
- (Honduras) Carlos Arbizú
- (El Salvador) Cristian Esnal
- (Panama) Gabriel Torres

1 goal

- (Costa Rica) Ignacio Aguilar
- (Costa Rica) Yosimar Arias
- (Costa Rica) Rigo Ramírez
- (Colombia) Daniel Briceño
- (Colombia) Harrison Otálvaro
- (Colombia) Jackson Martínez
- (Jamaica) Richard West
- (Haiti) Alain Vubert
- (Honduras) Luis Rodas
- (Honduras) Erick Morales
- (Mexico) Héctor Moreno
- (Mexico) Ismael Valadéz
- (Panama) Edwin Aguilar
- (Panama) Roderick Brown
- (Panama) Ricardo Buitrago
- (Panama) Miguel Castillo Moreno
- (Venezuela) Jhon Jairo Ospina

3 own goals

- (Netherlands Antilles) Rowendy Sumter (against Panama)
- (Colombia) Jackson Martínez (against Venezuela)
- (Jamaica) Nathan Koo-Boothe (against Colombia)
