= Carlos Martín Briceño =

Mexican writer

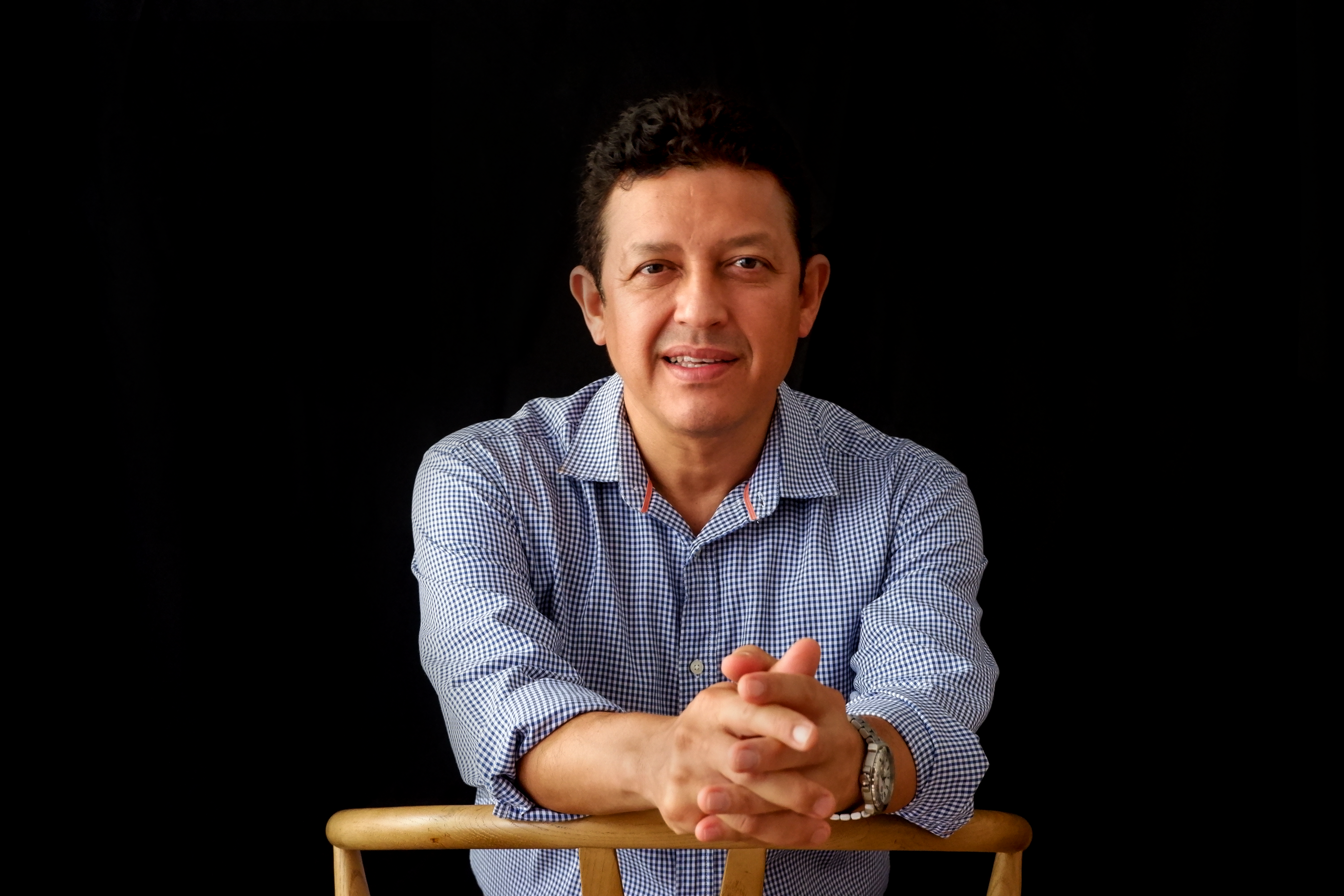
- Born: August 10, 1966 (age 59); Mérida, Yucatán, Mexico
- Years active: 2003-Actual
- Awards: Premio Nacional de cuento Beatriz Espejo; Premio Nacional de cuento de la Universidad Autónoma de Yucatán; Premio Internacional de cuento Max Aub; Premio Nacional de Literatura José Fuentes Mares
- Website: https://carlosmartinbriceno.com

Carlos Martín Briceño (Note: In this Spanish name, the first or paternal surname is Martín and the second or maternal family name is Briceño.) (born August 10, 1966) is a Mexican writer, narrator and essayist. He is a member of the National System of Art Creators of the Secretariat of Culture of Mexico.

== Life ==
Martín Briceño was born in Mérida, Yucatán, in 1966. He still lives here as he hates the cold and prefers the lifestyle.

Despite being known as a writer, Martín is a long-time businessman, known in southern Mexico. He majored in business administration in college, although he wanted to study literature. Despite the dark tones of his writing, his appearance is generally businesslike. He has been quoted saying that he considers having had two children in such a dark world to be a brave thing.

Martín does not find his work in business and literature to be particularly compatible. But he admits he has no desire to die hungry as a writer. While he does earn money as a writer, it is not enough.

== Writing career ==
Martin wanted to study literature when he went to college, but at that time such majors were not available in his region. One had to go to Mexico City. While it did delay having a writing career until the very late 20th century, the author believes it never would have prevented it completely.

He believes his origins as a writer began as a reader, and he began reading from a very young age. While he discovered earlier that he liked to tell stories as well as read them, what cemented the idea of becoming a writer was attending a storytelling workshop with writer Agustin Monsreal. Martin credits this teacher, along with Mexican writer Rafael Ramirez Heredia with giving him support in his very early career.

While he regularly gives workshops in Mérida, he states that to be a writer one needs three things: to read much, to learn technique and a lot of hard work and talent. Despite a heavy business schedule, he still tried to dedicate a couple of hours per day to writing and reads a couple of books per week.

In addition to writing and publishing his own works, he is also involved in the compilation of others’ work, especially writers from the Yucatán Peninsula. He is a member of the Centro Yucateco de Escritores and the editorial board of the Navegaciones Zur literary magazine.

Martin’s awards and other recognitions include an honorary mention at the Carmen Baez National Short Story Competition in Morelia (1999), the Beatriz Espejo National Short Story Prize (2003), the Yucatán Autonomous University National Prize (short story category, 2004) and an honorary mention at the San Luis Potosí National Short Story Competition (2008, for Caída Libre). His highest honor so far is the 2012 Max Aub International Short Story Prize (Spain) for Montezuma's Revenge, which he presented at the Mérida Fest.

Two of his publications, Caída Libre and Montezuma's Revenge were republished by the Reforma newspaper in Mexico City as part of its lists of best books in Mexico for 2010 and 2012.

== Literary style ==
Martin Briceño specializes in short stories and short novels. Common themes in his work include eroticism, life as part of a couple and the need for humans to have company. In many of his works, his protagonists’ main driving force is to avoid being alone. Influences on his work includes that of Beatriz Espejo, Gonzalo Rojas and John Banville. Authors that he also admires include Thomas Mann, Paul Auster, John Cheever, Hemingway, and Juan Rulfo but considers his style closer to that of Raymond Carver, Enrique Serna and Agustin Monsreal.

Author Rafael Ramirez Heredia wrote that Martin is a writer who does not appeal to conscience but rather profiles men and women and their passions, pain, loves and losses, leaning to humanity's darker side. He does not try to give any spiritual solace to readers, which leads segments of the reading public to reject his work. In fact, some of his own relatives do not come to his literary events because his work is so dark. For example, Montezuma's Revenge is a bloody and erotic story set in Mérida, Playa del Carmen and Holbox The following work, Montezuma's Revenge y otras deleites is a story of a Mexican man and foreign woman, studying mostly the dark aspects of Mexicans’ attitudes towards those from other countries.

== Major publications ==
Martin's work regularly appears in various types of publications and has been included in more than a dozen national and foreign anthologies.

Publications include:

=== Story ===
- (2003). Al final de la vigilia. Editorial Dante, Mérida 2003-SEP Libros del Rincón, México DF 2006. ISBN 970-605-417-0.
- (2006). Los mártires del Freeway y otras historias. Ficticia Editorial. ISBN 978-607-521-003-2. OCLC 1281983852
- (2010). Caída libre. ISBN 978-607-7693-79-6. OCLC 1304901662
- (2012). Montezuma's Revenge. Fundación Max Aub. ISBN 978-84-95418-87-6.
- (2014). Montezuma's Revenge y otros deleites. Ficticia Editorial. ISBN 978-607-521-036-0.
- (2017). De la vasta piel: antología personal. ISBN 978-607-521-081-0. OCLC 1027747972
- (2020). Toda felicidad nos cuesta muertos: cinco cuentos negros. ISBN 978-607-457-632-0. OCLC 1235906745

=== Novel ===
- (2017). La muerte del Ruiseñor. ISBN 978-607-529-367-7. OCLC 1296135616

=== Essay ===
- (2018). Viaje al centro de las letras. ISBN 978-607-521-099-5. OCLC 1110580043

=== Compilation ===
- (2017). Sureste antología de cuento contemporáneo de la Península Ficticia. ISBN 978-607-521-084-1. OCLC 1281890382
