= List of governors of Apure =

List of governors of Apure State, Venezuela

- State coat of arms

- Flag of the State
- Incumbent; Wilmer Rodríguez
- Style: Governor
- Status: Head of State
- Term length: Four years

This is a list of governors of the Venezuelan Apure State:

Until 1989, they were appointed by the president of Venezuela. Starting from that year they are elected in universal, direct and secret elections.

== Appointed governors ==
Date	Name
1862–1864	Gral. Napoleón Arteaga y Gral Julian Sosa
1864–1866	Gral. Juan Garcia
1866–1867	Gral. Cornelio Muñoz
1867–1868	Dr. Diego Chacón
1868	Gral. Gregorio Segovia
1868–1869	Gral. Felipe Parra
1869	Dr. Lisandro Diaz
1869	Gral. Cornelio Muñoz
1869–1870	Sr. Antonio Real
1870	Gral. Simón Egaña
1870–1871	Gral. Cosme Rodríguez
1871	Dr. Lisandro Díaz
1871–1872	Gral. Adolfo Olivo
1872	Gral. Alejandro Ibarra
1872–1873	Gral. Ignacio Avendaño
1873	Gral. Fortunato Vautrai
1873	Gral. Manuel Mendible
1873–1874	Gral. Cosme Rodriguez
1874–1876	Gral. Raimundo Fonseca
1876	Gral. Ignacio Avendaño
1876–1877	Gral. Raimundo Fonseca
1877	Gral. Federico Fonseca
1877	Gral. Raimundo Fonseca
1877	Gral. Francisco Arnao
1877–1878	Gral. Jose Galindez
1878–1879	Gral. Hermenegildo Perez
1879–1880	Gral. Raimundo Fonseca
1880	Gral. E. Pulgar
1880–1882	Gral. Raimundo Fonseca
1882	Gral. Jose Carrillo
1882	Sr. Juan Carrillo
1882–1892	Ninguno
1892–1899	Gral. Jose Galindez
1899–1900	Gral. Ignacio Avendaño
1900–1901	Gral. Francisco Parra
1901	Gral. Rafael Carabaño
1901–1903	Gral. Miguel Marquez
1903	Sr. Felipe Real
1903–1904	Dr. Guillermo Tell
1904–1905	Gral. Ignacio Quintana
1905–1910	Dr. Jose Gabaldon
1910–1911	Dr. Jose Núñez
1911–1915	Gral. Ignacio Quintana
1915–1921	Gral. Vicencio Perez
1921–1927	Dr. Hernán Pérez
1927–1931	Gral. Jose Domínguez
1931–1933	Dr. Francisco Parra
1933–1934	Gral. Jose Domínguez
1934–1935	Gral. Juan Ramirez
1935–1936	Cnel. Carlos Sanchez
1936	Gral. Alfredo Franco
1936	Dr. Temístocles Esteves
1936	Sr. Carlos Rodríguez
1936–1937	Dr. Saverio Barbarito
1937–1938	Sr. Carlos Arriaga
1938	Dr. Alejandro Rivas
1938–1939	Sr. Carlos Rodriguez
1939–1940	Sr. Antonio Este
1940	Sr. Carlos Diaz
1940–1941	Sr. Julio Montenegro
1941–1945	Sr. Carlos Rodriguez
1945	Sr. Juan Salerno
1945	Sr. Carlos Vivas
1945	Sr. Julio Sánchez
1945 - 1948	Dr. Pedro Hernández
1948 - 1958	Dr. Edgar Dominguez
1958	Dr. Humberto Barrios
1958 - 1959	Dr. Virgilio Leon
1959 - 1960	Sr. Rafael Castillo
1960 - 1961	Sr. Leónidas Monasterios
1961 - 1964	Sr. Octavio Viana
1964 - 1965	Prof. Héctor Saldeño
1965 - 1967	Sr. Ricardo Montilla
1967 - 1968	Sr. Julio Yanez
1968	Dr. Mauro Gonzalez
1968 - 1969	Dr. Jose Tirado
1969 - 1970	Dr. Gilmer Urdaneta
1970 - 1972	Sra. Carmen Morales De Valera
1972 - 1974	Dr. Amando Michelangelli
1974 - 1976	Dr. Eduardo Hernandez
1976 - 1979	Sr. Elias Castro
1979 - 1983	Sr. Rafael Bolivar
1983 - 1984	Dr. Ismael Colmenarez
1984 - 1986	Dr. Euclides Martinez
1986 - 1987	Econ. Pablo Marquez
1987	Dr. Rafael Marin
1987 - 1988	Econ. Jose Flores
1988 - 1989	Dr. Hugo Marquez

== Elected governors ==
Took office	Left office	Governor	Vote
1989	1992	José Gregorio Montilla, Acción Democrática	56.55
1992	1995	Marcelo Oquendo Rojo, Acción Democrática	53.24
1995	1998	José Gregorio Montilla, Acción Democrática	60.77
1998	1999	José Gregorio Montilla, Acción Democrática	54.25
1999	2000	Jesús Aguilarte, MVR	51.51
2000	2004	Luis Lippa, Acción Democrática	48.37
2004	2008	Jesús Aguilarte, MVR	66.85
2008	2011	Jesús Aguilarte, PSUV	56.97
2012	2017	Ramón Carrizales, PSUV	63.30
2017	2021	Ramón Carrizales, PSUV	52,13
2021	2024	Eduardo Piñate, PSUV	44,17
2024	2025	Wilmer Rodriguez, PSUV	
2025	2029	Wilmer Rodriguez, PSUV	96,19

== See also ==
- List of Venezuela governors
- Politics of Venezuela
- History of Venezuela
