= 2007 Venezuelan referendum protests =

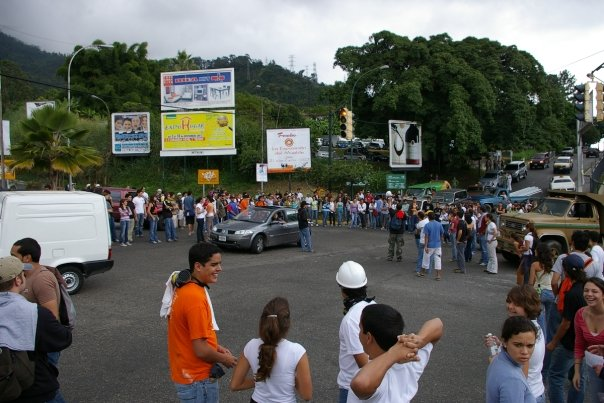
Students protesting against President Hugo Chávez's proposals for constitutional reform

Venezuelan protests for and against President Hugo Chávez's proposed 2 December constitutional referendum occurred after the National Assembly approved the referendum on 2 November 2007.

== Foundation of the Student Movement ==
Student activists have been mobilizing in Venezuela since as early as 1998. In 2002, the Red Democrática Universitaria Estudantil was founded, a national student federation. According to Rayma López, one of the prominent student leaders involved with the organization, "Student leaders met, but as the police intelligence harassed and prosecuted them, these meetings came to a halt."

The movement also experienced issues internally, as there was tension between groups of student from different universities.

== Closure of RCTV ==
In December 2006, President Chávez announced that he intended to shut down RCTV (Radio Caracas Televisión), the last of the country's private television channels, and there were immediate repercussions seen throughout the country. University and school students gathered nationwide and organized workshops of human rights principles; the intended closure "violated two human rights: freedom of expression and freedom of thought".

On 28 March 2007, the Venezuelan government failed to renew the broadcasting license of RCTV. In the days leading up to the decision, students from different universities around the country had already begun to gather in their campuses in protest. They believed that without RCTV, the people would be left without an objective source of information, since all other private channels had made treaties with the government about what to broadcast. On the day the announcement was made, student protests were violently broken up by the National Guard using teargas and blank rifle shots, while some students that protested were even shot at with live ammunition by Chávez supporters.

Several months later, the student movement was given the opportunity to present their beliefs to parliament when the Bolivarian political party Podemos (that had recently joined the opposition) fought for the students' right to raise their concerns. Student representatives spoke out at parliament on 7 June 2007, and the speeches were broadcast live on television and radio.

Douglas Barrios, a student leader from the Universidad Metropolitana, gave a speech in which he addressed the political neutrality of the student movement:

We are not neoliberals, we are liberated beings. We are not the opposition; we are a proposition. Youth is not on the streets today fighting for business interests or political tendencies. We are on the streets making politics without traditional politicians, fighting for our nation, protecting the interests of our society.

The broadcast was hugely helpful for the student movement, as they became much better known around the country because of the exposure they received in the media. The movement experienced an expansion and was forced to re-organize, cutting down from 127 student representatives to 8, in order to better and more efficiently reach consensus at meetings. These 8 representatives were chosen from eight universities in Caracas, while another committee held another 25 representatives, including leaders like Alexis Cabrera, Stalin Gonzáles, Fabricio Briceño, Ricardo Sánchez, Rayma López, Yon Goicoechea and Freddy Guevara.

The movement profited greatly from continued media coverage after the 28 March protests and the broadcast parliament speeches.

== Tactics ==
The student movement made use of symbols in their discourse, and they consistently tried to emphasize that their cause was not related or tied to any political or partisan ideology.

Most methods of protest were confrontational and peaceful, although in early June some government websites were hacked in protest of the RCTV closing.

=== Manos Blancas (White hands) ===
The movement stayed away from using colors that would have implied partisanship- Chavez's party has always clearly made use of the color red- and instead utilized white as a symbol of peace and freedom from labels and division. At rallies and protests, students would paint the palms of their hands white, as a call for peace and reconciliation amongst divided parties.

=== Resistencia (Resistance) ===
Resistencia, or resistance, was the phrase used specifically to challenge the constitutional amendments presented in the December 2007 referendum. Students generally took to peaceful methods of resistance, such as sit-ins and demonstrations, though confrontations with the police usually turned violent.

=== Key leaders ===
Several students played important roles in the 2007 protests, acting as the movement's representatives and speakers in the media. One important aspect of leadership was activity on social media platforms like Twitter, because there were few ways for groups to keep in contact other than through large outlets that couldn't be controlled by the government. Yon Goicoechea, Stalin González, and Ricardo Sánchez were well-known speakers and leaders who began publicizing the movement's activities on Twitter in 2009. Stalin González was the president of the Federación de Centros Universitarios, or Federation of University Centers, in 2006, from which he organized campaigns directed at addressing human and civil rights and how these were being treated by the government. Ricardo Sánchez succeeded him as president of the FCU in 2007 and 2008, and after much participation in the 2007 protests went on to become a substitute legislator who broke off from the Mesa de la Unidad Democrática opposition coalition. Perhaps most known in the media, Yon Goicoechea was one of the most prominent leaders after the 2007 referendum, though he received much negative attention, including death threats, after having received a $500,000 award from the Cato Institute, located in D.C.

== Transition from RCTV to referendum protests ==
In late June, RCTV managed to continue producing unofficial daily broadcasts by posting them on YouTube and running on a severely minimized staff, although the government refused to sway in their decision not to renew the channel's license. National protests calmed and quieted down as Chavez and his government continuously failed to address or acknowledge any of the protest activity.

The momentum that the student movement had picked up after the closing of RCTV was channeled into protests against Chavez's proposed national referendum, as the students believed that the 69 amendments on the ballot would give the president too much power over the government and the country. The referendum was rejected in the December elections, and RCTV's alternative broadcasting continued smoothly for the next two and a half years until 2010, when the channel did not air a speech made by President Chavez and therefore ran into trouble with laws that required Chavez's speeches to all be shown by cable companies and broadcast channels.

On November 2, a protest at the University of Zulia left 2 dead and 8 injured after hitmen attacked the student protests, the student affiliated with Justice First, Flavia Isapia, and one of the alleged hitmen ended up dead. In November 2007, demonstrations arose in Caracas, Venezuela and six other cities over the proposed constitutional changes. "Tens of thousands" of "Yes" voters marched in Caracas after the referendum had finally been approved on 2 November. At 8 November, protests at the Central University of Venezuela resulted in clashes between students and several masked gunmen, with several injuries; footage was caught on tape. In late November 2007, just days before the referendum, tens of thousands marched in Caracas for both the "Yes" and "No" votes. An opposition politician estimated the crowd marching for the "No" vote at 160,000. Protests were largely peaceful, and only one pro-government worker's death was reported.

Some of Chávez's supporters expressed concerns and disagreement with his proposals to change the constitution.

Many voters abstained in the vote, rather than cast a "No" vote against Chávez. The student movement played a crucial role in consolidating this position and in organizing numerous rallies. The student movement has played a large role in the Venezuelan political process, having gained a prominent position during the RCTV broadcast license expiration protests. Although the student movement is not limited to the opposition.

== See also ==
- Bolivarian Revolution
- Elections in Venezuela
