= David Ospina =

Colombian footballer (born 1988)

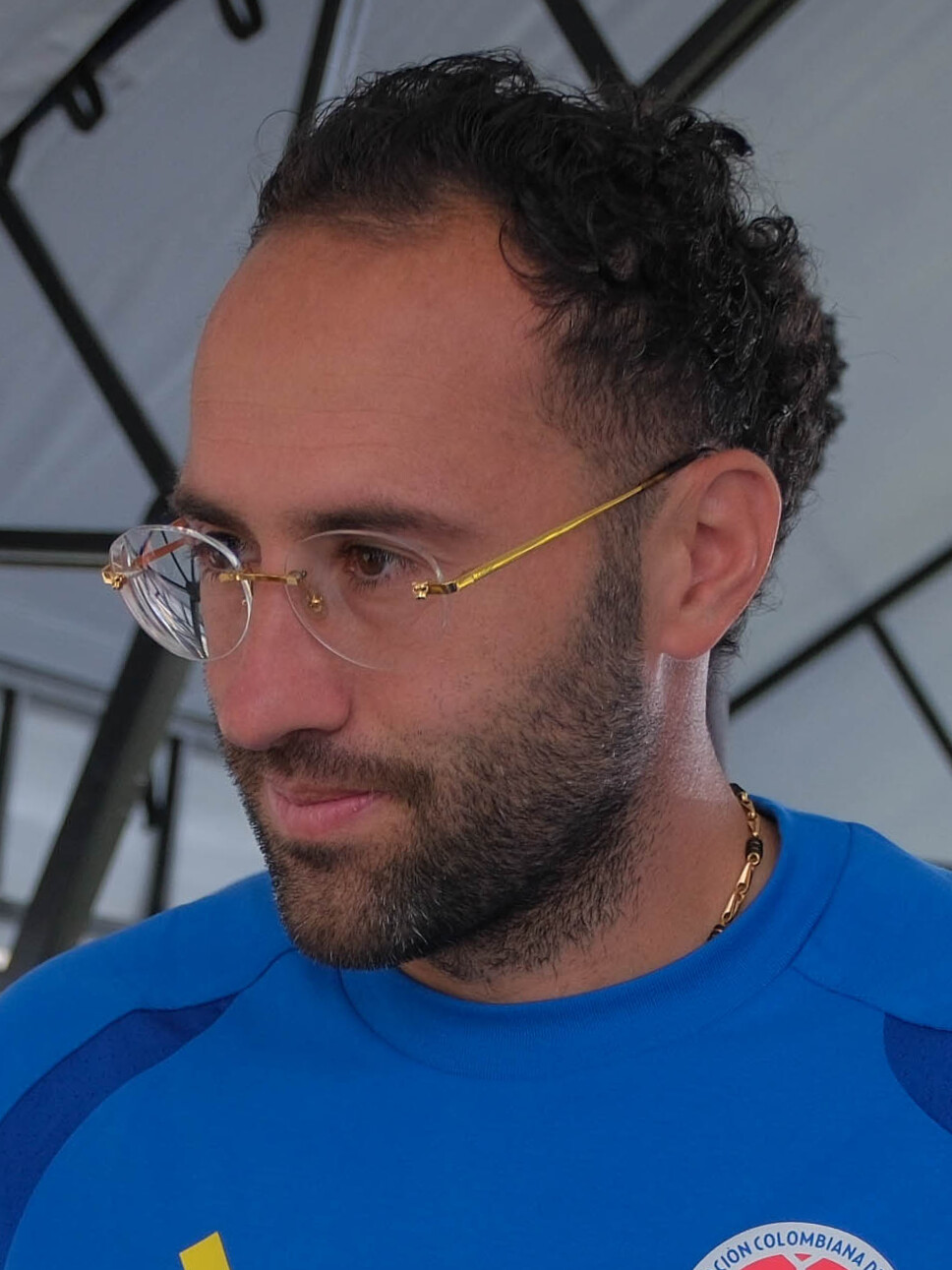
- Ospina with Colombia in 2026

Personal information
- Full name: David Ospina Ramírez
- Date of birth: 31 August 1988 (age 38)
- Place of birth: Medellín, Colombia
- Height: 1.83 m (6 ft 0 in)
- Position: Goalkeeper

Youth career
- Atlético Nacional

Senior career*
Years	Team	Apps	(Gls)
2005–2008	Atlético Nacional	97	(0)
2008–2014	Nice	189	(0)
2014–2019	Arsenal	29	(0)
2018–2019	→ Napoli (loan)	17	(0)
2019–2022	Napoli	64	(0)
2022–2024	Al Nassr	24	(0)
2024–2026	Atlético Nacional	57	(0)
2026	Atlante	0	(0)

International career
2005–2007	Colombia U20	12	(0)
2007–2026	Colombia	130	(0)
Medal record
Men's football
Representing Colombia
Copa América
Runner-up	2024 United States
Third place	2016 United States
Third place	2021 Brazil
Central American and Caribbean Games
Gold medal – first place	2006 Cartagena
- * Club domestic league appearances and goals

David Ospina Ramírez (born 31 August 1988) is a Colombian former professional footballer who played as a goalkeeper.

Ospina began his career at Atlético Nacional, making his debut with the club in 2005. After achieving two domestic titles. Ospina joined French side Nice. In 2014, he joined Arsenal on a four-year deal. During his time in London, Ospina won three trophies with the club: the FA Cup in 2015 and 2017, as well as the 2017 FA Community Shield. In 2018, Ospina was loaned out to Serie A club Napoli. The following year, Napoli permanently signed Ospina. In 2020, Ospina played a pivotal role in Napoli's conquering of the Coppa Italia. Following unsuccessful negotiations to renew his contract with Napoli, Ospina signed for Saudi Pro League side Al Nassr in 2022. In 2024, he returned to his home country, rejoining Atlético Nacional, with whom he won the Copa Colombia for the first time in his career.

Ospina represented Colombia at full international level between 2007 and 2026. At youth level, he was part of Colombia's squad at the 2005 FIFA World Youth Championship and won gold medals at the 2005 Bolivarian Games and the 2006 Central American and Caribbean Games. He made his senior debut in a friendly against Uruguay in February 2007, and went on to make 130 appearances, making him Colombia's second-most capped player after James Rodríguez. In total, he appeared at five Copa América and three FIFA World Cup tournaments.

== Club career ==
=== Early career ===
==== Atlético Nacional ====
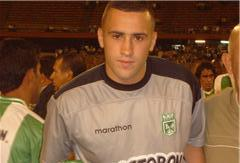
David Ospina with Atlético Nacional in 2008

David Ospina came through the youth system of Atlético Nacional and made his senior debut in the Categoría Primera A in 2005 at the age of 17. He was part of the Atlético Nacional squad that won the 2005 Torneo Apertura, giving him his first league title with the club.

By 2007, Ospina had established himself as Atlético Nacional's first-choice goalkeeper. Under coach Óscar Héctor Quintabani, the team completed a domestic double that year by winning both the Apertura and Finalización tournaments, including a 2–1 aggregate victory over Atlético Huila in the Apertura final.

=== OGC Nice ===
David Ospina joined OGC Nice in the summer of 2008, arriving from Atlético Nacional at the age of 19 to succeed Hugo Lloris, who had departed for Olympique Lyonnais.

==== First-choice goalkeeper (2009–2012) ====
From the 2009–10 season onwards, Ospina became Nice's undisputed first-choice goalkeeper, starting the vast majority of the club's league fixtures across three consecutive campaigns. Over this period, Nice fluctuated between mid-table and the lower half of Ligue 1, finishing 15th in 2009–10, 17th in 2010–11, and 13th in 2011–12, with Ospina a consistent presence throughout.

==== 2012–13 season ====
The 2012–13 season represented the high point of Ospina's time at Nice. Under coach Claude Puel, the club finished fourth in Ligue 1 with 64 points — described by ESPN as Nice becoming "the revelation of French football" that season — qualifying for the UEFA Europa League. Ospina made 26 league appearances in the campaign, keeping goal for a side that pushed Olympique Lyonnais to the wire for third place.

==== Final season (2013–14) ====
In 2013–14, his final season with the club, Nice struggled, finishing 17th in Ligue 1 and narrowly avoiding relegation. Ospina remained a regular starter throughout the campaign, completing his sixth and final season with the club. Across six years at Nice, he made 189 appearances in Ligue 1.

=== Arsenal ===
On 27 July 2014, Arsenal confirmed the signing of Ospina from Nice for a reported fee of around £3 million, on a long-term contract. He was assigned the number 13 shirt, previously worn by Emiliano Viviano.

==== 2014–15 season ====
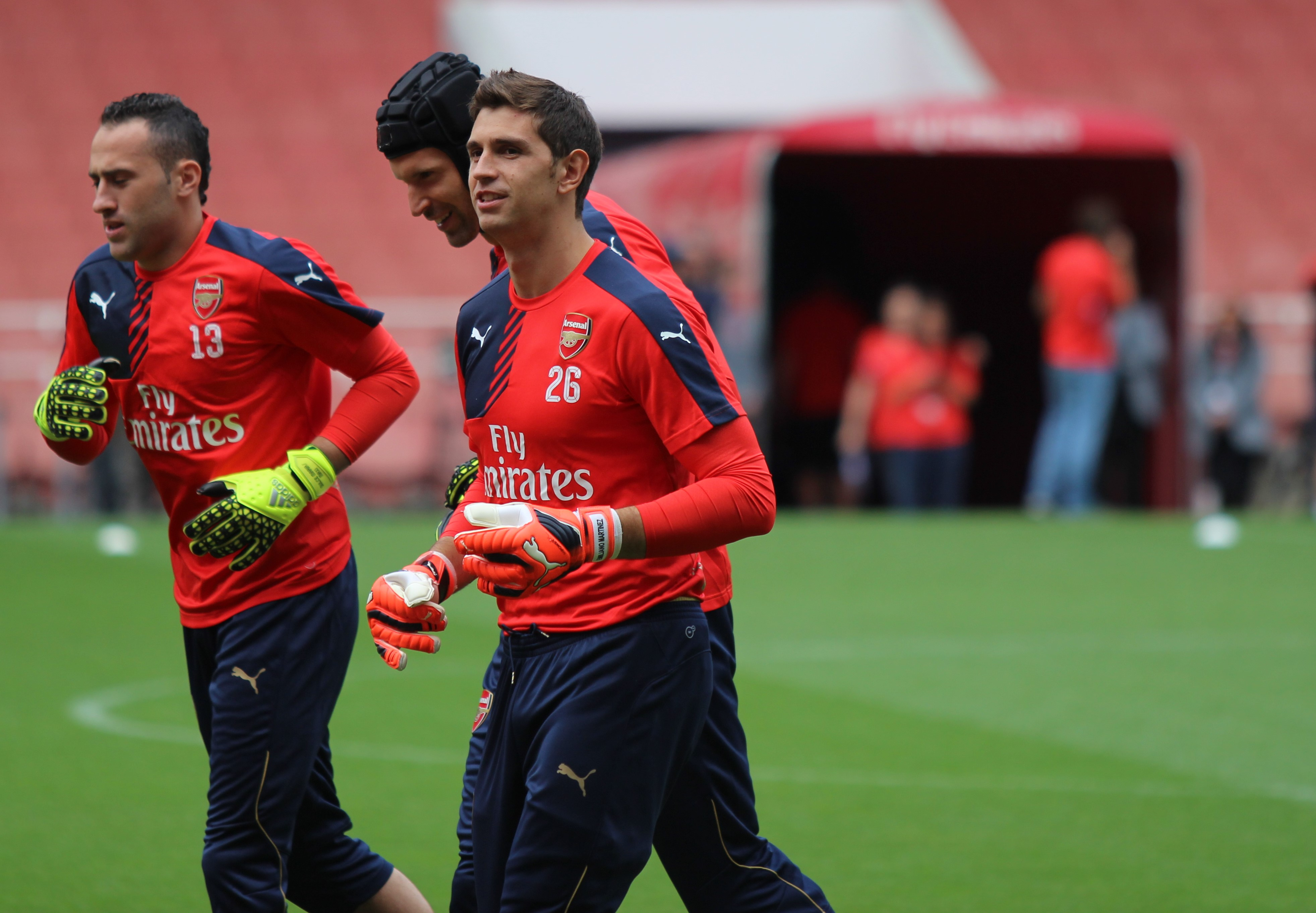
David Ospina training alongside his Arsenal teammates Petr Čech and Emiliano Martínez in 2015

Ospina made his competitive debut on 23 September 2014 in a 2–1 League Cup defeat to Southampton at the Emirates Stadium. His UEFA Champions League debut came on 1 October 2014, when he replaced the red-carded Wojciech Szczęsny against Galatasaray; he kept Arsenal secure as Danny Welbeck completed a hat-trick in a 4–1 victory.

Ospina sustained a thigh injury in October 2014 that ruled him out for several months. On his return, he kept a clean sheet in a 3–0 Premier League win over Stoke City on 11 January 2015. Following disciplinary issues involving Szczęsny, Ospina became the regular Premier League starter for the remainder of the season. He was an unused substitute in Arsenal's 4–0 victory over Aston Villa in the 2015 FA Cup final.

His performances during the 2014–15 season earned him a place on the 59-man FIFA Ballon d'Or 2015 longlist.

==== 2015–16 season ====
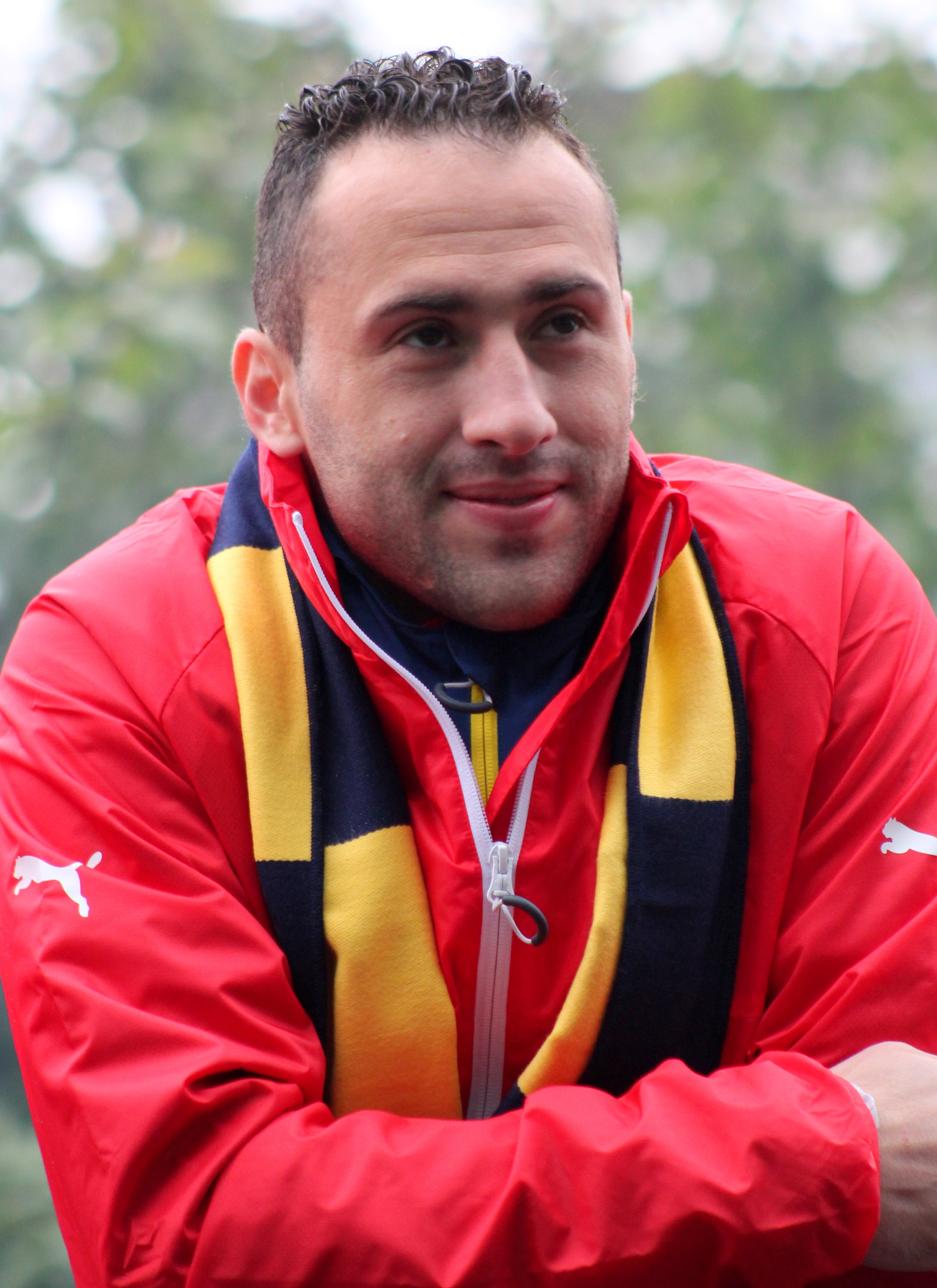
David Ospina with Arsenal after winning the 2015 FA Cup final

Ospina started Arsenal's opening UEFA Champions League group stage match, a 2–1 defeat to Dinamo Zagreb, in which his initial save rebounded unluckily in off a teammate for the opening goal. He also started a League Cup win over Tottenham Hotspur.

In the following Champions League group match against Olympiakos, Ospina made a costly error — dropping a corner into his own net — as Arsenal lost 3–2 at home, putting their progression in jeopardy. He was subsequently removed from Champions League duties. Ospina also suffered a shoulder injury during international duty that sidelined him for several weeks.

==== 2016–17 season ====
Ospina served as Arsenal's designated cup goalkeeper, starting the opening UEFA Champions League group stage match away at Paris Saint-Germain. His performance — which included several key saves against Edinson Cavani — drew widespread praise; his efforts were described as having "justified his Champions League selection" and Wenger as having hailed the display. Arsenal drew 1–1, with Alexis Sánchez scoring a late equaliser.

He started all of Arsenal's matches in their 2016–17 FA Cup run. In the final at Wembley Stadium, Arsenal beat Chelsea 2–1, with Ospina starting in goal after Petr Čech was ruled out through injury.

==== 2017–18 season ====
Ospina remained Arsenal's designated goalkeeper for the UEFA Europa League and domestic cup competitions. In the Europa League group stage opener against FC Cologne on 14 September 2017 — a match delayed by over an hour due to crowd trouble caused by thousands of travelling German supporters — Arsenal fell behind before recovering to win 3–1.

In the round of 16, Arsenal won 2–0 away at AC Milan at the San Siro on 8 March 2018, coming off the back of four consecutive defeats in all competitions. Arsenal progressed through the quarter-finals against CSKA Moscow but were eliminated at the semi-final stage by Atlético Madrid, losing 2–1 on aggregate. The Guardian described Ospina as having "instilled little confidence" in the second leg, though he made a late save to keep the deficit to a single goal.

=== Napoli ===
Following the arrival of Bernd Leno at Arsenal, Ospina sought a move to secure more consistent playing time. On 15 August 2018, Serie A club Napoli agreed a season-long loan deal with an option to buy, with the move influenced by an injury to newly signed Napoli goalkeeper Alex Meret.

==== 2018–19 season ====
Ospina quickly established himself as first choice under manager Carlo Ancelotti, making 17 Serie A appearances during the loan spell. On 17 March 2019, Ospina suffered a serious head injury after a collision with Udinese striker Ignacio Pussetto during a Serie A match. Despite initially continuing with a bandage, he collapsed before half-time and was stretchered off and hospitalised. He was discharged the following day after scans revealed no serious damage. The incident prompted wider discussion about football's handling of head injuries.

On 4 July 2019, Napoli exercised their option, permanently signing Ospina from Arsenal for a reported fee of around €3.5 million.

==== 2019–20 season ====
Ospina rotated with Alex Meret during the 2019–20 campaign but became the preferred starter under manager Gennaro Gattuso, with the Colombian's superior ball distribution suiting Gattuso's style of play. A pivotal moment came in the Coppa Italia semi-final second leg against Inter Milan. With Napoli leading 1–0 from the first leg, their advantage was wiped out when Christian Eriksen scored directly from a corner, eluding Ospina. However, Ospina recovered to make several crucial saves — including denying Romelu Lukaku and Antonio Candreva — before assisting Dries Mertens' winning goal with a long clearance. Having been booked in the semi-final, Ospina was suspended for the final, in which Alex Meret started as Napoli beat Juventus 4–2 on penalties after a 0–0 draw to win the Coppa Italia.

==== 2020–21 season ====
Ospina remained a key figure in 2020–21, continuing to feature regularly in Serie A under Gattuso. Napoli narrowly missed UEFA Champions League qualification that season, finishing fifth in Serie A.

==== 2021–22 season ====
Ospina's final season at Napoli proved to be his most active under new manager Luciano Spalletti, who took charge in July 2021. Napoli mounted a serious title challenge, finishing third in Serie A and remaining in contention until the latter stages of the campaign. At the end of the season, Ospina departed as a free agent.

=== Al Nassr ===
After leaving Napoli as a free agent in 2022, Ospina joined Al Nassr of the Saudi Pro League. In July 2022, the Asian Football Confederation reported that he had signed a two-year contract with the Riyadh club.

Ospina began the 2022–23 season as Al Nassr's first-choice goalkeeper. In January 2023 he suffered a fracture-dislocation of his right elbow during a league match against Al-Shabab, leaving the field on a stretcher and subsequently undergoing surgery. The injury restricted his appearances for Al Nassr during the remainder of his time in Saudi Arabia.

==== 2023–24 season ====
The elbow injury Ospina suffered in January 2023 restricted his appearances for Al Nassr during the remainder of his time in Saudi Arabia. He nonetheless started the King's Cup final against Al-Hilal, but was sent off in the 56th minute after handling the ball outside his area to deny a breakaway by Malcom, leaving his side with ten men. Despite Ospina's red card, the match ended 1–1 after extra time, before Al-Hilal won 4–2 on penalties.

Earlier in the same campaign Al Nassr had won the Arab Club Champions Cup for the first time, with Ronaldo scoring twice in a 2–1 extra-time victory over Al-Hilal in August 2023.

At the end of the 2023–24 season, Ospina departed Al Nassr upon the expiry of his contract.

=== Return to Atlético Nacional ===
Ospina returned to Atlético Nacional in 2024, sixteen years after his initial departure. The club announced his signing in June 2024, describing it as the homecoming of one of their most notable academy graduates. He agreed a contract running until 2026, returning from the Middle East as a free agent after his spell with Al Nassr.

In June 2026, Ospina departed Atlético Nacional upon the expiry of his contract.

=== Atlante ===
After leaving Atlético Nacional, in July 2026, Ospina signed with Liga MX club Atlante. However, the club put in their relationship with him on hiatus as he dealt with an injury.

== International career ==
=== Youth career ===
Ospina progressed through Colombia's youth setup and was called up to the under-20 squad for the 2005 FIFA World Youth Championship in the Netherlands. Although he did not make an appearance during the tournament, Colombia reached the Round of 16. Two years later, he was the first-choice goalkeeper for the 2007 South American U-20 Championship in Paraguay, where Colombia failed to qualify for that year's FIFA World Youth Championship.

=== Senior career ===
Ospina made his senior debut for the Colombia national football team as a substitute on 7 February 2007 in a friendly defeat against Uruguay.

==== 2014 FIFA World Cup ====
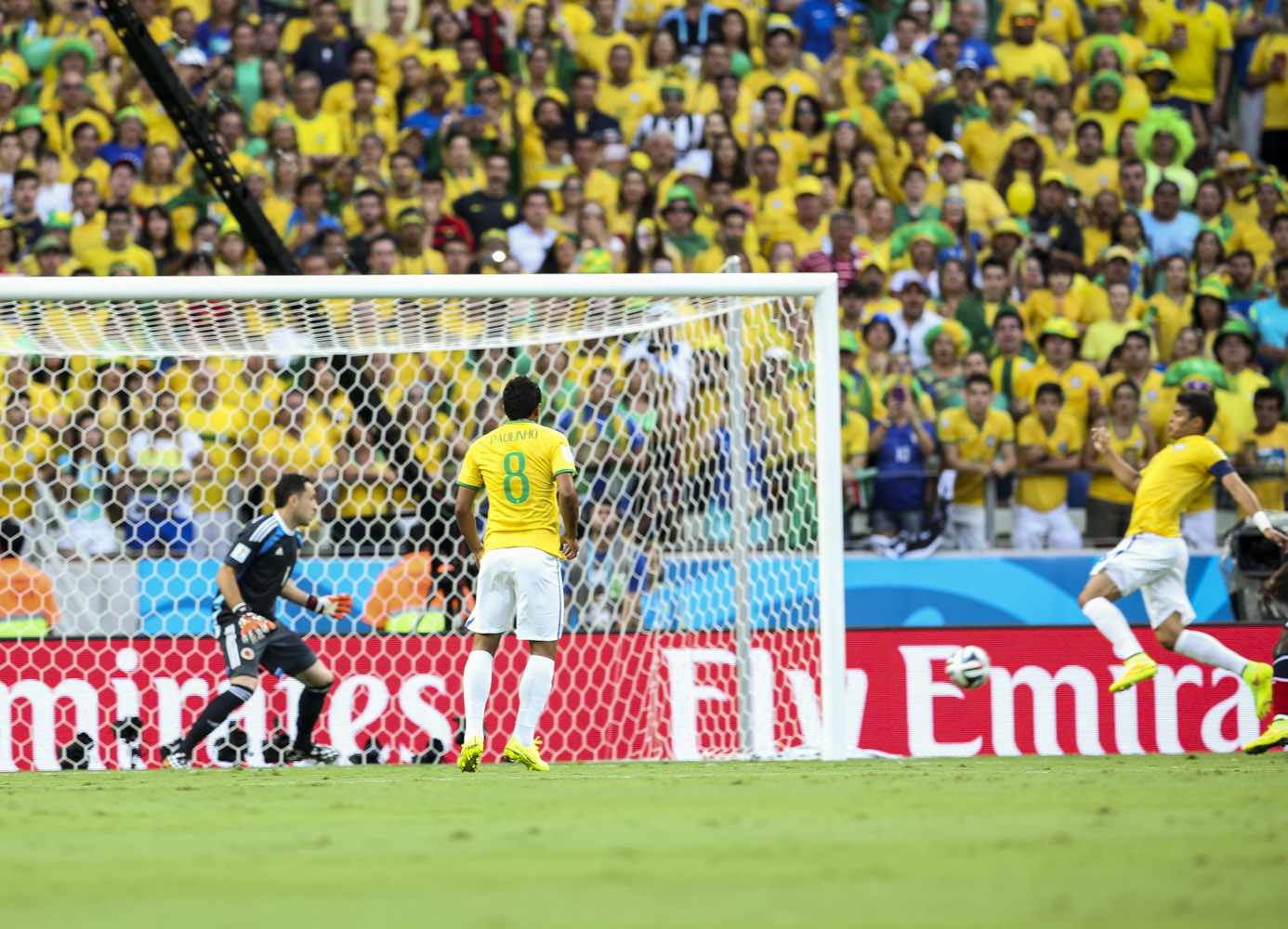
Ospina in action during the quarter-finals of the 2014 FIFA World Cup against Brazil

Ospina played every minute of Colombia's five matches at the 2014 FIFA World Cup in Brazil, their first World Cup since 1998. Colombia reached the quarter-finals, where they were eliminated 2–1 by the hosts, with a David Luiz free-kick proving the decisive moment.

==== 2015 Copa América ====
Ospina started every match as Colombia's goalkeeper at the 2015 Copa América in Chile. In the quarter-finals against Argentina, he produced a series of crucial saves — denying Sergio Agüero, Lionel Messi and Nicolás Otamendi — to keep the score goalless through 90 minutes. Colombia ultimately lost 5–4 in a penalty shootout.

==== 2016 Copa América Centenario ====
At the Copa América Centenario in the United States, Ospina was instrumental in Colombia reaching the semi-finals. Against Peru in the quarter-finals, he made a crucial flying save in the penalty shootout as Colombia won 4–2 on spot-kicks after a goalless draw; Peru's final kick went over the bar to confirm Colombia's progress, their first semi-final appearance since 2004. Colombia finished third in the tournament.

==== 2018 FIFA World Cup ====
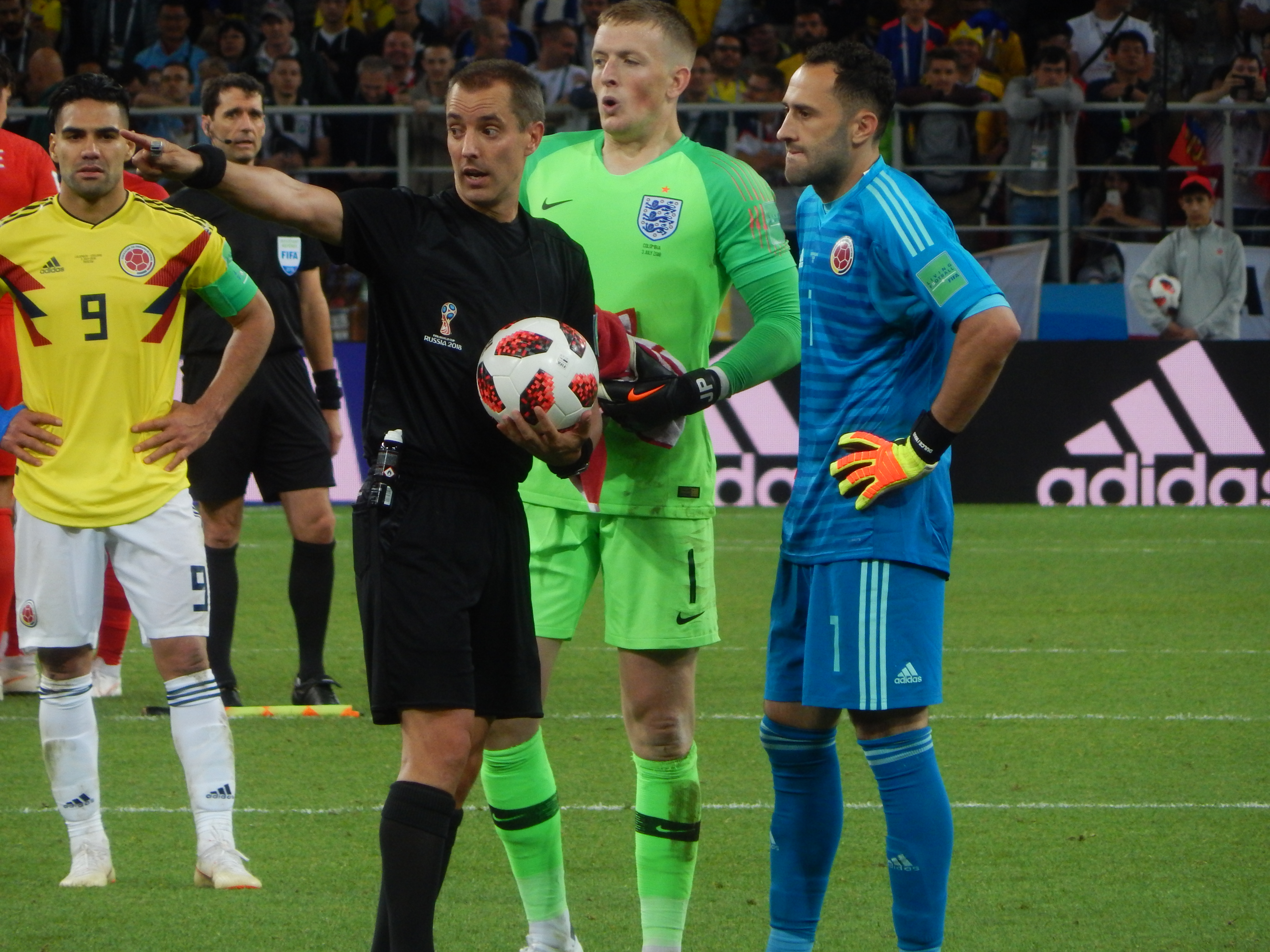
Ospina (right, in blue) during the penalty shoot-out against England in the 2018 FIFA World Cup Round of 16

Ospina started every match for Colombia at the 2018 FIFA World Cup in Russia, where they reached the Round of 16. Against England, he saved Jordan Henderson's penalty in the shootout, though Colombia were ultimately eliminated 4–3 on spot-kicks after a 1–1 draw that saw Yerry Mina equalise in the 93rd minute.

==== 2021 Copa América ====
At the 2021 Copa América in Brazil, Ospina saved two penalties in the quarter-final shootout against Uruguay, helping Colombia advance 4–2 on spot-kicks after a goalless draw. The win also saw him overtake Carlos Valderrama as Colombia's most-capped player with 112 international appearances at the time. Colombia went on to finish third, beating Peru 3–2 in a dramatic play-off.

==== 2024 Copa América ====
Ospina was included in Colombia's squad for the 2024 Copa América in the United States, with Camilo Vargas serving as first-choice goalkeeper throughout the tournament. Colombia reached the final, where they were beaten by Argentina.

==== 2026 FIFA World Cup ====
On 25 May 2026, Ospina was named in Colombia's 26-man squad for the 2026 FIFA World Cup.

== Style of play ==
An agile, athletic, and acrobatic shot-stopper, Ospina was known for his reflexes and his technical ability with his feet, as well as his distribution and ability to produce accurate throws, which allowed him to play the ball out from the back and start attacks. Considered by pundits to be a promising goalkeeper in his youth, his former Nice manager, Frédéric Antonetti, once described him as an "international-standard goalkeeper," also stating: "He has everything you need to be a top goalkeeper. He's good in the air and he's good on the ground. He has that little extra something to be a champion. Hugo Lloris was an international-standard goalkeeper; so is David." He is also known for his reserved character and calm demeanour on the pitch. Although he was criticised in the media during his earlier career for being prone to rash errors, while his ability to command his area and decision-making about when to come off his line also came into question, he was able to improve in these areas as his career progressed due to his work-rate, in particular in his speed when rushing off his line and getting to ground to smother the ball – which makes him effective in one on one situations –, or when dealing with crosses; as such, he has been described by journalists as a "sweeper keeper," due to his playing style and ability to rush out of goal.

However, despite his all-round improvement as he entered his prime, his tendency to commit errors has persisted, which has been a source of scrutiny from pundits. Standing at 1.83 m (6 ft), Ospina is not particularly tall for a goalkeeper; as such, his lack of height has occasionally limited him in the air at times, despite his bravery. He has also been accused of being inconsistent and unreliable in the media, despite his excellent and consistent performances at international level. Consequently, critical reception of Ospina has been divided; while his former Arsenal manager Wenger labelled him as the "best goalkeeper in the Premier League" in 2015, and as "a world-class goalkeeper" in 2016, Michael Cummings of Bleacher Report instead stated in 2015 that "Ospina is not a top-class goalkeeper," despite performing well for Arsenal since earning the starting role over Szczęsny earlier that year. Former Arsenal goalkeeper Bob Wilson instead described him as a "solid keeper" in 2018.

== Personal life ==
Ospina was brother-in-law to fellow Colombian international footballer James Rodríguez, who married David's sister Daniela in 2011. However, they announced their separation in July 2017. Ospina has been married to Colombian model Jesica Sterling since 2012, and has two children.

Ospina acquired French nationality by naturalization in June 2014.

== Career statistics ==
=== Club ===
Appearances and goals by club, season and competition
Club	Season	League			National cup (Note: Includes Coupe de France, FA Cup, Coppa Italia, King's Cup, Copa Colombia)		League cup (Note: Includes Coupe de la Ligue, Football League/EFL Cup)		Continental		Other		Total	
Club	Season	Division	Apps	Goals	Apps	Goals	Apps	Goals	Apps	Goals	Apps	Goals	Apps	Goals
Atlético Nacional	2006	Categoría Primera A	34	0	0	0	—		1 (Note: Appearance(s) in Copa Libertadores)	0	—		35	0
Atlético Nacional	2007	Categoría Primera A	47	0	0	0	—		4 (Note: Appearance(s) in Copa Sudamericana)	0	—		51	0
Atlético Nacional	2008	Categoría Primera A	16	0	0	0	—		7	0	—		23	0
Atlético Nacional	Total		97	0	0	0	—		12	0	—		109	0
Nice	2008–09	Ligue 1	25	0	0	0	2	0	—		—		27	0
Nice	2009–10	Ligue 1	37	0	1	0	0	0	—		—		38	0
Nice	2010–11	Ligue 1	35	0	0	0	1	0	—		—		36	0
Nice	2011–12	Ligue 1	37	0	0	0	1	0	—		—		38	0
Nice	2012–13	Ligue 1	26	0	0	0	2	0	—		—		28	0
Nice	2013–14	Ligue 1	29	0	1	0	0	0	2 (Note: Appearance(s) in UEFA Europa League)	0	—		32	0
Nice	Total		189	0	2	0	6	0	2	0	—		199	0
Arsenal	2014–15	Premier League	18	0	1	0	1	0	3 (Note: Appearances in UEFA Champions League)	0	—		23	0
Arsenal	2015–16	Premier League	4	0	4	0	1	0	3	0	—		12	0
Arsenal	2016–17	Premier League	2	0	4	0	0	0	8	0	—		14	0
Arsenal	2017–18	Premier League	5	0	1	0	5	0	10	0	—		21	0
Arsenal	Total		29	0	10	0	7	0	24	0	—		70	0
Napoli (loan)	2018–19	Serie A	17	0	1	0	—		6	0	—		24	0
Napoli	2019–20	Serie A	17	0	4	0	—		2	0	—		23	0
Napoli	2020–21	Serie A	16	0	3	0	—		3	0	1 (Note: Appearance in Supercoppa Italiana)	0	23	0
Napoli	2021–22	Serie A	31	0	1	0	—		1	0	—		33	0
Napoli	Total		81	0	9	0	—		12	0	1	0	103	0
Al Nassr	2022–23	Saudi Pro League	13	0	1	0	—		—		0	0	14	0
Al Nassr	2023–24	Saudi Pro League	11	0	2	0	—		1 (Note: Appearance in AFC Champions League)	0	1 (Note: Appearance in Saudi Super Cup)	0	15	0
Al Nassr	Total		24	0	3	0	—		1	0	1	0	29	0
Atlético Nacional	2024	Categoría Primera A	12	0	6	0	—		—		—		18	0
Atlético Nacional	2025	Categoría Primera A	33	0	5	0	—		7	0	1 (Note: Appearance in Superliga Colombiana)	0	46	0
Atlético Nacional	2026	Categoría Primera A	12	0	0	0	—		1	0	—		13	0
Atlético Nacional	Total		57	0	11	0	—		8	0	1	0	77	0
Atlante	2026–27	Liga MX	0	0	—		—		—		0	0	0	0
Career total			477	0	35	0	13	0	59	0	3	0	587	0

=== International ===
Appearances and goals by national team and year
National team	Year	Apps	Goals
Colombia	2007	1	0
Colombia	2008	1	0
Colombia	2009	8	0
Colombia	2010	5	0
Colombia	2011	8	0
Colombia	2012	8	0
Colombia	2013	10	0
Colombia	2014	8	0
Colombia	2015	12	0
Colombia	2016	14	0
Colombia	2017	8	0
Colombia	2018	11	0
Colombia	2019	10	0
Colombia	2020	1	0
Colombia	2021	16	0
Colombia	2022	6	0
Colombia	2023	1	0
Colombia	2024	0	0
Colombia	2025	1	0
Colombia	2026	1	0
Total		130	0

== Honours ==
Atlético Nacional

- Categoría Primera A: 2005 Apertura, 2007 Apertura, 2007 Finalización,2024 Finalización
- Copa Colombia: 2024, 2025
- Superliga Colombiana: 2025

Arsenal

- FA Cup: 2014–15, 2016–17
- FA Community Shield: 2017
- EFL Cup runner-up: 2017–18

Napoli

- Coppa Italia: 2019–20

Colombia U20

- Central American and Caribbean Games: 2006

Colombia

- Copa América runner-up: 2024; third place: 2016, 2021

== See also ==
- List of men's footballers with 100 or more international caps
