= Francisco Hernáiz =

Venezuelan military officer and political figure

- Born: October 4, 1797; San Juan, Puerto Rico
- Died: February 23, 1866 (aged 68); Caracas, Venezuela
- Spouse: Dolores Soublette Buroz
- Military career
- Allegiance: Gran Colombia; Venezuela
- Branch: Venezuelan Army
- Rank: Rear admiral

Francisco Hernáiz (born Francisco de Asis Hernáiz y Segura) was a Venezuelan military officer and political figure during the 19th century. Born in Puerto Rico he achieved the rank of Rear admiral and performed his duty as Secretary of War and Navy (Ministry of Defense) during the governments of José Antonio Páez, José María Vargas and Carlos Soublette. His name figures among the Navy Forefathers of Venezuela.

== Family life ==
The son of Ramon Hernaiz y Garizabal and Maria Concepcion Segura y Mirrier, was born October 4, 1797, in San Juan de Puerto Rico. In 1823, Hernáiz moved to Venezuela where he joined the military forces of Gran Colombia. On March 17, 1830, he married the daughter of General Carlos Soublette, Dolores Soublette Buroz. Eight children were conceived from this marriage: Francisca, Carlos, Concepción, Ramón, Manuel and Dolores Hernáiz Soublette originating an extensive number of prominent caraquenian families: Parra Hernáiz, Parra Sanojo, Parra Penzini, Duarte Parra, Hernáiz de las Casas, Hernáiz Padrón, Díaz Hernáiz, Hernáiz Pietri, Chumaceiro Díaz, Melior Díaz, Díaz Rodríguez, Hernáiz Reyna, Benítez Hernáiz, Avendaño Hernáiz, Lander Avendaño, Casanova Avendaño, Razzetti Avendaño, Pérez Avendaño, Hernáiz Sorondo, Hernáiz Berti, Hernáiz Yanes, Hernáiz Landáez, Hernáiz Arnal, Miranda Hernáiz, Barreto Hernáiz, Hernáiz Dalla Costa, Becerra Hernáiz y Pardo Becerra among others. Francisco Hernáiz dies in Caracas on February 23, 1866.

== Military and political life ==
He undertook military and naval studies in Spain. After graduation, he is called to duty in Mexico where he obtained the rank of Lieutenant junior . In 1823, Hernaiz joined the maritime force of the Gran Colombia in the grade of Lieutenant. He was assigned to perform the role of Major acting of the Naval Second Department stationed in Puerto Cabello. After de dissolution of the Gran Colombia, he performs his duties as Secretary of War and Navy (Ministry of Defense (Venezuela) |Ministry of Defense ) between 1834 and 1835 as interim during the government of José Antonio Páez. In 1836, during the Coup d'état against José María Vargas known as Revolution of the Reforms or "The Carujada", Hernaiz joins the conservative militants loyal to the government. In 1836, after Vargas resigned from the presidency, Hernaiz took on the helm of the once again in 1836 during the second term of Paez. In 1848, during the attempt to overthrow José Tadeo Monagas by Paez, knowns as "the Venezuelan Civil War of 1848–1849", Hernaiz fought among the paecistas which would eventually be defeated. After a decade devoted to agricultural activities in his farm in Valles del Tuy, Hernaiz returns to governmental affairs during the Federal War between 1862 and 1863, once more serving as Secretary of War and Navy with the president Pedro Gual and backing up Paez dictatorship, in which time he embarked on diplomatic missions in front British authorities in the island of Trinidad. In 1864, he was recognized with the grade of Major General of the Navy (Rear admiral) by the Government of Juan Crisóstomo Falcón.
