= Briseño =

Briseño (also anglicized as Briseno) is a Spanish surname. Notable people with the surname include:

- Alberto Medina Briseño (born 1983), Mexican footballer
- Antonio Briseño (born 1994), Mexican footballer
- Gilberto Landeros Briseño, Mexican military personnel
- Guadalupe Briseño (1933–2024), American civil rights activist and the leader of the Kitayama Carnation Strike
- Humberto Briseño Sierra (1914–2003), Mexican lawyer
- José Luis Briones Briseño (born 1963), Mexican politician
- Severiano Briseño (1902–1988), Mexican composer

== See also ==
- Briceño, the more popular variant
