= Raúl Baduel =

Venezuelan military officer and politician (1955–2021)

Raúl Isaías Baduel
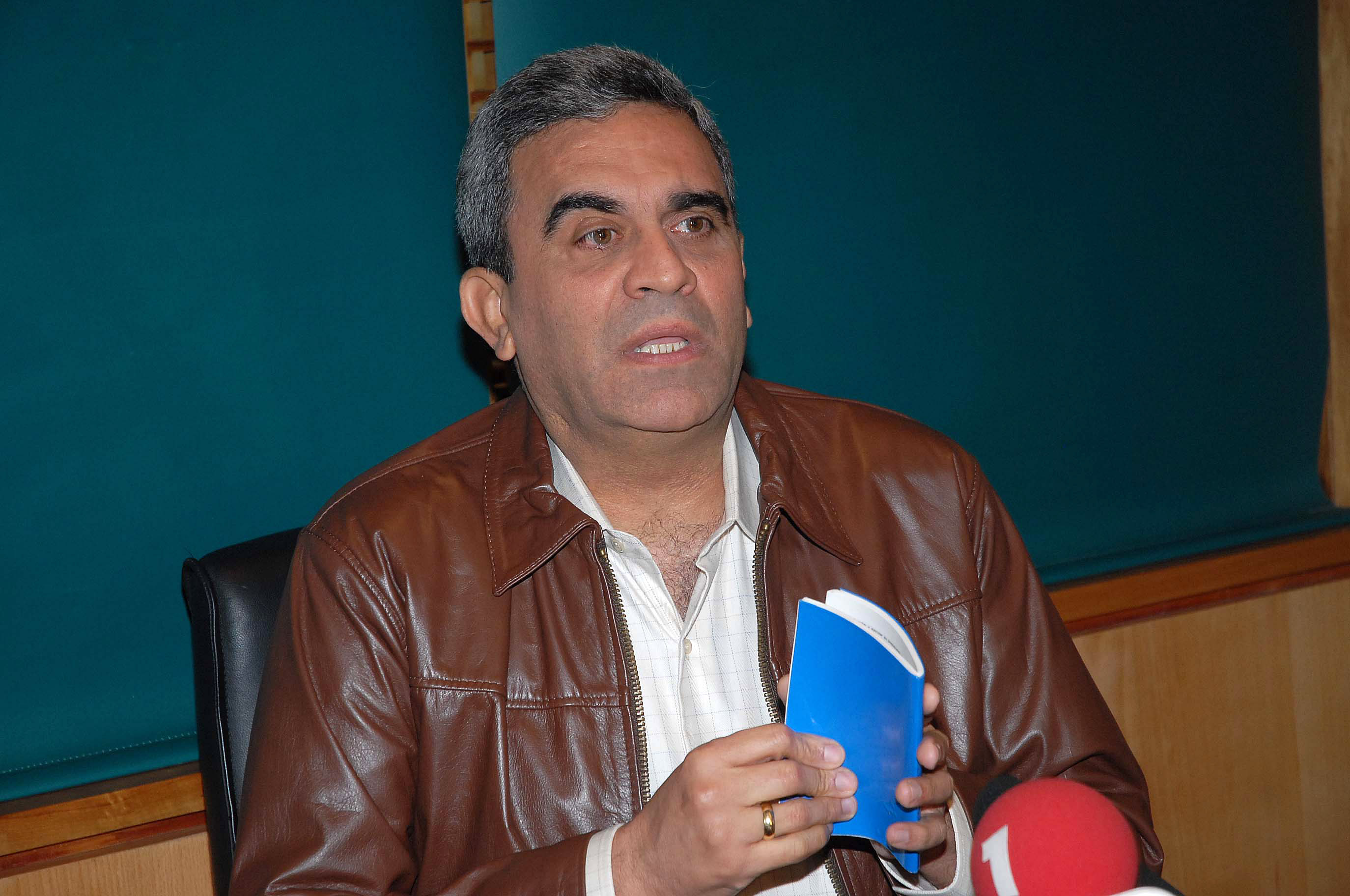
- Baduel announcing his concerns over the Venezuelan constitutional referendum in 2007

Minister of Defense
- In office 25 December 2006 – January 2008
- President: Hugo Chavez
- Preceded by: Jorge Luis García Carneiro
- Succeeded by: Gustavo Rangel Briceño

Personal details
- Born: 6 July 1955 Las Mercedes, Guárico, Venezuela
- Died: 12 October 2021 (aged 66) Caracas, Venezuela
- Party: United Socialist Party of Venezuela

Military service
- Allegiance: Venezuelan Armed Forces
- Years of service: 1976–2007
- Rank: General in Chief
- Commands: Defense Minister

Raúl Isaías Baduel (6 July 1955 – 12 October 2021) was a Venezuelan politician, general, and defense minister under President Hugo Chávez. He was a member of Chavez' MBR-200, joining in December 1982.

== Career ==
=== Military ===
Baduel was instrumental in restoring Chávez to power after the 2002 Venezuelan coup d'état attempt, and was described by the BBC as "one of a small group of officers 'co-governing' Venezuela with Mr Chavez". He was commander-in-chief of the Venezuelan Army from 2004 until July 2007.

=== Politics ===
In 2007, Baduel left his position as Defense Minister. Chávez later said that he had removed Baduel from office because he had been unable to explain a string of irregularities. After retiring as Defense Minister, he emerged in 2007 as an opposition leader, when he publicly broke with Chavez and announced his opposition to the constitutional changes proposed in the 2007 constitutional referendum (defeated via referendum) that would have strengthened the powers of the presidency and removed the restriction on public officials being re-elected. Baduel "emerged as a prominent voice of dissent", being concerned that Chavez was taking Venezuela down a "road to ruin" and becoming authoritarian. He became the highest-ranking military person opposed to Chavez's constitutional changes that would "concentrate power in the executive". In July 2007, he said, "A socialist regime is not incompatible with a democratic system of checks and balances and division of powers. We must separate ourselves from Marxist orthodoxy."

== Imprisonment ==
=== Arrest and initial detention ===
In October 2008, a "military prosecutor said he was responsible for about $14 million that disappeared during his tenure as defense minister" in a transaction involving the purchase of military equipment. According to The New York Times, "Chávez has moved against a wide range of domestic critics, and his efforts in recent weeks to strengthen his grip on the armed forces have led to high-profile arrests and a wave of reassignments". On 2 April 2009, Baduel was arrested at gunpoint; Baduel said that his arrest was politically motivated with Chávez allies admitting he was in private. Baduel was placed in Ramo Verde Prison. According to The Guardian, he said "his crime was to realise – and declare – that the president was a tyrant". The 2009 Human Rights Watch report mentioned Baduel as an example of political persecution. Former U.S. President Jimmy Carter expressed concern about the case, and Steve Ellner, a Venezuelan historian and analyst, noted that "courts overwhelmingly targeted opposition figures. 'Chávez's case would be much stronger if he went after corruption within his own government.' Arresting Baduel neutralised an opponent who could stir trouble in the army. 'Obviously throwing Baduel in jail had a political motivation.'" In April 2010, Amnesty International accused "the Venezuelan government of deliberately targeting opposition leaders and sympathizers".

In May 2010, Baduel was convicted by a military court of corruption and sentenced to seven years and eleven months in prison; Baduel said he was innocent. The military court declared that US$3.9 million was misappropriated, according to interviews with members of various military units; Baduel's daughter said no proof existed and the main evidence was provided by soldiers who claimed to see another officer carrying some black bags.

From Ramo Verde Prison, Baduel sent a Twitter message to family members, saying, "God is with us and divine justice is always active". He was released six years later in 2015.

=== Second detention and death ===
On 12 January 2017, Baduel was once again arrested following allegations from the Venezuelan government that he was plotting to overthrow the government. Multiple other opposition politicians were detained in what opposition politicians called trumped up charges. Family members of Baduel have denounced that he was being kept in solitary isolation at an underground facility known as The Tomb (Spanish: La Tumba) from late January 2018. In June 2019, he was moved to a maximum security prison in Fuerte Tiuna.

On 12 October 2021, the Attorney General appointed by the 2017 Constituent National Assembly, Tarek William Saab, reported Baduel's death allegedly due to cardiorespiratory arrest caused by COVID-19. His family has disputed this version as the cause of death, saying that they visited him on 9 October and that he was well, and decided not to cremate his body so as not to hinder the investigations.

== See also ==
- Political prisoners in Venezuela
- Enforced disappearances in Venezuela
