= Rohel Briceño =

Venezuelan footballer (born 1984)

Personal information
- Date of birth: 15 March 1984 (age 42)
- Place of birth: Barinas, Venezuela
- Height: 1.82 m (5 ft 11 1/2 in)
- Position: Defender

Senior career*
Years	Team	Apps	(Gls)
2005–2010	Zamora	65	(4)
2010–2013	Caracas	49	(0)
2013–2016	Aragua	94	(4)
2017	Deportivo Tachira	8	(0)
2017–2018	Trujillanos	28	(0)

International career^{‡}
2011–	Venezuela	1	(0)
- * Club domestic league appearances and goals as of 23 September 2011 ‡ National team caps and goals as of 23 September 2011

Rohel Briceño (born 15 March 1984) is a Venezuelan international footballer as a defender.

== Club career ==
Briceño has played for Zamora FC and Caracas FC.

== International career ==
He made his international debut for Venezuela in 2011.
