= Jody Stewart =

Costa Rican footballer (born 1986)

Jody Stewar
Personal information
- Full name: Jody Stewart Jones
- Date of birth: 17 February 1986 (age 40)
- Place of birth: San José, Costa Rica
- Height: 1.86 m (6 ft 1 in)
- Position: Defender

Youth career
- Saprissa

Senior career*
| Years | Team | Apps | (Gls) |
| 2005–2007 | Saprissa | 11 | (0) |
| 2007–2009 | Saprissa de Corazón | | |
| 2010 | Sagrada Familia | | |
- * Club domestic league appearances and goals as of March 23, 2008

Jody Stewart Jones (born 17 February 1986) is a Costa Rican footballer.

== Club career ==
Stewart came through the youth ranks at Saprissa and made his senior debut for them in October 2005. He later played for Sagrada Familia.
