= Gustavo Rangel Briceño =

Venezuelan politician

Minister of Defense
- In office January 2008 – March 2009
- President: Hugo Chavez
- Preceded by: Raúl Baduel
- Succeeded by: Ramón Carrizalez

Personal details
- Born: 16 August 1956 (age 69) Maracaibo, Zulia, Venezuela
- Party: United Socialist Party of Venezuela

Gustavo Rangel Briceño (born 1956 in Maracaibo) is a Venezuelan military officer. He was Minister of Defense from January 2008 to March 2009.

== Biography ==
He was born in the city of Maracaibo on 16 August 1956. He graduated from the Venezuelan Academy of Military Sciences in 1978, and has a degree on mechanical engineering, in which he achieved the cum laude distinction.
