= Jesús Aguilarte =

Venezuela politician (c.1959–2012)

Governor of Apure (1st term)
- In office 1999–2000
- Preceded by: José Gregorio Montilla
- Succeeded by: Luis Lippa

Governor of Apure (2nd term)
- In office 2004–2011
- Preceded by: Luis Lippa
- Succeeded by: Ramón Carrizales

Personal details
- Born: c. 1959
- Died: 2 April 2012 (aged 53) Maracay, Venezuela
- Party: MVR, PSUV
- Profession: former army captain, politician

Jesús Aguilarte (c. 1959 – 2 April 2012) was the Governor of Apure State in Venezuela from 1999 to 2000, and from 2004 to 2011. He died in a Maracay hospital on April 2, 2012, after being attacked by a gunman on March 24, 2012. He was 53.
