= Ramón Carrizales =

Venezuelan politician (born 1952)

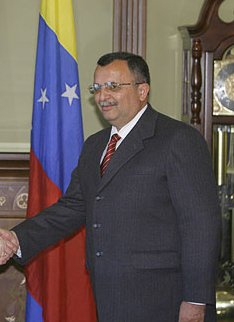

Governor of Apure
- In office 10 February 2011 – 21 November 2021
- Preceded by: Jesús Aguilarte

Minister of Infrastructure
- In office 2004 – 2 July 2006
- President: Hugo Chavez
- Preceded by: Diosdado Cabello
- Succeeded by: José David Cabello

Vice President of Venezuela
- In office 3 January 2008 – 25 January 2010
- President: Hugo Chavez
- Preceded by: Jorge Rodríguez
- Succeeded by: Elías Jaua

Minister of Defense
- In office 4 March 2009 – 25 January 2010
- President: Hugo Chavez
- Preceded by: Gustavo Rangel Briceño
- Succeeded by: Carlos Mata Figueroa

Personal details
- Born: 8 November 1952 (age 73) Zaraza, Guarico, Venezuela
- Party: United Socialist Party of Venezuela (PSUV)

Ramón Alonso Carrizales Rengifo (born 8 November 1952) is a Venezuelan politician who was the vice president of Venezuela from January 2008 to January 2010. Carrizales was a Colonel of the Venezuelan Armed Forces (retired in 1994) and was educated at the Venezuelan Academy of Military Sciences, where he graduated in 1974.

He was appointed vice president by President Hugo Chávez in January 2008 after previously serving as chair of the Fondo Nacional de Transporte Urbano (Fontur) from 2000 to 2004, Infrastructure Minister 2004 to 2006, and Housing Minister from 2007 to 2008. In 2009, Chavez appointed Carrizales to also serve as the Minister of Defense.

On 25 January 2010, Carrizales resigned as both Defense Minister and Vice President for personal reasons.

== Sanctions ==
On 25 February 2019, the Office of Foreign Assets Control (OFAC) of the United States Department of the Treasury placed sanctions in effect against Carrizales and governors of 3 other Venezuelan states for alleged involvement in corruption and in blocking the delivery of humanitarian aid.

Carrizales was sanctioned by the Canadian government on 15 April 2019 under the Special Economic Measures Act. The government statement said "the sanctions hit high ranking officials of the Maduro regime, regional governors, and people directly implicated in activities undermining democratic institutions." Foreign Minister Chrystia Freeland stated, "The Maduro dictatorship must be held accountable for this crisis and depriving Venezuelans of their most basic rights and needs. Canada is committed to supporting the peaceful restoration of constitutional democracy in Venezuela."

Political offices
Preceded by Jorge Rodríguez	Vice President of Venezuela; 2008–2010	Succeeded by Elías Jaua
