= Jorge Valero =

Venezuelan politician

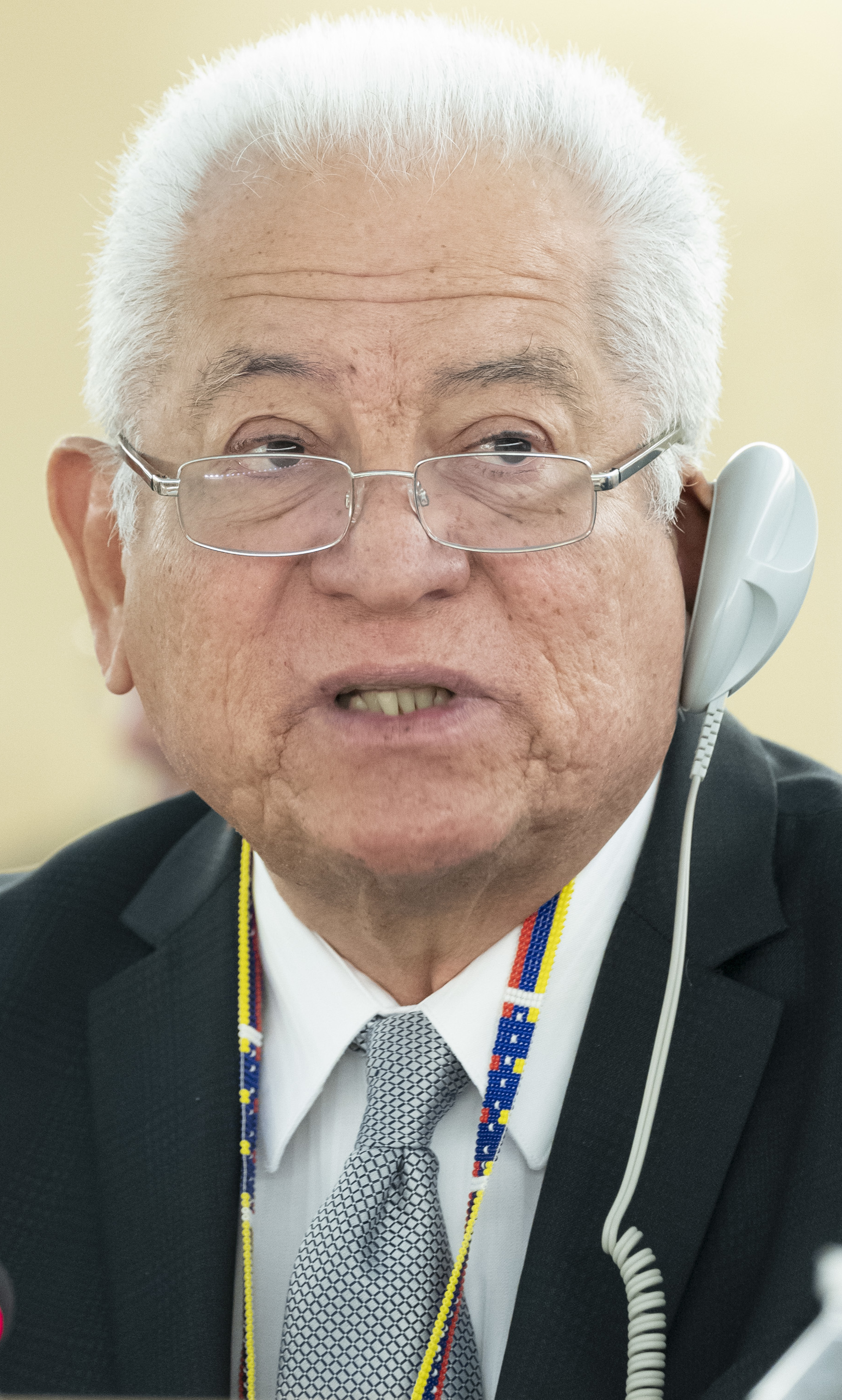
- Jorge Valero in 2018.

Personal details
- Born: Jorge Valero Briceño; 8 November 1946 (age 78); Valera, Trujillo, Venezuela

Jorge Valero Briceño (born 8 November 1946 in Valera, Trujillo) is a Venezuelan diplomat. He was a Permanent Representative of Venezuela to the United Nations.

== Early career ==
A graduate of the University of the Andes with a degree in history, Valero received his master's degree in Latin American studies from the University of London. He has also taught in undergraduate and postgraduate studies at the University of the Andes and the Central University of Venezuela. He was the President of the Latin American Parliament's Social Debt Commission (Comisión de la Deuda Social del Parlamento Latinoamericano). As a longtime politician, Valero has authored numerous opinion pieces, but as an academic, has also written several academic papers and books on history.

== Political and diplomatic offices ==
Valero has previously served as a Deputy in the Venezuelan Chamber of Deputies. A backer of the Rafael Caldera and Hugo Chávez governments, Valero went on to serve several posts in the current government. He also appointed Ambassador to the Republic of Korea during the Fourth Republic. In 1999, Valero was Venezuela's Representative on the Governing Board of the OPEC Fund for International Development (OFID), and in 2000 he was the President of the Presidential Preparatory Commission for the OPEC Summit hosted in Caracas that year. Valero currently serves as Deputy Foreign Minister for North America and Multilateral Affairs and also as the Permanent Representative for Venezuela to the Permanent Council of the Organization of American States (OAS).

As a spokesmen for the Chávez government, Valero made headlines for antagonistic comments about the United States, for example by referring to the United States as an "empire," and accusing the United States of human rights abuses and genocide for its embargo of Cuba. During the 2008 Andean diplomatic crisis, he accused the government of Colombia of state terrorism and genocide for its long armed conflict with the FARC rebels.

Valero was a Permanent Representative of Venezuela to the United Nations.
