= Daniel Briceño (politician) =

Colombian politician

Member of the Chamber of Representatives
- Incumbent
- Assumed office 20 July 2026
- Constituency: Bogotá

Personal details
- Born: 1993 or 1994 (age 32–33)
- Party: Democratic Centre

Daniel Felipe Briceño Montes is a Colombian politician who was elected member of the Chamber of Representatives in 2026. From 2024 to 2026, he was a member of the Bogotá City Council.
