= Yon Goicoechea =

Venezuelan politician

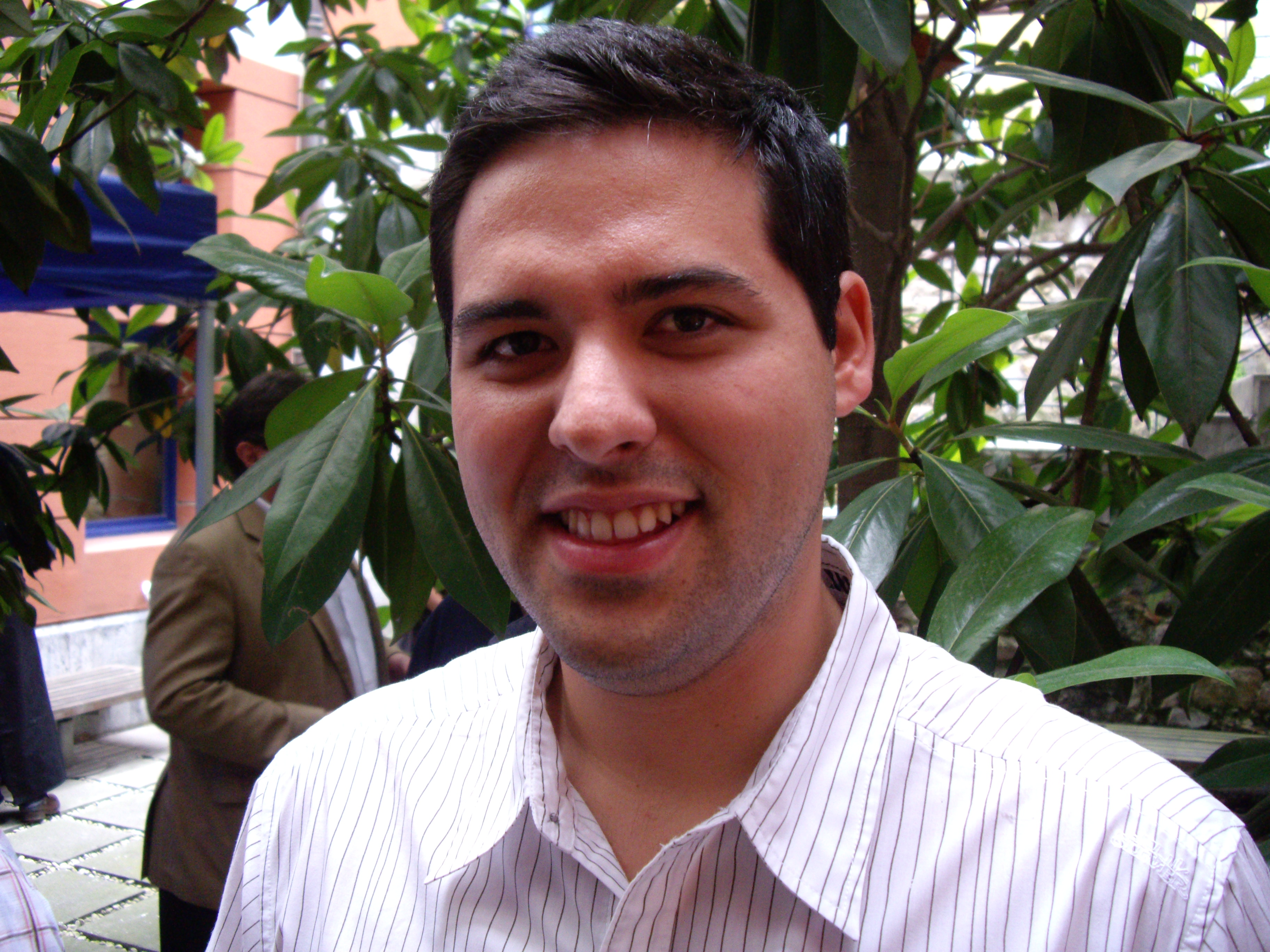
- Born: November 8, 1984 (age 41); Caracas, Venezuela
- Education: Columbia Law School; Andrés Bello Catholic University
- Occupations: Lawyer; Activist; Organizer
- Awards: Sakharov Prize (2017)

Yon Alexander Goicoechea Lara (born 8 November 1984) is a Venezuelan lawyer, activist and organizer. He emerged as one of the leaders behind the Venezuelan Student Movement, which formed as a result of actions by Hugo Chávez to amass further power as the country's president. He holds degrees from the Andrés Bello Catholic University and Columbia University.

== Career ==
In 2008, the Cato Institute awarded Goicoechea the Milton Friedman Prize for Advancing Liberty which comes with an award of $500,000. At the time, Peruvian novelist Mario Vargas Llosa called Goicoechea, "a symbol of… democratic reaction when freedom is threatened." After receiving the Prize, Goicoechea experienced harassment in Venezuela, and state-run television depicted him as a cartoon clutching wards of cash stamped with the words "Made in USA." As a result of his activism, he experienced death threats, which led him to move between various friends' homes to stay safe. President Chávez called the Goicoechea-led student movement, a "fascist attack." In 2013, Goicochea decided to leave Venezuela with his family.

After a period abroad, working and studying in the USA and Spain, Goicoechea returned to Venezuela in 2016 to rejoin the political arena. In an interview on June 26, Goicoechea explained that his return was marked by a renewed enthusiasm for the future of Venezuela. After leaving the Primero Justicia political party, Goicoechea joined another opposition organization, Popular Will, and campaigned for the recall referendum against president Nicolás Maduro.

== Detention ==
On August 29, 2016 Goicoechea was detained while driving in La Trinidad, a neighborhood of Caracas. Witnesses indicated that the Bolivarian Intelligence Service (SEBIN) was responsible for his detention, but PSUV vice president and National Assembly deputy Diosdado Cabello later acknowledged his detention during a government rally. Cabello stated that Goicoechea had been arrested with "explosives and detonators". For two days no news were heard of his whereabouts raising concerns of his spouse, fellow party members and Human Rights Foundation. On August 31, 2016 and after his lawyer, Nizar El Fakih, filed a lawsuit for unlawful detention and imprisonment, Goicoechea was taken to an arraignment court in Caracas. On arraignment, his lawyer stated his detention was not only irregularly executed, but that the charges being raised against Goicoechea had no basis of evidence. During the preliminary hearing on Friday September 2, 2016, an arraignment judge ordered that Goicoechea should remain under police custody without bail. After hearing the charges and pleading not guilty, Goicoechea expressed his commitment to both democracy and a non-violent struggle for a better future in Venezuela. He was paroled in October, and later wrote about his experiences in an editorial for The New York Times.

== See also ==
- Political prisoners in Venezuela
