= Daniel Briceño (Chilean footballer) =

Chilean footballer (born 1982)

Personal information
- Full name: Daniel Antonio Briceño Jalabert
- Date of birth: 2 March 1982 (age 44)
- Place of birth: Curicó, Chile
- Height: 1.67 m (5 ft 6 in)
- Position: Midfielder

Senior career*
Years	Team	Apps	(Gls)
2007–2009	Curicó Unido	58	(2)
2009–2010	Unión San Felipe	20	(0)
2010	Unión La Calera	17	(0)
2011–2015	San Marcos de Arica	105	(0)
2015–2016	Ñublense	16	(0)
2016–2017	Lota Schwager	27	(1)
Total		243	(3)
- * Club domestic league appearances and goals

Daniel Antonio Briceño Jalabert (born 2 March 1982) is a Chilean former professional footballer who played as a midfielder

== Honours ==
=== Player ===
Curicó Unido

- Tercera División de Chile: 2005

Unión San Felipe

- Primera B: 2009
- Copa Chile: 2009
