= Daniel Briceño (Colombian footballer) =

Colombian footballer (born 1985)

Personal information
- Full name: Daniel Oswaldo Briceño Bueno
- Date of birth: September 16, 1985 (age 41)
- Place of birth: Cucuta, Colombia
- Height: 1.81 m (5 ft 11 in)
- Positions: Central defender; striker

Senior career*
| Years | Team | Apps | (Gls) |
| 2005-2006 | Deportes Tolima | | |
| 2007 | Deportivo Cali | | |
| 2008 | Deportes Tolima | | |
| 2008-2010 | Deportivo Cali | | |
| 2011 | Monagas | | |
| 2012-2015 | La Equidad | | |
| 2015-2016 | Deportivo Pasto | | |
| 2017 | Deportivo Lara | | |
| 2017-18 | Alianza Petrolera | | |
| 2019 | Patriotas Boyacá | | |

International career
| 2005-2006 | Colombia U-20 | | |
- * Club domestic league appearances and goals

Daniel Oswaldo Briceño Bueno (born September 16, 1985) is a Colombian retired footballer who played as a defender, primarily in the centre-back position.

Briceño began his professional career in 2005 with Deportes Tolima. In 2006 he was part of the squad that finished league runner-up. Later that year he won the first title of his career, the Central American and Caribbean Games with the Colombia u-20 team. He scored the winning goal in the final against Venezuela.

In 2008 he joined Deportivo Cali and won the 2010 Copa Colombia.

In 2011 he had his first taste or foreign football, signing with Venezuela's Monagas

From 2012 to 2015 he played for La Equidad as a central defender and as a striker.

Briceño concluded his professional football career with Patriotas Boyacá after the 2019 season.

== Honors ==
Deportivo Cali

- Copa Colombia: 2010

Colombia U20

- Central American and Caribbean Games: 2006
