= Eduardo López Bustamante =

Venezuelan journalist, lawyer and poet

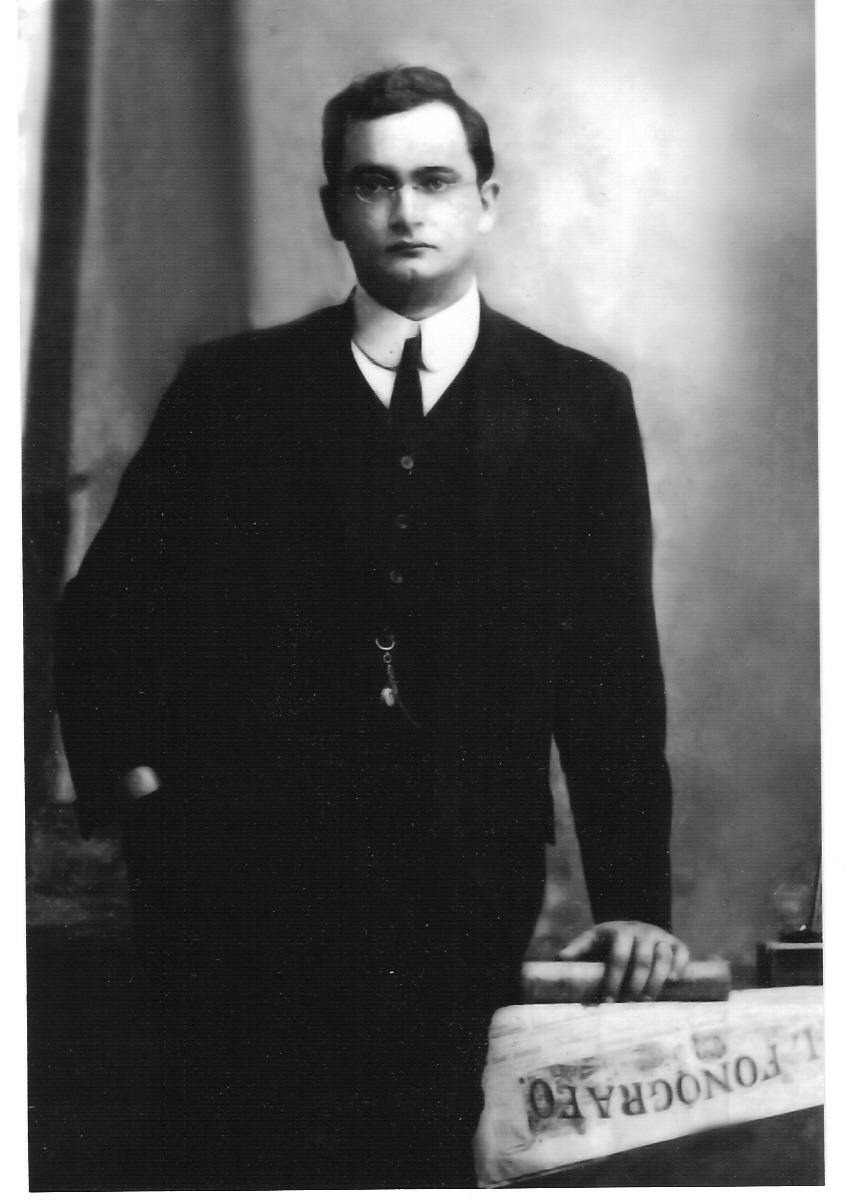
- Born: 9 December 1881 Maracaibo, Venezuela
- Died: 30 June 1939 (aged 57) Maracaibo, Venezuela
- Occupation: Journalist, editor, lawyer
- Spouse: Aurora Pérez Luzardo

Eduardo López Bustamante (9 December 1881 – 30 June 1939) was a Venezuelan journalist, lawyer and poet. He was a leading intellectual of the Zulia State, Venezuela, and a figure within Venezuelan jurisprudence.

== Biography ==
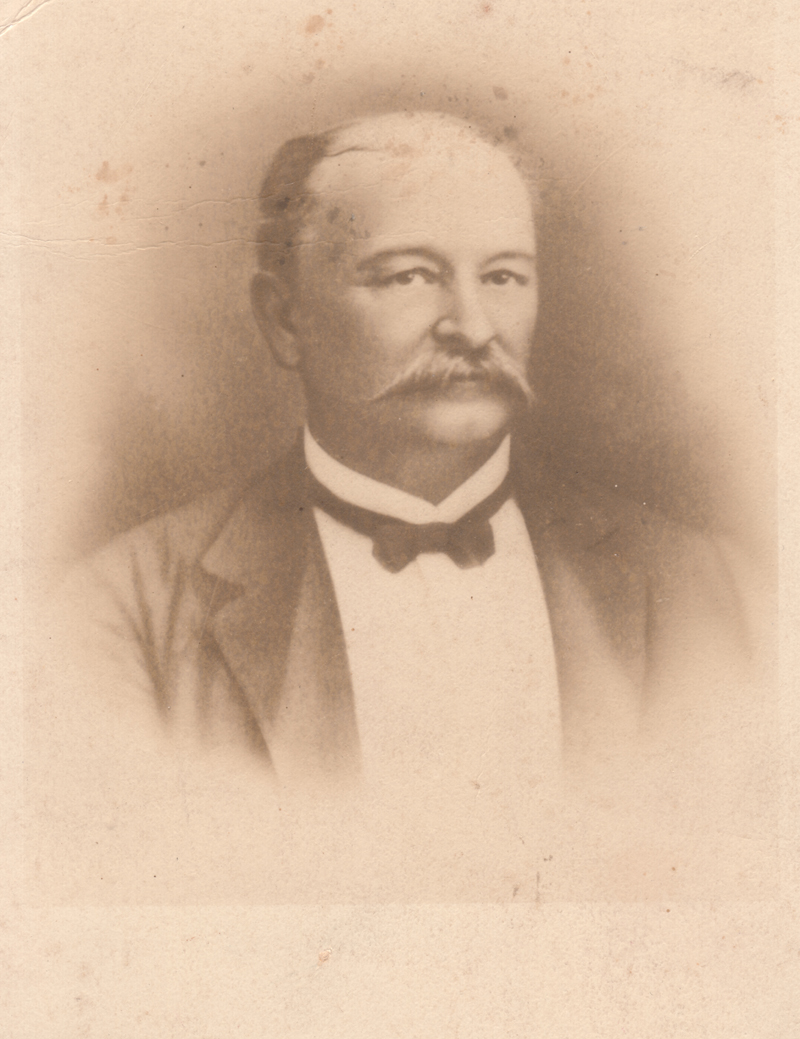
Editor Eduardo López Rivas, López Bustamante's father

Eduardo López Bustamante was born in Maracaibo, Venezuela, on 9 December 1881. He was the eldest son of Eduardo López Rivas and Carmen Bustamante. His father was a journalist, publisher and editor of the newspaper Diario El Fonógrafo (The Phonograph Daily) and the magazine El Zulia ilustrado (The illustrated Zulia). He was also the owner of a Venezuelan publishing house, Imprenta Americana (American Press). His mother was the niece of pioneer Venezuelan physician Francisco Eugenio Bustamante and a descendant of General Rafael Urdaneta.

He grew up into the intellectual environment created by his father and during his childhood he learned several languages. This knowledge enabled him to become, at eighteen, the translator of international news in El Fonógrafo, which, by that time, reached newspapers in the original language of each country.

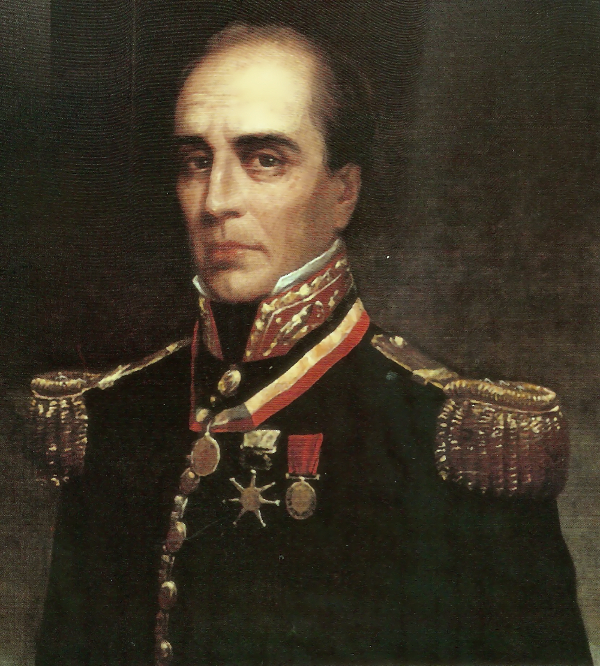
General Rafael Urdaneta, ancestor of Eduardo López Bustamante

He gradually became involved in journalism and in the family business. He and his brothers, Carlos and Enrique, as well as his sister Teresa López Bustamante, were educated as journalists under their father's principles. According to historian Alfredo Tarre Murzi, they became a true dynasty of writers.

He married Aurora Pérez Luzardo in 1910, daughter of General Eduardo Pérez Fabelo, a military linked to the history of Zulia state. The couple had six children. Aurora was also sister to Venezuelan lawyer Néstor Luis Pérez Luzardo, a minister in the Eleazar López Contreras cabinet.

He died in Maracaibo on 30 June 1939.

== Director of El Fonógrafo ==
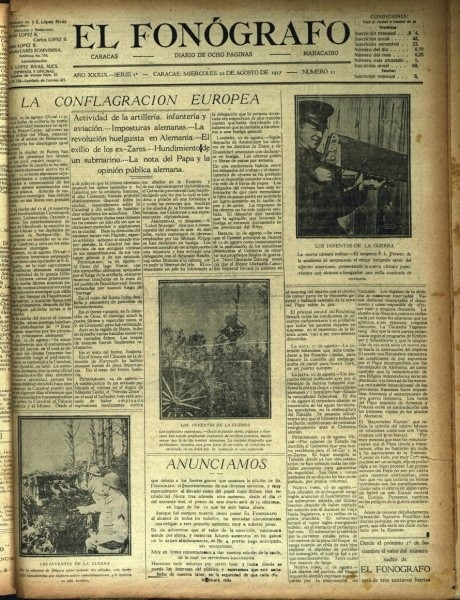
Front page of Diario El Fonógrafo during World War I

In 1908 Eduardo López Bustamante was appointed director of the newspaper El Fonógrafo and of the publishing house, Imprenta Americana. That same year general Juan Vicente Gómez became president of Venezuela and imposed strong censorship. According to author José Rafael Pocaterra, due to its independent editorials, El Fonógrafo was constantly threatened by the government. In his book Memorias de un venezolano de la decandencia (Memoirs of a Venezuelan in decline), he refers to the Gómez regime as a "Tyranny far more brutal than all previous ones". "The previous despotic regimes", writes Pocaterra, "had respected that newspaper, whose material progress was a result of its enormous moral responsibility".

=== World War I ===
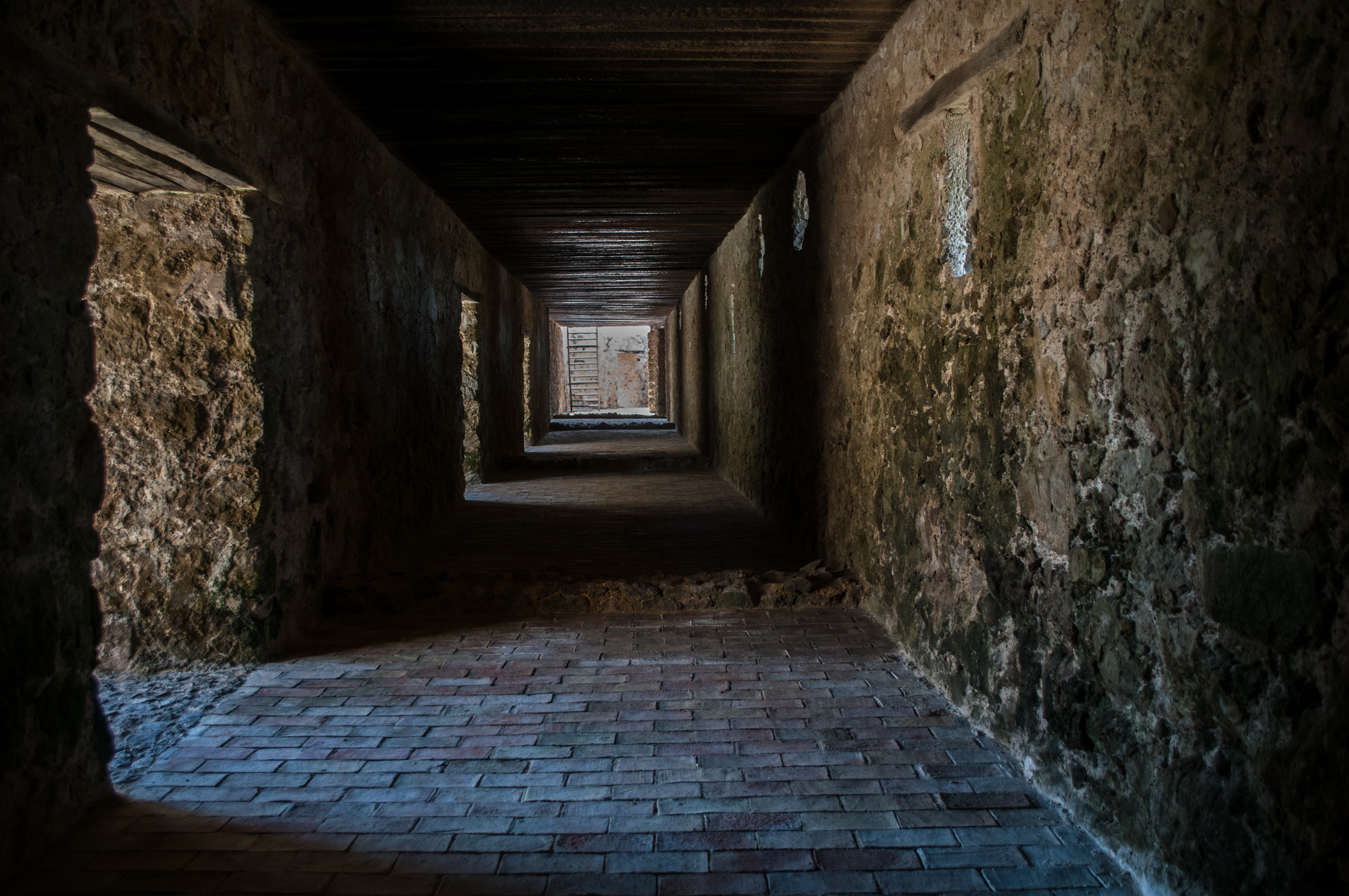
Dungeons at San Carlos Fort, where López Bustamante was held as political prisoner during five years

When World War I began in 1914, Gómez favored the German Empire in the conflict while maintaining a veneer of neutrality against the allied community. In 1917, Eduardo started a simultaneous edition of "El Fonógrafo" in Caracas, under the direction of his younger brother, Carlos López Bustamante. According to the writer and columnist of "El Fonógrafo", José Rafael Pocaterra, the Capital's edition "enjoyed a great popularity from the beginning" because, unlike other Venezuelan newspapers of the time, El Fonógrafo sympathized with the Allies. This position annoyed Gómez who, thereafter, decided to put an end to the newspaper. In the words of writer Pocaterra, "anonymous and insulting threats rained down" during those days.

The newspapers's policy in favor of the Allies resulted in economic imbalance for "El Fonógrafo" because most of its advertisements, that came from Maracaibo German import and trading firms, began to be withdrawn. Government pressure on the newspaper became more and more intense but Eduardo López Bustamante did not change El Fonógrafo's editorial line.

On 23 August 1917, the newspaper was raided by government troops. The headquarters of "El Fonógrafo" in Caracas and Maracaibo were closed permanently, ending with it, writes José R. Pocaterra, "the efforts of two generations ... and 38 years of the great Zulia newspaper." López Bustamante escaped to Curaçao where he lived as an expatriate for two years.

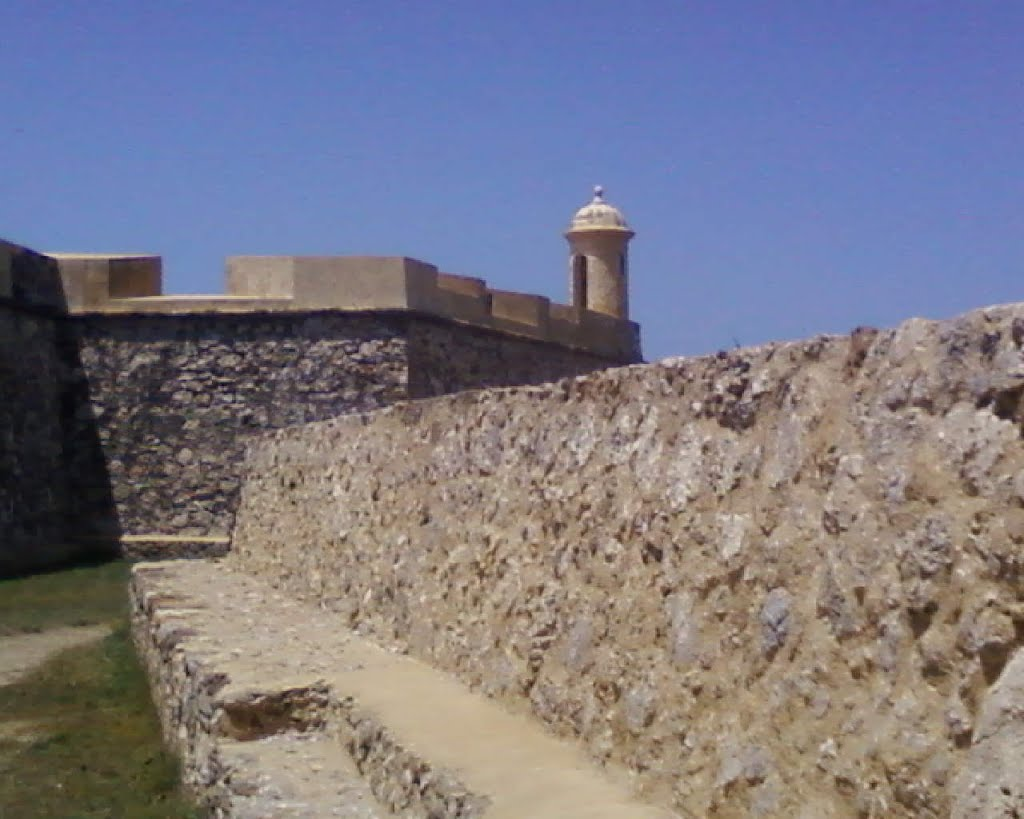
San Carlos fort

== Prison ==
Eduardo López Bustamante returned to Venezuela in 1919, under a false promise of armistice, and was imprisoned for five years in a colonial fortress located at the entrance to the Gulf of Venezuela: the San Carlos de la Barra Castle. Many of his better poems were written during his captivity.

López Bustamante spent five years in the castle on the island of San Carlos del Zulia, shackled and bolted by the feet and living in subhuman conditions. During his captivity he devoted himself to studying law, with a view to taking steps to rejoin the Venezuelan society still governed by Gómez. The permanent closure of the family publishing house and newspaper made it clear to the journalist that he needed to have another profession.

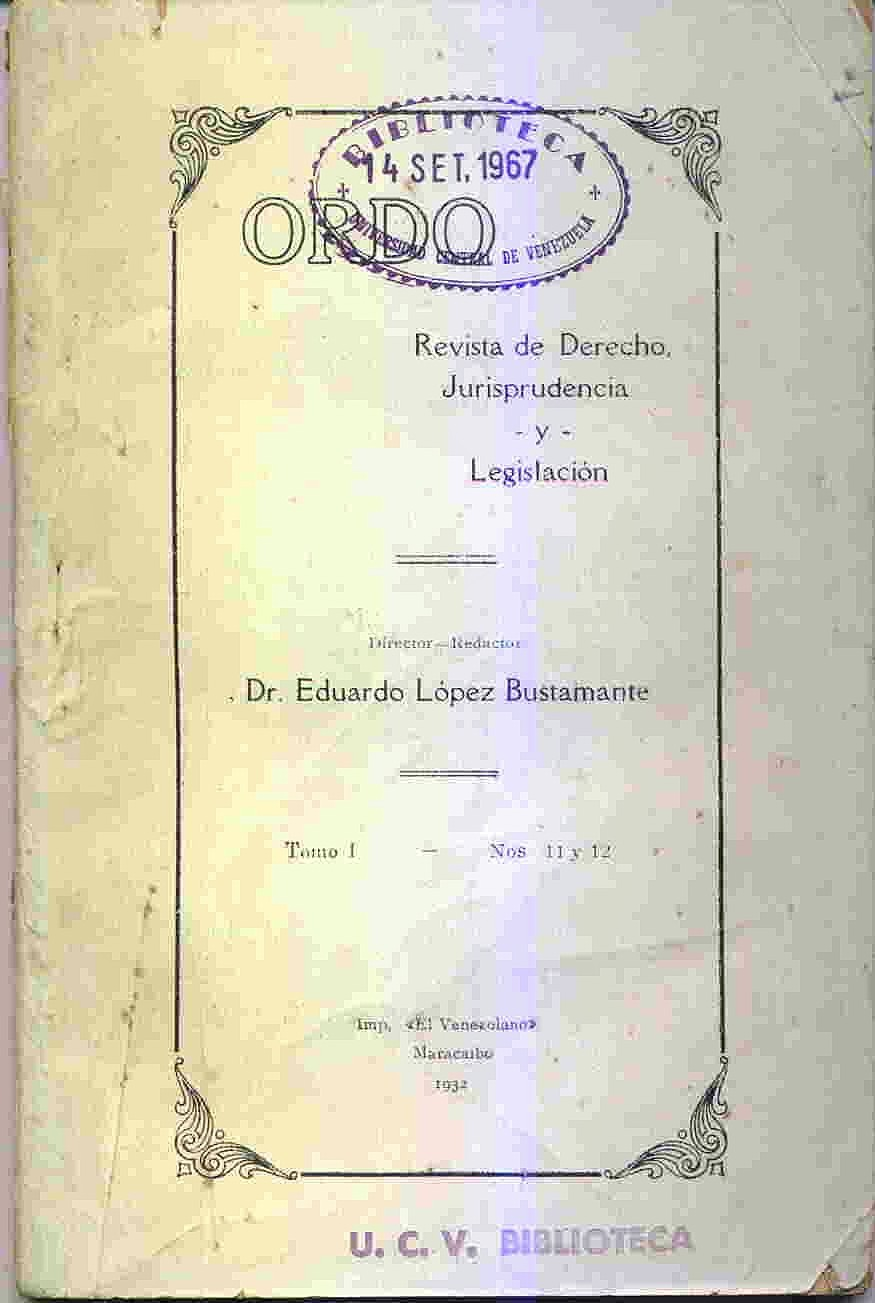
Cover of "ORDO", a magazine of law, jurisprudence and legislation, edited by Eduardo López Bustamante

== Legal career ==
Eduardo López Bustamante earned his political science degree at the University of Los Andes, on 14 October 1924. Author Gastón Montiel Villasmil writes that, "from then on he developed a true passion for the essential foundation of law."

López Bustamante was a popular lawyer within Zulia state, particularly among workers of the oil sector. Venezuelan writer Ciro Nava explains in his book Centuria cultural del Zulia: "When the oil industry started in Venezuela, as a result of oil exploitation, Eduardo López Bustamante sided with them and became a leading advocate of the workers' rights". "In this respect", writes Nava, "the performance of Eduardo López Bustamante is always deeply remembered and appreciated by the people of Zulia." Venezuelan writer Gastón Montiel Villasmil adds that López Bustamante "wrote several works of interesting legal content related to the subject, being best known the one entitled Responsibility for accidents occurring at work.

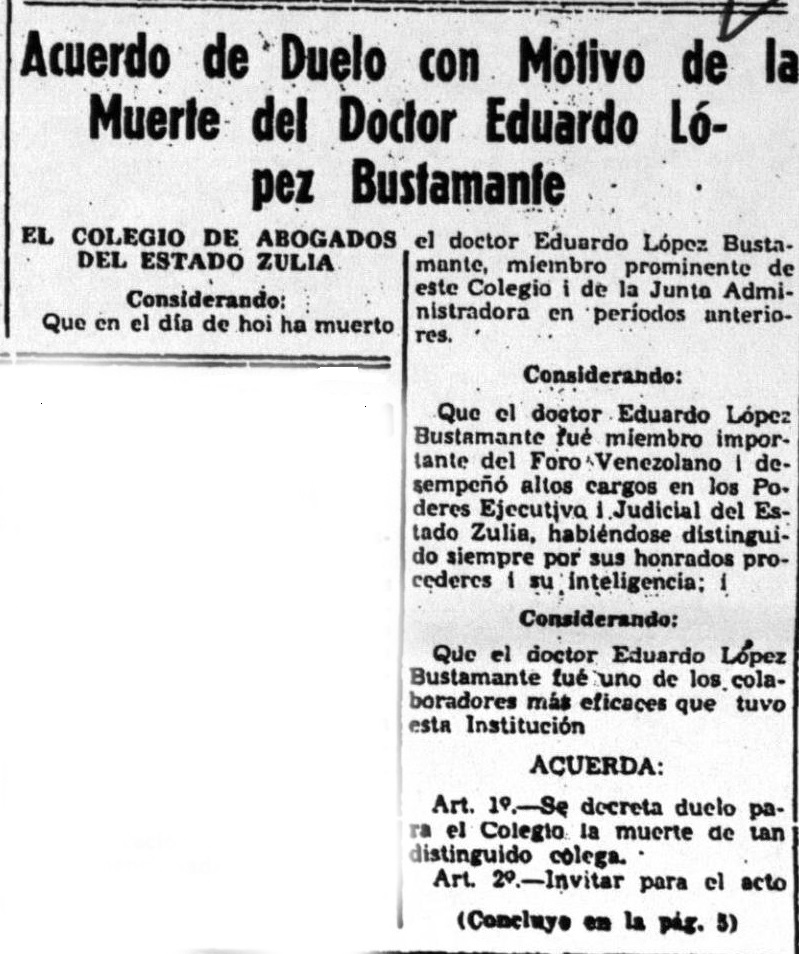
Statement and giref agreement of the Zulia State Bar Association, upon the death of López Bustamante

López Bustamante conducted an investigation of eleven chapters about the lease of works under Venezuelan law, which is still often reviewed by Venezuelan publications dealing with jurisprudence. The 1963 edition of Zulia State University Journal of Law refers to this work: "This superb work on law entitled The lease of works, product of the fertile estrous that was Eduardo López Bustamante throughout his life...outstanding intellectual figure..."

=== Editor ===
During the years he practiced law López Bustamante once more became an editor. He created ORDO, a monthly magazine of Law, Jurisprudence and Legislation, that reviewed a variety of legal issues. A collection of all issues of the magazine has been preserved by the National Library of Venezuela, located in the city of Caracas.

=== Positions ===
Eduardo López Bustamante was a professor at the Maracaibo School of Law, lieutenant governor of the Zulia State and Minister for the Zulia State Supreme Court. He was the legal adviser of the Ministry of Development during López Contreras presidency and of the City Council of Maracaibo. He was a Spanish legal interpreter in French, English and Italian.

The remains of Eduardo López Bustamante rest next to those of his wife, in the pantheon of the Pérez Luzardo family of Cemetery The Square Luxburg-Carolath in the city of Maracaibo.

== See also ==
- Political prisoners in Venezuela
