= Teresa López Bustamante =

Venezuelan journalist

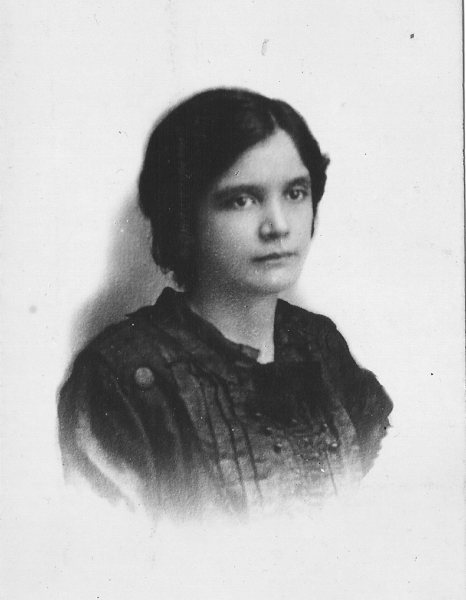
Teresa López Bustamante in 1912.

Teresa López Bustamante (1888 – 1942) was a Venezuelan journalist, founder of the Catholic Venezuelan newspaper La Columna (The Column).

== Biography ==
Teresa López Bustamante was born in Maracaibo, Venezuela, on October 24, 1888. Her father was journalist and editor Eduardo López Rivas, owner of the Venezuelan newspaper Diario El Fonógrafo (The Phonograph Daily) and the publishing house Imprenta Americana (American Press). Her mother was the niece of Venezuelan pioneer physician Francisco Eugenio Bustamante and a descendant of General Rafael Urdaneta.

She started to work at the family publishing house in her teen years and, together with her brothers Carlos López Bustamante and Eduardo López Bustamante, she was educated by her father and became an accomplished journalist. When her father died in 1913 she and her brothers took charge of the newspaper El Fonógrafo and of the publishing house Imprenta Americana.

Due to its support of the Allies during World War I, in 1917 Venezuelan president Juan Vicente Gómez permanently closed down the newspaper El Fonógrafo and consequently the editorial house. Her brothers were imprisoned and the government began to watch and isolate Teresa. She was forbidden to leave the city of Maracaibo and to write in any other newspaper.

She started to work as a school teacher in Maracaibo and founded several charity organizations in the Venezuelan Zulia state. In 1924 she founded the newspaper of the Roman Catholic Archdiocese of Maracaibo, El bien del pueblo (The good of the people). It soon became a daily newspaper, La Columna (The Column), and one of the most important newspapers of the Zulia state.

She died in Maracaibo in 1942.
