= Muhammad Akhtar =

Muhammad Akhtar may refer to:

- Mohammad Akhtar (1921-1983), Pakistani Air Vice Marshal
- Muhammad Akhtar (biochemist) (born 1933), British-Pakistani biochemist
- Muhammad Akhtar (wrestler) (born 1930), Pakistani wrestler
- Muhammad Khalil Akhtar (born 1984), Pakistani sports shooter
- Mohammad Akhtar, Essex Cricket Board List A cricketer
