= Carlos López Bustamante =

Venezuelan journalist

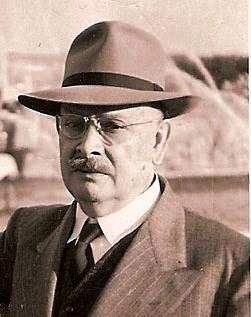
- Born: Carlos López Bustamante; 1890; Maracaibo, Venezuela
- Died: 1950 (aged 59–60); Chicago, U.S.A
- Occupations: Journalist, magazine publisher
- Spouse: María Emilia Lares Echeverría
- Parent(s): Eduardo López Rivas; Carmen Bustamante Urdaneta
- Relatives: See Eduardo López Rivas Eduardo López Bustamante

Carlos Arturo López Bustamante (1890–1950) was a Venezuelan journalist. He was born in Maracaibo, Venezuela in 1890 and died in Chicago, USA in 1950. He was known for his fierce opposition to the dictator Juan Vicente Gómez from the pages of Diario El Fonógrafo newspaper. López Bustamante was the son of journalist Eduardo López Rivas, editor and owner of the Maracaibo newspaper, Diario El Fonógrafo, the magazine El Zulia ilustrado and the publishing house Imprenta Americana. His mother was Doña Carmen Bustamante López, niece of Venezuelan physician Francisco Eugenio Bustamante and a descendant of General Rafael Urdaneta. Doña Carmen died when Carlos was only a child.

== Biography ==
López Bustamante's adolescence and youth were spent in the shadow of his father, a Venezuelan intellectual, who was in charge of embedding in his children a love for culture, knowledge and freedom. From his early youth López Bustamante began working in the family business, Imprenta Americana (The American Press), owned by Eduardo López Rivas. There he received training and professional ethics, actively participating in the civilizing crusade which was led by his father in the young Venezuelan republic.

López Bustamante married Maria Emilia Lares Echeverria in Maracaibo. She was a young descendant of Rafael Maria Baralt. Maria Emilia was the daughter of one of López Bustamante father's best friends, the Zulian photographer Arturo Lares Baralt. Maria Emilia Lares Echeverria and Carlos López Bustamante had twelve children. López Bustamante died in 1950 at the age of sixty, in the city of Chicago, USA. His remains were later transferred to the city of New York, his final resting place.

His descendants include American political activist Kamala Lopez, artist/activist Jeanmarie Simpson and Venezuelan energy expert Luis Giusti López.

== Publishing career ==
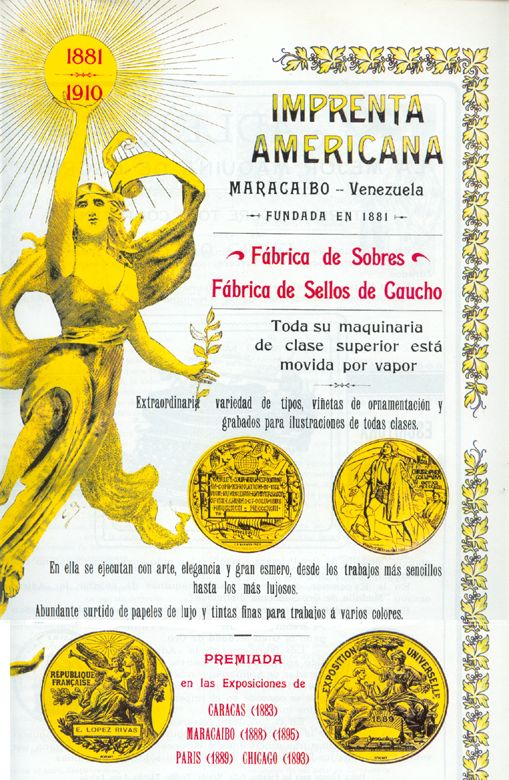
Advertising of Imprenta Americana, owned by the López family

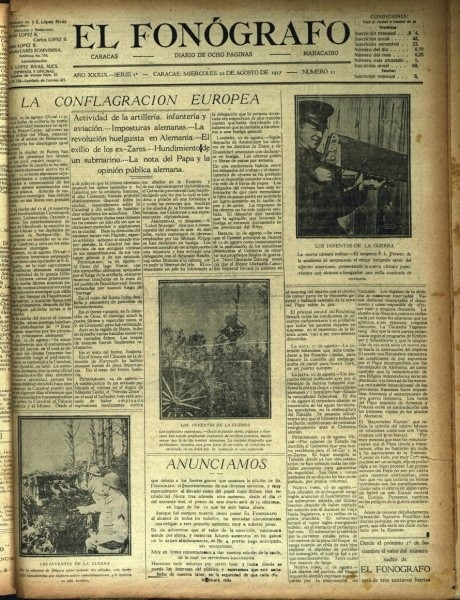
Edition of "El Fonógrafo" in August 1917

The López publications were published in Maracaibo's Imprenta Americana, one of the most modern typographic workshops on the continent at the time. In printing workshops López Bustamante learned printing and binding techniques and everything related to the handling of activities that were done in the famous publishing house. This occurred while he was studying in high school, accompanied by the learning of various languages, instructed by private tutors who came to the residence of Don Eduardo López Rivas for tutoring for his children.

He gradually became involved in the work of the newspaper, in national and international information, in the management of cables and telegraphs and in everything related to the development of a contemporary newspaper. At the age of twenty, Carlos López Bustamante was a trained journalist and mastered the most modern printing techniques of the time. The publishing house of López Rivas was one of the most advanced in the Americas and had won many national and international awards.

The turning point in his career occurred after the death of his father. His older brother Eduardo López Bustamante, director of El Fonógrafo, decided to open a simultaneous edition of the newspaper in Caracas. Carlos then moved to the capital city with his family to take charge of the Caracas issue. This event opened a bright stage in the career of the young journalist and wrote the final pages of the story of El Fonógrafo, which had circulated for nearly four decades.

At 27 years old, and in just a few months, Carlos López Bustamante became one of the most popular journalists in the capital. The newspaper El Fonógrafo was the most requested by audiences in Caracas since, among other things, it was a bastion of freedom, a Venezuelan news media not bent towards Juan Vicente Gómez dictatorship like many others.

== Imprisonment ==
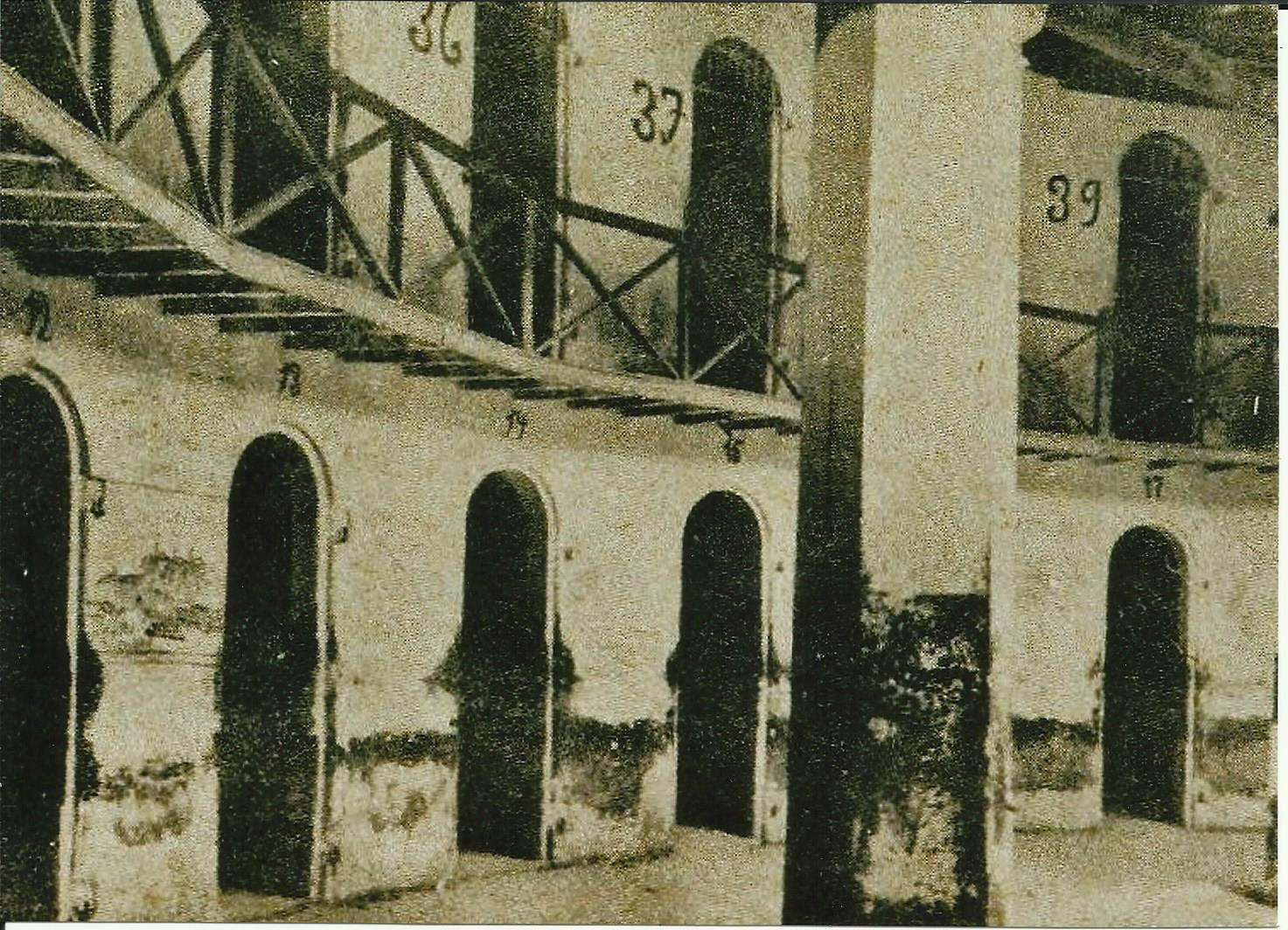
"La Rotunda", a prison in Caracas where Carlos López Bustamante spent nine months

The First World War convulsed Europe and this, in one way or another, involved all nations. Traditional Germanic culture admirer, Juan Vicente Gómez favored the German Empire in the conflict. Unlike other Venezuelan media of that time, the editorial of "El Fonógrafo" sympathized with the nations in war which became known as the "Allied" countries. This position annoyed Gómez who took up the challenge of putting an end forever to the newspaper.

The López Bustamante brothers kept the principles instilled by their father and continued with their editorial line at all costs. This resulted in an economic imbalance in the newspaper, the majority of whose advertisements came from German import and trading firms based in the city of Maracaibo. Government harassment was becoming more intense and threats to the López Bustamante brothers intensified day by day.

Despite this, the newspaper continued its editorial line. On August 23, 1917, the newspaper was raided by government police. The offices of "El Fonógrafo" in Caracas and Maracaibo were closed and Carlos was taken to a prison in the capital, La Rotunda. He spent nine months in chains, with shackles and bolts on his feet, and living in subhuman conditions. He survived several attempts of poisoning by prison guards and finally managed to escape into exile in the United States.

In his remarks to The New York Times on June 17, 1918, Carlos López Bustamante related that he was arrested by Venezuelan soldiers because of his editorials in support of allies in the global conflict, that days before their offices were raided, Gómez's secret police had pressured them with threats to sell the paper to the government for one hundred thousand U.S. dollars, a proposition which the López Bustamante brothers had flatly rejected.

== Venezuela Futura and América Futura ==
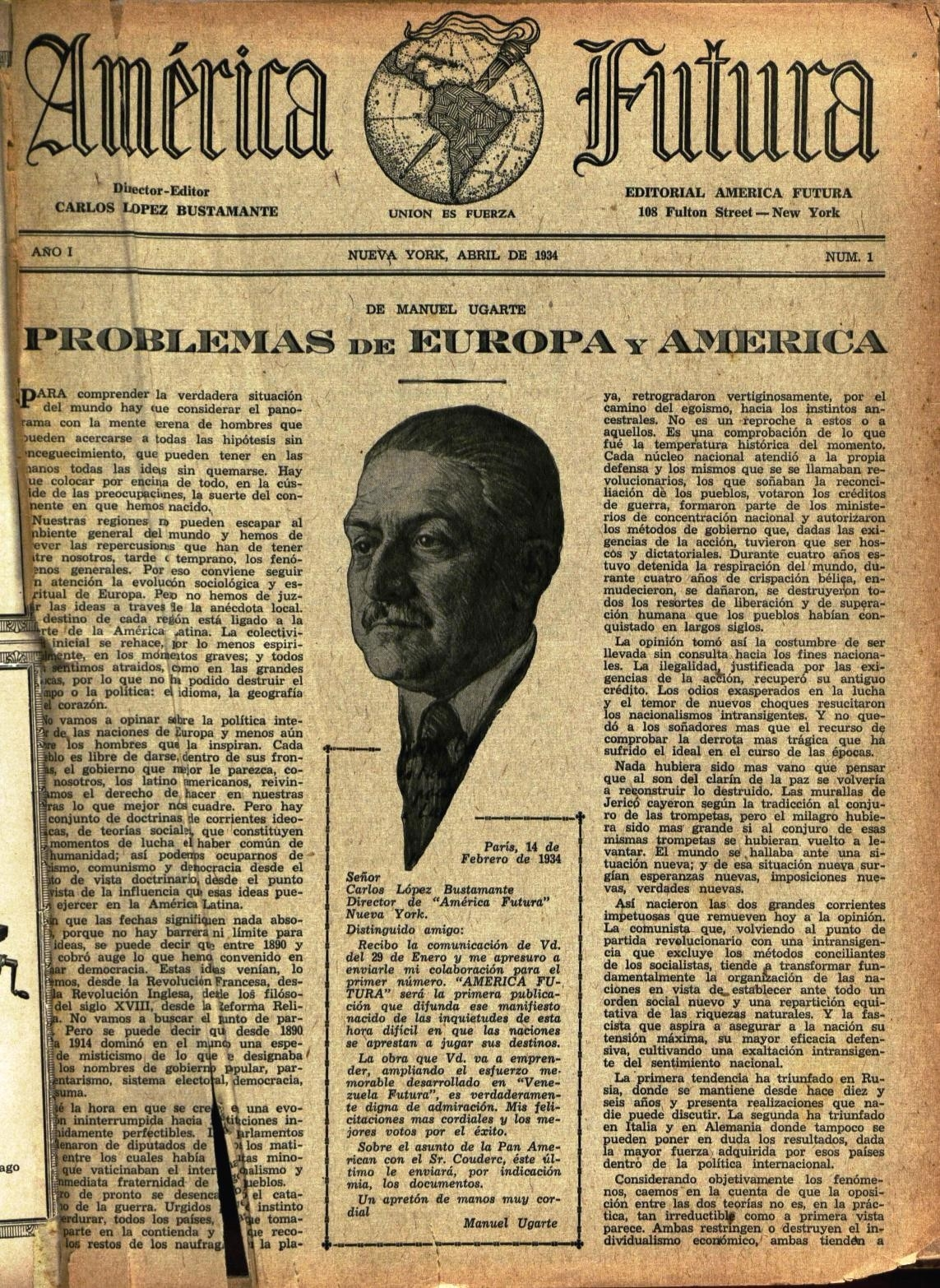
"América Futura", magazine edited by Carlos López Bustamante in New York.

Carlos López Bustamante's long exile made him one of the leading voices in the struggle against Gómez overseas. For nearly twenty years he was one of the leading figures of the resistance in exile. He used his pen and his knowledge of journalism, printing and publishing, to reveal to the world the horror of tyranny in Venezuela. For this he created his own printing press in New York City, "Carlos López Press", where he began publishing the famous magazine "Venezuela Futura" in opposition to Gómez. Many writers who had escaped from the prisons of the dictatorship collaborated on this magazine, including his relatives Rafael Bruzual López and Nestor Luis Pérez Luzardo. In 1934 the magazine's name was changed to "América Futura" with a message directed to Hispanic America to achieve the consolidation of democracy in the continent.

== Legacy ==
Carlos López Bustamante is remembered as a Venezuelan journalist and editor who opposed the government and advocated for freedom of expression in his publications. During his exile in New York City, he founded magazine "Venezuela Futura", published by López Bustamante. This magazine became an important platform for the opposition in Venezuela abroad and published criticism of the Gómez's government regime.

== See also ==
- Political prisoners in Venezuela

== Bibliography ==
- Nava, Ciro. Centuria Cultural del Zulia. Editorial Élite, Caracas, Venezuela, 1940.
- Pocaterra, José Rafael. Memorias de un Venezolano de la decandencia (Memoirs of a Venezuelan of decadence). Monte Ávila Latinamerican Editors, C.A., Caracas, Venezuela, 1997.
- Besson, Juan. Historia del Estado Zulia (History of the Zulia State). Hermanos Belloso Rossel Editorial, Maracaibo, Venezuela, 1943.
- Semprún, Jesús and Hernández, Guillermo, El Zulia's Dictionary, Ed. Sultana del Lago, Maracaibo, Venezuela, 2017
- Olivares, Atenógenes. Siluetas ilustres del Zulia (Famous silhouettes of Zulia). The Zulia State Government Press, Maracaibo, Venezuela, 1967.
- The New York Times. Here to report on teuton propaganda. Information published in the June 17, 1918 edition.
- Tarre Murzi, Alfredo. Biografía de Maracaibo (Biography of Maracaibo). Bodini S.A., Barcelona, Spain, 1986.
- Nagel Von Jess, Kurt. Algunas familias maracaiberas (Some Maracaibo families). The University of Zulia Press, Maracaibo, Venezuela, 1989.
- Velásquez, Ramón J. Epígrafes para un perfil de la Venezuela contemporánea (Epigraphs for a profile of contemporary Venezuela). Publications by the Francisco de Miranda University College, Caracas, Venezuela, 1982.
- Caballero, Manuel. Gómez, tirano liberal (Gómez liberal tyrant). Alfadil Editions, Caracas, Venezuela, 2003.
- Bermúdez, Nilda, Romero, María. Historia de un diario decimonónico: El Fonógrafo; sus aportes en el estudio de la cotidianidad maracaibera (History of a nineteenth-century newspaper: El Fonógrafo, its contribution to the study of daily life). Ágora Editorial, Trujillo, Trujillo State, Venezuela, 2006.
