= The World Academy of Sciences =

Merit-based science academy

- Abbreviation: TWAS
- Formation: 1983; 43 years ago
- Type: International nongovernmental organization
- Location: Trieste, Italy
- Region served: Worldwide
- President: Quarraisha Abdool Karim
- Website: twas.org

The World Academy of Sciences for the advancement of science in developing countries (TWAS) is a merit-based science academy established for developing countries, uniting more than 1,400 scientists in some 100 countries. Its principal aim is to promote scientific capacity and excellence for sustainable development in developing countries. It was formerly known as the Third World Academy of Sciences, named after the "third world" group of non-aligned states. Its headquarters is located on the premises of the International Centre for Theoretical Physics in Trieste, Italy.

== History ==
TWAS was founded in 1983 under the leadership of the Nobel Laureate Abdus Salam of Pakistan by a group of distinguished scientists who were determined to do something about the dismal state of scientific research in developing countries.

- Although developing countries account for 80% of the world's population, only 28% of the world's scientists hail from these countries. This fact reflects the lack of innovative potential necessary to solve real-life problems affecting poor nations.
- A chronic lack of funds for research often forces scientists in developing countries into intellectual isolation, jeopardizing their careers, their institutions and, ultimately, their nations.
- Scientists in developing countries tend to be poorly paid and gain little respect for their work because the role that scientific research can play in development efforts is underestimated. This in turn leads to brain drain in favour of the North that further impoverishes the South.
- Research institutions and universities in the South are under-funded, forcing scientists to work in difficult conditions and often with outdated equipment.

The founding members of TWAS therefore decided to set up an organization that would help to:

1. Recognize, support and promote excellence in scientific research in the South;
2. Provide promising scientists in the South with research facilities necessary for the advancement of their work;
3. Facilitate contacts between individual scientists and institutions in the South;
4. Encourage South–North cooperation between individuals and centres of scholarship;
5. Promote scientific research on major developing countries problems.

Since its inception, TWAS's operational expenses have largely been covered by generous contributions of the Italian government; since 1991 UNESCO has been responsible for the administration of TWAS finance and staff on the basis of an agreement signed by the director general of UNESCO and the president of TWAS.

It was named "Third World Academy of Sciences" until 2004 and "TWAS, the academy of sciences for the developing world" before September 2012, when it was renamed to is current name, "The World Academy of Sciences for the advancement of science in developing countries".

== Founding fellows ==
The founding fellows of 1983 include

- Hua Luogeng (1910–1985), China
- Nil Ratan Dhar (1892–1987), India
- Luis F. Leloir (1906–1987), Argentina
- Benjamin Peary Pal (1906–1989), India
- Ignacio Bernal (1910–1992), Mexico
- Gerardo Reichel-Dolmatoff (1912–1994), Colombia
- Emilio Rosenblueth (1926–1994), Mexico
- Salimuzzaman Siddiqui (1897–1994), Pakistan
- Abdus Salam (1926–1996), Pakistan
- Carlos Chagas Filho (1910–2000), Brazil
- Johanna Döbereiner (1924–2000), Brazil
- Gopalasamudram Narayana Ramachandran (1922–2001), India
- Thomas Risley Odhiambo (1931–2003), Kenya
- Marcel Roche (1920–2003), Venezuela
- Sivaramakrishna Chandrasekhar (1930–2004), India
- Thomas Adeoye Lambo (1923–2004), Nigeria
- Autar Singh Paintal (1925–2004), India
- Hélio Gelli Pereira (1918–1994), Brazil, United Kingdom
- Khem Singh Gill (1930–2019), India
- Ricardo Bressani Castignoli (1926–2015), Guatemala
- Daniel Adzei Bekoe (1928–2020), Ghana
- Albert Rakoto Ratsimamanga (1907-2001), Madagascar
- Félix Malu wa Kalenga (1936-2011), Democratic Republic of Congo
- Subrahmanyan Chandrasekhar (1909-1995), India, USA
- C.R. Rao (1920-2023), India, USA
- Shiing-Shen Chern (1911-2004), China, USA
- C.N.R. Rao (b.1934), India
- Sir Michael Atiyah (1929-2019), United Kingdom, Lebanon
- Baruj Benacerraf (1920-2011), Venezuela, USA
- Humberto Fernández-Morán (1924-1999), Venezuela, Sweden
- Ali Javan (1926-2016), Iran, USA
- Har Gobind Khorana (1922-2011), India, USA
- M. G. K. Menon (1928-2016), India
- Ricardo Miledi (1927-2017), Mexico
- César Milstein (1927-2004), Argentina, United Kingdom
- M.S. Swaminathan (1925-2023), India
- Yang Chen-Ning (1922–2025), China, USA
- Crodowaldo Pavan (1919-2009), Brazil
- Tsung-Dao Lee (1926–2024), China, USA
- Devendra Lal (1929-2012), India, USA
- Muhammad Akhtar (b. 1933), Pakistan, United Kingdom
- Samuel C.C. Ting (b. 1936), China, USA
- Héctor Croxatto (1908-2010), Chile

== TWAS Prize ==
TWAS Prize
- International award for contributions to Science
- Sponsored by: The World Academy of Sciences
- Country: Italy
- Formerly called: TWAS Awards in Basic Sciences (till 2003)
- Rewards: A bronze rectangular plaque embedded on a red base; US$ 15000
- First award: 1985
- Final award: 2016

Highlights
- Total awarded: 242
- Website: https://twas.org

The TWAS Prize is an annual award instituted in 1985 by TWAS to recognize excellence in scientific research in the global South. At inception, the award was titled TWAS Awards in Basic Sciences and was awarded in Physics, Chemistry, Biology and Mathematics categories but was merged with the TWNSO (Third World Network of Scientific Organizations) Prizes in Applied Sciences in 2003 to form the present-day TWAS Prize, which is awarded in nine categories viz. Agricultural Sciences, Biology, Chemistry, Earth Sciences, Engineering Sciences, Mathematics, Medical Sciences, Physics and Social Sciences. The award carries a plaque and a cash prize of US$ 15000 and is open to scientists living and working in a developing country.

== See also ==
- Organization for Women in Science for the Developing World
