= Luxburg-Carolath Cemetery =

Cemetery in Maracaibo, Venezuela

Luxburg-Carolath "El Cuadrado" Cemetery
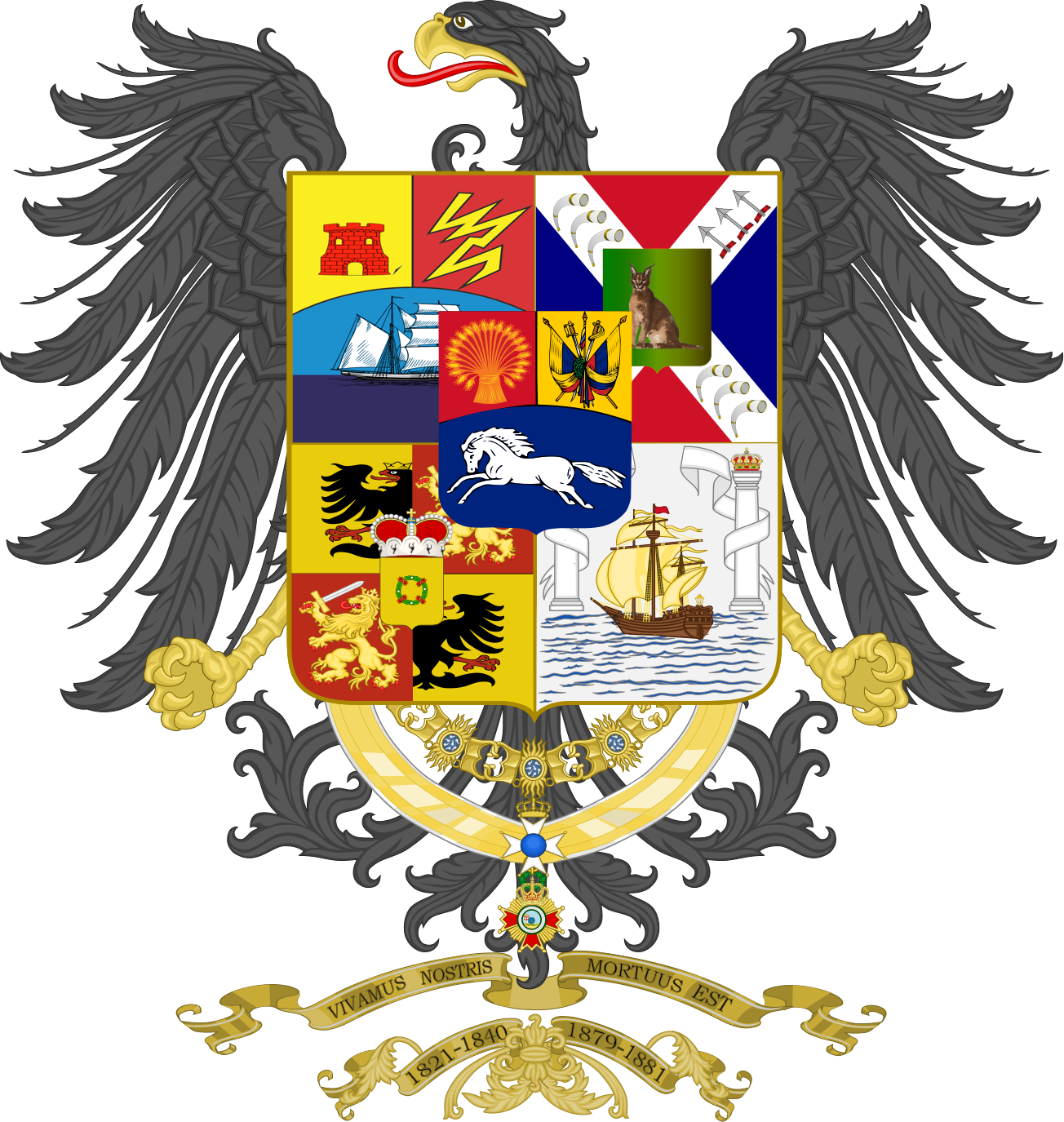
- Coats of Arms of the Luxburg-Carolath Cemetery
- Interactive map of Luxburg-Carolath "El Cuadrado" Cemetery

Details
- Established: 1879
- Location: Maracaibo
- Country: Venezuela
- Coordinates: 10.65°N 71.62°W
- Type: Private
- Website: www.fundacioncementeriocuadrado.com
- Find a Grave: Luxburg-Carolath "El Cuadrado" Cemetery

The Luxburg-Carolath Cemetery (Spanish: Cementerio Luxburg-Carolath), commonly known as El Cuadrado ("The Square") is a privately owned cemetery located in Maracaibo, Zulia, Venezuela. It is one of the oldest operating cemeteries in the country, and has over 10,000 interments.

== History ==
The Cuadrado cemetery was the first designated burial site of the city of Maracaibo in modern times; it was officially opened on 12 November 1879 as church grounds, where bodies were traditionally buried, were becoming overcrowded. The cemetery was given landmark status in Maracaibo in 2003. Since then, some graves have become derelict or otherwise defaced, but there have been efforts made to preserve the site. Notable to the cemetery is its architecture, which spans various styles including Baroque, Neoclassical, and Eclectic, and the various notable people and families interred. In 2018, it was estimated that 10,630 bodies rest in the cemetery; the state of Zulia began building a museum on the site this year, about the cemetery and people buried there, which was also supported by the German Luxburg Carolath Foundation.

== Notable burials ==
- Ambrosio Alfínger
- Jesús Enrique Lossada
- Ismael Urdaneta
- Francisco Eugenio Bustamante
- Francisco Ochoa Bustamante
- Jesús María Portillo
- José Antonio Borjas Romero
- José Ramón Yépez
- Manuel Dagnino
- Antonio José Urquinaona
- Manuel Trujillo Durán
- Guillermo Quintero Luzardo
- Eduardo Mathyas Lossada
- Julio Árraga
- Udón Pérez
- Antonio Pulgar
- Humberto Fernández Morán
- Julio Árraga
- Antonio Borjas Romero
- Lucas Evangelista Rincón
- Manuel Belloso
- Rafael Belloso Chacín
- Fray Junípero de la Escalada
- Eduardo López Rivas
- Eduardo López Bustamante
- Joaquín Esteva Parra
- Eduardo Pérez Fabelo
- Kurt Nagel Von Jess

== Sources ==
- Tarre Murzi, Alfredo: Biografía de Maracaibo ((in English): Maracaibo Biography), Ed. Bodini S.A., Barcelona, Spain, 1986.
- El Zulia Ilustrado, Facsimile reproduction, Ed. Belloso Foundation, Maracaibo, Venezuela, 1965.
- Nava, Ciro: Centuria cultural del Zulia, Élite Editorial, Caracas, Venezuela, 1940.
- Nagel Von Jess, Kurt:Algunas familias maracaiberas ((in English): Some Maracaibo families), University of Zulia Press, Maracaibo, Venezuela, 1989.
- Ocando Yamarte, Gustavo: Historia del Zulia ((in English): The History of Zulia). Arte Editorial, Caracas, Venezuela, 1996.
- Gómez Espinosa, Antonio: Historia fundamental del Zulia ((in English): Critical History of Zulia), Editor Jean Baissari, Maracaibo, Venezuela, 1984.
- Plumacher, Eugene H.: Memorias ((in English): Memoirs). Ciudad Solar Editors, historic heritage of Zulia state, Maracaibo, Venezuela, 2003.
