= El Fonógrafo =

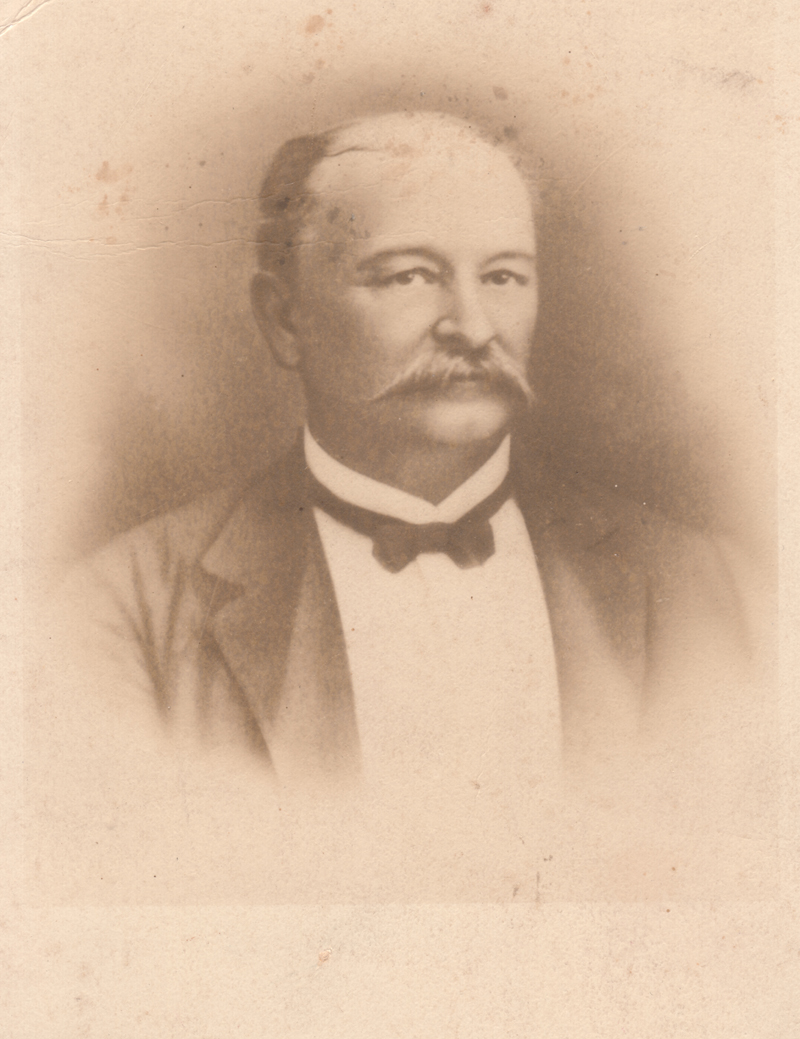
Eduardo López Rivas, founder of "El Fonógrafo".

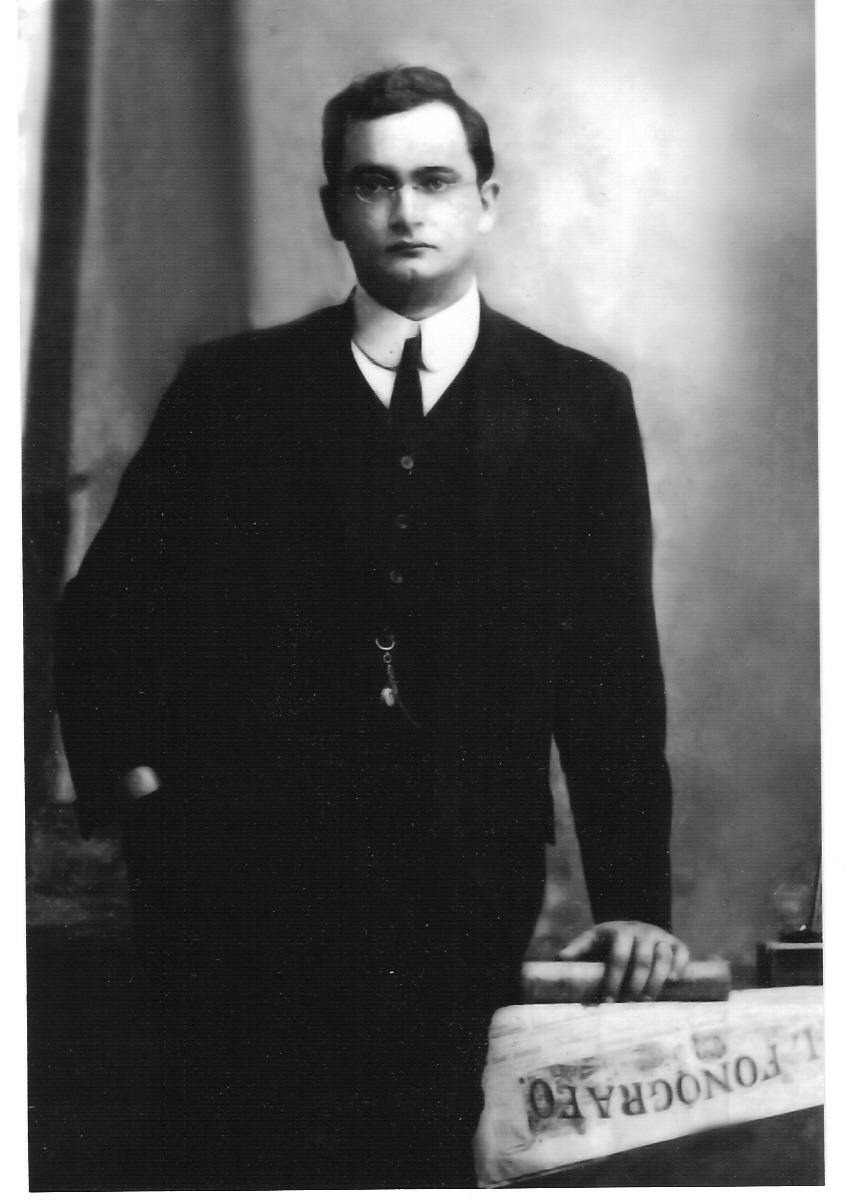
Eduardo López Bustamante, director of "El Fonógrafo".

Diario El Fonógrafo (The Daily Phonograph) was one of the most prominent Venezuelan newspapers in the later 19th century and early 20th century. It was founded in 1879 by editor and journalist Eduardo López Rivas in Maracaibo, Zulia state, Venezuela.

== History ==
The first issue of El Fonógrafo was published in May 1879. The newspaper started when the Western World was inspired by the philosophy of Positivism, technological progress, development of modern cities, and innovations like that of Thomas Edison; whose newspaper was named after his invention. Phonograph was a new word, product of the innovation of a machine that reproduced sounds and, overall, the human voice. In giving this name to the newspaper López Rivas, more than to politics, wanted to associate El Fonografo´s content to innovation, progress and civilization.

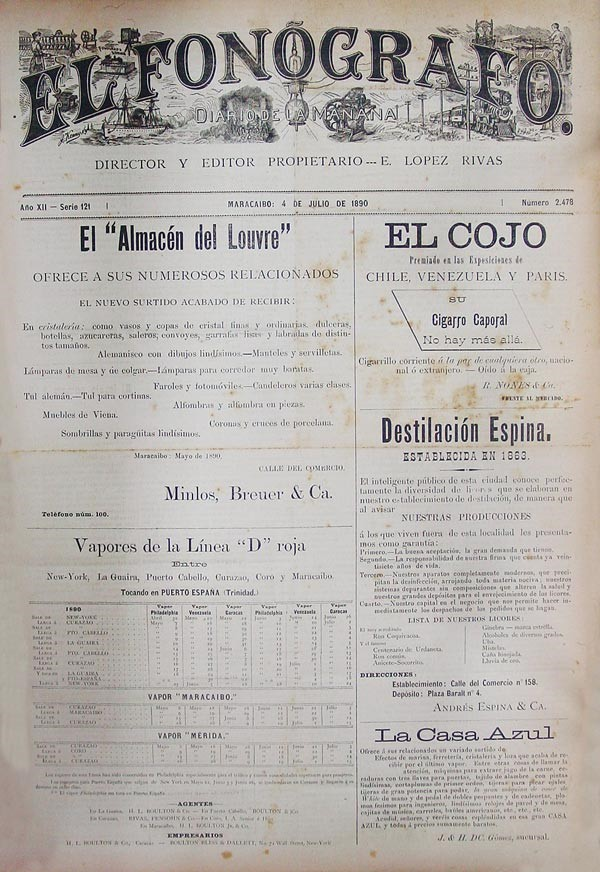
Front page of "El Fonógrafo" at the end of the 19th century

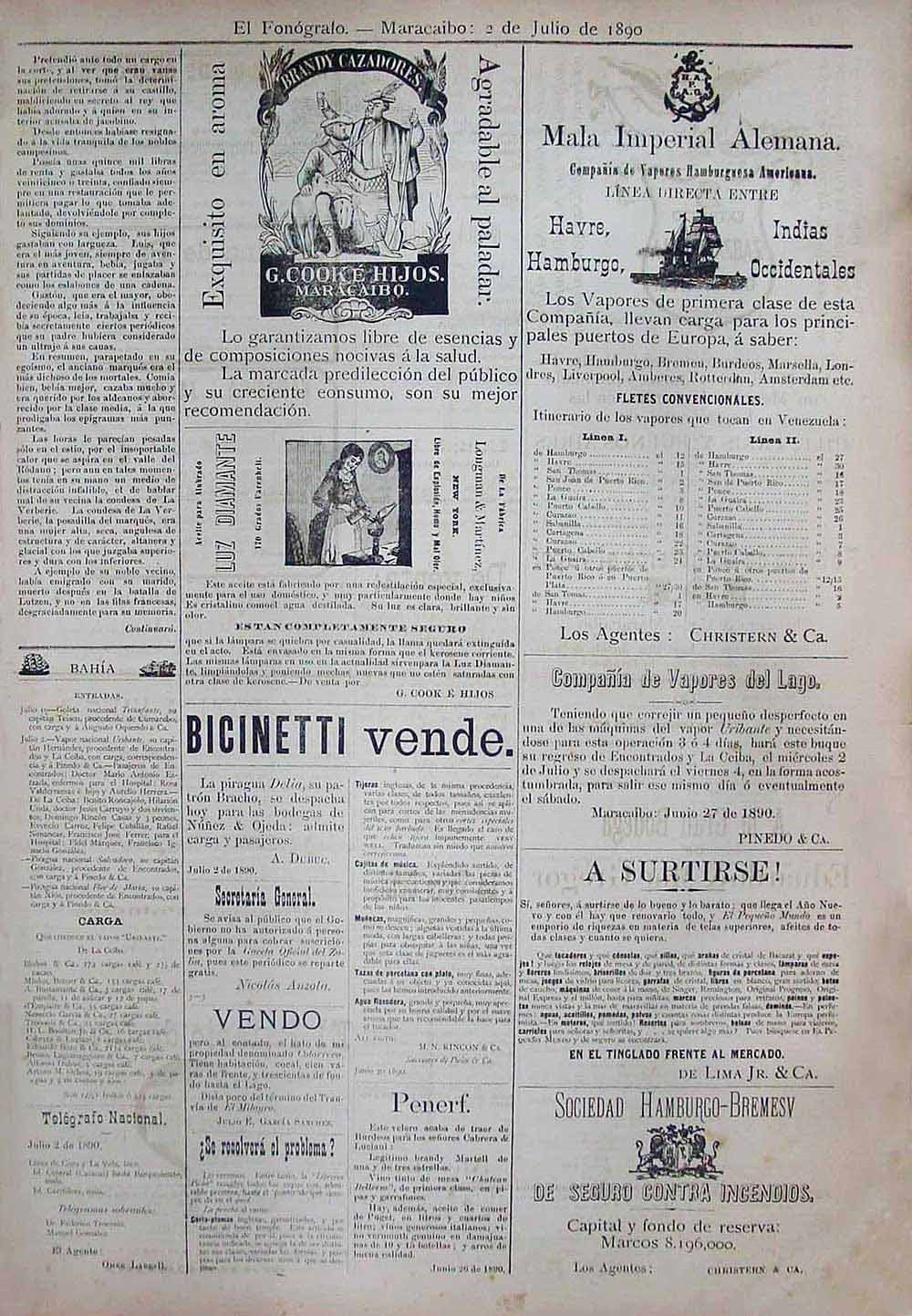
"El Fonógrafo" in the 19th century

Eduardo López Rivas had founded several newspapers in Caracas, before he moved to his hometown Maracaibo and started El Fonógrafo. Due to the political content of those newspapers he had been persecuted, imprisoned, exiled and ruined. El Fonógrafo started when it had just ended a period of conflicts in the state of Zulia, caused by the temporary closure of the port of Maracaibo by the central government. With the reopening of the port and the consequent reactivation of the local economy, a new era was starting in that region of Venezuela. Political conflicts of the past seemed to be over and López Rivas tried to create a modern newspaper, associated with a new era of progress.

The newspaper was issued twice a week until 1882, when it became a daily publication. The issue increased then from one page to four pages with news, literature and ads. It was printed in local workshops in Maracaibo until López Rivas created in 1881 his own publishing house, Imprenta Americana. This publishing house had the most advanced techniques of the time and that made possible to issue a modern newspaper of high quality in printing and graphic arts.

== Opposition to Guzmán Blanco ==
When López Rivas founded El Fonógrafo in Maracaibo, the president of Venezuela was General Antonio Guzmán Blanco. Guzmán Blanco was an autocratic ruler who never had a goodwill to the people of Zulia because of their love for freedom. U.S. consul in Maracaibo between 1878 and 1919, Eugene Plumacher, writes in his memoirs that Guzmán Blanco felt animosity toward the people of Zulia state because of their very independent spirit. According to Plumacher they were the most freedom-loving people of all Venezuelans.

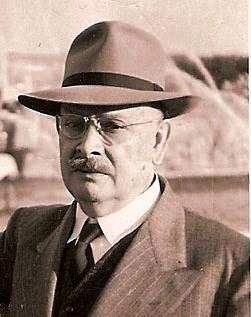
Carlos López Bustamante, director of the Caracas edition of "El Fonógrafo"

The problems of Zulia state were ignored by the government and the city of Maracaibo looked in deplorable state. El Fonógrafo became a strong opponent to Guzmán Blanco launching campaigns related to the most serious local and national problems. It reported constantly the government failure in social welfare matters, particularly those related to the state of Zulia and to Maracaibo. Because of its independent information policies the newspaper was closed down by the government several times, but its moral prestige made it possible for El Fonógrafo to restart, over and over, and to survive 38 years of censorship and dictatorship.

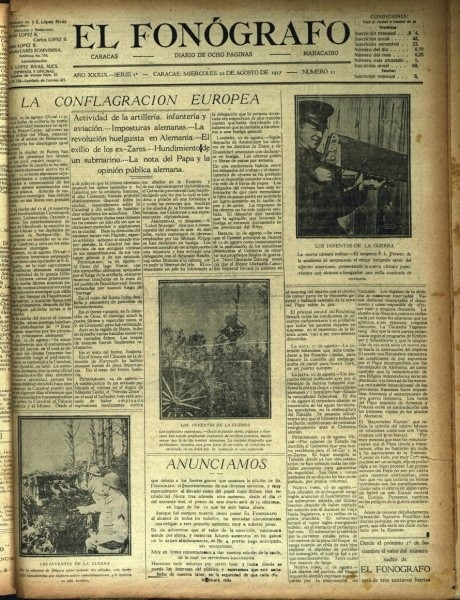
Front page of "El Fónógrafo" during World War I

Plumacher writes about the precarious situation of freedom of expression in Venezuela by that time, particularly in the case of El Fonógrafo: The newspapers that dared to speak negatively about the president´s policy were simply closed down by the government, as was the case of El Fonógrafo. This newspaper was (and still is) one of the best-run newspapers in Venezuela, modest and refined in its words but firm and serious in matters related to public welfare. Plumacher also writes about one of the many occasions when government troops entered the offices of El Fonógrafo and confiscated everything. All the machinery of El Fonógrafo´s workshop was sent to the government office in Maracaibo, to edit a newspaper that supported president Antonio Guzmán Blanco.

== López Dynasty ==
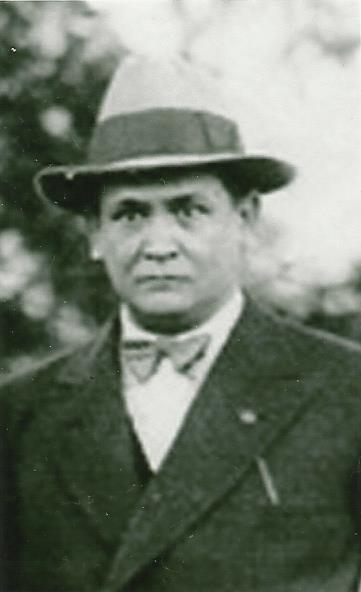
Enrique López Bustamante, correspondent of "El Fonógrafo" in Madrid

In 1908 López Rivas eldest son, Eduardo López Bustamante, became the director of El Fonógrafo. He and his brothers, Enrique and Carlos López Bustamante, as well as his sister Teresa López Bustamante, were all educated as journalists under their father principles. According to author Alfredo Tarre Murzi they took over El Fonógrafo and became a true dynasty of writers.

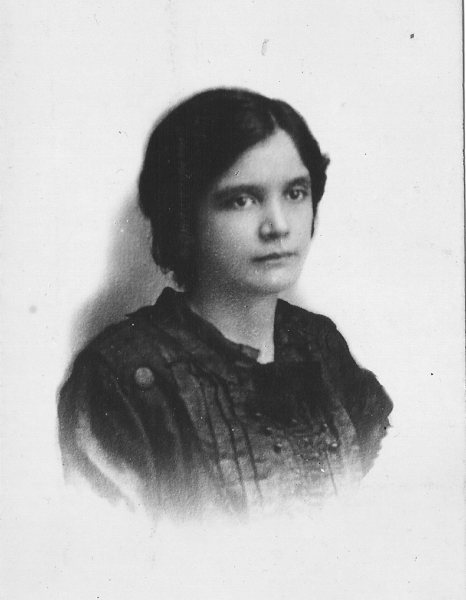
Journalist Teresa López Bustamante

Eduardo López Bustamante carried on El Fonógrafo´s information policy initiated by his father. He was appointed director the same year that Juan Vicente Gómez became the president of Venezuela and imposed a strong censorship. According to author José Rafael Pocaterra, due to its independent editorials El Fonógrafo was constantly threatened by the government. In his book "Memorias de un Venezolano de la decadencia" (Memories of a Venezuelan in decline) he refers to the Gómez regime as a tyranny far more brutal than the previous ones. The previous despotic regimes, writes Pocaterra, had respected the newspaper, whose material progress was a result of its enormous moral responsibility.

=== World War I ===
When World War I started in 1914, Gómez favored the German Empire in the conflict while maintaining a veneer neutrality against the allied community. In 1917, Eduardo López Bustamante started a simultaneous edition of El Fonógrafo in Caracas, under the direction of his younger brother Carlos López Bustamante. According to the writer and columnist of El Fonógrafo, José Rafael Pocaterra, the capital's edition enjoyed great popularity from the beginning because, unlike other Venezuelan newspapers of the time, El Fonógrafo sympathized with the Allies. This position annoyed Gómez who, thereafter, decided to put an end to the newspaper. In words of writer Pocaterra anonymous and insulting threats rained down during those days.

The newspaper's policy in favor of the Allies resulted in economic imbalance for El Fonógrafo because most of its advertisements, that came from German imports and trading firms, began to be withdrawn. Government pressure on the newspaper became more intense, but Eduardo López Bustamante did not change El Fonógrafo´s editorial line.

On August 23, 1917, the newspaper was raided by the government troops. The headquarters of El Fonógrafo in Caracas and Maracaibo were closed permanently ending with it, writes José R. Pocaterra, the efforts of two generations...and 38 years of the great Zulia newspaper.
