= Raïssa Malu =

Congolese physicist, educator and politician

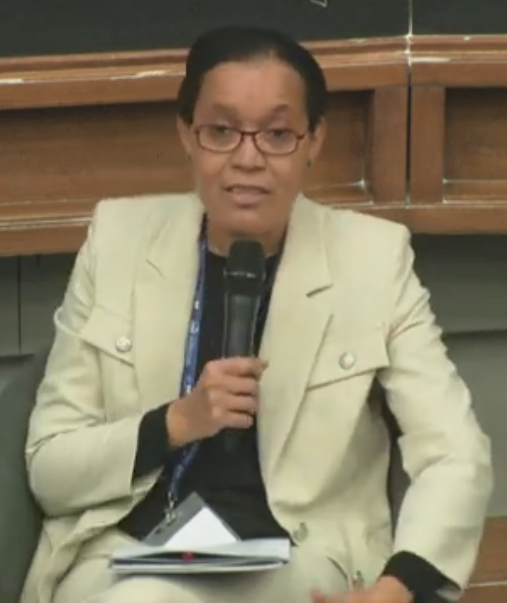
- In an ICTP panel discussion in 2024

Minister of National Education and New Citizenship for the Government of the Democratic Republic of the Congo
- Incumbent
- Assumed office 29 May 2024
- President: Félix Tshisekedi
- Prime Minister: Sama Lukonde; Judith Suminwa
- Preceded by: Tony Mwaba Kazadi

Personal details
- Born: Kinshasa, Democratic Republic of the Congo (DRC)
- Parent: Félix Malu wa Kalenga
- Education: UCLouvain
- Profession: Physicist and educator

Raïssa Malu Dinanga is a Congolese physicist, international education consultant, writer and politician. From 29 May 2024, she has served as Minister of National Education and New Citizenship for the Government of the Democratic Republic of the Congo (DRC).

== Biography ==
Malu was born in Kinshasa, Democratic Republic of the Congo (DRC). Her father Félix Malu wa Kalenga (1936–2011) was a nuclear physicist at the Regional Center for Nuclear Studies in Kinshasa.

Malu studied at UCLouvain in Louvain-la-Neuve, Wallonia, Belgium, and lived in Belgium for seven years. After graduating, Malu worked as a computer scientist for a bank and as a research assistant in the nuclear industry. She left the private sector to work as a science and mathematics teacher and returned to the DRC.

In 2014, Malu founded a non-profit organization that organises the DRC's annual Science and Technology Week in Kinshasa. Malu has written education textbooks and is editor of the Les Indispensables textbook series. She was also been an Ambassador for the African Institute for Mathematical Sciences' (AIMS) Next Einstein Forum (2017–2019).

From 2016 to 2021, Malu headed the PEQPESU project (Education Project for the Quality and Relevance of Teaching at Secondary and University Levels) of the Ministry of Primary, Secondary and Technical Education (EPST), with the support of the World Bank. In this role, she assessed the quality of teaching across the DRC.

Malu served as Honorary Member of the DRC's Presidential Panel of the African Union (2021–2022), focusing on education, youth, science, technology, and innovation. She was one of two female members of the panel.

On 29 May 2024, Malu was appointed as Minister of National Education and New Citizenship for the Government of the Democratic Republic of the Congo in the Suminwa government. Malu is the second woman to lead this Ministry in the history of the DRC. As Minister, Malu has introduced artificial intelligence to automate exam marking and reduce the cost of marking national exams. Plans have also been introduced to issue electronic diplomas to enhance security and preserve education credentials.

Malu is a Member of the Belgian Royal Academy for Overseas Sciences (RAOS). She is a member of the International Advisory Committee of the African Strategy for Fundamental and Applied Physics (ASFAP) initiative.
