= Diamond knife =

Knife in which the edge is made from diamond

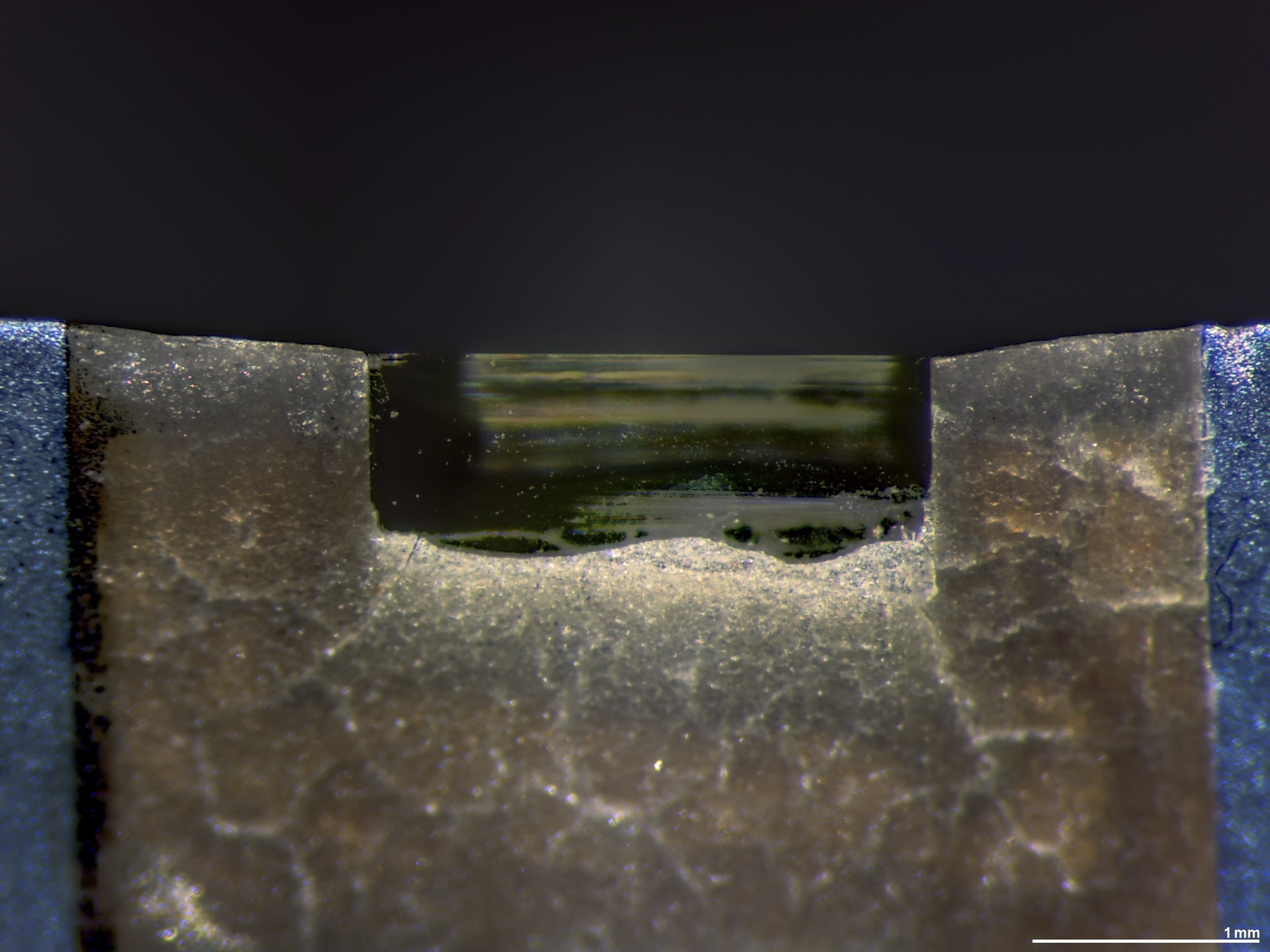
Diamond knife blade

A diamond knife is a very sharp knife in which the edge is made from diamond, invented by Humberto Fernández-Morán in 1955. Diamond knives are used for medical and scientific applications where an extremely sharp and long-lasting edge is essential. The knives are very expensive to purchase, depending on the quality and size of the knife; in addition the knives must be professionally sharpened as the edge dulls.

== Eye surgery ==
Diamond knives are used in eye surgery, specifically in refractive surgery.

In particular they are the main tool, together with the microscope, for the radial keratotomy invented by Svyatoslav Fyodorov to correct myopia and for the Mini Asymmetric Radial Keratotomy (M.A.R.K.), invented by Marco Abbondanza to correct astigmatism and cure the first and second stages of keratoconus.

== Ultramicrotomy ==
Metal microtome knives or razor blades are too soft and dull to cut ultrathin sections. In 1950, Latta and Hartmann discovered that the edge of broken glass could be used to cut thin sections of specimens for transmission electron microscopy. Glass knives are used in ultramicrotomy for trimming specimen blocks and cutting thin and ultrathin sections. A skilled operator can cut a small number of ultrathin sections with a glass knife, while the same operator can use a diamond knife to cut thousands of sections on one area of knife. Some hard specimens, such as bone, plants, thick-walled spores, metals and ceramics are difficult to cut, even with a good glass knife, because the edge dulls too quickly.

Humberto Fernández-Morán discovered that a gem-quality diamond, the hardest known material, could be used to fabricate a more durable knife for use in the ultramicrotomy. Diamond knives are both delicate and expensive, usually costing several thousand dollars. Natural gemstones used to produce diamond knives are usually pale yellow, of regular crystal structure and of the greatest possible purity. The grinding process usually reduces the stones to 50% of their original weight.

The diamond blade is then mounted into a soft metal shaft (Wood's metal) and polished to a very sharp edge. The knife's edge is extremely sharp and free of imperfections, which helps produce ultrathin sections of very regular thickness, to get views of specimens at high magnifications with the transmission electron microscope (TEM). The shaft containing the final edge is then mounted in a metal trough, or "boat", and cemented, usually with an epoxy plastic. Diamond knives are also used for specimen preparation in atomic force microscopy.

== Types ==
There are many styles and types of diamond knives. For the most part, they can be made for use dry or wet. Blade angles of diamond knives vary from 35 to 60 degrees. The smaller angled knives are used for finer cutting, but these knives are prone to damage. Wide angle knives have better life expectancy.

== See also ==
- Diamond blade
- Obsidian knife
