= Félix Malu wa Kalenga =

Congolese emeritus professor of Nuclear Physics and a scientist

- Born: September 22, 1936
- Died: April 22, 2011 (aged 74)
- Citizenship: Democratic Republic of Congo
- Education: Lovanium University; University of California; Catholic University of Louvain
- Known for: The construction of the Triga Mark II reactor
- Children: Raïssa Malu
- Scientific career
- Fields: Nuclear Physics
- Workplaces: General Commission for Atomic Energy (CGEA) in the DRC; Regional Center for Nuclear Studies in Kinshasa; University of Kinshasa

Félix Malu wa Kalenga (September 22, 1936 — April 22, 2011) was a Congolese emeritus professor of Nuclear Physics and a scientist. He was a founding member of the Third World Academy of Science (TWAS). He was a professor at Lovanium University and a Dean of the Polytechnic Faculty of the University of Kinshasa. He was also a commissioner of the general commission for atomic energy (CGEA) in the DRC and a director general of the regional center for nuclear studies in Kinshasa.

== Early life and education ==
Malu was born on September 22, 1936, in Boma, Congo. He obtained a BSc in Electrical Engineering and Electronics from Lovanium University in 1962. He obtained his MSc at the University of California, Berkeley, in 1963 and in 1969, he earned his doctorate degree in applied sciences at the Université catholique de Louvain.

== Career ==
=== Academic career ===
He was a professor at the Faculty of Applied Sciences at the University of Kinshasa, Democratic Republic of the Congo (DRC); he became the dean of the institution in 1970 and in 2000 he became an emeritus professor.

=== Scientific career ===
Malu wa Kalenga led construction of the Triga Mark II reactor at the Regional Center for Nuclear Studies in Kinshasa. From 1965 to 2000 he was a Commissioner at the General Commission for Atomic Energy (CGEA) in the DRC and a Director General of the Kinshasa Regional Center for Nuclear Studies.

== Fellowship and membership ==
He was a founding member of the World Academy of Sciences (TWAS), a member of the board of governors of the International Atomic Energy Agency (IAEA), Vienna. A board member of the United Nations University, in Tokyo and he was also a member of the OAU Scientific Council, a member of the advisory scientific council of the Theoretical Physics Agency of Trieste, Italy, a member of the scientific advisory board of the International Atomic Energy Agency (IAEA), Vienna, and a member of the Vatican Pontifical Academy of Sciences for Applied Physics.

== Death ==
Malu wa Kalenga died on April 22, 2011.
