= Glass knife =

Knife with a blade made from glass

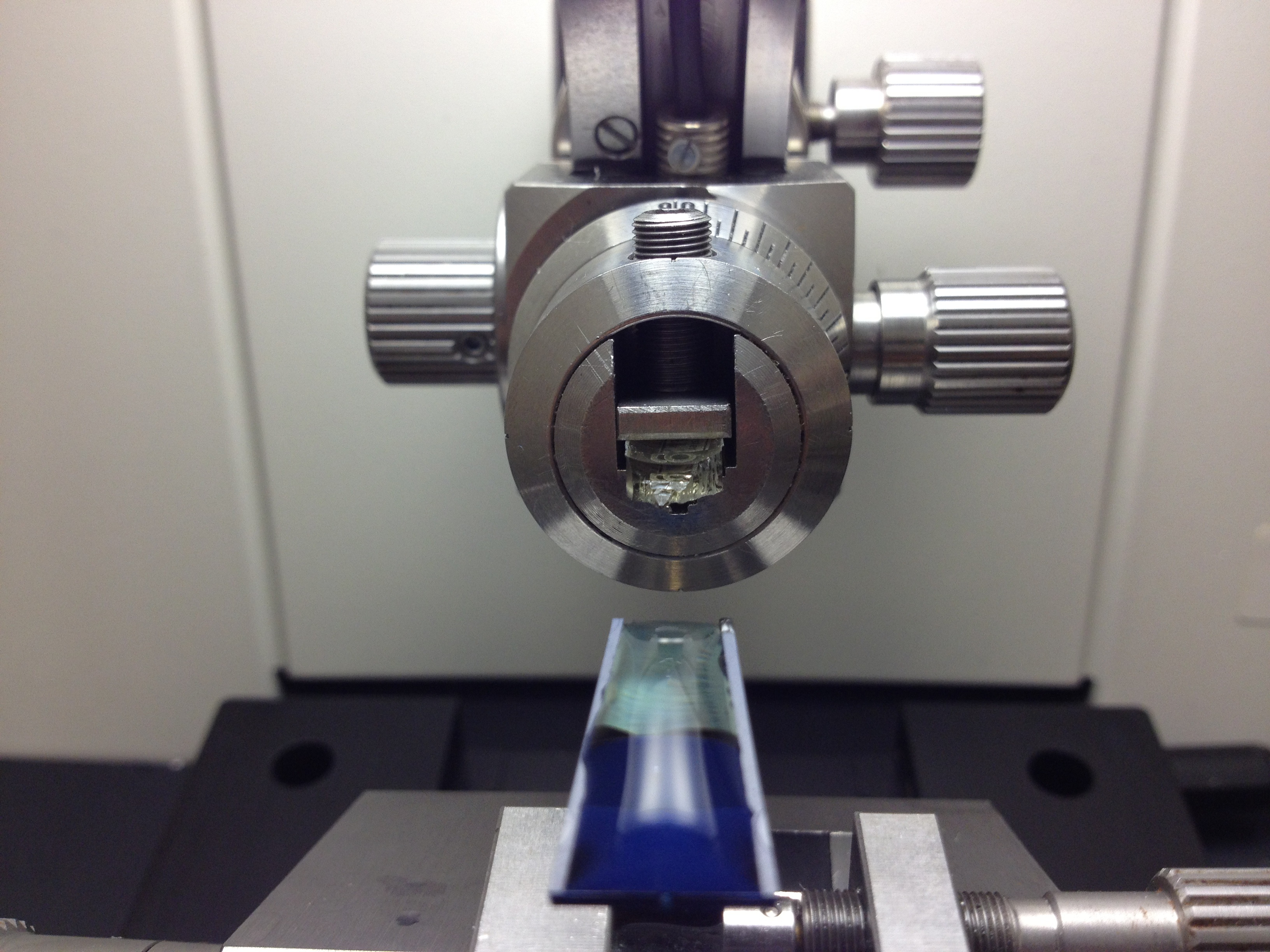
Ultramicrotome with a glass knife

A glass knife is a knife with a blade made of glass, with a fracture line forming an extremely sharp cutting edge.

Glass knives were used in antiquity due to their natural sharpness and the ease with which they could be manufactured. In modern electron microscopy glass knives are used to make the ultrathin sections needed for imaging.

== History ==
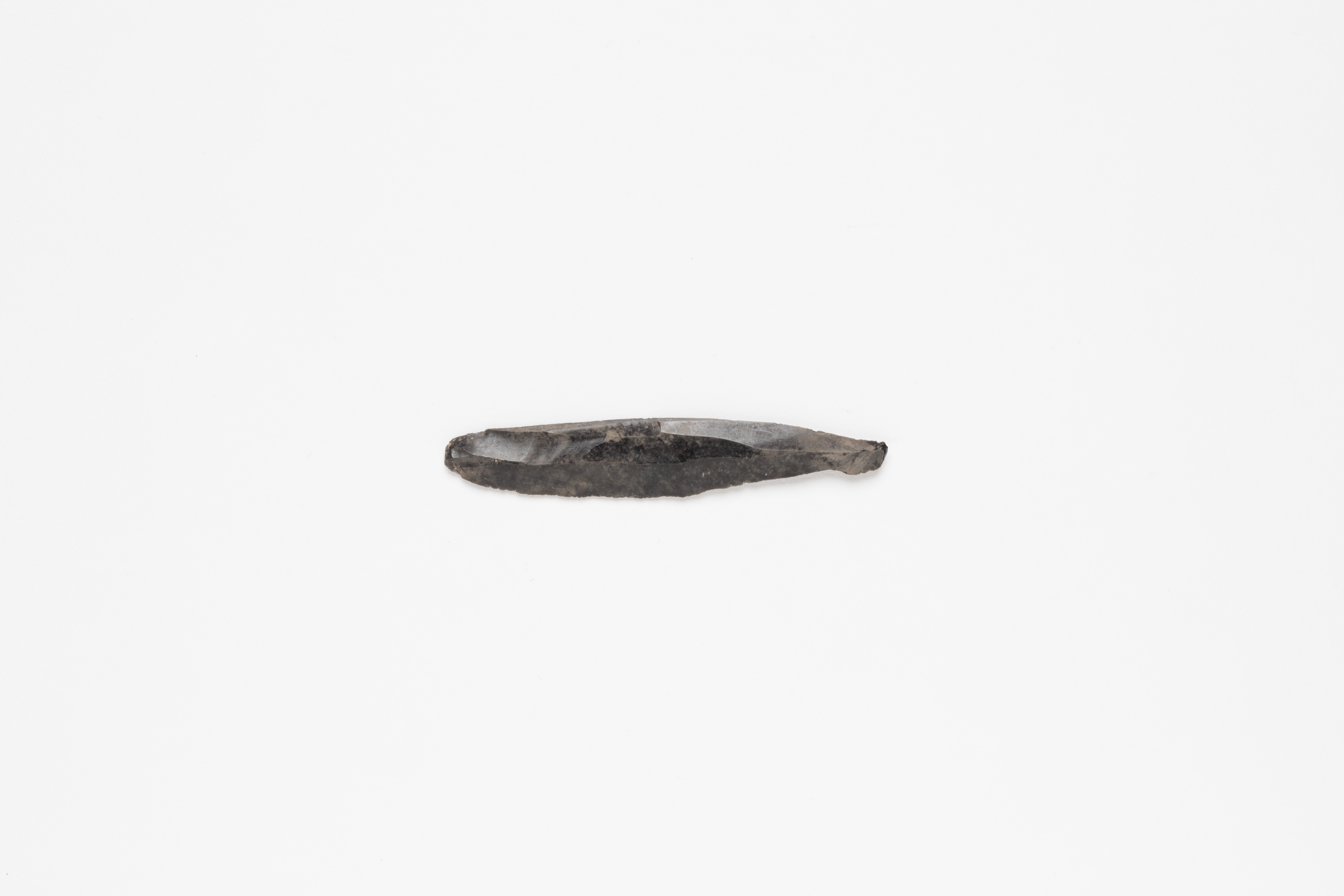
An obsidian knife made before 5800 BCE

In the Stone Age, bladed tools were made by chipping suitable stones which broke with a conchoidal fracture, a process known as knapping or lithic reduction. The same technique was used to make tools, including knives, out of obsidian, natural volcanic glass.

From the 1920s until the 1940s, Dur-X glass fruit and cake knives were sold for use in kitchens under a 1938 US Patent. Before the wide availability of inexpensive stainless steel cutlery, they were used for cutting citrus fruit, tomatoes and other acidic foods, the flavor of which would be tainted by steel knives and which would stain ordinary steel knives. They were molded in tempered glass, with a cutting edge ground sharp.

== Modern use ==
While glass knives as such are no longer in general use, knives with ceramic blades made from zirconium dioxide have been available since the mid-1980s, with a very sharp and long-lasting edge produced by grinding rather than fracturing.

Modern glass knives were once the blade of choice for the ultra-thin sectioning required in transmission electron microscopy because they can be manufactured by hand and are sharper than softer metal blades because the crystalline structure of metals makes it impossible to obtain a continuous sharp edge. The advent of diamond knives, which keep their edge much longer and are more suitable for cutting hard materials, quickly relegated glass knives to a second-rate status. However, some labs still use glass knives because they are significantly less expensive than diamond knives. A common practice is to use a glass knife to cut the block which contains the sample to near the location of the specimen to be examined. Then the glass knife is replaced by a diamond blade for the actual ultrathin sectioning. This extends the life of the diamond blade which is used only when its superior performance is critical.

Obsidian, a naturally occurring volcanic glass, is used to make extremely sharp surgical scalpels, significantly sharper than is possible with steel. The blades are brittle and very easily broken.

== Manufacture ==
Glass knives can be produced by hand using pliers with two raised bumps on one jaw and a single bump between the two bumps on the opposing jaw, but special machines called "knife-makers" are used in most electron microscopy laboratories to ensure repeatable results. The glass used typically starts out as 1-inch-wide (25 mm) strips of 1/4-inch-thick (6.4 mm) plate glass, which is cut into 1 inch (2.5 cm) squares. The glass square is then scored across the diagonal with a steel or tungsten carbide glass-cutting wheel to determine where the square will break, and pressure is then applied gradually across the opposite diagonal until the square breaks. This technique provides two usable knife edges, one on each of the two resulting triangles. The better the break is aligned with the diagonal, the better the cutting edge.

== In popular culture ==
- Glass knives are the weapon of choice of the antagonist Dmitri "Raven" Ravinoff in the 1992 novel Snow Crash because they are undetectable by security systems and are said in the book to be molecule-thin at the edges, sharp enough to penetrate bulletproof vests.
- Glass knives are the weapon of choice for most Mistborn in Brandon Sanderson's fantasy novel series of the same name (Mistborn), due to the lack of metal that other Allomancers would be able to Push or Pull on.
- Glass weapons are usable by either the protagonist or enemies in The Elder Scrolls series of video games. The weapons are depicted as having a green, semi-transparent color and are generally end-game equipment, having higher statistics than most weapons. There is also glass armor, end-game light armor.
- Game of Thrones: Obsidian, colloquially known as dragon glass, is a recurring element in the setting. Blades made from it are among the few things that can kill a White Walker.
- The titular weapon in Larry Niven's short story What Good is a Glass Dagger?
- A hardened glass knife is the tool of choice for the protagonist Joshua Valiente in the Long Earth series by Terry Pratchett and Stephen Baxter, as it can travel through the various parallel worlds without hindrance due to its lack of ferrous components.
- A Murano glass dagger features in Ruth Rendell's mystery "The Bridesmaid".
