= Muhammad Akhtar (biochemist) =

British-Pakistani biochemist (born 1933)

Muhammad Akhtar FRS (Urdu: محمد اختر; born 23 February 1933) is a British-Pakistani biochemist, and former Director General of the School of Biological Sciences, at the University of the Punjab.

== Biography ==
He spent the years 1959 to 1963 doing science research in Cambridge, Massachusetts before moving to the University of Southampton, UK as a lecturer, then reader and then Professor of Biochemistry (1973-1978). From 1978 until 1991 he was head of the Department of Biochemistry. He was chairman of the School of Biochemical and Physiological Sciences from 1983 to 1987 and chairman of the Institute of Biomolecular Sciences from 1989 to 1991. He was a founding fellow of the Third World Academy of Sciences in 1984 and a director of the SERC Centre for Molecular Recognition from 1990 to 1994.

He was appointed Director General of the School of Biological Sciences at the University of the Punjab, Lahore, Pakistan in 2002. He is also an emeritus professor of the University of Southampton. He is also an honorary fellow at the University College London.

He was elected a Fellow of the Royal Society (FRS) in 1980 under the recommendation of a notable Biochemist George Joseph Popják (FRS). He mentions this proposal in a memoir he authored for the FRS:

In 1977 I was surprised and delighted to receive Popják’s letter, from Los Angeles, in which he expressed appreciation for my ‘beautiful’ work and suggested that he would like to propose me for Fellowship of The Royal Society—which he did. But to ensure that I did not get overexcited by the prospects of a successful outcome too soon, in a subsequent letter he gave me the following fatherly advice:

“Please forget now the affair as nobody gets into the Royal on the first call. It takes at least three years for the best of candidates to be called to sign the book a few pages further away from Newton and Wren.”

But as Popják had predicted I was elected in 1980, exactly three years from the time of proposal.

Prof. Akhtar and his wife Monika Akhtar have authored Biographical Memoirs of Fellows of the Royal Society including Adolf Butenandt, George Popják, and Salimuzzaman Siddiqui.
