= Eduardo López Rivas =

Venezuelan journalist and editor

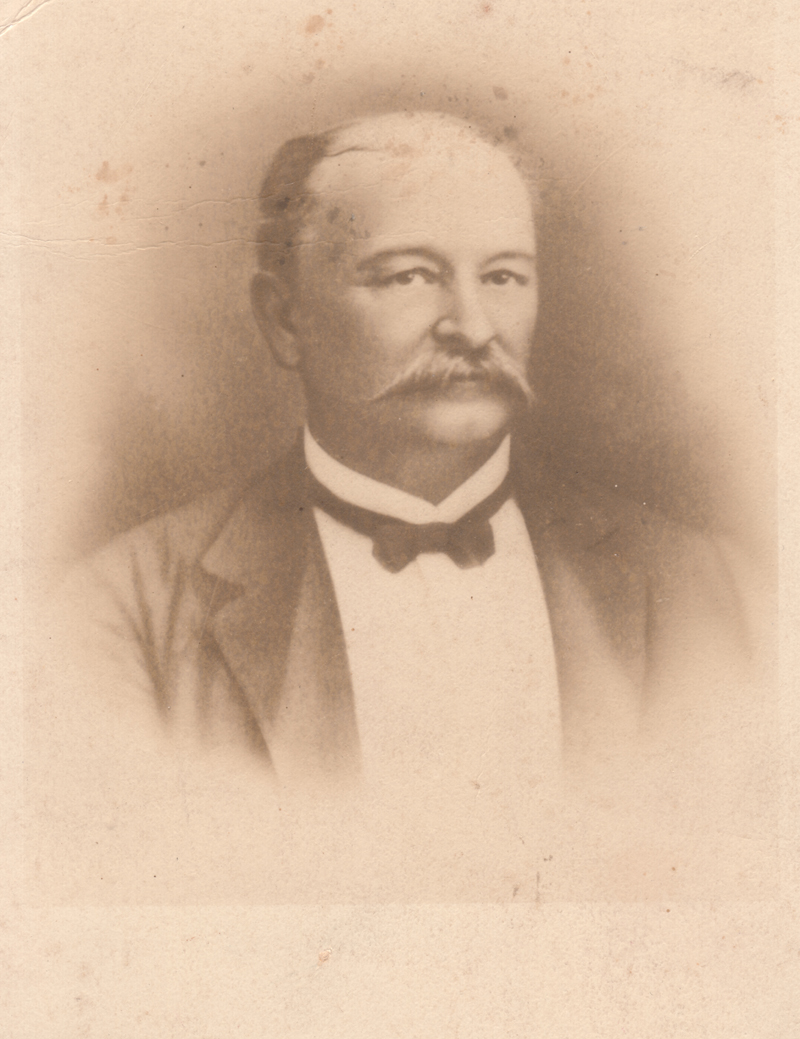
- Born: 10 September 1850 Maracaibo, Venezuela
- Died: 22 July 1913 (aged 62) Maracaibo, Venezuela
- Occupation: Journalist and editor

Eduardo López Rivas (10 September 1850 – 22 July 1913) was a Venezuelan editor and journalist. He founded and directed several Venezuelan publications throughout his life, among them the newspaper Diario El Fonógrafo and the magazine El Zulia ilustrado. He was the founder and owner of a Venezuelan editorial house, Imprenta Americana, the first publishing house to print photographs in Venezuelan periodical publications.

== Biography ==
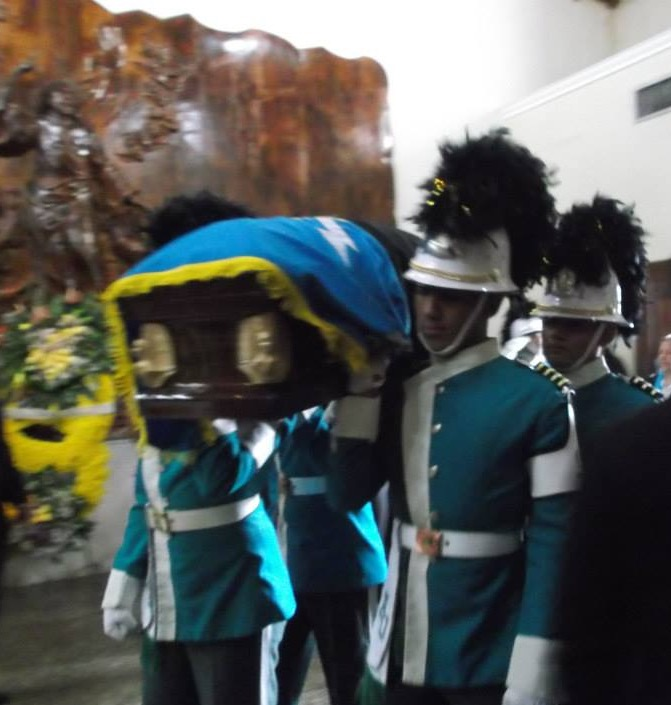
Remains of Eduardo López Rivas enter Panteón of Zulia State, on 24 February 2015.

Eduardo López Rivas was born in Maracaibo, Venezuela, on 15 September 1850. His mother was Encarnación Rivas and his father was Eduardo López de Triana y Espina, one of the founding members of the Great Liberal Party of Venezuela. He studied at Colegio Federal del Zulia until the age of fifteen, when he was sent by his parents to Marseille, France, to continue his education. The years he lived in France made him a keen supporter of the ideals of freedom of the French Republic.

When he returned to Venezuela he started to work as a teacher of languages and professional drawing, but the autocratic government of president Antonio Guzmán Blanco motivated him to do something for freedom. This fact led him to start his career as a journalist, inspired by the ideas he had acquired in France.

He married Carmen Bustamante, niece of pioneer Venezuelan physician Francisco Eugenio Bustamante and a descendant of General Rafael Urdaneta. The couple had six children, among them journalists Eduardo López Bustamante, Carlos López Bustamante and Teresa López Bustamante. Some years after his wife died, he married Carmen López Castro. They had two children.

He died at age 63 in Maracaibo, Venezuela, on 22 July 1913.

== Publications ==
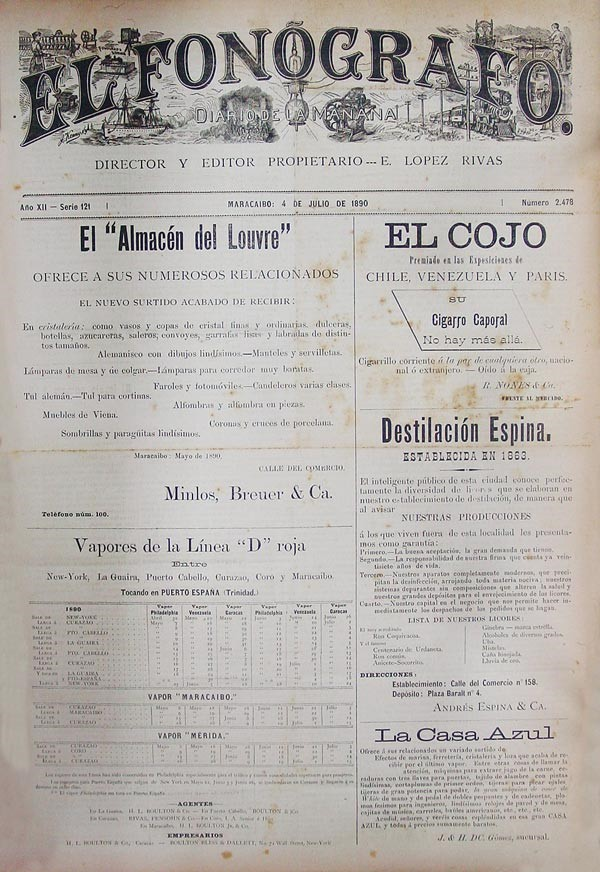
Diario El Fonógrafo (The Phonograph), newspaper founded by Eduardo lópez Rivas in 1879

Between 1873 and 1877 he started five different newspapers in Caracas, El Semanario (The Weekly), La Antorcha (The Torch), El Periódico (The Newspaper), El Mensajero (The Messenger) and El Boletín Mercantil (The Commercial Bulletin). These newspapers published articles about politics in open opposition to the Venezuelan president, Antonio Guzmán Blanco. They were closed down by the government, one after another. López Rivas was persecuted and imprisoned several times and he was forced to flee the country.

=== El Fonógrafo ===
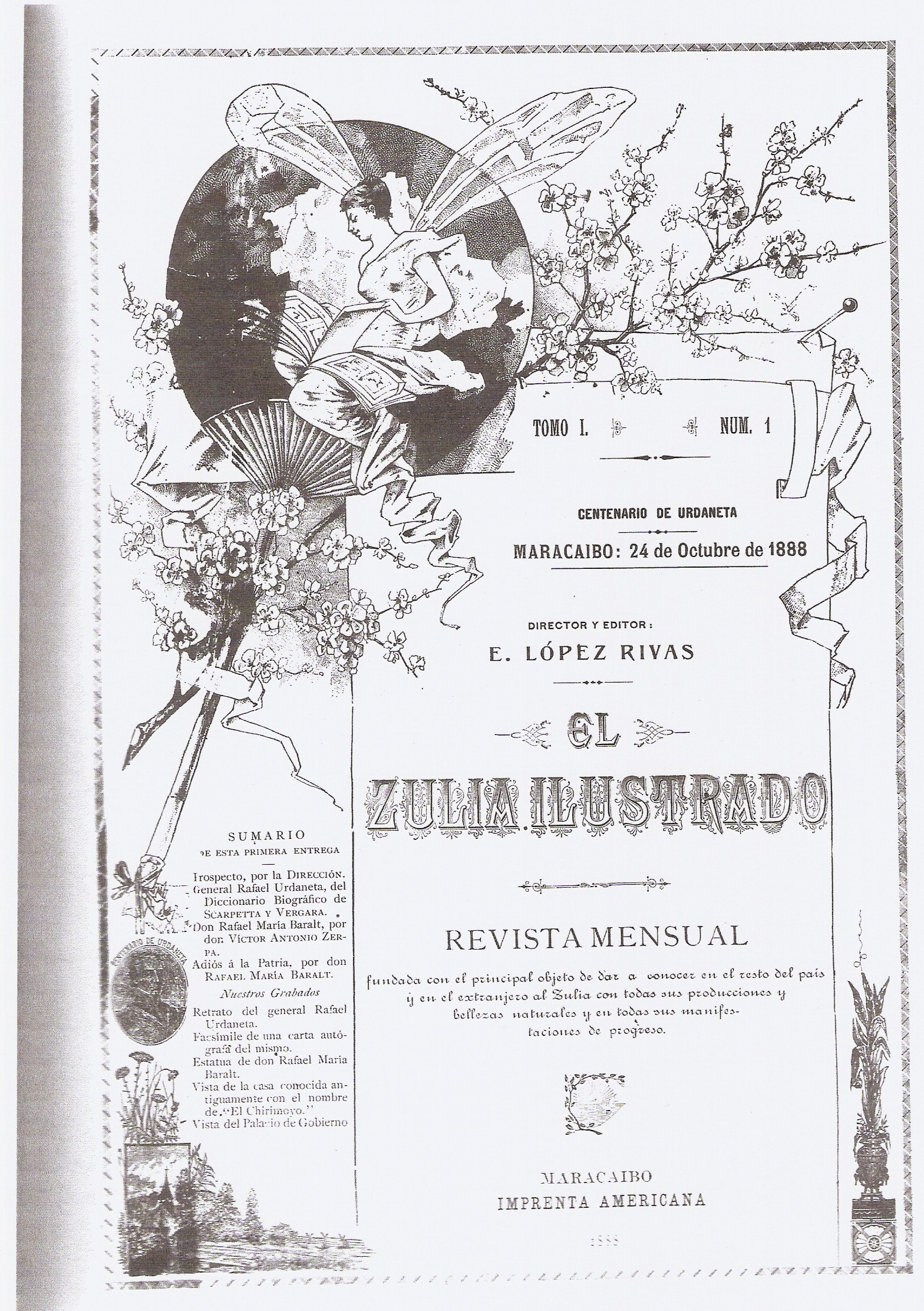
Cover of the magazine El Zulia ilustrado, founded by Eduardo López Rivas in 1888

In 1879 López Rivas returned to Venezuela and founded in Maracaibo El Fonógrafo (The Phonograph), a newspaper mainly aimed to defend social welfare. This newspaper was also closed down several times by the government, but its moral prestige made it possible for El Fonógrafo to restart, over and over, and to survive 38 years of censorship and dictatorship.

Eugene H. Plumacher, U.S. consul in Maracaibo between 1878 and 1919, mentions El Fonógrafo in his memoirs: "this newspaper was one of the best-run newspapers in Venezuela, modest and refined in its words but firm and serious in matters related to public welfare." Plumacher also writes about one of the many occasions when government troops entered the offices of El Fonógrafo and confiscated everything. "All the machinery of El Fonógrafo´s workshop was sent to the government office in Maracaibo, to edit a newspaper that supported President Antonio Guzmán Blanco".

Due to its support to the Allies during World War I, Venezuelan president Juan Vicente Gómez, a German Empire sympathizer, closed El Fonógrafo permanently on 23 August 1917.

=== El Zulia ilustrado ===
In October 1888 López Rivas began publishing a monthly magazine, El Zulia ilustrado (The illustrated Zulia). This magazine was dedicated to the history and culture of the State of Zulia.

It was the first Venezuelan magazine and the first periodical publication in the country with illustrations and photographs. It circulated inside and outside Venezuela and it had no commercial ads. Every issue included drawings of local heroes, country landscapes or battles of the Venezuelan independence, all made by López Rivas himself. The last El Zulia ilustrado was issued in December 1891.

== Imprenta Americana ==
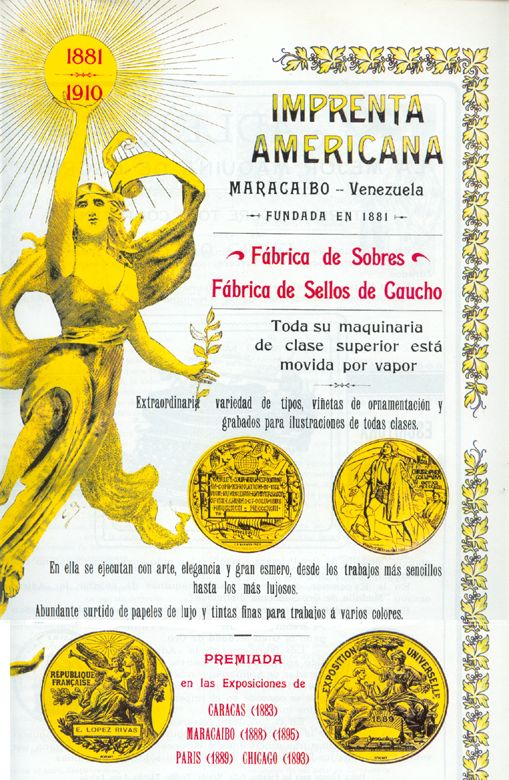
Ad of Imprenta Americana, Eduardo López Rivas editorial house

In 1881 Eduardo López Rivas created his own publishing house, Imprenta Americana (American Press). This publishing house printed the newspaper El Fonógrafo and the magazine El Zulia ilustrado, and it also edited books on a variety of subjects. It became a well known firm in Zulia State, with the most advanced techniques of the time.

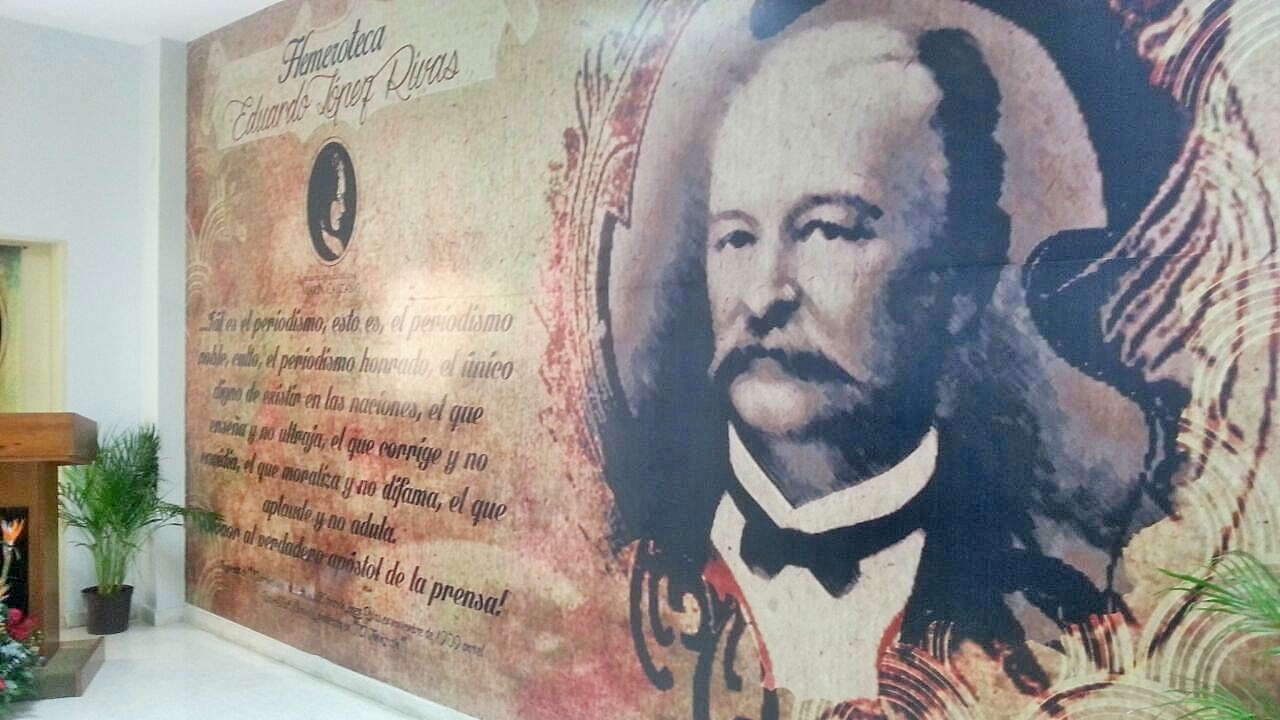
Maracaibo Public Press Library "Eduardo López Rivas"

It was in the headquarters of Imprenta Americana in Maracaibo where, for the first time in Venezuela, photographs and illustrations were printed in a periodical publication. It was also the first workshop in Venezuela to print illustrations mixing three different colors. This publishing house won several prizes in national and international fairs.

Imprenta Americana was closed down permanently by Venezuelan dictator Juan Vicente Gómez, on 23 August 1917.

== Legacy ==
Eduardo López Rivas is regarded in his country as a revolutionary of the press and the graphic arts, and his name is associated with freedom of speech and public spirit. The government of Zulia State has honored the editor's memory, by giving the name of Eduardo López Rivas and his publications to important places and events in that region of Venezuela.

- Municipal Journalism Award "Eduardo López Rivas:" This prize is awarded annually by the City Council of Maracaibo to the best journalistic work in defense of public welfare.
- El Zulia ilustrado Award: This prize is annually awarded by the Zulia State government to the best work in newspapers graphic arts.
- Eduardo López Rivas Library: Eduardo López Rivas is the name of the new Maracaibo Public Press Library, opened to the public in 2004.
- Pantheon of Zulia State: On 14 June 2012, the Board of Honors of the Pantheon of Zulia State, chaired by the governor of Zulia, approved the transfer of Eduardo López Rivas remains to the State Pantheon. The ceremony at the State Pantheon took place on 24 February 2015.
