= Humberto Fernández-Morán =

Venezuelan scientist (1924–1999)

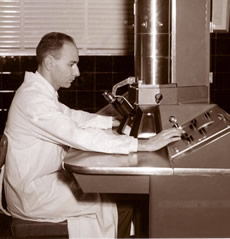
- Fernández-Morán Villalobos on the electron microscope at IVIC in the 1950s
- Born: Humberto Fernández-Morán Villalobos; 18 February 1924; Maracaibo, Venezuela
- Died: 17 March 1999 (aged 75); Stockholm, Sweden
- Education: Ludwig-Maximilians-Universität München; George Washington University
- Known for: Diamond knife Founder of IVIC; Cryoultramicrotomy; Electron cryomicroscopy
- Awards: Order of the Polar Star, John Scott Award
- Scientific career
- Fields: Medicine
- Workplaces: Central University of Venezuela (UCV), NASA, MIT, University of Chicago, Stockholm University

Humberto Fernández-Morán Villalobos (18 February 1924 – 17 March 1999) was a Venezuelan research scientist born in Maracaibo, Venezuela, known for inventing the diamond knife or scalpel, significantly advancing the development of electromagnetic lenses for electron microscopy based on superconducting technology, and many other scientific contributions.

== Career ==
Fernández-Morán founded the Venezuelan Institute for Neurological and Brain Studies, the predecessor of the current Venezuelan Institute for Scientific Research (IVIC). He studied medicine at the Ludwig-Maximilians-Universität München, where he graduated summa cum laude in 1944. He contributed to the development of the electron microscope and was the first person to use the concept of cryo-ultramicrotomy. After flying over Angel Falls in his home country of Venezuela he was inspired by the concept of the smoothly reoccurring flow system inherent in a waterfall, to take his diamond knife invention and combine it with an ultramicrotome to dramatically improve the ultra-thin sectioning of electron microscopy samples.

The ultramictrotome advances the rotating, drum-mounted specimen sample in such small increments (utilizing the very low thermal expansion coefficient of Invar) past the stationary diamond knife that sectioning thicknesses of several Angstrom units are possible. He also helped to advance the field of electron cryomicroscopy - the use of superconductive electromagnetic lenses cooled with liquid helium in electron microscopes to achieve the highest resolution possible - among many other research topics.

Fernández-Morán was commissioned in 1957 with the supervision of the first Venezuelan research nuclear reactor, the RV-1 nuclear reactor, one of the first in Latin America.

He was appointed Minister of Education during the last year of the regime of Marcos Pérez Jiménez. He was forced to leave Venezuela when the dictatorship was overthrown in 1958. He worked with NASA for the Apollo Project and taught in many universities, such as MIT, University of Chicago and the Stockholm University.

In 1986, he donated a collection of his papers to the National Library of Medicine.

== Personal life ==
His wife Anna was Swedish. They had two daughters, Brigida Elena and Verónica.

The body of Humberto Fernández-Morán was cremated. His ashes rest today in Cemetery The Square Luxburg-Carolath in his hometown, Maracaibo.

== Inventions ==
- Diamond knife
- Ultra microtome

== Awards and honors ==
- 1967, the John Scott Award, for his invention of the diamond scalpel.
- Knight of the Order of the Polar Star
- Claude Bernard Medal, University of Montreal
- Cambridge annual Medical Prize

== See also ==
- List of Venezuelans
