= El Zulia ilustrado =

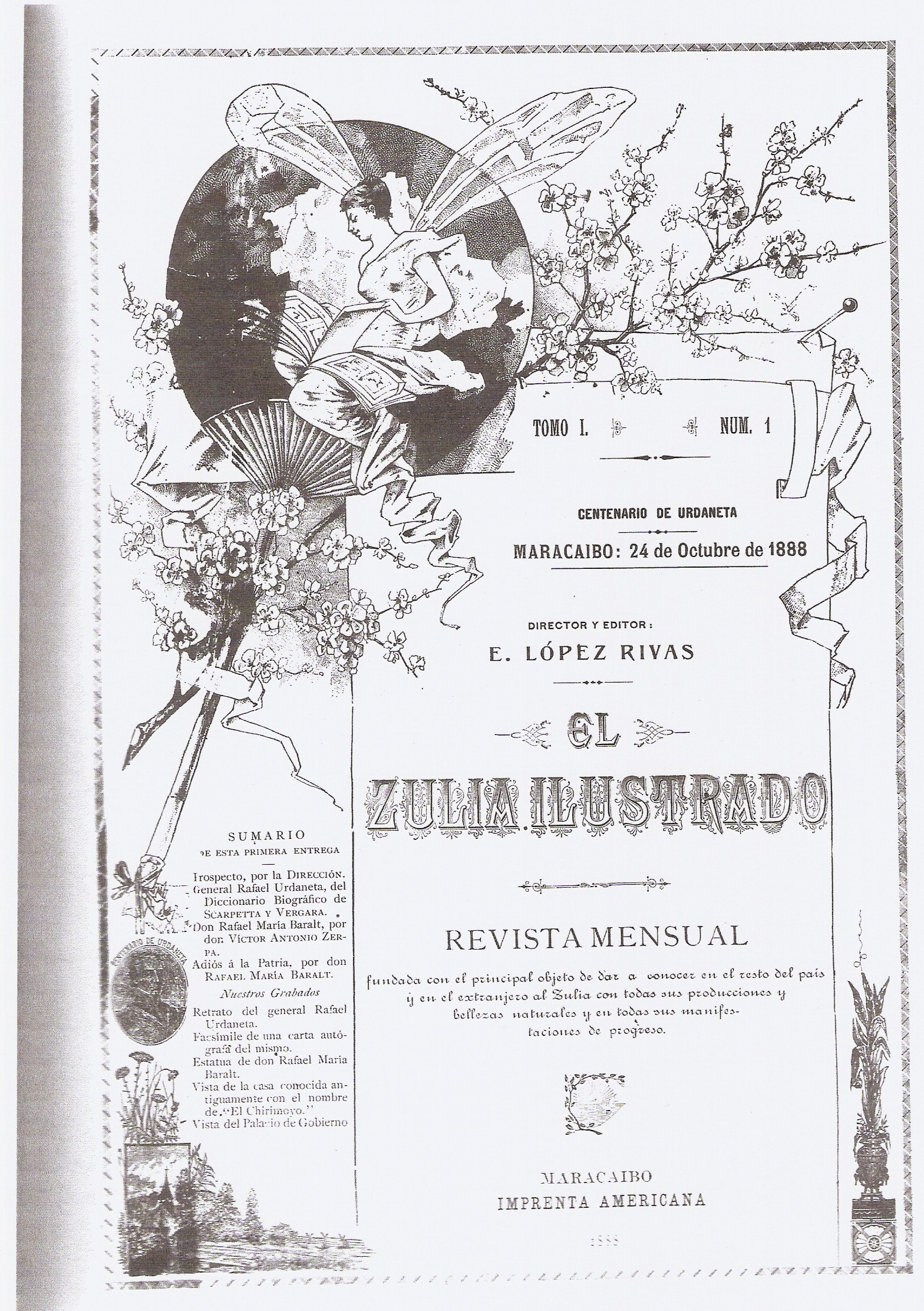
El Zulia ilustrado.

El Zulia Ilustrado (The illustrated Zulia) was the first Venezuelan magazine and one of the most prominent in Venezuela in the later 19th century. It was the first Venezuelan periodical that printed illustrations and photographs.

== History ==
El Zulia ilustrado was founded in Maracaibo by editor and journalist Eduardo López Rivas, who created the magazine to promote the state of Zulia. The first issue was published on October 24, 1888, on the occasion of the one hundredth anniversary of the birth of local hero Rafael Urdaneta

The magazine was edited in López Rivas own publishing house, Imprenta Americana (American Press) and it circulated inside and outside Venezuela. The last issue of El Zulia ilustrado was published in December 1891.

== Pioneer in pictures ==
El Zulia ilustrado has an important place in the history of the Press in Venezuela because it was the first Venezuelan magazine and the first periodical of the country that printed íllustrations and photographs.

It was an elegant monthly magazine, made on glossy paper. Every issue included drawings of a variety of subjects related to the history and culture of the Venezuelan state of Zulia. Drawings of local heroes, Zulia wildlife, views of the city of Maracaibo or countryside landscapes were all made by López Rivas himself, a professional artist educated in France.
