= José Rafael Pocaterra =

Venezuelan writer and diplomat

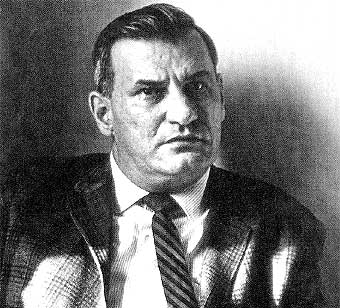

Minister of Communications
- In office 1939–1941
- President: Eleazar López Contreras
- Preceded by: Héctor Cuenca

Personal details
- Born: 18 December 1889 Valencia, Venezuela
- Died: 18 April 1955 (aged 65) Montreal, Canada
- Profession: Writer, journalist, politician

José Rafael Pocaterra (18 December 1889 – 18 April 1955) was a Venezuelan writer, journalist and politician.

== Career ==
He was imprisoned in 1907 to 1908 for his work on the opposition newspaper Caín, and again from 1919 to 1922 after participating in Luis Rafael Pimentel's attempt to overthrow the dictator Juan Vicente Gómez. Whilst in prison, where he was tortured, he wrote the history book Memorias de un venezolano de la decadencia (published in 1927) and the novel La casa de los Ábila (published 1946). Later he participated in Román Delgado Chalbaud's ill-fated 1929 Falke expedition aimed at over-throwing Juan Vicente Gómez. Under Eleazar López Contreras he was Minister of Communications (1939–1941), and then held a variety of ambassadorial posts (to the United Kingdom, the Soviet Union, Brazil, and the United States) until he resigned as Ambassador to Washington in 1950 following the assassination of Carlos Delgado Chalbaud.

He was a contributor to El Heraldo de Cuba, amongst other publications.

== Books ==
Novels

- Política feminista: o, El doctor Bebé (1910)
- Vidas oscuras (1912)
- Tierra del sol amada (1917)
- La casa de los Ábila (1946)

Other

- Memorias de un venezolano de la decadencia (1927, historical)
- Cuentos grotescos (1922, short stories)

Books by others

- Cartas a José Rafael Pocaterra (1889–1955) (2007, collection of letters to Pocaterra). Editorial El Perro y la Rana. ISBN 978-9803967406
- José Rafael Pocaterra (1889–1955) (2009, by Simón Alberto Consalvi). Editora El Nacional.

== See also ==
- Political prisoners in Venezuela
- Torture in Venezuela
