= Imprenta Americana =

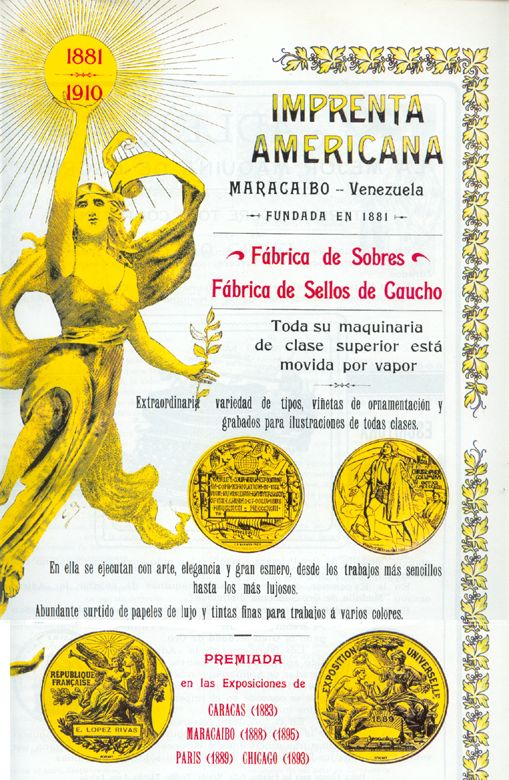
Imprenta Americana (American Press)."El Fonógrafo", 1910.

Imprenta Americana (American Press, 1881–1917) was the first publishing house that printed illustrations and photographs in Venezuelan periodicals. It was founded by editor and journalist Eduardo López Rivas, in Maracaibo, Venezuela, in 1881.

== Pioneer in pictures ==
López Rivas was the owner of the Venezuelan newspaper Diario El Fonógrafo (The Daily Phonograph) that was published by Imprenta Americana. He was also a professor of professional drawing, educated in France, and passionate about graphic arts.

In 1888 López Rivas started to publish a monthly magazine, El Zulia ilustrado (The Illustrated Zulia), dedicated to the history and culture of the Venezuelan state of Zulia. It was on the pages of this magazine, published by Imprenta Americana, that illustrations and photographs were printed for the first time in a Venezuelan periodical publication. Most of the illustrations were drawings of national heroes and country landscapes made by López Rivas himself.

Imprenta Americana had the most modern techniques of the time and it was the first workshop in Venezuela to print illustrations using a three-color system. This publishing house became a well known firm inside and outside Venezuela and it won many prizes in national and international fairs. López Rivas is considered "a true revolutionary of the Venezuelan graphic arts, a precursor and a sower".

== Raid and closure ==
When World War I started in 1914, the newspaper El Fonógrafo was published in the workshops of Imprenta Americana. Unlike other Venezuelan newspapers of the time El Fonógrafo sympathized with the Allies.

Venezuelan president Juan Vicente Gómez favored the German Empire in the conflict, while maintaining a veneer of neutrality against the allied community. Because of that he decided to put an end to El Fonógrafo and consequently to the publishing house.

On 23 August 1917, the headquarters of Imprenta Americana were raided by the government troops and they were closed down permanently.
