= Presidency of Isaías Medina Angarita =

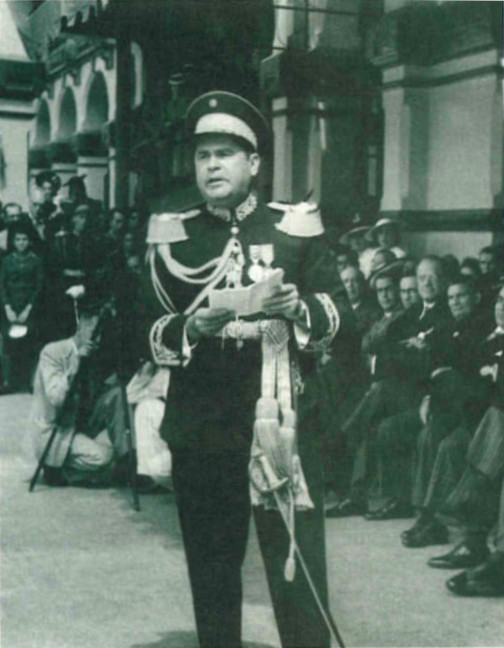
Isaías Medina Angarita

The presidency of Isaías Medina Angarita is considered a post-Gómez administration. Medina was elected by the Congress of the United States of Venezuela in 1941, having served as a minister and designated successor by outgoing president Eleazar López Contreras, and won the election by a clear margin. It was the fourth and final government of the period known as the Andean Hegemony, led by presidents born in Táchira.

By this time, Venezuela was the world's leading oil producer, a key factor during World War II.

At the legislative level, Medina's government legalized political parties across the entire political spectrum and sanctioned the 1945 constitution, which established municipal women's suffrage and the direct election of deputies. During this period, a new civil code was drafted. Medina founded the Venezuelan Democratic Party (PDV), organized by minister Arturo Uslar Pietri.

Medina's government presided over the latter part of World War II, during which Venezuela was attacked by Nazi Germany in the first Nazi incursion into the Americas. Medina's foreign policy included abandoning neutrality in 1945 and aligning with the Allies, establishing diplomatic relations with China (1943) and the Soviet Union (1945), while breaking relations with and successfully declaring war against the Axis powers.

Medina and López Contreras saw their relationship deteriorate during this time, as discourse began to refer to "Lopecismo" and "Medinismo." The government was overthrown by the 1945 coup d'état led by Rómulo Betancourt and Marcos Pérez Jiménez, self-styled as the "October Revolution". Medina Angarita was arrested and banished, going into exile in the United States. That year, the Jury of Civil and Administrative Responsibility was established to investigate corruption related to the Gómez and post-Gómez governments, including that of Medina.

== Background ==
Isaías Medina Angarita had served as private secretary to Eleazar López Contreras when the latter was minister of war and navy under dictator Juan Vicente Gómez. Subsequently, Medina served as minister of war under López Contreras after the latter assumed power following Gómez's death.

Several authors point out that Gómez had thought of Diógenes Escalante as his successor. According to writer Francisco Suniaga, Escalante was also López Contreras's first choice, but the military leadership forced him to choose a military officer instead.

Medina's rise signaled a decline for López Contreras, generating discord between the two.

== 1941 presidential campaign ==
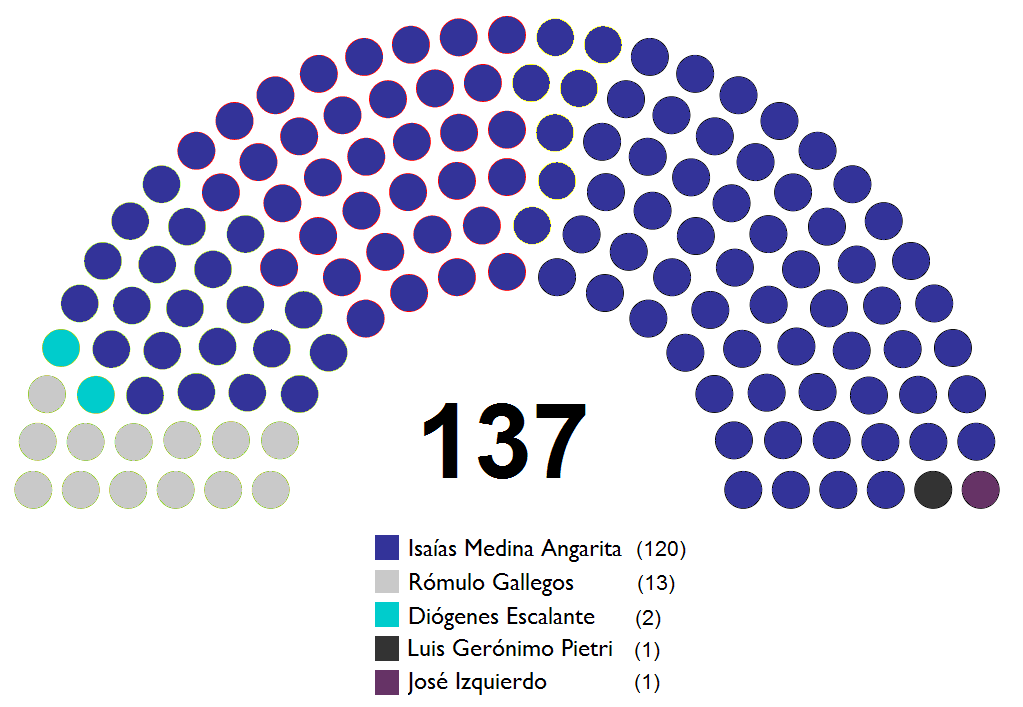
Results of the 1941 elections held by Congress

The 1941 election was the first presidential campaign in forty years. López Contreras's military government launched Minister Medina Angarita as its candidate. He competed against Rómulo Gallegos, Diógenes Escalante, Luis Gerónimo Pietri, and José Izquierdo. Medina Angarita won with 120 congressional votes out of a total of 137. President López Contreras's plan was to regain the presidency after Medina's term ended.

== Cabinet ==
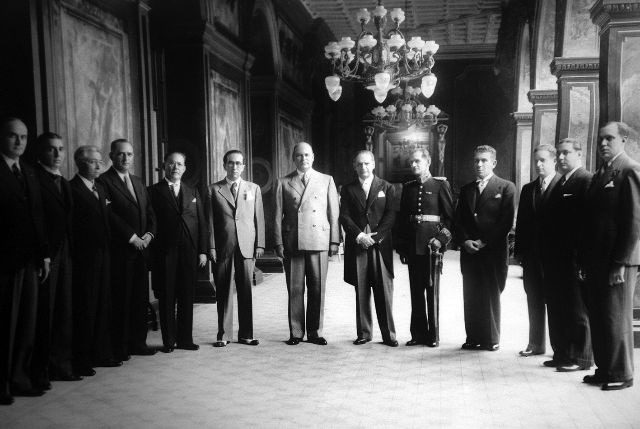
President Medina Angarita and his ministerial cabinet

Ministries
OFFICE	NAME	TERM
President	Isaías Medina Angarita	1941–1945
Home Affairs	Tulio Chiossone	1941–1942
Home Affairs	César González	1942–1943
Home Affairs	Juan Penzini Hernández	1943
Home Affairs	José Nicomedes Rivas	1943–1945
Home Affairs	Arturo Uslar Pietri	1945
Outer Relations	Caracciolo Parra Pérez	1941–1945
Outer Relations	Gustavo Herrera	1945
Finance	Alfredo Machado Hernández	1941–1943
Finance	Arturo Uslar Pietri	1943
Finance	Rodolfo Rojas	1943–1945
Finance	Alfonso Espinoza	1945
War and Navy	Antonio Chalbaud Cardona	1941–1942
War and Navy	Juan de Dios Celis Paredes	1942–1943
War and Navy	Carlos Meyer Baldo	1943
War and Navy	Manuel Morán	1943–1945
War and Navy	Delfín Becerra	1945
Development	Enrique Jorge Aguerrevere	1941–1942
Development	Eugenio Mendoza	1942–1943
Development	Gustavo Herrera	1943–1945
Development	Juan de Dios Celis Paredes	1945
Public Works	Manuel Silveira	1941–1945
Education	Alejandro Fuenmayor	1941
Education	Gustavo Herrera	1941–1943
Work and Communications	Numa Quevedo	1941
Work and Communications	Ovidio Pérez Ágreda	1941–1942
Work and Communications	Héctor Cuenca	1942–1943
Work and Communications	Julio Diez	1943–1945
Agriculture	Saverio Barbarito	1941
Agriculture	Rodolfo Rojas	1941–1943
Agriculture	Ángel Biaggini	1943–1945
Health and Social Assistance	Félix Lairet	1941–1945
Secretary of the Presidency	Arturo Uslar Pietri	1941–1943
Secretary of the Presidency	Ángel Biaggini	1943
Secretary of the Presidency	Arturo Uslar Pietri	1943
Secretary of the Presidency	Pedro Sotillo	1943–1945

== Domestic policy ==
=== Legislative policy ===
During Medina's government, the centralist 1945 constitution was promulgated, which removed the states' own judicial powers. A new Civil Code was also drafted.

=== Defense ===
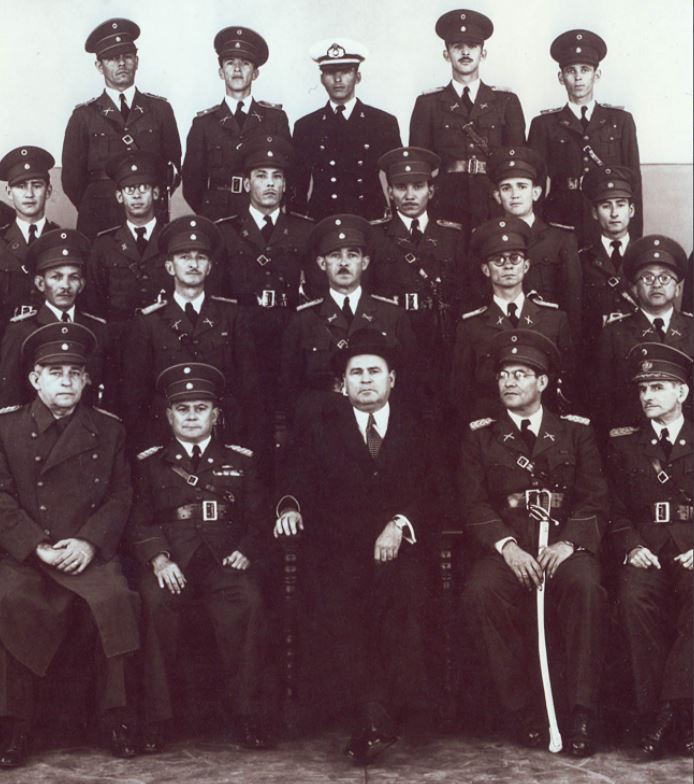
President Medina Angarita with a group of army officers, c. 1945

In 1943, the Military Service Law was reformed, establishing compulsory military instruction for the last two years of secondary education. In his message to Congress, Medina Angarita made reference to forced recruitment, noting that after the legal reform, the number of people enlisted by force had decreased. The president even stated that "the old sorrow and the old shame of forced recruitment have ended; this year, for the first time, there has been no forced recruitment in Venezuela."

=== Economics ===
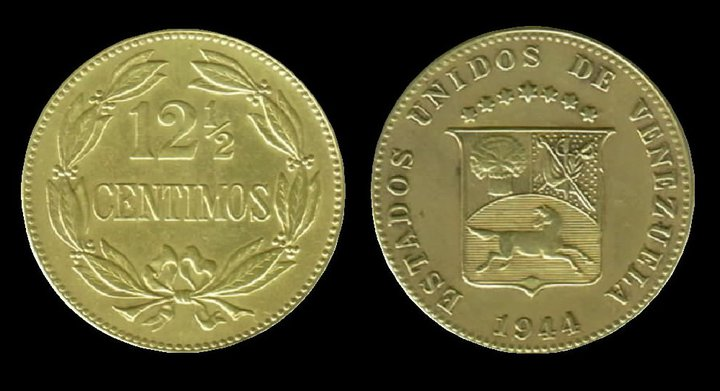
12.5‑cent coin of 1944

During Medina Angarita's government, it was decided to continue the economic policy of the López administration, outlined by minister Alberto Adriani, to diversify the country's economy "in its agricultural, livestock, mining, and industrial aspects, so that the nation's wealth would be solid and vigorous and not exposed to the serious and unpredictable contingencies that could normally affect a single product or a single activity," according to Medina. To achieve this, oil revenue would be utilized, but with state intervention.

The Junta de Fomento de la Producción Nacional, later called the Corporación Venezolana de Fomento, was created to grant credits aimed at fostering national production.

=== Energy ===
At that time, Venezuela was the world's leading oil producer. In 1943, the Hydrocarbons Law was sanctioned, increasing the Venezuelan state's participation to 50% and establishing that oil companies had to pay Income Tax. It was also decided that until the end of the war, oil would be refined in Venezuela. Additionally, concession contracts were limited to forty years, and beneficiary companies were required to build refineries in the country with the intention of developing the nation's industry. This law was well received in the United States and remained in force until it was replaced in 1976 during the nationalization of oil.

In 1941, oil production stood at 621,000 barrels per day, but after the Nazi attack of 1942, production was reduced to 400,000 barrels per day.

=== Electoral policy ===
==== Legalization of political parties ====
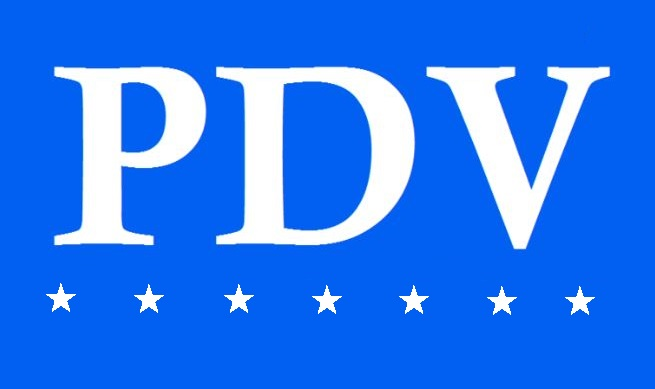
In 1943, the president founded his own party, the Venezuelan Democratic Party (PDV)

Medina Angarita allowed the establishment of political parties, which had been limited until then by the Gómez hegemony. On September 13, 1941, Democratic Action (AD) was founded. In 1942, National Action (precursor of COPEI) was founded. Medina Angarita himself founded a political party in 1943, the Venezuelan Democratic Party (PDV), organized by his minister Arturo Uslar Pietri. On October 9, 1945, clause 6 of article 32 of the National Constitution was eliminated to legalize the Communist Party (PCV), which was prohibited at that time, as was anarchism, which brought communist support to the government.

==== Partial women's suffrage ====
With the 1945 constitution in July of that year, Congress granted women the right to vote at the municipal level, the first form of women's suffrage in the country's history.

=== Infrastructure ===
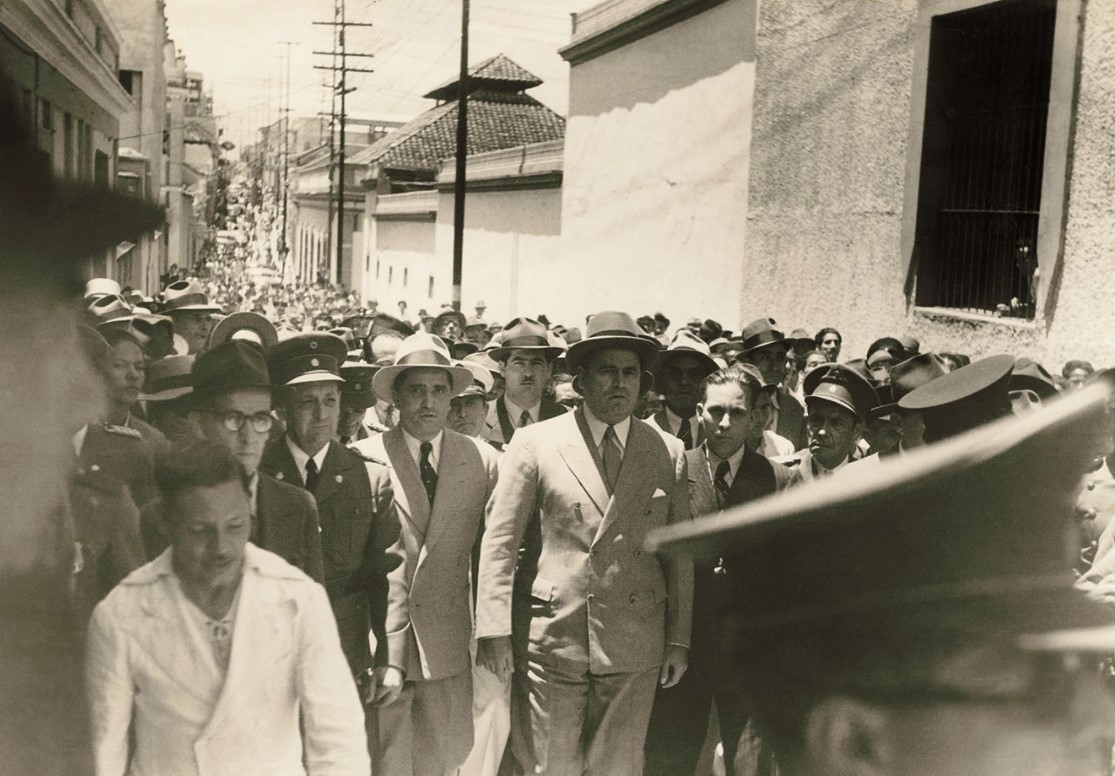
Medina Angarita, together with the Governor of the Federal District, Luis Gerónimo Pietri; the Minister of Public Works, Manuel Silveira; and the General Manager of the Workers' Bank, Diego Nucete Sardi, at the beginning of the demolition of the El Silencio properties, 1942

In 1943, the Ibarra Estate was expropriated for the purpose of building the University City of Caracas. The El Silencio Urbanization was also built.

=== Agriculture ===
In 1945, the Agrarian Reform Law was sanctioned.

=== Labor ===
President Medina Angarita not only allowed the existence of existing trade unions but also their proliferation. In 1940, the Compulsory Social Security Law was promulgated, along with the creation of the Central Institute of Social Security.

=== Social policy ===
In 1941, the Identification, Migration, and Immigration Service began operations, due to the need to regulate the identity of Venezuelans and register the entry of migrants into the country. Medina himself obtained identification card number 00001.

=== Human Rights ===
Despite the opening process, some repressive attitudes persisted on the part of the government. The dissolution of several trade unions was promoted, and during a labor conflict led by the Professional Union of Workers and Bus Drivers of the Federal District and Miranda State, its main instigators, Luis Miquilena and Jesús Vale, were detained.

Although a certain degree of freedom of expression was permitted, journalists José "Kotepa" Delgado, Raúl Domínguez, Alfredo Tarre Murzi, and Raúl Juan López were detained. These detentions provoked rejection from the Venezuelan Press Association (AVP), which influenced the subsequent release of those detained.

Within the framework of World War II, the government broke relations with the Axis powers, which subsequently led to the suspension of guarantees for foreign citizens from those countries.

== Foreign policy ==
=== World War II ===
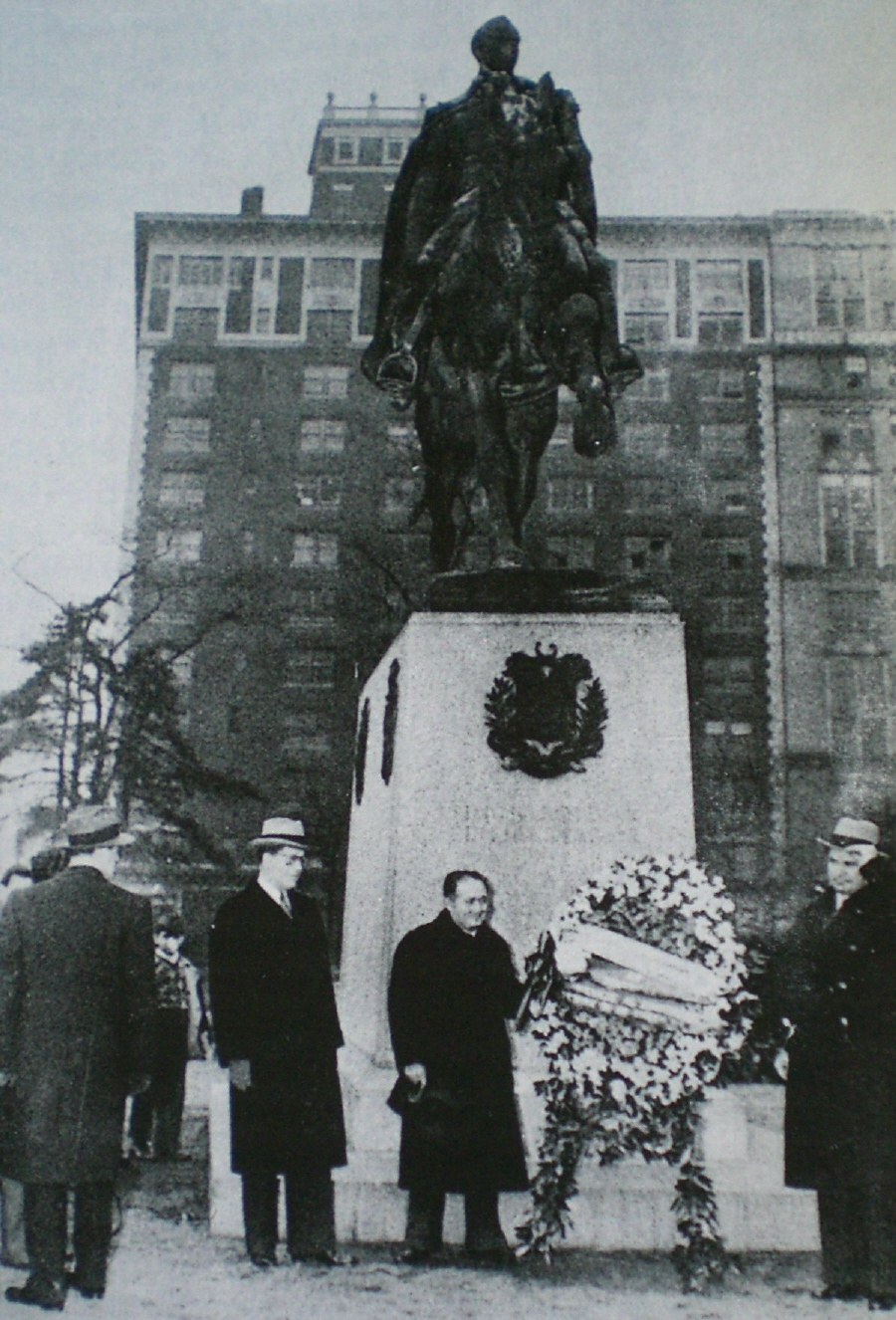
President Medina laying a floral offering before the Monument to Simón Bolívar in New York during his official visit to the United States.

The main chancellor was Caracciolo Parra Pérez. During World War II, Venezuela broke relations with the Axis powers, drawing closer to the Allied United Nations. In this context, Medina issued a decree suspending the guarantees of foreigners in Venezuela on January 21, 1942. On February 18, 1942, Venezuela suffered an attack when the Standard Oil refinery in Aruba was bombed.

On February 13, 1943, Venezuela adhered to the Atlantic Charter, the precursor to the United Nations.

Medina was the first president to make diplomatic trips abroad. In 1943, he traveled to the Bolivarian countries: Colombia, Ecuador, Peru, Bolivia, and Panama. In January 1944, he visited the United States as a guest of President Franklin D. Roosevelt. In New York, he awarded the Order of the Liberator to lawyer Severo Mallet-Prevost, who had been Venezuela's attorney in the territorial dispute over Esequibo. The ambassador to the United States, Diógenes Escalante, was chosen by Medina as his successor. In 1943, relations were established with China and, in 1945, with the Soviet Union.

==== Operation Neuland ====
Operation Neuland was the code name of the Kriegsmarine extension of unrestricted submarine warfare into the Caribbean Sea during World War II. German U-boats demonstrated range to disrupt British petroleum supplies and American aluminum supplies which had not been anticipated by Allied pre-war planning. Although the area remained vulnerable to submarines for several months, U-boats never again enjoyed the opportunities for success resulting from the surprise of this operation.

==== Sinking of the Monagas ====
Monagas was travelling unescorted and unarmed from Maracaibo, Venezuela to Aruba while carrying a cargo of oil products when on 16 February 1942 at 10.28 am, she was hit in the engine room aft on the port side by a G7e torpedo from the German submarine U-502 in the Gulf of Venezuela 12 nautical miles (22 km) west of Punta Macolla. The ship came to a standstill and only slightly settled in the water by the stern. Because she did not sink, the U-boat fired another torpedo at the ship 14 minutes after the first one as a coup de grâce, hitting her again aft on the port side underneath the funnel. This attack broke the ship's back which set her ablaze and made her develop a heavy list, but still did not sink her. The ship continued to burn for three days before sinking 4 nautical miles (7.4 km) north of Punta Espada, Guajira, Colombia. The attack and sinking killed five crewmembers with the 26 survivors being rescued by the Venezuelan gunboat ARV General Urdaneta, SS Rosalia and SS Ramona.

== Proposed 1946 election project ==
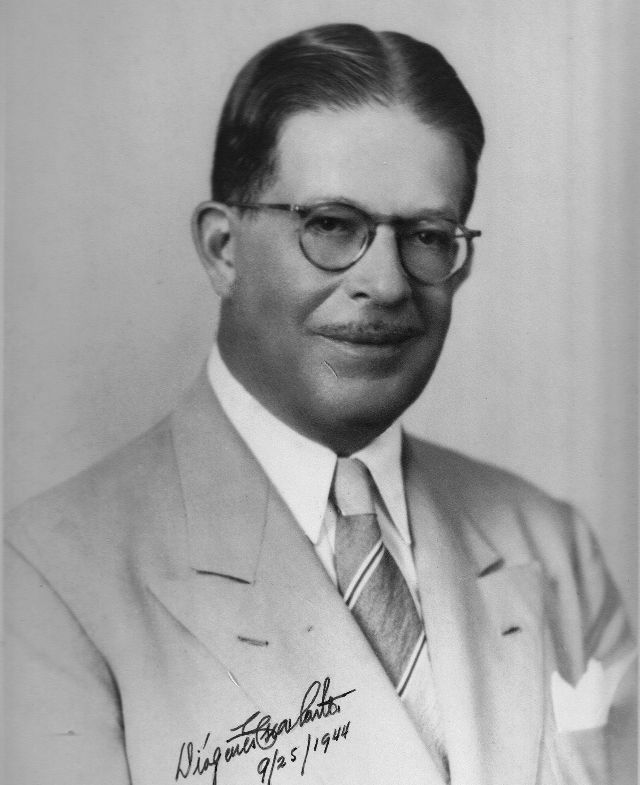
Diógenes Escalante

The proposed 1946 Venezuelan general election was to be held in Congress to indirectly elect the president of Venezuela. However, these were interrupted by the 1945 Venezuelan coup d'état.

The Venezuelan ambassador to the United States, Diógenes Escalante, was the favorite to succeed President Isaías Medina Angarita, accepting his candidacy in July 1945. However, by September it was announced that Escalante's mental health had deteriorated, leading the government to appoint a new candidate in October: Minister Ángel Biaggini. Nevertheless, shortly before the elections, the political parties failed to reach any agreement with guarantees to change the electoral system. Simón Alberto Consalvi related regarding the selection of Biaggini:

It was so surprising that, if you take the trouble to look at the official PDV newspaper, which was called El Tiempo, edited by (...) Picón Salas and Ramón Díaz Sánchez, you will see that this newspaper took two days to announce that Ángel Biaggini had been chosen as the presidential candidate of the republic, because the surprise was so great that no one could explain it.

Former president Eleazar López Contreras appeared close to achieving the presidency in the next elections.

== 1945 coup d'état ==
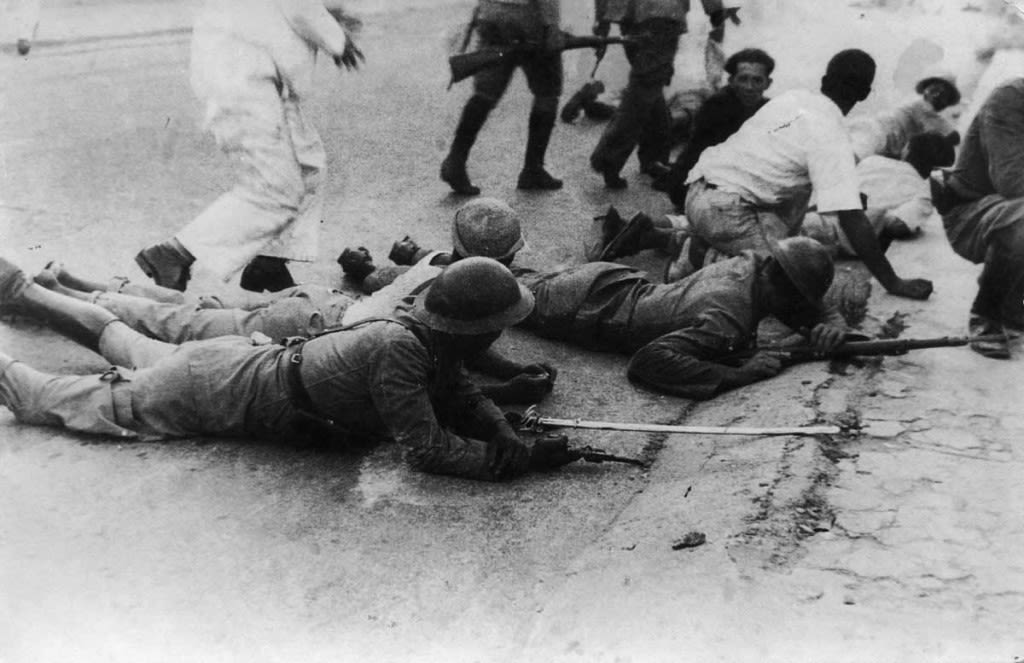
1945 coup d'état

Part of the army felt that gerontocracy prevailed in the state, and at the same time, despite the legalization of political parties, civil society had not seen its expectation of constitutionally restoring free and direct presidential elections fulfilled. Rómulo Betancourt and Marcos Pérez Jiménez led a civic-military coup d'état against President Medina Angarita. Medina suspended constitutional guarantees and ordered the arrest of Pérez Jiménez but was ultimately overthrown and went into exile. Subsequently, all the coup leaders would become presidents, beginning with Betancourt.

== See also ==
- Presidency of Eleazar López Contreras
- First presidency of Rómulo Betancourt
