= History of Venezuela (1908–1958) =

Historical period of Venezuela

Between 1908 and 1958, the Republic of Venezuela saw several changes in leadership, including a coup d'état in 1948. The period also found the country discover its petroleum deposits, which has had a major effect on the economy of Venezuela

== Juan Vicente Gómez (1908–1935) ==
In 1908, President Cipriano Castro was too sick to be cured in Venezuela and he left for Germany leaving Juan Vicente Gómez in charge. Castro had not gone further than the outer Antilles when Gómez took over the government and forbade Castro from returning. This was the beginning of a regime that lasted until 1935 and is interwoven with the early development of the oil industry - the history of Venezuela has been influenced by this event.

One of Gómez's first measures was to start canceling outstanding Venezuelan international debts, a goal which was soon achieved. Under Gómez, Venezuela acquired all the appurtenances of a regular national army staffed and officered almost entirely by Andeans. At the time, the country had a widespread telegraphic system. Under these circumstances, the possibility of caudillo uprisings was curtailed. The only armed threat against Gómez came from a disaffected former business partner to whom he had given a monopoly on all maritime and riverine commerce. Although there are many tales of Gómez's cruelty and ruthlessness, they are mostly exaggerations by his enemies. The man who had tried to overthrow him, Román Delgado Chalbaud, spent fourteen years in jail. He later claimed that he was in ball and chains during all that time, but he was released by Gómez. His son, Carlos Delgado Chalbaud, would later become president of Venezuela. When university students staged a street demonstration in 1928 (Generation of 1928), they were arrested but were soon released. But Gómez was indeed ruthless in throttling all opposition and he allowed a personality cult, but this was as much his doing as that of his sycophants, who were numerous all over Venezuela. Gómez, unlike Guzmán Blanco, never erected a statue of himself anywhere in Venezuela. He was a stickler for legal formalisms, which in essence meant that he introduced new constitutions any time it suited his political ends, although this was also the rule during the 19th century. During his dictatorship, Gómez appointed two figurehead presidents while he kept a tight hold on the armed forces from Maracay, his favorite city, west of Caracas, which he embellished and made the main Venezuelan garrison, a status which it retained until at least the 1960s.

=== The discovery of oil ===
It did not take much geological expertise to know that Venezuela had large petroleum deposits, because the petroleum oozed out from seeps all over the country and an asphalt lake had formed naturally. Venezuelans themselves had tried to extract oil for a small hand-pumped refinery early in the 20th century. When word spread internationally of Venezuela's oil potential, representatives of large foreign companies came to the country and started lobbying for rights of exploration and exploitation, and Gómez established the concessionary system. Venezuela had inherited from Spain the law that the ground surface—presumably, as deep as a plow or a water well went—could belong to individuals but everything under the soil was state property. Thus, Gómez began to grant huge concessions to family and friends. Any one who was close to Gómez eventually would become rich in one way or another. Gómez himself accumulated immense expanses of grasslands for cattle-raising, which had been his original occupation and was a lifelong passion. The Venezuelan concessionaires leased or sold their holdings to the highest foreign bidders. Gómez, who didn't trust industrial workers or unions, refused to allow the oil companies to build refineries on Venezuelan soil, so these were built them in the Dutch islands of Aruba and Curaçao. The one in Aruba was for a time the second largest in the world, after the one in Abadan, Iran. Although the Venezuelan oil boom started around 1918, the year when oil first figured as an export commodity, it took off when an oil well called Barroso blew a 200-foot (60 m) spout that threw up an average of the equivalent to 100,000 barrels a day. It took five days to bring the flow under control. By 1927, oil was Venezuela's most valuable export and by 1929 Venezuela exported more oil than any other country in the world.

It has been said that Gómez did not tax the oil companies and that Venezuela did not benefit from oil production, but this is only a half-truth. The Venezuelan government derived considerable income from the concessions and from taxes of one sort of another, but the original fiscal laws which applied to the oil companies were hammered out between the government and American lawyers. The laws were relatively lenient, but Gómez, who had an acute business sense, understood that it was necessary to create incentives for investors in the Venezuelan oil fields, some of which were very accessible but others were deep in jungles. Oil income allowed Gómez to expand Venezuela's rudimentary infrastructure and the overall impact of the oil industry on Venezuela was a modernizing trend in the areas where it operated. But in a wider sense, the Venezuelan people, except for those who worked for the oil companies and lived badly but had a steady income, benefited little or not all from the country's oil riches.

Gómez took power in a very poor illiterate country. The white/pardos social divide was still very much in place. When Gómez died in his bed in 1935, Venezuela was still a poor illiterate country and if anything the social stratification had been accentuated. The population had grown from perhaps one million and a half to two million. Malaria was the greatest killer. Gómez himself probably had Amerindian ancestry, but he was overtly racist and he was much influenced by a historian, Laureano Vallenilla Lanz, who published a book claiming not inaccurately that the Venezuelan War of Independence was really a civil war with the dubious added argument that pardos were a menace to public order and Venezuela could only subsist as a nation ruled by white strongmen. Gómez, for instance, prohibited all immigration from black Caribbean islands. Even though Venezuela's population in his time was 80% pardo, passports, which were first issued under Gómez, identified carriers by the color of skin, which they still did until the 1980s. Venezuela did change considerably under Gómez. It had radio stations in all the important cities. There existed an incipient middle class. But it still had only two or three universities. An estimated 90% of families formed through common-law marriages. The social progress that did take place was through a spontaneous trend towards modernization in which oil played the central role.

== López Contreras and Medina Angarita (1935–1945) ==
Gómez's minister of war, Eleazar López Contreras, succeeded him: a tall, thin, disciplined soldier with a solid education. Before arriving at his post, he served the Gomecista government loyally wherever he was sent, including at one time Venezuela's eastern land's end, a village called Cristobal Colón, across from Trinidad. In power, López Contreras allowed the pardo masses to vent for a few days before clamping down. He had Gómez's properties confiscated by the state, but the dictator's relatives, with some exceptions who left the country, were not harassed. Gómez never married but he had various illegitimate children. Initially, López Contreras permitted political parties to come into the open, but they tended to become rambunctious and he proscribed them, although he did not use strong repressive means (which weren't necessary anyway) as the politicians that led them, called in Venezuelan historiography the "1928 Generation", did not yet have large popular followings. One of the reasons for this hard stance was that, during his first year as president, López Contreras was faced with a labor strike which paralyzed the oil industry in Zulia state in western Venezuela, whose capital was Maracaibo, where the most productive fields were located.

López Contreras had created a labor ministry and his representative there, Carlos Ramírez MacGregor, received orders to make a report of the situation, which confirmed the workers’ grievances. He also had instructions to declare the strike illegal, (which he did). Government forces made the workers return to their jobs, although after that incident the oil companies did start taking serious initiatives to improve conditions for Venezuelan workers. Among the notable goals of López Contreras was a campaign to eradicate malaria in the llanos. This task was finally accomplished during the following presidency through the use of DDT.

Two communists led the oil strike: Rodolfo Quintero and the oil worker Jesús Faría. The history of Marxism in Venezuela is rather complex, but a brief overview is that communism never sunk roots in Venezuela and its impact on mainstream politics was minimal. López Contreras tried to create a political movement called Cruzadas Cívicas Bolivarianas (Civic Bolivarian Crusades), but it did not pan out, for whatever he did had the taint of his background as a pillar of the Gómez regime. Even the name "crusades" was suspect with its clerical overtones. Constitutionally, López Contreras finished Gómez's last term and in 1936 he was elected by the docile congress for the term ending in 1941.

After a vote in the same congress for the 1941–1946 term, López Contreras handed power to his war minister and personal friend, the Andean general Isaías Medina Angarita, who in many ways made a strong foil to his predecessor. He was stout and good natured and did not make excessive demands on himself. Medina Angarita legalized all political parties, including the divided communists: some were hard-line, such as the Machado brothers of a traditional Caracas family; and others, gradualists or conciliatory, led by Luis Miquilena, a union leader who supported Medina's step-by-step approach and for a time was allied to one of the Machado brothers. Under Medina there was an indirect democracy, which followed the 19th century custom of elections at the municipal council level. But Medina was committed to a still restricted but wider national democratic election. For that he had officialdom in all the Venezuelan states form a pro-government party named Partido Democratico Venezolana or PDV (Venezuelan Democratic Party). But the real genius at political organization was Rómulo Betancourt, who created from the bottom up what was in effect a pardo party with a strongly reformist, but not Marxist, agenda.

== El Trienio Adeco (1945–1948) ==
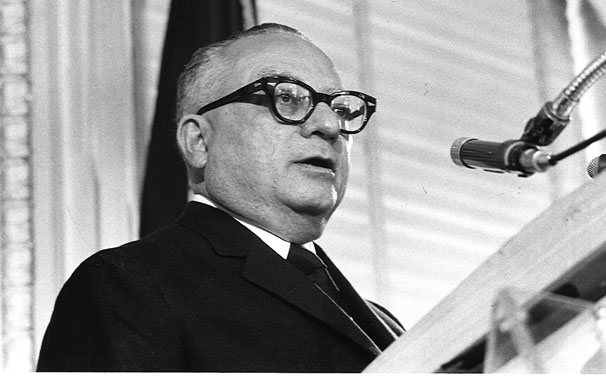
Rómulo Betancourt

El Trienio Adeco was a three-year period in Venezuelan history, from 1945 to 1948, under the government of the popular party Democratic Action (Accion Democratica, its adherents adecos). The party gained office via the 1945 Venezuelan coup d'état against President Isaías Medina Angarita, and held the first democratic elections in Venezuelan history. The 1947 Venezuelan general election saw Democratic Action formally elected to office, but it was removed from office shortly after in the 1948 Venezuelan coup d'état.

There was no particular incident that set off the bloodless 1948 coup, which was led by Delgado Chalbaud. There was no popular opposition. This might have meant that the odds were too great or that the pardo masses had not noticed any particular improvement in their lives despite the incessant government propaganda. All prominent adecos were expelled. The other parties were allowed but muzzled.

== 1948–1958 ==
Venezuela saw ten years of military dictatorship from 1948 to 1958. After the 1948 Venezuelan coup d'état brought an end a three-year experiment in democracy ("El Trienio Adeco"), a triumvirate of military personnel controlled the government until 1952, when it held presidential elections. These were free enough to produce results unacceptable to the government, leading them to be falsified, and to one of the three leaders, Marcos Pérez Jiménez, assuming the Presidency. His government was brought to an end by the 1958 Venezuelan coup d'état which saw the advent of democracy.
