= Carlos Ramírez MacGregor =

Venezuelan lawyer, politician, newspaperman, and diplomat

Carlos Ramírez MacGregor (3 March 1903 in Maracaibo, Zulia state – 15 March 1975 in Caracas) was a Venezuelan lawyer, politician, newspaperman, and diplomat. He obtained a doctorate in law at the University of Madrid, Spain.

When he returned to his country, Venezuela was still being ruled by the dictator Juan Vicente Gómez. When Gomez died, he was named labor inspector for Zulia state, center of the oil industry, by the government of Eleazar López Contreras. As such, he prepared a report on working conditions that was influential in the substantial betterment of workers' living conditions by the government and the oil companies.

He was congressman seven times spanning a period of over three decades. During his first nomination to Congress, he distinguished himself by defending the economic interests of his state at the time when imports from the USA were restricted because of World War II.

Together with politicians such as Alfredo Tarre Murzi and Arturo Uslar Pietri, he was one of the founders of the Venezuelan Democratic Party (Partido Democratico Venezolano, PDV), created to support the administration of president Isaias Medina Angarita. When this government was overthrown in the Revolution of October 1945, Ramírez MacGregor was briefly jailed by the junta, formed by Accion Democratica party (AD) and military officers, that ruled the country until 1948.

In 1949, Ramírez MacGregor became director of the Maracaibo daily Panorama, a position he held until 1965. He was honored in 1953 with the Maria Moors Cabot prize for Latin American journalists sponsored by Columbia University, New York. He also directed the Caracas weekly Momento from 1958 to 1973. In both positions he was a prolific writer of articles on social and political issues. He opposed the dictatorship of Gen. Marcos Pérez Jiménez and he exiled himself starting in 1955.

When democracy was restored to Venezuela in 1958, Ramírez MacGregor returned to politics, but finally resigned to active participation when he refused to back the candidacy of the AD leader Carlos Andrés Pérez. Ramírez MacGregor was ambassador to Belgium, México, Italy, and the UN organisms in Geneva.

Ramírez MacGregor wrote Aspectos de nuestro problema obrero (1937), on labor issues, and Reglamentación del trabajo en el campo (1940), in which he was pioneer advocate of extending labor legislation to farm workers.
