= Gustavo Herrera =

Gustavo Herrera may refer to:

- Gustavo Herrera (politician) (1890–1953), Venezuelan politician, diplomat and lawyer
- Gustavo Herrera (footballer) (born 2005), Panamanian footballer
