= 1941 Venezuelan presidential election =

- 28 April 1941
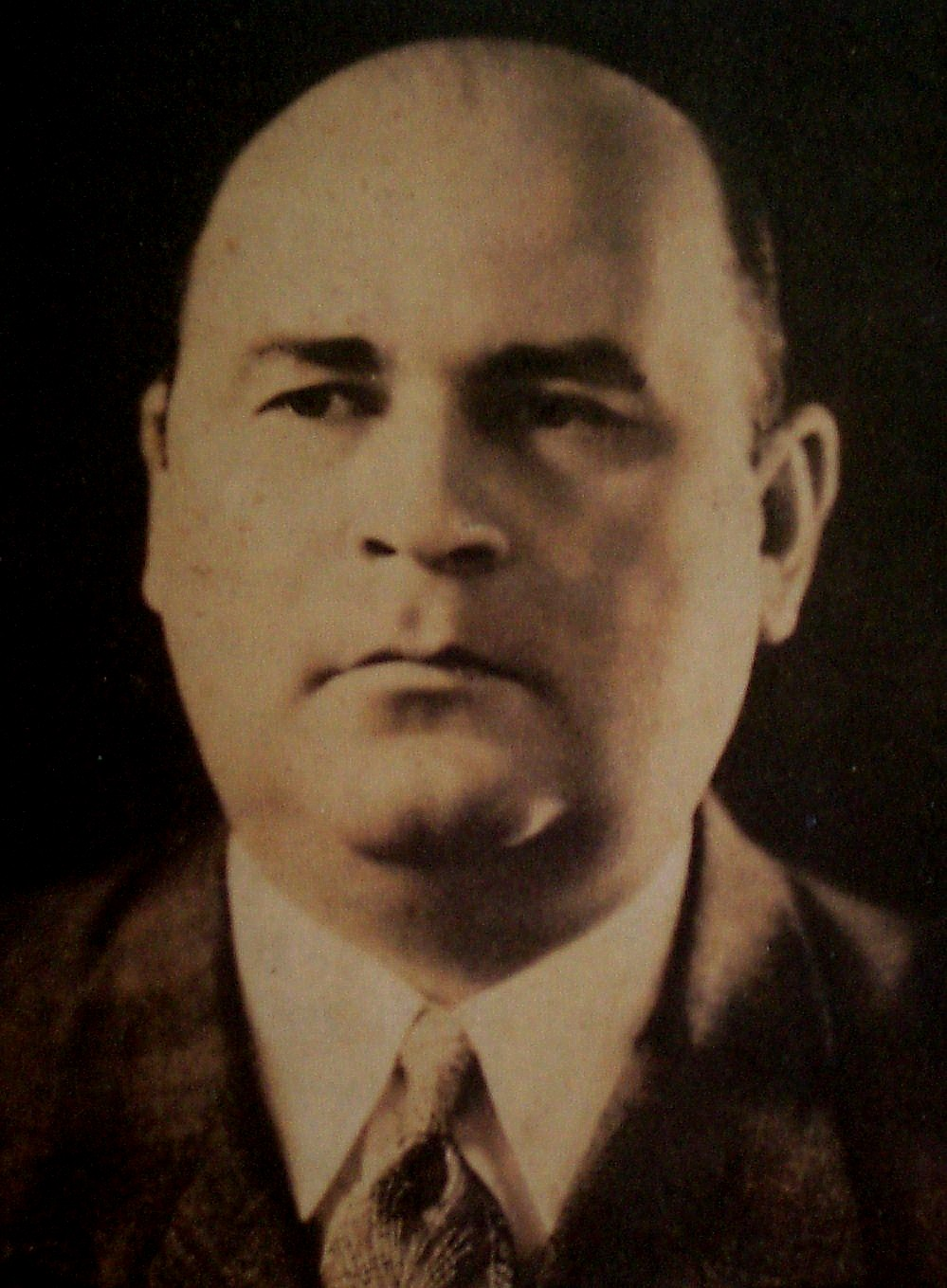

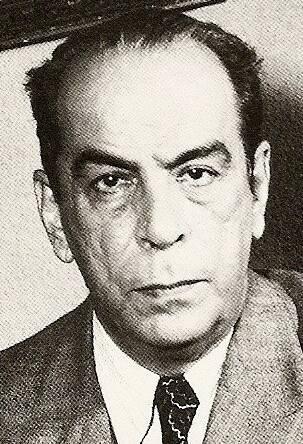
Nominee	Isaías Medina Angarita	Rómulo Gallegos
Party	Venezuelan Democratic	Democratic Action
Electoral vote	120	13
Percentage	87.59%	9.49%
President before election
Eleazar López Contreras
Independent
Elected President
Isaías Medina Angarita
PDV

Presidential elections were held in Venezuela on 28 April 1941 to elect the successor of President of Venezuela Eleazar López Contreras. This presidential election, unlike the elections held since 1947, was indirect, that is, the voters were the deputies and senators of the Congress of Venezuela. The winner on this day was Isaías Medina Angarita with 120 votes, 87.6% of the seats in the Congress.

== Background ==
Following the death of President Juan Vicente Gómez, who was dictator of Venezuela from 1908 to 1935, General and Minister of Army and Navy Eleazar López Contreras assumed the presidency. Eleazar López Contreras attempted to mediate between the authoritarian processes of his predecessor, promoting democratic processes and political freedom for Venezuelans.

In July 1936 shortly after becoming President of Venezuela, President Eleazar López Contreras created a constitutional amendment limiting the presidential term from seven years down to five, applying this law upon himself as well. This constitutional decision led to the 1941 elections, where the Congress of Venezuela would determine the new President of Venezuela.

== Results ==
Candidate	Votes	%
Isaías Medina Angarita	120	87.59
Rómulo Gallegos	13	9.49
Diógenes Escalante	2	1.46
Luis Gerónimo Pietri	1	0.73
José Izquierdo	1	0.73
Total	137	100.00
Source: Events
