= First presidency of Rómulo Betancourt =

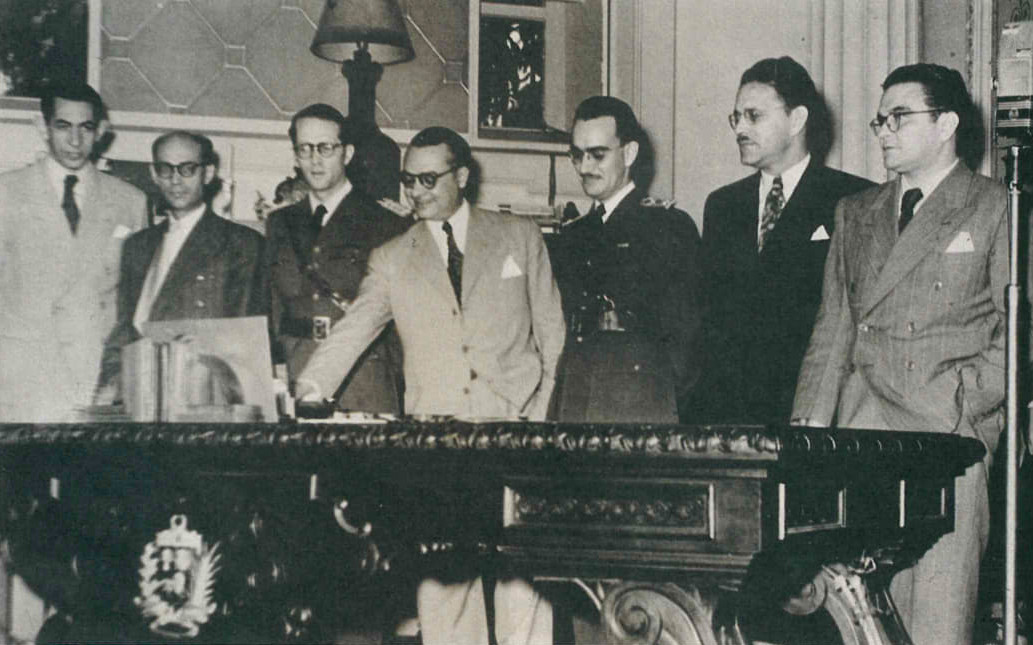
Revolutionary Government Junta

The Revolutionary Government Junta, also referred to as the first government of Rómulo Betancourt (1945–1948), was a de facto government of Venezuela, the first of the two governments of the Trienio Adeco, succeeding the government of Isaías Medina Angarita after the coup d'état self-styled as the October Revolution, organized by Democratic Action (AD) together with Marcos Pérez Jiménez, Carlos Delgado Chalbaud, and Mario Ricardo Vargas. The Junta was composed of five civilians and two military officers.

At the legislative and electoral level, elections were called for the Constituent Assembly of 1946, in which AD obtained an absolute majority. That Assembly ratified the Junta and promoted the 1947 constitution, which legalized full women's suffrage, and managed the first elections in which women voted for president. The leaders of the Junta prohibited themselves from running for any office in the elections they organized.

The Junta's judicial policy included the arrests and exiles of former presidents Isaías Medina Angarita (along with a large part of his cabinet) and Eleazar López Contreras, as well as the establishment of a Jury of Civil and Administrative Responsibility to evaluate corruption during the Gómez, López, and Medina administrations. In turn, the police were restructured and converted into the Dirección de Seguridad Nacional.

Energy policy saw the halting of oil concessions and a profit‑sharing agreement with foreign companies known as the "Fifty‑fifty". After his electoral victory, Rómulo Betancourt handed over power to his party colleague, Rómulo Gallegos. Betancourt later led a constitutional government between 1959 and 1964.

== Background ==
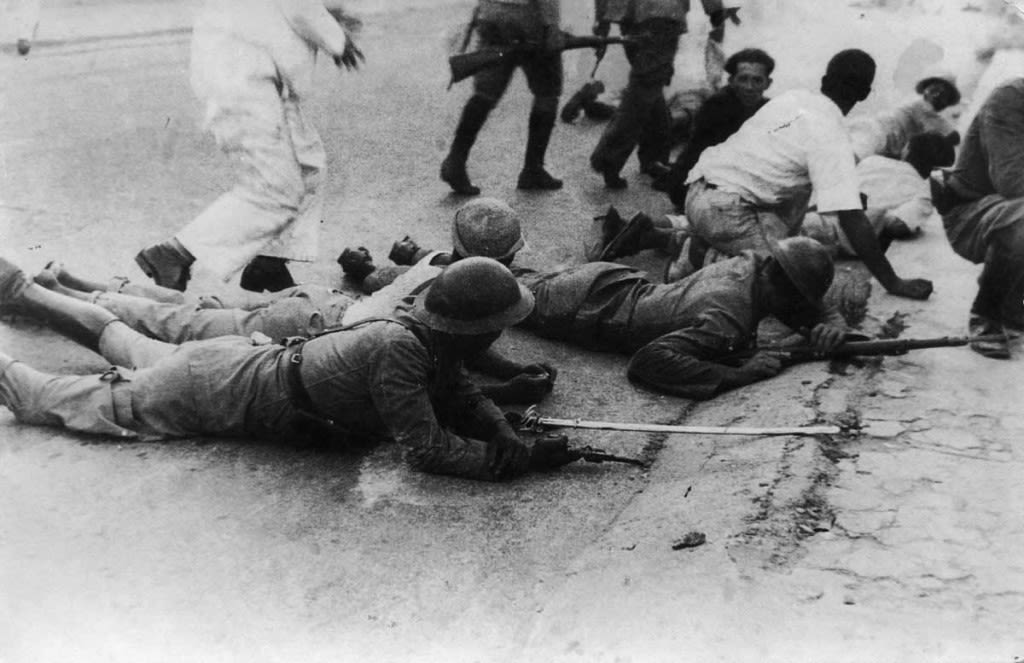
Confrontation during the 1945 coup d'état

In 1945, the opposition led by Rómulo Betancourt reached an agreement with the elected successor of President Isaías Medina Angarita, Diógenes Escalante, to legalize direct voting for presidential elections, but Escalante's mental health deteriorated upon returning to Venezuela, so he was ruled out for the presidency.

Betancourt had a conversation with President Medina to reach a consensus candidate other than Escalante's substitute, Ángel Biaggini, proposing Óscar Augusto Machado to call "direct elections for the choice of a head of state within one year of government," which was rejected by Medina. Without government backing for the legalization of direct voting, on October 13 of that year, AD called for abstention in the upcoming presidential elections.

Parallel to that and in secret, the Military Patriotic Union (represented by Marcos Pérez Jiménez, Francisco Gutiérrez, and Horacio López Conde) and AD leaders (represented by Betancourt and Raúl Leoni) conspired to carry out the 1945 coup d'état, in which the military proposed forming a government presided over by Betancourt.

Betancourt wrote regarding the coup:

The de facto government was born of a typical coup d'état… but whatever its origin, the truth is that we were animated by the undecidable decision that the provisional government would give the country the revolutionary turn it urgently demanded.

== Cabinet (1945–1948) ==
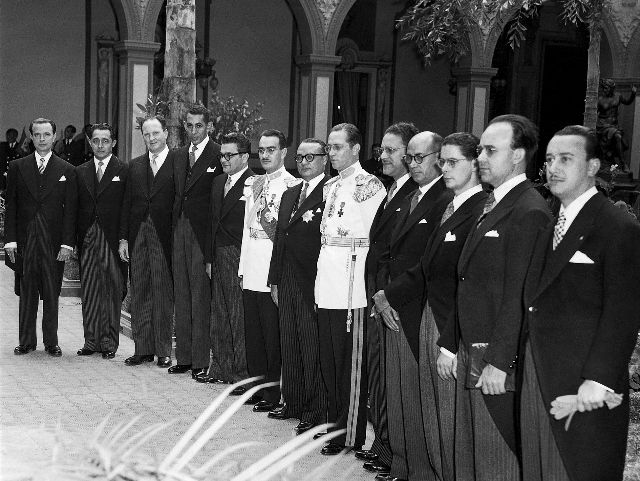
Cabinet of the Revolutionary Government Junta

Ministries
OFFICE	NAME	TERM
President	Rómulo Betancourt	1945–1948
Home Affairs	Valmore Rodríguez	1945–1946
Home Affairs	Mario Ricardo Vargas	1946–1948
Foreign Relations	Carlos Morales	1945–1947
Foreign Relations	Gonzalo Barrios	1947–1948
Finance	Carlos D'Ascoli	1945–1947
Finance	Manuel Pérez Guerrero	1947–1948
Defense	Carlos Delgado Chalbaud	1945–1948
Development	Juan Pablo Pérez Alfonso	1945–1948
Public Works	Luis Lander	1945–1946
Public Works	Eduardo Mier y Terán	1946–1947
Public Works	Edgar Pardo Stolk	1947–1948
Education	Humberto García Arocha	1945–1946
Education	Antonio Anzola Carrillo	1946–1947
Education	Luis Beltrán Prieto Figueroa	1947–1948
Labor	Raúl Leoni	1945–1948
Communications	Mario Ricardo Vargas	1945–1946
Communications	Valmore Rodríguez	1946–1947
Communications	Antonio Martín Araujo	1947–1948
Agriculture	Eduardo Mendoza Goiticoa	1945–1947
Agriculture	Ricardo Montilla	1947–1948
Health and Social Assistance	Edmundo Fernández	1945–1948
Secretary of the Junta	Luis Beltrán Prieto Figueroa	1945–1947
Secretary of the Junta	José Giacopini Zárraga	1947–1948

== Domestic policy ==
=== Legislative policy ===
1946 Constituent Assembly of Venezuela. In gray, the ruling party Democratic Action

The Junta decreed full guarantees for political parties in 1945, and called a Constituent Assembly the following year; according to the Venezuelan Electoral Observatory: "The press described the election of October 27, 1946, as the first absolutely clean elections in national history, without any incident, with order and tranquility." In those elections, women were elected as constituent representatives for the first time, with Ana Luisa Llovera elected as principal and eleven other candidates elected as alternates. The Constituent Assembly ratified the Revolutionary Junta for the executive mandate until the next presidential elections.

After the Constituent Assembly, a new constitution was sanctioned in 1947 granting full female suffrage. Rómulo Betancourt described his first government as becoming a "decree‑making machine."

=== Judicial policy ===
After the 1945 coup d'état, almost all of Isaías Medina Angarita's cabinet was placed under arrest, together with former president Eleazar López Contreras and some state presidents (governors) until November 30 of that year; the two presidents and 14 additional officials, including former minister Arturo Uslar Pietri, were exiled to Miami. The president of the Supreme Court of Justice, Antonio Pulido Villafañe, was imprisoned.

==== Jury of Civil and Administrative Responsibility ====
The Jury of Civil and Administrative Responsibility was a set of ad hoc trials established by the Revolutionary Government Junta of Venezuela on November 27, 1945, during the period known as the Trienio Adeco, charged with establishing responsibility for alleged embezzlement by Gómez‑era, López‑era, Medina‑era officials, and associates in previous administrations. The Jury examined a total of 108 files and issued judgments restoring assets to the national patrimony totaling Bs. 124,000,000.

Approximately 120 people from the three Gómez and post‑Gómez governments were tried. The process was controversial, and the Solicitor General of the Republic, Rafael Caldera, resigned because of it.

=== Defense ===
During the first months of government, the Revolutionary Government Junta established the Nautical School. A new constitution was approved in 1947, which maintained compulsory military service but prohibited forced recruitment in article 30.

=== Energy ===
In 1945, the "Fifty‑fifty" policy was agreed, under which profits from foreign companies and the Venezuelan state would be split 50%, also halting oil concessions. It is estimated that between 1945 and 1947, oil fiscal revenues rose from 581 million bolívars in 1945 to 952 million in 1946, and to 1,315 million in 1947.

=== Economics ===
Betancourt stated that at that time they were convinced that Venezuela "cannot skip the stage of capitalist development of its economy," so he assured that what was being developed "is more akin to the democratic‑bourgeois revolution than to the socialist revolution."

The National Economic Council and the Venezuelan Development Corporation (CVF) were created, the latter in May 1946. The Venezuelan Development Corporation was set up to boost agricultural production, improve old industries and develop new ones. The food deficit problem in Venezuela was tackled first, with interested corporate producers and individual farmers made 20-year loans at 4% interest to buy fertilizer, machinery and seed incidental (as noted by one study) “to expanding the production of maize, rice, beans, and sugar.” Credits were also extended to milk producers, and also for the purposes of combating diseases and insect pests, drilling water wells, and importing new breeds.

The Basic Economy Corporation was also created with capital contributions from Standard Oil of New Jersey and its Venezuelan subsidiary, the Creole Petroleum Corporation.

=== Security ===
The Revolutionary Government Junta reorganized the police, creating the Dirección de Seguridad Nacional in August 1946.

=== Electoral policy ===
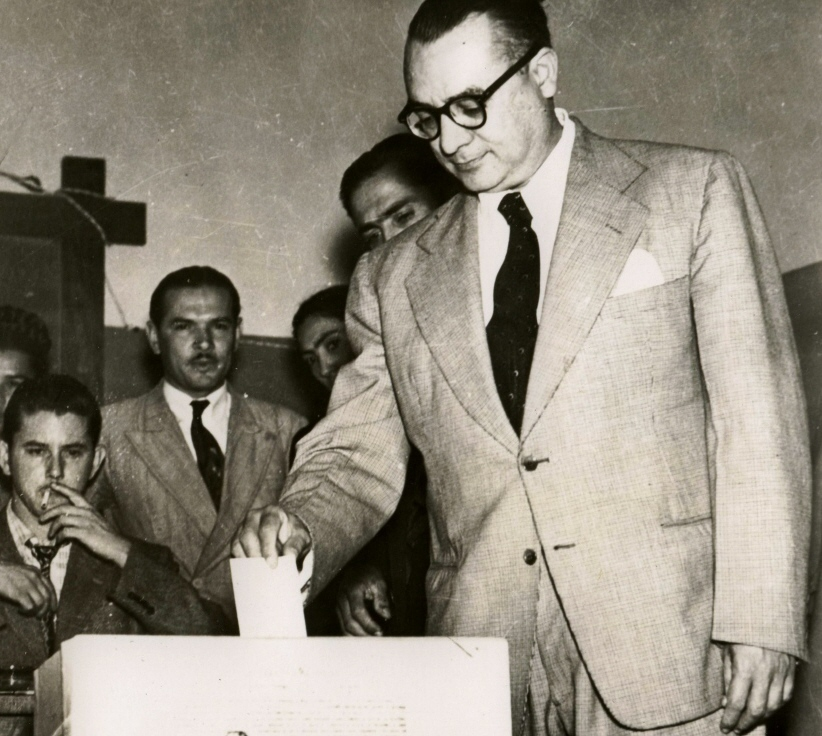
Rómulo Betancourt voting for the 1946 Constituent Assembly

After its installation, the Revolutionary Government Junta promised respect for all parties, including the National Democratic Party of Isaías Medina, swearing not to have privileges as the ruling party in the upcoming elections.

The members of the Revolutionary Junta disqualified themselves from running as constituent deputies or as president.

On March 15, 1946, the Junta approved Decree 217, which enacted the Electoral Statute that guaranteed "the right to vote for all Venezuelans over eighteen years of age." That year, elections for the 1946 Constituent Assembly were held, in which 92% of registered voters voted and AD won the majority, with 137 deputies (1,099,000 votes).

In 1947, the first secret and direct presidential elections since 1897 were held, and the first under universal suffrage, in which writer Rómulo Gallegos was elected president for AD.

=== Labor ===
A separate Ministry of Labor was set up, while the government encouraged the growth of trade unions and helped end a dispute in the petroleum industry to the benefit of the workers. The intervention of the AD labor minister (who got union and company officials to agree to negotiate) led to the signing in June 1946 of a 18-month collective contract that regulated working conditions in the entire petroleum industry. This agreement included extra hospital benefits, special compensation for night work, payment for a weekly rest day and for travel time, and large wage rises. When this contact expired at the end of 1947 the AD junta guided discussions towards an agreement to new three-year collective contract which (as noted by one study) “embodied extensive additional gains for the worker.”

On November 30, 1945, it was decreed that the salary of the president and his ministers would be 4,000 bolívars. The Labor Law was reformed. Salaries of all public officials were reduced, and their Christmas bonuses were eliminated. According to Betancourt, between 1945 and 1947, 740 unions had registered with the Ministry of Labor.

From 1945 to 1948, average real wages went up by 65.%

=== Transport ===
The Revolutionary Government Junta founded the National Railways Institute and reduced domestic airfare prices.

=== Education ===
Major efforts were undertaken to tackle educational deficiencies in Venezuela; with more than 50% of adults illiterate and only a third of children attending class. The education budget was trebled while the number of teachers and schools increased, resulting in secondary and university enrolments more than doubling and primary school enrolment more than trebling. To tackle illiteracy, hundreds of reading and writing centers were set up where over 30,000 adults were enrolled by 1948.

The Revolutionary Government Junta also reopened the University of Zulia (LUZ), which had been closed since 1904 by the dictatorship of Cipriano Castro. In mid‑1946, Minister Luis Beltrán Prieto Figueroa promoted Decree‑Law 321 on Grading, Promotions and Examinations in Primary Education, Secondary Education and Teacher Training, an official document that influenced the grading, promotion and examination system in primary and secondary education, which led to a confrontation between the government and the Catholic Church, the main provider of private education in the country, culminating in the abolition of the decree through Decree 344, which was supported by AD and the PCV but rejected by Copei and URD.

=== Health ===
A ten-year programme designed to tackle health problems throughout the country was launched, which led to the Ministry of Health’s budget being quadrupled and doctors being sent into the interior to provide medical care to previously ignored individuals. Sanitary engineering programmes (such a waterworks and sewers) received high priority to tackle the most deadly diseases; those related to the intestines. An anti-malaria campaign was carried out that within two years had conquered the scourge. New hospitals were also built while better hospital equipment was provided, and state-sponsored training of more laboratory technicians, nurses and doctors was carried out. Housing was also given priority, with thousands of modern masonry units built in the countryside while shanty-town sections of major cities started to get replaced by large multiple dwellings.

=== Infrastructure ===
By 1947, 71 day schools, 25 night schools, and four sewing schools had been built, as well as 12 bridges in Mérida state.

=== Agriculture and food policy ===
Mechanization was encouraged, due to it being seen as a good solution to both the agricultural labor shortage and the food deficit. The importation of machinery, modern farm implements and tractors was encouraged, and a special school was opened in Maracay to train operators of farm equipment. A series of irrigation projects was also launched in the northern half of Venezuela to expand the area of cultivation and increase land productivity. The estates of Medina‑affiliated military officers were also requisitioned. The Revolutionary Government Junta began a policy of land granting and credits. Nelson Rockefeller, owner of the Creole Petroleum Corporation, played an important role in the Junta's food policy through his consortium International Basic Economy Corporation, being invited to Venezuela in 1947.

=== Media policy ===
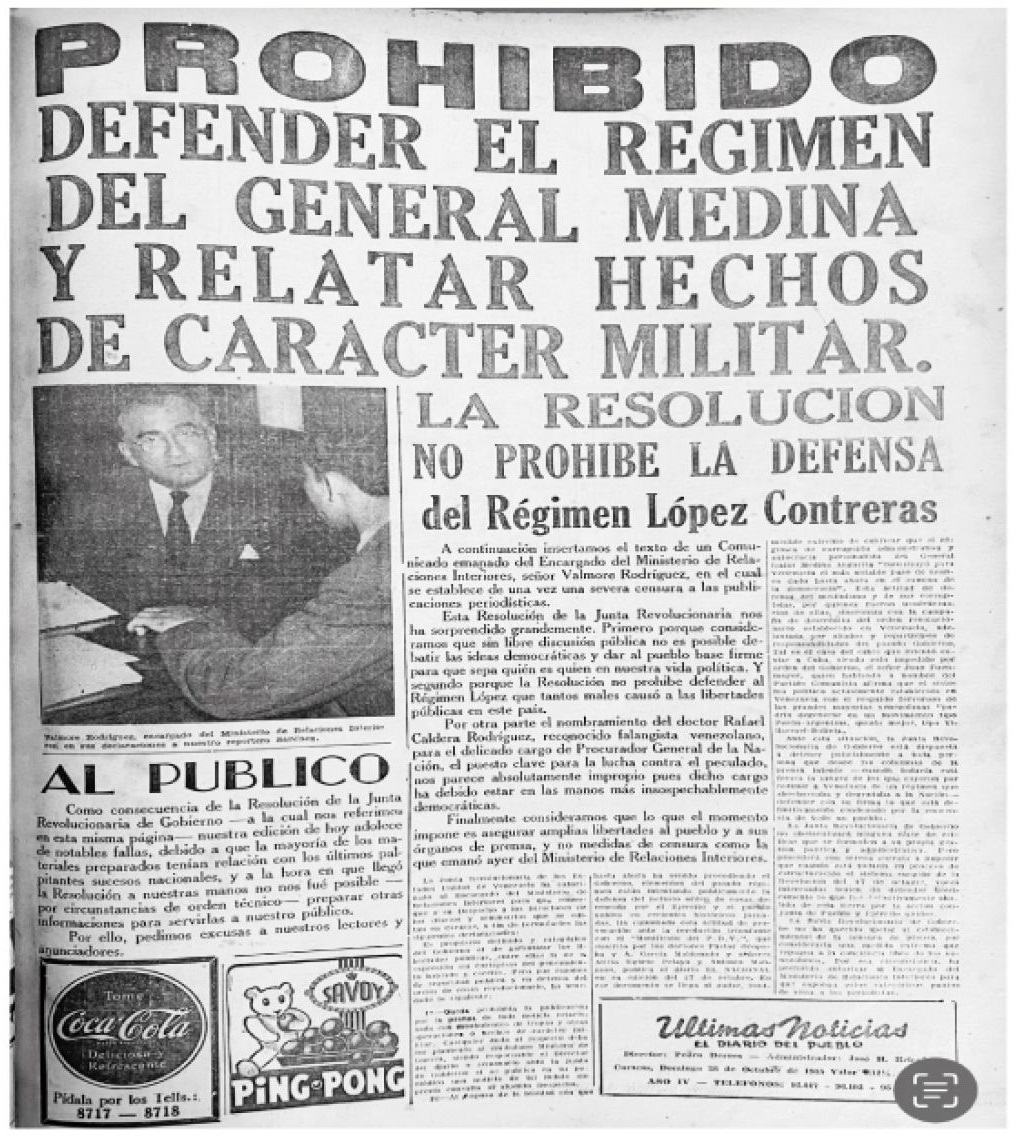
Headline of the newspaper Últimas Noticias: "It is forbidden to defend the regime of General Medina or to report events of a military nature. The resolution does not prohibit the defense of López Contreras's regime."

Once installed, the Revolutionary Government Junta held a press conference attended by reporters from El Universal, Últimas Noticias, El País, La Esfera, El Heraldo, El Nacional (including editor‑in‑chief Miguel Otero Silva), and a reporter from the Associated Press (AP).

On October 27, 1945, the media were prohibited from reporting on troop movements or other military operations.

On November 1, 1945, El Universal reported that the government had become the owner of the newspaper El Tiempo, until then a pro‑Medina medium.

On January 4, 1946, the weekly newspaper El Demócrata of Raúl Osuna was closed, accused of systematically insulting the revolutionary government.

During the first months of government, the Revolutionary Government Junta established the Ministry of Communications.

=== Immigration ===
On February 12, 1948, President Betancourt commented in Congress that between 1945 and 1947, 16,000 foreigners had arrived in the country through government action and another 25,000 on their own, declaring that: "Special missions of the Institute of Immigration and Colonization select in Europe, especially in Italy, new human contingents" who later settled in the country.

== Foreign policy ==
The Revolutionary Government Junta established the Gran Colombian Merchant Fleet together with Colombia and Ecuador. On the eve of Rómulo Gallegos's assumption in 1948, Betancourt denounced a plan to bomb Caracas from the Dominican Republic and Nicaragua to prevent Gallegos's inauguration, thanks to the cooperation between the dictatorships of Rafael Trujillo and Anastasio Somoza. These foreign rulers and the Spanish dictator Francisco Franco were enemies of Betancourt and financed his fall.

== Opposition ==
Opposition to the government was high in Táchira and Mérida states.

=== Political opposition ===
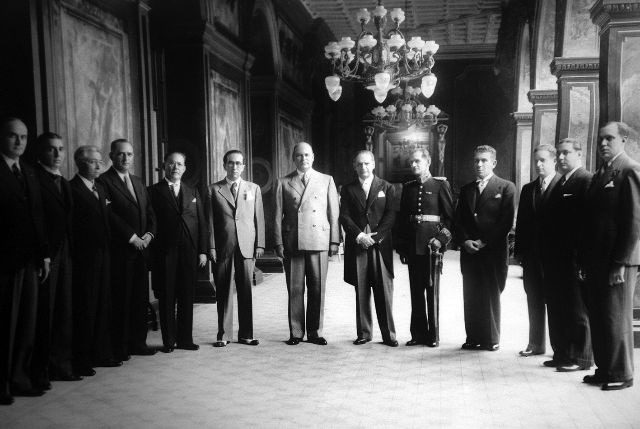
Almost the entire cabinet of Isaías Medina was arrested after the 1945 coup d'état

The political parties Democratic Republican Union (URD) and Copei were established, which politically opposed the Revolutionary Government Junta. On December 2, 1946, there was an uprising against the government. Jóvito Villalba was arrested in 1946 after being accused of participating in the 1946 Venezuelan coup d'état attempt.

=== Ecclesiastical opposition ===
The Catholic Church in Mérida played an important role in opposing the government, which they considered Marxist, supporting the Federal Republican Union (UFR).

== See also ==
- El Trienio Adeco
- Second presidency of Rómulo Betancourt
