= Reinaldo Leandro Mora =

Venezuelan politician (1920–2013)

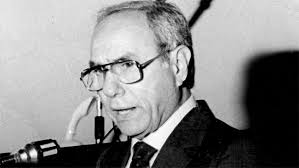

President of the Chamber of Deputies of the Congress of Venezuela
- In office 1984–1989
- Preceded by: Godofredo González
- Succeeded by: Octavio Lepage

Personal details
- Party: Democratic Action
- Profession: politician

Reinaldo Leandro Mora (May 23, 1920 – November 4, 2013) was a Venezuelan educator and politician. He was part of Democratic Action.

Mora was deputy Minister of Education between January and March 1961 and got his official designation as Minister from March 1961 to 1964, under President Rómulo Betancourt administration (1959-1964). Under President Raúl Leoni administration (1964-1969) he was the Venezuelan Plenipotentiary Ambassador in the Vatican. From 1966 to 1969, he was Minister of Internal Affairs. He was Senator in the former Venezuelan bicameral Congress (until 1999), and President of the Senate of Venezuela from 1984 to 1989.

== Teaching career ==
He was born in El Cardonal, La Guaira, in 1920. Reinaldo Leandro Mora was a professor at the Herzl Bialik Moral y Luces Jewish school.

== Political and diplomatic career ==
During the first government of Rómulo Betancourt, Mora promoted within Democratic Action Venezuela's support for the creation of the State of Israel in 1947, visiting it several times throughout his life. The Confederation of Jewish Associations of Venezuela stated that Mora "had great ties with Israel."

=== Minister of Education ===
He served as interim Minister of Education between January and March 1961 and as permanent minister from March of that year until 1964, under the second government of Rómulo Betancourt (1959–1964). In 1961, he inaugurated the Arturo Michelena Museum.

=== Ambassador to the Holy See ===
During the government of Raúl Leoni (1964–1969), he served as Ambassador Extraordinary and Plenipotentiary of the Republic of Venezuela to the Holy See.

=== Minister of Interior ===
Upon returning from his diplomatic mission, he was appointed Minister of Interior from 1966 to 1969 in Leoni's government. During this time, he guaranteed operating permission and funding to the Basque clandestine radio station in exile, Radio Euzkadi, which was already operating in Venezuela.

=== Senator (1969–1989) ===
He was a member of the political party Democratic Action, becoming a senator for Barinas state and a prominent member of his party's National Executive Committee (CEN).

He was one of the candidates before the party's National Convention to seek Democratic Action's candidacy for the presidency of the Republic, with a view to the presidential elections held on December 9, 1973. He was considered as a solid name for the Democratic Action candidature in 1982 and 1987, but he refused the idea of being presidential candidate again.

=== President of Congress (1984–1989) ===
Mora was president of the Congress of Venezuela between 1984 and 1989.

=== Senator (1989–2000) ===
Upon leaving his position as head of the Legislative Branch, Reinaldo Leandro Mora was appointed president of the Presidential Commission for the Delimitation of Marine and Submarine Areas with the Republic of Colombia in 1989, alongside Hilarión Cardozo for the COPEI party and Pompeyo Márquez of the Movimiento al Socialismo party.

== Death and funeral ==
Reinaldo Leandro Mora died in Caracas on November 4, 2013, being waked and buried in the Cementerio del Este.

== Personal life ==
Reinaldo Leandro Mora bought racehorses from José Alfredo Martínez de Hoz, future Argentine Minister of Economy, who used to travel to Caracas to do business and who anticipated to him the 1976 coup d'état, as well as the installation of the future dictatorship of the National Reorganization Process in Argentina, telling him about the preparation of his economic plan; Mora revealed this information to journalist Horacio Verbitsky in 1977.

== Legacy ==
Nelson Bocaranda, a Venezuelan journalist, wrote about his public service:

Reinaldo Leandro Mora was called for most of the people the "Friendship Prince". I agree. I met him during his days as Minister of Education under Betancourt's government and when he was Minister of Internal Affairs under Leoni's administration. I was 17 when I began in Radio Aeropuerto station, and he introduced me to the most important figures of Venezuelan politician world. I learned from him how to protect my sources. He believed in me when I walked by myself for first time into journalism. He was very grateful with his friends. He built bridges in these true democracy years that began in Venezuela in 1958. He never was rude or disrespectful with his political detractors. He was true militant of Accion Democratica. He had humility, charisma, culture and kindheartedness. Without doubt, Reinaldo Leandro Mora will be remembered for that.

== Publications ==
- Pintura venezolana 1661-1961 (1961)
- La Comunidad Nacional (1967)
- Fundación de La Guaira: Origen, desarrollo y destino de un pueblo (1967)
- La Constitución de la República: Sin vocación a riesgo de vigencia efímera (1986)
