= La Morita =

Community in Aragua, Venezuela

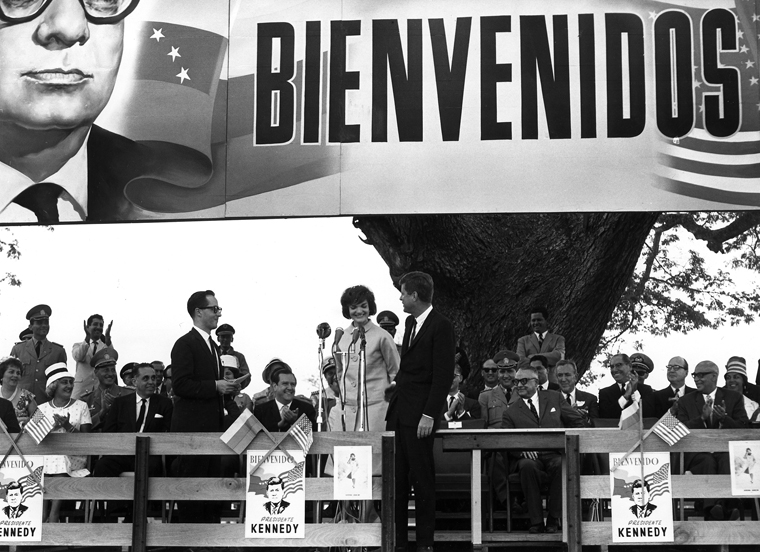

La Morita is a community in Aragua, Venezuela. It was a resettlement area and was visited by U.S. President John F. Kennedy and his wife Jacqueline Kennedy who met there with Venezuelan president Rómulo Betancourt during a visit. President Kennedy and President Betancourt made speeches. Jacqueline Kennedy also spoke in Spanish.

American missionaries established an outpost in La Morita and worked to build a radio station.

The area was established as an agrarian reform settlement.
