= Virginia Betancourt =

Former director of the National Library of Venezuela

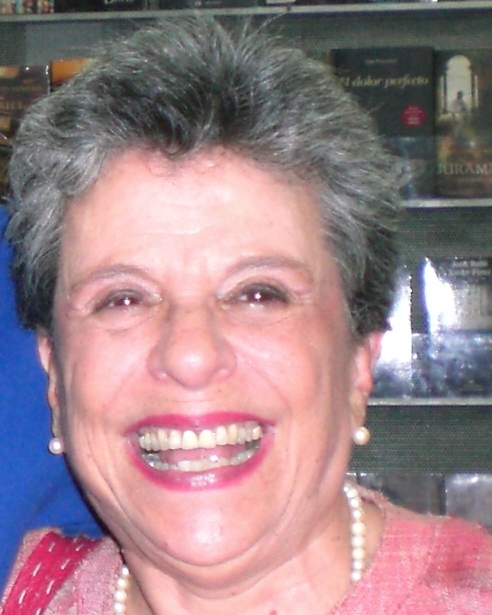

Virginia Betancourt Valverde (born 11 April 1935) is Venezuelan lecture educator and author. She served as Director of the National Library of Venezuela (Instituto Autónomo Biblioteca Nacional). She is the daughter of Rómulo Betancourt who served as president of Venezuela, was exiled, and then served again.

Betancourt was born in San Jose, Costa Rica. She wrote a book about libraries in Latin America.

Justo Molina photographed her in 1982. She gave an interview published April 2021.

== Writings ==
- Vida Familia (1890 - 1958) (2007)
- El Sistema Nacional de Bibliotecas e Información de Venezuela (SINASBI), 1974-1998; una experiencia latinoamericana exitosa en la formación de ciudadanía (2020)
