= Progressive Republican Party (Venezuela) =

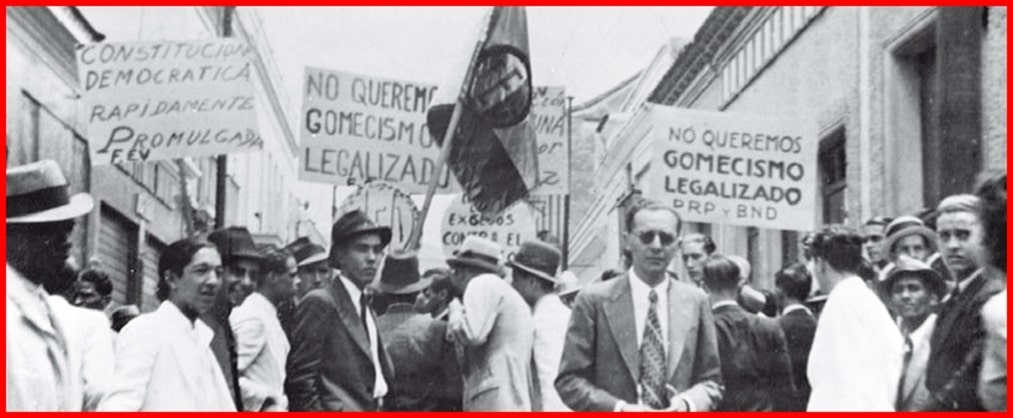
Protests of the PRP in 1936

The Progressive Republican Party (Partido Republicano Progresista, PRP) was a short-lived Communist party in Venezuela, established in March 1936. It was created by Miguel Acosta Saignes, Rodolfo Quintero, Carlos Irazábal, and Miguel Otero Silva, among others, as a way for communists to circumvent a constitutional prohibition on the formation of communist parties.

In 1937, the party joined forces with Organización Venezolana (ORVE), a political movement founded by Mariano Picón Salas and Rómulo Betancourt, to form the National Democratic Party (Partido Democrático Nacional, PDN). The aim was to gain influence ahead of the 1939 elections, but the PDN was banned by the end of that same year, and its leaders were forced into exile.
