= Tulio Chiossone =

Venezuelan historian and writer

Tulio Chiossone Villamizar (16 September 1905 – 26 December 2001) was a Venezuelan historian, writer, jurist and criminal lawyer, humanist, scholar, judge, legislator, politician, scholar and writer.

== Works published ==
- Annotations to the first book of the Penal Code, Printer, Mérida, 1930.
- Annotations to the Venezuelan Penal Code, Volume I, Editorial South America, Caracas, 1932.
- Child offenders. Typography Pencil, Mérida, 1935.
- Venezuelan prison reform, Graphic Arts, Caracas, 1936.
- The organization of prisons in Venezuela, Typographic Arts Cooperative, Caracas, 1936.
- Annotations to the Venezuelan Penal Code, Volumes I and II. Editorial Graphic Arts, Caracas, 1938.
- Venezuelan Social Issues, American Typography, Caracas, 1949.
- The term 'mental illness' in Venezuelan criminal law. American Typography, Caracas, 1952.
- What transgressional in legal dynamics, Editorial El Cojo. Caracas, 1954.
- Apuntaciones of prison law. Typography CTP San Juan de los Morros, 1954.
- Social problems in the formation of the Venezuelan State, American Graphic, Caracas, 1964.
- Criminal Procedure Manual (1st edition). Central University of Venezuela (UCV), Caracas, 1967.
- General principles for a theory of transgression, UCV, Caracas, 1968.
- Juvenile Behavior Disorders, UCV, Caracas, 1968.
- Legal limits of imprisonment, UCV, Caracas, 1969.
- Proposed reform of the code of criminal procedure, UCV, Caracas, 1972.
- Criminal Procedure Manual. UCV, Caracas, 1972.
- Venezuelan Criminal Law Handbook (1st edition). UCV, Caracas, 1972.
- Medical confidentiality, UCV. Caracas, 1974.
- The law and transgression, UCV, Caracas, 1975.
- Theory of the offense, UCV, Caracas, 1976.
- Contribution to the reform of criminal law Venezuela, UCV, Caracas, 1976.
- And criminal procedural issues, UCV, Caracas, 1977.
- Manual Venezuelan criminal procedural law. 3rd ed., UCV, Caracas, 1981.
- Crimes against nature and the environment, UCV, Caracas, 1982.
- Toponímico Dictionary of Venezuela. Monte Avila Editores, Caracas, 1992.
- Tachira State History, Authors and Topics Tachira, Caracas, 1982.
- Providing the Venezuelan indigenous languages into Castilian, National Academy of History, Caracas, 1993.

== See also ==
- Los Notables
