= Rómulo Betancourt =

President of Venezuela, 1945–48 and 1959–64

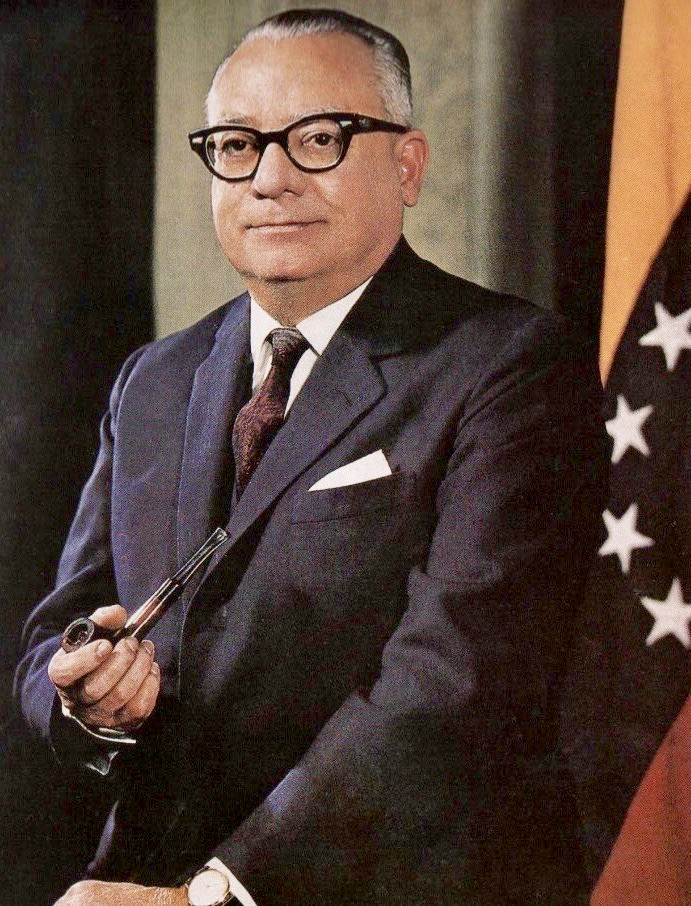

38th & 44th President of Venezuela
- In office 13 February 1959 – 13 March 1964
- Preceded by: Edgar Sanabria (interim)
- Succeeded by: Raúl Leoni
- In office 19 October 1945 – 15 February 1948
- Preceded by: Isaías Medina Angarita
- Succeeded by: Rómulo Gallegos

Senator for life
- In office 14 March 1964 – 28 September 1981

Personal details
- Born: Rómulo Ernesto Betancourt Bello; 22 February 1908 Guatire, Miranda state, Venezuela
- Died: 28 September 1981 (aged 73) New York City, United States
- Resting place: East Cemetery (Venezuela)
- Party: Democratic Action
- Spouse(s): Carmen Valverde (divorced) Renée Hartmann Viso
- Children: Virginia Betancourt
- Education: Central University of Venezuela

Rómulo Ernesto Betancourt Bello (22 February 1908 – 28 September 1981; Spanish pronunciation: [ˈromulo βetaŋˈkuɾ]), known as "The Father of Venezuelan Democracy", was a Venezuelan politician who served as the president of Venezuela, from 1945 to 1948 and again from 1959 to 1964, as well as leader of the Democratic Action, Venezuela's dominant political party in the 20th century.

Betancourt, one of Venezuela's most important political figures, led a tumultuous career in Latin American politics. Periods of exile brought Betancourt in contact with various Latin American countries as well as the United States, securing his legacy as one of the most prominent international leaders to emerge from 20th-century Latin America. Scholars credit Betancourt as the Founding Father of modern democratic Venezuela.

During his time as president, a wide range of progressive reforms were carried out in areas such as health, education, and housing.

== Early life ==
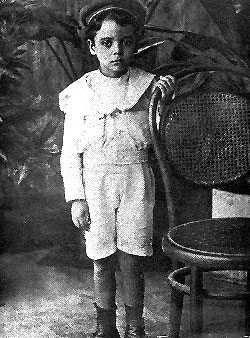
Rómulo Betancourt during his childhood

Betancourt was born in Guatire, a town near Caracas. His parents were Luis Betancourt Bello (of Canary origins) and Virginia Bello Milano. He attended a private school in Guatire, followed by high school at the Liceo Caracas in Caracas. He studied law at the Central University of Venezuela.

As a young man he was expelled from Venezuela for agitation and moved to Costa Rica where he founded, and led, a number of Communist student groups. In the early 1930s, while in Costa Rica, he became one of the main militants of that country's Communist Party at the young age of 22. He was active in the Communist Party from 1930 to his resignation in 1935. He founded the Partido Democrático Nacional, which became an official political party in 1941 as Acción Democrática (AD).

Colombian leader Jorge Eliécer Gaitán claimed Betancourt had "offered him arms and money to launch a revolution in Colombia" which was part of Betancourt's alleged plan to build a solid phalanx of left-wing regimes in the Caribbean.

== First presidency (1945–1948) ==
The Revolutionary Government Junta, also referred to as the first government of Rómulo Betancourt (1945–1948), was a de facto government of Venezuela, the first of the two governments of the Trienio Adeco, succeeding the government of Isaías Medina Angarita after the coup d'état self-styled as the October Revolution, organized by Democratic Action (AD) together with Marcos Pérez Jiménez, Carlos Delgado Chalbaud, and Mario Ricardo Vargas. The Junta was composed of five civilians and two military officers.

At the legislative and electoral level, elections were called for the Constituent Assembly of 1946, in which AD obtained an absolute majority. That Assembly ratified the Junta and promoted the 1947 constitution, which legalized full women's suffrage, and managed the first elections in which women voted for president. The leaders of the Junta prohibited themselves from running for any office in the elections they organized.

The Junta's judicial policy included the arrests and exiles of former presidents Isaías Medina Angarita (along with a large part of his cabinet) and Eleazar López Contreras, as well as the establishment of a Jury of Civil and Administrative Responsibility to evaluate corruption during the Gómez, López, and Medina administrations. In turn, the police were restructured and converted into the Dirección de Seguridad Nacional.

Energy policy saw the halting of oil concessions and a profit‑sharing agreement with foreign companies known as the "Fifty‑fifty". After his electoral victory, Rómulo Betancourt handed over power to his party colleague, Rómulo Gallegos. Betancourt later led a constitutional government between 1959 and 1964.

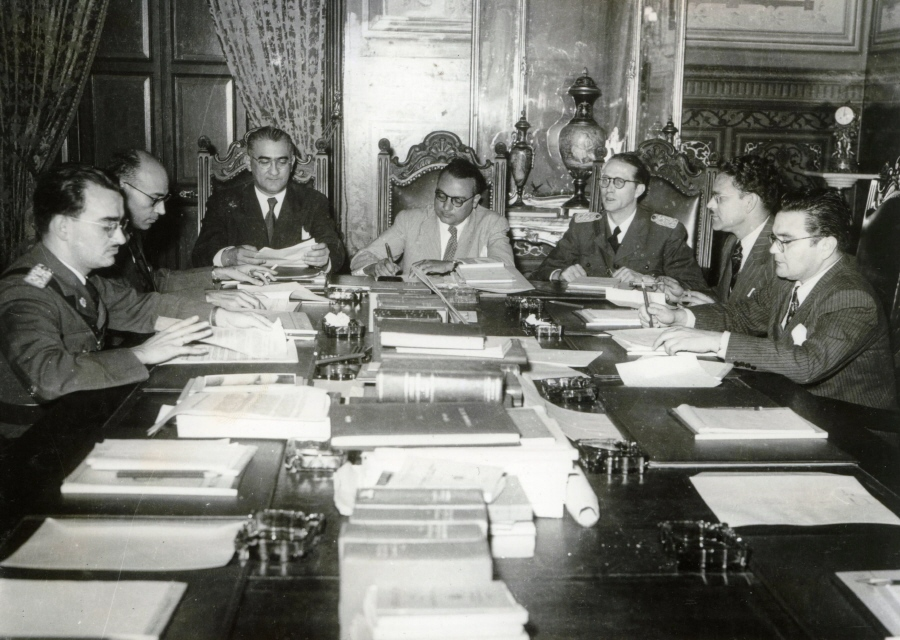
Members of the Revolutionary Government Junta, from left to right: Mario Ricardo Vargas, Raúl Leoni, Valmore Rodríguez, Rómulo Betancourt, Carlos Delgado Chalbaud, Edmundo Fernández and Gonzalo Barrios. Miraflores Palace, 1945

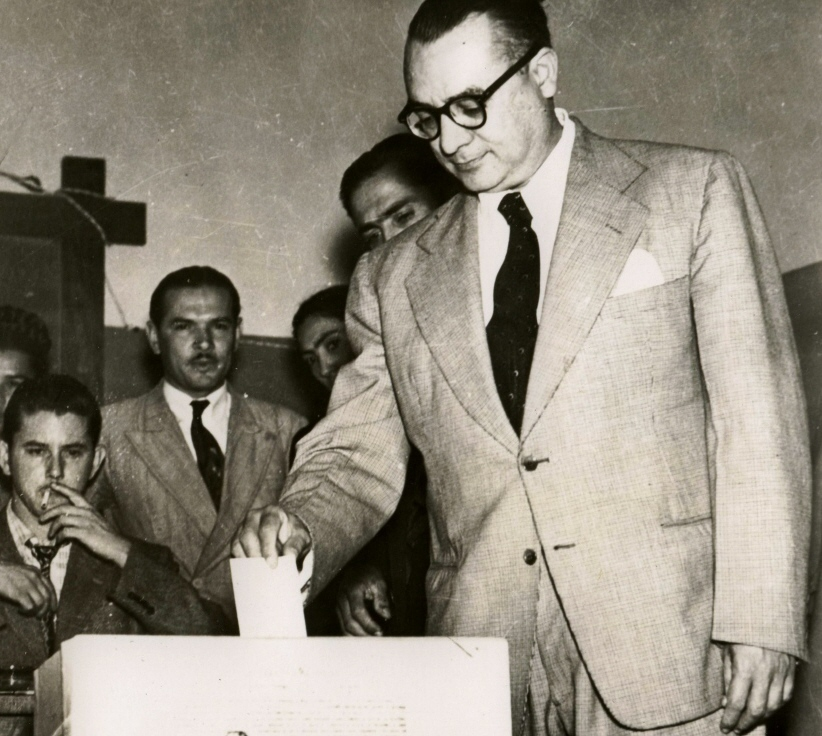
Rómulo Betancourt voting at the 1946 Venezuelan Constituent Assembly election

=== Government Junta cabinet (1945–1948) ===
Ministries
OFFICE	NAME	TERM
President	Rómulo Betancourt	1945–1948
Home Affairs	Valmore Rodríguez	1945–1946
Home Affairs	Mario Ricardo Vargas	1946–1948
Foreign Relations	Carlos Morales	1945–1947
Foreign Relations	Gonzalo Barrios	1947–1948
Finance	Carlos D'Ascoli	1945–1947
Finance	Manuel Pérez Guerrero	1947–1948
Defense	Carlos Delgado Chalbaud	1945–1948
Development	Juan Pablo Pérez Alfonso	1945–1948
Public Works	Luis Lander	1945–1946
Public Works	Eduardo Mier y Terán	1946–1947
Public Works	Edgar Pardo Stolk	1947–1948
Education	Humberto García Arocha	1945–1946
Education	Antonio Anzola Carrillo	1946–1947
Education	Luis Beltrán Prieto Figueroa	1947–1948
Labor	Raúl Leoni	1945–1948
Communications	Mario Ricardo Vargas	1945–1946
Communications	Valmore Rodríguez	1946–1947
Communications	Antonio Martín Araujo	1947–1948
Agriculture	Eduardo Mendoza Goiticoa	1945–1947
Agriculture	Ricardo Montilla	1947–1948
Health and Social Assistance	Edmundo Fernández	1945–1948
Secretary of the Junta	Luis Beltrán Prieto Figueroa	1945–1947
Secretary of the Junta	José Giacoppini Zárraga	1947–1948

=== International trips ===
Date	Location	Main purpose
July 1946	Mexico	Official visit. First Venezuelan head of state to visit Mexico.

== Third exile ==
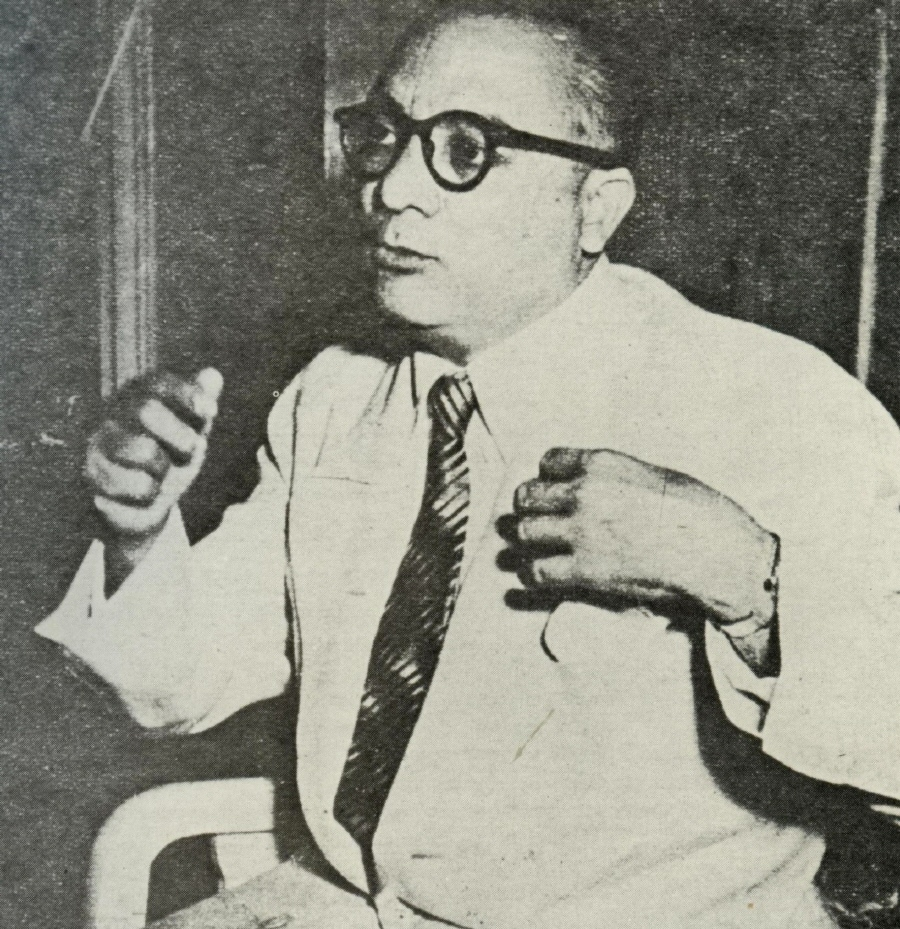
Rómulo Betancourt during his exile in Havana, Cuba, 1949

Betancourt presided over the country's first free elections, in 1947, which were won by the AD's Rómulo Gallegos. However, on 27 November 1948, Carlos Delgado Chalbaud, Marcos Pérez Jiménez and Luis Felipe Llovera Páez launched the 1948 Venezuelan coup d'état and overthrew Gallegos after just ten months in office. Betancourt went into exile in New York City. In exile he planned a political return sustained on democratic principles and open elections legitimizing his national leadership role. His forward vision and strategy was successful and Betancourt was elected president by his own people upon returning to Venezuela. He had been determined to expose to the world the political problems and dictatorships that plagued the country through most of its modern history – a risky proposition.

== Second presidency (1959–1964) ==
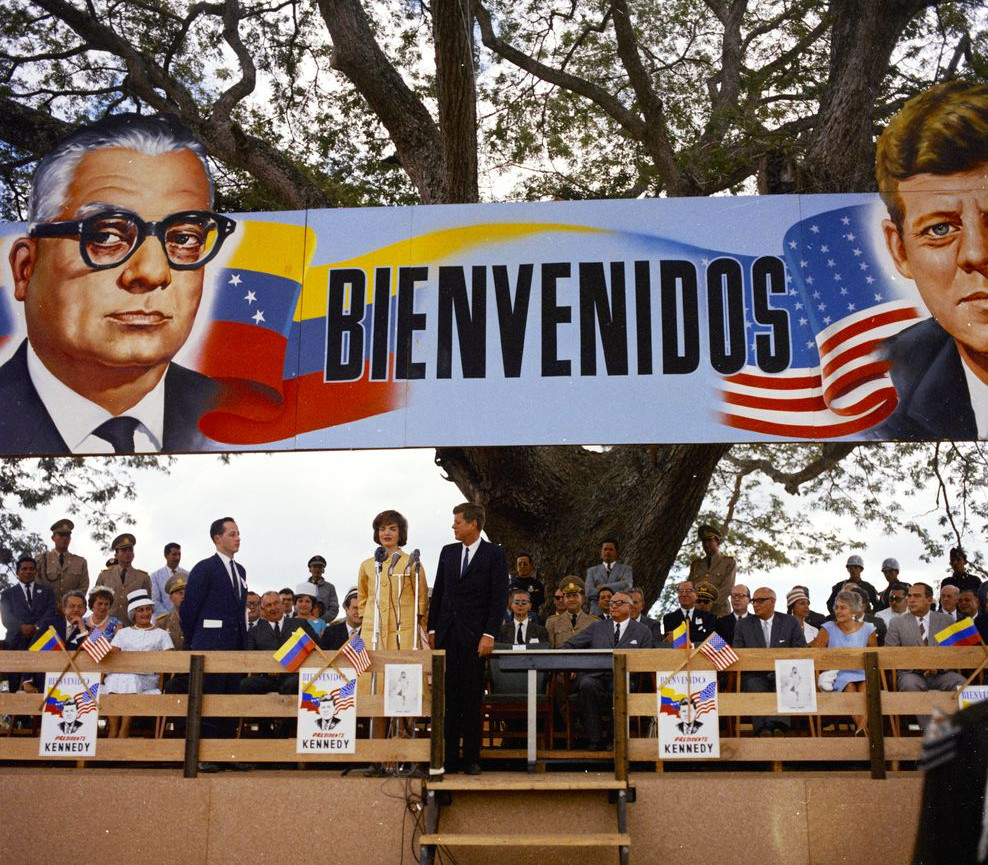
U.S. President John F. Kennedy in December 1961 promoting the Alliance for Progress with Venezuelan President Rómulo Betancourt, who had invited Kennedy to this land redistribution ceremony in a Venezuelan village. Kennedy's wife, Jacqueline, addressed the audience in Spanish. Video of this ceremony can be seen here.

A decade later, after Pérez Jiménez was ousted, Betancourt was elected president in the general election of 1958, becoming the first leader of the Punto Fijo Pact. Having inherited a well constructed country but with the need to give more education to its people, Betancourt nevertheless managed to return the state to fiscal solvency despite the rock-bottom petroleum prices throughout his presidency.

Two important institutions were created by Juan Pablo Pérez Alfonso, Betancourt's minister of Mines and Hydrocarbons, in 1960. First, the Venezuelan Petroleum Corporation (Corporación Venezolana del Petróleo — CVP) was conceived to oversee the national petroleum industry. Second, Venezuela was instrumental in establishing the Organization of the Petroleum Exporting Countries (OPEC), an international oil cartel, in partnership with Kuwait, Saudi Arabia, Iraq, and Iran. Considered a radical revolutionary idea at the time by its opponents, it was viewed as essential to Venezuela's independence and fiscal solvency by Betancourt. The creation of OPEC was triggered by a 1960 law instituted by American President Dwight Eisenhower that forced quotas for Venezuelan oil and favored Canada and Mexico's oil industries. Eisenhower cited national security, land access to energy supplies, at times of war.

Betancourt reacted seeking an alliance with oil producers of Middle Orient and North Africa as a pre-emptive strategy to protect the continuous autonomy and profitability of Venezuela's oil. At an annual oil convention in Cairo, Venezuela's envoy, fluent in Arabic, convinced oil producing Middle Eastern countries to sign a secret agreement that promoted unity and control of their own national oil resources. The agreement was made under the noses of the British and American corporations that dominated the oil industry globally and had funded the event. OPEC was founded in September 1960 at Baghdad, Iraq, a strong cartel that survives to this day.

On a scenario of suspended economic guarantees, special situation derived from the Castro-communist armed insurrection, Betancourt adopted the CEPAL model of substitution of imports in order to achieve a fast track to development through industrialization that succeeds in replacing imported goods with locally produced goods. The government strategy included tax exemptions to attract capital investment and land at low cost to facilitate foreign suppliers building plants for the assembly or packaging of finished products, closing the economy to import trade through high taxes on similar imported goods and import quotas to reduce foreign competition or other quantitative restrictions that prohibited imports. In addition, the Central Bank overvalued the Bolivar to cut down prices of imported inputs and promote export-oriented growth. Large road-building, and electrical power programs, such as the construction of Guri Dam Phase I were carried out, transforming Venezuela into a modernized Latin American nation.

=== FALN guerrilla group ===
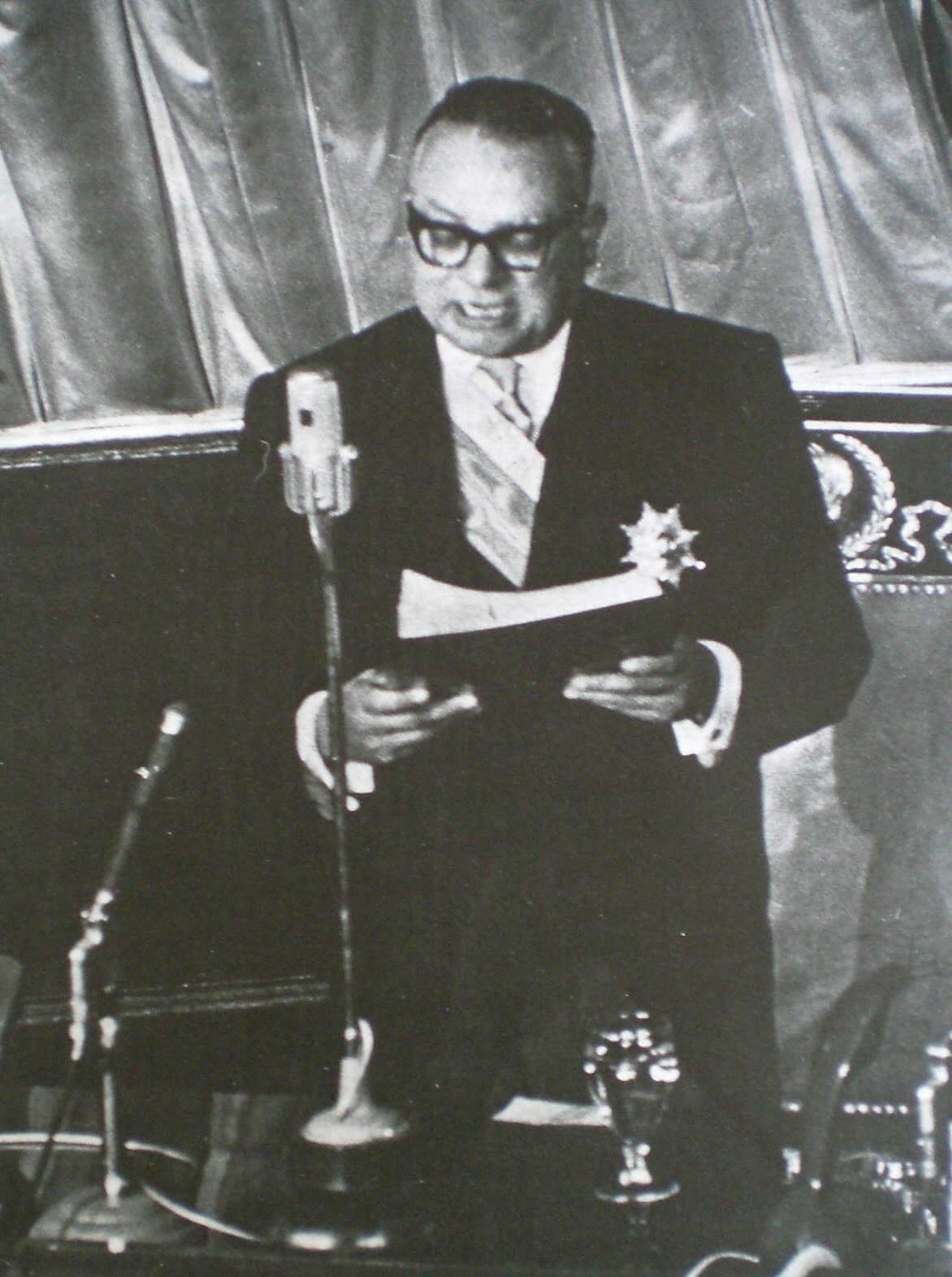
Betancourt's inaugural address in 1959

Betancourt also faced determined opposition from extremists and rebellious army units, yet he continued to push for economic and educational reform. A faction split from the AD and formed the Revolutionary Left Movement (MIR). When leftists were involved in unsuccessful revolts at Barcelona (El Barcelonazo) in 1961 and in navy bases in 1962 (El Carupanazo, Carúpano, and El Porteñazo, Puerto Cabello), Betancourt suspended civil liberties. Elements of the left parties then formed the Armed Forces for National Liberation (FALN), a communist guerrilla army to fight him. This drove the leftists underground, where they engaged in rural and urban guerrilla activities, including sabotaging oil pipelines, bombing a Sears Roebuck warehouse, Alfredo Di Stefano's kidnapping, and bombing the United States Embassy in Caracas. FALN failed to rally the rural poor and to disrupt the December 1963 elections.

After numerous attacks, he finally arrested the MIR and Communist Party of Venezuela (PCV) members of Congress. It became clear that Fidel Castro had been arming the rebels, so Venezuela protested to the Organization of American States (OAS).

=== Constitutional government cabinet (1959–1964) ===
Ministries
OFFICE	NAME	TERM
President	Rómulo Betancourt	1959–1964
Home Affairs	Luis Augusto Dubuc	1959–1962
	Carlos Andrés Pérez	1962–1963
	Manuel Mantilla	1963–1964
Foreign Relations	Ignacio Luis Arcaya	1959–1960
	Marcos Falcón Briceño	1960–1964
Finance	José Antonio Mayobre	1959–1960
	Tomás Enrique Carrillo Batalla	1960–1961
	Andrés Germán Otero	1961–1964
Defense	Josué López Hernández	1959–1961
	Antonio Briceño Linares	1961–1964
Development	Lorenzo Fernández	1959–1961
	Godofredo González	1961–1963
	Hugo Pérez La Salvia	1963–1964
Public Works	Santiago Hernández Ron	1959–1960
	Rafael De León Alvarez	1960–1962
	Leopoldo Sucre Figarella	1962–1964
Education	Rafael Pizani	1959–1960
	Martín Pérez Guevara	1960–1961
	Reinaldo Leandro Mora	1961–1964
Justice	Andrés Aguilar	1959–1962
	Miguel Ángel Landáez	1962–1963
	Ezequiel Monsalve	1963–1964
Mines and Hydrocarbons	Juan Pablo Pérez Alfonso	1959–1963
	Arturo Hernández Grisanti	1963–1964
Labor	Luis Hernández Solís	1959–1960
	Raúl Valera	1960–1963
	Alberto Aranguren Zamora	1963–1964
Communications	Manuel López Rivas	1959–1960
	Juan Manuel Domínguez Chacín	1960
	Pablo Miliani	1960–1964
Agriculture	Victor Manuel Giménez Landínez	1959–1963
	Miguel Rodríguez Viso	1963–1964
Health and Social Assistance	Arnoldo Gabaldón	1959–1964
Secretary of Presidency	Ramón José Velásquez	1959–1963
	Mariano Picón Salas	1963–1964
Office of Coordination and Planification	Manuel Pérez Guerrero	1959–1962
	Héctor Hurtado	1962–1964
CVG	Rafael Alfonzo Ravard	1960–1964

=== Betancourt Doctrine ===
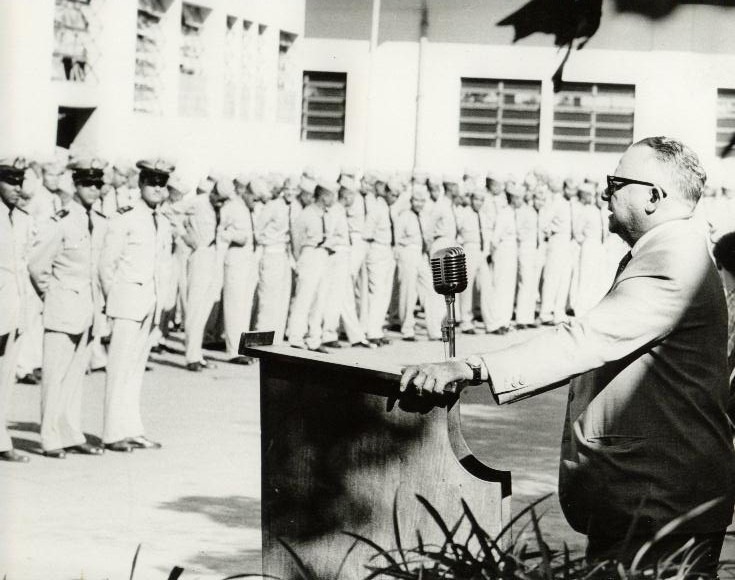
Rómulo Betancourt during a speech to a group of officers

The Venezuelan president's antipathy for nondemocratic rule was reflected in the so-called Betancourt Doctrine, which denied Venezuelan diplomatic recognition to any regime, right or left, that came to power by military force. Betancourt always defended, and represented, democratic values and principles in Latin America. This put him at odds with the military strongmen who came to dominate and define political perception of the region. During his first message to Congress as President of Venezuela, on 12 February 1959, Betancourt said:

"... Regimes disrespectful of human rights, violating their citizens´ freedom, tyrannizing them with the backing of totalitarian political police, should be submitted to a rigorous sanitary cordon and eradicated, through collective pacification, from the Inter-American juridical community"

== Later life ==
In 1964, Betancourt was awarded a lifetime seat in Venezuela's senate, due to his status as a former president. His last days were dedicated to writing and to his wife Dr. Renee Hartmann. He died on 28 September 1981 in Doctors Hospital in New York City. On his death U.S. President Ronald Reagan made the following statement:

I speak for all Americans in expressing our heartfelt sadness at the death of Romulo Betancourt. While he was first and foremost a Venezuelan patriot, Romulo Betancourt was an especially close friend of the United States. During the 1950s he considered the United States a refuge while he was in exile, and we were proud to receive him. We are honored that this courageous man whose life was dedicated to the principles of liberty and justice – a man who fought dictatorships of the right and the left – spent his final days on our shores. We join the Venezuelan people and those who love freedom around the world in mourning his death.

== Personal life ==
Betancourt was married to Carmen Valverde, who became First Lady of Venezuela from 1945 to 1948,, and 1959–1964. Virginia Betancourt Valverde was the Betancourt's only child. They divorced and he married Dr. Renee Hartmann.

== In popular culture ==
The documentary film Rómulo Resiste (English: Rómulo Resists), directed by Carlos Oteyza, focuses on Betancourt's presidency between 1959 and 1964, after dictator Marcos Pérez Jiménez was deposed.

== Bibliography ==
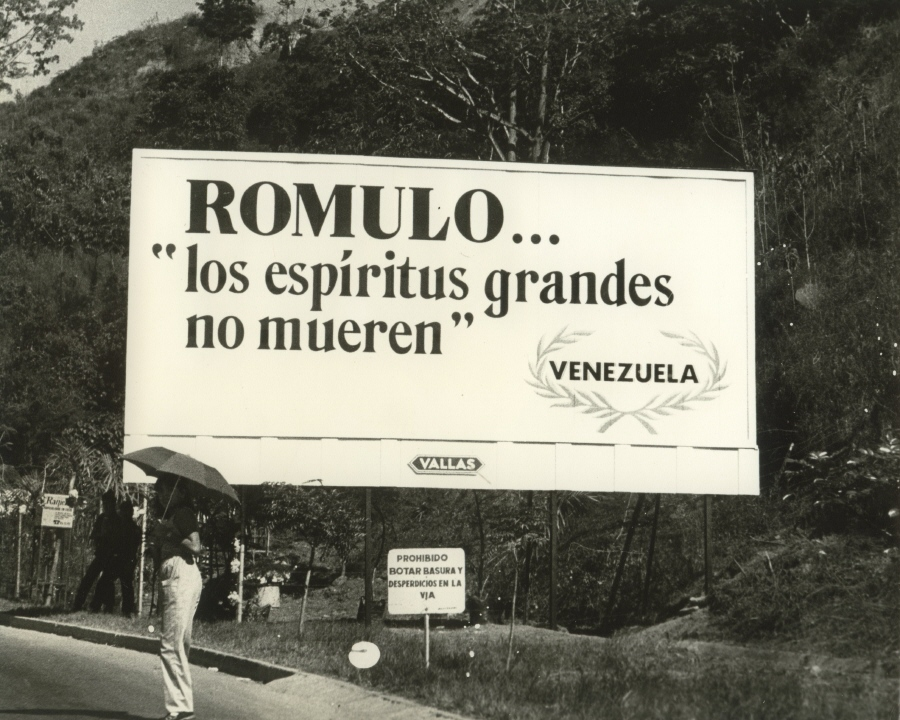
Rómulo... "great spirits do not die". Advertising published after the death of Betancourt in 1981

- Cecilio Acosta (1928)
- Dos meses en las cárceles de Gómez (1928)
- En las huellas de la pezuña (1929)
- Con quién estamos y contra quién estamos (1932)
- Una República en venta (1932)
- Problemas venezolanos (1940)
- Un reportaje y una conferencia (1941)
- El caso de Venezuela y el destino de la democracia en América (1949)
- Escuelas y despensa, los dos pivotes de la reforma educacional (1951)
- Campos de concentración para los venezolanos y millones de dólares para las compañias petroleras (1952)
- Venezuela, factoría petrolera (1954)
- Venezuela: política y petróleo (1956)
- Posición y Doctrina (1958)
- Venezuela rinde cuentas (1962)
- Posibilidades y obstáculos de la Revolución Democrática (1965)
- Golpes de estado y gobiernos de fuerza en América Latina; la dramática experiencia dominicana (1966)
- Latin America: its problems and possibilities (1966)
- Hacia una América Latina democrática e integrada (1967)
- Venezuela dueña de su petróleo (1975)
- José Alberto Velandia: ejemplo para las nuevas generaciones de Venezuela (1975)
- El Petróleo de Venezuela (1976)
- Acción Democrática, un partido para hacer historia (1976)
- El 18 de octubre de 1945. Génesis y realizaciones de una revolución democrática (1979)

== Books ==
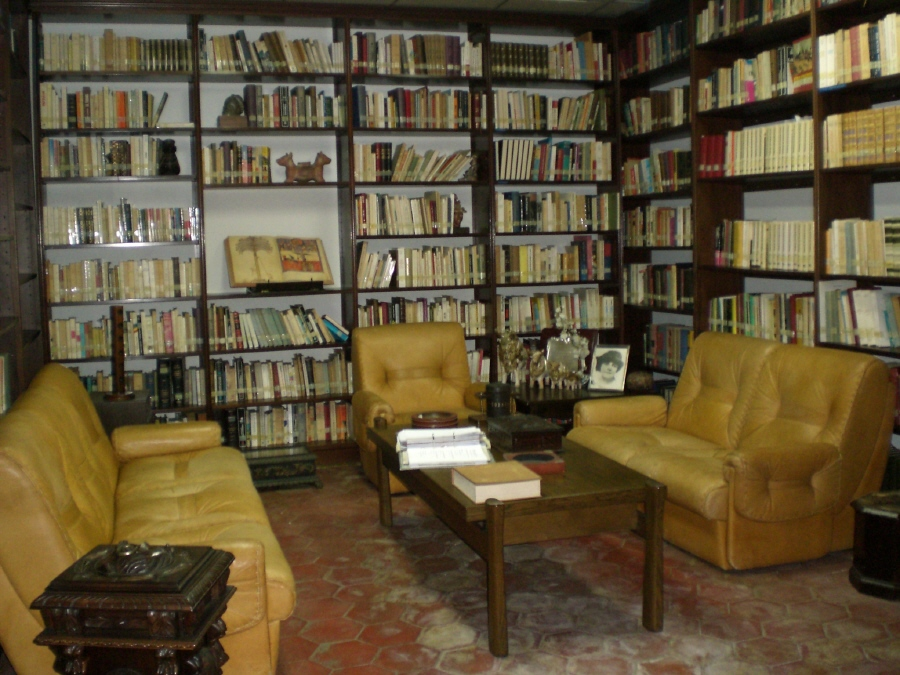
Betancourt's Personal Library - Rómulo Betancourt Foundation, Caracas

- Venezuela: Oil & Politics; 1978; by Rómulo Betancourt; ISBN 0-395-27945-3
- Rómulo Betancourt; 1977; by Manuel Caballero
- Rómulo en Berna; 1978; by Luis González Herrera
- Rómulo Betancourt en la historia de Venezuela del siglo XX; 1980; by Ramón J. Velásquez, J.F. Sucre Figarella, Blas Bruni Celli
- Rómulo Betancourt and the Transformation of Venezuela; 1981; by Robert J. Alexander; ISBN 0-87855-450-5
- Rómulo y Yo; 1984; by Renée Hartmann; ISBN 84-253-1625-1
- Rómulo; 1984; by Sanin
- Rómulo Betancourt, Político sin ocaso; 1988; compilation book
- Rómulo Betancourt, Político de Nación; 2004; by Manuel Caballero; ISBN 980-354-154-4
- Rómulo Betancourt; 2005; by María Teresa Romero; ISBN 980-6915-07-0
- Mi Abuelo Rómulo; 2013; by Alvaro Pérez Betancourt and Claudia González Gamboa; ISBN 978-980408-022-7

== See also ==
- First presidency of Rómulo Betancourt
- Second presidency of Rómulo Betancourt

== Works cited ==
- Herman, Donald (1980). Christian Democracy in Venezuela. University of North Carolina Press. ISBN 0807814253.

Political offices
Preceded by Isaías Medina Angarita	President of Venezuela; 1945–1948	Succeeded by Rómulo Gallegos
Preceded by Edgar Sanabria	President of Venezuela; 1959–1964	Succeeded by Raúl Leoni
Party political offices
Preceded by Rómulo Gallegos	Democratic Action nominee for President of Venezuela; 1958	Succeeded by Raúl Leoni
