= Eleazar López Contreras =

President of Venezuela from 1935 to 1941

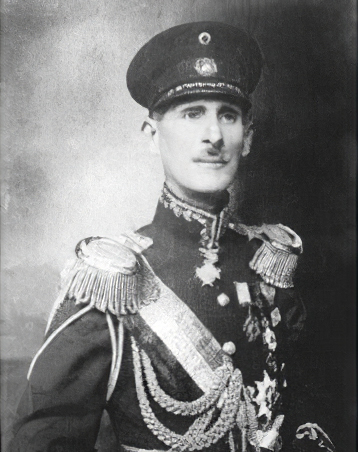

36th President of Venezuela
- In office 18 December 1935 – 5 May 1941
- Preceded by: Juan Vicente Gómez
- Succeeded by: Isaías Medina Angarita

Ministry of War
- In office 22 April 1931 – 17 December 1935
- President: Juan Bautista Pérez; Juan Vicente Gómez
- Preceded by: Tobías Utribe
- Succeeded by: Antonio Chalboud Cardona

Senator for life
- In office 23 January 1961 – 2 January 1973

Personal details
- Born: 5 May 1883 Queniquea, Táchira, Venezuela
- Died: 2 January 1973 (aged 89) Caracas, Venezuela
- Party: Independent
- Spouse(s): Luz María Volkmar; Luisa Elena Mijares; María Teresa Núñez
- Children: Blanca Rosa López; Eleazar López; Cristina López; Cecilia López; Fernando López; Margarita López; Mercedes Enriqueta López; María Teresa López
- Profession: General, Politician

Military service
- Branch/service: Army of Cipriano Castro; Army of Venezuela
- Years of service: 1899−1941
- Rank: Vice Commander (final)
- Commands: Libertador Battalion; Carabobo Battalion; Army of Venezuela
- Battles/wars: Batalla de La Victoria; Batalla del Tocuyito
- López Contreras's voice López Contreras addresses the country for the first time after Gómez’s death. Recorded December 1935

José Eleazar López Contreras (5 May 1883 – 2 January 1973) was a Venezuelan politician who served as the 36th President of Venezuela from 1935 to 1941. He was Minister of War under President Juan Vicente Gómez from 1931 to 1935.

Gómez fell into a coma and died in 1935, and López was selected to succeed him. A new constitution was created in 1936, and López did some reforms for workers and oil companies.

== Early life ==
Eleazar López Contreras was born in Queniquea, Venezuela, on 5 May 1883, to Manuel María López Trejo and María Catalina Contreras Mora. López's father died from malaria a few days after his birth. Fernando María Contreras, a priest and López's uncle, was a father figure to López. He attended schools in Capacho Viejo and Capacho Nuevo before moving to La Grita in 1893. He attended Jesús Manuel Jáuregui's Sacred Heart of Jesus School in La Grita before graduating in 1898.

López supported Cipriano Castro during the Restorative Liberal Revolution. He was wounded at the Battle of Tocuyito on 14 September 1899, and had surgery done on his left arm. Castro appointed López as his aide-de-camp. He was garrison commander in Tucacas in 1901, second-in-command at Casa Fuerte de Barcelona from 1902 to 1905, and appointed head of the Cristóbal Colón Customs House in 1907.

== Presidency ==
Juan Vicente Gómez entered a coma on 15 December and died on 17 December 1935, after holding power in Venezuela for 27 years. López was the designated successor of Gómez and the cabinet voted to make him acting president so that there would be no vacuum of power after Gómez's death. López became provisional president after Gómez's death and the Congress of Venezuela elected him to serve the remainder of Gómez's term two weeks later. On 25 April 1936, Congress voted to give him a full term by a vote of 132 to 1.

López announced on 2 January 1936, that La Rotunda the main political prison in Venezuela, would be demolished. People were allowed into La Rotunda and other political prisons to see the facilities themselves.

In 1939, López accepted on behalf of Venezuela the ships Koenigstein and Caribia which had fled with Jews from Germany.

=== Economics ===
Protests against Gómez broke out in 1935, and continued against López in 1936. In February 1936, López announced the February Program which would promote labor rights, education, better management of public funds, the modernization of agriculture, and economic development. That same year, a labor law providing various rights for workers was introduced.

The large fortune that Gómez acquired during his dictatorship was nationalized by López in July 1936. López initially opposed nationalizing the wealth and allowed over 90 of Gómez's relatives to leave the country with money. Corruption charges were filed against Pedro Manuel Arcaya and other members of Gómez's cabinet.

Legislation allowing collective bargaining and profit-sharing and requiring compensation for laid-off workers and companies to help combat malaria was passed in 1936. The Standard Oil Company of New Jersey sued against the provision requiring compensation to laid-off workers on 13 April 1937, and the Supreme Court of Justice of Venezuela ruled in Standard Oil's favor on 19 April.

=== Oil ===
Royal Dutch Shell, Standard Oil, and Gulf Oil were the major oil companies in Venezuela when López became president. An export tax on oil shipped from Venezuela was prohibited by the pre-1936 constitution, but this was omitted in the 1936 constitution. Oil concessions to private people was ended by López in 1938.

Petroleum workers started striking in the Maracaibo region on 11 December 1936, and this continued until it was ended by a presidential degree from López on 22 January 1937. There was a 39% decrease in oil production during the strike and 6.5 million bolívares lost. Oil companies instituted some reforms such as increasing the wages to 8 bolívares a day and improving living conditions.

=== Democracy ===
A new constitution was passed by Congress in 1936, and this restricted voting rights to literate males over the age of 21; over half of Venezuelans could not read. The Venezuelan Organizing Movement, Progressive Republican Party, and other left-wing groups were banned in 1937.

López supported gradual democratization, while fearing competitive politics. He held the view that the president must manipulate the political system to avoid what he saw as destructive political changes. He was ideologically conservative.

The presidential term's length was reduced from seven years to five years by López. López considered letting a civilian succeed him as president, but was persuaded by his military colleagues not to. Isaías Medina Angarita, who was Minister of War under him, succeeded López as president.

=== Cabinet members ===
Cabinet
OFFICE	NAME	TERM
President	Eleazar López Contreras	1935–1941
Interior Affairs	Pedro Tinoco	1935–1936
Interior Affairs	Diógenes Escalante	1936
Interior Affairs	Alejandro Lara	1936
Interior Affairs	Régulo Olivares	1936–1937
Interior Affairs	Alfonso Mejía	1937–1938
Interior Affairs	Luis Gerónimo Pietri	1938–1941
Foreign Affairs	Pedro Itriago Chacín	1935–1936
Foreign Affairs	Esteban Gil Borges	1936–1941
Finance	Efraim González	1935–1936
Finance	Gustavo Herrera	1936
Finance	Alejandro Lara	1936
Finance	Alberto Adriani	1936
Finance	Cristóbal L. Mendoza	1937–1938
Finance	Francisco J. Parra	1938–1941
War and Navy	Antonio Chalbaud Cardona	1935–1936
War and Navy	Isaías Medina Angarita	1936–1941
Development	Pedro París	1936
Development	Nestor Luis Pérez	1936–1938
Development	Manuel R. Egaña	1938–1941
Public Works	Antonio Díaz	1935–1936
Public Works	Tomás Pacaninis	1936–1938
Public Works	Enrique Jorge Aguerrevere	1938–1941
Public Instruction	R. González Rincones	1935–1936
Public Instruction	José Ramón Ayala	1936
Public Instruction	Caracciolo Parra Pérez	1936
Public Instruction	Rómulo Gallegos	1936
Public Instruction	Alberto Smith	1936–1937
Public Instruction	Rafael Ernesto López	1937–1938
Public Instruction	Enrique Tejera	1938–1939
Public Instruction	Arturo Uslar Pietri	1939–1941
Sanitation and Agriculture	R. González Rincones	1935–1936
Health and Social Welfare	Enrique Tejera	1936
Health and Social Welfare	Santos A. Dominici	1936–1937
Health and Social Welfare	Honorio Sigala	1937–1938
Health and Social Welfare	Julio García Álvarez	1938–1941
Agriculture	Alberto Adriani	1936
Agriculture	Alfonso Mejía	1936–1937
Agriculture	Hugo Parra Pérez	1937–1938
Agriculture	Amenodoro Rangel Lamus	1938–1939
Agriculture	Alfonso Mejía	1939–1941
Communications	Francisco H. Rivero	1936
Communications	Honorio Sigala	1936
Communications	Alejandro Lara	1936–1937
Communications	Luis Gerónimo Pietri	1937–1938
Communications	Héctor Cuenca	1938–1939
Communications	José Rafael Pocaterra	1939–1941
Secretary of the Presidency	Amenodoro Rangel	1935-1936
Secretary of the Presidency	Francisco Parra	1936
Secretary of the Presidency	Diógenes Escalante	1936–1938
Secretary of the Presidency	Alfonso Mejía	1938–1939
Secretary of the Presidency	Tulio Chiossone	1939−1941
Secretary	Amenodoro Rangel Lamus	1935-1937

== Later life ==
Medina was overthrown in 1945, and both he and López were arrested and then sent into exile. López chose to stay in exile even after he was invited to return in 1947, and did not return to Venezuela until 1951. López died on 2 January 1973.

== Personal life ==
In 1907, López married Luz María Wolkmar Hernández, with whom he had six children before Luz's death in an unknown year. He married Luisa Elena Mijares in 1924, and separated in an unknown year. In 1933, he married María Teresa Núñez Tovar, with whom he had two children.

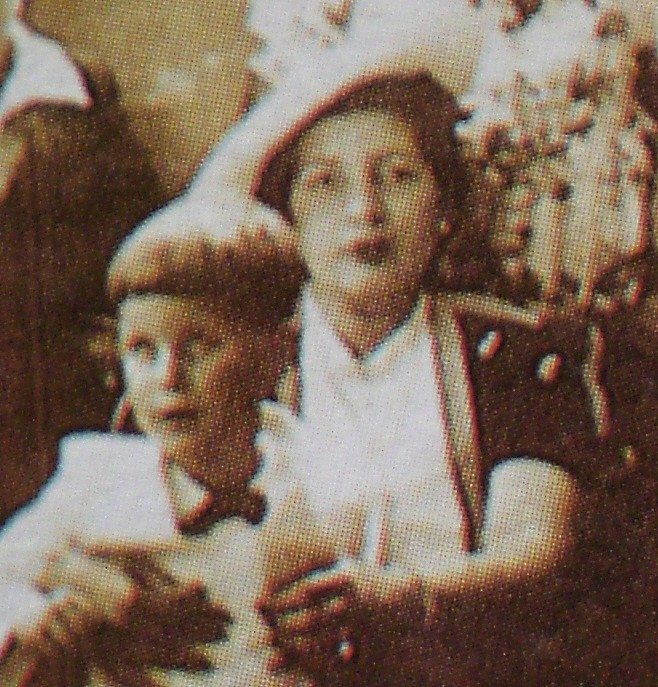
María Teresa Núñez Tovar

== See also ==
- Presidents of Venezuela
- List of Venezuelans

== Works cited ==
=== Books ===
- Diamond, Larry; Linz, Juan; Lipset, Seymour, eds. (1989). Democracy In Developing Countries: Latin America. Vol. 4. Lynne Rienner Publishers. ISBN 1555870430.
- Yarrington, Doug (2025). Profitable Offices: Corruption, Anticorruption, and the Formation of Venezuela’s Neopatrimonial State, 1908-1948. University of Pittsburgh Press. ISBN 0822948508.

=== Journals ===
- Ellner, Steve (1995). "Venezuelan Revisionist Political History, 1908-1958: New Motives and Criteria for Analyzing the Past". Latin American Research Review. 30 (2). Latin American Studies Association: 91–121. doi:10.2307/2503835. JSTOR 2503835.
- Singh, Kelvin (1989). "Oil Politics in Venezuela during the López Contreras Administration (1936-1941)". Journal of Latin American Studies. 21 (1). Cambridge University Press: 89–104. doi:10.2307/157250. JSTOR 157250.

=== News ===
- "Eleazar Lopez Contreras, 89, Former President of Venezuela". The New York Times. 3 January 1973. p. 42.
- Lucca, Rafael (10 July 2022). "Eleazar López Contreras: el modernizador del Estado (I Parte)". La Gran Aldea. Archived from the original on 17 January 2026.

Political offices
Preceded by Juan Vicente Gómez	President of Venezuela; 1935–1941	Succeeded by Isaías Medina Angarita
