= Gustavo Herrera (politician) =

Venezuelan lawyer and diplomat (1890–1953)

151st Minister of Foreign Affairs of Venezuela
- In office 14 July 1945 – 18 October 1945
- President: Isaías Medina Angarita
- Preceded by: Caracciolo Parra Pérez
- Succeeded by: Carlos Morales

Personal details
- Born: 12 April 1890 Caracas, Venezuela
- Died: 1 February 1953 (aged 62) Caracas, Venezuela
- Profession: Lawyer, diplomat

Gustavo Herrera Grau (Caracas, 12 April 1890 – Caracas, 1 February 1953), was a Venezuelan lawyer and diplomat.

== Career ==
He served as Finance Minister in 1936, Plenipotentiary Minister of Venezuela in Netherlands and Germany, acting head of the Ministry of Foreign Affairs, Minister of Education, and Minister of Development in various presidential administrations. He was the Minister of Finance in 1936.

== See also ==
- Foreign relations of Venezuela
