= Isaías Medina Angarita =

President of Venezuela from 1941 to 1945

Isaías Medina
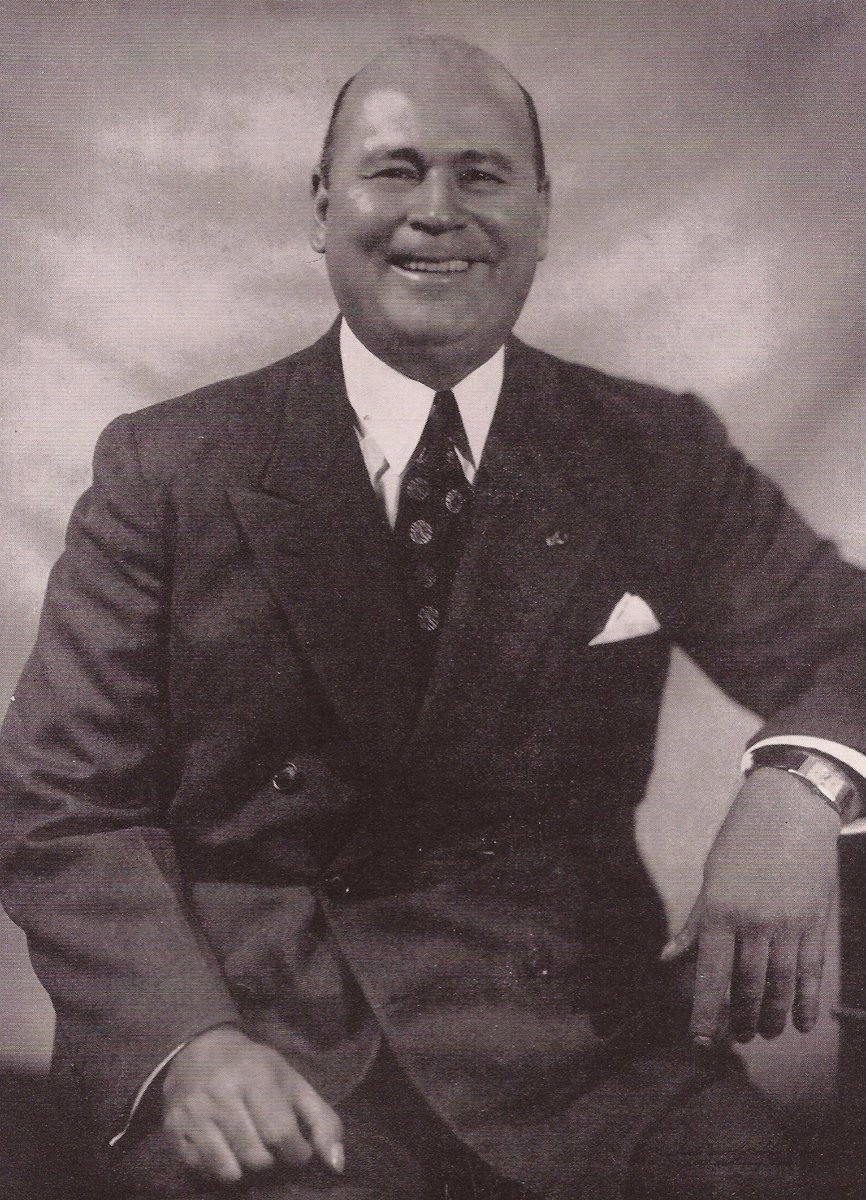
- Medina in 1941

37th President of Venezuela
- In office 5 May 1941 – 18 October 1945
- Preceded by: Eleazar López Contreras
- Succeeded by: Rómulo Betancourt

Minister of War and Navy
- In office 1 March 1936 – 4 May 1941

Personal details
- Born: 6 July 1897 San Cristóbal, Venezuela
- Died: 15 September 1953 (aged 56) Caracas, Venezuela
- Party: Venezuelan Democratic Party
- Spouse: Irma Felizola (1914–1994)
- Children: Irma Alejandrina Medina; María Angelina Medina; Diana Beatriz Medina; Isaías Enrique Medina; Isaías Medina Serfaty; Teresa Medina Serfaty

Military service
- Allegiance: Venezuela
- Branch/service: Venezuelan Army
- Years of service: 1914–1941
- Rank: General

Isaías Medina Angarita (6 July 1897 – 15 September 1953) was a Venezuelan military man and politician who served as President of Venezuela from 1941 until 1945, during World War II. He followed the path of his predecessor Eleazar López Contreras and contributed to gradual democratization and liberalization in Venezuela. He was overthrown in the 1945 Venezuelan coup d'état.

== Early life and education ==
Medina was born in San Cristóbal, Venezuela, and graduated from the Military academy of Venezuela in 1914.

== Early political career ==
He was a loyalist to Juan Vicente Gómez and Eleazar López Contreras.

He served as War Minister from 1936 to 1941 under Eleazar López Contreras.

== Presidency (1941–1945) ==
As a result of the indirect 1941 Venezuelan presidential election, he was appointed president by lawmakers of the Congress of Venezuela. He assumed the presidency on 5 May 1941.

In 1943, he founded the Venezuelan Democratic Party. He allowed other political parties to operate in Venezuela, including the Communist Party.

He took a firmer stance against oil companies, implementing higher exploitation taxes and higher royalties. Oil companies were no longer exempt from customs duties. He also promoted domestic oil refining.

He expanded the role of the state, using increased oil revenues to enact large public works and agricultural programs.

President Medina's visit to the U.S. in 1944.

Medina Angarita was the first Venezuelan president to travel abroad (in active office). First, in 1943 to the Bolivarian countries, Colombia, Ecuador, Peru, Bolivia and Panama, and in January 1944, the United States invited by Franklin Delano Roosevelt. The visit marked a milestone in the Venezuelan-US relations. Besides being the first time a Venezuelan president (in office) visited the United States, the time the journey was made was understood as an expression of the alliance of Venezuela with the Allies that fought the Axis. The US-Venezuela relationship was considered collaborative during Medina's presidency. During the administration of Medina, Venezuela established relations with China in 1943 and the Soviet Union in 1945.

Venezuela declared war on the Axis in 1945 in order to be part of the founding of the United Nations.

Some in the Army considered his presidential regime too liberal, while other political enemies accused him of being too conservative, and both sides were involved in a coup to remove him from power on 18 October 1945. The Medina government discovered the military's conspiracy to overthrow Medina and arrested Marcos Pérez Jiménez. The arrest triggered a popular revolt, leading Medina to give up power.

=== Medina's cabinet (1941–1945) ===
Ministries
OFFICE	NAME	TERM
President	Isaías Medina Angarita	1941–1945
Home Affairs	Tulio Chiossone	1941–1942
	César González	1942–1943
	Juan Penzini Hernández	1943
	José Nicomedes Rivas	1943–1945
	Arturo Uslar Pietri	1945
Outer Relations	Caracciolo Parra Pérez	1941–1945
	Gustavo Herrera	1945
Finance	Alfredo Machado Hernández	1941–1943
	Arturo Uslar Pietri	1943
	Rodolfo Rojas	1943–1945
	Alfonso Espinoza	1945
War and Navy	Antonio Chalbaud Cardona	1941–1942
	Juan de Dios Celis Paredes	1942–1943
	Carlos Meyer Baldo	1943
	Manuel Morán	1943–1945
	Delfín Becerra	1945
Development	Enrique Jorge Aguerrevere	1941–1942
	Eugenio Mendoza	1942–1943
	Gustavo Herrera	1943–1945
	Juan de Dios Celis Paredes	1945
Public Works	Manuel Silveira	1941–1945
Education	Alejandro Fuenmayor	1941
	Gustavo Herrera	1941–1943
Work and Communications	Numa Quevedo	1941
	Ovidio Pérez Ágreda	1941–1942
	Héctor Cuenca	1942–1943
	Julio Diez	1943–1945
Agriculture	Saverio Barbarito	1941
	Rodolfo Rojas	1941–1943
	Ángel Biagini	1943–1945
Health and Social Assistance	Félix Lairet	1941–1945
Secretary of the Presidency	Arturo Uslar Pietri	1941–1943
	Ángel Biagini	1943
	Arturo Uslar Pietri	1943
	Pedro Sotillo	1943–1945

== Post-presidency (1945–1953) ==
Medina died, aged 56, in Caracas.

== Personal life ==
Isaías Medina Angarita was married to Irma Felizola, who served as First Lady of Venezuela from 1941 to 1945.

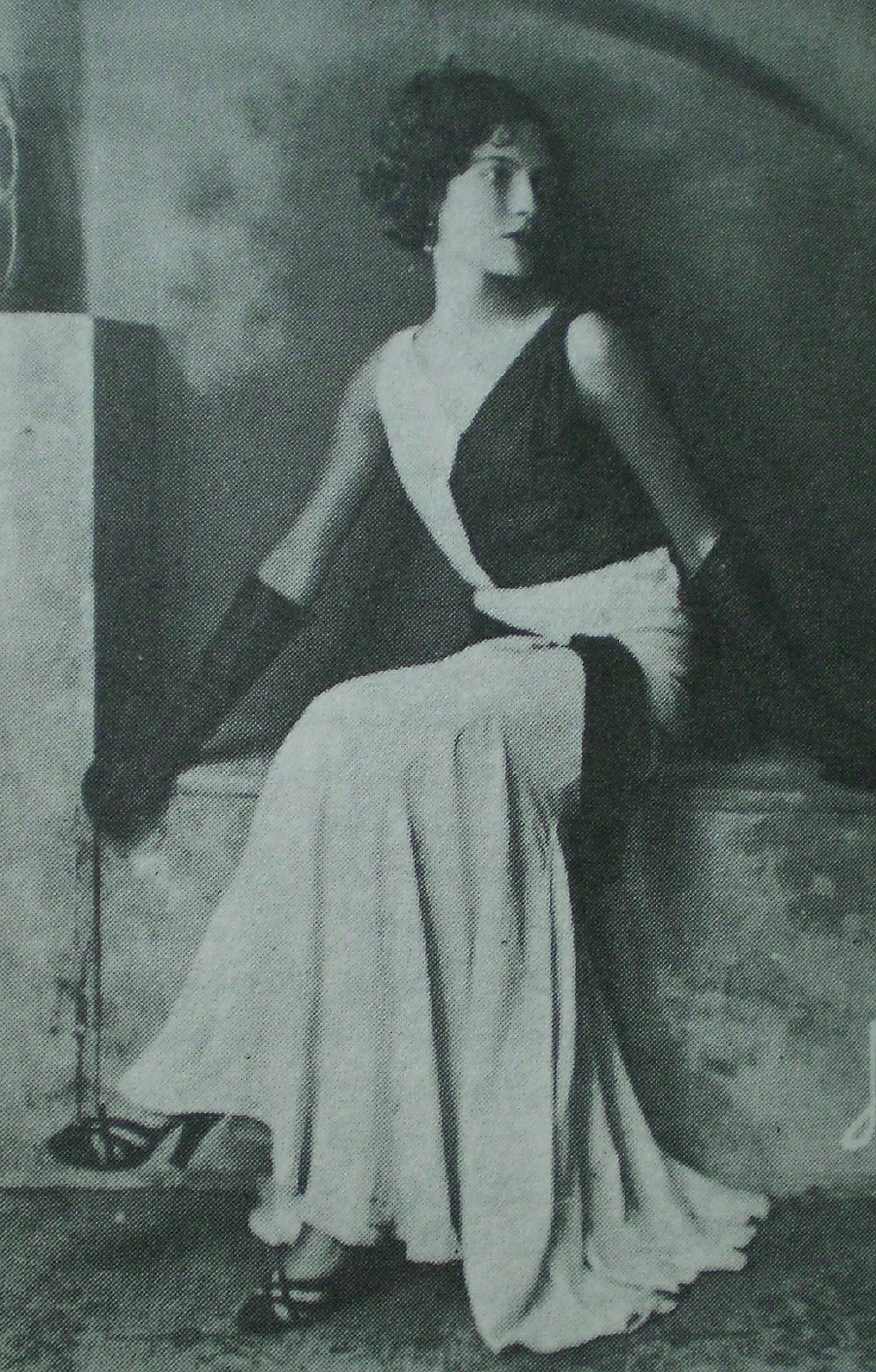
Irma Felizola

== See also ==
- Presidency of Isaías Medina Angarita
- Presidents of Venezuela

Political offices
Preceded by Eleazar López Contreras	President of Venezuela; 1941–1945	Succeeded by Rómulo Betancourt
