= Venezuelan Democratic Party =

Venezuelan Democratic Party Partido Democrático Venezolano
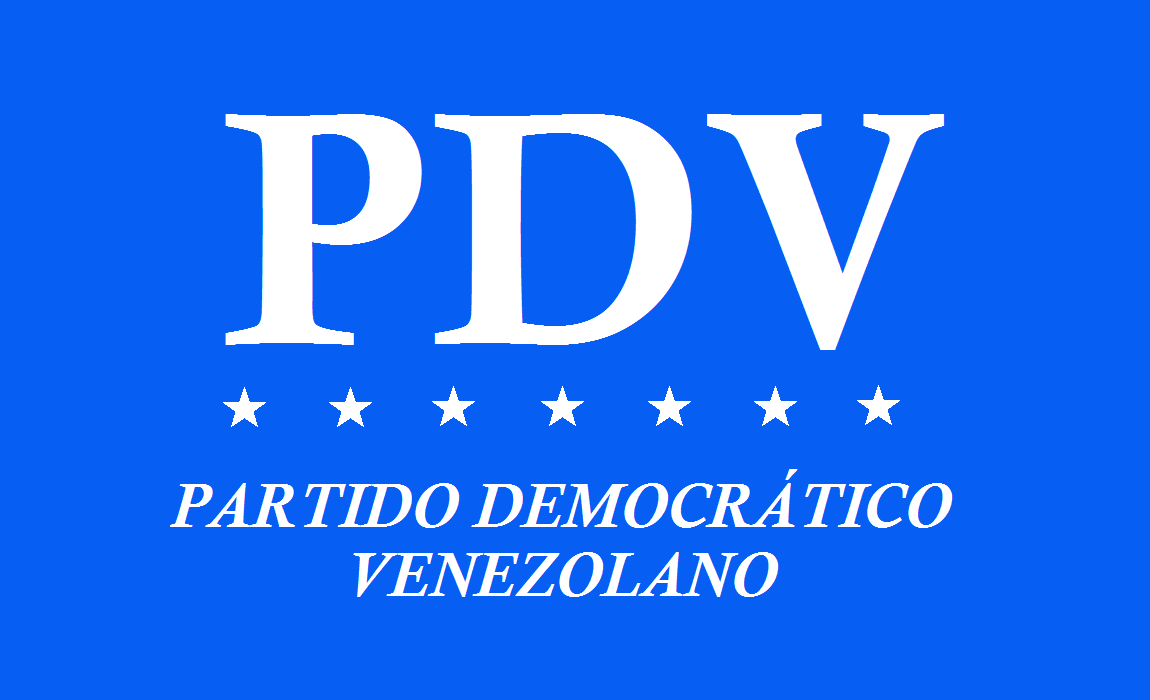
- President: Isaías Medina Angarita
- Founder: Isaías Medina Angarita
- Founded: 1943
- Dissolved: 1945
- Headquarters: Caracas, Venezuela
- Ideology: Conservatism; Economic liberalism Reformism
- Political position: Centre-right

Venezuelan Democratic Party (Spanish: Partido Democrático Venezolano, PDV) was a political party in Venezuela. It was created in September 1943 by President Isaías Medina Angarita to organize supporters of his government. Its dominant role in the political system ended with Rómulo Betancourt's 1945 coup.
