= History of Latin America–United States relations =

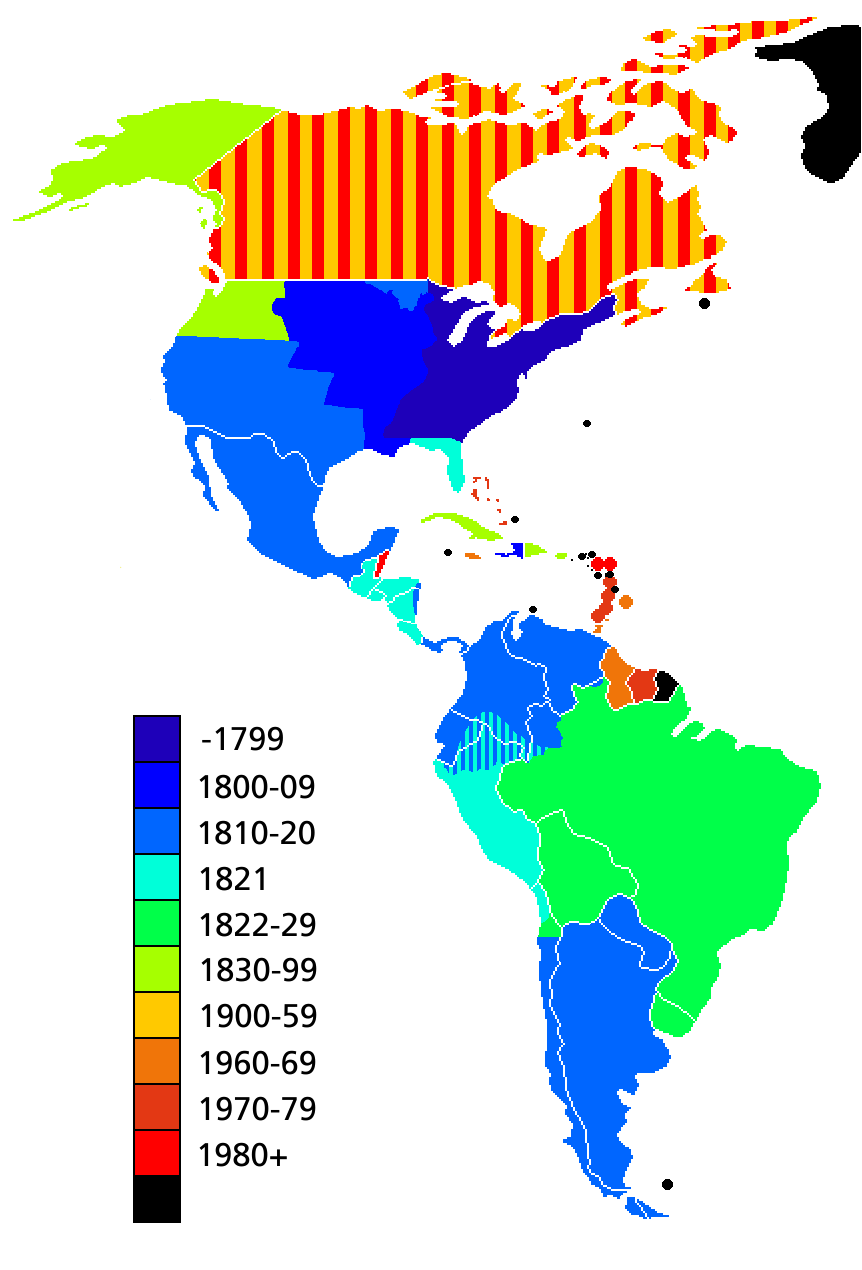
The timeline of decolonization in the Americas

The relationship between Latin America and the United States has been marked by periods of tension and cordiality.

== Post-American Revolution ==
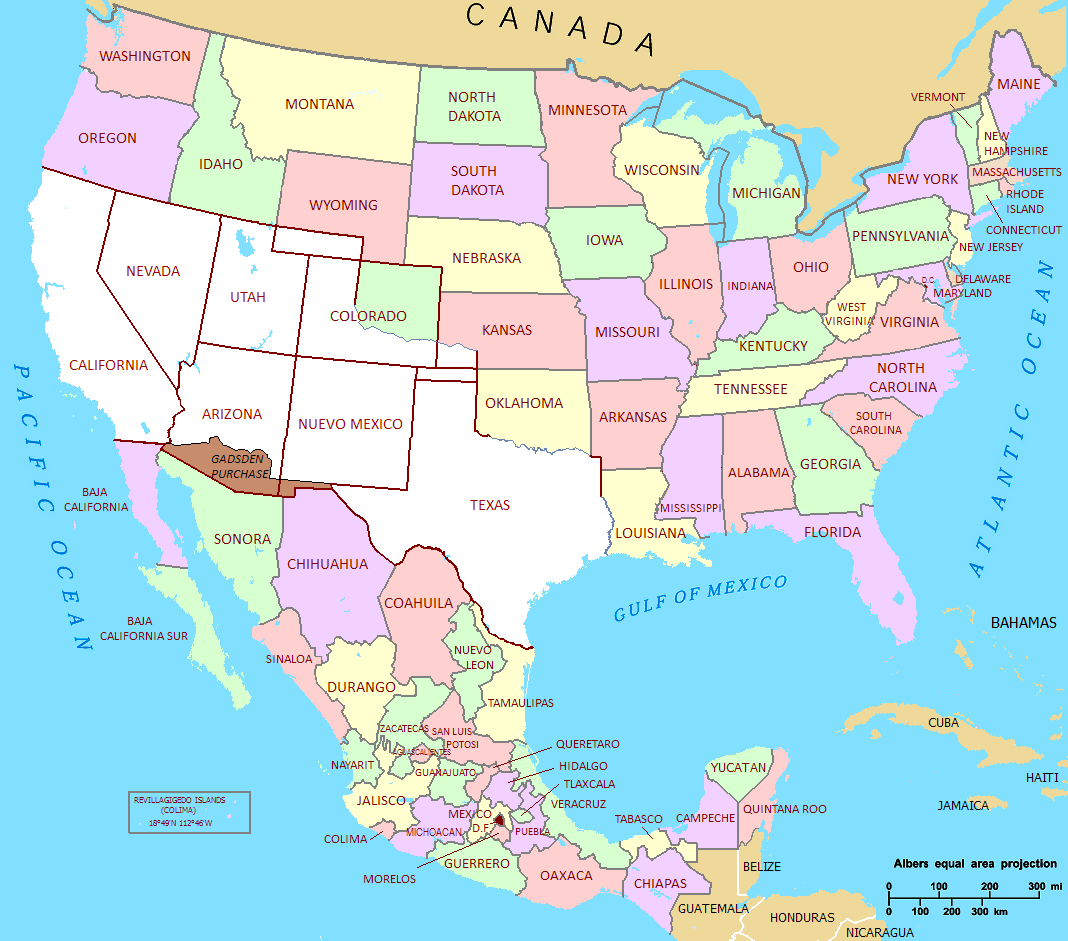
The Latin America–United States border shifted southward (affecting the white and brown areas) throughout the 19th century

=== Venezuelan independence ===
Following the events of the Revolution of April 19, 1810, the Captain General Vicente Emparán, designated by Joseph Bonaparte to govern the Captaincy General of Venezuela, were deposed by an expanded municipal government in Caracas that called itself the Supreme Junta to Preserve the Rights of Ferdinand VII (La Suprema Junta Conservadora de los Derechos de Fernando VII). One of the first acts of the Junta was to send a diplomatic mission to the United States to seek the recognition of the Supreme Junta of Caracas as the legitimate government of Venezuela in the absence of the King. Juan Vicente Bolívar Palacios, Jose Rafael Revenga and Telesforo Orea managed to attract the interest of the government of President James Madison to support the Supreme Junta.

=== Chilean independence ===
In 1811, the arrival of Joel Roberts Poinsett in Santiago de Chile marked the beginning of U.S. support for Chilean independence. He had been sent by President James Madison in 1809 as a special agent to the South American Spanish colonies to investigate the prospects of the revolutionaries in their struggle for independence from Spain.

=== Monroe Doctrine ===
The 1823 Monroe Doctrine, opposed additional European colonialism in the Western Hemisphere. It held that any intervention in the political affairs of the Americas by foreign powers was a potentially hostile act against the U.S. It also began Washington's policy of isolationism, stating it was necessary for the United States to refrain from entering into European affairs. The doctrine was central to U.S. foreign policy for much of the 19th and early 20th centuries. However some brief European interventions continued to occur in Latin American countries. These include the French naval blockade of Argentine ports between 1839 and 1840, the Anglo-French blockade of the River Plate from 1845 to 1850, the failed Spanish invasion of the Dominican Republic between 1861 and 1865, and the failed French intervention in Mexico between 1862 and 1865. In addition permanent intervention involved the re-establishment of British control over the Falkland Islands in 1833, and the Mosquito Coast in Nicaragua.

=== Anderson–Gual Treaty ===
The Anderson–Gual Treaty was an 1824 treaty between the United States and Gran Colombia (now the modern day countries of Venezuela, Colombia, Panama and Ecuador). It was the first bilateral treaty concluded by the United States with another American country. It was ratified by both countries and began enforcement in May 1825. The commercial provisions of the treaty granted reciprocal most-favored-nation status and were maintained despite the dissolution of Gran Colombia in 1830. The treaty contained a clause that stated it would be in force for 12 years after ratification by both parties; the treaty therefore expired in 1837.

=== Failed Congress of Panama, 1826 ===
The notion of an international union in the New World was first put forward by the Venezuelan Liberator Simón Bolívar. At the 1826 Congress of Panama he proposed a league of all American republics with a common military, a mutual defense pact and a supranational parliamentary assembly. Bolívar's dream of Latin American unity was meant to unify Latin American nations against external powers, including the United States. The meeting was attended by representatives of Gran Colombia, Peru, Bolivia, the United Provinces of Central America, and Mexico. However the grandly titled "Treaty of Union, League, and Perpetual Confederation" was ultimately ratified only by Gran Colombia. The United States' delegates to the Congress were delayed; one died en route to Panama, and the other (John Sergeant) arrived after the Congress had concluded. In the meantime, several European nations had managed to negotiate trade deals with newly-independent Latin American nations ahead of the United States. Bolívar's dream soon foundered, with civil war in Gran Colombia, the disintegration of Central America and the emergence of national, rather than New World, outlooks in the newly independent American republics.

=== Mexican–American War and Second French intervention in Mexico ===
Overview map of the Mexican–American War

Texas, settled primarily by Anglo-Americans, fought a successful war of independence against Mexico in 1836. Mexico refused to recognize the independence and warned that annexation to the United States meant war. The U.S. annexation of Texas occurred in 1845; predictably, war followed annexation in 1846. Due to an ambush, the American military was triumphant. As a result of the capture of Antonio Lopez de Santa Anna, the president of Mexico at the time, the United States was now able to purchase New Mexico, Arizona, California, and adjacent areas. About 60,000 Mexicans remained in the new territories and became US citizens. In 1862, French forces under Napoleon III invaded and conquered Mexico, giving control to the monarch Emperor Maximilian I. Washington denounced this as a violation of the Monroe Doctrine, but was unable to intervene because of the American Civil War. In 1865, the United States stationed a large combat army on the border to emphasize its demand that France leave. France did pull out and Mexican nationalists executed Maximilian.

=== Ostend Manifesto ===
The Ostend Manifesto of 1854 was a proposal circulated by American diplomats that proposed the United States offer to purchase Cuba from Spain, while implying that the U.S. should declare war if Spain refused. Nothing came of it. Diplomatically, the US was content to see the island remain in Spanish hands so long as it did not pass to a stronger power such as Britain or France.

== Post-American Civil War ==
=== War of the Pacific (1879–1883) ===
The United States tried to bring an early end to the War of the Pacific in 1879, mainly because of US business interests in Peru, but also because American leaders were worried that the British government would take economic control of the region through Chile. Peace negotiations failed when a stipulation required Chile to return the conquered lands. Chileans suspected the new US initiative was tainted with a pro-Peruvian bias. As a result, relations between Chile and the United States took a turn for the worse.

=== Big Brother policy ===
US Secretary of State, James G. Blaine, created the Big Brother policy in the 1880s, aiming to rally Latin American nations behind US leadership and to open Latin American markets to U.S. traders. Blaine served as United States Secretary of State in 1881 in the cabinet of President James Garfield and again from 1889 to 1892 in the cabinet of President Benjamin Harrison. As part of the policy, Blaine arranged for and lead as the first president the First International Conference of American States in 1889. Blaine went on to live for a few years in Mexico following his success in their relations.

=== Venezuelan crisis of 1895 ===
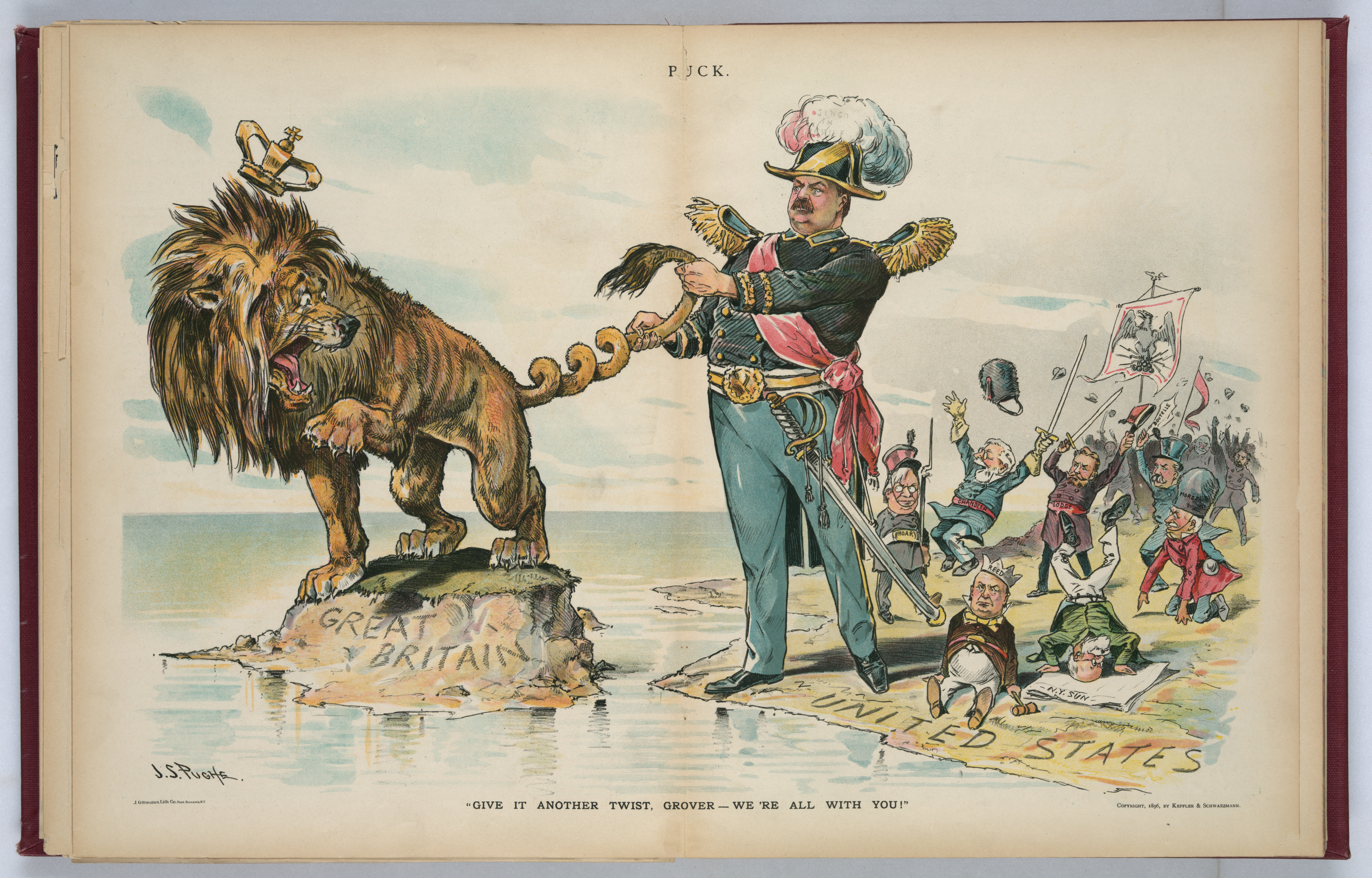
President Cleveland twists the tail of the British Lion, cartoon in Puck by J.S. Pughe, 1895

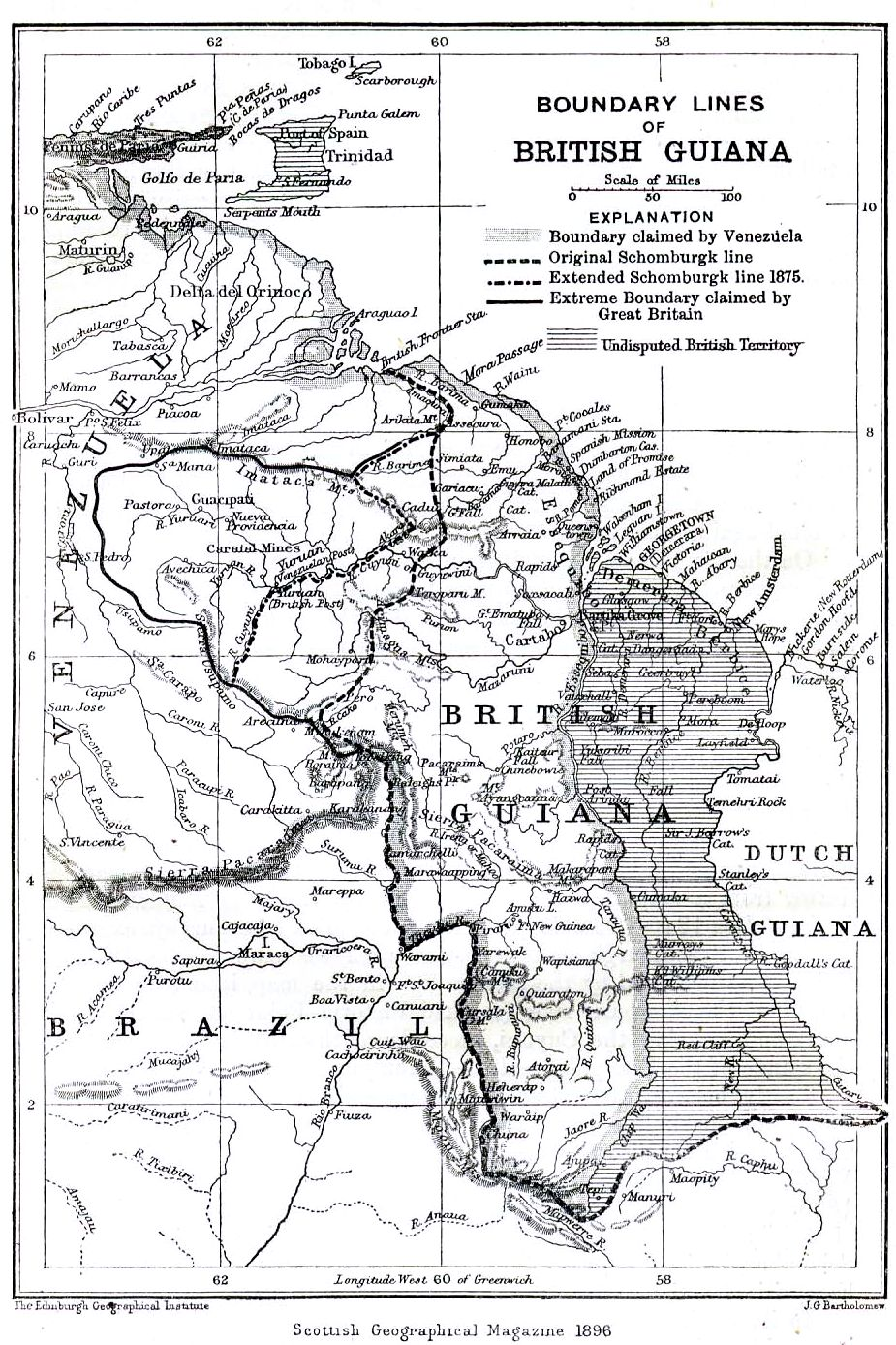
Map showing:* The extreme border claimed by Britain* The current boundary (roughly) and * The extreme border claimed by Venezuela

The Venezuelan crisis of 1895 (Note: Sometimes called the "first Venezuelan crisis", the crisis of 1902–03 being the second.) occurred over Venezuela's longstanding dispute with the United Kingdom about the territory of Essequibo, which Britain claimed as part of British Guiana and Venezuela saw as Venezuelan territory. As the dispute became a crisis, the key issue became the British government's refusal to include the territory east of the "Schomburgk Line", in the proposed international arbitration, which a surveyor had drawn half a century earlier as a boundary between Venezuela and the former Dutch territory of Surinam. By December 17, 1895, President Grover Cleveland delivered an address to the United States Congress reaffirming the Monroe Doctrine and its relevance to the dispute. The crisis ultimately saw the British Prime Minister, Lord Salisbury, accept the United States' intervention to force arbitration of the entire disputed territory and tacitly accept the United States' right to intervene under the Monroe doctrine. A tribunal convened in Paris in 1898 to decide the matter, and in 1899, awarded the bulk of the disputed territory to British Guiana. For the first time, the Anglo-Venezuelan boundary dispute asserted a more outward-looking American foreign policy, particularly in the Americas, marking the United States as a world power.

=== Spanish–American War (1898) ===
The Spanish–American War was a conflict fought between Spain and the United States in 1898. Hostilities began in the aftermath of the sinking of the USS Maine in Havana harbor, leading to American intervention in the Cuban War of Independence. The sinking of the USS Maine occurred on February 15, resulting in the deaths of 266 people and causing the United States to blame Spain, since the ship had been sent to Havana to protect a community of U.S. citizens there. American acquisition of Spain's Pacific possessions led to its involvement in the Philippine Revolution and ultimately in the Philippine–American War.

Revolts against Spanish rule had been occurring for some years in Cuba as is demonstrated by the Virginius Affair in 1873. In the late 1890s, journalists Joseph Pulitzer and William Randolph Hearst which used yellow journalism, anti-Spanish propaganda, to agitate U.S. public opinion and encourage war. However, the Hearst and Pulitzer papers circulated among the working class in New York City and did not reach a national audience.

After the mysterious sinking of the US Navy battleship Maine in Havana Harbor, political pressures from the Democratic Party pushed the administration of Republican President William McKinley into a war he had wished to avoid. Spain promised time and again that it would reform, but never delivered. The United States sent an ultimatum to Spain demanding it surrender control of Cuba. First Madrid, then Washington, formally declared war.

Although the main issue was Cuban independence, the ten-week war was fought in both the Caribbean and the Pacific. US naval power proved decisive, allowing expeditionary forces to disembark in Cuba against a Spanish garrison already facing nationwide Cuban insurgent attacks and further wasted by yellow fever. Numerically superior Cuban, Philippine and US forces obtained the surrender of Santiago de Cuba and Manila despite the good performance of some Spanish infantry units and fierce fighting for positions such as San Juan Hill. With two obsolete Spanish squadrons sunk in Santiago de Cuba and Manila Bay and a third, more modern fleet recalled home to protect the Spanish coasts, Madrid sued for peace.

The result was the 1898 Treaty of Paris, negotiated on terms favorable to the U.S., which allowed temporary U.S. control of Cuba and ceded ownership of Puerto Rico, Guam, and the Philippine islands. The cession of the Philippines involved payment of $20 million ($774,000,000 today) to Spain by the US to cover infrastructure owned by Spain.

The war began exactly fifty-two years after the beginning of the Mexican–American War. It was one of only five out of twelve US wars (against a total of eleven sovereign states) to have been formally declared by Congress.

=== Venezuelan crisis of 1902–1903 ===
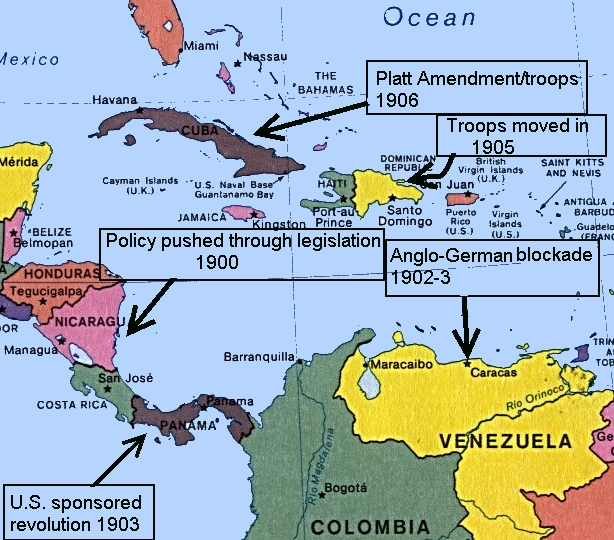
A map of Middle America, showing the places affected by U.S. interventions

The Venezuelan crisis of 1902–03 was a naval blockade imposed against Venezuela by Britain, Germany and Italy and lasted from December 1902 to February 1903. The blockade was a result of President Cipriano Castro's refusal to pay foreign debts and damages suffered by European citizens in the recent Venezuelan Federal War. Castro assumed that the United States' Monroe Doctrine would see the US prevent European military intervention. The blockade quickly disabled Venezuela's small navy, but Castro refused to give in. Instead, he agreed in principle to submit some of the claims to international arbitration, which he had previously rejected. Germany initially objected to this, particularly because it felt some claims should be accepted by Venezuela without arbitration.

U.S. President Theodore Roosevelt forced the blockading nations to back down by sending his own larger fleet under Admiral George Dewey and threatening war if the Germans landed. With Castro failing to back down, increased U.S. and British pressure, and American press reaction to the affair, the blockading nations agreed to a compromise. However, the blockade remained during negotiations over the details of the compromise. The Washington Protocols agreement was signed on February 13, 1903. The agreement lifted the blockade and obligated Venezuela commit 30% of its customs duties to settling claims. When the Permanent Court of Arbitration in The Hague subsequently awarded preferential treatment to the blockading powers against the claims of other nations, the U.S. feared this would encourage future European intervention. This incident was a major driver of the Roosevelt Corollary and the subsequent U.S. Big Stick policy and Dollar Diplomacy in Latin America.

=== Platt Amendment ===
On March 2, 1901, the Platt Amendment was passed as part of the 1901 Army Appropriations Bill. It stipulated seven conditions for the withdrawal of United States troops remaining in Cuba at the end of the Spanish–American War and an eighth condition that Cuba sign a treaty accepting these seven conditions. The amendment defined the terms of Cuban and U.S. relations to essentially be an unequal, with U.S. dominance over Cuba. On December 25, 1901, Cuba amended its constitution to contain the text of the Platt Amendment. On May 22, 1903, Cuba entered into a treaty with the United States to allow the United States to intervene unilaterally in Cuban affairs and a pledge to lease land to the United States for naval bases on the island as Guantanamo.

=== Panama Canal ===
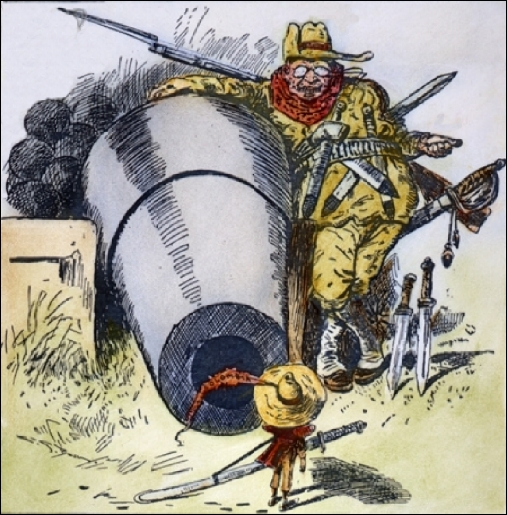
1903 cartoon, "Go Away, Little Man, and Don't Bother Me", depicts President Roosevelt intimidating Colombia to acquire the Canal Zone

Theodore Roosevelt, who became President of the United States in 1901, believed that a U.S.-controlled canal across Central America was a vital strategic interest to the United States. This idea gained wide impetus following the destruction of the battleship USS Maine in Cuba on February 15, 1898. The USS Oregon, a battleship stationed in San Francisco, was dispatched to take her place, but the voyage—around Cape Horn—took 67 days. Although she was in time to join in the Battle of Santiago Bay, the voyage would have taken just three weeks via Panama. A voyage through a canal in Panama or Nicaragua would have reduced travel time by 60–65% and shortened the travel to 20–25 days.

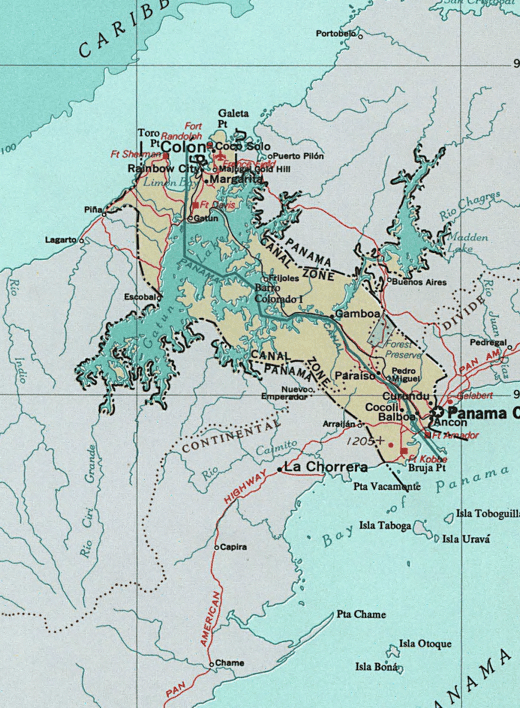
The Panama Canal Zone, which was established on shaky legal grounds, bisected Panama and led to incidents such as Martyrs' Day and the United States invasion of Panama.

Roosevelt was able to reverse a previous decision by the Walker Commission in favour of a Nicaragua Canal and pushed through the acquisition of the French Panama Canal effort. Panama was then part of Colombia, so Roosevelt opened negotiations with the Colombians to obtain the necessary permission. In early 1903, the Hay–Herrán Treaty was signed by both nations, but the Colombian Senate failed to ratify the treaty.

Controversially, Roosevelt implied to Panamanian rebels that if they revolted, the U.S. Navy would assist their cause for independence. Panama proceeded to proclaim its independence on November 3, 1903, and the USS Nashville in local waters impeded any interference from Colombia.

The victorious Panamanians returned the favor to Roosevelt by allowing the United States control of the Panama Canal Zone on February 23, 1904, for US$10,000,000 (as provided in the Hay–Bunau-Varilla Treaty, signed on November 18, 1903).

=== Roosevelt Corollary ===
When the Venezuelan government under Cipriano Castro was no longer able to placate the demands of European bankers in 1902, naval forces from Britain, Italy, and Germany erected a blockade along the Venezuelan coast and even fired upon coastal fortifications. The U.S. president Theodore Roosevelt's concern with the threat of penetration into the region by Germany and the increasingly negative British and American press reactions to the affair led to the blockading nations agreement to a compromise. The blockade was maintained during negotiations over the details of refinacial the debt on Washington Protocols.

The U.S. president then formulated the Roosevelt Corollary to the Monroe Doctrine, in December 1904, which asserted the right of the United States to intervene in Latin American nations' affairs.

Roosevelt first used the Corollary to act in the Dominican Republic in 1904, which at the time was severely indebted and becoming a failed state.

=== Taft and Dollar Diplomacy ===
From 1909 to 1913, President William Howard Taft and Secretary of State Philander C. Knox followed a foreign policy characterized as "dollar diplomacy." Taft shared the view held by Knox (a corporate lawyer who had founded the giant conglomerate U.S. Steel) that the goal of diplomacy should be to create stability abroad and, through this stability, promote American commercial interests. Knox felt that not only was the goal of diplomacy to improve financial opportunities, but also to use private capital to further U.S. interests overseas. "Dollar diplomacy" was evident in extensive U.S. interventions in Cuba, Central America and Venezuela, especially in measures undertaken by the United States government to safeguard American financial interests in the region. During the presidency of Juan Vicente Gómez, Venezuela provided a very favorable atmosphere for U.S. activities, as at that time petroleum was discovered under Lake Maracaibo basin in 1914. Gómez managed to deflate Venezuela's staggering debt by granting concessions to foreign oil companies, which won him the support of the United States and the European powers. The growth of the domestic oil industry strengthened the economic ties between the U.S. and Venezuela.

=== Mexican Revolution (1910–1920) ===
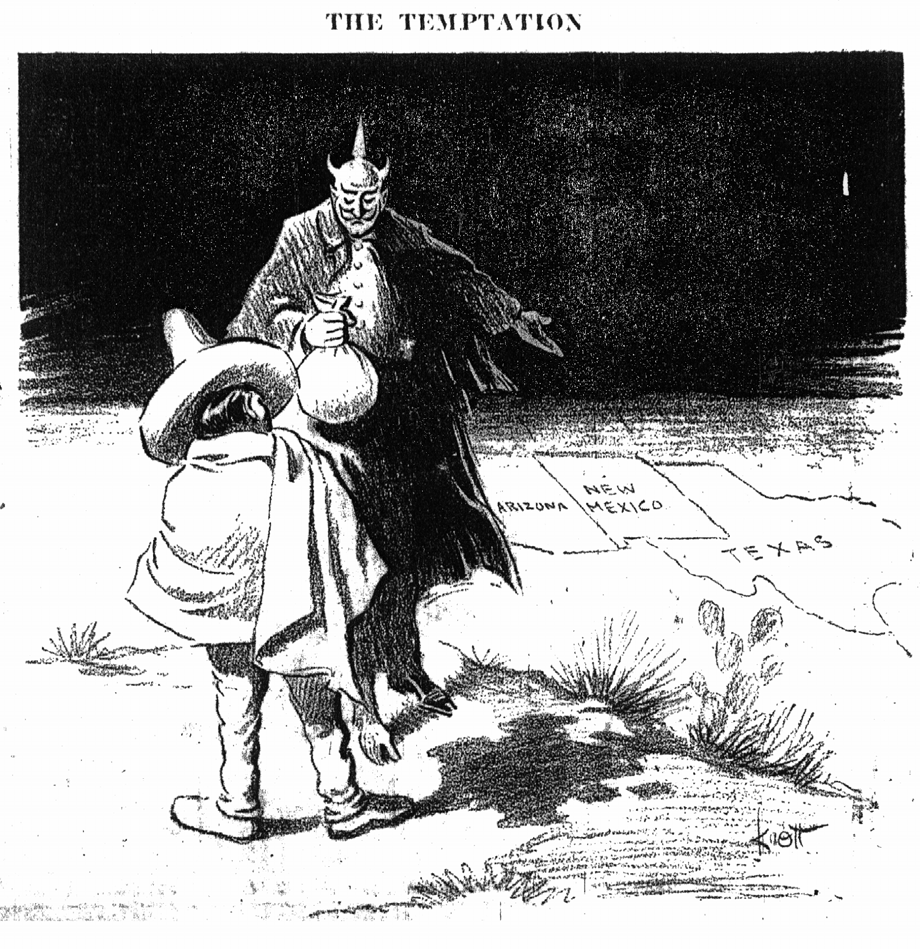
1917 political cartoon about the Zimmermann Telegram published in the Dallas Morning News

The United States appears to have pursued an inconsistent policy toward Mexico during the Mexican Revolution, but in fact it was the pattern for U.S. diplomacy. "Every victorious faction between 1910 and 1919 enjoyed the sympathy, and in most cases the direct support of U.S. authorities in its struggle for power. In each case, the administration in Washington soon turned on its new friends with the same vehemence it had initially expressed in supporting them." The U.S. turned against the regimes it helped install when they began pursuing policies counter to U.S. diplomatic and business interests.

The U.S. sent troops to the border with Mexico when it became clear in March 1911 that the regime of Porfirio Díaz could not control revolutionary violence. Díaz resigned, opening the way for free elections that brought Francisco I. Madero to the presidency in November 1911. The U.S. ambassador to Mexico, Henry Lane Wilson, conspired with opposition forces to topple Madero's regime in February 1913, during what is known as the Ten Tragic Days.

The U.S. intervened in Mexico twice under the Presidency of Woodrow Wilson. The first time was the United States occupation of Veracruz by the Navy in 1914. The second time, the U.S. mounted a punitive operation in northern Mexico in the Pancho Villa Expedition, aimed at capturing the northern revolutionary who had attacked Columbus, New Mexico.

=== Banana Wars ===
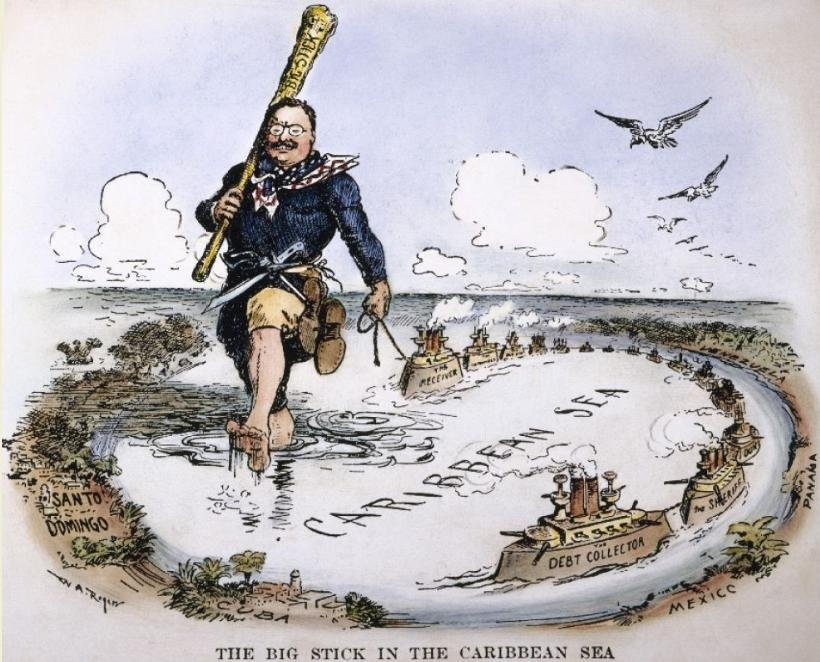
William Allen Rogers's 1904 cartoon recreates the Big Stick ideology as an episode in Gulliver's Travels

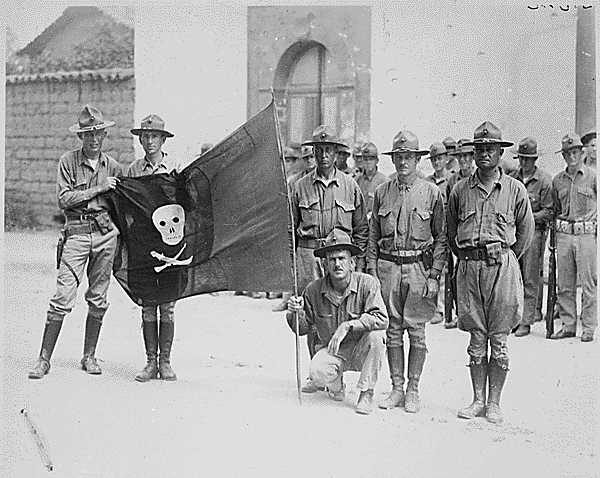
US Marines with the captured flag of Augusto César Sandino in Nicaragua in 1932.

At the end of the 19th century and the beginning of the 20th century, the US carried on several military interventions under principles of Big Stick policy in what became known as the Banana Wars. The term arose from the connections between the interventions and the preservation of US commercial interests. An example is the United Fruit corporation, which had significant financial stakes in production of bananas, tobacco, sugar cane, and various other agricultural products throughout the Caribbean, Central America and the northern portions of South America. US citizens advocating imperialism in the pre–World War I era often argued that these conflicts helped central and South Americans by aiding in stability. Some imperialists argued that these limited interventions did not serve US interests sufficiently and argued for expanded actions in the region. Anti-imperialists argued that these actions were a first step down a slippery slope towards US colonialism in the region.

Some modern observers have argued that if World War I had not lessened American enthusiasm for international activity these interventions might have led to the formation of an expanded U.S. colonial empire, with Central American states either annexed into statehood like Hawaii or becoming American territories, like the Philippines, Puerto Rico and Guam. However, this view is heavily disputed, especially as, after a decrease in activity during and after World War I, the U.S. government intervened again in the 1920s while again stating that no colonial ambitions were held. The Banana Wars ended with the 1933 Good Neighbor Policy of President Franklin D. Roosevelt; no official American colonies had been created.

The countries involved in the Banana Wars include:

- Cuba – Sometimes not counted among the banana wars, as the Platt Amendment granted the United States the right to militarily intervene on any occasion in which Cuba's independence was threatened
- Dominican Republic
- Honduras
- Haiti
- Nicaragua
- Colombia
- Panama

Though many other countries in the region may have been influenced or dominated by American banana or other companies, there is no history of U.S. military intervention during this period in those countries.

=== 1930s ===
The Great Depression made overseas military expeditions too costly for the U.S. In January 1931, Henry Stimson, then Secretary of State, announced that all U.S. soldiers in Nicaragua would be withdrawn following the 1932 election in the country. The Good Neighbor policy was the foreign policy of newly elected American president Franklin Roosevelt toward the countries of Latin America. The United States wished to improve relations with its Latin American neighbors in a time of increasing international conflict. Giving up unpopular military intervention, the United States implemented its policy of Pan-Americanism to maintain its influence. This policy supported strong domestic leaders, the training of national guards, economic and cultural penetration, Export-Import Bank loans, financial supervision, and political subversion. The Good Neighbor Policy meant that the United States would keep its eye on Latin America in a more peaceful manner. On March 4, 1933, Roosevelt stated during his inaugural address that: "In the field of world policy I would dedicate this nation to the policy of the good neighbor—the neighbor who resolutely respects himself and, because he does so, respects the rights of others." This position was affirmed by Cordell Hull, Roosevelt's Secretary of State, at a conference of American states in Montevideo in December 1933. Hull endorsed the resolution, "No country has the right to intervene in the internal or external affairs of another." In December 1933 Roosevelt stated, "The definite policy of the United States from now on is one opposed to armed intervention."

=== World War II ===
President Roosevelt's policy after 1939 was to pay special attention to Latin America, to fend off German influence, to build a united front on behalf of the war effort, and then to win support for the United Nations. Only Brazil contributed significant numbers of men to fight. British intelligence knew about Roosevelt's fears and exploited them in 1941 by producing a fake map that indicated German plans for taking over South America. Roosevelt's appointment of young Nelson Rockefeller to head the new, well-funded Office of the Coordinator of Inter-American Affairs provided energetic leadership; in practice Rockefeller reported to Roosevelt and largely ignored the State Department. Anti-fascist propaganda was a major project across Latin America, and was run by Rockefeller's office. It spent millions on radio broadcasts and motion pictures, hoping to reach a large audience. Madison Avenue techniques generated a push back in Mexico, especially, where well-informed locals resisted heavy-handed American influence. Nevertheless, Mexico was a valuable ally in the war. A deal was reached whereby 250,000 Mexican citizens living in the United States served in the American forces; over 1000 were killed in combat. In addition to propaganda, large sums were allocated for economic support and development. On the whole the Roosevelt policy was a political success, except in Argentina, which tolerated German influence, and refused to follow Washington's lead until the war was practically over.

==== Expulsion of Germans ====
After the United States declared war on Germany in December 1941, the Federal Bureau of Investigation drafted a list of Germans in fifteen Latin American countries it suspected of subversive activities and demanded their eviction to the U.S. for detention. In response, several countries expelled a total of 4,058 Germans to the U.S. Some 10% to 15% of them were Nazi party members, including some dozen recruiters for the Nazis' overseas arm and eight people suspected of espionage. Also among them were 81 Jewish Germans who had only recently fled persecution in Nazi Germany. The bulk were ordinary Germans who were residents in the Latin American states for years or decades. Some were expelled because corrupt Latin American officials took the opportunity to seize their property or ordinary Latin Americans were after the financial reward that U.S. intelligence paid informants. Argentina, Brazil, Chile and Mexico did not participate in the U.S. expulsion program.

== Contemporary era ==
=== 1940s–1960s: The Cold War and the "Hemispheric Defense" Doctrine ===
Most Latin Americans have seen their neighbor to the north (the United States) growing richer; they have seen the elite elements in their own societies growing richer – but the man in the street or on the land in Latin America today still lives the hand-to-mouth existence of his great, great grandfather... They are less and less happy with situations in which, to cite one example, 40 percent of the land is owned by 1 percent of the people, and in which, typically, a very thin upper crust lives in grandeur while most others live in squalor.

— U.S. Senator J. William Fulbright, in a speech to Congress on United States policy in Latin America

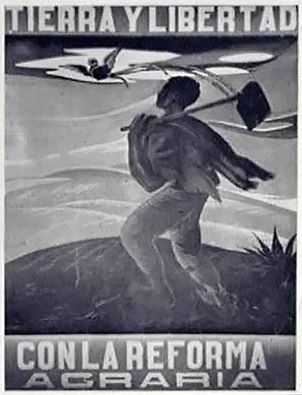
When democratically elected Guatemalan President Jacobo Árbenz attempted a modest redistribution of land, he was overthrown in the 1954 CIA Guatemalan coup d'état

It officially started in 1947 with the Truman Doctrine theorizing the "containment" policy, the Cold War had important consequences in Latin America. Latin America was considered by the United States to be a full part of the Western Bloc, called "free world", in contrast with the Eastern Bloc, a division born with the end of World War II and the Yalta Conference held in February 1945. It "must be the policy of the United States", Truman declared, "to support free peoples who are resisting attempted subjugation by armed minorities or outside pressures." Truman rallied to spend $400 million to intervene in the Greek Civil War, while the CIA (created by the National Security Act of 1947) intervention in Greece was its first act in its infancy. By aiding Greece, Truman set a precedent for U.S. aid to regimes, no matter how repressive and corrupt, that requested help to fight communists. Washington began to sign a series of defense treaties with countries all over the world, including the North Atlantic Treaty of 1949, which created NATO, and the ANZUS in 1951 with Australia and New Zealand. Moscow responded to NATO and to the Marshall Plan in Europe with a plan which included the creation of the COMECON economic treaty and the Warsaw Pact defense alliance, as well as gathering Eastern Europe countries which had fallen under its sphere of influence. After the Berlin Blockade by the Soviet Union, the Korean War (1950–1953) was one of the first conflicts of the Cold War, while the US succeeded France in the counter-revolutionary war against Viet-minh in Indochina.

In Latin America itself, the US defense treaty was the Inter-American Treaty of Reciprocal Assistance (aka Rio Treaty or TIAR) of 1947, known as the "hemispheric defense" treaty. It was the formalization of the Act of Chapultepec, adopted at the Inter-American Conference on the Problems of War and Peace in 1945 in Mexico City. The U.S. had maintained a hemispheric defense policy under the Monroe Doctrine and, during the 1930s, had been alarmed by Axis overtures toward military cooperation with Latin American governments, in particular apparent strategic threats against the Panama Canal. During the war, Washington had been able to secure Allied support from all individual governments except Uruguay, which remained neutral, and wished to make those commitments permanent. With the exceptions of Trinidad and Tobago (1967), Belize (1981) and the Bahamas (1982), no countries that became independent after 1947 have joined the treaty.

In April 1948, the Organization of American States (OAS) was created during the Ninth International Conference of American States held in Bogotá and led by U.S. Secretary of State George Marshall. Member states pledged to fight communism on the American continent. Twenty-one American countries signed the Charter of the Organization of American States on April 30, 1948.

Operation PBSuccess, which overthrew the democratically elected president of Guatemala, (Jacobo Arbenz Guzmán) in 1954, was to be one of the first in a long series of US interventions in Latin America during the Cold War. It immediately followed the 1953 overthrow of Iranian Prime Minister Mohammad Mossadegh.

Background: Arbenz pursued an ambitious social program that focused on income distribution and economic nationalism. President Arbenz created the first income tax in Guatemala and tried to break monopolies by creating governmental competition. This included agrarian land reform, which meant expropriating over 400,000 acres of land from the United Fruit Company (A US-based, banana production firm). The Guatemalan government determined that the lands had a monetary value of $1,185,000, while the United Fruit Company protested, claiming that the lands' true value was $19,355,000. The central disagreement came from the fact that the Guatemalan government did not place much value on the lands because they were not immediately being used for production. The United Fruit Company countered by arguing that they needed extra acres to avoid soil exhaustion, and to keep the plantations separated to avoid dissemination of plant disease. This conflict led to increasing tensions and arguments between President Arbenz, the United Fruit Company and the US State Department. In the end, the Eisenhower administration responded by approving a secret operation to overthrow Arbenz using some Guatemalan rebel forces stationed in Honduras. Part of the rationale for this measure was that the administration had come to view Arbenz as a communist threat. As would later be the case in conflicts with Cuba, Nicaragua, and other Latin American nations, the potential threat of lurking Communism was more than enough justification for intervention. Ultimately, the rebel forces removed Arbenz from power, nullified his reforms, and United Fruit got their expropriated lands back.

Also, the Inter-American Development Bank was established in 1959.

In June 1960 the Organization of American States' Human Rights Commission issued a scathing report on violations in the Dominican Republic. Supported by the U.S. State Department, the commission accused the dictator Rafael Trujillo of flagrant and numerous violations of human rights against the citizens of the Dominican Republic. Trujillo retaliated against the chief proponent of the report, Venezuelan President Romulo Betancourt, by actively supporting an assassination attempt. The plot failed and Trujillo's involvement in the conspiracy became public in a report by the OAS Council's (the organization's general assembly) investigating committee. Composed of representatives from the United States, Argentina, Mexico, Panama, and Uruguay, the committee verified Dominican complicity and placed responsibility on "high officials" within the government. Responding to a Venezuelan call for collective action, on August 20, 1960, the OAS Council passed a resolution invoking diplomatic and economic sanctions against the Trujillo government. The resolution, passed fourteen to one (the Dominican Republic dissented while Brazil, Argentina, Guatemala, Haiti, Paraguay, and Uruguay abstained), marked the first time that the organization had taken such actions against a member nation. As a show of support, President Dwight D. Eisenhower suspended all economic and diplomatic relations with the Dominican Republic.

Trujillo was assassinated on May 31, 1961, by a small band of conspirators led by Antonio de la Maza and Antonio Imbert Barrera. The coup attempt that followed failed to seize power and all of the conspirators except Imbert were found and executed by Ramfis Trujillo, the dictator's son, who remained in de facto control of the government for the next six months through his position as commander of the armed forces. Trujillo's brothers, Hector Bienvenido and Jose Arismendi Trujillo, returned to the country and began immediately to plot against President Balaguer. On November 18, 1961, as a planned coup became more evident, U.S. Secretary of State Dean Rusk issued a warning that the United States would not "remain idle" if the Trujillos attempted to "reassert dictatorial domination" over the Dominican Republic. Following this warning, and the arrival of a fourteen-vessel U.S. naval task force within sight of Santo Domingo, Ramfis and his uncles fled the country on November 19 with $200 million from the Dominican treasury.

=== 1960s: Cuban Revolution ===
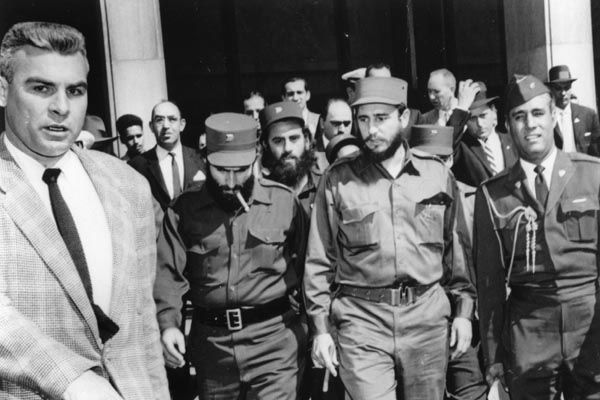
Fidel Castro during a visit to Washington, D.C., shortly after the Cuban Revolution in 1959

The 1959 Cuban Revolution, headed by Fidel Castro, was one of the first defeats of the US foreign policy in Latin America. In 1961, Cuba became a member of the newly created Non-Aligned Movement, which succeeded the 1955 Bandung Conference. After the implementation of several economic reforms, including complete nationalizations by Cuba's government, US trade restrictions on Cuba increased. The U.S. halted Cuban sugar imports, on which Cuba's economy depended the most. Additionally, the U.S. refused to supply its former trading partner with much needed oil, creating a devastating effect on the island's economy. In March 1960, tensions increased when the freighter La Coubre exploded in Havana harbor, killing over 75 people. Fidel Castro blamed the United States and compared the incident to the 1898 sinking of the USS Maine, which had precipitated the Spanish–American War; he could provide no evidence for his accusation. That same month, President Dwight D. Eisenhower authorized the CIA to organize, train and equip Cuban refugees as a guerrilla force to overthrow Castro, which would lead to the failed 1961 Bay of Pigs invasion authorized by president John F. Kennedy.

We (the U.S.) have not only supported a dictatorship in Cuba – we have propped up dictators in Venezuela, Argentina, Colombia, Paraguay and the Dominican Republic. We not only ignored poverty and distress in Cuba – we have failed in the past eight years to relieve poverty and distress throughout the hemisphere.
– President John F. Kennedy, October 6, 1960

Every time the Cuban government nationalized US properties, the US government took countermeasures, resulting in the prohibition of all exports to Cuba on October 19, 1960. Consequently, Cuba began to consolidate trade relations with the Soviet Union, leading the US to break off all remaining official diplomatic relations. Later that year, U.S. diplomats Edwin L. Sweet and Wiliam G. Friedman were arrested and expelled from the island, having been charged with "encouraging terrorist acts, granting asylum, financing subversive publications and smuggling weapons". The U.S. began the formulation of new plans aimed at destabilizing the Cuban government, collectively known as "The Cuban Project" (aka Operation Mongoose). This was to be a co-ordinated program of political, psychological and military sabotage, involving intelligence operations as well as assassination attempts on key political leaders. The Cuban project also proposed false flag attacks, known as Operation Northwoods. A U.S. Senate Select Intelligence Committee report later confirmed over eight attempted plots to kill Castro between 1960 and 1965, as well as additional plans against other Cuban leaders.

Besides this aggressive policy towards Cuba, John F. Kennedy tried to implement the Alliance for Progress, an economic aid program which proved to be too shy signed at an inter-American conference at Punta del Este, Uruguay, in August 1961.

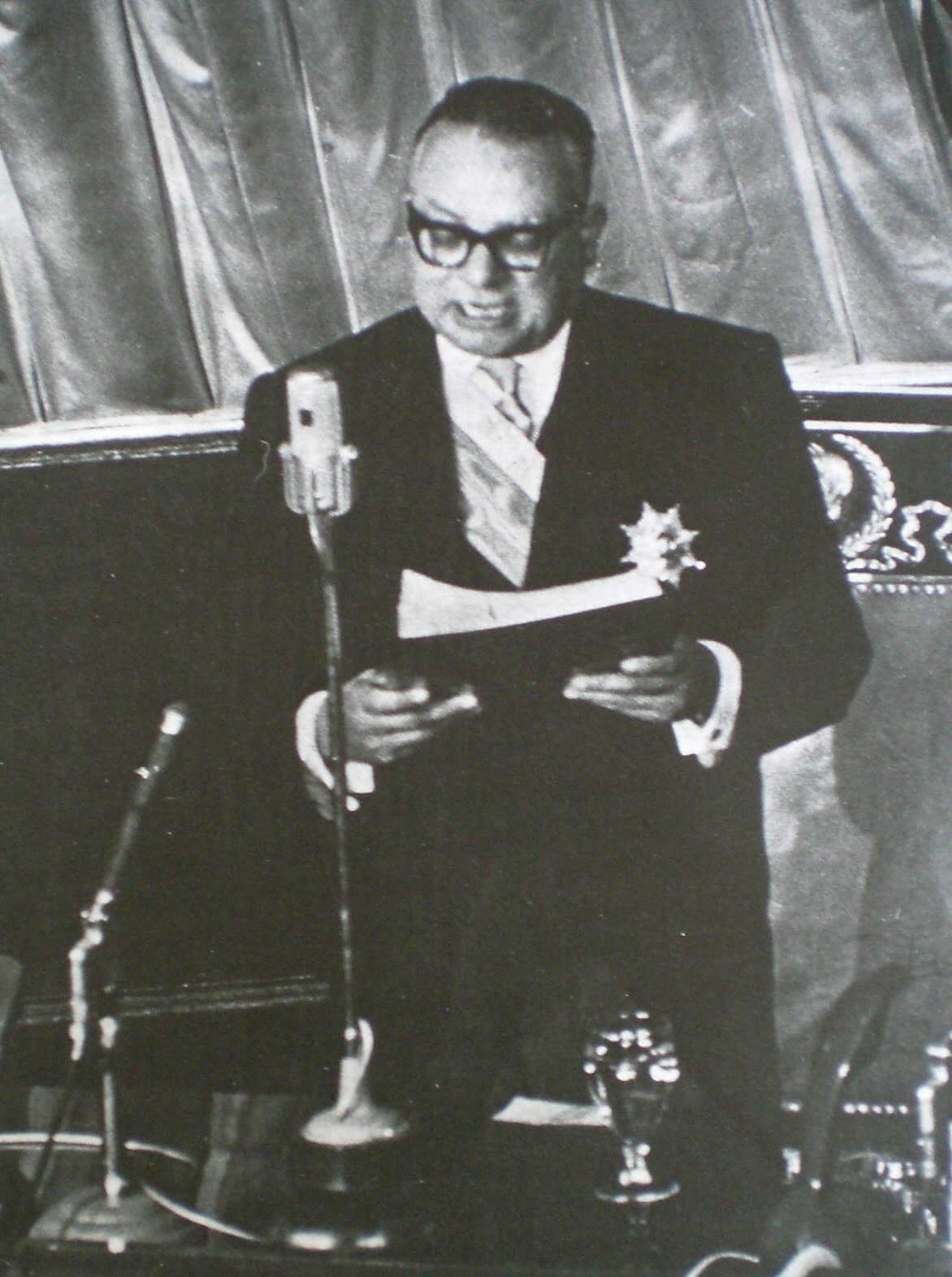
Romulo Betancourt's inaugural address in 1959

In Venezuela, president Rómulo Betancourt faced determined opposition from extremists and rebellious army units, yet he continued to push for economic and educational reform. A fraction split from the government party, Democratic Action, and formed the Revolutionary Left Movement (MIR). Leftists were involved in unsuccessful revolts at military bases during El Barcelonazo, El Carupanazo, El Porteñazo). Elements of the left parties then formed the Armed Forces for National Liberation (FALN), a communist guerrilla army, to overthrow the democratic Betancourt administration. This drove the leftists underground, where they engaged in rural and urban guerrilla activities, including sabotaging oil pipelines, bombing a Sears Roebuck warehouse, kidnapping American colonel Michael Smolen, seizing soccer star Alfredo Di Stefano, and bombing the United States Embassy in Caracas. FALN failed to rally the rural poor and to disrupt the 1963 presidential elections.

After numerous attacks, the MIR and Communist Party of Venezuela (PCV) members of Congress were finally arrested. It became clear that Fidel Castro had been arming the rebels, so Venezuela protested to the Organization of American States (OAS). At the same time, the U.S. suspended economic and/or broke off diplomatic relations with several dictatorships between 1961 and JFK's assassination in 1963, including Argentina, the Dominican Republic, Ecuador, Guatemala, Honduras and Peru. However, these suspensions were imposed only temporarily, for periods of only three weeks to six months. However, the US finally decided it best to train Latin American militaries in counter-insurgency tactics at the School of the Americas. In effect, the Alliance for Progress included U.S. programs of military and police assistance to counter Communism, including Plan LAZO in Colombia from 1959 to 1964.

The nuclear arms race brought the two superpowers to the brink of nuclear war. In 1962, President John F. Kennedy responded to the installation of nuclear missiles in Cuba with a naval blockade—a show of force that brought the world close to nuclear war. The Cuban Missile Crisis showed that neither superpower was ready to use nuclear weapons for fear of the other's retaliation, and thus of mutually assured destruction. The aftermath of the Cuban Missile Crisis led to the first efforts toward nuclear disarmament and improving relations. (Palmowski)

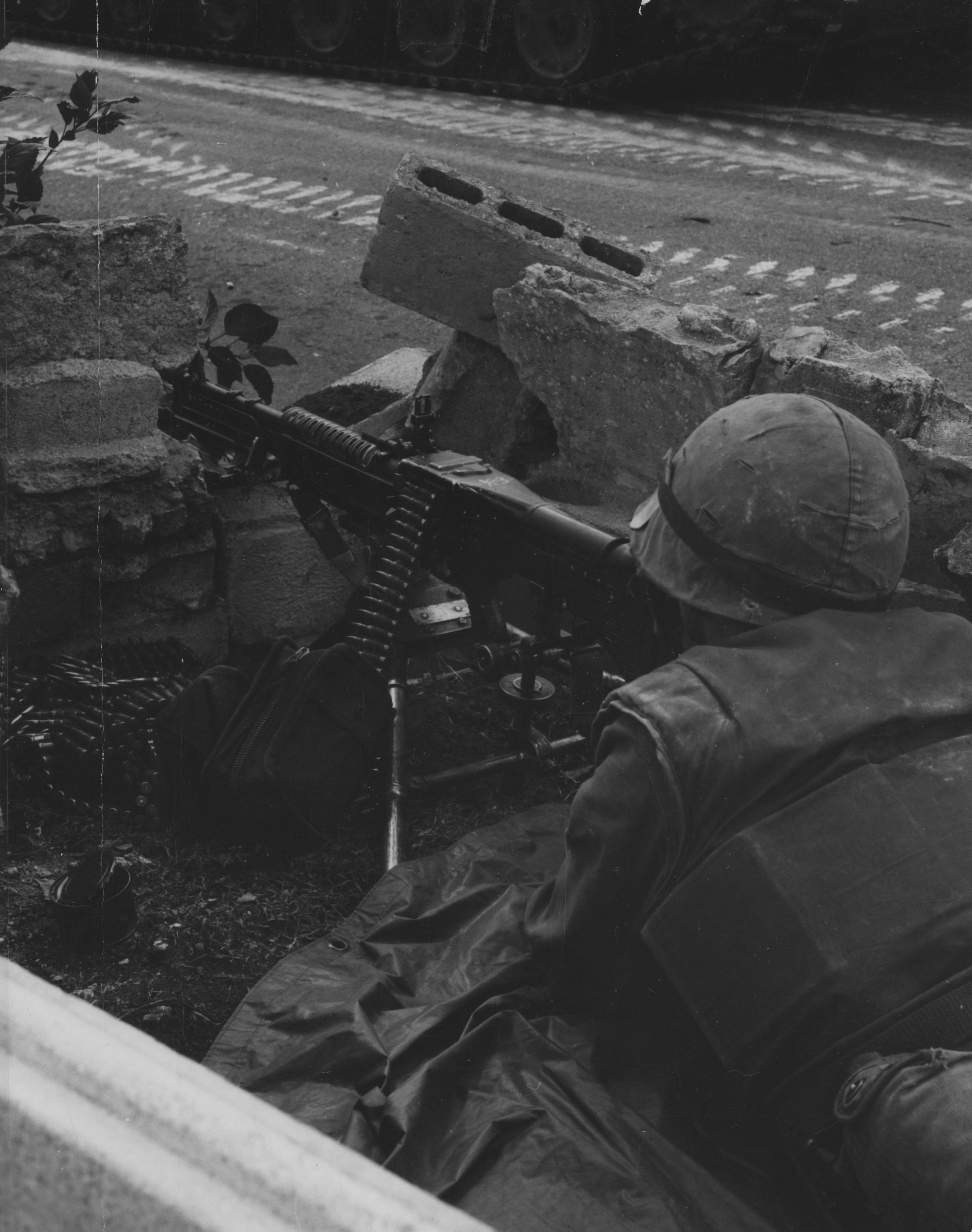
A Marine heavy machine gunner monitors a position along the international neutral corridor in Santo Domingo, 1965.

==== Military dictatorship in Brazil ====
By 1964, under President Lyndon Johnson, the program to discriminate against dictatorial regimes ceased. In March 1964, the U.S. supported a military coup in Brazil, overthrowing left-wing president, João Goulart, and was prepared to help if called upon under Operation Brother Sam. In 1965, the U.S. dispatched 24,000 soldiers to the Dominican Republic to prevent a possible left-wing takeover under Operation Power Pack. Earlier the OAS issued a resolution calling the combatants to end all hostilities. On May 5, the OAS Peace Committee arrived in Santo Domingo and a second definite cease fire agreement was signed, ending the main phase of the civil war. Under the Act of Santo Domingo, OAS was tasked with overseeing the implementation of the peace deal as well as distributing food and medication through the capital. The treaties failed to fully prevent violations such as small-scale firefights and sniper fire. A day later, OAS members established the Inter-American Peace Force (IAPF) with the goal of serving as a peacekeeping formation in the Dominican Republic. IAPF consisted of 1,748 Brazilian, Paraguayan, Nicaraguan, Costa Rican, Salvadoran and Honduran troops and was headed by Brazilian general Hugo Panasco Alvim, with Bruce Palmer serving as his deputy commander.

On May 26, U.S. forces began gradually withdrawing from the island. The first post war elections were held on July 1, 1966, pitting Reformist Party candidate, Joaquín Balaguer, against former president Juan Emilio Bosch Gaviño. Balaguer emerged victorious in the elections, after building his campaign on promises of reconciliation. On September 21, 1966, the last OAS peacekeepers withdrew from the island, ending the foreign intervention in the conflict.

Through the Office of Public Safety, an organization dependent of the USAID and close to the CIA, the US assisted Latin American security forces, training them in interrogation methods, riot control, and sending them materiel. Dan Mitrione in Uruguay became infamous for his systematic use of torture.

=== 1970s ===
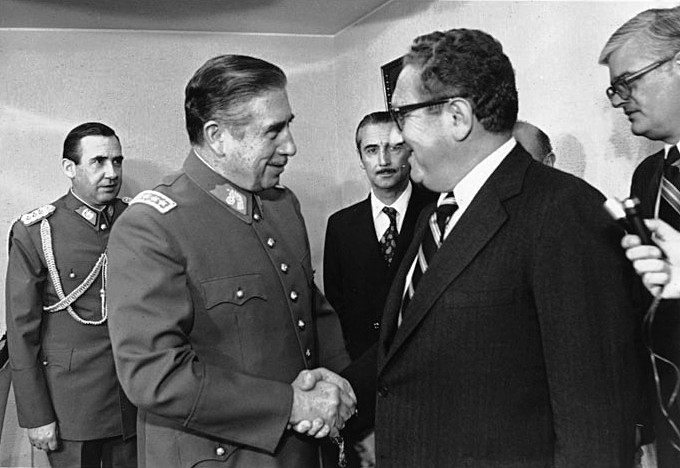
Chilean dictator Augusto Pinochet shaking hands with U.S. Secretary of State Henry Kissinger in 1976

During the 1970s the US worked to stop the spread of what it called "Communist subversives", leading to them support right-wing governments. They also supported Augusto Pinochet's 1973 Chilean coup against democratically elected Salvador Allende. By the end of the 1970s, much of South America was ruled by military dictatorships, called juntas. In Paraguay, Alfredo Stroessner had been in power since 1954; in Brazil, left-wing President João Goulart was overthrown by a military coup in 1964 with the assistance of the US in what was known as Operation Brother Sam; in Bolivia, General Hugo Banzer overthrew leftist General Juan José Torres in 1971; in Uruguay, considered the "Switzerland" of South America, Juan María Bordaberry seized power in the June 27, 1973, coup. In Peru, leftist General Velasco Alvarado in power since 1968, planned to use the recently empowered Peruvian military to overwhelm Chilean armed forces in a planned invasion of Pinochetist Chile. Starting in 1975, a "Dirty War" was waged all over the subcontinent, called Operation Condor, an agreement between security services of the Southern Cone and other South American countries to repress and assassinate exiled political opponents, which was backed by the CIA. The armed forces also took power in Argentina in 1976, and then supported the 1980 "Cocaine Coup" of Luis García Meza Tejada in Bolivia, before training the "Contras" in Nicaragua, where the Sandinista National Liberation Front, headed by Daniel Ortega, had taken power in 1979, as well as militaries in Guatemala and in El Salvador. The US heavily supported right-wing governments during the Salvadoran Civil War, and Guatemalan Civil Wars that ended in the 1990s.

With the election of President Jimmy Carter in 1977, the US moderated for a short time its support to authoritarian regimes in Latin America. It was during that year that the Inter-American Court of Human Rights, an agency of the OAS, was created. At the same time, voices in the US began to denounce Pinochet's violation of human rights, in particular after the 1976 assassination of former Chilean minister Orlando Letelier in Washington D.C.

=== 1980s–1990s: democratization and the Washington Consensus ===
The inauguration of Ronald Reagan in 1981 meant a renewed support for right-wing authoritarian regimes in Latin America. In the 1980s, the situation progressively evolved in the world as in South America, despite a renewal of the Cold War from 1979 to 1985, the year during which Mikhail Gorbachev replaced Konstantin Chernenko as leader of the USSR, and began to implement the glasnost and the perestroika democratic-inspired reforms. South America saw various states returning progressively to democracy. This democratization of South America found a symbol in the OAS' adoption of Resolution 1080 in 1991, which requires the Secretary General to convene the Permanent Council within ten days of a coup d'état in any member country. However, at the same time, Washington started to aggressively pursue the "war on drugs", which included the invasion of Panama in 1989 to overthrow Manuel Noriega, who had been a long-time ally of the US and had even worked for the CIA before his reign as leader of the country. The "war on drugs" was later expanded through Plan Colombia in the late 1990s and the Mérida Initiative in Mexico and Central America.

In the 1982 Falklands War between Argentina and the United Kingdom, two close American allies engaged in a military conflict with each other. While the United States was officially neutral in the conflict, allegations that Reagan provided intelligence to British Prime Minister Margaret Thatcher during the war had a key role in the change of relations between Washington and Buenos Aires, as the military government had been actively helping Reagan. The Argentine intelligence service was training and arming the Nicaraguan Contras against the Sandinista government (Operation Charly). The 601 Intelligence Battalion, for example, trained Contras at Lepaterique base in Honduras, under the supervision of US ambassador John Negroponte. While the U.S. was fighting against Nicaragua, leading to the 1986 Nicaragua v. United States case before the International Court of Justice, the U.S. supported authoritarian regimes in Guatemala and Salvador. The support to General Ríos Montt during the Guatemalan Civil War and the alliance with José Napoleón Duarte during the Salvadoran Civil War were legitimized by the Reagan administration as part of the Cold War, although other allies strongly criticized this assistance to dictatorships (for instance in the French Socialist Party's 110 Propositions).

Due to the covert U.S. support allegedly given, without mediation, to the United Kingdom during the Falklands War in 1982, a deep weakening of hemispheric relations occurred. In Brazil, this was taken by the academic establishment as a clear example of how the Hemispheric relations worked, leading to new perspectives in matters of foreign policy and international relations by the Brazilian establishment. Some of these academics, in fact, argue that this definitively turned the TIAR into a dead letter, and the Mexican government withdrew from the treaty in 2001 citing the Falklands example, though notably Argentina itself is still a TIAR member.

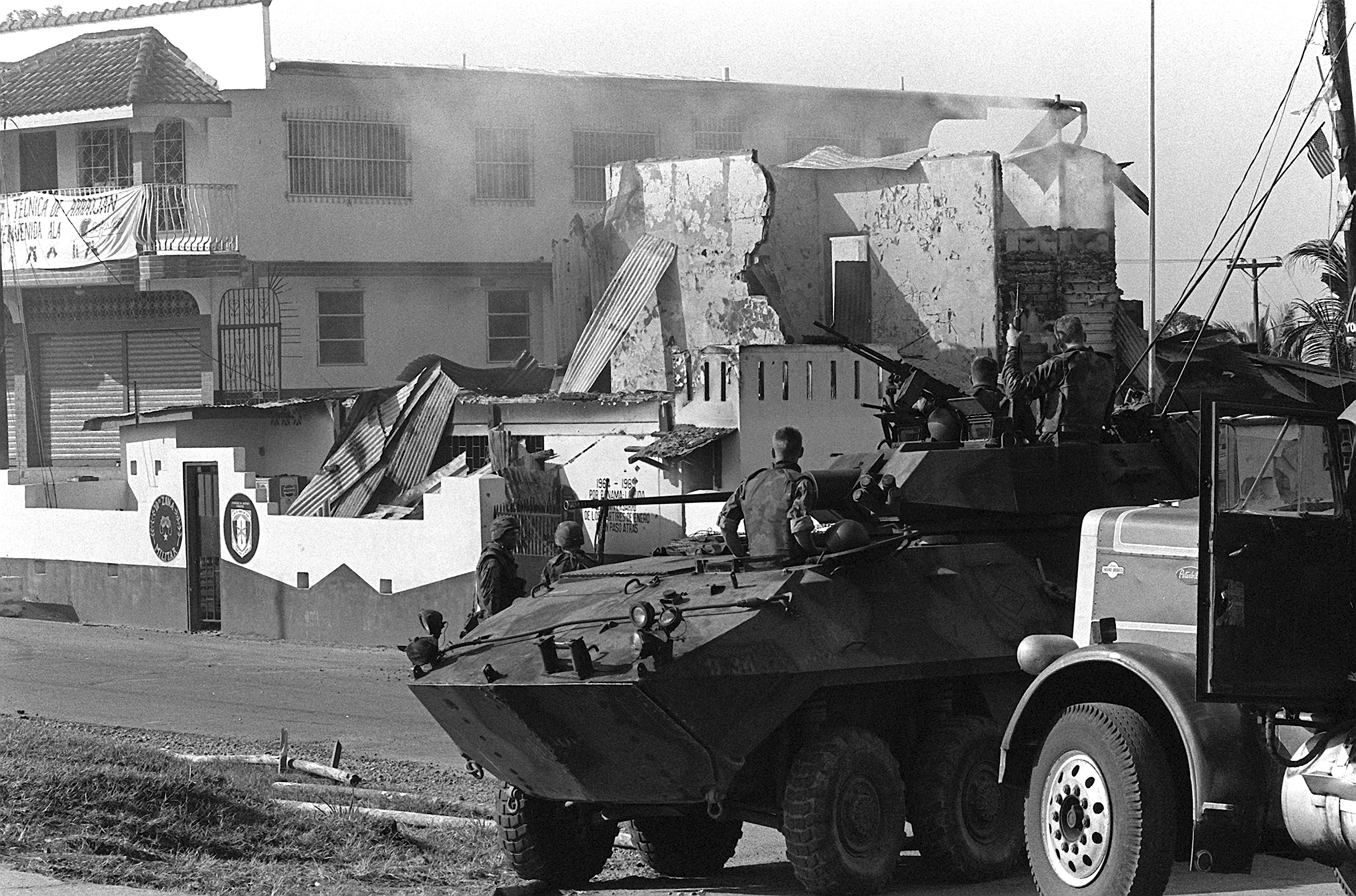
United States invasion of Panama in December 1989

In 2001, the United States invoked the Rio Treaty (TIAR) after the September 11 attacks, but only a few Latin American democracies would join the Coalition of the Willing during the 2003 Iraq War.

On the economic plane, hardly affected by the 1973 oil crisis, the refusal of Mexico in 1983 to pay the interest of its debt led to the Latin American debt crisis and subsequently to a shift from the Import substitution industrialization policies followed by most countries to export-oriented industrialization, which was encouraged by the International Monetary Fund (IMF), the World Bank and the World Trade Organization (WTO). While globalization was making its effects felt in the whole world, the 1990s were dominated by the Washington Consensus, which imposed a series of neo-liberal economic reforms in Latin America. The First Summit of the Americas, held in Miami in 1994, resolved to establish a Free Trade Area of the Americas (ALCA, Área de Libre Comercio de las Américas) by 2005. The ALCA was supposed to be the generalization of the North American Free Trade Agreement between Canada, the US and Mexico, which came into force in 1994. Opposition to both NAFTA and ALCA was symbolized during this time by the Zapatista Army of National Liberation insurrection, headed by Subcomandante Marcos, which became active on the day that NAFTA went into force (January 1, 1994) and declared itself to be in explicit opposition to the ideology of globalization or neoliberalism, which NAFTA symbolized.

=== Early 21st century ===
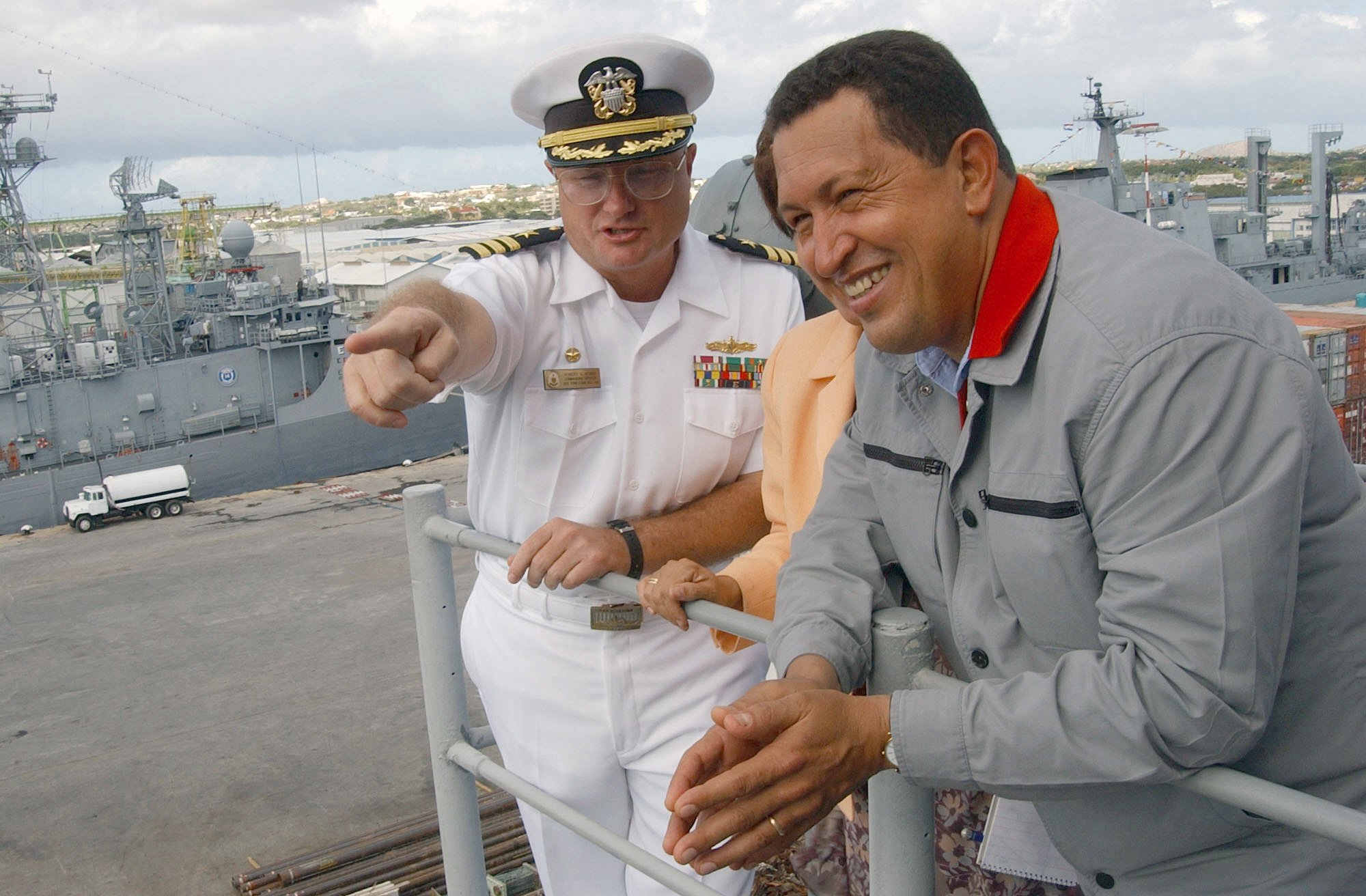
Chávez visiting the USS Yorktown, a US Navy ship docked at Curaçao in the Netherlands Antilles, in 2002

The political context evolved again in the 2000s, with the election in several South American countries of socialist governments. This "pink tide" thus saw the successive elections of Hugo Chávez in Venezuela (1998), Lula in Brazil (2002), Néstor Kirchner in Argentina (2003), Tabaré Vázquez in Uruguay (2004), Evo Morales in Bolivia (2005), Michelle Bachelet in Chile (2006), Daniel Ortega in Nicaragua (2006), Rafael Correa in Ecuador (2006), Fernando Lugo in Paraguay (2008), José Mujica in Uruguay (2009), Ollanta Humala in Peru (2011), Luis Guillermo Solís in Costa Rica (2014), Salvador Sánchez Cerén in El Salvador (2014), and Andrés Manuel López Obrador in Mexico (2018). Although these leaders vary in their policies and attitude towards both Washington, D.C. and neoliberalism, while the states they govern also have different agendas and long-term historic tendencies, which can lead to rivalry and open contempt between themselves, they seem to have agreed on refusing the ALCA and on following a regional integration without the United States' overseeing the process. In particular, Chávez and Morales seem more disposed to ally together, while Kirchner and Lula, who has been criticized by the left-wing in Brazil, including by the Movimento dos Sem Terra (MST) landless peasants movement (who, however, did call to vote for him on his second term), are seen as more centered. The state of Bolivia also has seen some friction with Brazil, as well as Chile. Nouriel Roubini, professor of economics at New York University, said in a May 2006 interview: "On one side, you have a number of administrations that are committed to moderate economic reform. On the other, you've had something of a backlash against the Washington Consensus [a set of liberal economic policies that Washington-based institutions urged Latin American countries to follow, including privatization, trade liberalization and fiscal discipline] and some emergence of populist leaders." In the same way, although a leader such as Chávez verbally attacked the George W. Bush administration as much as the latter attacked him, and claimed to be following a democratic socialist Bolivarian Revolution, the geo-political context has changed a lot since the 1970s. Larry Birns, director of the Council on Hemispheric Affairs, thus stated:

La Paz has found itself at the economic and political nexus of the pink tide, linked by ideology to Caracas, but economically bound to Brasília and Buenos Aires. One thing that Morales knew, however, was that he couldn't repudiate his campaign pledges to the electorate or deprive Bolivia of the revenue that is so urgently needed.

One sign of the US setback in the region was the OEA 2005 Secretary General election. For the first time in the OEA's history, Washington's candidate was refused by the majority of countries, after two stalemates between José Miguel Insulza, member of the Socialist Party of Chile and former Interior Minister of the latter country, and Luis Ernesto Derbez, member of the conservative National Action Party (PAN) and former Foreign Minister of Mexico. Derbez was explicitly supported by the US, Canada, Mexico, Belize, Saint Vincent and the Grenadines, Bolivia (then presided by Carlos Mesa), Costa Rica, El Salvador, Honduras and Nicaragua, while Chilean minister José Insulza was supported by all the Southern Cone countries, as well as Brazil, Ecuador, Venezuela and the Dominican Republic. José Insulza was finally elected at the third turn, and took office on May 26, 2005.

==== Free trade and other regional integration ====
Momentum for the Free Trade Area of the Americas (ALCA) was lost after the 2005 Mar del Plata Summit of the Americas, which saw strong protests against the proposal from members of the anti-globalization movement from across the continent, however free trade agreements were not abandoned. Regional economic integration under the sign of neoliberalism continued: Under the Bush administration, the United States, which had signed two free-trade agreements with Latin American countries, signed eight further agreements, reaching a total of ten such bilateral agreements (including the United States-Chile Free Trade Agreement in 2003, the Colombia Trade Promotion Agreement in 2006, etc.). Three others, including the Peru-United States Free Trade Agreement signed in 2006, are awaiting for ratification by the US Congress.

The Cuzco Declaration, signed a few weeks before at the Third South American Summit, announced the foundation of the Union of South American Nations (Unasul-Unasur) grouping Mercosur countries and the Andean Community and which as the aim of eliminating tariffs for non-sensitive products by 2014 and sensitive products by 2019. On the other hand, the CAFTA-DR free-trade agreement (Dominican Republic–Central America Free Trade Agreement) was ratified by all countries except Costa Rica. The president of the latter country, Óscar Arias, member of the National Liberation Party and elected in February 2006, pronounced himself in favor of the agreement. Costa Rica then held a national referendum in which the population voted to approve CAFTA, which was then done by the parliament. Canada, which also has a free-trade agreement with Costa Rica, has also been negotiating such an agreement with Central American country, named Canada Central American Free Trade Agreement.

Reformist Luis Guillermo Solís of the Citizens Action Party was elected in 2014. Solís belongs to a moderate Progressive party and had no link with the far-left, and also kept a friendly relationship with the USA, nevertheless his victory was also attributed to a general contempt toward Washington-endorsed neoliberal policies (Solís, for example, was a staunch opponent of CAFTA). During his presidency Solís established close relationships with some Progressive governments of South America, to the point of leaving the United Nations' chambers during Michel Temer's speech in protest for Rousseff's impeachment in September 2016. On the other hand, the Costa Rican Foreign Ministry has condemned Venezuela's government accusing it of being authoritarian and anti-democratic.

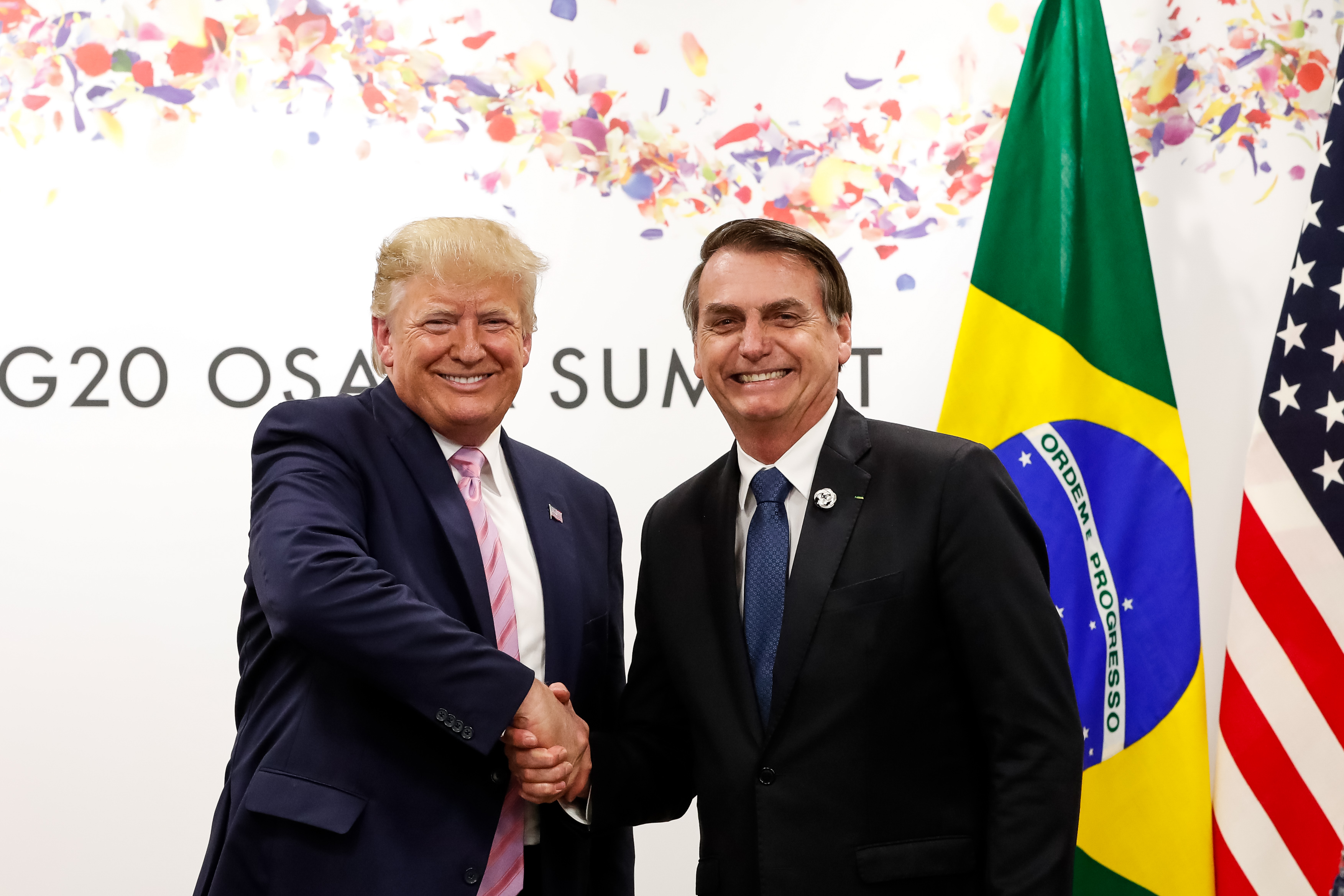
U.S. President Donald Trump with Brazilian President Jair Bolsonaro in June 2019

Mercosur, the trade agreement between Argentina, Brazil, Paraguay and Uruguay (with Venezuela currently suspended) is also in negotiations to sign a wider free-trade agreement with the European Union, following the signing of similar agreements with the Andean Community, Israel and Egypt in August 2010, among others. These negotiations between Mercosur and the EU are advancing rapidly again after stalling during the 2000s.

On the other hand, a number of Latin American countries located in the Pacific such as Chile, Mexico and Peru have signed the Trans-Pacific Partnership with Australia, Brunei, Canada, Japan, Malaysia, New Zealand, Singapore and Vietnam. The agreement, originally signed on February 4, 2016, is being renegotiated after the United States withdrew. The eleven remaining members reached a partial agreement on November 11, 2017.

==== Bilateral investment treaties ====
Apart from binational free-trade agreements, the US has also signed a number of bilateral investment treaties (BIT) with Latin American countries, establishing the conditions of foreign direct investment. These treaties include "fair and equitable treatment", protection from expropriation, free transfer of means and full protection and security. Critics point out that US negotiators can control the pace, content and direction of bilateral negotiations with individual countries more easily than they can with larger negotiating frameworks.

In case of a disagreement between a multinational firm and a state over some kind of investment made in a Latin American country, the firm may depose a lawsuit before the International Centre for Settlement of Investment Disputes (International Center for the Resolution of Investment Disputes), which is an international court depending on the World Bank. Such a lawsuit was deposed by the US-based multinational firm Bechtel following its expulsion from Bolivia during the Cochabamba protests of 2000. Local population had demonstrated against the privatization of the water company, requested by the World Bank, after poor management of the water by Bechtel. Thereafter, Bechtel requested $50 million from the Bolivian state in reparation. However, the firm finally decided to drop the case in 2006 after an international protest campaign.

Such BIT were passed between the US and numerous countries (the given date is not of signature but of entrance in force of the treaty): Argentina (1994), Bolivia (2001), Ecuador (1997), Grenada (1989), Honduras (2001), Jamaica (1997), Panama (1991, amended in 2001), Trinidad and Tobago (1996). Others where signed but not ratified: El Salvador (1999), Haiti (1983 – one of the earliest, preceded by Panama), Nicaragua (1995).

==== The ALBA ====
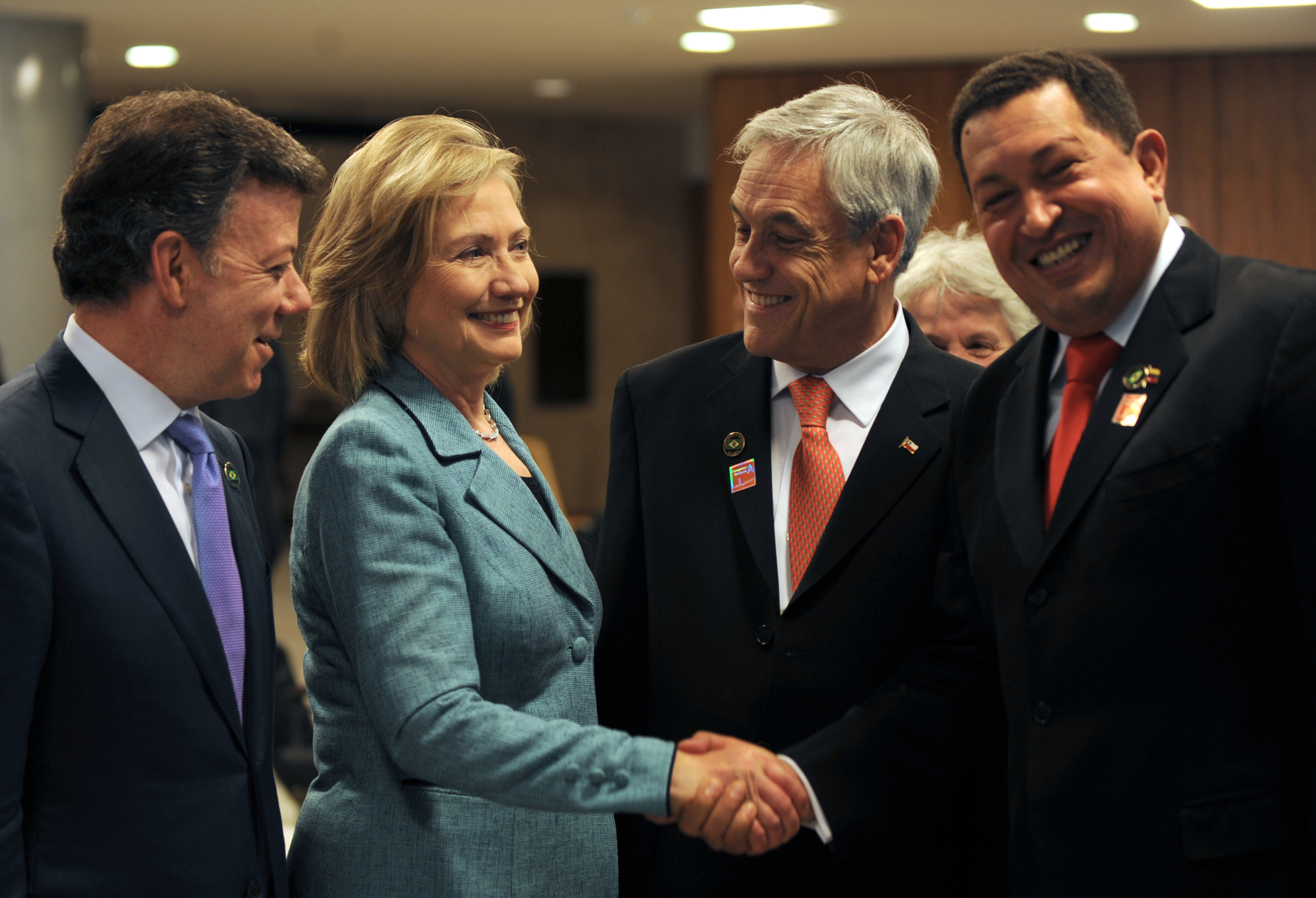
Manuel Santos, Hillary Clinton, Sebastián Piñera and Hugo Chávez meeting on January 1, 2011, Brasília

In reply to the ALCA, Chavez initiated the Bolivarian Alliance for the Americas (ALBA). Venezuela, Cuba and Bolivia signed the TCP (or People's Trade Agreement), while Venezuela, a main productor of natural gas and of petroleum (it is member of the OPEC) has signed treaties with Nicaragua, where Daniel Ortega, former leader of the Sandinistas, was elected in 2006 – Ortega, however, cut down his anti-imperialist and socialist discourse, and is hotly controversial; both on the right-wing and on the left-wing. Chávez also implemented the Petrocaribe alliance, signed by 12 of the 15 members of the Caribbean Community in 2005. When Hurricane Katrina ravaged Florida and Louisiana, Chávez, who called the "Yanqui Empire" a "paper tiger", even ironically proposed to provide "oil-for-the-poor" to the US after Hurricane Katrina the same year, through Citgo, a subsidiary of PDVSA the state-owned Venezuelan petroleum company, which has 14,000 gas stations and owns eight oil refineries in the US.

==== The U.S. military coalition in Iraq ====
In June 2003, some 1,200 troops from Dominican Republic, El Salvador, Honduras, and Nicaragua joined forces along with Spaniard forces (1,300 troops) to form the Plus Ultra Brigade in Iraq. The brigade was dissolved in April 2004 following the retirement of Spain from Iraq, and all Latin American nations, except El Salvador, withdrew their troops.

In September 2005, it was revealed that Triple Canopy, Inc., a private military company present in Iraq, was training Latin American mercenaries in Lepaterique in Honduras. Lepaterique was a former training base for the Contras. 105 Chilean mercenaries were deported from the country. According to La Tribuna Honduran newspaper, in one day in November, Your Solutions shipped 108 Hondurans, 88 Chileans and 16 Nicaraguans to Iraq. Approximatively 700 Peruvians, 250 Chileans and 320 Hondurans work in Baghdad's Green Zone for Triple Canopy, paid half price in comparison to North-American employees. The news also attracted attention in Chile, when it became known that retired military Marina Óscar Aspe worked for Triple Canopy. The latter had taken part to the assassination of Marcelo Barrios Andrade, a 21-year-old member of the FPMR, who is on the list of victims of the Rettig Report – while Marina Óscar Aspe is on the list of the 2001 Comisión Ética contra la Tortura (2001 Ethical Commission Against Torture). Triple Canopy also has a subsidiary in Peru.

In July 2007, Salvadoran president Antonio Saca reduced the number of deployed troops in Iraq from 380, to 280 soldiers. Four Salvadoran soldiers died in different situations since deployment in 2003, but on the bright side, more than 200 projects aimed to rebuild Iraq were completed.

==== Bolivia's nationalization of natural resources ====
2003 Poster for a photo exhibition of the Bolivian Gas War, which lead to the resignation of president Gonzalo Sanchez de Losada and the subsequent election of Evo Morales.

The struggle for natural resources and the US defense of its commercial interests has not ceased since the zenith period of the banana republics supported by the US. The general context has changed significantly and each country's approach has evolved accordingly. Thus, the Bolivian Gas War in 2003–04 was sparked after projects by the Pacific LNG consortium to export natural gas – Bolivia possessing the second largest natural gas reserves in South America after Venezuela – to California (Baja California and US California) via Chile, resented in Bolivia since the War of the Pacific (1879–1884) which deprived it of an access to the Pacific Ocean. The ALCA was also opposed during the demonstrations, headed by the Bolivian Workers' Center and Felipe Quispe's Indigenous Pachakuti Movement (MIP).

A proof of the new geopolitical context can be seen in Evo Morales' announcement, in concordance with his electoral promises, of the nationalization of gas reserves, the second highest in South America after Venezuela. First of all, he carefully warned that they would not take the form of expropriations or confiscations, maybe fearing a violent response. The nationalizations, which, according to Vice President Álvaro García, are supposed to make the government's energy-related revenue jump to $780 million in the following year, expanding nearly sixfold from 2002, led to criticisms from Brazil, which Petrobras company is one of the largest foreign investors in Bolivia, controlling 14 percent of the country's gas reserves. Bolivia is one of the poorest countries in South America and was heavily affected by protests in the 1980s–90s, largely due to the shock therapy enforced by previous governments, and also by resentment concerning the coca eradication program – coca is a traditional plant for the Native Quechua and Aymara people, who use it for therapeutical (against altitude sickness) and cultural purposes. Thus, Brazil's Energy Minister, Silas Rondeau, reacted to Morales' announcement by condemning the move as "unfriendly." According to Reuters, "Bolivia's actions echo what Venezuelan President Hugo Chávez, possibly Morales' biggest ally, did in the world's fifth-largest oil exporter with forced contract migrations and retroactive tax hikes – conditions that major oil companies largely agreed to accept." The Bolivian gas company YPFB, privatized by former President Gonzalo Sanchez de Losada, was to pay foreign companies for their services, offering about 50 percent of the value of production, although the decree indicated that companies exploiting the country's two largest gas fields would get just 18 percent. After initially hostile reactions, Repsol "expressed its willingness to cooperate with the Bolivian government," while Petrobras retreated its call to cancel new investment in Bolivia. However, still according to Larry Birns, "The nationalization's high media profile could force the [US] State Department to take a tough approach to the region, even to the point of mobilizing the CIA and the U.S. military, but it is more likely to work its way by undermining the all-important chink in the armor – the Latin American armed forces."

=== 2020s ===
In the 2020s the political right has achieved significant electoral victories in many Latin American countries. Right-wing presidential candidates were elected in Argentina 2023, El Salvador 2024, Panama 2024, Ecuador 2025, Bolivia 2025, Honduras 2025, Chile 2025, Costa Rica 2026, Peru 2026 and Colombia 2026. The right-wing governments that have come to power in these countries have consistently strengthened their ties with the United States and President Trump´s administration

== Bibliography ==
- Bailey, Thomas A. (1980), A Diplomatic History of the American People (10th ed.), Prentice Hall, ISBN 0-13-214726-2
- Beede, Benjamin R., ed. (1994), The War of 1898 and US Interventions, 1898–1934, Taylor & Francis, ISBN 978-0824056247, archived from the original on May 27, 2016
- Dyal, Donald H; Carpenter, Brian B.; Thomas, Mark A. (1996), Historical Dictionary of the Spanish American War, Greenwood Press, ISBN 978-0313288524, archived from the original on September 15, 2014
- Pérez, Louis A. Jr. (1998). The War of 1898: the United States and Cuba in history and historiography. Chapel Hill: University of North Carolina Press. ISBN 978-0-8078-4742-8.
