= Fabricio Ojeda =

Venezuelan politician (1929–1966)

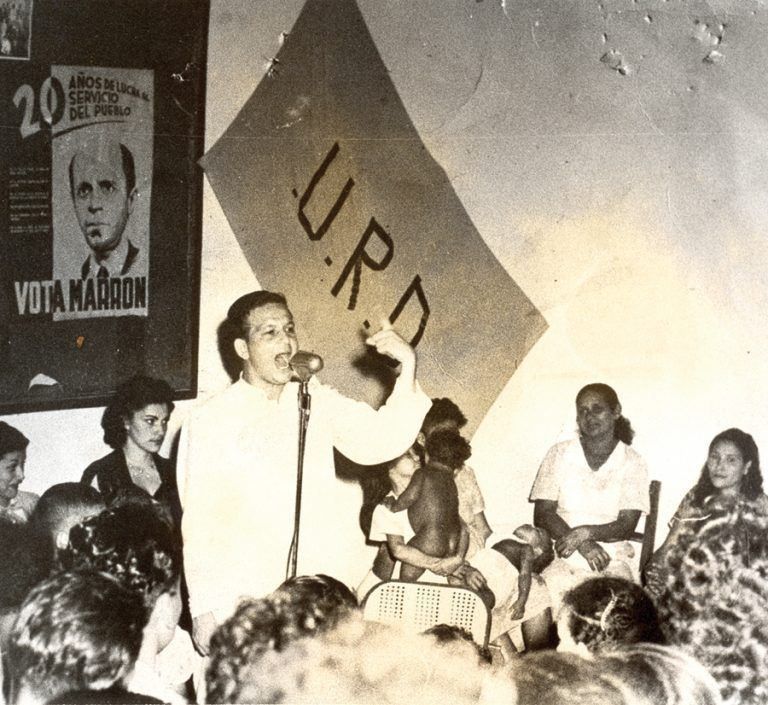
Fabricio Ojeda in 1958

Fabricio Ojeda (6 February 1929 - 21 June 1966) was a Venezuelan journalist, politician, and guerrilla leader. He was the President of the Patriotic Junta that organised the movement to end Marcos Pérez Jiménez' dictatorship (1952-1958), and was then elected to the Venezuelan Chamber of Representatives for the Democratic Republican Union (URD), before becoming a leader of the Armed Forces of National Liberation (FALN). He died in custody in 1966 after allegedly committing suicide.

== Biography ==
As a student Ojeda became a member of the Democratic Republican Union (URD). In 1955 he began studying journalism at the Central University of Venezuela. In 1956 he became a reporter for El Nacional, based in the Miraflores Palace, and used this position to help organise the end of Pérez' rule. On 11 June 1957 Ojeda invited two other URD members and a Communist, Guillermo García Ponce, to his home, and they agreed that the time was ripe to form a multi-partisan organisation aiming to overthrow Pérez. The Patriotic Junta was soon joined by Democratic Action and COPEI, and used the only clandestine press left in Venezuela, that of the Communist Party of Venezuela, to publish a manifesto. The Junta ultimately played a leading role in coordinating the 1958 Venezuelan coup d'état the following January, including organising a general strike on 21 January. As the head of the Patriotic Junta, Ojeda emerged from the Pérez dictatorship as the most important URD member after its leader, Jóvito Villalba.

Ojeda was elected to the Venezuelan Chamber of Deputies for the URD in the 1958 general election, but despite the Pact of Punto Fijo power-sharing agreement the URD was edged out of power, and it left the government in 1960. Shortly after the failed military rebellions of El Carupanazo (May) and El Porteñazo (June), Ojeda resigned as representative on 30 June 1962, announcing that he was joining the armed guerrilla movement. He was captured in October 1962, and was later involved in the launch of the Armed Forces of National Liberation (FALN) and its political wing, the National Liberation Front (FLN), in February 1963. Ojeda escaped from prison on 15 September 1963 (with the support of the FALN and supporters in the regular army), and became Commander of the Frente Guerrillero 'José Antonio Páez', one of the FALN's cells. On 21 June 1966 Ojeda was captured in Caracas, and was found in his cell four days later, dead from suicide.

== See also ==
- List of Venezuelans
