= FALN =

FALN is an acronym for Fuerzas Armadas de Liberación Nacional (English: "Armed Forces of National Liberation").

It can refer to:

- Fuerzas Armadas de Liberación Nacional Puertorriqueña (Puerto Rico)
- Armed Forces of National Liberation (Venezuela), also known as Fuerzas Armadas de Liberación Nacional
