= Second presidency of Rómulo Betancourt =

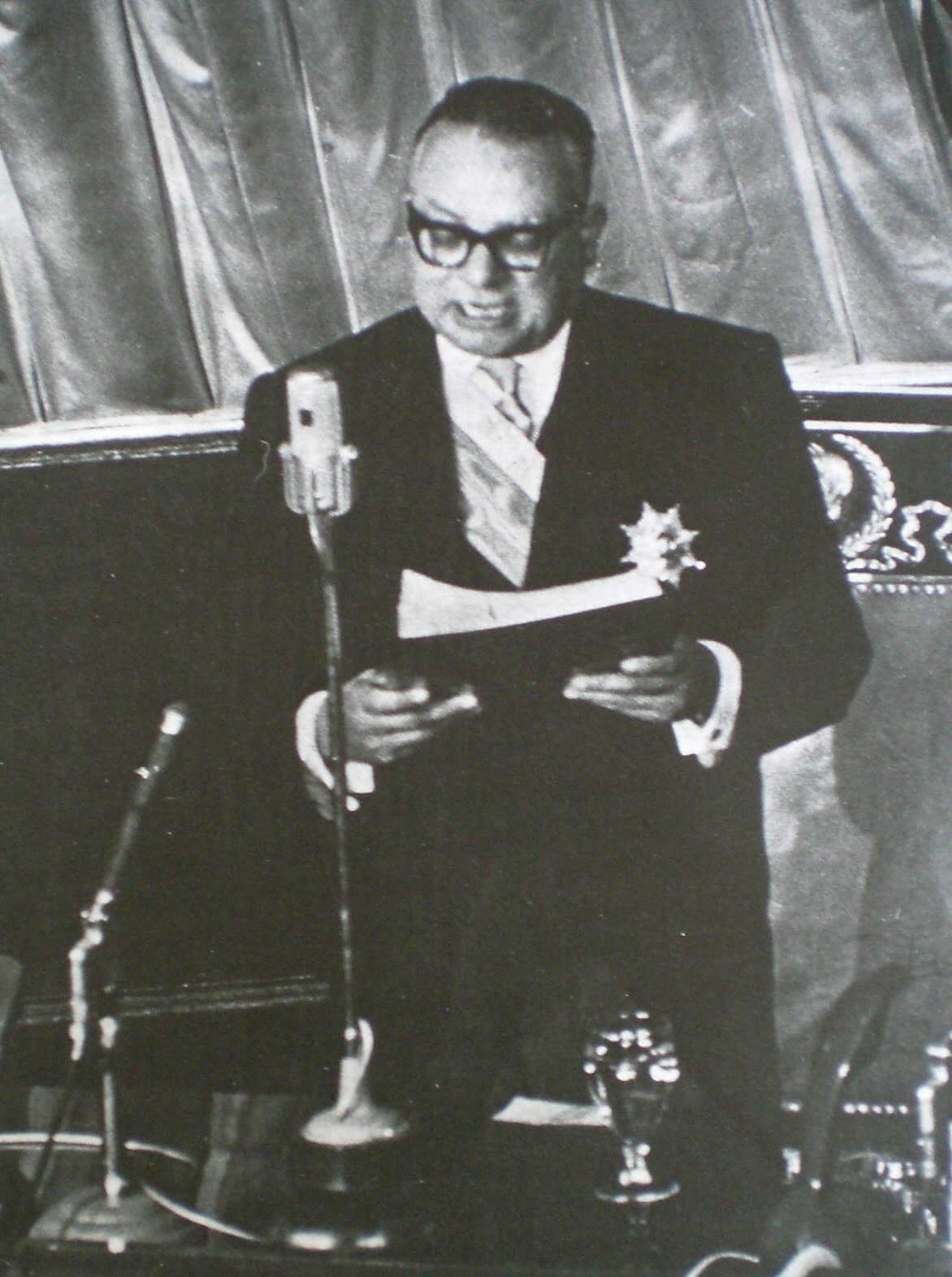
Betancourt's inaugural address in 1959

Rómulo Betancourt won the 1958 Venezuelan general elections for Democratic Action and held the Presidency of Venezuela from February 13, 1959, to March 13, 1964.

Betancourt started his second presidency (his first had been under El Trienio Adeco) as a moderate, except on the issue of dictatorships, instituting the foreign policy (known as the Betancourt Doctrine) that Venezuela would not recognize dictatorial government anywhere, particularly in Latin America, but including the USSR. One significant domestic policy was land reform, with land largely from expropriated private landholdings redistributed to around 200,000 families.

Betancourt's term in office saw the split of the Revolutionary Left Movement from Democratic Action in 1960, several military rebellions, and the development of a guerrilla movement that included the Armed Forces of National Liberation (FALN). Betancourt survived an assassination attempt on June 24, 1960, blamed on Rafael Leonidas Trujillo, dictator of the Dominican Republic.

== Domestic policy ==
=== Legislative policy ===
President Betancourt had an absolute majority in the National Congress with his party, Democratic Action, granting in coalition three ministries to Democration Republican Union (URD), two to Democratic Action and two to COPEI, and five ministries to independents. Raúl Leoni (Democratic Action) and Rafael Caldera (COPEI) were appointed president of the Senate and of the Chamber of Deputies, respectively.

During his government, the 1961 Venezuelan Constitution was sanctioned, quite similar to the 1947 Constitution repealed in 1948 during the dictatorship of Carlos Delgado Chalbaud. During the presidential address on this matter, the Communist Party, Movement of the Revolutionary Left, and URD parties withdrew from Congress in protest.

In May 1961, President Betancourt requested from Congress the approval of a Law of Urgent Economic Measures for one year, which was approved. Constitutional guarantees were suspended on August 4, 1959, June 25, 1960, November 28, 1960, January 23, 1961, May 4, 1961, and October 7, 1962.

=== Defense ===
The Betancourt government promoted the Organic Law of the Armed Forces, which declared the subordination of the military to civilian power. Betancourt said in 1977:

"We [...] from 1945 worked with a group of young, constitutionalist officers, supporters of profound reforms in the country's structure. They, after the fall of Pérez Jiménez, became the backbone of the reform of the Armed Forces, which retired the coup‑minded elements and strove to make the Army an essentially technical body systematically educated in respect for the legal order."

=== Electoral policy ===
On May 15, 1962, Betancourt decreed the disqualification of the Communist Party (PCV) and the Movement of the Revolutionary Left (MIR).

=== Energy ===
Betancourt's mines and hydrocarbons minister, Juan Pablo Pérez Alfonso, was responsible for conceiving and creating OPEC and the Corporacion Venezolana del Petroleo (CVP).

On December 29, 1960, the Corporación Venezolana de Guayana (CVG) was founded for the mining and energy exploitation of the region.

=== Education ===
On September 2, 1963, the Betancourt government raided the Central University of Venezuela (UCV). President Betancourt also pressured De Venanzi, the rector of the UCV, to take decisions against the autonomy and the students of the university.

=== Media policy ===
On October 14, 1960, editors of the weekly Izquierdas were detained for an editorial critical of the government, among them Gusmersindo Rodríguez.

On June 1, 1962, the news editor of El Nacional, José Moradell, appeared before the Interior Policy Commission of the Chamber of Deputies and denounced censorship against the newspaper; the newspaper's information chief declared that every night two persons sent by the Ministry of Interior came to the newspaper's offices and reviewed the material to be published.

=== Land reform ===
During the brief first period of democracy (El Trienio Adeco, 1945–48), the Democratic Action government had redistributed land which it said had been gained illicitly by members of previous governments, and in mid-1948 it enacted an agrarian reform law. However most of the land redistributed in this way was returned to its previous owners during the 1948-58 dictatorship of Marcos Pérez Jiménez. After the 1958 restoration of democracy brought Betancourt to office again, a new land reform law was enacted in March 1960, with reform in the early 1960s concentrated in the northeastern states of Miranda, Aragua and Carabobo, and coming largely from expropriated private landholdings. The reform was accompanied by a considerable increase in agricultural production. Ultimately the reform saw about 200,000 families receive transfers of land, largely in the early 1960s.

== Foreign policy ==
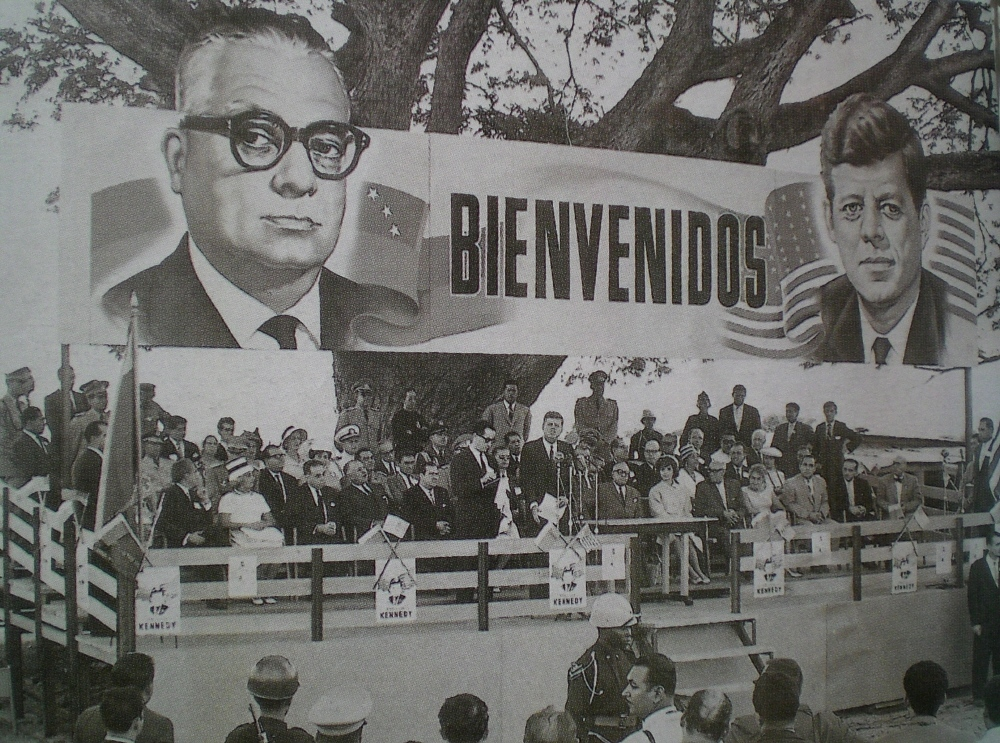
Rómulo Betancourt and U.S. President Kennedy at La Morita, Venezuela, during an official meeting in December 1961. Kennedy embraced Betancourt's strong stance against nondemocratic governments

Betancourt instituted the foreign policy that Venezuela would not recognize dictatorial government anywhere, particularly in Latin America, but including the USSR, an interpretation that pleased the United States. The "Betancourt doctrine" proved unrealistic, for Venezuelan democratization occurred in the midst of a marked tendency in the rest of Latin America towards authoritarianism.

In other matters, Betancourt demonstrated a realistic approach. He respected the virtual autonomy of the armed forces and he worked to keep on the good side of Washington. Betancourt held two particular grudges: against ex-dictator Marcos Pérez Jiménez, for obvious reasons, and against Rafael Leónidas Trujillo, the Dominican dictator against whom in his youth, with José Figueres of Costa Rica, he had carried on an active subversive opposition. The first of these targets of his ire led him to undercut developmental projects which would have been beneficial to his country. His hatred for Trujillo almost cost him his life after a 1960 failed bombing attack, although in the end it was Trujillo who lost his life.

=== United States ===
Pérez Jiménez had gone from the Dominican Republic to Miami, but Betancourt had him accused of filching in the state treasury (justifiably, although only circumstantial evidence existed) and the Venezuelan supreme court convicted him. Venezuela asked the John F. Kennedy administration for the extradition of Pérez Jiménez, and the USA complied, betraying an unconditional ally it had once bestowed a Medal Merit in 1953. Pérez Jiménez was first held in the Miami county jail and was finally sent to Venezuela to finish the term in a prison. In all he spent five years in prison.

The Kennedy administration in the United States of America underwrote all the economic policies of the Betancourt government through the Alliance for Progress, which used Venezuela as the exemplar showcase for all of Latin America. The ideology behind this came in a package called "development economics" expressed in a work by the economist W.W. Rostow, who described economic progress with the "take-off metaphor": A developing economy was like an airplane that got its motors running, taxied to the head of the runway, then sped along until it took off, which was the historical moment of self-sustaining growth. There were many other ideas of this sort. Another was "trickle-down economics", which posited that, as an economy developed, its lower social strata would benefit from the achievements of free enterprise. But in Venezuela free enterprise was a very relative concept because of the proliferation of government regulations, not that Betancourt had anything like a "command economy" in mind, for the rights of private property were never meddled with. The trickle-down effect took the form of political clientelism through which state hand-outs and local state-created posts, some purely nominal, were financed at the lower pardo levels. This was not only the rule in the Caracas shantytowns but also in the rural and semi-rural areas where adeco loyalties were firm. The Betancourt government expanded educational facilities of all sorts on a large scale. New universities were created; vocational and craft schools were founded. Pérez Jiménez's immigration policy was halted. Paradoxically, Venezuelans were not doing basic jobs, such as plumbing and carpentry, and a new and larger wave of immigration swept over the country mainly from Colombia, much of it illegal. Venezuela became for its neighbor what the USA was for Mexico. There was no pardo discrimination — as such this had never existed in Venezuela — but when it came to upper echelon positions in and out of the government, Venezuelan whites and foreigners were generally preferred to the average Venezuelan.

In 1977, The New York Times reported that Interior Minister Carlos Andrés Pérez had allegedly received secret payments from the Central Intelligence Agency (CIA) during Betancourt's government. Betancourt and Pérez denied the accusations.

=== British Empire ===
Rómulo Betancourt promoted Venezuela's claim over British Guiana, calling for its independence from the British Empire and its annexation to Venezuela, and referring to the 1899 Paris Arbitral Award as "iniquitous and unacceptable" in Congress in 1962. His efforts are considered predecessors of the 1966 Geneva Agreement signed during the government of his successor, Raúl Leoni.

=== International trips ===
==== 1962 ====
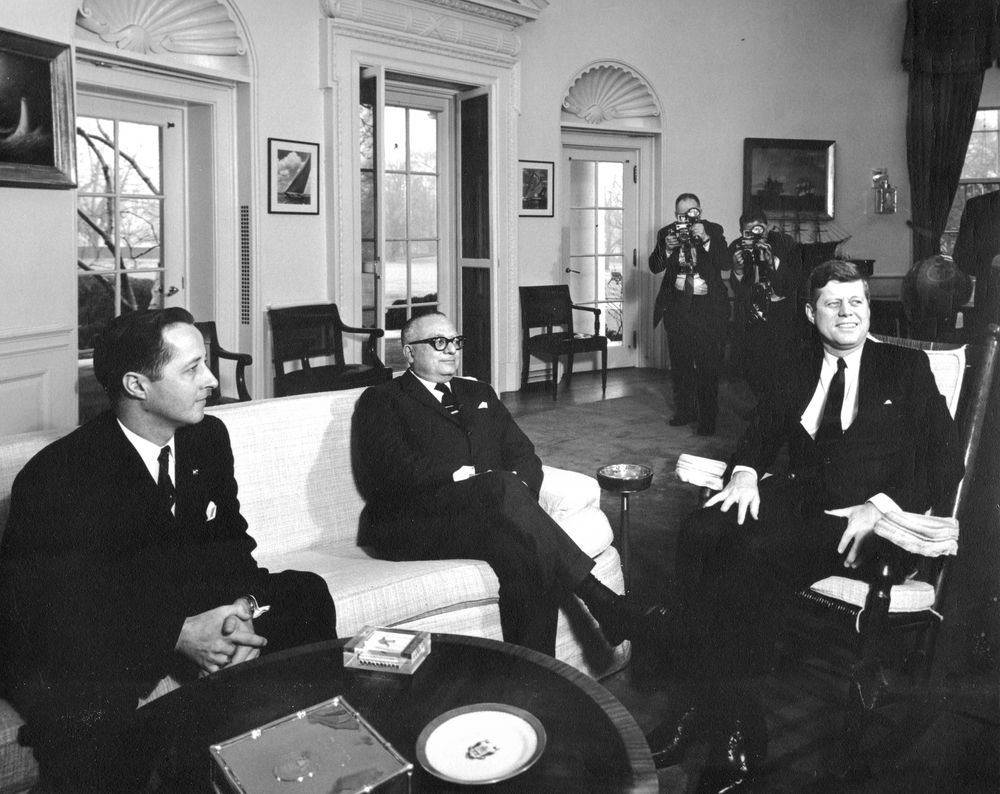
Rómulo Betancourt with U.S. president John F. Kennedy in the Oval Office of the White House in 1963

Date	Location	Main purpose
24 February 1962	Simón Bolívar International Bridge (Colombia–Venezuela border)	Inauguration of the bridge and meeting with Colombian president Alberto Lleras Camargo.

==== 1963 ====
Date	Location	Main purpose
18–23 February 1963	Washington, D.C., New York City, Miami, United States	Official visit.
18–23 February 1963	San Juan, Puerto Rico	Official visit.
23–26 February 1963	Mexico	Official visit.
27 February 1963	Dominican Republic	Inauguration of Dominican president Juan Bosch.

== Opposition ==
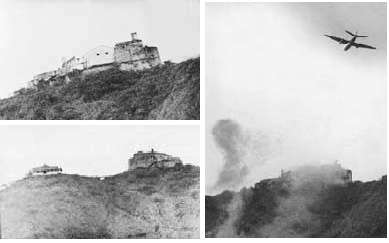
Bombardment of Solano Castle during the Porteñazo rebellion

But Betancourt in power primarily faced the problem of merely surviving, even in a personal sense. The underlying cause of the instability was that the 1958 elections had settled the issue of who had the right to govern democratically, but this was not as many disgruntled officers saw it because they still felt very strongly that it was the armed forces and not the "people" who had overthrown Pérez Jiménez. This created an indescribable mélange of partisans of Pérez Jiménez, rightists who were calling Betancourt a communist in disguise, and new insubordinate officers who were clamoring for a "real revolution". During his first year in power Betancourt was the object of an assassination attempt through a remote-control car bomb. He suffered minor lesions. The Dominican dictator Trujillo, who himself was assassinated by his own disaffected officers in 1961, was blamed, but the actual perpetrators were Venezuelans. Then, military insurrections in Barcelona (1961), Carúpano and in Puerto Cabello, which were supposed to take place simultaneously in 1962, instead followed upon each other. The promoter among the military of these rebellious movements was a then little-known personage called Manuel Quijada. The military held their part of the 1958 agreement with Betancourt and suppressed them. But the strangest of all the movements against Betancourt, and the least effectual — although El Carupanazo (Carúpano) and El Porteñazo (Puerto Cabello) can only be described as aberrations — came from the communist left.

Venezuelan leftists, and especially the communists, were watching Fidel Castro in Cuba, and they came to the conclusion, not entirely unlike that of the rightist officers who had plotted against Betancourt, that the 1958 "revolution" had been hijacked at its most popular and effervescent and that they were going to attempt a repeat of Castro's Cuban Revolution. Urban guerrillas were formed even as in Congress leftists were clamoring against Betancourt. The Revolutionary Left Movement split from Democratic Action in 1960 and later supported the Armed Forces of National Liberation (FALN). The subversive cells carried out some sensational acts, one being the daylight robbery of an exhibition of Impressionist painters sponsored by France at the Venezuelan art museum. In another more deadly action they shot and killed eight Venezuelan soldiers in the back to steal their weapons. Betancourt put his aide Pérez in charge of repression. The leftist deputies were arrested, and the urban insurrection was brought under control, but the communists and their leftist allies took to the hills with the intention of repeating the pattern of Castro's rural guerrillas.

Carlos Andrés Pérez, later twice President of Venezuela, was Minister of the Interior during this time (1959-1964) and played a key role in the early Venezuelan government response to the guerrilla movement.
