= Council on Hemispheric Affairs =

United States-based NGO, founded in 1975

- Formation: 1975
- Type: Non-governmental organization
- Headquarters: Washington, D.C., U.S.
- Location: 2501 Calvert Street, N.W., Suite 401, Washington, D.C., U.S.
- Revenue: $95,702 (2016)
- Expenses: $105,400 (2016)
- Website: www.coha.org

The Council on Hemispheric Affairs (COHA) is a Washington, D.C.–based non-governmental organization (NGO) founded in 1975. The organization can draw on a large number of interns of graduate and undergraduate students, who gain experience in different fields additionally receiving academic credit from their home institutions. COHA also attracts retired government employees who support COHA in preparing monographs on a variety of topics including regional development, trade policies, and the international lending agencies' controversial development strategies. Further support is provided by a number of COHA senior research fellows of different nationalities including the United States and Latin America, who are experts in their respective fields of engagement.

== History ==
According to the group's website, the Council on Hemispheric Affairs was founded in 1975 to promote the common interests of the American hemisphere, to take regional issues into focus and to reinforce the importance of inter-American relations. One focus is the development of a constructive US policy towards the Latin American countries. COHA decided in 1982 to also observe Canada's relations with Latin America. Since its inception, the leadership of the COHA is made up of representatives of major trade unions, organizations, and religious groups, and also includes important civic and academic figures. COHA supports representative democracy and pluralistic institutions. COHA is non-partisan and is not part of political alliances. It supports open and democratic political processes and continues to condemn authoritarian regimes of whatever political orientation, that subject their populations to their own political agendas, curtailing economic growth and development, disregarding social justice and the right to physical integrity as well as withholding civil rights.

In the past, the COHA has expressed criticism of US policy towards Haiti, Cuba, Venezuela and of neo-liberal social reforms in Latin America. It also criticized that the US entered into the NAFTA with (Canada and) Mexico while Mexico was rife with endemic corruption, its institutions lacking true democracy and its trade unions lacking equality rights. Their credo was that it should have never been entered into until Mexican institutions were truly democratic, its trade unions could freely negotiate as equals, and the government had been cleansed of endemic corruption. COHA also continues to bring to light the random application of structural adjustments which badly affect the poorest of the poor of the Latin America population.

COHA has investigated issues such as unproductive U.S. pressure on President Aristide of Haiti which ended in him being overturned and Washington's installing an ill-fated interim regime in his place.

== Director ==
Larry Birns was the director of COHA from its founding in 1975 until his death in 2018. Birns was a former defense researcher, strategist, and member of the Institute for Strategic Studies in London, and a member of Oxford's All Souls College. Birns was also a senior grade public affairs officer for the United Nations Economic Commission for Latin America in Santiago, Chile during the Allende government. Birns taught and lectured for 15 years in the fields of Latin American studies, comparative government, and international law at a number of U.S. and British colleges and universities.

== Reception ==
The Boston Globe describes Birns as a lobbyist and a Leftist liberal critic of U.S. policy, and The New York Times says the Council on Hemispheric Affairs is a liberal research group specializing in United States-Latin America relations. The Los Angeles Times describes the COHA as a liberal think tank.

The Heritage Foundation stated that the Council on Hemispheric Affairs had a leftist positioning, would exaggerate negative publicity about right-wing governments in Latin America. The council was also described as a leftist lobby by Ofira Seliktar in Failing the Crystal Ball Test.

== Funding ==
The conservative Heritage Foundation has alleged the Council on Hemispheric Affairs was founded with assistance from Orlando Letelier and Richard Barnet of the progressive think tank, Institute for Policy Studies. It has been funded by the Judith Loeb Chiara Foundation.

== See also ==
- United States and South and Central America
