= Larry Birns =

American activist (1929–2018)

Larry Birns (born Lawrence Birns; July 22, 1929 – August 30, 2018) was the director of the Council on Hemispheric Affairs, a liberal, not-for-profit organization monitoring human rights and political developments in Latin America. Birns grew up in New York City, studied at Bates, and graduated from Columbia University, eventually doing postgraduate work in the social sciences at St. Catherine's College, Oxford University. Before founding the Council in 1975, Birns taught at Hamilton College and served with a United Nations mission in Chile during the Salvador Allende government.

The Boston Globe described Birns as an analyst and a liberal critic of U.S. policy, and The New York Times said the Council on Hemispheric Affairs was a liberal research group specializing in United States-Latin America relations, and an organization critical of Reagan Administration policy in Latin America. Birns also wrote commentary on Latin American and Caribbean affairs, for instance, contributing an afterword to Paul Farmer’s book The Uses of Haiti. In 1991, Birns delivered the 8th annual Ellsworth Lecture at Northern Vermont University.
