= El Barcelonazo =

1961 military uprising in Venezuela

- Part of the Venezuelan coups d'etat
Date	26 June 1961
Location	Barcelona, Venezuela
Result	Government victory

Belligerents
Government	Rebel units

Commanders and leaders
Rómulo Betancourt	Luis Alberto; Vivas Ramírez; Rubén Massó Perdomo; Tesalio Murillo

Casualties and losses
- Over 30 dead Over 50 wounded Rebel leaders arrested

El Barcelonazo was an attempted coup d'état against President Rómulo Betancourt's government that occurred in the Pedro María Freites Barracks in the city of Barcelona, Anzoátegui State on 26 June 1961.

== Background ==
The military conspiracy had been discovered a month before the uprising, and on 30 May, several of those involved had been arrested by the government.

== Details ==
The military took up arms at the Pedro María Freites Barracks and the Mariño Fusiliers Battalion at dawn, but they did not have the support of other parties. The government regained control and defeated the uprising. By 10:00 in the morning, the main soldiers were arrested.

== Results ==
The uprising left 30 people dead, above 50 injured and more than 100 arrested. Later, other movements arose in Ciudad Bolívar and La Guaira, the latter known as Guairazo, but they failed and their leaders were also arrested.

== See also ==
- El Carupanazo
- El Porteñazo
