= Armed Forces of National Liberation (Venezuela) =

1960s Venezuelan communist paramilitary formation

- Fuerzas Armadas de Liberación Nacional
- Other name: FALN
- Dates active: 1962 – 1969
- Ideology: Communism; Marxism-Leninism; Socialism; Left-wing nationalism; Proletarian internationalism
- Political position: Far-left

The Armed Forces of National Liberation (in Spanish: Fuerzas Armadas de Liberación Nacional, FALN) was a Venezuelan guerrilla group formed by the Communist Party of Venezuela to foment revolution against the governments of Rómulo Betancourt and Raul Leoni.

== Background ==
In 1958, Betancourt's Democratic Action (Acción Democrática, AD) party largely sidelined the left-wing, notably the Communist Party of Venezuela (Partido Comunista de Venezuela, PCV). The 1959 Cuban Revolution influenced PCV and student groups. Many leftist students formed the Revolutionary Left Movement (Movimiento de Izquierda Revolucionaria, MIR) in April 1960.

Betancourt's firm stance against Castro, especially Cuba's expulsion from the Organization of American States (OAS) led to bloody military uprisings in 1962, first at Carúpano on the Península of Paria, then at Puerto Cabello. After the unsuccessful revolts, Betancourt suspended civil liberties and arrested the MIR and PCV members of the forerunner to the National Assembly of Venezuela bicameral Congress in 1962. This drove the leftists underground and founded the FALN on 1 January 1963.

The FALN were engaged in rural and urban guerrilla activities, including seizure of the Venezuelan cargo ship Anzoátegui, kidnapping Real Madrid soccer star Alfredo Di Stéfano (both performed by Paul del Rio), sabotaging oil pipelines, kidnapping of American Colonel Michael Smolen, bombing a Sears Roebuck warehouse, and bombing the United States Embassy in Caracas. Despite their efforts, the FALN failed to rally the rural poor to their support and to disrupt the December 1963 elections.

Since the 1960's, Cuba sent military forces to Latin American, African and Arab countries. In 1966 and 1967, a small force of Cubans landed in the Venezuelan coast to support the guerrillas of the FALN.

The FALN fought through the Llanos of Venezuela and along the Colombian border near the city of San Cristóbal for many years. The president of Venezuela at the time, Raul Leoni, sent troops to fight against the guerrillas. General Rafael Sanchez Agüero eliminated the FALN in the state of Táchira in 1969. Alongside Colonel Arturo Julio Salazar.

== In popular culture ==
The 1975 film Chronicle of a Latin American Subversive (Spanish: Crónica de un subversivo latinoamericano) by director Mauricio Walerstein, narrates the real life FALN kidnapping of American Colonel Michael Smolen (portrayed as Colonel Robert Whitney by actor Claudio Brook) in revenge for Nguyen Van Troi's death sentence.

== See also ==
- Fuerzas Armadas de Liberación Nacional (Puerto Rico)
