= El Porteñazo =

1962 military rebellion in Venezuela

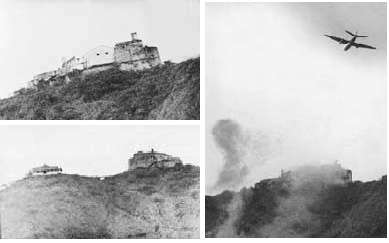
- Bombardment of the Solano Castle during the Porteñazo.
Date	2–6 June 1962
Location	Venezuela
Result	Government victory

Government-Insurgents
(Venezuela) Venezuelan government	(Venezuela) Military rebels

Commanders and leaders
(Venezuela) Rómulo Betancourt (Venezuela) Alfredo Monch (Venezuela) Ricardo Sosa Rios	(Venezuela) Manuel Ponte Rodríguez (Venezuela) Pedro Medina Silva (Venezuela) Víctor Hugo Morales

Military support
Armed Forces of Venezuela	Rebel forces

Casualties and losses
- 400+ dead and 700 injured

El Porteñazo (2 June 1962 – 6 June 1962) was a short-lived Communist military rebellion against the government of Rómulo Betancourt in Venezuela, in which rebels attempted to take over the city of Puerto Cabello, located ~75 miles (121 km) West of the capital Caracas. The rebellion was on a substantially larger scale than that of El Carupanazo a month earlier.

On 2 June 1962, units led by navy Captains Manuel Ponte Rodríguez, Pedro Medina Silva and Víctor Hugo Morales went into rebellion. The 55th National Guard Detachment declined to participate. The rebellion was crushed by 3 June, leaving more than 400 dead and 700 injured, and by 6 June the rebels' stronghold of Solano Castle had fallen.

A photograph of chaplain Luis María Padilla holding a wounded soldier during the rebellion won the 1963 Pulitzer Prize for Photography and 1962 World Press Photo of the Year for Héctor Rondón of La República.

== Testimonies ==
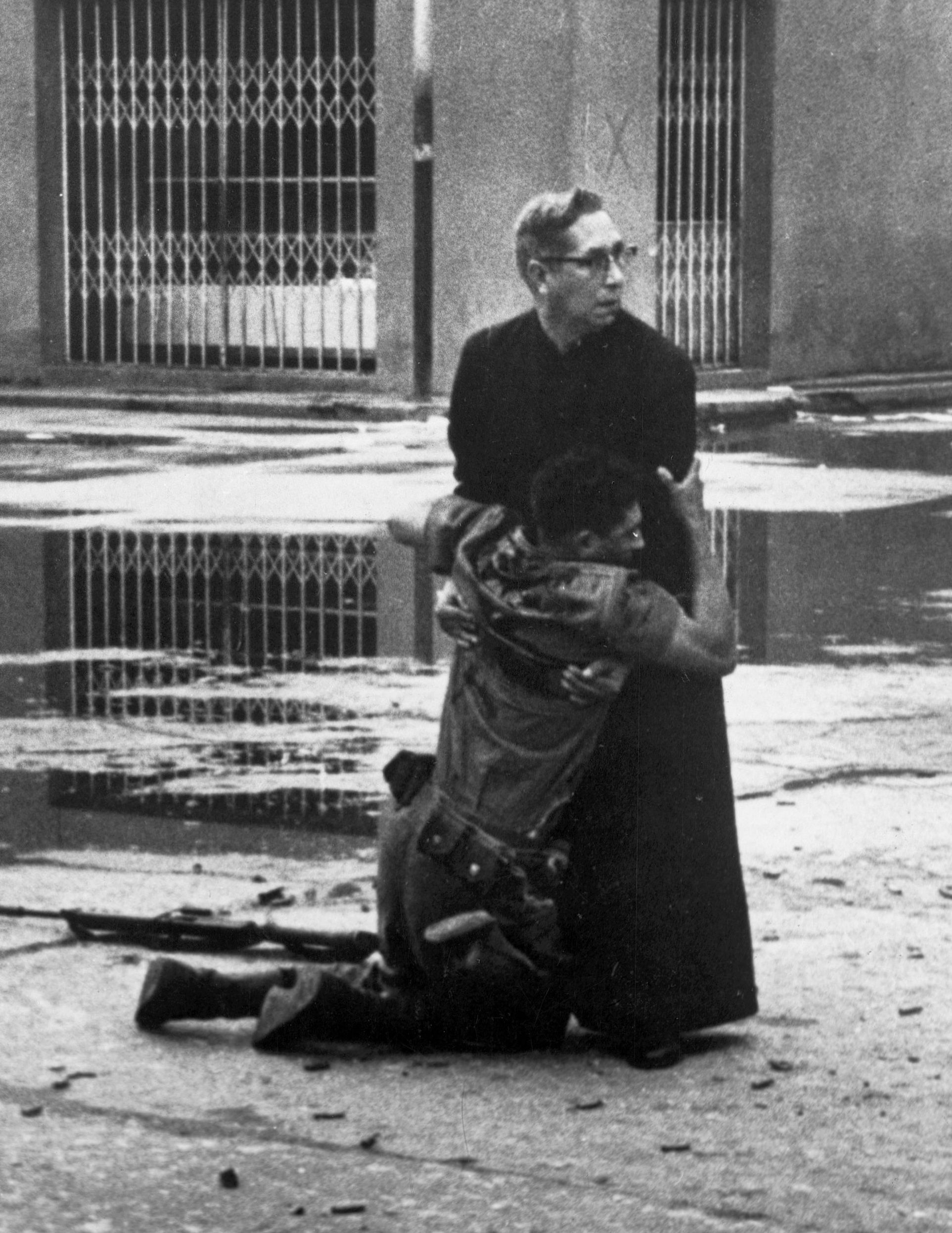
"Aid from the Padre", Héctor Rondón's Pulitzer Prize-winning photograph of a priest providing comfort to a wounded soldier during the fighting

Different stories retelling the event mourned Venezuela, taking the rebellion as an unjust and unnecessary act of war. Many reconciled what had happened according to their personal and political affiliations.

Alí Brett wrote, according to his investigation:

After 6am on Sunday the masonry of Solano Castle began receiving the impact of bombs. When the bombing began, we were in the neighbourhood "Las Tejerías" a few metres from the old fortress, which, for the first time in several centuries was a victim of an attack of this nature.

The fort was an enigma of the uprising and much was speculated about its power. All of the stories told of the advantages and strategic position of the "Black Burro" (a popular name for the antique cannon). People knowledgeable of this weapon know that if it was fired, even only once, Puerto Cabello would disappear.

Barely keeping up during the insurgency, the marines raised the Naval Base to guard the fort, whose inhabitants, by this day, Monday the 4th of June, were already dead. The presence of the executive officials and some military leaders clarified the mystery that had almost become the truth during the course of events, due to ill-founded stories.

He concludes his investigation by saying:

That the fort could be used as a point of operations for the rebels signifies one of the many known military errors of the event; after the appearance of the airplane as an element of war, these strengths were of no strategic effect.

== See also ==
- Second Presidency of Rómulo Betancourt#Internal unrest
- El Barcelonazo
- El Carupanazo
