= El Carupanazo =

1962 military uprising in Venezuela

Date	4 May 1962
Location	Carúpano, Venezuela
Result	Government victory

Government-Insurgents
(Venezuela) Venezuelan government	(Venezuela) Military rebels

Commanders and leaders
(Venezuela) Rómulo Betancourt	(Venezuela) Jesús Teodoro Molina Villegas (Venezuela) Pedro Vegas Castejón (Venezuela) Héctor Fleming Mendoza

Military support
Armed Forces of Venezuela	Rebel forces

Casualties and losses
- 56 dead 400 arrests

El Carupanazo was a short-lived military rebellion against the government of Rómulo Betancourt, in which rebel military officers commanding the Third Marine Infantry Battalion and the 77th National Guard Detachment took over the city of Carúpano in May 1962. The rebellion was followed a month later by another in Puerto Cabello, El Porteñazo.

== Rebellion ==
At around midnight on 4 May 1962, military officers in rebellion against the government of Rómulo Betancourt took over the city of Carúpano. The insurgents, under control of Captain Jesús Teodoro Molina Villegas, Major Pedro Vegas Castejòn, and Lieutenant Héctor Fleming Mendoza, occupied the city's streets and buildings, the airport, and the radio station, Radio Carúpano, which they used to broadcast their message, calling themselves the Movimiento de Recuperación Democrática (Movement of Democratic Recuperation).

President Betancourt demanded that the rebels surrender, but at the same he ordered the air force to attack the city and the navy began blocking the seaport in an operation called Operacion Tenaza. The following day, the government was able to take over Carúpano and its surroundings, arresting more than 400 military personnel and civilians that were involved in the rebellion.

Those involved were Congressman Eloy Torres of the Communist Party of Venezuela (PCV), as well as other members of that party and the Movimiento de Izquierda Revolucionaria (MIR). As a result, Betancourt suspended constitutional guarantees, accused the PCV and MIR of being involved, and decreed both parties as illegal.

== See also ==
- Second Presidency of Rómulo Betancourt#Internal unrest
- El Barcelonazo
- El Porteñazo
