= Protests in Venezuela =

Various protests occurred against governments in Venezuela in the twentieth century.

== History ==
=== Juan Vicente Gómez dictatorship ===
After the surrender of the German Empire, the Caracas population celebrated in the streets the end of World War I on 15 November 1918. University students, journalists and writers participated in the demonstrations, which passed in front of the headquarters of the legations of France, United Kingdom, Belgium, Italy and the United States and headed to Bolívar Square. Although the prefect of Caracas assured Vicente Gómez that the demonstrators consisted only of "boys, men of the people, drivers", among others, the demonstration was dissolved by the police and its leaders were arrested by order of Juan Vicente Gómez. The same month the student and dissident Gustavo Machado leads a demonstration in favor of Belgium that sought to condemn the pro-German attitude assumed by Juan Vicente Gómez.

During the dictatorship of Juan Vicente Gómez, a group of students later dubbed as the Generation of 1928 led protests in 1928 in the capital city of Caracas. Many politicians prominent in Venezuela's transition to democracy took part in the protests. They include Rómulo Betancourt, Jóvito Villalba, Juan Oropeza, Joaquín Gabaldón Márquez, Raúl Leoni, Andrés Eloy Blanco, Miguel Otero Silva, Pedro Sotillo, Francisco Ignacio Romero, Isaac J Pardo, Juan Bautista Fuenmayor, Germán Suárez Flamerich, Iván Darío Maldonado Bello, Gustavo Machado, and Antonia Palacios.

Several members of the Generation went into exile. Political organizations in exile included the founding of Agrupación Revolucionaria de Izquierda (ARDI) in Colombia in 1931 by Rómulo Betancourt and others. This later became the Partido Democrático Nacional, a forerunner of Democratic Action. The Communist Party of Venezuela, also founded in 1931, was initially led by Francisco José "Kotepa" Delgado and Juan Bautista Fuenmayor.

=== Eleazar López Contreras administration ===
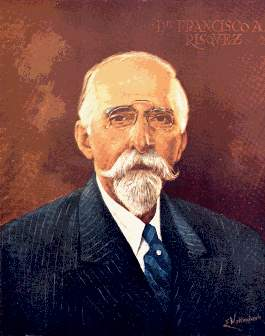
Francisco Antonio Risquez, rector of the Central University of Venezuela and one of the leaders of the February 1936 march.

After Juan Vicente Gómez's death on 17 December 1935, the Congress entrusted the interim presidency to the Minister of War and Navy, Eleazar López Contreras. He was a moderate gomecista, reason why he was received with sympathy upon his arrival in Caracas. On 28 January 1936, the governor of the Federal District, Félix Galavís, created a Censorship Office in the governor's office. On 12 February, Governor Galavís issues a decree of censorship over the media, press and radio.

Around 15,000 to 20,000 people marched from the Bolivar Square in Caracas on their way to the Miraflores Palace. Shortly after arriving at the square, the demonstration was broken up with a three-minute burst of gunfire. The shots left 6 dead and 150 wounded.

Félix Galavís was attributed with the order to shoot, although he denied responsibility. Subsequently, looting was unleashed, mainly against known Gomecistas. One hundred houses and businesses were destroyed, and close relatives of Juan Vicente Gómez left Venezuela on a ship to Curaçao.

The Student Federation of Venezuela organized a demonstration that left from the Central University of Venezuela (UCV) in the afternoon, headed by the rector of the university, Francisco Antonio Rísquez, opposition leaders and student and union leaders of Caracas. The demonstrators protested against censorship and demanded the departure of the Gomecistas from power and democratization. The march stopped in front of the Miraflores Palace and a commission met with President Eleazar López Contreras. After the meeting, López Contreras agreed to revoke the suspension of constitutional guarantees within 15 days and to punish those responsible for the deaths that occurred that morning.

The newspaper La Esfera published an article stating that the march led by Rector Antonio Rísquez was "the most important civic demonstration ever held in our country".

During his first year as president, López Contreras also faced a labor strike that paralyzed the oil industry in Zulia state, in western Venezuela, where the most productive fields were located. His representative there from the labor ministry, Carlos Ramírez MacGregor, made a report of the situation, which confirmed the workers’ grievances. The strike was declared illegal and government forces made the workers return to their jobs, although after that incident the oil companies started taking serious initiatives to improve conditions for Venezuelan workers.

=== Marcos Pérez Jiménez dictatorship ===
One of the first public demonstrations against the dictatorship of Marcos Pérez Jiménez occurred on 1952, after the assassination of opposition leader Leonardo Ruiz Pineda. During a commemorative ceremony in Nuevo Circo, Caracas, hundreds of people waved handkerchiefs during a minute of silence asked in his honor.

On 27 March 1957, Aaron Copland had come to Caracas to conduct the first Venezuelan performance of his Lincoln Portrait. A New York Times reviewer said it had a "magical effect" on the audience. As Copland recalled, "To everyone's surprise, the reigning dictator, who had rarely dared to be seen in public, arrived at the last possible moment." On that evening actress Juana Sujo performed the spoken-word parts of the piece. When she spoke the final words, "...that government of the people, by the people, for the people (del pueblo, por el pueblo y para el pueblo) shall not perish from the earth", the audience rose and began cheering and shouting so loudly that Copland could not hear the remainder of the music."

Following massive public demonstrations in support of democratic reforms, Pérez Jiménez was deposed in a coup perpetrated by disgruntled sectors within the Armed Forces of Venezuela on 23 January 1958. Pérez Jiménez left the country, paving the way for the establishment of democracy in Venezuela.

=== Lusinchi presidency ===
Unprecedented protests against the government of Jaime Lusinchi occurred during a period of economic turmoil when the 1980s oil glut affected Venezuela's economy, resulting with increased poverty, inflation and shortages of basic goods. Many citizens believed that the two-party system established in the Puntofijo Pact was no longer democratic and that the government grew less transparent as the nation's financial state grew worse. The economic decline saw increased student protests against the Lusinchi government and Democratic Action, which accused demonstrators of destabilization attempts and deployed troops to crackdown on dissent. Protests grew more severe in response to the repression by authorities, with citizen marches, university strikes, the Confederación de Trabajadores de Venezuela and local leaders of the Catholic Church condemning the government.

The Lusinchi government announced austerity measures on 27 February 1986, saying "I am convinced that the normalization of relations with our foreign creditors solves an important obstacle in the country's affairs and clears the way for economic recovery." Weeks later on 11 March 1986, about 4,000 protesters marched in Caracas, criticizing the government's promise of economic recovery. Following the detention of seventeen students protesting against increased bus prices in Cumaná in May 1986, nationwide protests were organized in support of the arrested students the following year.

Between 13 and 15 March 1987, students in Mérida began large scale protests after a student who recently graduated was killed by an attorney linked to the police shot the student for allegedly urinating near his home. The March 1987 protests in Mérida resulted with $2 million in damages and the arrests of 180 people, who were transported to be imprisoned at the El Dorado prison. Protests were then banned in Caracas by Lusinchi, which fueled further dissent at the Central University of Venezuela and led to protests on 19 March 1987; police fired tear gas at the demonstration, 20 were injured and one university security guard died of a heart attack. Central University students clashed with police again on 30 April 1987 and thirty individuals were reported injured; the government blamed the violence on left-wing groups, reporting that students stole over a dozen buses and used makeshift weapons to attack authorities following the rise of bus fares. On 2 July 1987, student protests began in the cities of Mérida, San Cristobal and Trujillo, resulting with one dead student in Trujillo, sixteen injured and over one hundred people arrested. In Mérida, looting occurred and government offices were set ablaze. The Lusinchi government deployed 300 troops to Mérida and Trujillo. The following day, over 1,000 students at the Central University of Venezuela began demonstrations in response to the death of the student in Trujillo, with the government reporting that five police officers were injured by gunfire from "professional agitators." On 5 July 1987, Lusinchi made an address on Independence Day, accusing protesters of being involved in a plot to destabilize the nation. By the end of July 1987, two protesters were dead and 73 were injured.

A university strike began in January 1988 when faculty demanded wage increases to counter the 40% inflation rate of 1987. The Lusinchi government also began to attack press freedom after his controversial affair with his mistress Blanca Ibáñez began to be disseminated by the media, with journalists being forced into self-censorship and a popular radio host having their program shut down by the government. On 21 January 1988, more than 2,000 press workers participated in a march in Caracas to protest against the censorship of the Lusinchi government.

=== Andrés Pérez presidency ===
Shortly after taking office in early 1989, President Carlos Andrés Pérez reversed from his position of strongly criticizing the International Monetary Fund (IMF) and instead accepted the IMF's recommendations. He instituted neoliberal economic policies prescribed by the Washington Consensus, which included the adoption of austerity measures and implementing shock therapy on the economy. The distance between the impoverished populace and the ruling elite, according to Strønen, led to dissent from citizens. Shortly after Pérez's unveiling of the economic measures, economist Héctor Silva Michelena said that a "grave social explosion" was imminent.

Anti-neoliberal protests occurred in mid-February 1989, denouncing Pérez's economic proposals. Larger protests and rioting began on the morning of 27 February 1989 in Guarenas, a town in Miranda State about 30 kilometres (19 mi) east of Caracas, due to the increase in public transportation prices. Protests then spread to Caracas and nationwide. Rioters destroyed properties indiscriminately, with no motives related to initial protests, and many had to line up at government food distribution centers since markets were destroyed by rioters. Pérez dismissed the first protests and warnings from multiple ministers throughout the day, choosing to fly to Barquisimeto for a meeting of the Venezuelan Executives Association and describing news footage of looting occurring as outdated. While meeting with the business executives, Pérez told his audience, "There is nothing to be alarmed about, ... We are going to take advantage of the crisis to generate well-being."

Venezuelan anthropologist Fernando Coronil described the Caracazo as "the largest and most violently repressed revolt against austerity measures in Latin American history." According to Amnesty International and the Inter-American Court of Human Rights (IACHR), tactics used by security forces included enforced disappearances, the use of torture, and extrajudicial killings. Members of the National Directorate of Intelligence and Prevention Services (DISIP) were reported to have beaten protesters with baseball bats and pipes while they performed interrogations. The IACHR said that a "disproportionate use of force" was especially used in impoverished areas. Poor areas faced increased violence during the riots, with authorities firing indiscriminately throughout neighborhoods and dragging some individuals out of their homes for summary executions. By the time protesting ended on 5 March 1989, the initial official pronouncements stated that 276 people had died, though the Pérez administration attempted to block investigations. Of the deaths, two soldiers and one police officer were reported dead. After hundreds of unmarked graves were found in the following months, many estimates put the number at above 2,000 and up to 5,000.Shortages of coffins were reported and morgues were so overfilled with dead that workers had to explain to family members searching for loved ones that bodies were simply discarded in trash bags.

=== Caldera presidency ===
Through the 1990s, Chávez's MBR-200 participated in anti-austerity protests. Pérez's successor, Rafael Caldera, pardoned Chávez for his actions in 1994. MBR-200, Radical Cause and Movement Towards Socialism consolidated their political objectives into the Fifth Republic Movement, with Chávez winning the 1998 Venezuelan presidential election.

=== Nicolás Maduro administration ===
In 2014, a series of protests, political demonstrations, and civil insurrection began in Venezuela due to the country's high levels of urban violence, inflation, and chronic shortages of basic goods and services. Explanations for these worsening conditions vary, with analysis blaming strict price controls, alongside long-term, widespread political corruption resulting in the under-funding of basic government services. While protests first occurred in January, after the murder of actress and former Miss Venezuela Mónica Spear, the 2014 protests against Nicolás Maduro began in earnest that February following the attempted rape of a student on a university campus in San Cristóbal. Subsequent arrests and killings of student protesters spurred their expansion to neighboring cities and the involvement of opposition leaders. The year's early months were characterized by large demonstrations and violent clashes between protesters and government forces that resulted in nearly 4,000 arrests and 43 deaths, including both supporters and opponents of the government. Toward the end of 2014, and into 2015, continued shortages and low oil prices caused renewed protesting.

By 2016, protests occurred following the controversy surrounding the 2015 parliamentary elections as well as the incidents surrounding the 2016 recall referendum. On 1 September 2016, one of the largest demonstration of the protests occurred, gathered to demand a recall election against President Maduro. Following the suspension of the recall referendum by the government-leaning National Electoral Council (CNE) on 21 October 2016, the opposition organized another protest which was held on 26 October 2016, with hundreds of thousands participating while the opposition said 1.2 million participated. After some of the largest protests occurred in a late-2016, Vatican-mediated dialogue between the opposition and government was attempted and ultimately failed in January 2017. Concentration on protests subsided in the first months of 2017 until the 2017 constitutional crisis occurred when the pro-government Supreme Tribunal of Justice of Venezuela attempted to assume the powers of the opposition-led National Assembly and removed their immunity. Though the move was partially reversed days later, demonstrations grew "into the most combative since a wave of unrest in 2014".

During the 2017 Venezuelan protests, the Mother of all Protests involved from 2.5 million to 6 million protesters. The 2019 protests began in early January after the National Assembly declared the May 2018 presidential elections invalid and declared Juan Guaidó acting president, resulting in a presidential crisis. The majority of protests have been peaceful, consisting of demonstrations, sit-ins, and hunger strikes, although small groups of protesters have been responsible for attacks on public property, such as government buildings and public transportation. Erecting improvised street barricades, dubbed guarimbas, were a controversial form of protest in 2014. Although initially protests were mainly performed by the middle and upper classes, lower class Venezuelans became involved as the situation in Venezuela deteriorated. Nicolas Maduro's government characterized the protests as an undemocratic coup d'etat attempt, which was orchestrated by "fascist" opposition leaders and the United States, blaming capitalism and speculation for causing high inflation rates and goods scarcities as part of an "economic war" being waged on his government. Although Maduro, a former trade union leader, has said he supported peaceful protesting, the Venezuelan government has been widely condemned for its handling of the protests. Venezuelan authorities have gone beyond the use of rubber pellets and tear gas to instances of live ammunition use and torture of arrested protesters according to organizations like Amnesty International and Human Rights Watch, while the United Nations has accused the Venezuelan government of politically motivated arrests, most notably former Chacao mayor and leader of Popular Will, Leopoldo López, who has used the controversial charges of murder and inciting violence against him to protest the government's "criminalization of dissent". Other controversies reported during the protests include media censorship and violence by pro-government militant groups known as colectivos.

On 23 January 2019, El Tiempo revealed a protest count, showing over 50,000 registered protests in Venezuela since 2013. In 2020, organized protests against Maduro had largely subsided, especially due to the COVID-19 pandemic in Venezuela.

== See also ==
- Protests against Nicolás Maduro
- Protests in South Africa
- List of incidents of civil unrest in France
