= Student politics in Venezuela =

National occurrence of student politics

Student politics in Venezuela is the collection of students, largely university students, from across Venezuela participating in activism and developing political opinions. In Venezuela, student politicians hold a much larger clout than in many other countries, and many go on to be successful lawmakers in the nation.

== History ==
Profiling student politics in Venezuela in 1959, S. Walter Washington wrote that the interest in politics is something the students "inherited from their forebears in Europe, especially in Spain, where for centuries students have played prominent roles in the fight for human rights", adding that "tyrannical governments" in Latin America encourage the students to be more political than they ever were in Europe.^{:463} The power of student politics was summarised by Washington as a result of their power to vocalise emotions of the nation that working people are too scared to. Already in this early year, it was noted that student politicians in Venezuela held "special weight".^{:463} Washington puts this down to three main reasons: that Latin Americans have respect for education; that student demographics were changing and wanted social reform more hastily; and that over 70% of Venezuelans were under 30, making the student politicians more credible and relatable than their decades-older counterparts.^{:463}

=== 19th century ===
During the Venezuelan War of Independence, in the battle of La Victoria, royalist forces under José Tomás Boves tried to take the city of La Victoria, held by General José Félix Ribas. The battle was fought on 12 February 1814. Given the shortage of regular troops, Ribas had to arm a thousand students from colleges and seminaries in the city and other neighboring towns, including 85 students of the Seminary of Santa Rosa de Lima, Caracas. Before going into battle, General Ribas addressed the youths who accompanied him, ending with these words:

Soldiers: What we have desired will be held today: behold Boves. Five times larger than the military brings to fight us; but it still seems insufficient to dispute our win. You defend the fury of tyrants the lives of your children, the honor of your wives, the soil of the homeland; show our omnipotence. For this day to be memorable, we cannot choose between victory or death: it is necessary to overcome! Long live the Republic!

The battle began at seven in the morning and lasted all day on the streets of the city. Republican troops built an impressive resistance to push the royalist troops at that time led by Francisco Tomás Morales. By late afternoon, victory had not yet gone to either side. While the fighting raged, the Patriots received a reinforcement of 220 troopers under Vicente Campo Elías, from San Mateo, that effectively broke the siege. Hours later, Morales and his men withdrew combat horsemen pursued by Republicans. Result of this battle fails realistic attempt to cut communications between Caracas and Valencia.

Bolivar, knowing victory Ribas granted the title of "Winner of the Tyrants".

On 12 February 1947, the Constituent Assembly decreed that Venezuela would celebrate each anniversary of the battle as Youth Day, in honor of the young people who achieved this important victory. In Victoria's main square there is a sculptural group made by Eloy Palacios, erected in 1895, representing Ribas showing a youth how to use a rifle.

=== 20th century ===
The Generation of 1928 (Spanish: Generación del 28) was a group of students who led protests in Caracas in 1928 against the dictatorship of Juan Vicente Gómez. Many politicians prominent in Venezuela's transition to democracy took part in the protests, including Rómulo Betancourt, Jóvito Villalba, Juan Oropeza, Joaquin Gabaldon Marquez, Raúl Leoni, Andrés Eloy Blanco, Miguel Otero Silva, Pedro Sotillo, Francisco Ignacio Romero, Isaac J Pardo, Juan Bautista Fuenmayor, Germán Suárez Flamerich, and Gustavo Machado, and Antonia Palacios.

After the 1928 protests a number of the Generation of 1928 were arrested or went into exile. Political organizations in exile included the founding of Agrupación Revolucionaria de Izquierda (ARDI) in Colombia in 1931 by Rómulo Betancourt and others. This later became the Partido Democrático Nacional, a forerunner of Democratic Action. The Communist Party of Venezuela, also founded in 1931, was initially led by Francisco José "Kotepa" Delgado and Juan Bautista Fuenmayor.

== Post—2007 ==
=== 2007 ===
In May 2007, several student politicians founded the Movimiento Estudiantil (English: The Student Movement), prompted by the cancellation of the television channel RCTV. Harvard University's ReVista wrote that whilst many people of the nation were outraged, Hugo Chávez's "decision not to renew the network's license activated a student opposition movement that had been largely dormant up until then". Unlike other television channels in Venezuela, RCTV remained critical of Chávez throughout his presidency; despite being the nation's oldest and most viewed station, Chávez was willing to take the risk to turn it off. In doing so, he gained a powerful student opposition, though groups of students who supported Chávez - the Presidential Student Commission - did form in response to this.

Both the opposition Movimiento Estudiantil and the supportive Presidential Student Commission started at Andrés Bello Catholic University when students at the Caracas campus closed all the entrances and began rioting, prompting nationwide action by students for over a week. The opposition student movement is credited with changing national opinion and giving Chávez his first electoral loss.

Though student politics is, in many cases, focused on student issues, the 2007 student movement began with asking for freedom of expression. In 2008, the Harvard ReVista suggested that the students rose to prominence because of a lack of credible political opposition in the country, tackling wide-ranging issues, and because they had "no seeming interest in elected office", though many of this generation would go on to become politicians (members of the pro-Chávez group highly criticized the opposition students for this, despite some of their members joining Chávez's administration).

The 2007 generation, led by many individuals, may have Yon Goicoechea as its most-remembered student politician, both for being "the face of the student movement" and subsequently then for controversially winning and accepting the Milton Friedman Prize for Advancing Liberty in early 2008. Outside of Venezuela, the Movimiento Estudiantil founding member Juan Guaidó, who rose to international prominence as a key player in the 2019 Venezuelan presidential crisis, may be more remembered.

=== 2014 ===
After Chávez's death in 2013, and the contested election of Nicolás Maduro, the next generation of student politics began. The actions of this group took force in 2014 during the nationwide protests. This word became used often in 2015 and Venezuelan slang to refer to any opposition protest.

== List of student politicians ==
Name	Years	Institution	Affiliation
Tareck El Aissami	Late 1990s	University of the Andes	Pro-government
Manuela Bolívar	?-2007	Andrés Bello Catholic University (UCAB)	Opposition
Francisco Brandt	2007	Universidad Metropolitana	Opposition
Fabricio Briceño	2007		Opposition
Miguel Cáceres	2007-?	UCV	Pro-government
Yon Goicoechea	2007-13	UCAB	Opposition
Stalin González	2007-10	UCV	Opposition
Juan Guaidó	?-2007	UCAB	Opposition
Freddy Guevara	2007-?	UCAB	Opposition
Francisco Márquez	2007-?	UCAB	n/a
Miguel Pizarro	2007-10	Central University of Venezuela (UCV)	Opposition
Juan Requesens	2007-14	UCV	Opposition
Rafaela Requesens	2017–present	UCV	Opposition
Héctor Rodríguez	2007		Pro-government
Ricardo Sánchez Mujica	2007-10	UCV	Opposition, later pro-government
Robert Serra	2007-?	UCAB	Pro-government
Héctor Rodríguez			Pro-government
