= Politics of Venezuela =

The politics of Venezuela are conducted under what is nominally a federal presidential republic, but is in practice an authoritarian dictatorial government. Prior to the early 1990s, Venezuela was considered an unusually long-standing and stable liberal democracy in Latin America, having transitioned to democracy in 1958. According to the V-Dem Democracy indices Venezuela was in 2023 the third least electoral democratic country in Latin America.

After the victory of socialist populist Hugo Chávez in the 1998 presidential election, Venezuela gradually underwent democratic backsliding before transitioning to an authoritarian system of government where political and civil rights are not protected, and elections are not free and fair. Under Chávez's rule and later under the rule of his successor Nicolás Maduro, power has been concentrated in the hands of the executive, institutional checks and balances have been undermined, independent media have been repressed, and opposition forces have been marginalized in governing institutions, such as congress, courts, oversight agencies, the state-owned petroleum company (PDVSA), and the military.

Politics are polarized between supporters of Maduro, organized as the United Socialist Party (PSUV) and the Great Patriotic Pole, and several opposition parties. Opposition parties and opposition candidates have regularly been banned from contesting elections. At other times, opposition parties have boycotted national elections, citing their undemocratic nature.

The PSUV was created in 2007, uniting a number of smaller parties supporting Chávez's Bolivarian Revolution with his Fifth Republic Movement. PSUV and its forerunners have held the presidency since 1998, and the legislature during most of that time. The Democratic Unity Roundtable (Mesa de la Unidad Democrática, MUD), created in 2008, unites much of the opposition (A New Era (UNT), Project Venezuela, Justice First, Movement for Socialism (Venezuela) and others). Chávez died in office in early 2013 and was succeeded by Maduro (initially as interim President, before narrowly winning the 2013 Venezuelan presidential election).

== Parties and leaders ==
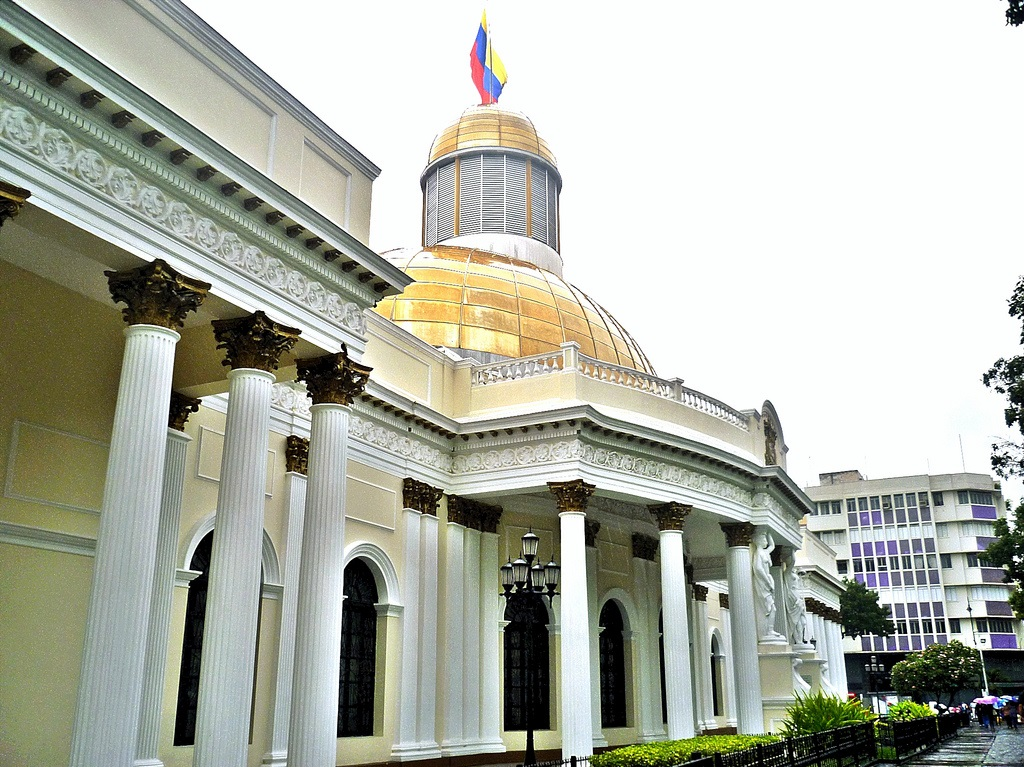
National Assembly building

=== Governing party ===
United Socialist Party of Venezuela or PSUV – (Nicolás Maduro, now taken to the United States), partially recognized. Currently, as a result of Nicolás Maduro’s arrest on January 3 (2026), the United States (more specifically, the Trump administration) “governs the country” backing interim President Delcy Rodríguez (PSUV) as Venezuela’s highest executive authority (which has made her a highly unpopular figure not recognized by most opposition parties, notably Come Venezuela or VV).

This situation may change with future presidential elections (with supervision of the international community, mostly United States), in which the Venezuelan opposition leader (and 2025 Nobel Peace Prize laureate) María Corina Machado (VV) could run for office.

=== Non-governing parties ===
- A New Time or UNT – (Manuel Rosales)
- Brave People's Alliance or ABP – (Richard Blanco)
- Christian Democrats or COPEI – (Antonio Sotillo Luna)
- Coalition of opposition parties (including VV) –The Democratic Unity Platform or PUD – (Edmundo González Urrutia and María Corina Machado)
- Communist Party of Venezuela or PCV – (Oscar Figuera)
- Democratic Action or AD – (Henry Ramos Allup)
- Fatherland for All or PPT – (Rafael Uzcategui)
- For Social Democracy or PODEMOS – (Didalco Antonio Bolivar Groterol)
- Justice First or PJ – (Julio Borges)
- Movement Toward Socialism or MAS – (Segundo Melendaz)
- Popular Will or VP – (Leopoldo Lopez)
- Progressive Wave or AP – (Henri Falcon)
- The Radical Cause or La Causa R – (Americo De Grazia)
- Venezuelan Progressive Movement or MPV – (Simon Calzadilla)
- Venezuela Project or PV – (Henrique Fernando Salas Feo)

== History ==
Venezuelan politics was characterized by military rule for much of its post-independence history. From independence until 1956, Venezuela had 24 constitutions. These constitutions were frequently established by winners after successful revolts.

Romulo Gallegos's election as president in 1947 made him the first freely elected president in Venezuela's history. He was removed from power by military officers in the 1948 Venezuelan coup.

=== 1958–1999 ===
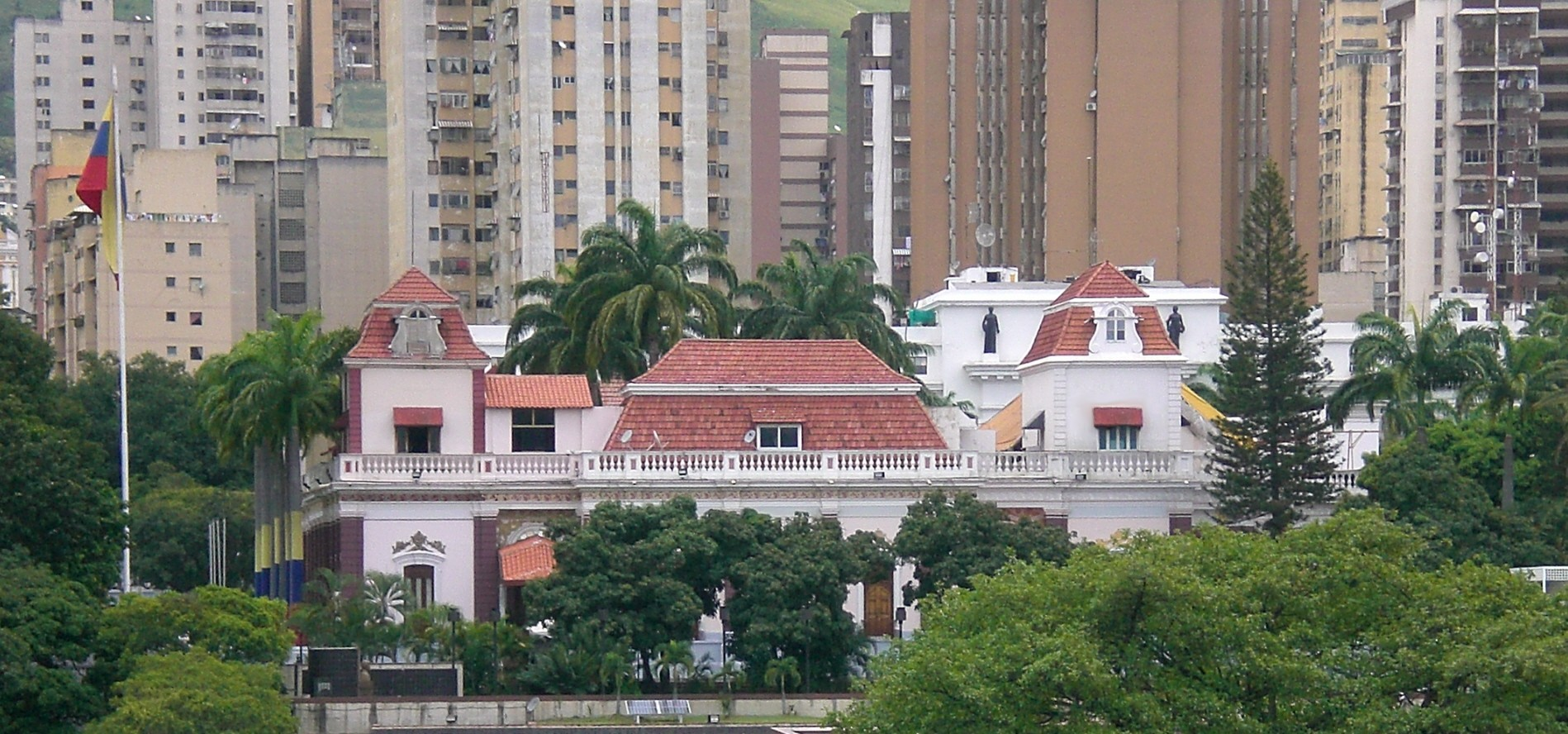
Miraflores Palace, seat of the executive power

Background to the current political landscapes is the development of democracy in Venezuela during the twentieth century, in which Democratic Action (AD^{x} or Acción Democrática in Spanish, founded in 1941) and its predecessors played an important role in the early years. Democratic Action led the government during Venezuela's first democratic period (1945–1948). After an intervening decade of dictatorship (1948–1958) and the fall of dictator Marcos Pérez Jiménez saw AD^{x} excluded from power, four Venezuelan presidents came from Democratic Action from the 1960s to the 1990s. This period, known as the "Fourth Republic", is marked by the development of the 1958 Punto Fijo Pact between the major parties (originally including the Democratic Republican Union, which later dwindled in significance).

By the end of the 1990s, however, the now two-party system's credibility was almost nonexistent. This was mostly because of the corruption and poverty that Venezuelans experienced as oil wealth poured in during the 1970s and the debt crisis developed during the 1980s. Democratic Action's last president (Carlos Andrés Pérez) was impeached for corruption in 1993 and spent two years under house arrest as a result. The other main traditional party Copei, provided two Venezuelan presidents (Rafael Caldera, 1969–1974, and Luis Herrera Campins, 1979–1983). Confidence in the traditional parties collapsed enough that Rafael Caldera won the 1993 presidential election with about 30% of the vote, representing a new electoral coalition National Convergence. By 1998, support for Democratic Action and COPEI had fallen still further, and Hugo Chávez, a political outsider, won the 1998 election.

=== 1999–2013 ===
Chávez launched what he called the "Bolivarian Revolution" and fulfilled an election promise by calling a Constituent Assembly in 1999, which drafted the new Constitution of Venezuela. Chávez was granted executive power by the National Assembly to rule by decree multiple times throughout his tenure, passing hundreds of laws. Chávez ruled Venezuela by decree in 2000, 2001, 2004, 2005, 2006, 2007, 2008, 2010, 2011 and 2012. The United Socialist Party of Venezuela (Partido Socialista Unido de Venezuela, PSUV) was created in 2007, uniting a number of smaller parties supporting Hugo Chávez's Bolivarian Revolution with Chávez's Fifth Republic Movement. The Democratic Unity Roundtable (Mesa de la Unidad Democrática, MUD), created in 2008, united much of the opposition (A New Era (UNT), Project Venezuela, Justice First, Movement for Socialism (Venezuela) and others). In 2008, the government expelled the US-based Human Rights Watch, which was criticizing the government's Human rights record. Hugo Chávez, the central figure of the Venezuelan political landscape since his election to the presidency in 1998 as a political outsider, died in office in early 2013 after a long struggle with cancer. Nearing his death, Chávez expressed his intention that his vice president would succeed him. Chavez was succeeded by Nicolás Maduro, his vice president, initially as interim President, before he narrowly won the 2013 Venezuelan presidential election.

=== 2013–Present ===
Nicolás Maduro was president of Venezuela from 2013 to early 2026 (captured). His rule was marked by a continuation of Bolivarian socialist populist policies, but also by a severe economic crisis -- hyperinflation (53,798,500% between 2016 and April 2019), escalating hunger, disease, crime and mortality rates, and mass emigration (almost 5 million from the country in 2019 and 7.9 million in late 2025). Extrajudicial killings of opposition by government forces are reported (by the United Nations) to include 6800 deaths as of 2019.

The crisis has been variously blamed on low oil prices in early 2015; on an "economic war" on Venezuelan socialism waged by international sanctions, and the country's business elite; and on "years of economic mismanagement, and corruption", including a lack of maintenance and investment in oil production.

==== 2013 ====
On 14 April 2013 elections were held between Nicolás Maduro and Henrique Capriles Radonski, opposition leader and co founder of the political party, Primero Justicia. The Venezuelan election agency announced that Maduro won with 50.8 percent of the vote, the smallest presidential win margin since the 1968 election. Opposition forces said that Henrique Capriles Radonski actually won by close to 300,000 votes and proposed evidence of voter fraud. Capriles demanded a recount that in June reaffirmed Maduro as the victor. These results sparked subsequent demonstrations and protests by those who said the recount process was also illegitimate. Maduro and his government responded with suppression of the opposition that resulted in hundreds of arrests, that Maduro claimed to be in defense of a coup he was facing.

Maduro attempted to continue the Chavismo policies. Like Chávez, Nicolás Maduro has ruled by decree multiple times since he was elected in April 2013. President Maduro has ruled Venezuela by decree for the majority of the period from 19 November 2013 through 2017. Maduro has not achieved the same level of popularity that Chávez had during his presidency, demonstrated by the narrow early presidential election win. Many attribute Maduro's failure to continue the same populism model successfully to his lack of charisma that Chávez capitalized on. Chávez's opposition reported to still have large love and respect for Chávez during his presidency, Eric Olsen, deputy director of the Latin American Program at the Wilson Center reports. Olsen notes that this was not the same case with Maduro, who clearly lacks the same amount of captivating characteristics.

==== 2015 ====
2015 was a strong year for the MUD opposition, taking two-thirds of the congressional sets, a super majority. This was the first time in 16 years that PSUV did not have the majority in congress and this was not due to low voter turnout, as it was at 74.3%. Henrique Capriles a former MUD presidential candidate and the opposition coalition leader, Jesus Torrealba marked this as a change in the nation's history encouraging celebration with Torrealba stating, "Venezuela wanted a change and that change came. A new majority expressed itself and sent a clear and resounding message." Maduro stated in his televised response, "We have come with our morality and our ethics to recognize these adverse results, to accept them and to tell our Venezuela, The Constitution and democracy have triumphed", and later said "In Venezuela the opposition has not won ... For now, a counterrevolution that is at our doorstep has won".

==== 2017 ====
The strong performance by the opposition led to the reduction of the legislative powers due to the judiciary's increased scope and politicization. The Supreme Tribunal of Justice (TSJ), controlled by the PSUV, invalidated three deputies' elections from the opposition. When this ruling was not accepted by the Assembly, its powers were stripped. By 2017, the old legislative body was dismissed and transformed into the New Constituent National Assembly. This was similar to the Constituent Assembly in 1999, having power to change the constitution and dismantle pre-existing officials and/or the bodies themselves. The members of the Constituent Assembly were chosen in July 2017, during elections that were largely boycotted by the opposition, with accusations of illegitimacy.

==== 2020 ====
In 2020, news reports described a loosening of many socialist/redistributive economic policies—price and currency controls, stringent labor laws—by the Maduro government, along with an rapprochement with members of the capitalist community—especially Lorenzo Mendoza of the Empresas Polar conglomerate who is no longer denounced as a "thief," a "parasite" and a "traitor". Changes such as the return of agricultural land and "dozens of companies" to private management have allowed the government to survive economic sanctions (though economic production and employment is still greatly reduced), and have proceeded in exchange for an abandonment of political opposition by Mendoza. Another result of the economic liberalization is that erstwhile socialist allies of Maduro's government who began to protest corruption and the "extravagant lives flaunted by the government's cronies in supermarkets stocked with expensive imports and luxury car showrooms", have become victims to the same security apparatus that have attacked Maduro's opponents on the right—they have been denounced as traitors, arrested (leaders of the Communist and Tupamaro parties), beaten and sometimes assassinated (the fate of radio host José Carmelo Bislick).

== Miscellaneous ==
Venezuela abolished the death penalty in 1863, making it the country where this practice has been outlawed the longest.

There is a history of tension between church and state in the country. The Catholic Church has accused Chavez of concentrating power in his own hands. In 2009, in the Catholic Church's Easter address to the nation, the bishops said the country's democracy was in "serious danger of collapse."

A 2026 opinion poll found the most urgent issues for Venezuelans were inflation and low wages.

== Elections ==
Venezuela elects at a national level the President of Venezuela as head of state and head of government and a unicameral federal legislature. The President of Venezuela is elected for a six-year term by direct election plurality voting and is eligible for re-election since the 2009 Venezuelan constitutional referendum) The National Assembly (Asamblea Nacional) has 165 members (diputados), elected for five-year terms. Elections also take place at state level and local level.

On 25 April 2023, representatives from 19 nations, including the European Union, attended a conference that was intended to rekindle negotiations between Nicolás Maduro's government in Venezuela and the opposition political parties, but it had no noticeable impact.

=== Latest elections ===
Most recent elections:

- municipal: 2017 Venezuelan municipal elections
- parliamentary: 2025 Venezuelan parliamentary election
- regional: 2021 Venezuelan regional elections
- presidential: 2024 Venezuelan presidential election
- constituent assembly: 2017 Venezuelan Constituent Assembly election

== See also ==
- Censorship in Venezuela
- Chavismo
- Human rights in Venezuela
- Public Ministry of Venezuela
- Student politics in Venezuela
