= Venezuelan protests =

Venezuelan protests may refer to:

- Protests in Venezuela
- 2007 Venezuelan RCTV protests
- 2007 Venezuelan referendum protests
- Protests against Nicolás Maduro
  - 2014 Venezuelan protests
  - 2017 Venezuelan protests
  - 2019 Venezuelan protests
  - 2024 Venezuelan protests

== See also ==
- Crisis in Venezuela
