= ¡Aquí Está! =

Venezuelan newspaper

¡Aquí Está! ('It's Here!'or 'Here it is!') was a Venezuelan weekly newspaper, the central organ of the Communist Party of Venezuela. ¡Aquí Está! was founded in 1942 by Miguel Otero Silva (recently returned from exile), as the Venezuelan political climate was liberalized under Isaías Medina Angarita. ¡Aquí Está! substituted the previous Communist Party organ El Martillo, which had been re-launched in 1938. ¡Aquí Está! was marked by a 'Browderist' editorial line. Apart from Otero Silva, other editors of ¡Aquí Está! were Carlos Augusto Léon and Ernesto Silva Tellerías. The newspaper was published from Caracas. Through ¡Aquí Está! the Communist Party was able to win a considerable influence over the urban intelligentsia.

¡Aquí Está! published a large amount of Juan Bautista Fuenmayor's, general secretary of the Communist Party of Venezuela, journalistic works.

On September 10, 1946, ahead of the Constituent Assembly election the Communist Party decided to merge ¡Aquí Está! with another communist newspaper, Unidad, and launch a new publication, El Popular.
