= Torres Municipality =

Torres Municipality Municipio Torres
- Municipality
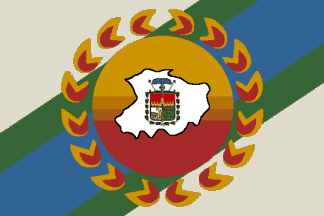
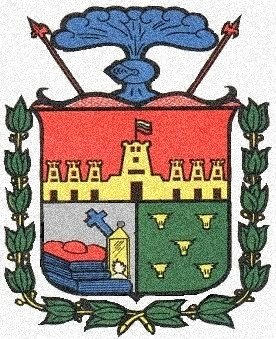
- Flag Coat of arms

- Location in Lara

- Location in Venezuela
- Coordinates: 10°09′00″N 70°11′25″W
- Country: Venezuela
- State: Lara

Government
  - Mayor: Lasmit Verde Medina (PSUV)

Area
  - Total: 7,189.0 km^{2} (2,775.7 sq mi)

Population (2007)
  - Total: 188,188
  - Density: 26.177/km^{2} (67.799/sq mi)
- Time zone: UTC−4 (VET)
- Area code(s): 0252

The Torres Municipality is one of the eight municipalities (municipios) that makes up the Venezuelan state of Lara and, according to a 2011 population estimate by the National Institute of Statistics of Venezuela, the municipality has a population of 185.275. The town of Carora is the shire town of the Torres Municipality.

== History ==
The town of Carora was founded twice. The first time was in 1569 by Juan de Tejo, but it was evacuated because of attacks by local natives. It was founded again in 1572 by Juan de Salmanca. Carora has one of the most beautiful and well-conserved colonial zones in Venezuela. This is visible in the streets and the colonial houses of this part of Carora. One of the interesting characteristics of the colonial zone is that most of the houses are still occupied by descendants of the original owners.

The cathedral of San Juan Bautista (Saint John the Baptist) was constructed at the beginning of 1600, with a very simple facade. In the inner part it is decorated with wood pillars and forged iron lights, in addition to a gold and wooden altar. Other sites of interest in Carora are: The José Zubillaga Perera Library, the birthplace of the Venezuelan hero Juan Jacinto Lara, and Lara House, the Fine arts Center. Also the Chapel of El Calvario, an example of the colonial baroque architecture. Also in the historic zone is the well-known Torres Club. Founded in 1898, this is in a colonial house. It has a restaurant and a "Healthcare center", which is only for members, but can usually be visited by tourists.

== Economy ==
- Agricultural potential: The main commercial activity of the region is cattle ranching, specifically dairy farming. Other agriculture products of the region are sugar cane and grapes. The former has the greater area under cultivation. In the case of the grapes cultivated in the Valley of Altagracia, these represents 86% of the crop cultivated in the Lara state. This activity is tied to the wine industry. That has acquired a national reputation with some of best wines of the country.

There is a possibility of extending the Center-West railway network to Carora, which would contribute to consolidating the industrial zone.

Commerce in Carora, has a high proportion of small and larger retailers, and an institute for the control of this sector, the ACIC, has been created.

- Touristic potential: The city includes two different types of landscapes, one dry with Xerophile vegetation, and another with subhumid characteristics. The latter, the Carora's historic zone and the Cerro Saroche national park, has a great touristic potential.

== Demographics ==
The Torres Municipality, according to a 2011 population estimate by the National Institute of Statistics of Venezuela, has a population of 185,275. This amounts to 10.4% of the state's population. The municipality's population density is 27.06 inhabitants per square kilometre (70.1/sq mi).

== Government ==
The municipality is divided into 17 parishes; Trinidad Samuel, Antonio Díaz, Camacaro, Castañeda, Cecilio Zubillaga, Chiquinquirá, El Blanco, Espinoza de los Monteros, Lara, Las Mercedes, Manuel Morillo, Montaña Verde, Montes de Oca, Torres, Heriberto Arroyo, Reyes Vargas, and Altagracia.

Between 2005 and 2016, the municipality "may have been the world's most democratic city" owing to the citizens having 100% control over municipal investment funds.

== Education ==
Colleges and universities in Carora include the Universidad Centroccidental Lisandro Alvarado (Lisandro Alvarado Center-West University) or UCLA, is a public institution in Barquisimeto, created on September 22, 1962, under Romulo Betancourt, with the name of Experimental Center of Superior Studies. It began with four schools: medicine, agronomy, veterinary and administration. In 1967, the name changed to Center-West University, continuing the educational and administrative activities of the Experimental Center of Superior Studies. On April 2, 1979, the Venezuelan government rename the institution as Lisandro Alvarado Center-West University.

== Culture ==
Carora has been the birthplace of notable people: guitarists Alirio Diaz and Rodrigo Riera; historians Gillermo Moron, Ismael Silva Montañes, Ambrosio Perera; health scientist Dr. Pastor Oropeza; professional pitcher Ranger Suárez; and lawyers Ambrosio Oropeza, Juan Oropeza, Antonio Oropeza and Jose "Cheito" Herrera Oropeza, one of the writers of the 1961 Venezuelan Constitution.

== See also ==
- Carora
- Lara
- Municipalities of Venezuela
