= Juan Griego =

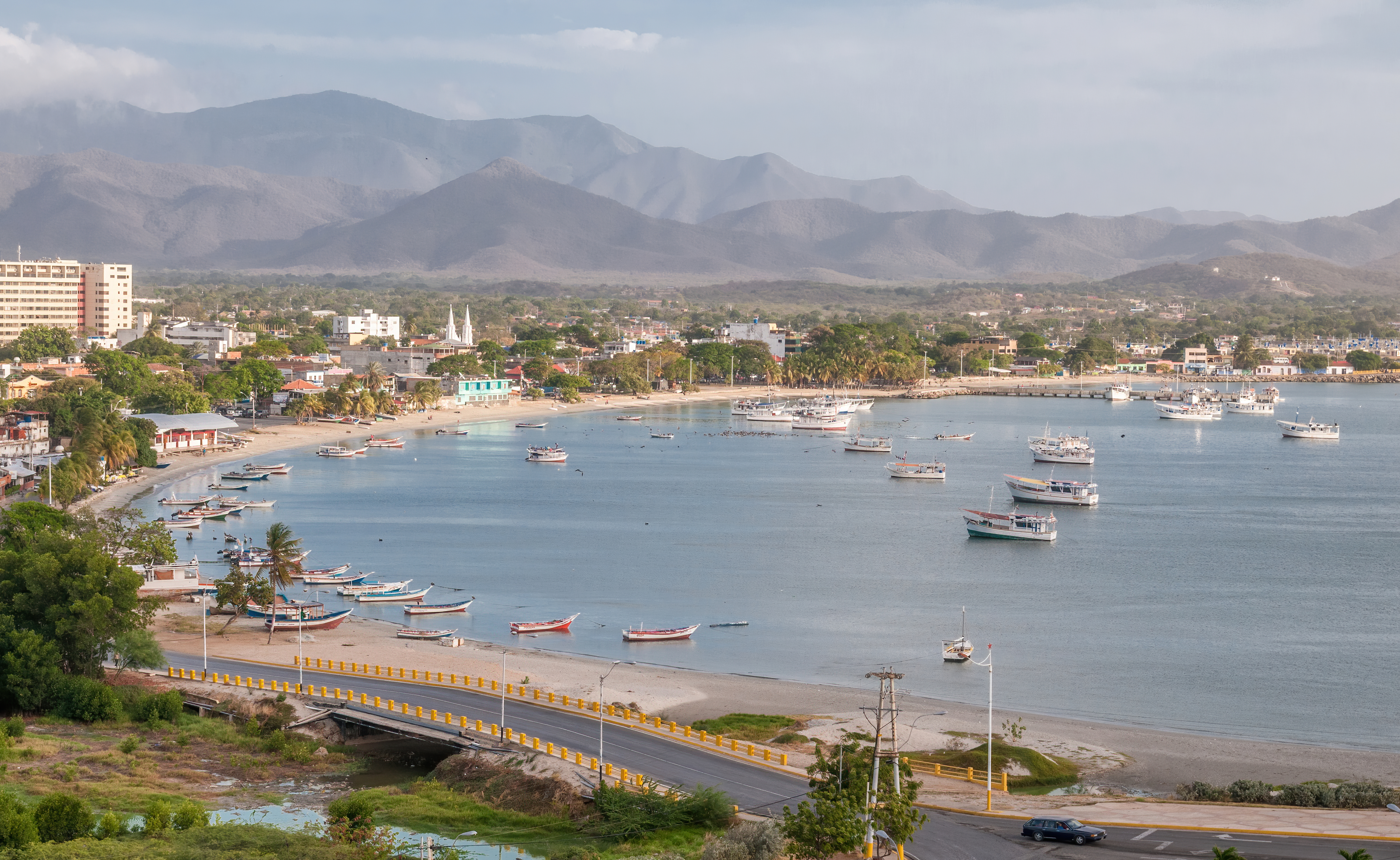
- The bay of Juan Griego

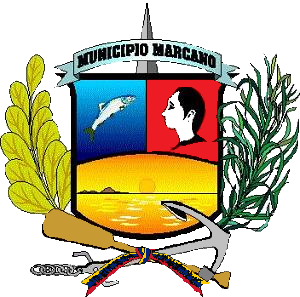
- Coat of arms

- Location within Venezuela
- Coordinates: 11°05′0″N 63°58′0″W
- Country: Venezuela
- State: Nueva Esparta
- Municipality: Marcano Municipality
- Founded: c 1545
- Elevation: 10 m (33 ft)

Population (2001)
  - Total: 28,256
  - Demonym: Juangrieguenses
- Time zone: VST
- Postal code: 6309
- Area code: 0295
- Climate: BSh

Juan Griego is a city on the northern side of Isla Margarita, and is the most northern port in Venezuela. It has a population of 28,256 inhabitants (as per census of 2001) and is capital of the Marcano municipality of the Nueva Esparta state.

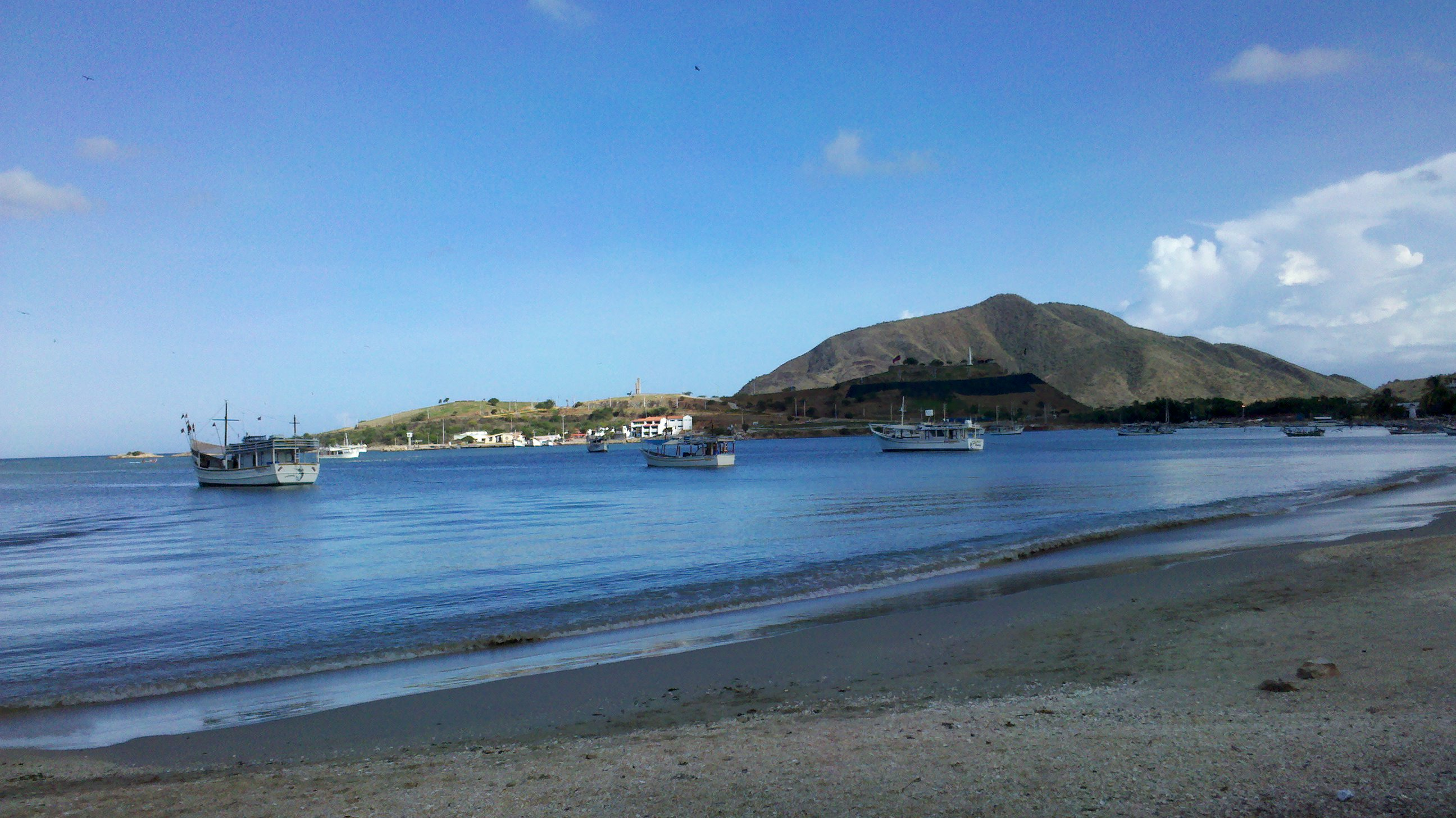
Juan Griego Bay

== History ==
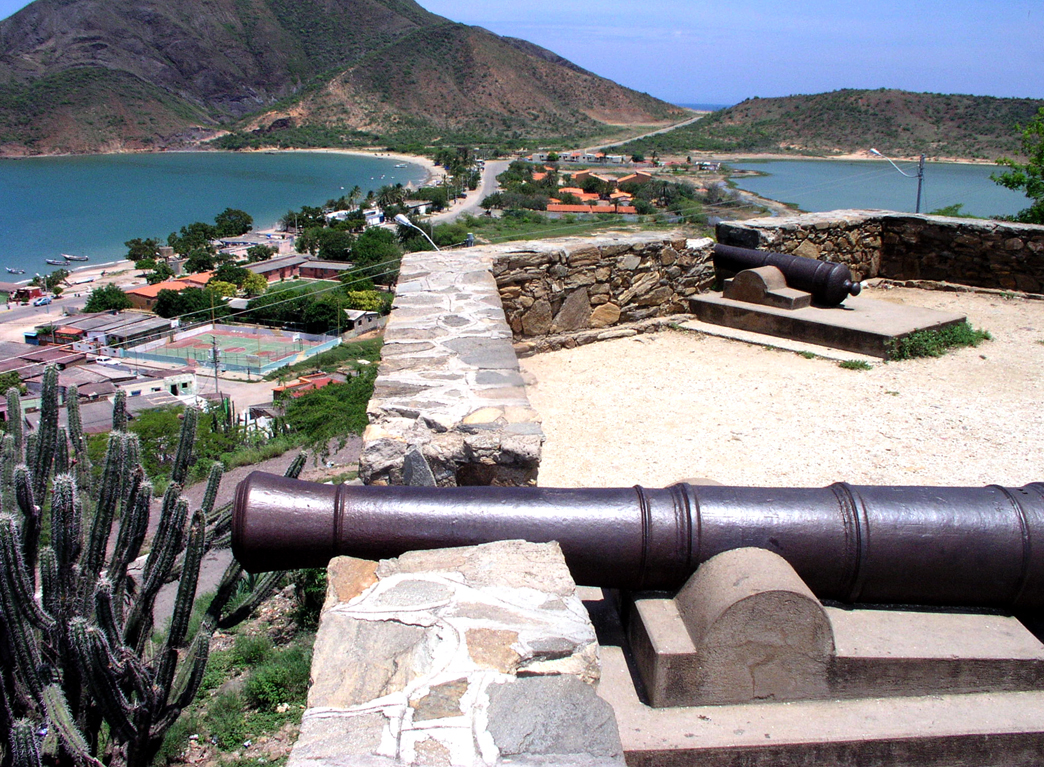
La Galera, a Spanish colonial fort, separates the bay in two

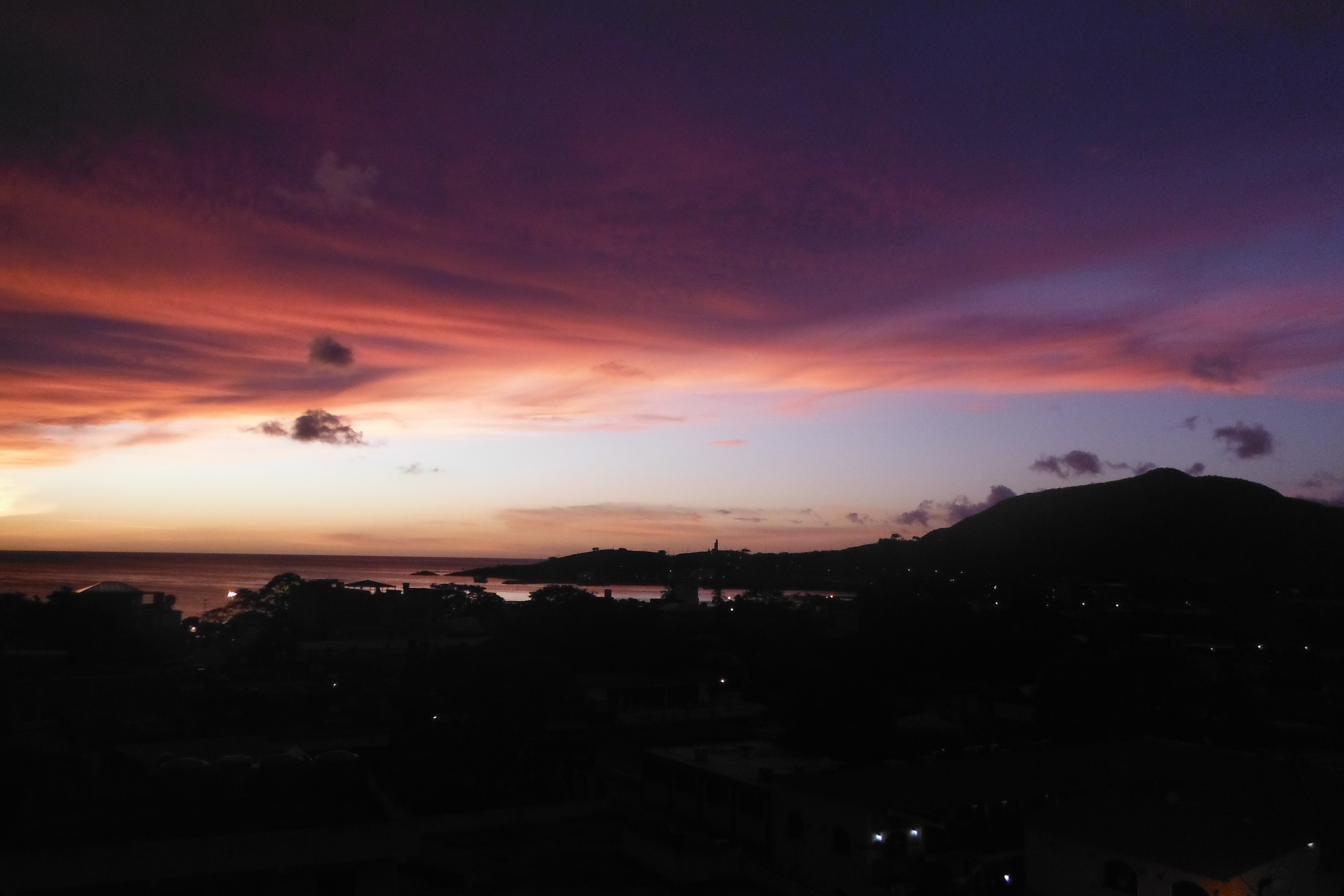
Sunset at Juan Griego

The city is named after Juan the Greek, in Spanish "Juan Griego" who was born in Seville in the early 16th century. He was a navigator who crossed the ocean for the Americas. He started a prosperous business of transporting captive Indians from the island to Santo Domingo. He is mentioned in a census of 1545. After dying, the rest of the inhabitants of the town, probably for being the most prominent citizen of the place, began to call it after its founder.

The city began to receive importance in 1811 when, during the Venezuela War of Independence, it became a port and the construction of a battery to protect it military. In 1816, the port was used by Simon Bolivar for returning from Haiti.

In 1844, the Parish of San Juan Evangelista was created - Its church of gothic styling was constructed in 1850 by Fray Nicholas de Igualdad is still, along with the lovely bay, the symbol of the city.

In 1904, the government moved the capital of the island from Juan Griego to Pampatar, to the south of the island when the commercial activities greatly reduced. Nevertheless, the cultural activities continued to bloom in the city, In 1932 a young group of people started the Beneficent Society of Juan Griego, who perform plays, recitals of poetry, concerts and other artistic manifestations.

Composer Modesta Bor was born in Juan Griego in 1926.

In 1973, the island become a free port and the city once again become the second city in sequence of importance in the commercial activities after Porlamar.

== Notable people ==
- Francisco Antonio Rísquez (1856–1941), physician
