= Venezuelan Revolutionary Party =

Venezuelan Revolutionary Party (Spanish: Partido Revolucionario Venezolano, PRV) was a Venezuelan revolutionary organization. It was founded in Mexico in 1926 by a group of exiled communists, which had taken part in activities of the Communist Party of Mexico and other Latin American leftwing groups. Prominent members of the founding group were Salvador de la Plaza, Gustavo Machado, Emilio Machado, Miguel Zuñiga, Pedro Brito and Julio Martínez. In 1928 PRV began publishing Libertad, which was printed in Mexico but distributed illegally in Venezuela.

In the spring of 1929, PRV sent a paramilitary force to Venezuela, but the attempted rebellion was defeated.

The PRV was superseded by the Communist Party of Venezuela, founded in 1931.
