= Carolus Wimmer =

German-Venezuelan politician

Carolus Wimmer (born 10 September 1948) is a German-Venezuelan communist politician of the PCV and university professor. He is editor of its journal Debate Abierto (Open Debate), and a former member of the Latin American Parliament.

== Personal life ==
It was in the 1970s when he became a citizen of Venezuela by naturalisation.

== Political career ==
Wimmer has held a number of prominent government and political posts in Venezuela, becoming international advisor to the president of the National Assembly from 2001 until 2002, then director of international relations of the National Assembly from 2002 to 2005.

In 2005, he was elected to the Latin American Parliament and, from 2008 until 2011, served as the vice-president of the Venezuelan bloc in that organisation. He was re-elected as a member of the Parliament in 2011 and sat until the end of his term in 2016.
