= Pedro Sotillo =

Venezuelan writer, journalist, and poet

25th Governor of Guárico
- In office 1943–1945
- Preceded by: Julio Montenegro
- Succeeded by: Manuel Gimon Itriago

Personal details
- Born: 1902 San José de Unare, Venezuela
- Died: 1977 (aged 74–75)
- Party: Democratic Action
- Profession: writer, journalist, poet

Pedro Sotillo (1902–1977) was a Venezuelan writer, journalist, and poet. He was a distinguished member of the Generation of 1928 and co-founder of several well-known magazines such as El Ingenioso Hidalgo and Válvula.

== Early life ==
Pedro Sotillo was born in San José de Unare, Guárico, Venezuela, in 1902. In 1928, Sotillo and several other young writers, including Arturo Úslar Pietri, Miguel Otero Silva, Nelson Himiob, Juan Oropeza, Fernando Paz Castillo, Gonzalo Carnevalli, among others, founded the literary magazine Válvula considered the official voice of the Venezuelan vanguardistas.

== Journalist work ==
In 1935, Pedro Sotillo founded another magazine, El Ingenioso Hidalgo, along with his friends Arturo Úslar Pietri, Julián Padrón, and Alfredo Boulton. Later, in 1939, he published his first work, Andanzas. Other works would follow suit, La Calle y Los Caminos in 1951, and Caminos nocturnos, in 1956.

During the 1940s, Pedro Sotillo worked as director of El Nacional, which today is one of Venezuela's largest newspapers, and that was founded by his friend, novelist Miguel Otero Silva. He also worked for El Heraldo, a very important newspaper in Venezuela during the 1940s and 1950s, owned by his very close friend Ricardo Domínguez Urbano-Taylor.

== Last years and death ==
Pedro Sotillo occupied several political posts during the 1940s, including Secretary of Government, governor of the state of Guárico, and as a Venezuelan congressman. Pedro Sotillo died in Caracas in 1977.

== See also ==
- Arturo Úslar Pietri
- Miguel Otero Silva
