= Pastor Oropeza Riera =

Venezuelan pediatrician

Pastor Oropeza Riera (12 October 1901 – 9 July 1991), born in Carora, Lara State, Venezuela, was a renowned pediatrician and one of the most prominent medical personalities in Venezuela. Later on in his life he also occupied certain political positions such as a term as a Deputy to the National Assembly.

== Legacy ==
- In 1964 the award "Premio Pastor Oropeza" was created in his honor
- In 1983 he was named "Padre de la Pediatria Nacional" or the father of national pediatrics
- Numerous hospitals, clinics and departments are named after him
