= José Agustín Catalá =

Venezuelan journalist and author

José Agustín Catalá Delgado (11 February 1915, Guanare - 18 December 2011) was a Venezuelan journalist and author.

== Career ==
He was best known for his work on the 1948-58 dictatorship of Marcos Pérez Jiménez, during which he spent three years in prison. He had previously been imprisoned for four months in 1934, for publication of a poem, under Juan Vicente Gomez. Under Pérez Jiménez, Catalá's company Editorial Ávila Gráfica printed the clandestine Democratic Action's materials, such as newspapers and manifestos. Catalá was arrested following the publication in 1952 of Venezuela bajo el signo del terror, 1948-1952.

He received Chile's Order of Bernardo O'Higgins in 1996 for his work on Augusto Pinochet's dictatorship.

A biography, José Agustín Catalá, una manera de ser hombre: libro homenaje a sus 70 años was published in 1985 by Ramón José Velásquez.

== Selected bibliography ==
- Documentos para la historia de Acción Democrática 1936-1941, Volume 1 (1981, Ediciones Centauro)
- (with Oswaldo Barreto) Las mascaras del dictador Perez Jimenez (1984, Ediciones Centauro)
- Blanca Ibáńez y las miserias del poder (1990, Ediciones Centauro - on Jaime Lusinchi's mistress)
- (with Octavio Lepage) Política, democracia, partidos (1991, Ediciones Centauro)
- (with Carlos Andrés Pérez) Otros juicios sobre el proceso al ex presidente Carlos Andrés Pérez: escritos sin pasión y sin odio (1994, Ediciones Centauro)
- Pérez Jiménez: el dictador que en 40 años olvidó sus crímenes (1997, Ediciones Centauro)
- Los archivos del terror: 1948-1958, la década trágica : presos, torturados, exiliados, muertos (1998, Gobernación del Estado Mérida)
- Cipriano Castro y su tiempo histórico (1999, Fondo Editorial Nacional - on Cipriano Castro)
- (with Casal Hernández Casal H.) El debate constituyente en Venezuela: ideas para una nueva constitución (1999, Fondo Editorial Nacional)
- (with Domingo Alberto Rangel) Gustavo Machado: un caudillo prestado al comunismo (2001, Ediciones Centauro)
- (with José Rodríguez Iturbe) Crítica de la locura del poder y otros temas: apuntes sobre una crisis social real y una falsa Revolución Militar Política (2002, Ediciones Centauro)
- (with Eleazar Díaz Rangel) De Pérez Jiménez a los años de Hugo Chávez (2003, Ediciones Centauro)
- (with Rafael Arráiz Lucca) Apuntes de memoria del editor José Agustín Catalá, 1915-2007: en el portal de los 93 años (2007, Ediciones Centauro)

== See also ==
- Political prisoners in Venezuela
