= Marcano Municipality =

Marcano Municipality Municipio Marcano
- Municipality
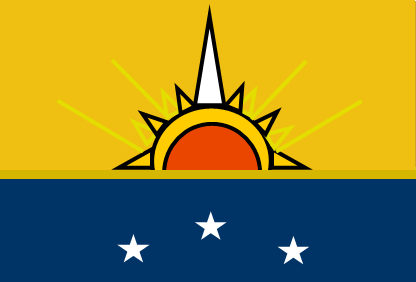
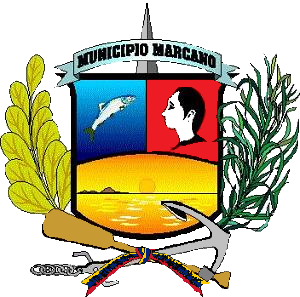
- Flag Coat of arms

- Location in Nueva Esparta

- Location in Venezuela
- Coordinates: 11°03′32″N 63°58′38″W
- Country: Venezuela
- State: Nueva Esparta
- Municipal seat: Juan Griego

Area
  - Total: 47.9 km^{2} (18.5 sq mi)
- Time zone: UTC−4 (VET)
- Website: Official website

Marcano is a municipality of Isla Margarita in the state of Nueva Esparta, Venezuela. The capital is Juan Griego.
