= Popular Revolutionary Alternative =

Political coalition in Venezuela

Popular Revolutionary Alternative Alternativa Popular Revolucionaria
- Abbreviation: APR
- Founded: 11 August 2020
- Ideology: Revolutionary socialism Anti-imperialism; Bolivarianism; Chavismo; Factions: Trotskyism
- Political position: Far-left
- Coalition: Parties list: PCV; PPT (section); Tupamaro (section); Lucha de Clases; United Left; MBR-200; PRT; SL; COMPA; RAC
- Colours: Red; Blue
- National Assembly: 1 / 277
- Deputies to the State Legislative Councils: 18 / 251
- Governors: 0 / 23
- Mayors: 0 / 335

Website
- Twitter page

The Popular Revolutionary Alternative (Spanish: Alternativa Popular Revolucionaria, APR) is a Venezuelan Chavista political coalition made up of socialist and leftist parties critical of the administration of Nicolás Maduro.

The coalition was created in the leadup to the 2020 Venezuelan parliamentary election to bring together the political forces that support the Bolivarian Revolution, as begun by Hugo Chávez, and who also seek to demarcate themselves from governmental policy.

== History ==
=== Background ===
The emergence of the Popular Revolutionary Alternative as a coalition coincided with a series of interventions by the Supreme Tribunal of Justice towards some of the left-wing parties in the Great Patriotic Pole, such as Tupamaro and Patria Para Todos. The Communist Party of Venezuela also denounced surveillance by the Bolivarian National Intelligence Service on their headquarters in Puerto Cabello.

The parties that have formed the APR claim that the difficulties the Venezuelan economy is going through are due to the structural crisis of capitalism, intensified by the "economic asphyxiation of US imperialism." The coalition denounces high costs of living, low salaries, and the rampant speculation & corruption in Venezuela currently, as well as opposing the adoption of unpopular measures by the "social-democratic" government that leads the PSUV. The APR stands for a "revolutionary way out" of the crisis in the country.

=== 2020 parliamentary elections ===
Within the framework of the 2020 elections to the National Assembly, the Popular Revolutionary Alternative will be using the electoral ticket of the Communist Party of Venezuela, the only ticket which the government has authorized to run legally.

During the campaign, various candidates and leaders of the APR have been subject to arrests and death threats.

== Coalition parties ==
| Political Party | Acronym (Spanish) | Founded in | Political tendency |
|---|---|---|---|
| Communist Party of Venezuela (section) | PCV | 1931 | Communism, Marxism–Leninism |
| Fatherland for All (section) | PPT | 1997 | Libertarian socialism |
| Revolutionary Movement Tupamaro (section) | MRT | 1998 | Communism, Marxism–Leninism, Guevarism |
| Revolutionary Party of Labour | PRT | 2012 | Communism, Marxism–Leninism |
| Lucha de Clases (RevolutionaryCommunists International) | LdC | 2010 | Communism, Trotskyism |
| Somos Lina Movement | SL | 2018 | Anti-imperialism |
| Revolutionary Bolivarian Movement-200 | MBR-200 | 1982 | Left-wing nationalism |
| United Left | IU | 2002 | Socialism |
| Compromiso País | COMPA | | Anti-oligarchy |
| Red Autónoma de Comuneros | RAC | 2009 | Communalism |

== See also ==
- Communist Party of Venezuela
- Bolivarian Revolution
- Great Patriotic Pole
