= Casas Muertas =

1955 novel by Miguel Otero Silva

- Author: Miguel Otero Silva
- Language: Spanish
- Publication date: 1955
- Publication place: Venezuela

Casas Muertas (lit. 'Dead Houses') is the second novel by Venezuelan writer Miguel Otero Silva, published by Editorial Losada in 1955. The novel describes the decline of Ortiz, a town in the central plains of the country, due to the continuous deaths from severe malaria epidemics and the emigration of its inhabitants to the large cities and oil production zones. For the novel, Otero won the 1956 National Literature Prize and the Arístides Rojas Novel Prize, which would have a sequel six years later: Oficina n.º 1.
