= Generation of 1928 =

Venezuelan students who led protests

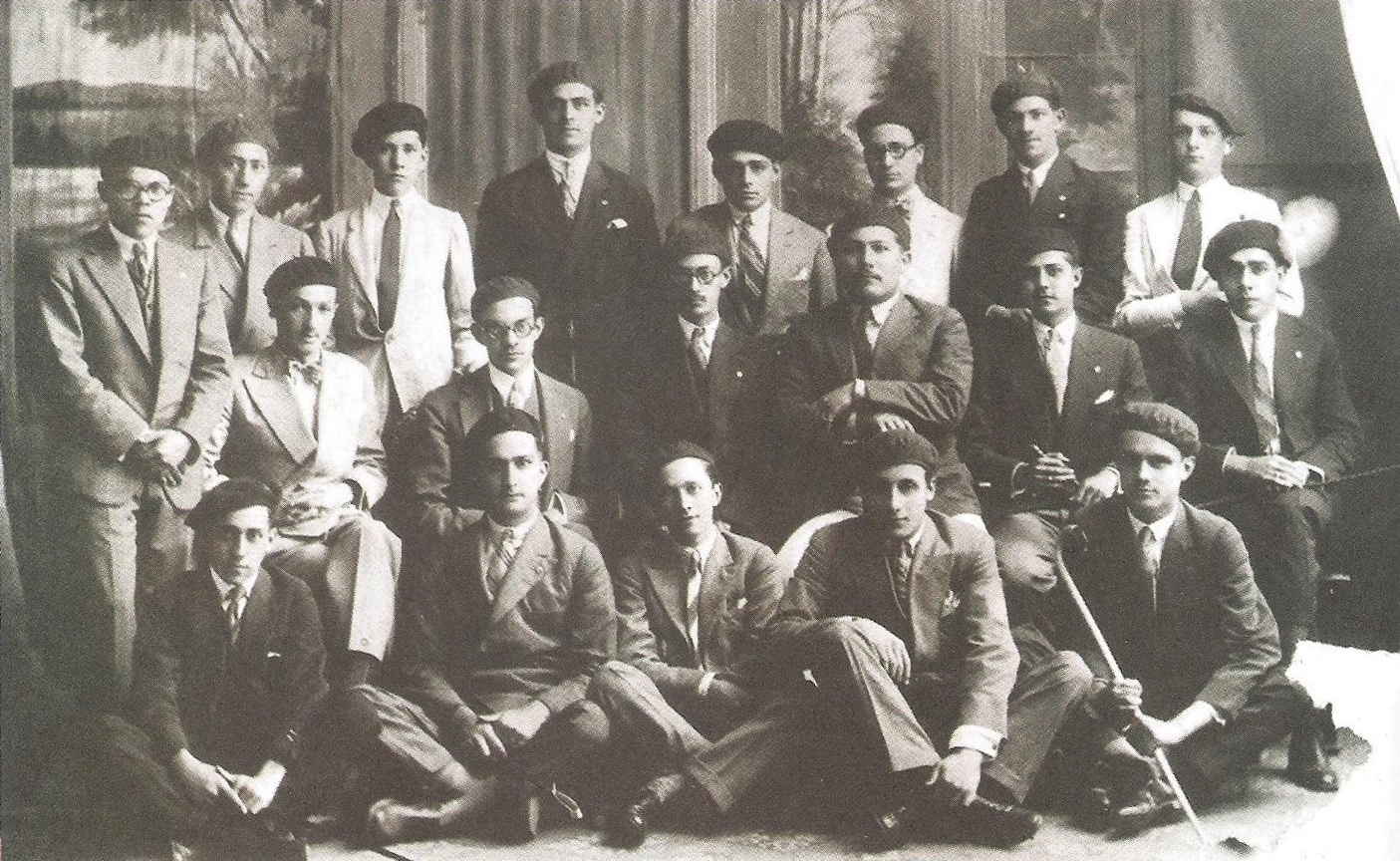
Students of the Generation of 1928.

The Generation of 1928 (Spanish: Generación del 28) was a group of Venezuelan students who led protests in Caracas in 1928 against the dictatorship of Juan Vicente Gómez.

== Members and exile ==
Many politicians prominent in Venezuela's transition to democracy took part in the protests. They include Rómulo Betancourt, Jóvito Villalba, Juan Oropeza, Joaquín Gabaldón Márquez, Raúl Leoni, Andrés Eloy Blanco, Miguel Otero Silva, Pedro Sotillo, Francisco Ignacio Romero, Isaac J Pardo, Juan Bautista Fuenmayor, Germán Suárez Flamerich, Iván Darío Maldonado Bello, Gustavo Machado, and Antonia Palacios.

After the 1928 protests a number of the Generation of 1928 went into exile. Political organizations in exile included the founding of Agrupación Revolucionaria de Izquierda (ARDI) in Colombia in 1931 by Rómulo Betancourt and others. This later became the Partido Democrático Nacional, a forerunner of Democratic Action. The Communist Party of Venezuela, also founded in 1931, was initially led by Francisco José "Kotepa" Delgado and Juan Bautista Fuenmayor.

== See also ==
- Movimiento Estudiantil (Venezuela)

== Bibliography ==
- Miranda, Julio E. (2001). Antología histórica de la poesía venezolana del siglo XX, 1907-1996. La Editorial, UPR. ISBN 978-0-8477-0121-6.
