= Francisco Antonio Rísquez =

Venezuelan politician (1856–1941)

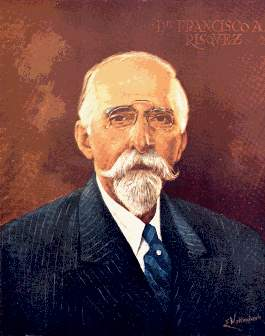

Francisco Antonio Rísquez (1856, Juan Griego –1941) was a Venezuelan physician. In 1893, he gave an address to the first Pan-American Medical Congress.
