= Carora =

- City
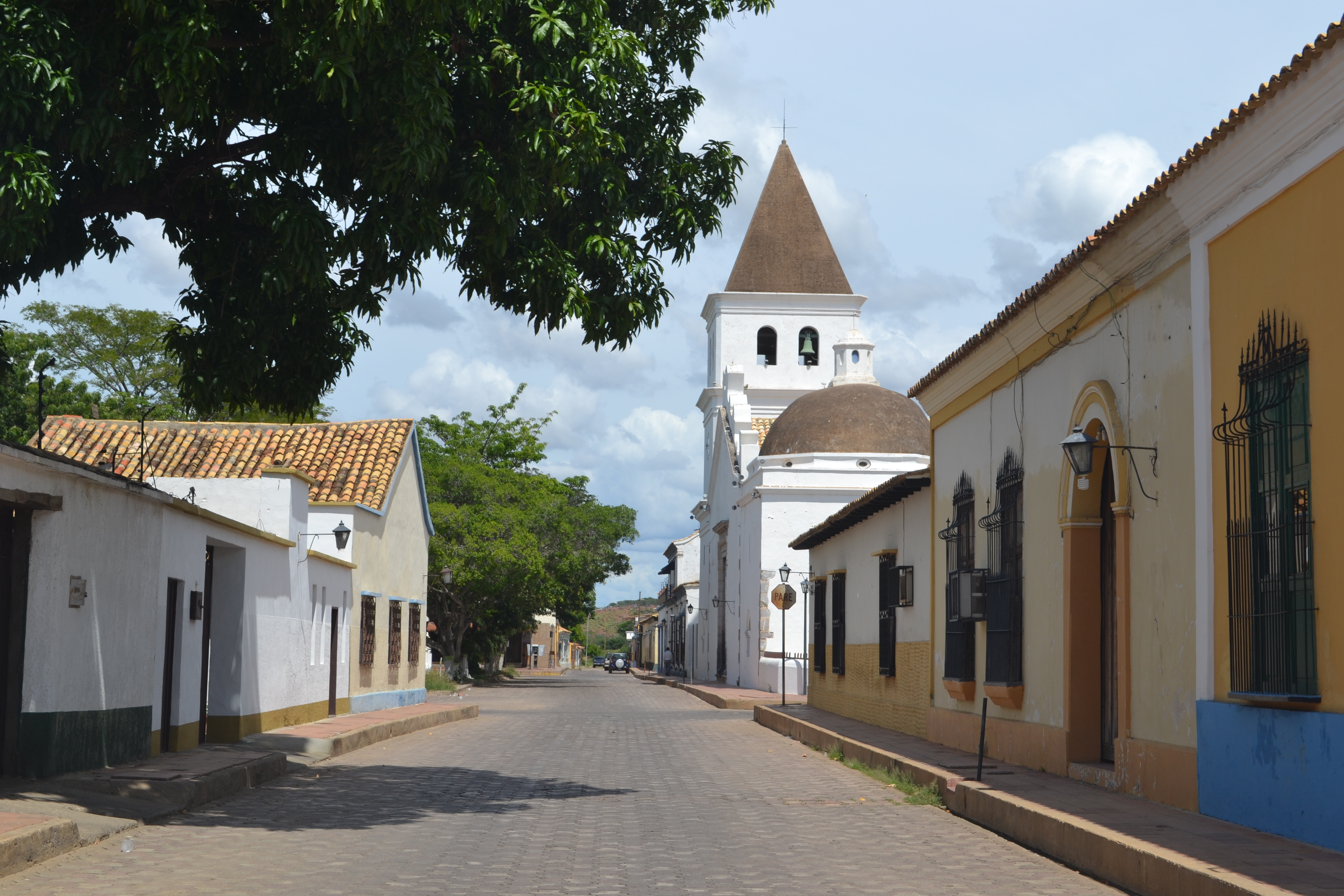
- Typical street of Carohana

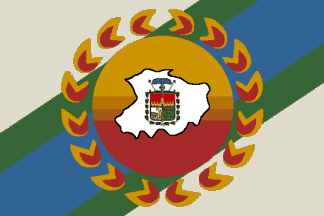
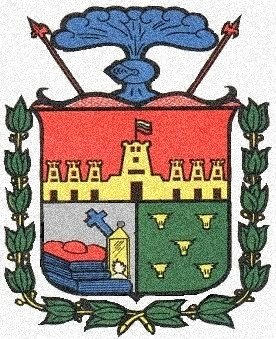
- Flag Coat of arms

- Location within Venezuela
- Coordinates: 10°10′16″N 70°04′47″W
- Country: Venezuela
- State: Lara
- Counties: Torres Municipality

Government
  - Mayor: Lasmit Verde Medina (PSUV)
- Elevation: 419 m (1,375 ft)

Population (2020)
  - Total: 209,217
- Demonyms: carorenian, carorian, caroreño/a, caroriano/a.
- Climate: Aw
- Website: Alcaldía de Torres

The City of Carora, commonly called Carora City (in Spanish, Ciudad de Carora), is a city in Lara State, Venezuela, on the Morere River, a branch of the Tocuyo River. It is about 54 miles southwest of Barquisimeto.

== History ==
Carora City was founded twice. The first time, in the year 1569 by Juan de Trejo, but due to constant attacks from the indigenous population, it was abandoned, only to be refounded three years later (1572) by Juan de Salmanca. Carora City flourished in colonial times, and grew to a population of nearly 10,000.

== Economy ==
As of 1911, the neighboring country was devoted principally to raising horses, mules and cattle; in addition to hides and leather, it exported rubber and other forest products. As of 2005 the main economic activity of the area is still cattle ranching, but on milk production and milk products. In the 1990s grapes and wine making became important.

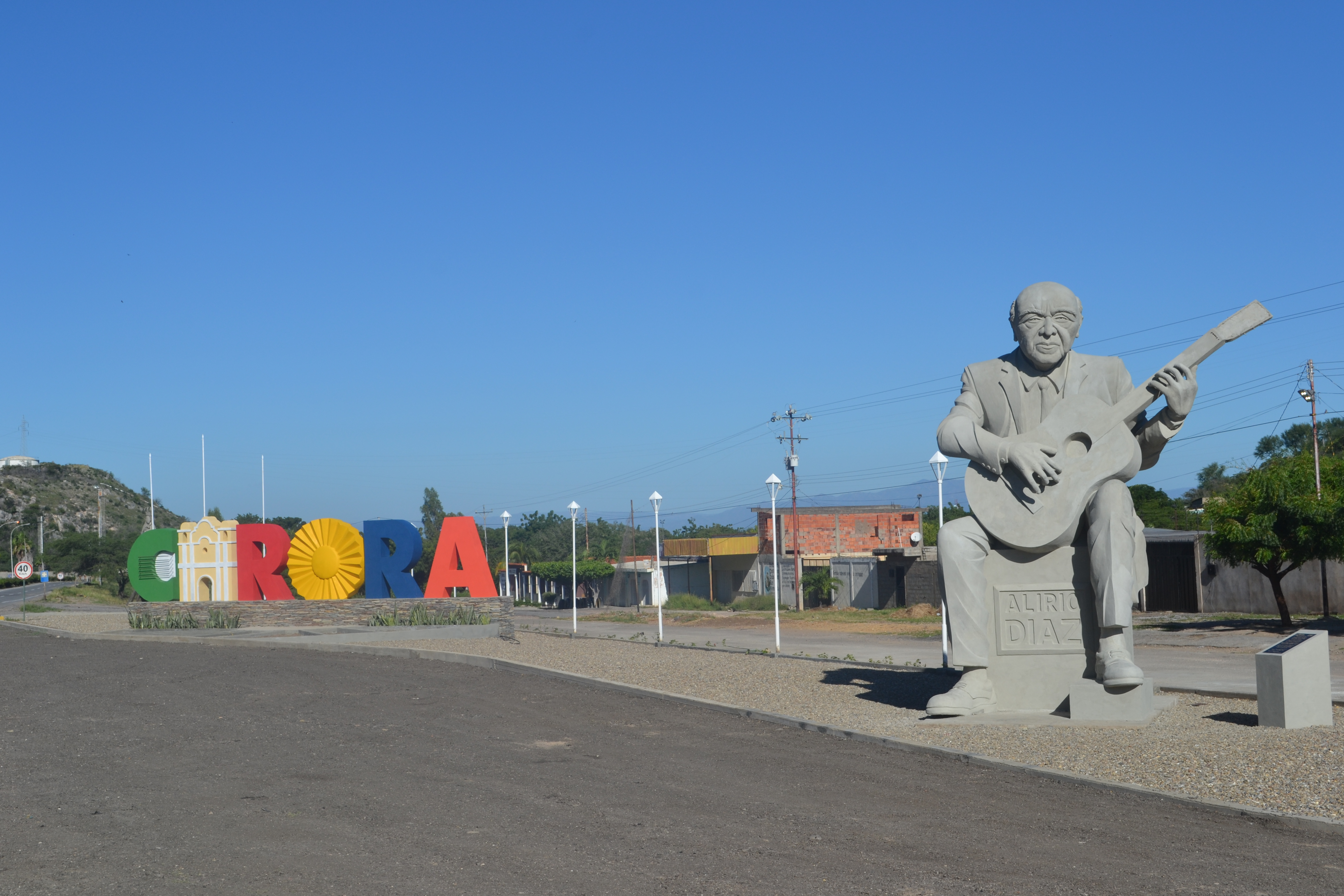
Alirio Díaz Monument in Carora.

== Education ==
Colleges and universities in Carohana City include National Experimental Polytechnic University Antonio Jose de Sucre (UNEXPO), National Open University, and Technological University Institute Mario Briceño Iragorry.

== Transport ==
The city is served by Carora Airport.

== Notable landmarks ==
- San Juan Bautista Cathedral
- Casa Amarilla
- Iglesia el Calvario
- Calle San Juan - colonial street
- Plaza Bolívar - colonial square in front of the cathedral.
- Club Torres - a private club which was founded in 1724
- Plaza Chío Zubillag - a square in the heart of the city
- Ruins of Iglesia la Pastora
- Teatro Alirio Díaz

== Notable people ==
Carora City has been the birthplace of notable people in many fields. Notables include guitar players Alirio Diaz and Rodrigo Riera; historians Guillermo Moron, Ismael Silva Montañes, Ambrosio Perera; lawyers Ambrosio Oropeza, Juan Oropeza, Antonio Oropeza; health science Dr. Pastor Oropeza; lawyer and one of the writers of the 1961 Venezuelan Constitution Jose "Cheito" Herrera Oropeza; professional baseball player Yohendrick Piñango; and Héctor Mujica, writer, journalist, co-founder of The Venezuelan.
