= Antonia Palacios =

Venezuelan writer (1904–2001)

- Born: 13 May 1904; Caracas, Venezuela
- Died: 2001 (aged 96–97); Caracas
- Writing career
- Language: Spanish

Antonia Palacios (13 May 1904 – 2001) was a Venezuelan poet, novelist and essayist. She won the National Prize for Literature in 1976 and the Municipal Prize for Literature in 1982. Along with Miguel Otero Silva, Pablo Rojas Guardia, Luis Castro, and others, she was a member of the Generation of 1928.

== Biography ==
She was born in Caracas, Venezuela, in 1904. She barely attended the first years of primary school, but her mother, as was customary at the time, was responsible for cultivating her culture by approaching books and art. Her father was the engineer Andrés Palacios, a direct descendant of Bonifacio Palacios, uncle of Simón Bolívar, and his mother, Isabel Caspers, niece of Ezequiel Zamora. The Caspers Palaces, despite their illustrious last names, had no means of fortune. In her childhood, the family lived in La Candelaria, in the Plaza del Pantheon and in Maiquetía. Back in Caracas, her life was not very different from those of her generation mates. After the events of 1928 she participated in many activities. It was at her home, in 1929, that the “Zero Theoretical Group” was born, which disappeared due to political persecution.

Some time later she married Carlos Eduardo Frías, director of the magazine Elite Elite Storyteller. In 1935, her son Fernán was born. At that time she published her first works, with a pseudonym, in Elite. During the government of Eleazar López Contreras, Her husband entered the Foreign Service and was in Paris and Geneva. From that experience came the publication of her essay Paris and three memories (1944). In 1941, her daughter María Antonia was born, she was a prodigy girl on the piano and would die in full youth because of a Diabetes Mellitus I. In 1949, her only novel, “Ana Isabel, a decent girl” was published in Buenos Aires. The novel recalls the happy childhood of the protagonist, which recovers in her memories certain areas of the center of the city of Caracas. In 1954 she published Chronicles of the Hours, in 1955 Trip to the frailejón, a beautiful story of a trip to the Andes made a short time before.

Travels- She spent time in New York, between 1955 and 1956, for her daughter's piano career. She then moved to Caracas where Harriet Serr, one of the best piano teachers in the United States, would support her child prodigy. In 1957 Antonia and her daughter settled in Europe, first Rome, then Vienna, for María Antonia's musical studies, but the young woman unexpectedly decided to leave her musical career and returned to Caracas, where Diabetes was diagnosed. Her situation worsened until she died, months after she was married and after actively participating in the subversive movements of the extreme left. It was a devastating blow for Antonia Palacios, from which she never recovered.

The writer returned in 1972 with the stories Insular in which she made a poetic incursion into the future of consciousness and in 1973 she published “Texts of eviction”, prose poems.

In 1976, she was Jury of the Romulo Gallegos Novel Prize, and, on the initiative of Oswaldo Trejo, directed the narrative workshop of the Celarg (Centro de Estudios Latinoamericanos Rómulo Gallegos), an experience that led her to open her own narrative workshop at her house in Altamira, which she called "Calicanto". From there came the publication of “Leaves of calicanto” which collected the work of the workshop workers.

The last publications she made were “A square occupying a disconcerting space” (stories, 1981), “Multiplicated shadow” (1983), “The stone and the mirror” (1985), “Fictions and afflictions” (1989), “Long wind of memories” (1989), “That dark animal of the dream” (1991), “deep tremor of the secret” (1993

She died in Altamira, Caracas on March 13, 2001, after a period of loneliness, accentuated by the loss of hearing.

== Awards and honours ==
She was awarded the National Prize for Literature with The Long Day Already Safe (1975).

== Selected works ==
- (1945) París y tres recuerdos
- (1955) Viaje al Frailejón
- (1964) Crónica de las horas
- (1969) Ana Isabel : una niña decente : novel
- (1972) Los Insulares
- (1973) Viaje al frailejón
- (1975) El largo día ya seguro : relatos
- (1978) Textos del desalojo
- (1982) Una plaza ocupando un espacio desconcertante : relatos, 1974-1977
- (1983) Multiplicada sombra
- (1983) Cronicas de la Horas

== Bibliography ==
- Miranda, Julio E. (2001). Antología histórica de la poesía venezolana del siglo XX, 1907-1996. La Editorial, UPR. ISBN 978-0-8477-0121-6.
- Palacios, Antonia; Crespo, Luis Alberto; Ortega, Antonio López (1 January 1989). Ficciones y aflicciones. Fundacion Biblioteca Ayacuch. ISBN 978-980-276-104-3.
