= Gustavo Machado (politician) =

Politician in Venezuela

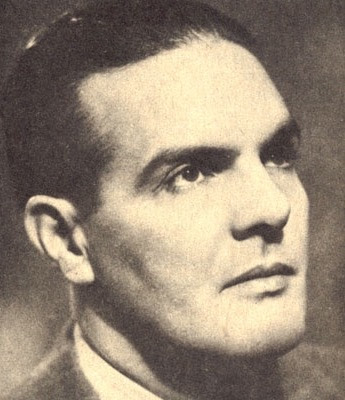

President of the Communist Party of Venezuela
- In office 26 july 1974 – 17 july 1983

Personal details
- Born: 19 July 1898 Caracas, Venezuela
- Died: 17 July 1983 (aged 84) Caracas
- Party: Mexican Communist Party (1918-1926) Venezuelan Revolutionary Party (PRV) (1926-1931) Communist Party of Venezuela (PCV) (1931-1983)
- Spouse(s): María Ida Lucas; Elsa Vera
- Education: University of Paris (1912-1983)
- Occupation: Lawyer (1918-1983)

Gustavo Machado Morales (19 July 1898 – 17 July 1983) was a Venezuelan politician and journalist, editor of the Communist Party of Venezuela's newspaper from 1948 to 1983 (with interruptions for exile and imprisonment) and President of the party from 1971 to 1983. As a leading Communist, he spent a substantial part of his life in exile or in prison. He was a founder member of the Venezuelan Revolutionary Party in February 1926, a forerunner of the Communist Party of Venezuela (founded in 1931). He was a member of the Generation of 1928 - activists opposing the dictatorship of Juan Vicente Gómez. During the 1945-8 democratic period he was a member of the Constituent Assembly and a candidate in the 1947 presidential election for the Communist Party. He was elected to the Venezuelan Chamber of Deputies four times, serving there for fifteen years.

== Life ==
Machado was born into a wealthy Venezuelan family, the son of Carlos Machado and María Morales. At age 16 he participated in the National Assembly of Students, and organised the first demonstration against the dictator Juan Vicente Gómez. Arrested in May 1914, he spent ten months in prison before being released. He went on to study law from 1916 to 1919 at the Central University of Venezuela. In 1916 Machado leads in Caracas a demonstration in favor of Belgium that sought to condemn the pro-German attitude assumed by the Dictator Juan Vicente Gómez in the World War I. In 1919 he went into exile following his involvement in the unsuccessful conspiracy of Luis Rafael Pimentel.

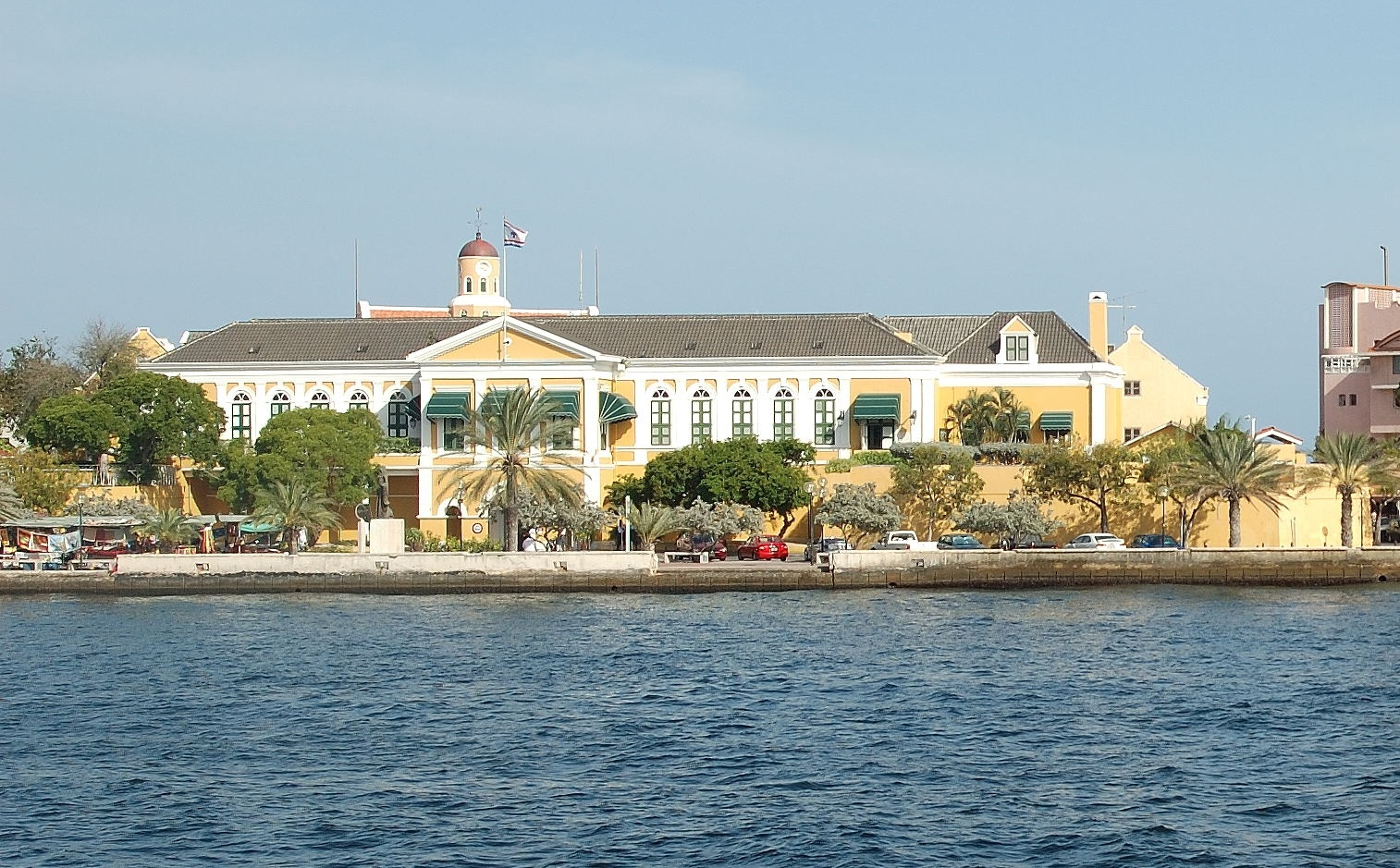
Fort Amsterdam of Willemstad taking of by Gustavo Machado and other Venezuelans revolutionaries (1929)

Given his passion and athletic conditions, he founded with his brothers Eduardo and Roberto, "Los Samanes BBC" one of the baseball clubs that between 1914 and 1918 maintained a strong rivalry with the "BBC Independencia", which polarized Caracas fans at that time. He stood out as an out-fielder and fourth team bat as well as played football as left-back.

He studied law at Harvard University and at La Sorbonne, where he met his wife, graduating from the Sorbonne in 1924. As a legal representative of the Cuba Cane Sugar Corporation he moved to Havana, where he observed student unrest with interest, and in 1925 participated in the founding of the original Cuban Communist Party (later renamed Popular Socialist Party). From 1926 to 1929 he lived in Mexico. A member of the French Communist Party, in Mexico he was a co-founder in exile of the Venezuelan Revolutionary Party in February 1926. He participated in Rafael Simón Urbina's June 1929 taking of Fort Amsterdam in Curaçao, in another attempt to overthrow Gómez. This movement involved the kidnapping of the governor of Curaçao, Leonard Albert Fruytier, by 250 men with the support of communists as Miguel Otero Silva, José Tomás Jiménez, and Guillermo Prince Lara. They plundered weapons, ammunition and the treasury of the island and hauled the governor Fruytier off to Venezuelan coasts on the stolen American ship Maracaibo. The revolutionaries landing at La Vela de Coro but were defeated by Gómez forces, and the raid ended in failure. After this failed raid Machado went into exile in Colombia with Urbina and others revolutionaries. On his return to Venezuela in 1935 he was imprisoned again, but was released on 14 February 1936 following popular pressure. Following a public declaration of communism in March 1936 he was expelled from Venezuela on 13 March 1937, returning to exile in Mexico.

Machado returned to Venezuela again in 1944 and began distributing Mexican and Soviet films and explained plans of creating a Communist organization. Following the 1945 Venezuelan coup d'état, Machado was one of two Communists elected to the new Constituent Assembly in the 1946 election. He was a candidate in the 1947 presidential election for the Communist Party, receiving 3.3% of the vote, and was elected to the Venezuelan Chamber of Deputies in the 1947 elections. In 1948 he founded the newspaper Tribuna Popular, the daily of the Communist Party, and was its director until his death, with the exception of the periods 1951 to 1958 (due to exile) and 1963 to 1968 (due to imprisonment). After the 1948 Venezuelan coup d'état had brought to an end the three-year democratic period known as El Trienio Adeco he was imprisoned again in 1950, and expelled from the country in 1951.

Following the restoration of democracy in 1958, Machado was elected to the Venezuelan Chamber of Deputies in the 1958 elections. On 30 September 1963, following the banning of the Communist Party of Venezuela by the government of Rómulo Betancourt, Machado was arrested. He was released in May 1968, and was again elected to the Venezuelan Chamber of Deputies in the 1968 elections and 1973 elections. After the Unión Para Avanzar (UPA) was renamed Communist Party of Venezuela in 1970, he was elected president of the party in 1971, and remained its president until 1983.

A biography, Gustavo Machado: un caudillo prestado al comunismo (by José Agustín Catalá and Domingo Alberto Rangel) was published in 2001 by Ediciones Centauro. Another by Manuel Felipe Sierra, (Gustavo Machado) was published by El Nacional in 2006. The book Gustavo Machado de oligarca a comunista, 1914/1974 written by José Carlos Mariátegui et al., was published by Ediciones Centauro in 1975.

He received an honorary doctorate from the University of the Andes (Venezuela) in 1981.
