= Juan Bautista Fuenmayor =

Venezuelan politician, lawyer and historian (1905–1998)

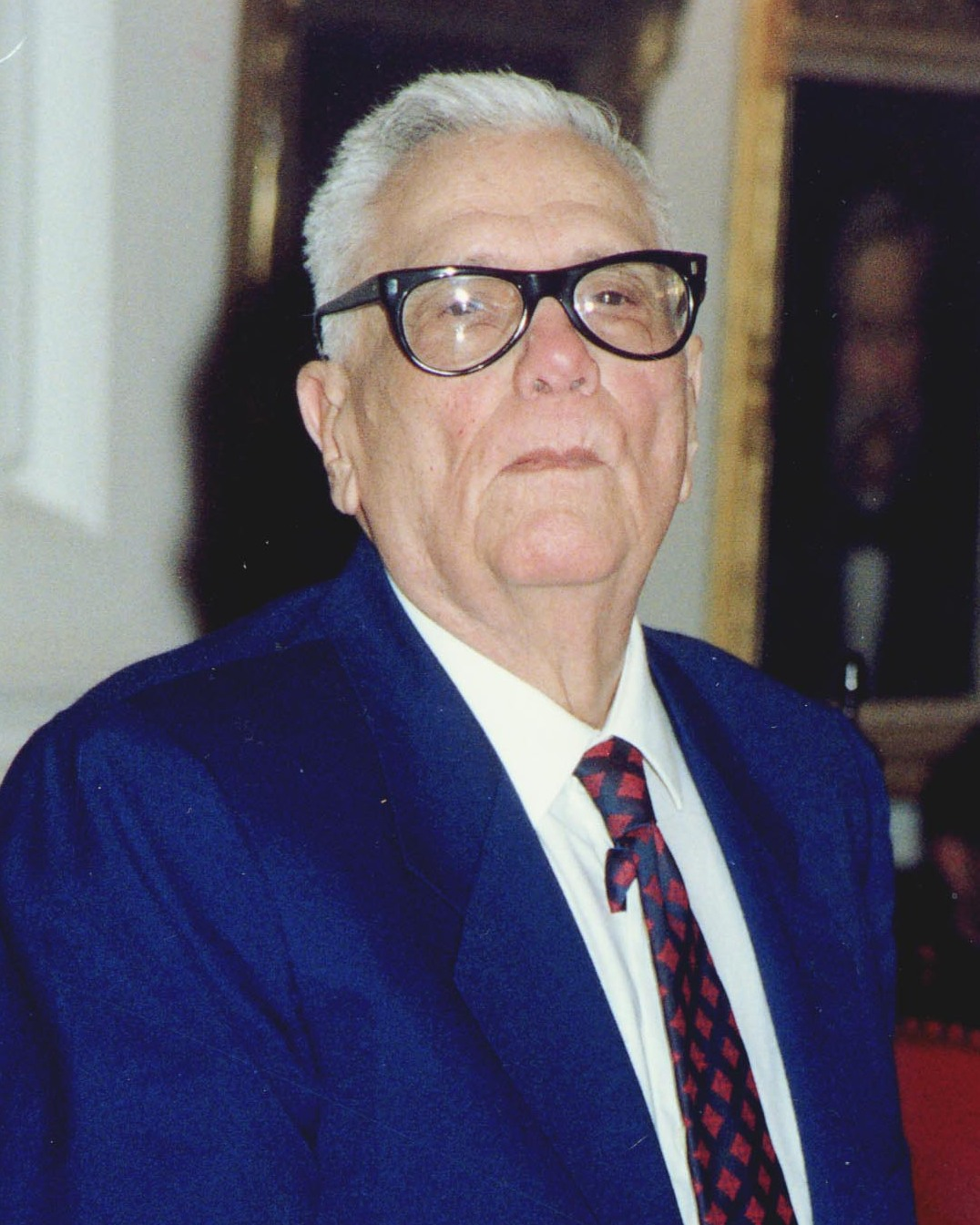
- Fuenmayor in 1991

General Secretary of the Communist Party of Venezuela
- In office 1937–1946

Personal details
- Born: 28 September 1905 Maracaibo, Venezuela
- Died: 19 May 1998 (aged 92) Los Teques, Venezuela
- Party: Communist Party of Venezuela (PCV)
- Education: Central University of Venezuela
- Occupation: Lawyer, historian, university professor

Juan Bautista Fuenmayor Rivera (28 September 1905 – 19 May 1998) was a Venezuelan politician, lawyer, university professor and historian. He was general secretary of the Communist Party of Venezuela (1937–1946) and rector of the University of Santa María University (1977–1989).

== Biography ==
In 1925, he began his studies at the Faculty of Law of the Central University of Venezuela. Three years later, in February 1928, he participated in the student protests against the dictatorship of Juan Vicente Gómez, being a member of the Generation of 28 student movement.

In 1931 Fuenmayor participated in the constitution of the first clandestine cell of the Communist Party of Venezuela (PCV). After spending several years in the prisons, he was exiled to Colombia, and was an activist of the communist party of that country during 1935. When the government of Eleazar López Contreras began, he returned to Venezuela and dedicated himself to the reorganization of the PCV. He founded the first oil workers' unions in Venezuela and in December 1936 led the first general strike in the oil industry. He was elected Secretary General of the Communist Party by the First National Conference meeting clandestinely in Maracay, in August 1937.

During his administration, Fuenmayor defended the existence of the PCV as an autonomous party of the working class, against Gustavo Machado who intended to dissolve it following the theses of Earl Browder Secretary General of the Communist Party USA. He also confronted the reformist politics of the Acción Democrática (AD) party led by Rómulo Betancourt.

In 1945 the government of Isaías Medina Angarita legalized the PCV and Fuenmayor became a member of its Political Secretariat (1946–51). He represented the state of Zulia in the National Constituent Assembly that sanctioned the constitutional text of 1947, and as a deputy in the National Congress that met in 1948.

In 1950 he opposed the participation of the communist labor movement in an insurrectionary oil strike promoted by AD against the military government supported by Britain. The Communist Party decided to participate in the strike and consequently it was outlawed. The leadership that committed the PCV to the alliance with AD, made up of Pompeyo Márquez, Gustavo Machado and others, resolved to expel Fuenmayor in April 1951. This same year he was taken prisoner by the military dictatorship and missed from his homeland the following year.

Upon his return in 1958, he devoted himself to teaching and research at the Santa María University and published several books on economics, politics, philosophy of law and twenty volumes of History of Contemporary Political Venezuela, where he analyzes the events in which he participated. In 1977 he was elected Rector of the Universidad Santa María.

Fuenmayor died in Los Teques, Venezuela, on May 19, 1998.

== See also ==
- Political prisoners in Venezuela
