= Isaac José Pardo =

Venezuelan historian and physician

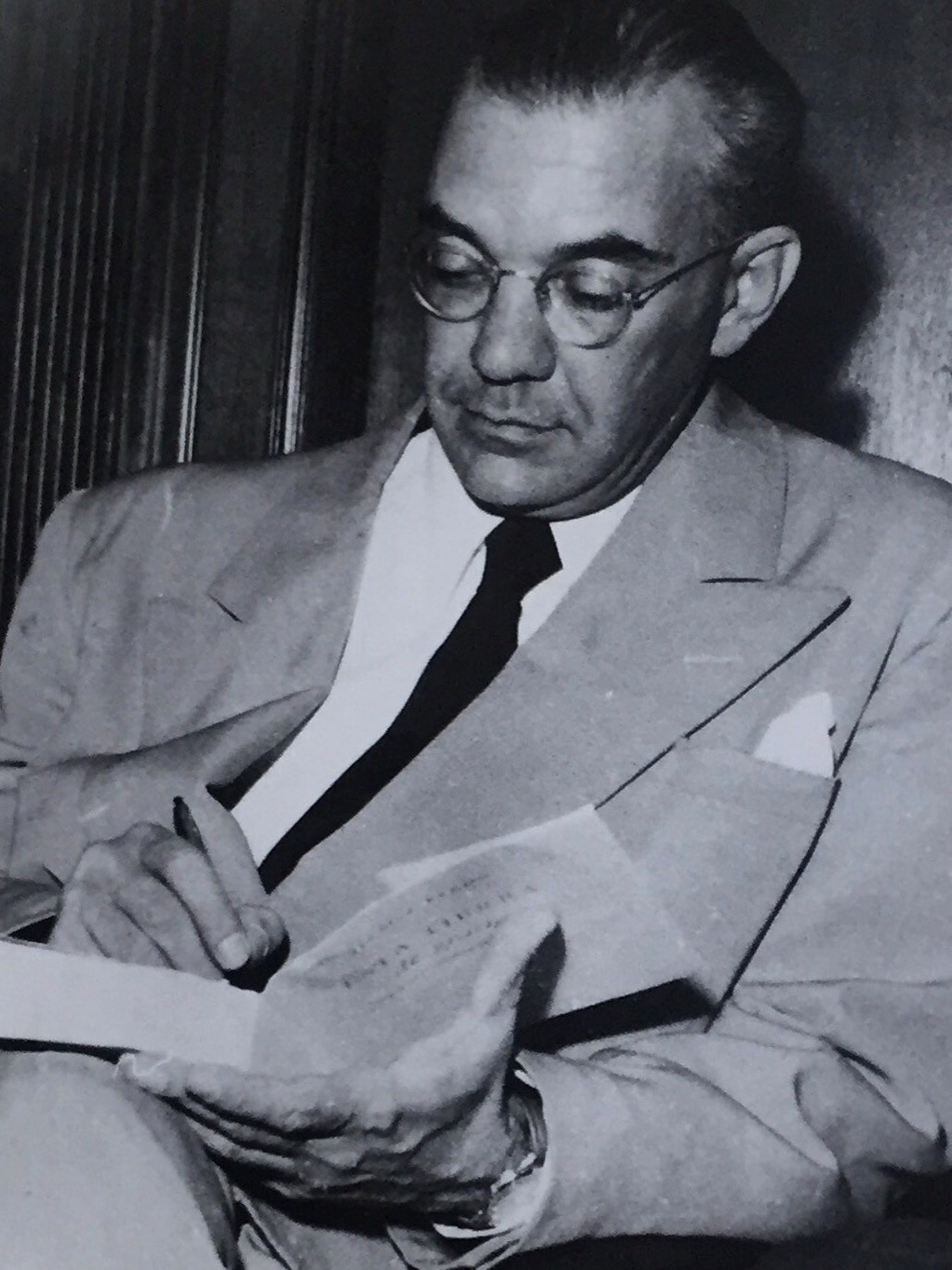
- Pardo, c. 1955
- Born: 14 October 1905; Caracas, Venezuela
- Died: 3 March 2000 (aged 94); Caracas, Venezuela
- Occupations: Historian, physician
- Writing career
- Genres: History, essay
- Subject: History of Venezuela
- Notable awards: National Prize for Literature of Venezuela; 1984

Signature
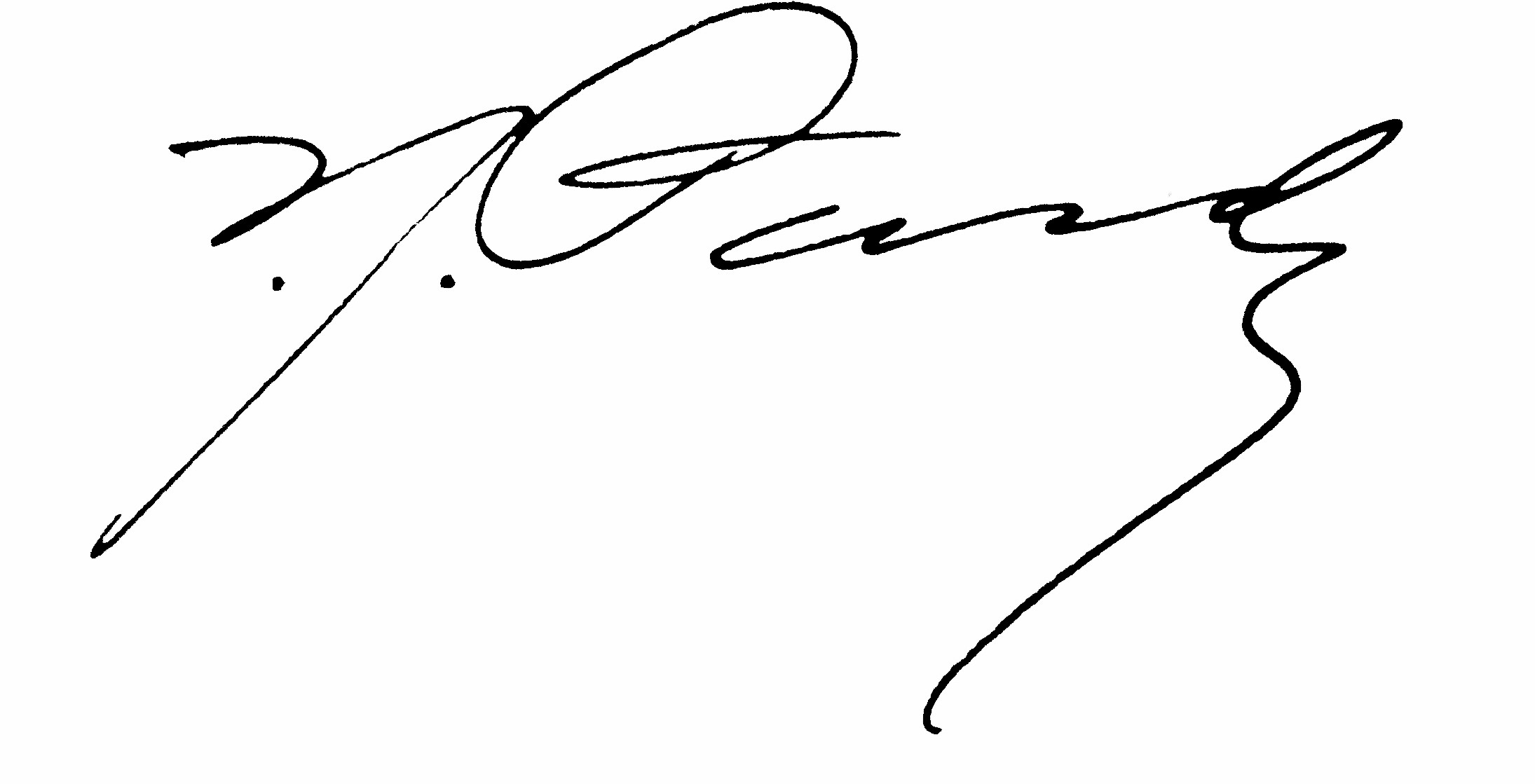

Isaac José Pardo Soublette (Caracas, 14 October 1905 - 3 March 2000), was a Venezuelan intellectual of German-Jewish extraction known for his essays: Esta tierra de gracia (1955) and Fuegos bajo el agua. La invención de la utopía (1983).

Also, was part of the Generation of 1928, movement against the dictatorship of Juan Vicente Gómez; founder of the party Unión Republicana Democrática (URD) in 1945, director of El Nacional, redactor of the humorist paper El Morrocoy Azul, and principal authority of the Supreme Electoral Council of Venezuela in 1963.

As physician, worked along with José Ignacio Baldó in the hospital of El Algodonal, facing the battle against tuberculosis in the zone.

Pardo won the National Prize for Literature in 1984. In 1999 received the Order of the Liberator and an honorary degree from the Simón Bolívar University.

The library of the CELARG, was named after him.

== Bibliography ==
- Esta tierra de gracia (1955)
- Estudio sobre Elegías de Varones Ilustres de Indias (1961)
- La ventana de Don Silverio (1978)
- Fuegos bajo el agua (1983)
- ¡Esa Palabra No se Dice! (1994)
- A la Caída de las Hojas (1997)

== See also ==
- Venezuela
- List of Venezuelan writers
