= Miguel Otero Silva =

Venezuelan writer (1908-1985)

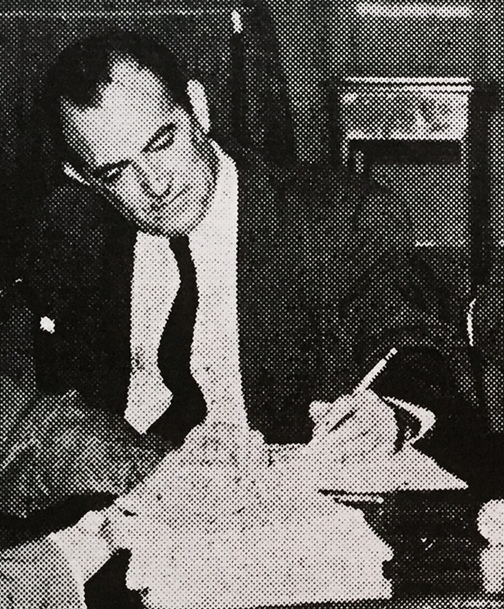
- Born: October 26, 1908; Barcelona, Anzoátegui
- Died: August 28, 1985 (aged 76); Caracas, Venezuela
- Occupations: journalist, novelist, poet, politician
- Writing career
- Notable works: Casas Muertas (1955); Oficina Nº 1 (1961); La muerte de Honorio (1963)

Miguel Otero Silva (October 26, 1908 – August 28, 1985) was a Venezuelan writer, journalist, humorist and politician. A figure of great relevance in Venezuelan literature, his literary and journalistic works related strictly to the socio-political history of Venezuela. Throughout his life, he was repeatedly forced into exile. Later on, after the establishment of a democratic state in 1958, he was elected to the Venezuelan Senate.

== Early career ==
Born in Barcelona, Anzoátegui, Otero Silva moved to Caracas at a very young age to attend high school at the Liceo Caracas. He later studied civil engineering at the Universidad Central de Venezuela. During this time, he engaged in early literary activities, writing for magazines and newspapers such as Élite and Fantoches, as well as other university publications. He also started dabbling in journalism.

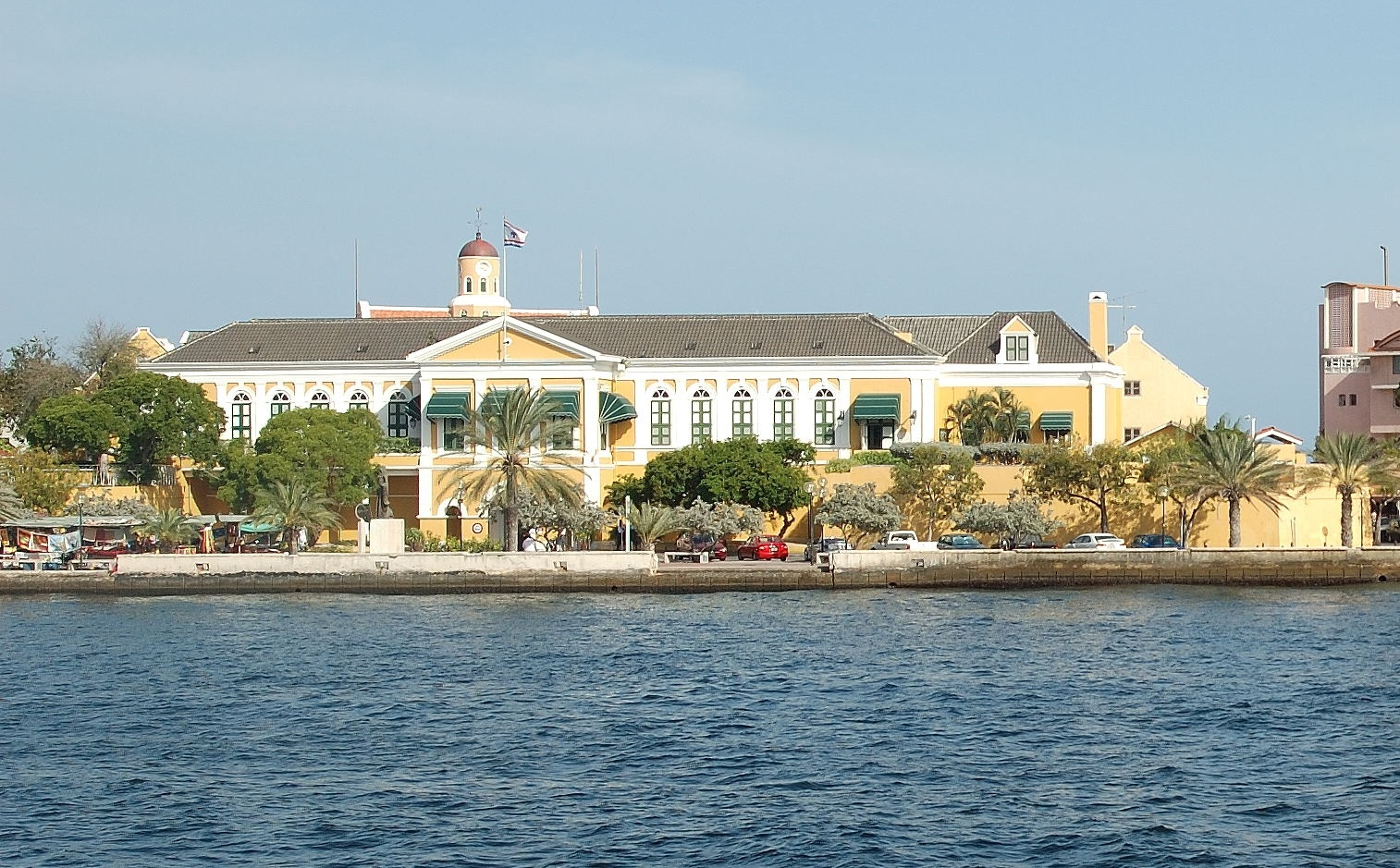
Fort Amsterdam of Willemstad, which was taken by Venezuelan revolutionaries in 1929.

During the country's Student’s Week in 1928, Otero Silva took part in a series of protests against the rule of dictator Juan Vicente Gómez (see Generation of 1928 ). He also became involved in a military plot to overthrow the government, which forced him into exile in Curaçao. In Willemstad, along with Gustavo Machado, Rafael Urbina López and other Venezuelan expatriates he participated in the assault of Fort Amsterdam on June 29 of the same year, in another attempt to overthrow president Gómez. The plot, supported by 250 men, in addition to notable communists such as José Tomás Jiménez and Guillermo Prince Lara, involved the kidnapping of governor Leonard Albert Fruytier. The revolutionaries plundered the island's weapons, ammunition and treasury and hauled governor Fruytier back to Venezuela on board the stolen American ship Maracaibo. Although the revolutionaries landed at La Vela de Coro they were defeated by Gómez' forces, and the raid ended in failure. Otero Silva was once more sent into exile, this time in Colombia. He was accompanied by Machado, Urbina, as well as other revolutionaries. During this time, Otero Silva worked on his first novel, Fiebre (Fever) dedicated to Guillermo Prince Lara, later published in 1939. By 1930 he had become affiliated with the Marxist group, Comintern.

=== 1935–1958 ===
He was able to return to Venezuela following the death of dictator Juan Vicente Gómez in 1935. Taking advantage of the freedom of speech allowed by Gómez's successor, Eleazar López Contreras, Otero Silva published humorous political poetry in newspapers. Eventually tagged as a communist, the government forced him into exile once again in 1937. During his three years of exile he travelled extensively through Mexico, United States and Colombia.

Once back in Venezuela, he co-founded the humorous weekly newspaper El Morrocoy Azul (The Blue Tortoise), along with Francisco José Delgado and Claudio Cedeño. He also founded a leftist weekly paper called, ¡Aquí Está! (Here It Is! ).

In 1943 Otero Silva's father, Henrique Otero Vizcarrondo, founded the daily newspaper El Nacional. He appointed his son head of press, which coincided with Otero Silva's resolution to study journalism at Universidad Central de Venezuela. In 1946, he married María Teresa Castillo, a fellow journalist, graduating from university in 1949. Two years later, Otero left the Communist Party of Venezuela, claiming that he wasn't ready for political discipline. Instead, he chose to dedicate himself to his writing. He spent a year in Guárico, investigating the history of the village of Ortiz, from its initial foundation to its abandonment due to a malaria outbreak. The village served as inspiration for his next novel, Casas Muertas, published in 1955. The novel was awarded the Premio Nacional de Literatura, and the Premio de Novela Arístides Rojas that same year.

His newspaper, El Nacional, was suspended twice during the military rule of Marcos Pérez Jiménez. Towards the end of the dictatorship, Otero Silva was arrested for editing and publishing the Manifiesto de los Intelectuales (Intellectuals Manifesto), a text attacking Pérez Jiménez' administration.

=== 1958–1985 ===
After Marcos Pérez Jiménez was overthrown in 1958, Otero was awarded the National Prize for Journalism and elected to the Venezuelan Senate, representing the state of Aragua. However, not long after, El Nacional was once more criticized for espousing communist and leftist ideals, this time by the new government of Rómulo Betancourt. The Government's discontent with the newspaper caused Otero Silva to resign from active journalism.

His fictional works from the period include Oficina N° 1, in 1961, and La Muerte de Honorio in 1963, along with Las Celestiales in 1965, a book of couplets with humorous references to politics, ideologies, and religion, which he signed as "Iñaki de Errandonea", a fictional Jesuit priest invented by Otero himself.

In 1967, Otero Silva was made a full member of the Academia Venezolana de la Lengua. As a senator, he promoted the creation of the Instituto Nacional de Cultura y Bellas Artes (INCIBA) in the 1970s, and participated in the founding of the Galería de Arte Nacional. In 1979, Otero was awarded the Lenin Peace Prize.

In 1985, shortly after publishing La Piedra que era Cristo, Otero Silva died in Caracas on August 28.

== Honours ==
- Premio Nacional de Literatura (1955, for the novel Casas Muertas)
- National Prize of Journalism
- Member of the Academia Venezolana de la Lengua (1967)
- Lenin Peace Prize (1979)

== Bibliography ==
=== Novels ===
- Fiebre (Fever, 1939)
- Casas Muertas (Dead Houses, 1955)
- Oficina N° 1 (Office N° 1, 1961)
- La Muerte de Honorio (The Death of Honorio, 1963)
- Cuando quiero llorar no lloro (When I want to cry, I don't, 1970)
- Lope de Aguirre, Príncipe de la Libertad (Lope de Aguirre, Prince of Freedom, 1979)
- La Piedra que era Cristo (The Stone that was Christ, 1985)

=== Poetry ===
- Agua y Cauce (Water and Ditch, 1937)
- 25 poemas (25 poems, 1942)
- Elegía coral a Andrés Eloy Blanco (Coral Elegy to Andrés Eloy Blanco, 1958)
- La Mar que es el Morir (1965)
- Las Celestiales (The Celestials, 1965)
- Umbral (1966)
