= Juan Oropeza =

Venezuelan lawyer and diplomat (1906–1971)

Juan Oropeza Riera (24 April 1906 – 29 November 1971) was a Venezuelan lawyer, diplomat, writer, educator and political scientist. He was born in Carora in the state of Lara, and was the younger brother of pediatrics pioneer, Pastor Oropeza Riera.

== Biography ==
In his youth, he opposed the dictatorial regime of President Juan Vicente Gómez and became a member of the student-led movement called "Generation of 1928". He was imprisoned and eventually sent into exile with some of the other group members. In 1931, he worked as a correspondent for Élite Magazine in Madrid, Spain. Upon his return to Venezuela he became a founding member of Acción Democrática, one of the two most prominent political parties in the nation's republican history, alongside such important figures as Luis Beltrán Prieto Figueroa, Mariano Picón Salas and later Venezuelan President Rómulo Betancourt.

In 1944, he married Venezuelan Alicia Sosa in the state of Sonora, Mexico. After the coup d'état that ousted Isaias Medina Angarita, he was appointed rector of the Universidad Central de Venezuela, a post he held from 1945 to 1946, and was subsequently appointed Venezuela's ambassador to the United Kingdom under President Rómulo Gallegos's term.

He took up Paris as his permanent residence during the dictatorship of Marcos Pérez Jiménez, where he befriended such personalities as poet Paul Éluard, writers Jorge Luis Borges, Nicolás Guillén, Miguel Ángel Asturias and painters Salvador Dalí, Marie Laurencin and Pablo Picasso.

In the 1960s, he continued his duties as the Venezuelan ambassador in Paris for Rómulo Betancourt's administration. During that time, he was also chosen to represent Venezuela as its ambassador before UNESCO and, during Raúl Leoni's presidency, was assigned to the position of Venezuelan ambassador in Bogotá, Colombia. He received the Orden del Libertador (first class) and the Orden Francisco de Miranda, as well as the Orden del Águila Azteca (Mexico) in recognition for his outstanding academic skills. He was an arts and literature professor at the University of Minnesota. Some of his literary works include: Sucre, Cuatro siglos de historia venezolana, En perpetua fuga, Sobre Inglaterra y los ingleses, Imparidad del destino americano, Breve Historia de Venezuela, Fronteras and Del tiempo en que vivimos.

Juan Oropeza died of cancer in Caracas on 29 November 1971, at the age of 65.

== See also ==
- Political prisoners in Venezuela
