= Communist Party of Venezuela =

Political party in Venezuela

Communist Party of Venezuela Partido Comunista de Venezuela
- Abbreviation: PCV
- General Secretary: Óscar Figuera
- Founded: 5 March 1931; 95 years ago
- Headquarters: Calle Jesús Faría, Parroquia San Juan, Caracas
- Newspaper: Popular Tribune
- Youth wing: Communist Youth of Venezuela
- Ideology: Communism; Marxism–Leninism
- Political position: Far-left
- National affiliation: Popular Revolutionary Alternative
- Regional affiliation: São Paulo Forum
- International affiliation: IMCWP
- Colors: Red and yellow
- Slogan: ¡El socialismo sigue siendo la esperanza de los pueblos! ('Socialism is still the hope of the people!')
- Anthem: "La Internacional" ('The Internationale')
- National Assembly: 4 / 285
- Governors of States of Venezuela: 0 / 23
- Mayors: 8 / 335

Website
- www.pcv-venezuela.org

The Communist Party of Venezuela (Spanish: Partido Comunista de Venezuela, PCV) is a Marxist-Leninist party in Venezuela founded in 1931. It is the oldest active political party in Venezuela, and was the country's main leftist party until it fractured into rival factions in 1971. In 2023, the Party split again on the issue of support or opposition to the government of Nicolás Maduro.

== History ==
The PCV was founded in 1931 as a clandestine organization during the military dictatorship of Juan Vicente Gómez. It was initially led by Juan Bautista Fuenmayor and Francisco José "Kotepa" Delgado. The PCV became the Venezuelan affiliate of the Communist International. A forerunner of the PCV, the Venezuelan Revolutionary Party, had been founded in exile in Mexico in 1926 and attempted a rebellion in Venezuela in 1929.

The PCV remained an illegal organization until 1941, when it entered into an alliance with the progressive military regime of Isaías Medina Angarita, following orders from Comintern for communist parties throughout the world to support governments that aided the allied war effort. During this time it published the weekly newspaper ¡Aquí Está!. The PCV was outlawed during the conservative military dictatorship of Marcos Pérez Jiménez (1948–1958), when it played a key role in organizing the clandestine resistance to the regime, alongside activist from the (also banned) party Democratic Action.

In 1952, despite remaining an illegal organization, PCV provided key support to the non-communist leftist party URD in elections organized by the military regime to legitimize its rule. When URD's election victory became apparent, the military ordered the ballot counting process stopped and refused to accept its defeat at the hands of the communist-supported opposition. The episode shifted the balance of power in the military from relative moderates to the hard-line faction led by Marcos Pérez Jiménez, which substantially stepped up efforts to repress the clandestine opposition.

The PCV was not included in the power-sharing 1958 Puntofijo Pact that would underpin the country's transition to democracy. Appearing on a Venezuelan election ballot for the first time in the 1958 election, PCV backed the candidacy of URD's Wolfgang Larrazábal and received 3.2% of the vote (84,451 votes), contributing towards Larrazábal's total of 34.88%. The figure understates the party's influence in Venezuelan politics at the time, which stemmed less from its mass support than from its highly disciplined internal organization, including many full-time party organizers, and its ideological and financial ties to the Soviet Union.

In the early 1960s, inspired by the Cuban Revolution, the party became much more radical and launched a guerrilla war against the newly elected AD government led by Rómulo Betancourt, causing it to be outlawed once more. The PCV guerrilla effort was unable to mobilize substantial support from the Venezuelan peasantry, which largely supported Betancourt's reformism, and was unable to mount a serious military challenge to the new regime. Disillusioned with the guerrilla experience, the majority of PCV members split away from the party in 1971 to enter electoral politics as part of the reformist Movement toward Socialism (MAS). At the same time, a much smaller group of activists split off to form the trade-union based party La Causa Radical, better known as Causa R, a forerunner of today's Patria Para Todos party. Remaining communist fighters were later given a general amnesty by President Rafael Caldera as part of his "pacificacion" process. In the following years, the PCV became a marginal force in Venezuelan politics. The party received 0.7% of the national vote in the 1973 elections, 0.5% in the 1978 election, 1% in 1983, and 0.3% in both the 1988 and 1993 elections: with its high-water mark coming in 1983, with 67,681 votes. In the 1993 presidential elections, the PCV endorsed Rafael Caldera, a member of the Convergencia alliance. PCV broke with President Caldera in 1996.

=== During the Bolivarian era ===
In the presidential elections of 1998, the PCV backed Hugo Chávez adding 81,979 votes (1.25% of the national vote) to Chávez's total of 3,673,685 votes. In the 2006 presidential election, the PCV ticket received 2.9% of the National vote, contributing a haul of 342,227 to Chávez's total of 7,309,080 votes. These results make PCV the 4th largest party in the Chávez coalition. Following the December 2005 legislative election, eight PCV members were elected as deputies to the National Assembly: Roberto Hernández, Diluvina Cabello, Germán Ferrer, Oscar Figuera, Edgar Lucena, Chiche Manaure, Omar Marcano, and David Velásquez. The PCV has articulated its belief that the transition to socialism in Venezuela will be slow and evolutionary. The party was a small but vocal part of the Chávez governing coalition.

In the presidential elections of 2012, the PCV again backed Chavez. Its ticket contributed 3.28% of the National vote, making PCV the second largest party in the Chavez coalition. The PCV won 1.6% in the 2013 municipal elections, up from 1.4% in the 2008 municipal elections.

In the 2018 Venezuelan presidential election, the PCV endorsed Nicolas Maduro. In August 2020, Popular Revolutionary Alternative (PCV) distanced itself from Maduro, with party leader Óscar Figuera affirming that the party would not support President Maduro if he failed to change the economic policies. In September 2020, Figuera denounced Maduro, claiming that the PCV was being disproportionately attacked by Maduro's government.Its leaders accused the Maduro government of advancing a "liberal and subservient" policy and subsequently joined the rebellious Chavista parties that formed the PCV list for the parliamentary elections.

During the period February-April 2023, members of the Party who were dissatisfied its political line under Secretary-General Figuera held five regional conferences and then an 'Extraordinary Congress' in Caracas on 21 May. Their principal criticism of Figuera was that his attacks on Maduro were in effect putting the Party on the side of imperialism versus the Bolivarian revolution. According to a history of this period compiled by the anti-Figuera group, their Extraordinary Congress represented 17 States and was attended by 520 delegates. At the Extraordinary Congress it was decided to apply to the Venezuelan Supreme Tribunal of Justice for redress of alleged anti-democratic practices by the Figuera leadership group.

The Supreme Tribunal found that:

citizen Oscar Figuera, in his capacity as Secretary General of the Central Committee of the Political Bureau of the Communist Party of Venezuela (PCV), has failed to convene the grassroots organisations, and has prevented the organisation’s congresses from being held, thereby preventing the membership from acting in accordance with the statutes and, more importantly, exercising the leadership of the organisation in violation of the principle of alternation that informs the right of political association as required by the aforementioned Article 67 of the Constitution of the Bolivarian Republic of Venezuela. [Judgment No. 1.160 – 10/08/2023]

The Tribunal appointed an ad hoc board of directors consisting of seven PCV members, led by Comrade Henry Parra (former CC member, recruited by PCV Youth, 1973) to "restore the right of association and participation of all members" of the Party.

On 14 December 2023, Figuera appealed the ruling to the Constitutional Chamber of the Tribunal but it was upheld (Judgment No. 0061, 6 February 2024).

The Tribunal's decision did not expel Figuera from the PCV but ordered him to cooperate with the ad hoc board. The Figuera group did not comply with that order because they considered the Tribunal to be a bourgeois court.

As of June 2025 there are two entities calling themselves the Communist Party of Venezuela, one led by Figuera and the other by Parra.

According to the organ of the Figuera PCV, Popular Tribune, on 20 March 2024 the Venezuelan government under Maduro proclaimed Maduro the PCV candidate for the upcoming presidential election, in contravention to the Figuera PCV's declaration of support for independent candidate Enrique Márquez at its 16th National Conference three days earlier.

== Press ==
The PCV publishes Debate Abierto (Open Debate), edited by Carolus Wimmer, and Tribuna Popular (Popular Tribune). The youth wing of PCV is Juventud Comunista de Venezuela (Communist Youth of Venezuela).
