= Elections in Venezuela =

Elections in Venezuela are held at a national level for the President of Venezuela as head of state and head of government, and for a unicameral legislature. The President is elected for a six-year term by direct election plurality voting and is eligible for re-election. The National Assembly (Asamblea Nacional) has 277 members (diputados), elected for five-year terms using a mixed-member majoritarian representation system. Elections also take place at state level and local level.

Since 1998, elections in Venezuela have been automated (using touchscreen DRE voting machines which provide a Voter Verified Paper Audit Trail), and administered by the National Electoral Council. The voting age is 18, and (as of 2011) 95% of eligible voters are legally registered.

Prior to the early 1990s, Venezuela was considered an unusually long-standing and stable liberal democracy in Latin America, having transitioned to democracy in 1958. After the victory of socialist populist Hugo Chávez in the 1998 presidential election, Venezuela gradually underwent democratic backsliding before transitioning to an authoritarian system of government where political and civil rights are not protected, and elections are not free and fair. Under Chávez's rule and later under the rule of his successor Nicolás Maduro, power has been concentrated in the hands of the executive, institutional checks and balances have been undermined, independent media have been repressed, and opposition forces have been marginalized in governing institutions, such as congress, courts, oversight agencies, the state-owned petroleum company (PDVSA), and the military.

Politics are polarized between supporters of former President Nicolás Maduro, organized as the United Socialist Party (PSUV) and the Great Patriotic Pole, and several opposition parties. Opposition parties and opposition candidates have regularly been banned from contesting elections. At other times, opposition parties have boycotted national elections, citing their undemocratic nature. Venezuela was ranked the third least electoral democracy in Latin America and the Caribbean according to V-Dem Democracy indices in 2023 with a score of 0.214 out of one.

== Result ==
=== 2000 Venezuelan parliamentary election ===
| Party | Votes | % | Seats |
|---|---|---|---|
| Fifth Republic Movement | 1,977,992 | 44.38 | 92 |
| Democratic Action (Venezuela) | 718,148 | 16.11 | 33 |
| Project Venezuela | 309,168 | 6.94 | 6 |
| Copei | 227,349 | 5.10 | 6 |
| Movement for Socialism (Venezuela) | 224,170 | 5.03 | 6 |
| Radical Cause | 196,787 | 4.41 | 3 |
| Justice First | 109,900 | 2.47 | 5 |
| Fatherland for All | 101,246 | 2.27 | 1 |
| A New Era | 78,109 | 1.75 | 3 |
| Fearless People's Alliance | 49,218 | 1.10 | 0 |
| Voters of Miranda | 48,291 | 1.08 | 0 |
| National Convergence | 47,620 | 1.07 | 4 |
| Democratic Left | 37,230 | 0.84 | 0 |
| National Encounter | 37,036 | 0.83 | 0 |
| United for Human Rights | 33,669 | 0.76 | 0 |
| MIGATO | 21,044 | 0.47 | 1 |
| Movement for Direct Democracy | 19,856 | 0.45 | 0 |
| Communist Party of Venezuela | 15,997 | 0.36 | 0 |
| Independent Solidarity | 15,272 | 0.34 | 0 |
| Red Flag Party | 14,273 | 0.32 | 0 |
| National Integration Movement | 11,234 | 0.25 | 0 |
| Organisation Force in Motion | 10,547 | 0.24 | 0 |
| Formula 1 (political party) | 10,163 | 0.23 | 0 |
| Independents for National Community | 7,760 | 0.17 | 0 |
| FCT | 6,869 | 0.15 | 0 |
| Builders of a Country | 6,259 | 0.14 | 0 |
| Caroni Decides | 8,788 | 0.20 | 0 |
| Emerging People | 5,044 | 0.11 | 0 |
| New Democratic Regime | 4,403 | 0.10 | 0 |
| Organised Renovation And Emerging Group | 4,050 | 0.09 | 0 |
| Revolutionary Apureño Movement | 3,952 | 0.09 | 0 |
| People's Electoral Movement (Venezuela) | 3,738 | 0.08 | 0 |
| Social Democratic Alliance | 3,173 | 0.07 | 0 |
| Advanced Regional Movement | 2,939 | 0.07 | 0 |
| Independent Regional Emerging Movement | 2,686 | 0.06 | 0 |
| Voluntariado | 2,643 | 0.06 | 0 |
| Democratic Republican Union | 2,641 | 0.06 | 0 |
| Acijusta | 2,561 | 0.06 | 0 |
| Communities United for Reason and Self-Esteem | 2,493 | 0.06 | 0 |
| Trabuco Mirandino | 2,448 | 0.05 | 0 |
| Justice Patrol | 2,439 | 0.05 | 0 |
| Integration, Representation and New Hope | 2,401 | 0.05 | 0 |
| United for Vargas | 2,348 | 0.05 | 0 |
| Ospinero Independent Front for Portuguesa | 2,311 | 0.05 | 0 |
| Iniciativa Propia | 2,163 | 0.05 | 0 |
| Organised Independent Indigenous Movement | 1,967 | 0.04 | 0 |
| United Multi-Ethnic Peoples of Amazonas | 1,837 | 0.04 | 1 |
| Out of Love for Venezuela | 1,751 | 0.04 | 0 |
| MDD | 1,733 | 0.04 | 0 |
| Organised Citizen Option | 1,720 | 0.04 | 0 |
| Towards the Good Homeland | 1,683 | 0.04 | 0 |
| Social Cause | 1,659 | 0.04 | 0 |
| Optimistic People | 1,540 | 0.03 | 0 |
| New Insular Generation | 1,509 | 0.03 | 0 |
| Renewing Democracy 2000 | 1,505 | 0.03 | 0 |
| Movimiento Civilista Adelante Cojedes | 1,398 | 0.03 | 0 |
| Citizens in Action | 1,274 | 0.03 | 0 |
| Voluntariado Organizado Zuliano | 1,181 | 0.03 | 0 |
| Reto Popular Merideño | 1,112 | 0.02 | 0 |
| Authentic Renewal Organization | 1,066 | 0.02 | 0 |
| Comando de Partecipación Comunitaria | 995 | 0.02 | 0 |
| National Opinion | 956 | 0.02 | 0 |
| Movimiento Patriotico Ciudadano "Yo Existo" | 936 | 0.02 | 0 |
| Vision Social Constituyente | 927 | 0.02 | 0 |
| Apoyo Profesional | 912 | 0.02 | 0 |
| Organización Contra el Abuso | 762 | 0.02 | 0 |
| Fuerza Popular | 747 | 0.02 | 0 |
| Caricuao Somos Todos | 740 | 0.02 | 0 |
| Depostistas | 711 | 0.02 | 0 |
| Rompe el Silencio | 695 | 0.02 | 0 |
| Movimiento Ecologico para la Vida | 693 | 0.02 | 0 |
| Pueblo Revolucionario al Cambio y Desarrollo Larense | 688 | 0.02 | 0 |
| Movimiento Democratico | 687 | 0.02 | 1 |
| Fuerza Activa de Partecipación | 635 | 0.01 | 0 |
| Partecipación Popular | 590 | 0.01 | 0 |
| Frente Civico de Militantes Zulianos | 576 | 0.01 | 0 |
| Movimiento 100 | 567 | 0.01 | 0 |
| Frente Insular Organizado de Electores | 547 | 0.01 | 0 |
| Patriotas Revolucionarios Independientes | 545 | 0.01 | 0 |
| Decision de Portuguesa | 544 | 0.01 | 0 |
| Poder Vecinal | 535 | 0.01 | 0 |
| Movimiento Unitario Real Opcion | 527 | 0.01 | 0 |
| Foro Democratico | 524 | 0.01 | 0 |
| Opening for National Participation | 522 | 0.01 | 0 |
| Movimiento Republicano | 511 | 0.01 | 0 |
| Guaiqueres en Acción | 509 | 0.01 | 0 |
| Frente Nacionalista Maisanta | 508 | 0.01 | 0 |
| Movimiento De Base Parroquial Zuliano | 508 | 0.01 | 0 |
| RC | 472 | 0.01 | 0 |
| TU CAMINO | 457 | 0.01 | 0 |
| ARENA | 455 | 0.01 | 0 |
| MOV 20 | 451 | 0.01 | 0 |
| REALCI | 429 | 0.01 | 0 |
| CAMVIO | 403 | 0.01 | 0 |
| FALCONIA | 396 | 0.01 | 0 |
| AR | 386 | 0.01 | 0 |
| DP | 379 | 0.01 | 0 |
| EL | 372 | 0.01 | 0 |
| SOLUCION | 370 | 0.01 | 0 |
| MIAU | 368 | 0.01 | 0 |
| APD | 363 | 0.01 | 0 |
| M2000 | 359 | 0.01 | 0 |
| ACTIVE | 356 | 0.01 | 0 |
| VOTAUNIDOS | 351 | 0.01 | 0 |
| CENUREPU | 350 | 0.01 | 0 |
| PODER MORAL | 341 | 0.01 | 0 |
| G CONDOR | 332 | 0.01 | 0 |
| IPRS | 329 | 0.01 | 0 |
| OPC REG 98 | 327 | 0.01 | 0 |
| PROY III MELENIO | 322 | 0.01 | 0 |
| MCR 200 | 320 | 0.01 | 0 |
| FPC | 313 | 0.01 | 0 |
| CON | 312 | 0.01 | 0 |
| MP | 307 | 0.01 | 0 |
| NFG | 289 | 0.01 | 0 |
| PPA | 289 | 0.01 | 0 |
| CON GUARICO | 285 | 0.01 | 0 |
| MDR | 285 | 0.01 | 0 |
| SOID SIGLO XXI | 269 | 0.01 | 0 |
| EL PODER 7 | 261 | 0.01 | 0 |
| TRIPLE C | 256 | 0.01 | 0 |
| IND AL 2000 | 241 | 0.01 | 0 |
| MEV VARGAS | 239 | 0.01 | 0 |
| ASIR | 238 | 0.01 | 0 |
| AB 2000 | 237 | 0.01 | 0 |
| IAP | 228 | 0.01 | 0 |
| FT | 223 | 0.01 | 0 |
| VARGAS AL PRO | 223 | 0.01 | 0 |
| IPV | 216 | 0.00 | 0 |
| VEA | 216 | 0.00 | 0 |
| BS21 | 214 | 0.00 | 0 |
| MHM | 202 | 0.00 | 0 |
| UVI | 193 | 0.00 | 0 |
| IS | 187 | 0.00 | 0 |
| AMI | 180 | 0.00 | 0 |
| PN | 169 | 0.00 | 0 |
| FRD | 163 | 0.00 | 0 |
| CORDIALIDAD | 144 | 0.00 | 0 |
| POPA | 129 | 0.00 | 0 |
| MOREI 2000 | 116 | 0.00 | 0 |
| VEA | 109 | 0.00 | 0 |
| T UCLAS | 103 | 0.00 | 0 |
| MOCI | 101 | 0.00 | 0 |
| MLI | 100 | 0.00 | 0 |
| MRG 2000 | 100 | 0.00 | 0 |
| AV 98 | 94 | 0.00 | 0 |
| CONPACO | 94 | 0.00 | 0 |
| PACIFICO | 90 | 0.00 | 0 |
| SER | 88 | 0.00 | 0 |
| POETA | 84 | 0.00 | 0 |
| AI | 80 | 0.00 | 0 |
| MIO | 77 | 0.00 | 0 |
| INITA | 74 | 0.00 | 0 |
| MIA AMAZONAS | 71 | 0.00 | 0 |
| PM | 71 | 0.00 | 0 |
| DEPURACION | 70 | 0.00 | 0 |
| FAI | 64 | 0.00 | 0 |
| CFPI | 61 | 0.00 | 0 |
| PCMI | 58 | 0.00 | 0 |
| MJPT | 57 | 0.00 | 0 |
| MUPI | 49 | 0.00 | 0 |
| OPIC | 48 | 0.00 | 0 |
| GIR AMAZONAS | 41 | 0.00 | 0 |
| MOVE | 40 | 0.00 | 0 |
| MU CAMBIO | 39 | 0.00 | 0 |
| DR 2000 | 38 | 0.00 | 0 |
| INCVF | 35 | 0.00 | 0 |
| MOVES 21 | 33 | 0.00 | 0 |
| PARTICIPA | 21 | 0.00 | 0 |
| MEAI | 13 | 0.00 | 0 |
| MIRA | 8 | 0.00 | 0 |
| TSV | 8 | 0.00 | 0 |
| CI | 5 | 0.00 | 0 |
| National Council of Venezuelan Indians | | | 3 |
| Total | 4,457,296 | 100.00 | 165 |

=== 2025 Venezuelan parliamentary election ===
| Party | Votes | % | Seats | +/– |
|---|---|---|---|---|
| Great Patriotic Pole | 5,024,475 | 83.54 | 256 | 0 |
| Democratic Alliance | 361,769 | 6.02 | 13 | –7 |
| UNT–UNICA | 304,425 | 5.06 | 11 | New |
| Neighborhood Force | 141,588 | 2.35 | 4 | +4 |
| Pencil Alliance | 181,926 | 3.02 | 1 | New |
| Other parties | 181,926 | 3.02 | 0 | – |
| Indigenous seats | | | 3 | 0 |
| Total | 6,014,183 | 100.00 | 288 | +8 |
| Valid votes | 6,014,183 | 99.85 | | |
| Invalid/blank votes | 8,813 | 0.15 | | |
| Total votes | 6,022,996 | 100.00 | | |
Source: Ultimas Notcias

== History ==
=== 1811–1889: First congress and presidents ===
On 18 April 1810, agents of the Spanish Regency arrived in the city of Caracas. After considerable political tumult, the local nobility announced an extraordinary open hearing of the cabildo (the municipal council) on 19 April. On that day, an expanded municipal government of Caracas took power in the name of Ferdinand VII, calling itself The Supreme Junta to Preserve the Rights of Ferdinand VII. The Caracas Junta called for the convention of a congress of the Venezuelan provinces which began meeting the following March, at which time the Junta dissolved itself. Francisco de Miranda was elected to the Congress and began agitating for independence.

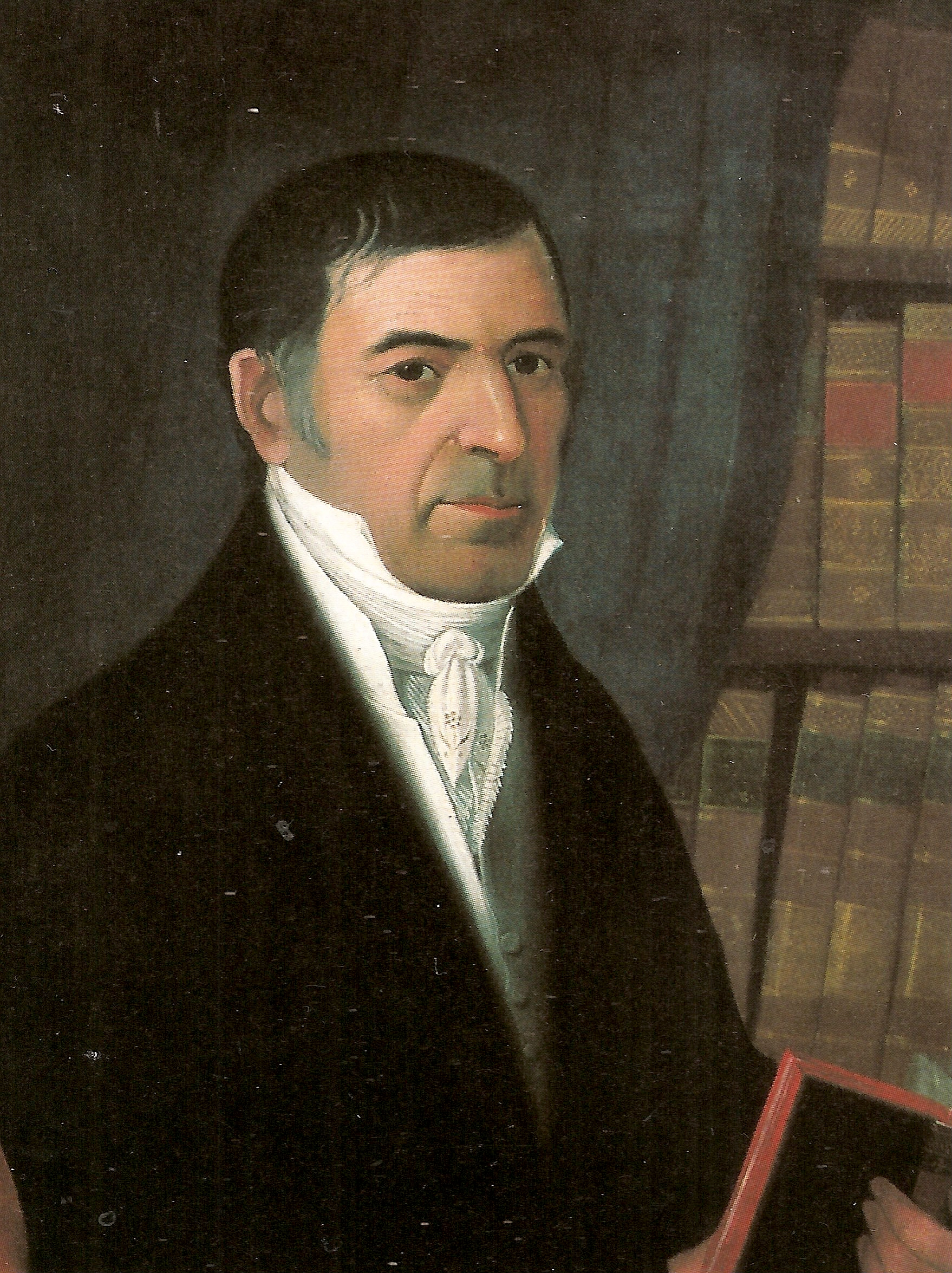
Cristóbal Mendoza, first president of the First Republic of Venezuela, took office on July 5, 1811. All three initial presidents had been signatories on the Venezuelan Declaration of Independence.

In March 1811 during the Spanish American wars of independence, the first Venezuelan constitutional congress established the executive power a triumvirate in which three men shared executive power and rotated the presidency every week. Cristóbal Mendoza became a member of the triumvirate that headed the First Republic of Venezuela and was unanimously elected by the other two as the first to go in rotation on 5 March 1811. Mendoza was author of the Venezuelan Declaration of Independence, formally issued on 5 July 1811, on which date the presidential designation also took effect. The first Constitution of the Republic of Venezuela was designed in December 1811. The Congress established a Confederation called the United States of Venezuela in the Constitution, crafted mostly by lawyer Juan Germán Roscio, that it ratified on 21 December 1811. The Constitution created a strong bicameral legislature and, as also happened in neighboring New Granada, the Congress kept the weak executive consisting of a triumvirate.

A second triumvirate followed on April 3, 1812. The presidency was disestablished in 1813, when Simon Bolivar established the Third Republic of Venezuela (1817–1819). In 1830, José Antonio Páez declared Venezuela independent from Gran Colombia and became president, taking office on January 13, 1830. Presidents of Venezuela who served under the 1864 constitution (starting with Juan Crisóstomo Falcón) bore the title of "President of the Union", instead of the usual "President of the Republic" still used today. Aside from that, all heads of state of the country since 1811 have held the title of "President of Venezuela."

According to Raul L. Madrid, the first free and fair elections in Venezuela (and in South America) was the 1834 Venezuelan presidential election, which was won by José María Vargas.

=== 1900–1989: First democratic elections ===
El Trienio Adeco was a period in Venezuelan history from 1945 to 1948 under the government of Democratic Action, a party which gained office via the 1945 Venezuelan coup d'état against President Isaías Medina Angarita of the two-year-old Venezuelan Democratic Party. El Trienio Adeco saw the first democratic elections in Venezuelan history, beginning with the Constituent Assembly elections held in Venezuela on 27 October 1946, Democratic Action, which won 137 of the 160 seats in the Assembly. Voter turnout was 86.6%.

General elections held in Venezuela on 14 December 1947 are described as the first honest elections in Venezuela. At the time, there were 110 seats in the Chamber of Deputies and 46 seats in the Senate, with Democratic Action winning a majority of both.

The 1948 Venezuelan coup d'état took place on 24 November 1948, when elected president Rómulo Gallegos was overthrown a year after his election. Democracy would not be restored until the 1958 Venezuelan coup d'état overthrew the dictator Marcos Pérez Jiménez.

A referendum on the presidential term and national and regional governors was held on 15 December 1957, resulting in the referendum's approval. Voters were asked whether they approved of President Marcos Pérez Jiménez remaining in power without fresh elections, and appointing government nominees as members of the national parliament, regional assemblies and local councils. The referendum was held under non-democratic conditions. Jiménez was overthrown the following year.

In the 7 December 1958 general elections, voter turnout was recorded at 94.4% in the presidential election and 92.1% in the Congressional elections. Democratic Action again swept the elections, winning the presidency and two majorities.

=== 1990–1999: Later constitutions ===
The 1998 presidential election was the first to be carried out with a new National Electoral Council. Traditionally poll workers had been provided by the parties, but in this election "a lottery was set up to draft 300,000 registered voters as poll workers". The elections also saw "the world's first automated voting system, which featured a single integrated electronic network that was supposed to transmit the results from the polling stations to central headquarters within minutes." The automated vote system enabled the Electoral Council to announce the results within 2.5 hours of the polls closing. After corroborating the results with the Carter Center, the losing candidate conceded several hours later. In the 1998 presidential elections, one of candidate Hugo Chávez's electoral promises was to organize a referendum asking the people if they wanted to convene a National Constituent Assembly. His first decree as president was thus to order such a referendum, which took place on 19 April. The electorate were asked two questions – whether a constituent assembly should be convened, and whether it should follow the mechanisms proposed by the president. The 1998 parliamentary elections were on 8 November 1998. There were 207 seats in the Chamber of Deputies and 54 seats in the Senate.

Under the new Bolivarian 1999 Constitution, the legislative branch of Government in Venezuela is represented by a unicameral National Assembly. The Assembly is made up of 165 deputies (diputados), who are elected by "universal, direct, personal, and secret" vote on a national party-list proportional representation system. In addition, three deputies are returned on a state-by-state basis, and three seats were reserved for representatives of Venezuela's indigenous peoples. All deputies serve five-year terms. In 1999 a two-term limit of six years each was established for the President of Venezuela.

=== 2000–present: Recent elections ===
In 2007 the leading Fifth Republic Movement (MVR) party dissolved and the United Socialist Party of Venezuela (PSUV) formed as the leading government party. On 15 August 2007, PSUV founder and Venezuelan President Hugo Chávez proposed an amendment to 33 articles of Venezuela's 350-article Constitution. Chávez stated that the proposed constitutional reforms were needed to complete the transition to a socialist republic and to implement his Bolivarian Revolution. The proposal was narrowly defeated by 51 to 49 percent. In 2009 a constitutional referendum resulted in the abolition of term limits for the office of President of Venezuela.

The 2010 parliamentary elections took place on 26 September 2010 to elect the 165 deputies to the National Assembly. Venezuelan opposition parties (which had boycotted the previous 2005 election, thus allowing the MVR to gain a supermajority) participated in the election through the Coalition for Democratic Unity (MUD).

The National Electoral council scheduled regional elections for 16 December 2012 to elect state governors and state legislators, with PSUV winning the governorships of 20 of the 23 states. Voter turnout was 53%.

New versions of the Basic Law of Electoral Processes (Spanish: Ley Orgánica de Procesos Electorales, LOPE) were issued by the CNE on 7 June 2012 and 18 January 2013.

Venezuela's municipal elections were delayed from their intended date of 14 April 2013 after the death of President Hugo Chávez on 5 March 2013, as a new presidential election was also scheduled for 14 April. Winning the vote by a narrow margin, Nicolás Maduro was sworn in as the new president on 19 April 2013. After around an eight-month delay, municipal elections on December 8, 2013, elected 337 mayors and 2,455 local councillors for their respective 2013–2017 terms.

The parliamentary elections in 2015 took place on 6 December 2015 to elect the 164 deputies and three indigenous representatives of the National Assembly. The result was a decisive defeat for the ruling PSUV, which lost control of the Assembly for the first time since 1999. The Democratic Unity Roundtable (MUD) won the majority of seats.

A week after the 2015 parliamentary elections, the outgoing National Assembly created the "National Communal Parliament", with President Maduro stating "All power to the Communal parliament". The move was described by Janes Information Services as an attempt "to sideline and leapfrog the incoming opposition-controlled National Assembly". The process to hold a Venezuelan recall referendum to vote on recalling Maduro started on 2 May 2016. In July 2016, the Venezuelan government stated that if enough signatures were collected in the second petition stage, a recall vote would be held no sooner than 2017. However, the government cancelled the recall movement on 21 October 2017, with conventional media describing President Maduro as a dictator following the suspension of movement.

After Venezuela entered into a constitutional crisis when the Supreme Tribunal removed power from the National Assembly, months of protests occurred in 2017, resulting in President Maduro calling for the rewriting of the constitution. The 2017 Venezuelan Constituent Assembly election took place, electing all pro-Maduro candidates to the Constituent Assembly of Venezuela, removing power from the National Assembly once again. In December 2020, the Venezuelan Constitutional Assembly was dismantled without presenting a draft for the new constitution.

On July 28, 2024, presidential elections were held for the term of 2025 - 2031, where the incumbent President, Nicolas Maduro, ran against Edmundo González. The result of the election became contested as the government claimed Nicolas Maduro won with 51.90% of the vote. However, international organizations including the Carter center and the United Nations contested this claim as being false and filled with irregularities. On the other hand, the opposition published the detailed electoral results in the form of scanned copies of the tally sheets on the website resultadospresidencialesvenezuela2024.com The opposition was able to obtain 83.50% of the reported tallies, showing that the candidate Edmundo González Urrutia won with 67.08% of the votes.

== Voting system ==
=== Electoral registration ===
Under the 1999 Constitution of Venezuela, all Venezuelans over the age of 18 have the right to vote (Article 64). Additionally, long-term resident non-nationals over 18 (resident over 10 years) have the right to vote in regional and local elections (Article 64). Article 56 specifies that everyone has "the right to be registered free of charge with the Civil Registry Office after birth, and to obtain public documents constituting evidence of their biological identity, in accordance with the law."

According to the National Electoral Council, the proportion of the voting-age population on the Electoral Register has risen from 80% in 1998 to 95% in 2011, with 19m (including nearly 100,000 voters outside Venezuela) registered in 2012 compared with 12m in 2003. Voters register fingerprints and identity card details onto the Electoral Register, and these are to be verified during the voting process.

=== Electoral system ===
Venezuela elects at a national level the President of Venezuela as head of state and head of government, and a unicameral federal legislature. The President is elected for a six-year term by direct election plurality voting, and is (since the 2009 Venezuelan constitutional referendum) eligible for re-election. The National Assembly (Asamblea Nacional) has 165 members (diputados), elected for five-year terms (see #Parliamentary voting system below).

== Party system ==
=== Background ===
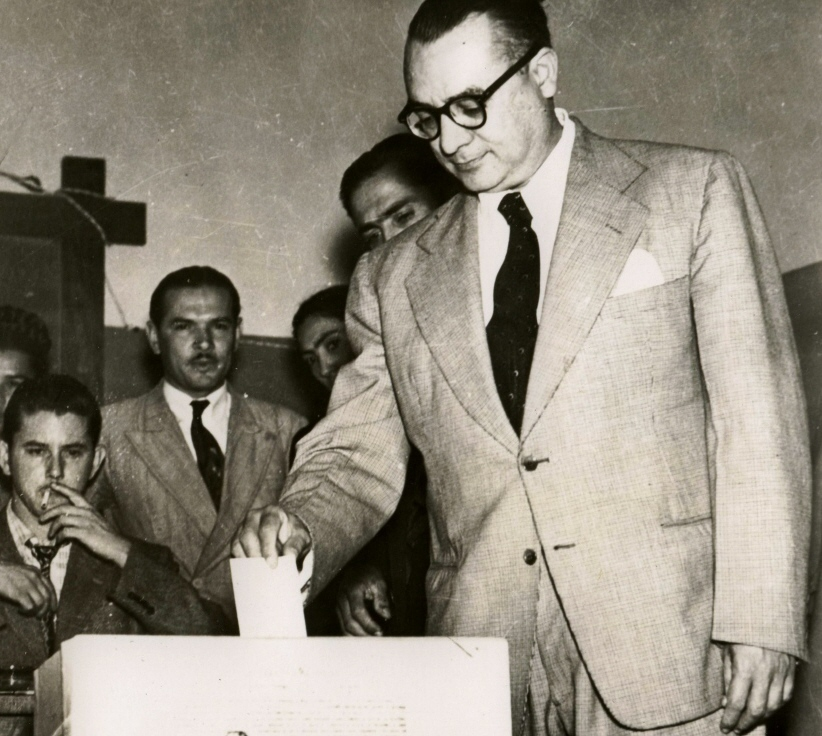
Rómulo Betancourt voting in the 1946 elections

Democracy in Venezuela developed during the twentieth century, with Democratic Action (founded in 1941) and its antecedents playing an important role in the early years. Democratic Action led the government during Venezuela's first democratic period (1945–1948). After an intervening decade of dictatorship (1948–1958) saw AD excluded from power, four Venezuelan presidents came from Democratic Action from the 1960s to the 1990s. This period, incorrectly called the "Fourth Republic" by Hugo Chavez and his followers, is marked by the development of the Punto Fijo Pact between the major parties (originally including the Democratic Republican Union, which later dwindled in significance), with the notable exclusion of the Communist Party of Venezuela. By the end of the 1990s, however, the now two-party system's credibility was almost nonexistent, mostly because of the corruption and poverty that Venezuelans experienced because of the debt crisis developed during the 1980s. Democratic Action's last president (Carlos Andrés Pérez) was impeached for corruption in 1993, and spent several years in prison as a result. The other main traditional party Copei, provided two Venezuelan presidents (Rafael Caldera, 1969–1974, and Luis Herrera Campins, 1979–1983).

=== Current ===
Confidence in the traditional parties collapsed enough that the 1993 presidential elections were won by Rafael Caldera on around 30% of the vote, representing a new electoral coalition, National Convergence. By 1998, support for Democratic Action and COPEI had fallen still further, and the 1998 election was won by political outsider Hugo Chávez.

Since then, a range of newer parties (such as A New Era and Justice First) have been more prominent in opposition to Chávez than the traditional main parties Democratic Action and COPEI. The United Socialist Party of Venezuela (Partido Socialista Unido de Venezuela, PSUV) was created in 2007, uniting a number of smaller parties supporting Chávez' Bolivarian Revolution with Chávez' Fifth Republic Movement. It is the lead party of the Great Patriotic Pole coalition. The Democratic Unity Roundtable (Mesa de la Unidad Democrática, MUD), created in 2008, unites much of the opposition. Hugo Chávez, the central figure of the Venezuelan political landscape since 1998, died in office in early 2013, and was succeeded by Nicolás Maduro (initially as interim President, before narrowly winning the 2013 Venezuelan presidential election).

== Polling procedure ==
Since 1998 elections in Venezuela have become more automated, and administered by the National Electoral Council, with poll workers drafted via a lottery of registered voters. Polling places are equipped with multiple touch-screen DRE voting machines, one per "mesa electoral", or voting "table". After the vote is cast, each machine prints out a paper ballot, or VVPAT, which is inspected by the voter and deposited in a ballot box belonging to the machine's table. The voting machines perform in a stand-alone fashion, disconnected from any network until the polls close. Voting session closure at each of the voting stations in a given polling center is determined either by the lack of further voters after the lines have emptied, or by the hour, at the discretion of the president of the voting table.

Voters register fingerprints and identity card details onto the Electoral Register, and these are verified during the voting process. Voters sign a register to confirm that they have voted, and have a finger marked with election ink.

In March 2018, Smartmatic, the British electoral products company (now SGO Corporation) which had participated in the majority of elections under the Bolivarian government, ceased operations in Venezuela, stating that they could no longer guarantee the validity of election results through its machines.

=== Tally scrutinization ===
After the polls close at any voting table, the following steps are carried out:

- The DRE voting machine is ordered to close the voting session.
- Tally scrutinization announced.
- Each voting machine prints an original tally sheet, each has a voter total and the number of votes cast for each candidate cast in that particular machine/table.
- Each voting machine is connected to the network and the results are sent to the vote counting center.
- Nine extra tally sheets are printed and distributed to the staff and the six representatives of the candidates that received the most votes.
- With the original tally sheet in hand the total number of votes cast is compared to the signed up sheet or electoral notebook. Finally, for those machines chosen for the audit (see below) the electoral ballots, or paper trails, are counted one by one to determine if they add up to the totals in the tally sheet. Any anomaly is mentioned in the tally sheet report, signed by the staff and auditors, and then sealed and given to the military for delivery to the CNE.

=== Random paper ballot audit ===
Once the tally scrutinization is complete the staff proceeds to perform a random paper ballot audit of 54.31% of the machines. Each voting center can have anywhere from one to twelve voting machines, occasionally up to fifteen. The staff randomly selects the tables/machines by drawing a number out of a paper hat. The size of the draw is dependent on the number of tables/machines.

The following procedures occur step by step:

- Polls are closed
- Tally scrutinization finishes
- Random paper ballot audit announced
- The machines are randomly selected drawing numbers out of a paper hat
- The machine's serial number is recorded
- The corresponding paper ballot box is selected and opened
- The paper ballots results for each candidate are openly counted
- With the original tally printed from the electronic results, both results are audited
- Any anomaly (even if by one vote) is recorded in the audit report
- The original audit report is signed by staff and observers, officially sealed and handed to the military for delivery to the CNE
- Copies are handed over to the representatives of the two highest vote getters.

== Parliamentary elections ==
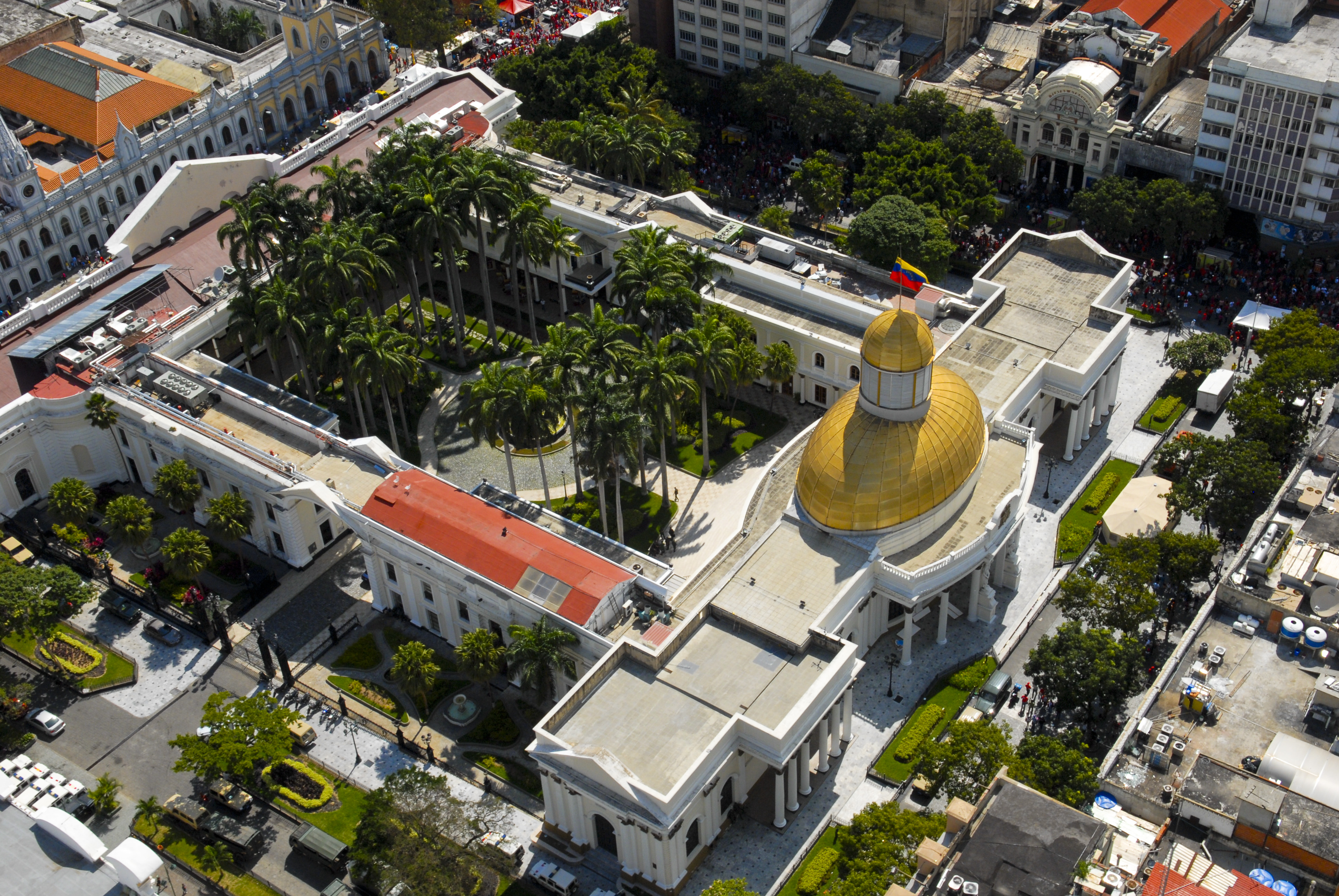
National Assembly of Venezuela

=== Parliamentary voting system ===
Elections for the National Assembly of Venezuela in the 2000 and the 2005 were conducted under a weak mixed member proportional system, with 60% elected in first-past-the-post voting districts and the remainder by closed party list proportional representation. This was an adaptation of the system previously used for the Venezuelan Chamber of Deputies, which had been introduced in 1993, with a 50–50 balance between voting districts and party lists, and deputies per state proportional to population, but with a minimum of three deputies per state.

For the 2010 election, the Ley Orgánica de Procesos Electorales (LOPE) (Basic Law of Electoral Process) among other changes reduced the party list proportion to 30%. In addition, the law completely separated the district vote and the party list votes, creating a parallel voting system. Previously, parties winning nominal district seats had had these subtracted from the total won under the proportional party list. Under the new law, in 2009, electoral districts were redefined in a way that has been accused of favouring the PSUV, particularly in giving more weight to votes in the countryside over those in the city.

== Presidential elections ==
There are regular presidential elections in Venezuela. The president of Venezuela is elected for a six-year term by direct election plurality voting, and is eligible for unlimited re-election. One of the first "honest" presidential elections in Venezuela was held in 1947, with Rómulo Gallegos of Democratic Action receiving 74.3% of the vote. The next elections were held in 1958 and won by Rómulo Betancourt of Democratic Action, who received 49.2% of the vote. With voter turnout reported to be 92.3%, in the 1963 presidential elections Raúl Leoni of Democratic Action won with 32.8% of the vote. In the subsequent 1968 elections, Rafael Caldera of Copei (the Social Christian Party of Venezuela) won with 29.1% of the vote, although Democratic Action remained the largest party in the Chamber of Deputies and Senate. The following elections the presidential seat returned to Democratic Action, with Carlos Andrés Pérez receiving 48.7% of the vote in a voter turnout of 96.5%.

The 1978 elections were won by Luis Herrera Campins of Copei with 46.6% of the vote. Jaime Lusinchi of Democratic Action won with 58.4% of the vote in 1983, with voter turnout at 87.3%. Carlos Andrés Pérez won a second time in 1988 with 52.9% of the vote, and a voter turnout of 81.9% in the presidential election. Former president Rafael Caldera, newly associated with National Convergence, won with 30.5% of the vote in 1993. The voter turnout in 1993 was 60.2%, the lowest since World War II. After being imprisoned for an attempted coup and then pardoned by Caldera, Hugo Chávez founded the Fifth Republic Movement and was elected president of Venezuela in 1998. He was re-elected in 2000.

A recall referendum in 2004 was voted on by the populace to determine whether Chávez should be recalled from office, resulting in no recall (58% no). The authenticity of the results became a point of contention.

Chavez was reelected in 2006 with over 60% of the votes, and in 2009 a constitutional referendum resulted in the abolishment of term limits for the offices of President of Venezuela. Since 1999 there had been a two-term limit. Chavez was reelected for a third term in the October 2012 presidential election. Nicolas Maduro won the 2013 presidential election and was reelected in 2018.

== Regional and local elections ==
Venezuela is a federal state; Venezuelan states have governors, which have been elected since 1989 (previously they were appointed by the President). Regional and local elections were introduced following the work in the 1980s of the Commission for the Reform of the State (Comisión para la Reforma del Estado, COPRE). .

== Latest elections ==
Most recent elections:

- parliamentary: 2025 Venezuelan parliamentary election
- regional: 2021 Venezuelan regional elections
- presidential: 2024 Venezuelan presidential election
- constituent assembly: 2017 Venezuelan Constituent Assembly election

== See also ==
- Politics of Venezuela
- Electoral calendar
- List of political parties in Venezuela
