= Democracy in Venezuela =

Democracy in Venezuela, characterized by direct elections, prevailed until the 2010s, with doubts and criticism beginning in mid-2000s. From 1958, Venezuela was considered a relatively stable democracy compared to other countries in Latin America, which were governed by military dictatorship. By 1977, Venezuela was only one of three democracies in Latin America, along with Colombia and Costa Rica. In 2008, it was ranked the least democratic nation in South America in The Economist Democracy Index, and by 2022 it ranked 147th out of 167 countries, with a rating of an authoritarian regime.

== Background ==
José Antonio Páez was the first to win, elected by the National Congress in indirect elections in 1831. José María Vargas was the first civilian elected in 1835, also under indirect elections. Said representative democratic system was interrupted several times by several revolutions until the presidential elections of 1860, where, in the context of the Federal War, Venezuelan men directly elected a president for the first time in history, the writer Manuel Felipe de Tovar.

=== First Republic ===
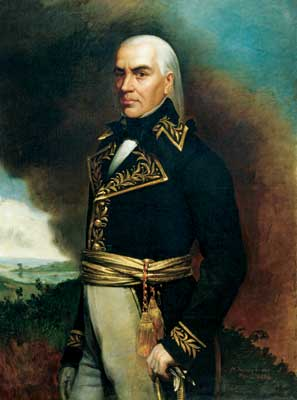
Francisco de Miranda, founder of the First Republic of Venezuela

According to Reyes Matheus, Francisco de Miranda’s conception of democracy was based on three principles: equality of rights, order, and good laws.

In 1811 a constituent assembly was convened to reform the State. Historian Alejandra Martínez Cánchica notes that Venezuelan republicans, wary of absolutism, introduced limits to the executive in the Federal Constitution of 1811, creating a rotating triumvirate. However, internal divisions and the adoption of federalism weakened the Republic, contributing to the fall of Puerto Cabello, capitulation, and the imprisonment of Miranda.

=== Second and Third Republics ===
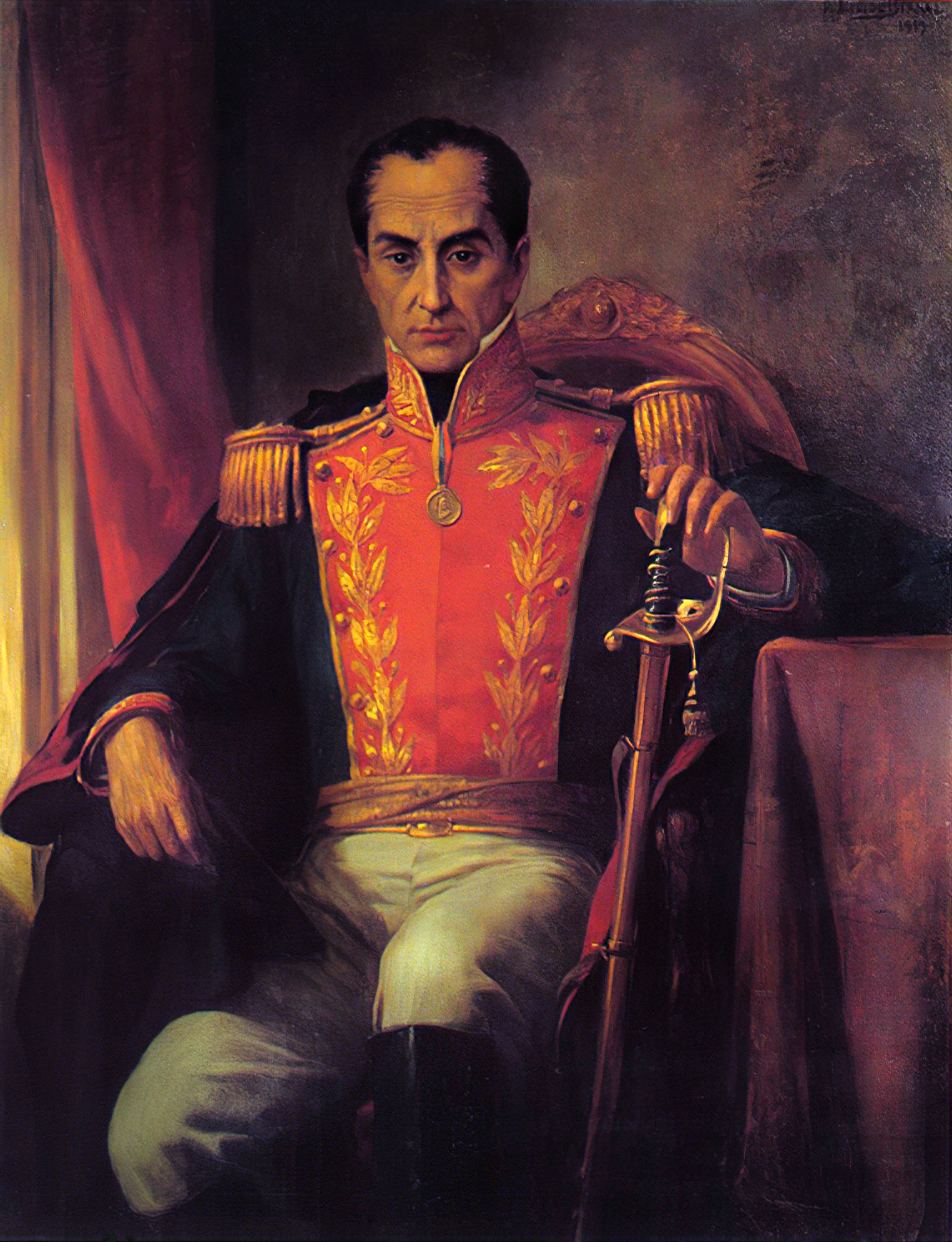
Simón Bolívar founded Gran Colombia under democratic principles.

Simón Bolívar argued that “only democracy is capable of absolute freedom.” He briefly assumed dictatorial powers during the Second Republic of Venezuela (1813–1814). In the Jamaica Letter (1815), Bolívar envisioned “...a government like the English one, with the difference that, instead of a king, it will have an elective and lifelong executive, and a hereditary senate.”

=== Gran Colombia ===
With the Third Republic established, Bolívar led the union with New Granada under the 1821 Constitution, forming Gran Colombia. Bolívar became president and Francisco de Paula Santander vice president, both elected for four-year terms with the possibility of non-consecutive reelection. The provinces of Panama, Quito, and Guayaquil later joined the federation.

In 1828 the Ocaña Convention sought constitutional reform, but when Santander gained a majority Bolívar withdrew his delegates, leaving Congress without quorum. He then staged a self-coup, declared himself “Liberator President,” and removed Santander from office. Bolívar's dictatorship lasted until 1830, when he was exiled and resigned shortly thereafter. That same year, another constituent assembly in Venezuela carried out a deep reform of the State.

== History ==
=== 19th century ===
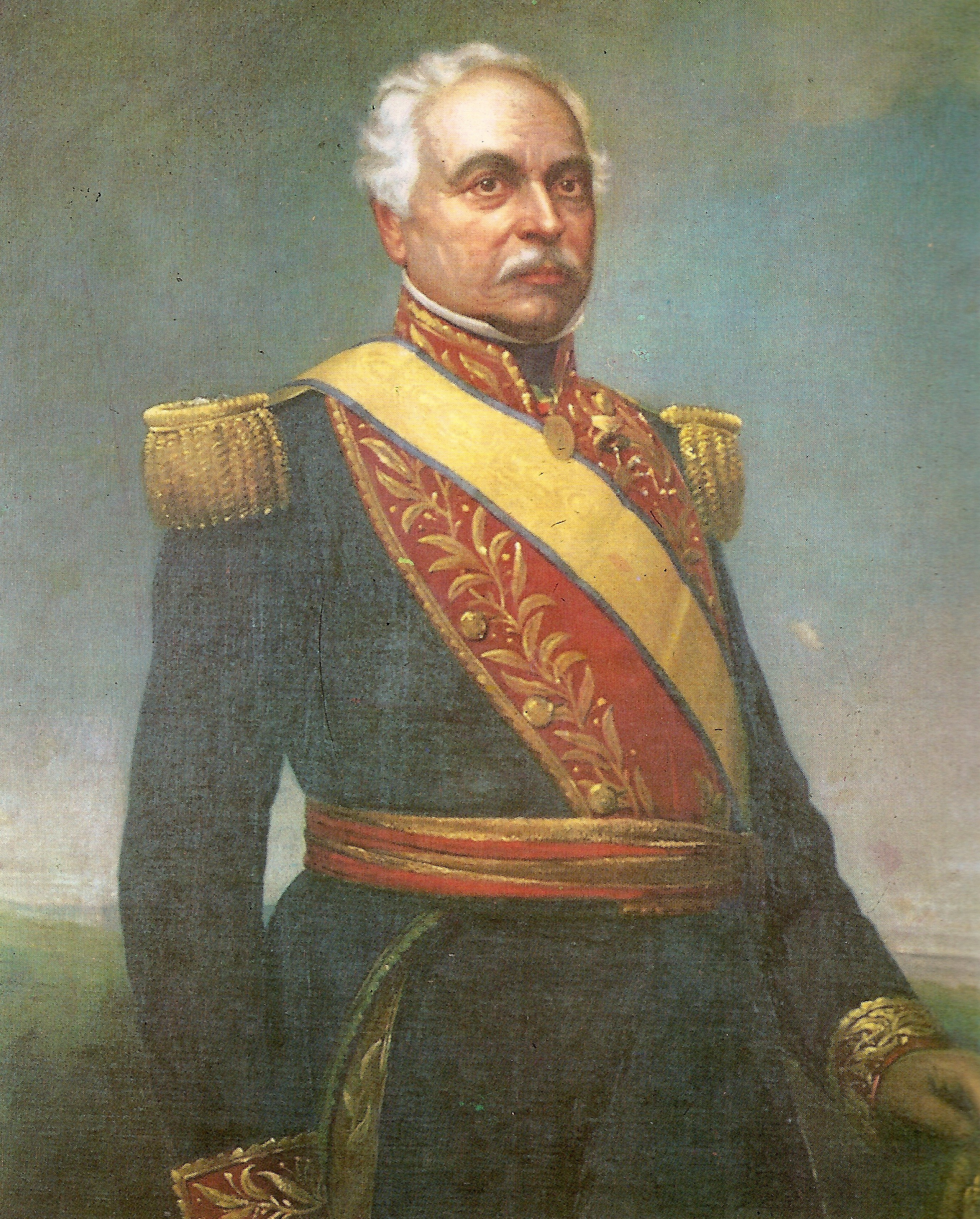
José Antonio Páez was the first president of the current Republic of Venezuela, elected by indirect vote in 1831.

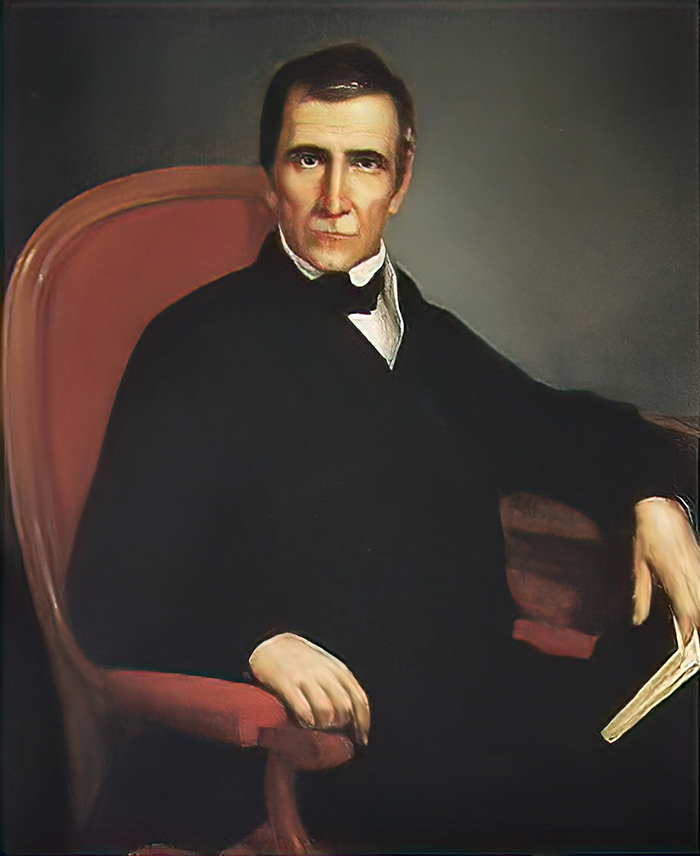
José María Vargas was the first civilian to be elected president.

According to historian Tomás Straka, voting took place continuously from the start of the republic. After the separation of Venezuela from Gran Colombia, the Bolívarian nation-building project, José Antonio Páez became the first to win a presidential election, appointed by the National Congress under indirect election in 1831. José María Vargas became the first civilian elected president, also by indirect election, in 1835.

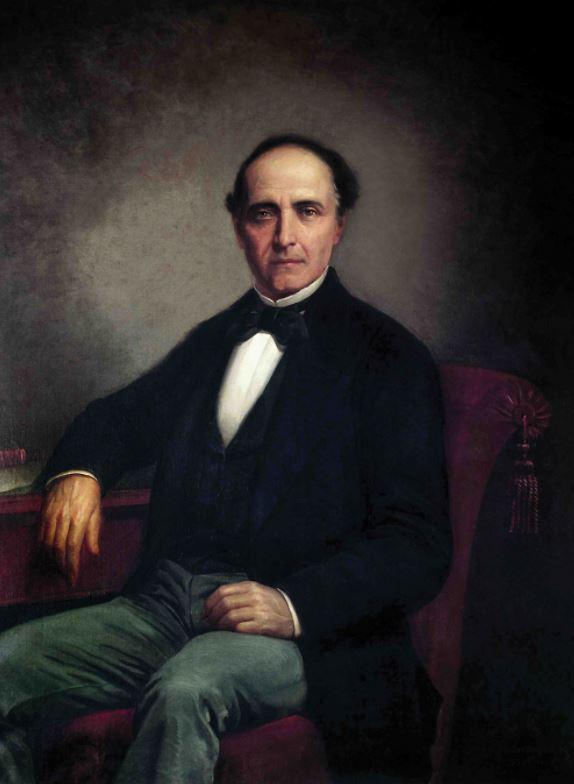
Manuel Felipe de Tovar was the first president elected by direct vote in 1860, during the Federal War.

This first representative democratic system was interrupted several times by revolutions, until the 1860 presidential elections, when, during the Federal War, Venezuelan men directly elected a president for the first time: the writer Manuel Felipe de Tovar. Tovar resigned, and Pedro Gual became interim president in 1861. That same year Páez returned to power after a coup d’état, but was defeated in 1863.

A National Constituent Assembly was convened in 1864 after the war, and another in 1892. The last free elections of the 19th century were held in 1894.

The dominant parties during the century were the Conservative Party (aligned with Páez) and the Liberal Party (aligned with Guzmán Blanco). Both exercised power under democratic and dictatorial governments at different times and clashed during the Federal War (1859–1863), which the Liberals won.

=== 20th century ===
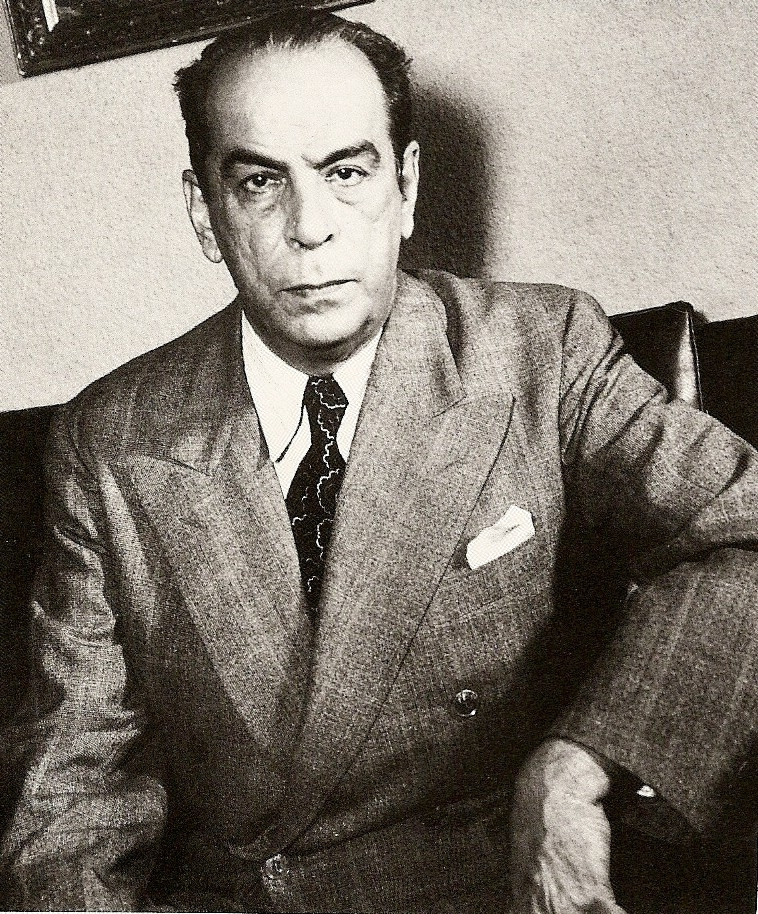
Rómulo Gallegos was the first president elected by direct vote in the history of Venezuela since 1860.

After the death of Juan Vicente Gómez and the end of his military dictatorship, a process of transition to democracy began with the political opening of Eleazar López Contreras and Isaías Medina Angarita. Isaías Medina legalised political parties in 1941, with Democratic Action being the first to be founded. Reluctance to install direct voting for presidential elections ended in the 1945 coup d'état led by Carlos Delgado Chalbaud and Marcos Pérez Jiménez and supported by Democratic Action.

The transitional government of Rómulo Betancourt made the necessary reforms for the first free and direct elections in history, the 1947 general election, which resulted in the election of the writer Rómulo Gallegos as president. The period was known as the Trienio Adeco (Adeco Triennium) and was only partially democratic, as some parties were disqualified. The period was finally interrupted by the 1948 coup d'état.

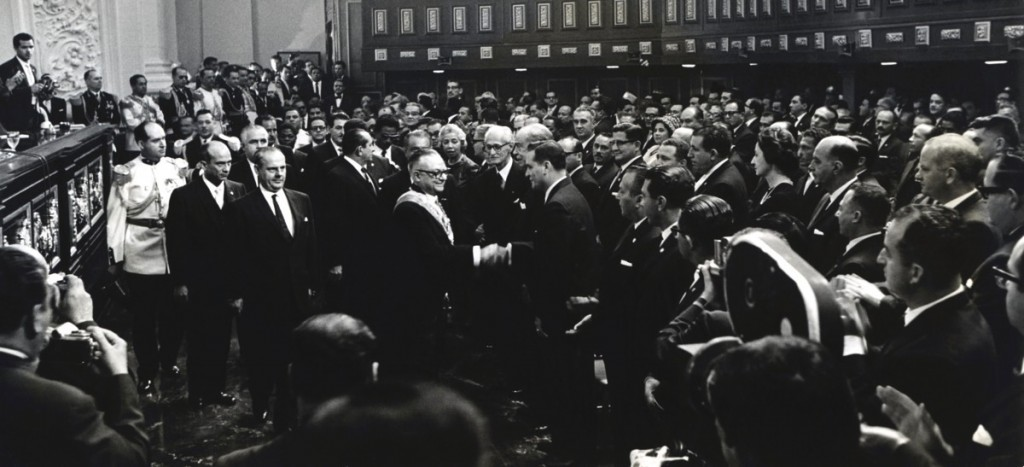
Rómulo Betancourt was the first directly elected president to complete his term in office in 1964.

The second presidency of Rómulo Betancourt was the beginning of the democratic history with political parties banned since 1962, including the Communist Party of Venezuela (PCV). Rafael Caldera's first presidency saw the implementation of a policy of incorporating participants in the country's subversive movements that emerged during the 1960s to lay down their arms, a trend begun by the government of Raúl Leoni.

From 1958 onward, Venezuela was considered to be a relatively stable democracy within a continent that was facing a wave of military dictatorship, consuming almost all Latin American countries in the 1970s. By 1977, Venezuela was, along with Colombia and Costa Rica, one of only three democracies in Latin America. Until the early 1980s, it was one of Latin America's four most prosperous states; with an upper-middle economy, and a stable centre-left democracy. The collapse of the oil market in the 1980s left Venezuela (a major crude oil exporter) in great debt.

Democracy was put to the test when socio-economic deterioration and political discontent in some quarters were reflected in two coup attempts in the 1990s.

Two leaders were tried and imprisoned in democracy during the rest of the 20th century: Marcos Pérez Jiménez in 1963 (more than four years) and Carlos Andrés Pérez in 1993 (more than two years).

The February 1992 Venezuelan coup attempt was led by Hugo Chávez, who was later elected in 1998 Venezuelan presidential election by appealing on the desires of the poor and pledging economic reforms, and, once in office, securing his power by creating an authoritarian regime, following a relatively stable pattern between 1999 and 2003. Chávez started rewriting the constitution swiftly after arriving in-office. After enabling himself to legally rewrite the constitution and therewith amending a presidential term from five to six years, with a single reelection, Chávez gained full control over the military branch. This allowed him to determine military promotions and eliminate the Senate. As a result, he no longer required legislative approval. The weakening of political institutions and increased government corruption transformed Venezuela into a personal dictatorship.

Chavez's dominance of the media (including a constant presence on television) and his charismatic personality contributed to democratic backsliding in Venezuela, in addition to constitutional revisions that concentrated Chávez's power and diminished the executive's accountability.

=== 21st century ===
In 2002, the military asked Hugo Chávez to resign, arrested him, and took him to Fuerte Tiuna during the 2002 Venezuelan coup d'état attempt, in which Pedro Carmona assumed power and issued the Acta de Constitución del Gobierno de Transición Democrática y Unidad Nacional, dissolving the national branches of government and concentrating all power in himself. The measure was described as “dictatorial” by the Latin American Council of Social Sciences. Chávez was restored to office shortly afterward by the National Assembly led by Diosdado Cabello. The Economist Democracy Index, Venezuela ranked 147th out of 167 countries, with a rating of an authoritarian regime.

In 2005, the main opposition parties boycotted that year's legislative elections, leaving Chávez and the ruling party in control of the National Assembly until 2010. In 2008, Venezuela was ranked the least democratic nation in South America in The Economist Democracy Index. The same year, Freedom House removed Venezuela from its list of countries with representative democracy.

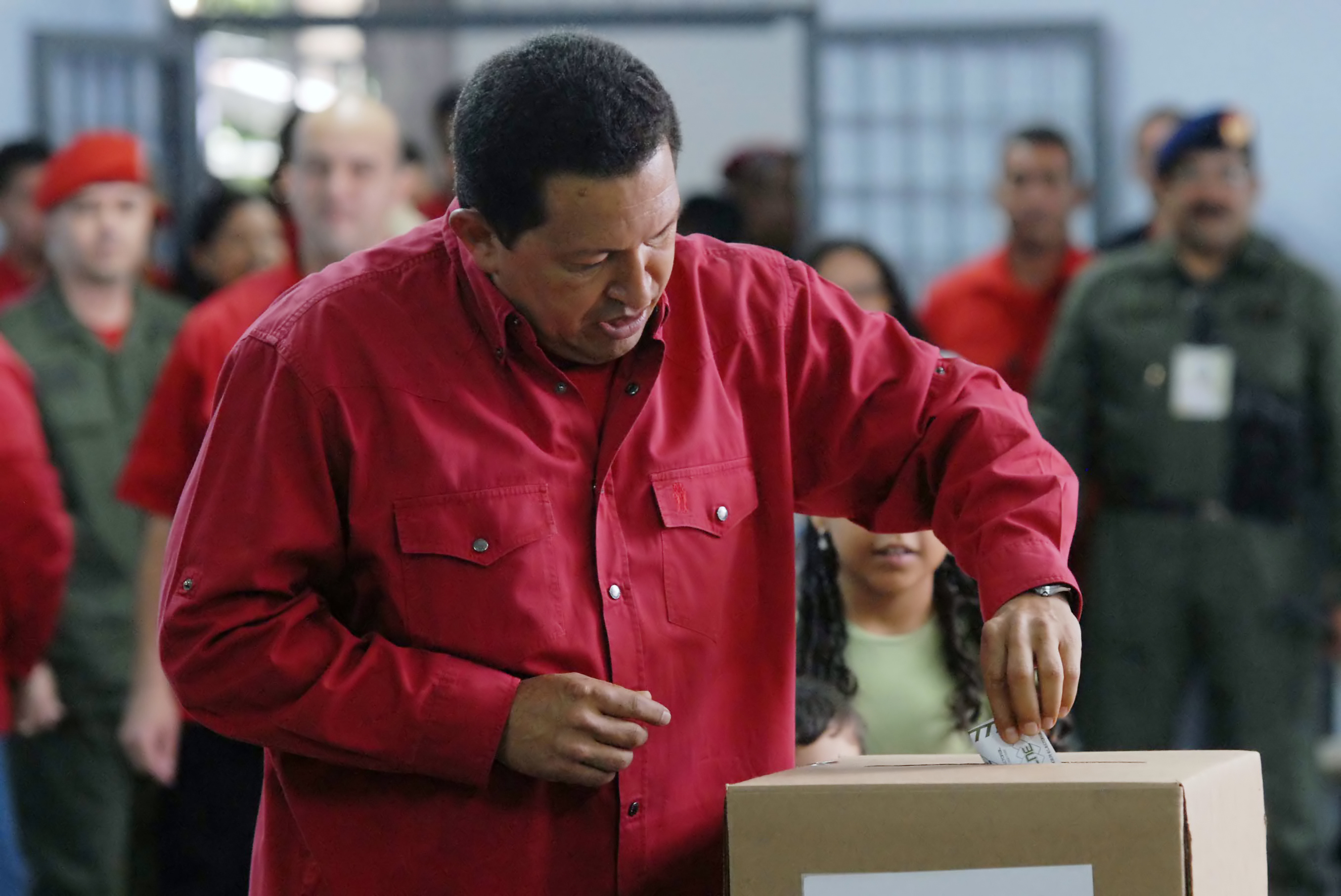
President Hugo Chávez voting in 2007. His government has been described as a hybrid regime.

Venezuela's Democracy Index in 2011, classified as a hybrid regime

In 2013, Nicolás Maduro, Chávez's vice president, was elected as the candidate of the United Socialist Party of Venezuela (PSUV) by a narrow margin. Opposition candidate Henrique Capriles denounced electoral fraud and demanded audits in the 2013 Venezuelan presidential election.

In 2015, Tamara Adrián was elected deputy for the Democratic Unity Roundtable, becoming the first transgender person in the Americas to hold such a position, beginning in 2016. In the same elections, Rosmit Mantilla became the first openly gay politician elected to the National Assembly, as an alternate deputy. Mantilla was elected while imprisoned for his participation in the 2014 Venezuelan protests, and was released in 2016, along with deputies Renzo Prieto and Gilberto Sojo.

In January 2017, the National Assembly declared Maduro in “abandonment of office”, a legal mechanism that would have required new elections within thirty days. In March, the Supreme Tribunal of Justice issued ruling 156, which was denounced as a “coup d'état” by Assembly president Julio Borges and as a “rupture of the constitutional order” by attorney general Luisa Ortega Díaz, and described as an assumption of legislative powers by former Supreme Court president Cecilia Sosa. Later that year, the Constituent Assembly, boycotted by the opposition as fraudulent, approved Decree 6323. Both measures curtailed the powers of the popularly elected National Assembly in favor of the Supreme Tribunal (briefly) and the Constituent Assembly (until 2020, when new legislative elections were held).

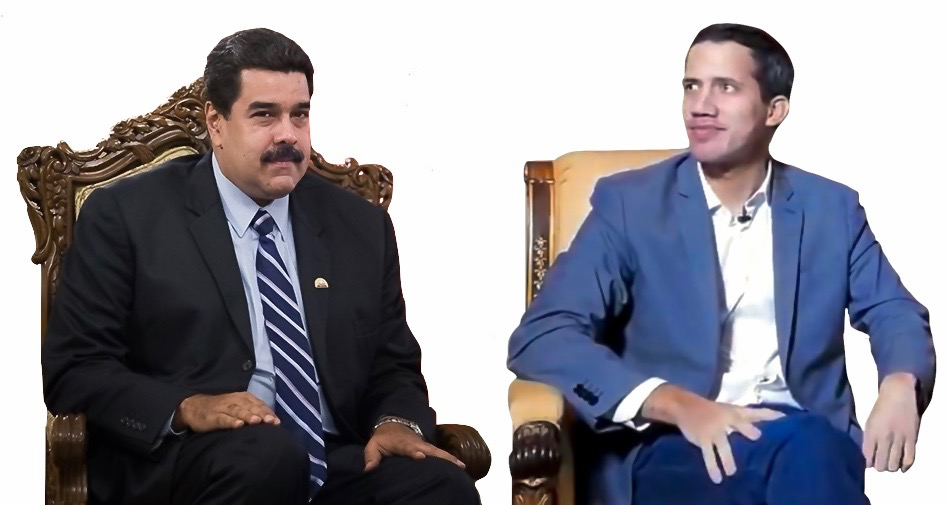
Nicolás Maduro and Juan Guaidó (AN president) disputed the presidency after the Assembly's 2017 attempt to declare Maduro removed from office.

During the 21st century, several states elected female governors for the first time: Delta Amacuro and Monagas (Yelitza Santaella, 2000 and 2017), Portuguesa (Antonia Muñoz, 2000), Falcón (Stella Lugo, 2008), Cojedes (Erika Farías, 2012), Lara (Carmen Meléndez, 2017), and Táchira (Laidy Gómez, 2017).

Amid the institutional crisis that began the year before, the opposition boycotted the 2018 Venezuelan presidential election, except for candidate Henri Falcón. Nicolás Maduro was re-elected amid 68% abstention. The opposition repeated the boycott in the 2020 Venezuelan parliamentary election, which resulted in the PSUV regaining control of the National Assembly with 31% of registered voters participating.

In 2021, the CNE annulled the gubernatorial election in Barinas after opposition candidate Freddy Superlano won by a margin of 1%, calling new elections in which Superlano was disqualified.

By 2023, under Maduro, 1,441 individuals were barred from holding office, including opposition leaders Henrique Capriles, Leopoldo López, and María Corina Machado. After the 2023 Democratic Unitary Platform primaries, which elected Machado as candidate, she was disqualified and appointed historian Corina Yoris as her substitute for the 2024 Venezuelan presidential election, but Yoris was unable to register her candidacy on the CNE website. The opposition led by Machado denounced electoral fraud after CNE results declared Maduro the winner over Edmundo González.

== See also ==
- Censorship in Venezuela
- Democracy in Mexico
- Chilean transition to democracy
- Spanish transition to democracy
