= Revolutionary Party of the Proletariat (Communist) =

The Revolutionary Party of the Proletariat (Communist) (Spanish: Partido Revolucionario del Proletariado (Comunista), abbreviated P.R.P.(C)), nick-named 'the Black Communists', was a political party in Venezuela 1947-1952.

PRP(C) was formed in late 1947 by a dissident group of erstwhile United Venezuelan Communist Party (PCVU) leaders, including by Salvador de la Plaza, Luis Miquilena, Horacio Scott Power and Rodolfo Quintero, who had opposed the reconciliation of PCVU with the Communist Party of Venezuela (PCV) at the November 1946 Unity Congress. The 'Miquilena-Scott-Quintero group' had its base in the Federación Sindical de Caracas ('Caracas Trade Union Federation') and had Frente Obrero ('Workers Front') as its organ. Salvador de la Plaza, who edited El Comunista ('The Communist'), was the main theoretician of the group. The group founded the PRP(C) in order to contest the 1947 Venezuelan general election. The party was legalized in October 1947. It was subsequently formally constituted on November 7, 1947 (the 30th anniversary of the October Revolution).

In contrast to the PCV, the PRP(C) rejected the notion of building alliances with the 'progressive bourgeoisie' for a 'national bourgeois revolution'. The PRP(C) rejected working with the Democratic Action-led CTV trade unions. Instead PRP(C) maintained its own trade union organizations, the most prominent being the bus drivers' union in Caracas and the petrol workers of Puerto de la Cruz and San Joaquín.

Political parties were assigned coloured ballots ahead of the 1947 Venezuelan general election and the PRP(C) was assigned the colour black. Subsequently the PRP(C) became nick-named 'the Black Communists' in contrast to the 'Red Communists' of the PCV (whose ballot papers were red). It was not allowed to field a presidential candidate as it had been legalized posterior to the Constituent Assembly. The PRP(C) obtained 7,068 votes (0.59%) in the 1947 parliamentary election. In the Federal District, PRP(C) had obtained 1,711 votes (0.96%). The party obtained 3,697 votes (0.53%) in the May 1948 municipal elections, but only managed to win a few seats in Anzoátegui state.

At the time of the 1948 Venezuelan coup d'état the PRP(C) argued that the ousted government of Rómulo Gallegos had been a puppet of U.S. imperialism, and declined to the defend it. Whilst the military regimes suppressed the PCV, the PRP(C) could work more openly. Its trade union federations in the Federal District and Anzoátegui were legalized under the military junta regime. However, after its legalization the Federal District trade union federation was split in two groups, one led by Rodolfo Quinteros and one led by Cruz Villegas.

The PRP(C) was disbanded itself in 1952. By this point the party had shrunk and the Communist Party of the Soviet Union had called for unity among the Venezuelan communists. Most of its former membership (including Rodolfo Quintero, Cruz Villegas and other leaders) joined PCV. However, Some PRP(C) leaders, such as De la Plaza and Miquilena, never rejoined the PCV.
