= Leonardo Ruiz Pineda =

Venezuelan politician

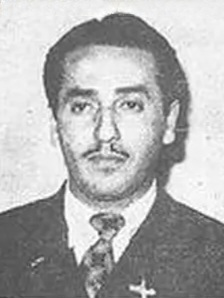
- Leonardo Ruiz Pineda during a visit to Táchira state in 1946

Secretary General of Democratic Action
- In office September 1949 – Unknown
- Preceded by: Octavio Lepage

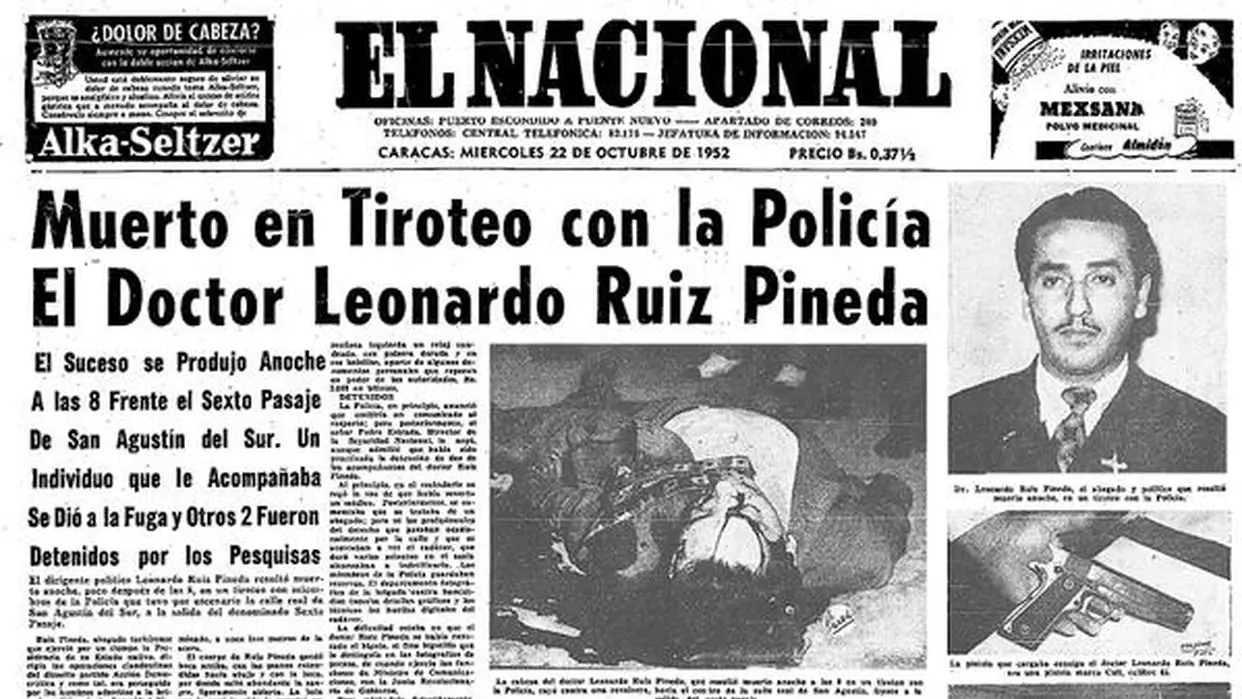
Front page of the newspaper El Nacional reporting on the death of Ruiz Pineda

Leonardo Ruiz Pineda (28 September 1916 – 21 October 1952) was a Venezuelan lawyer and politician, member and one of the founders of the party Acción Democrática (AD), of which was Secretary General and leader of the clandestine resistance between 1949 and 1952 against the dictatorship of Marcos Pérez Jiménez.

== Career ==
Ruiz Pineda was born in Rubio, Táchira, on 28 September 1916. He was appointed Governor of Táchira in 1946 under Romulo Betancourt, and Minister of Communications in February 1948 in the government of Rómulo Gallegos. During the 1948 Venezuelan coup d'état he was arrested, and imprisoned for six months. After his release he became Secretary General of Democratic Action in September 1949, succeeding Octavio Lepage, leading the clandestine resistance movement against the military dictatorship. On 21 October 1952 he was assassinated by police in Caracas.

== See also ==
- History of Venezuela
- Politics of Venezuela
