= Venezuelan Revolution =

Venezuelan Revolution may refer to:

- The Venezuelan War of Independence (1810–1823)
- The Federal War (1859–1863)
- The 1945 Venezuelan coup d'état
- The 1958 Venezuelan coup d'état
- The Bolivarian Revolution (1999–present)
- The 2014–18 Venezuelan protests
