= Canaima (novel) =

1935 novel by Rómulo Gallegos

- Author: Rómulo Gallegos
- Language: Spanish
- Subject: Struggle against nature
- Set in: Orinoco jungle
- Publication date: 1935
- Publication place: Venezuela

Canaima is a Venezuelan novel. It was written by Rómulo Gallegos and published in 1935.

== Plot ==
The Orinoco jungle is the main character and at the same time the reason behind all of the other characters' actions. The struggle against nature and yearning for riches, dominion and power are the main themes in the novel. Canaima represents a bitter struggle against caudillism. Its author depicts the jungle from an ideological standpoint, which translates into his characters' development. Marcos Vargas, returns to Ciudad Bolívar after his studies in Trinidad, finally settling by the waters of Yuruari river.

== Characters ==
- Marcos Vargas: A teenager with an adventurous spirit. After studying in Trinidad, he returns to the Venezuelan jungle to help his mother, who lives in bankruptcy, by starting a cart business. Although he has a noble heart, he's sometimes impulsive, giving into his macho complex. After tainting his hands in blood, unsure in his romantic relationship and his failing business, he decides to abandon everything to go deep into the jungle.
- Manuel Ladera
- Aracelis Vellorini
- Maigualida Ladera
- Gabriel Ureña

== Film ==
A film adaptation of the novel was made in 1945, directed by Juan Bustillo Oro. The cast included Jorge Negrete as Marcos Vargas, Gloria Marín as Magualida, Rosario Granados as Arcelis, Alfredo Varela as Arteguita, Andrés Soler as Giaffaro, Carlos López Moctezuma as José Francisco Ardavín, and Alfonso Bedoya as Cholo Parima.
