= 1946 Venezuelan Constituent Assembly election =

Election

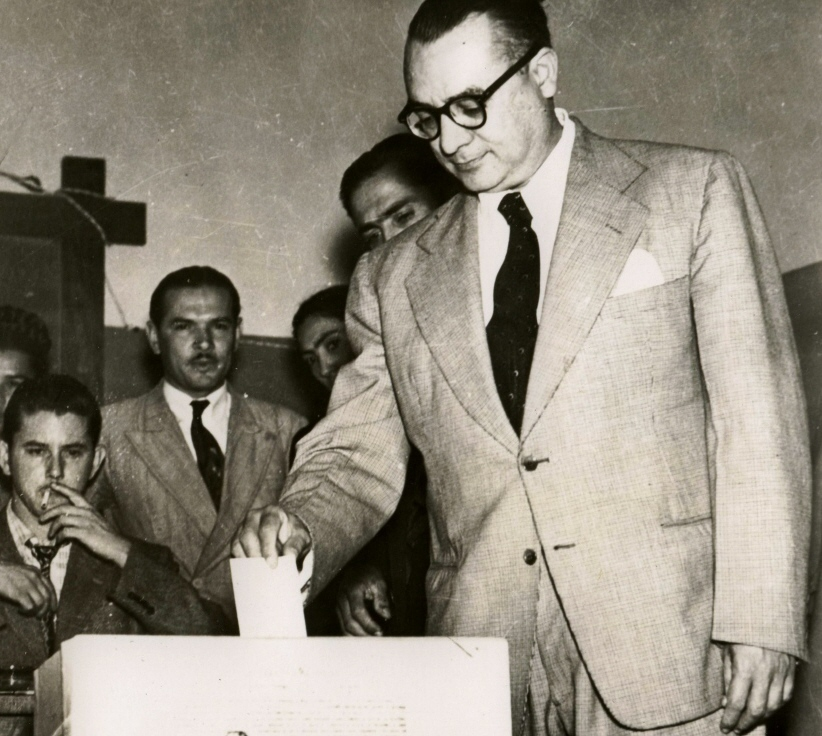
Rómulo Betancourt voting in the 1946 elections

Constituent Assembly elections were held in Venezuela on 27 October 1946, following a coup the year before which launched El Trienio Adeco. They were the first free national elections in the country's history.

Democratic Action, which had led the provisional government formed after the coup, won a decisive victory with 137 of the 160 seats in the Assembly. Voter turnout was 86.6%. The assembly drafted a constitution ahead of the country's first free regular elections a year later.

== Results ==
Party	Votes	%	Seats
Democratic Action	1,099,601	78.43	137
Copei	141,418	10.09	19
Communist Party of Venezuela	50,837	3.63	2
Democratic Republican Union	49,721	3.55	2
Republican Federal Union	38,440	2.74	0
Falconian Electoral Committee	5,489	0.39	0
Liberal Party of Tachira	4,333	0.31	0
Democratic Electoral Organisation	3,007	0.21	0
Socialist Party of Venezuela	2,078	0.15	0
Venezuelan Independent Sector	2,073	0.15	0
Independent Democratic Organisation	1,619	0.12	0
Progressive Liberal Party	846	0.06	0
Other parties	2,549	0.18	0
Total	1,402,011	100.00	160
Valid votes	1,402,011	99.88	
Invalid/blank votes	1,706	0.12	
Total votes	1,403,717	100.00	
Registered voters/turnout	1,621,687	86.56	
Source: Nohlen, Nohlen, Martínez

=== Seats won by state ===
State/ Territory	AD	COPEI/ UFR	PCV	URD
Federal District	12	2	1	
Anzoátegui	6			
Apure	3			
Aragua	6			
Barinas	3			
Bolívar	4			
Carabobo	8			
Cojedes	3			
Falcón	9			
Guárico	6			
Lara	12	1		
Mérida	3	5		
Miranda	9			
Monagas	5			
Nueva Esparta	2			1
Portuguesa	4			
Sucre	11			1
Táchira	3	7		
Trujillo	8	3		
Yaracuy	5			
Zulia	12	1	1	
Amazonas Federal Territory	1			
Delta Amacuro Federal Territory	2			
Source: CSE
