= Progressive Liberal Party (Venezuela) =

The Progressive Liberal Party (Spanish: Partido Liberal Progresista, abbreviated P.L.P.) was a political party in the Amazonas Federal Territory of Venezuela. The party had a loose organization and was set up ahead of the 1947 Venezuelan general elections. The PLP was close to the Democratic Republican Union (URD). PLP won the sole parliamentary seat in the Amazonas Federal Territory in the December 1947 elections, obtaining 860 votes. PLP also won the municipal election held alongside the parliamentary vote, winning 3 out of the 5 seats in the Municipal Council of the Amazonas Federal Territory.
