= 1945 Venezuelan coup d'état =

Coup d'état

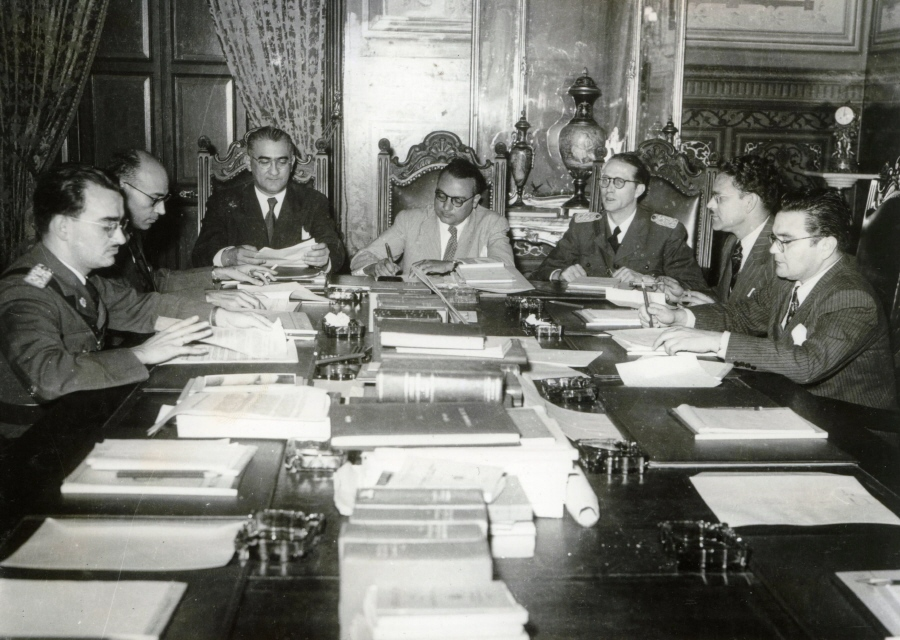
- Members of the Revolutionary Government Junta, from left to right: Mario Ricardo Vargas, Raúl Leoni, Valmore Rodríguez, Rómulo Betancourt, Carlos Delgado Chalbaud, Edmundo Fernández and Gonzalo Barrios. Miraflores Palace, 1945
Date	18 October 1945
Location	Venezuela
Status	Isaías Medina removed from power; Provisional junta led by Romulo Betancourt formed; Start of Trienio Adeco

Belligerents
(Venezuela) Venezuelan opposition	(Venezuela) Venezuelan government

Commanders and leaders
(Venezuela) Rómulo Betancourt (Venezuela) Carlos Delgado Chalbaud (Venezuela) Marcos Pérez Jiménez	(Venezuela) Isaías Medina Angarita

Casualties and losses
- 65 deaths

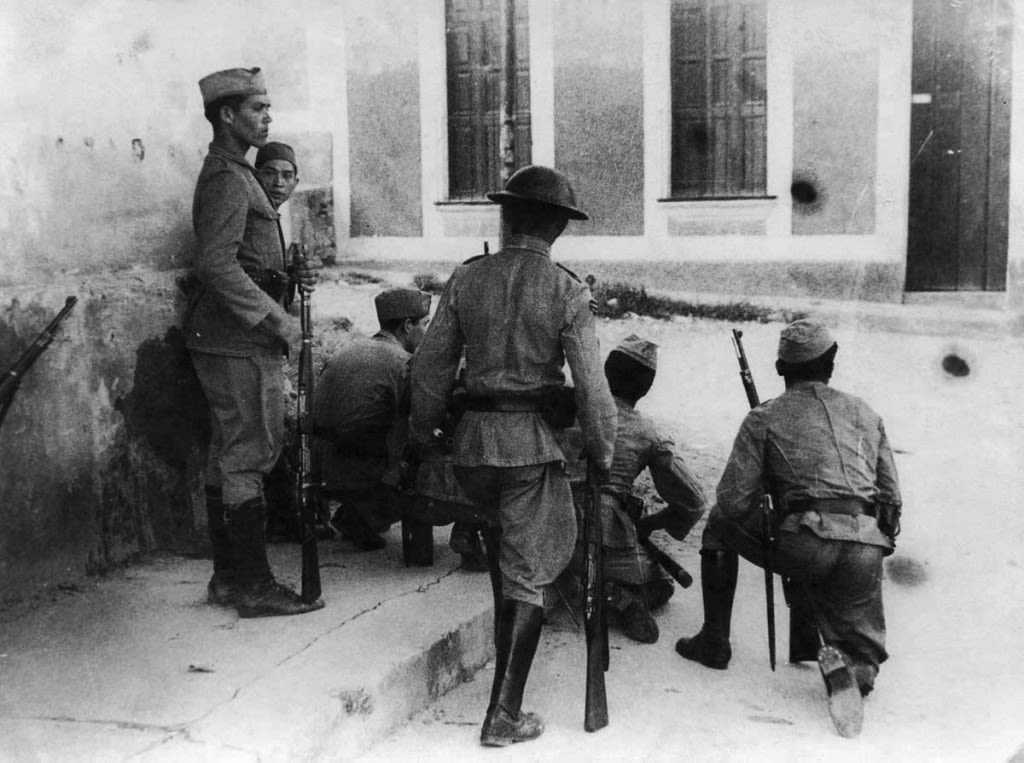
Conflict between government loyalists and opponents during the coup

The 1945 Venezuelan coup d'état took place on 18 October 1945, when the president Isaías Medina Angarita was overthrown by a combination of a military rebellion and a popular movement led by Democratic Action. The Medina government discovered the conspiracy by the military to overthrow Medina and arrested Marcos Pérez Jiménez. The arrest triggered a popular revolt, leading Medina to give up power.

The coup led to a three-year period of government known as El Trienio Adeco, which saw the first participant presidential elections in Venezuelan history, beginning with the 1946 Venezuelan Constituent Assembly election. The 1947 Venezuelan general election saw Democratic Action formally elected to office (with Rómulo Gallegos as president, replacing interim President Rómulo Betancourt), but it was removed from office shortly after in the 1948 Venezuelan coup d'état.

== See also ==
- History of Venezuela (1948–1958)
- Los Notables
