= 1947 Venezuelan general election =

- 14 December 1947
- Presidential election
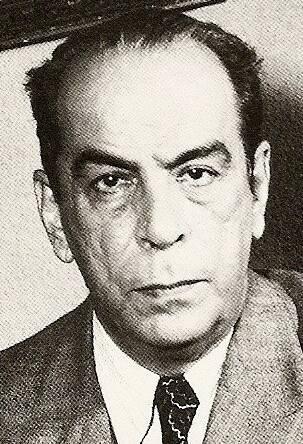

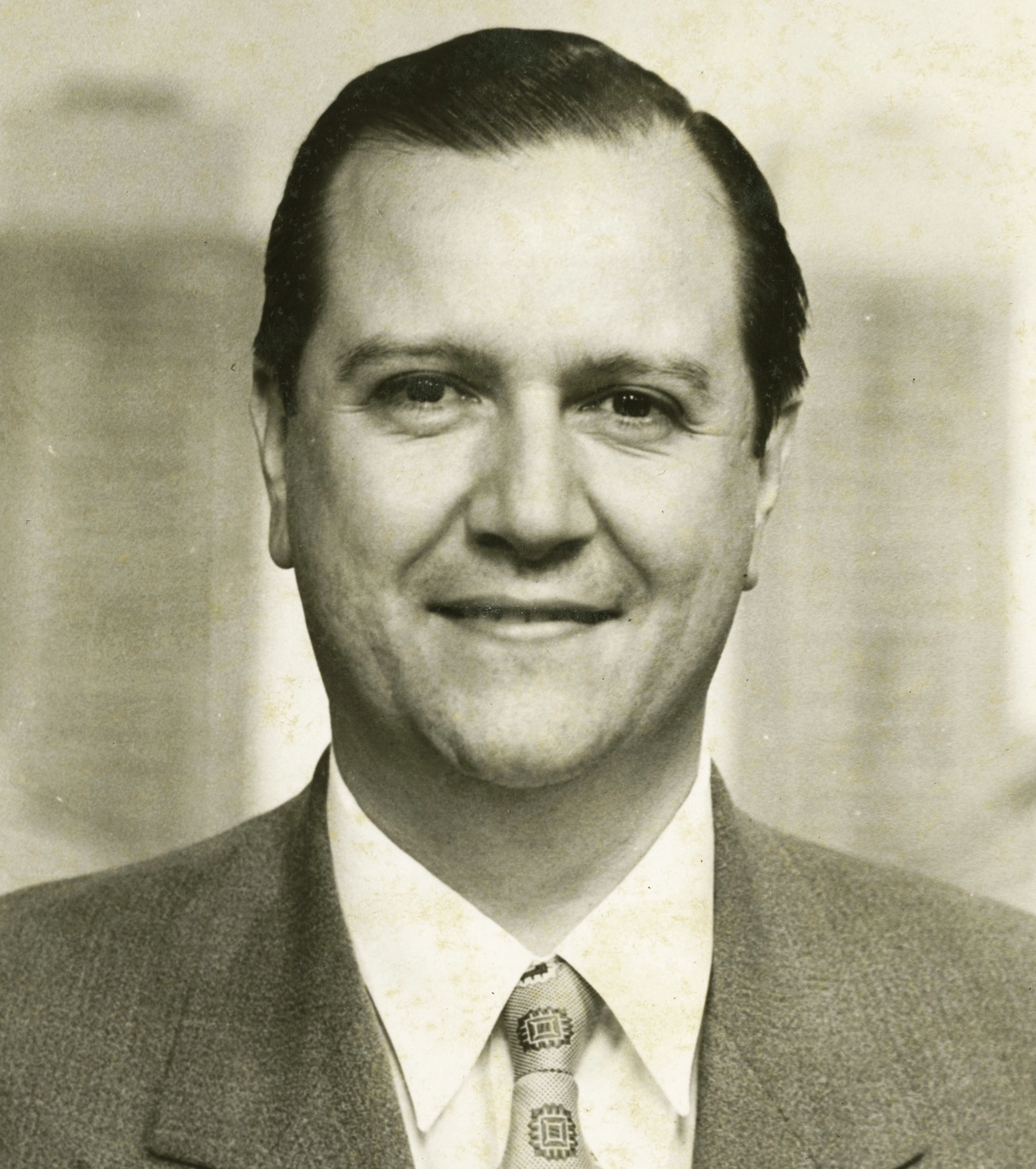
Nominee	Rómulo Gallegos	Rafael Caldera
Party	Democratic Action	Copei
Popular vote	871,752	262,204
Percentage	74.35%	22.36%
President before election
Rómulo Betancourt
Democratic Action
Elected President
Rómulo Gallegos
Democratic Action

General elections were held in Venezuela on 14 December 1947. They resulted in a decisive victory for Democratic Action (AD). The party's presidential candidate, Rómulo Gallegos received 74.3% of the vote, still the largest presidential win in Venezuela's modern history. AD also won supermajorities in both houses of Congress, with 83 of the 110 seats in the Chamber of Deputies and 38 of the 46 seats in the Senate.

These were the first national elections held in Venezuela since the 1945 coup. They were also the first free regular elections since independence in 1830, as well as the first direct elections for president. In previous elections, the Congress of Venezuela had decided and voted on who would assume the presidency.

== Background ==
A new constitution was passed by Congress in 1936, and this restricted voting rights to literate males over the age of 21; over half of Venezuelans could not read. Voting reforms were conducted after the coup in 1945. The eligible voting population rose from 5% to 36% after the right to vote was extended to all citizens over the age of 18 regardless of education, gender, or property.

Democratic Action (AD) was founded in September 1941, after President Isaías Medina Angarita liberalized politics in Venezuela and allowed for the creation of new political organisations.

Diógenes Escalante was meant to be Medina's successor, but he withdrew from politics before the 1945 presidential election after suffering from an illness. Minister of Agriculture Ángel Biaggini replaced Escalante, but he was not supported by AD. AD and members of the military worked together to overthrow Medina on 18 October 1945, and created the El Trienio Adeco. New elections were called for 1946 and 1947 in order to elect people to write a new constitution and elect a new Congress of Venezuela and president.

== Campaign ==
Members of the Unión Nacional Estudiantil (UNE), Acción Electoral, and Acción Nacional formed the Comité de Organización Electoral (CIE) in 1945. On 13 January 1946, CIE was reorganised into Copei. Rafael Caldera initially supported the new government and was made attorney general. However, he resigned on 13 April 1946 after protesting an attempt by the AD to break up a Christian democratic organisation's meeting in Táchira. Copei held its first national convention in September.

The church strongly supported Copei in Táchira and priests told parishioners from the pulpit to vote for the party.

The National Constituent Assembly election to select people to write the constitution was held on 27 October 1946. AD, Copei, Democratic Republican Union (URD), Communist Party of Venezuela (PCV), and Socialist Party (PS) participated in these elections. AD placed first with 78.43% and won in every state except for Táchira and Mérida where Copei won. The assembly was divided between 137 AD members, 19 Copei, 2 URD, and 2 PCV. A new constitution was enacted on 5 July 1947.

== Results ==
=== President ===
Caldera placed first in Táchira and Mérida while Gallegos won every other state. Caldera received a larger percentage of the vote in the presidential race than Copei received in the legislative election. Copei's support rose from 13% in the National Constituent Assembly election to over 20% in the legislative and presidential elections.

Candidate	Party	Votes	%
Rómulo Gallegos	Democratic Action	871,752	74.35
Rafael Caldera	Copei	262,204	22.36
Gustavo Machado Morales	Communist Party of Venezuela	38,587	3.29
Total		1,172,543	100.00
Registered voters/turnout		1,662,000	–
Source: Nohlen

=== Congress ===
In Mérida, the COPEI ran in alliance with the Republican Federal Union. In Tachira the URD ran in alliance with the Liberal Party of Tachira. In the Amazonas Federal Territory the URD ran in alliance with the Progressive Liberal Party.

Party	Votes	%	Seats	
Party	Votes	%	Chamber	Senate
Democratic Action	838,526	70.84	83	38
Copei	200,695	16.95	16	4
Democratic Republican Union	51,427	4.34	4	1
Communist Party of Venezuela	43,190	3.65	3	1
Republican Federal Union	39,491	3.34	3	2
Revolutionary Party of the Proletariat (Communist)	7,068	0.60	0	0
Liberal Party of Tachira	1,300	0.11	0	0
Socialist Party of Venezuela	1,207	0.10	0	0
Progressive Liberal Party	860	0.07	1	0
Total	1,183,764	100.00	110	46
Valid votes	1,183,764	98.74		
Invalid/blank votes	15,105	1.26		
Total votes	1,198,869	100.00		
Registered voters/turnout	1,662,000	72.13		
Source: Nohlen, Bunimov-Parra

==== Chamber seat distribution by state ====
State/ Territory	AD	COPEI /UFR	URD PLP	PCV
Federal District	7	3	1	1
Anzoátegui	4		1	
Apure	2			
Aragua	3	1		
Barinas	2			
Bolívar	2			
Carabobo	5	1		
Cojedes	2			
Falcón	5	1		
Guárico	3			
Lara	7	1		1
Mérida	2	3		
Miranda	6	1		
Monagas	3			
Nueva Esparta	2		1	
Portuguesa	2			
Sucre	7		1	
Táchira	2	4		
Trujillo	5	2		
Yaracuy	3	1		
Zulia	8	1		1
Amazonas Federal Territory			1	
Delta Amacuro Federal Territory	1			
Source: CSE

==== Senate seat distribution by state ====
Senate seat distribution by state
State/ Territory	AD	COPEI /UFR	URD	PCV
Federal District	2	1	1	
Anzoátegui	2			
Apure	2			
Aragua	2			
Barinas	2			
Bolívar	2			
Carabobo	2			
Cojedes	2			
Falcón	2			
Guárico	2			
Lara	2			
Mérida		2		
Miranda	2			
Monagas	2			
Nueva Esparta	2			
Portuguesa	2			
Sucre	2			
Táchira		2		
Trujillo	2	1		
Yaracuy	2			
Zulia	2			1
Amazonas Federal Territory				
Delta Amacuro Federal Territory				
Source: CSE

=== State legislative assemblies ===
State	AD	COPEI /UFR	URD	PCV
Anzoátegui	13		1	
Apure	11	1		
Aragua	12	2		
Barinas	9	3		
Bolívar	11	1		
Carabobo	14	2		
Cojedes	10	1	1	
Falcón	17	2		
Guárico	13	1		
Lara	18	2		1
Mérida	6	10		
Miranda	15	2		
Monagas	12		1	
Nueva Esparta	8		4	
Portuguesa	11	1		
Sucre	18		2	
Táchira	6	12		
Trujillo	12	7		
Yaracuy	12	1		
Zulia	18	2		2
Source: CSE

=== Municipal councils ===
State/ Territory	AD	COPEI	URD PLP	PCV
Federal District	14	6	1	1
Amazonas Federal Territory	2		3	
Delta Amacuro Federal Territory	4		1	
Source: CSE, Arráiz Lucca

== Aftermath ==
The government was overthrown by a coup d'état on 24 November 1948, which eventually led to the dictatorship of Marcos Pérez Jiménez.

== Works cited ==
- Diamond, Larry; Linz, Juan; Lipset, Seymour, eds. (1989). Democracy In Developing Countries: Latin America. Vol. 4. Lynne Rienner Publishers. ISBN 1555870430.
- Herman, Donald (1980). Christian Democracy in Venezuela. University of North Carolina Press. ISBN 0807814253.
- Singh, Kelvin (1989). "Oil Politics in Venezuela during the López Contreras Administration (1936-1941)". Journal of Latin American Studies. 21 (1). Cambridge University Press: 89–104. doi:10.2307/157250. JSTOR 157250.
