= El Trienio Adeco =

Three-year period of Venezuelan history

Trienio Adeco
- 1945–1948
Medina government	Military dictatorship in Venezuela
- Location: Venezuela
- Leaders: Rómulo Betancourt; Rómulo Gallegos
- Key events: 1945 Venezuelan coup d'état (start); 1947 Venezuelan general election; 1948 Venezuelan coup d'état (end)

El Trienio Adeco (from the initials of the Democratic Action (Spanish: Acción Democratica, an adjective also used for its members or supporters) was a three-year period in Venezuelan history, from 1945 to 1948, under the governments of Rómulo Betancourt and Rómulo Gallegos. The party gained office via the 1945 Venezuelan coup d'état against President Isaías Medina Angarita, and held the first democratic elections in Venezuelan history, beginning with the 1946 Venezuelan Constituent Assembly election. The 1947 Venezuelan general election saw Democratic Action formally elected to office, but it was removed from office shortly after in the 1948 Venezuelan coup d'état.

== Background ==
In exile Rómulo Betancourt had flirted with communism but he came to believe that he was not going to get very far along that path. President Isaías Medina Angarita fostered the further professionalization of the Venezuelan officer corps. Among others, he sent Capt. Marcos Pérez Jiménez to the Peruvian military academy, which was reputed in Latin America as being very efficient, where the young Andean officer had as professor Gen. Manuel Odria, later to become dictator of Perú. Another Peruvian influence on Venezuelan politics was Víctor Raúl Haya de la Torre, who tried to create an inter-American alliance of leftist anti-imperialist parties, which vaguely fitted Betancourt's own program. Another up-and-coming officer was Carlos Delgado Chalbaud, the son of the anti-Juan Vicente Gómez conspirator Román Delgado Chalbaud. Delgado Chalbaud had spent most of his life in France, where he studied engineering and later attended the St. Cyr military academy. He returned to Venezuela in 1939 and was promptly commissioned in the Venezuelan army by president General Eleazar Lopez Contreras. Because of his background, Delgado was the undisputed leader of a group of conspirational officers, among whom the second most important was Marcos Pérez Jiménez.

== 1945 coup d'etat ==
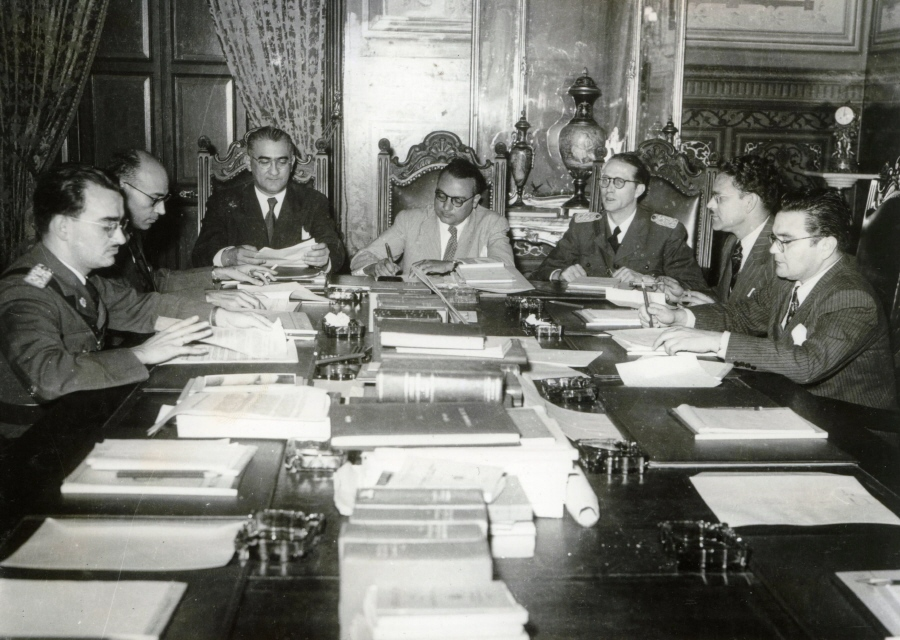
Members of the Revolutionary Government Junta, from left to right: Mario Ricardo Vargas, Raúl Leoni, Valmore Rodríguez, Rómulo Betancourt, Carlos Delgado Chalbaud, Edmundo Fernández and Gonzalo Barrios. Miraflores Palace, 1945

As the 1945 elections approached, Betancourt, who knew how large his national political base was now, accepted Medina's invitation to participate in them on the tacit understanding that the official candidate, Diógenes Escalante, would win with the support of Acción Democrática (AD), as Betancourt's party had been named. In exchange, the following elections would be totally democratic.

Escalante was party to this agreement, but on his return to Venezuela from Washington, where he was ambassador, to participate in his own election, he started mumbling and making incoherent statements. The man was insane being forced to abandon politics and spend the rest of his life in a psychiatric center in Miami, Florida. President Medina then made a mistake, to choose a substitute for Escalante without consulting AD. He proposed to his Minister of Agriculture, Ángel Biaggini, but this one did not count on the favor of Betancourt, and the route of coup d'état was activated again. Betancourt was incensed and so it was that the strongest political party in Venezuela and the military conspirators, none of which had a rank higher than major, made a deal whose consequences were to be long-lasting.

In October 1945, the military declared itself in open rebellion in Caracas and Betancourt called on the people to stage a civilian uprising. Medina resigned, but it is generally acknowledged that the army, except for the rebels, was on his side and could have put down the rebellion and arrest the insubordinate officers. The army was the making of Gomez and Lopez Contreras and even Medina and was a disciplined institution. However, the long history of violence in Venezuelan politics during the previous century made Medina not want a bloody civil war on his hands.

== Adeco governments ==
=== First presidency of Rómulo Betancourt ===
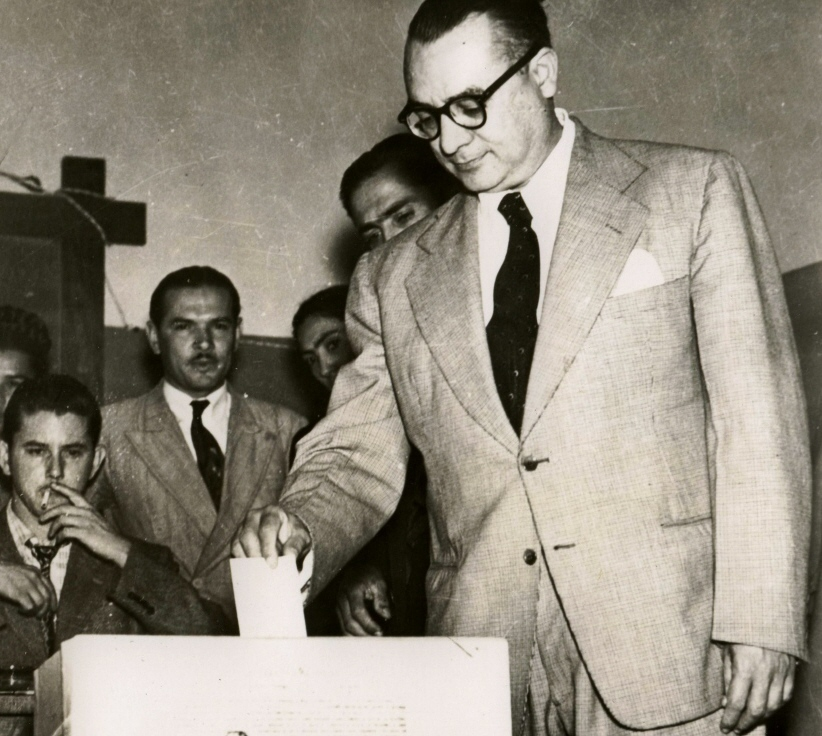
Rómulo Betancourt voting in the 1946 elections

A junta formed, headed by Betancourt, as provisional president, and with Carlos Delgado Chalbaud as Minister of Defence. The 1946 Venezuelan Constituent Assembly election showed that AD under Betancourt had indeed become the party of the vast majority of Venezuelans. Two other parties were founded: COPEI (Independent Electoral Committee), by the pro-clerical Rafael Caldera, whose party later was later re-baptized Social Christian COPEI; and URD (Democratic Republican Union), which was joined by Jóvito Villalba, considered one of the greatest orators in Venezuelan history, and made over practically into his personal party.

Since the death of Gomez, the following governments had been gradually increasing oil taxes. In the Junta, development minister Juan Pablo Pérez Alfonso decreed a 50-50 sharing agreement with the oil companies. The junta also took other daring measures. Catholic schools, which were the best in the country, were forced to close temporarily while a new national curriculum was elaborated. Agrarian reform was approved. Bureucracy was expanded due to the extent of the reforms, but also because AD had to reward its more prominent backers.

The divide between 'blanco' ('white') and 'pardo' was nominally abolished although in practice not many pardos could fulfill even the lowest requirements for civil service, into which nevertheless many entered. A national educational campaign was inaugurated, however low literacy rates and literacy requirements for teachers meant that the system was under great strain.

=== Presidency of Rómulo Gallegos ===
There was a national election for the presidency in 1947, which the 'adeco' candidate, the talented novelist Rómulo Gallegos, won, again by a huge margin. But at the time there was much discontent in the middle class, which was Caldera's base of support—he got 262,000 votes—not to speak of the upper crust; and of course the officers who had ushered AD into power were on the lookout for the main chance.

== 1948 coup d'etat ==
There was no particular incident that set off the bloodless 1948 coup, which was led by Carlos Delgado Chalbaud. There was no popular opposition. This might have meant that the odds were too great or that the pardo masses had not noticed any particular improvement in their lives despite the incessant government propaganda. All prominent adecos were expelled. The other parties were allowed but muzzled.
