= Rómulo Gallegos =

Venezuelan politician and writer (1884–1969)

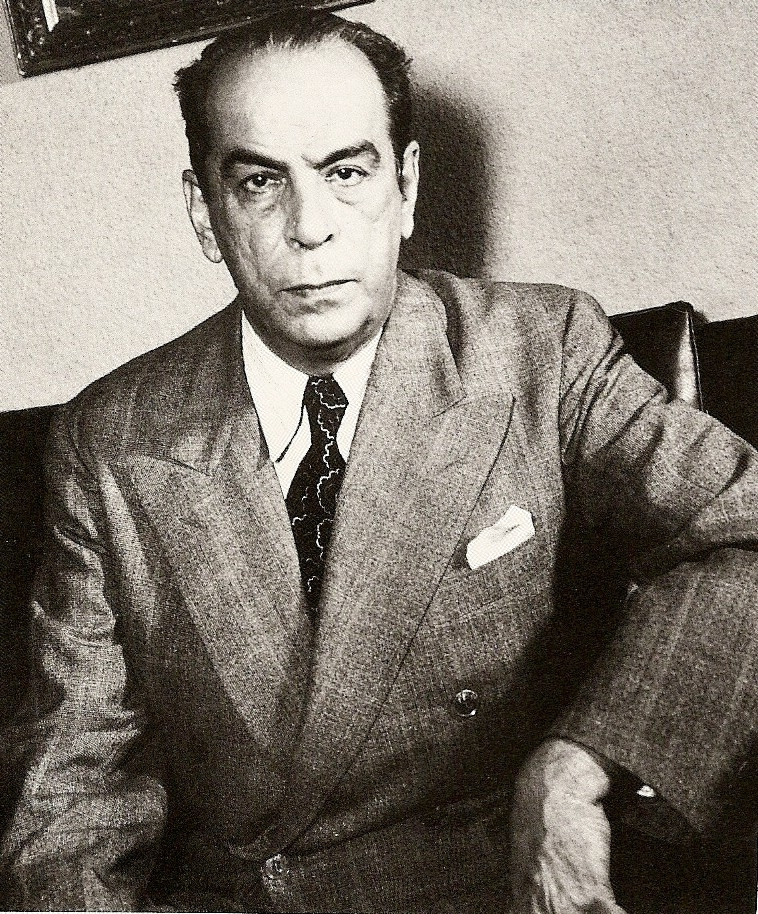
- Gallegos c. 1947-48

39th President of Venezuela
- In office 15 February 1948 – 24 November 1948
- Preceded by: Rómulo Betancourt
- Succeeded by: Carlos Delgado Chalbaud

Senator for life
- In office 23 January 1961 – 5 April 1969

Personal details
- Born: Rómulo Ángel del Monte Carmelo Gallegos Freire; 2 August 1884 Caracas, Venezuela
- Died: 5 April 1969 (aged 84) Caracas, Venezuela
- Party: Acción Democrática
- Spouse: Teotiste Arocha Egui (1888–1950)

Rómulo Ángel del Monte Carmelo Gallegos y Freire (2 August 1884 – 5 April 1969) was a Venezuelan novelist and politician. In 1948, he became the first freely elected president in Venezuela's history. He was removed from power after only nine months by a military coup.

Rómulo Gallegos is considered the most important Venezuelan novelist of the 20th century and a prominent figure in Latin American literature.

== Early life and writings ==
Rómulo Gallegos was born in Caracas to Rómulo Gallegos Osío and Rita Freire Guruceaga, into a family of humble origin. He began his work as a schoolteacher, writer, classical music enthusiast and journalist in 1903. His novel Doña Bárbara was first published in 1929 and it was because of the book's criticisms of the regime of longtime dictator Juan Vicente Gómez that he was forced to flee the country. He took refuge in Spain, where he continued to write: his acclaimed novels Cantaclaro (1934) and Canaima (1935) date from this period. He returned to Venezuela in 1936 and was appointed Minister of Public Education.

== Political career ==
In 1937 he was elected to Congress and, in 1940–41, served as Mayor of Caracas.

In 1945, Rómulo Gallegos was involved in the coup d'état that brought Rómulo Betancourt and the "Revolutionary Government Junta" to power, in the period known as El Trienio Adeco.

=== Administration ===
In the 1947 general election he ran for the presidency of the republic as the Acción Democrática candidate and won in what is generally believed to be the country's first honest election. He took over 74 percent of the vote, still a record for a free election in Venezuela. He took office on 15 February and was noted for raising the state's tax revenue for oil profits increase from 43% to 50%, a tax scheme known as "fifty / fifty" and which was subsequently replicated in several oil producing countries such as Saudi Arabia. President Gallegos initiated the implementation of an "open-door" policy, which sparked an influx of Italians, eventually becoming the largest European population group within Venezuela. Nevertheless, army officers Carlos Delgado Chalbaud, Marcos Pérez Jiménez and Luis Felipe Llovera Páez overthrew him in the 1948 Venezuelan coup d'état in November of that year. He took refuge first in Cuba and then in Mexico.

==== Cabinet ====
Cabinet of Rómulo Gallegos
Ministry	Name	Períod
Internal Relations	Eligio Anzola Anzola	February – November, 1948
External relationships	Andrés Eloy Blanco	February – November, 1948
Treasury	Manuel Pérez Guerrero	February – November, 1948
Defense	Carlos Delgado Chalbaud	February – November, 1948
Development	Juan Pablo Pérez Alfonzo	February – November, 1948
Public Works	Edgar Pardo Stolk	February – November, 1948
Education	Luis Beltrán Prieto Figueroa	February – November, 1948
Jobs	Raúl Leoni	February – November, 1948
Communications	Leonardo Ruiz Pineda	February – November, 1948
Agriculture & Livestock	Ricardo Montilla	February – November, 1948
Health & Social Care	Edmundo Fernández	February – November, 1948
Office	Gonzalo Barrios	February – November, 1948

== Later life ==
Gallegos returned to his country after the fall of the dictatorship of Marcos Pérez Jiménez in 1958. While he was named a senator for life, he no longer took an active role in politics.

Gallegos was awarded the National Literature Prize (1958, for La doncella), and elected to the Venezuelan Academy of the Language (the correspondent agency in Venezuela of the Spanish Royal Academy).

From 1960 to 1963, he was a Commissioner of the newly created Inter-American Commission on Human Rights (created by OAS in Washington on 18 August 1959), and he was also its first President (1960) a position he held until 1963.

== Accolades ==
He was nominated for the Nobel Prize in Literature in 1960, largely due to the efforts of Miguel Otero Silva and gained widespread support in Latin America, but ultimately lost out to Saint-John Perse. The Rómulo Gallegos International Novel Prize was created in his honor on 6 August 1964 by a presidential decree, enacted by Venezuelan president Raúl Leoni. The declared purpose of the prize is to "perpetuate and honor the work of the eminent novelist and also to stimulate the creative activity of Spanish language writers." It is awarded by the government of Venezuela, through the offices of the Rómulo Gallegos Center for Latin American Studies (Celarg). The first prize was given in 1967. It was awarded every five years until 1987, when it became a biannual award. The award includes a cash prize of €100,000 making it among the richest literary prizes in the world.

== Personal life and death ==
Gallegos was married to Teotiste Arocha Egui, who served as First Lady of Venezuela in 1948. He died in Caracas on 5 April 1969.

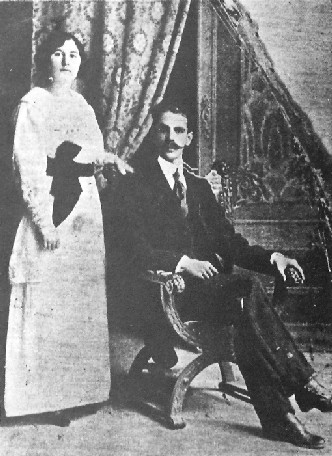
Gallegos and Teotiste

In 2016 his grave was desecrated by thieves, who stole the marble and his remains. His granddaughter took to Twitter to express her frustration: "Here in Venezuela, not even the remains of an ex-president can be kept away from the hands of crime."

== Published works ==
Venezuelan Presidential election 1947
Results

Candidates	Votes
Rómulo Gallegos	871,752
Rafael Caldera	262,204
Gustavo Machado	36,587

- El último Solar (1920) (alternative title:Reinaldo Solar)
- La trepadora (1925)
- Doña Bárbara (1929)
- Cantaclaro (1934)
- Canaima (1935) (also published in English, 1988 ISBN 0-8061-2119-X)
- Pobre negro (1937)
- El forastero (1942)
- Sobre la misma tierra (1943)
- La rebelión (1946)
- La brizna de paja en el viento (1952)
- Una posición en la vida (1954)
- El último patriota (1957)
- El piano viejo

== See also ==
- Presidents of Venezuela
- List of Venezuelans

Political offices
Preceded by Rómulo Betancourt	President of Venezuela; 1948	Succeeded by Carlos Delgado Chalbaud
