= 1948 Venezuelan coup d'état =

Coup d'état

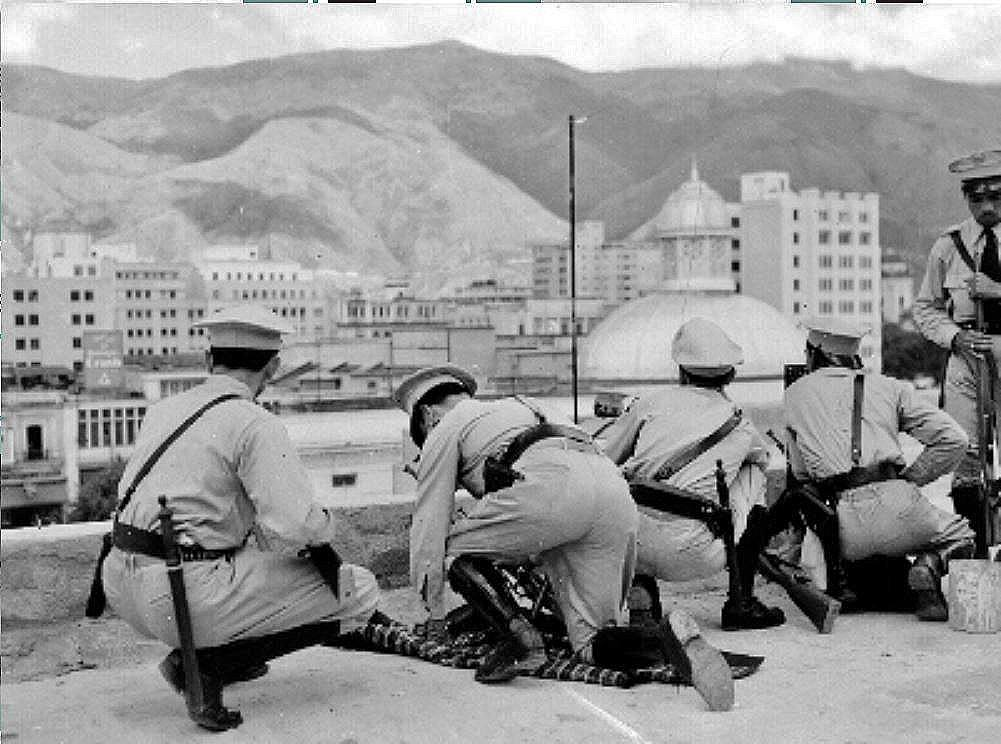
- Soldiers on the roof of the Venezuelan Congress during the coup.
Date	24 November 1948
Location	Venezuela
Status	Rómulo Gallegos removed from power; End of Trienio Adeco; Start of military dictatorship in Venezuela

Belligerents
Venezuela (Chalbaud) faction	(Venezuela) Venezuelan government

Commanders and leaders
(Venezuela) Carlos Delgado Chalbaud (Venezuela) Marcos Pérez Jiménez (Venezuela) Luis Felipe Llovera Páez	(Venezuela) Rómulo Gallegos

The 1948 Venezuelan coup d'état took place on 24 November 1948, when Carlos Delgado Chalbaud, Marcos Pérez Jiménez and Luis Felipe Llovera Páez overthrew the elected president, Rómulo Gallegos, who had been elected in the 1947 Venezuelan general election (generally believed to be the country's first honest election) and had taken office in February 1948. Chalbaud had been Gallegos' minister of defense. Jiménez took command of the country as its dictator.

Democracy would not be restored until the 1958 Venezuelan coup d'état overthrew Jiménez.

== Aftermath ==
The military coup was publicly justified as an institutional response by the Armed Forces to counter the perceived threats of political sectarianism and persistent agitation by factions accused of squandering opportunities to act in the nation's best interests.

Days after the coup, Carlos Delgado Chalbaud privately informed the U.S. Ambassador that "Gallegos had allowed himself to be controlled by (Rómulo) Betancourt" and that Democratic Action sought to "organize its own Armed Forces and impose a Marxist government, even at the risk of civil war".

Former President Gallegos, speaking from exile, declared:

"What does it mean that —as confirmed by sources I consider absolutely reliable— a military attaché from a foreign power's embassy was observed acting as an advisor or collaborator at one of Caracas' main military barracks during the armed insurrection...?"

These statements provoked discomfort at the U.S. Embassy in Venezuela and the White House, which delayed its recognition of the new de facto government longer than anticipated.
