= Circle of Perpetual Adoration =

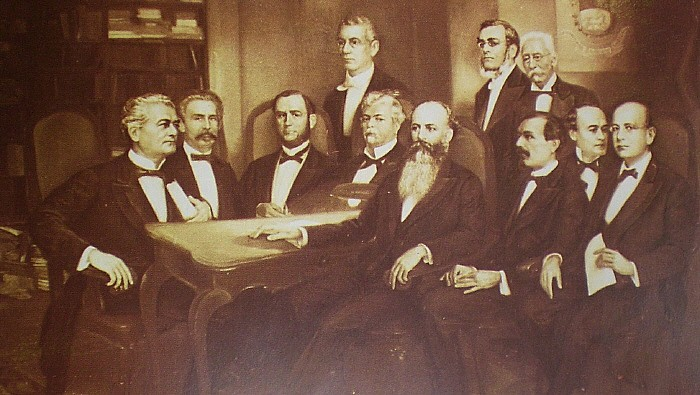
Antonio Guzmán Blanco and his cabinet.

Perpetual Adoration or the Circle of Perpetual Adoration was the colloquial term used to name the promoters of tributes to the dictator Antonio Guzmán Blanco in Venezuela during his government. Francisco González Guinán, Juan Pablo Rojas Paúl and Andrés Simón Ibarra were described as some of them.
