= Southern General Cemetery =

Cemetery in Caracas, Venezuela

Coordinates: 10.479°N 66.921°W

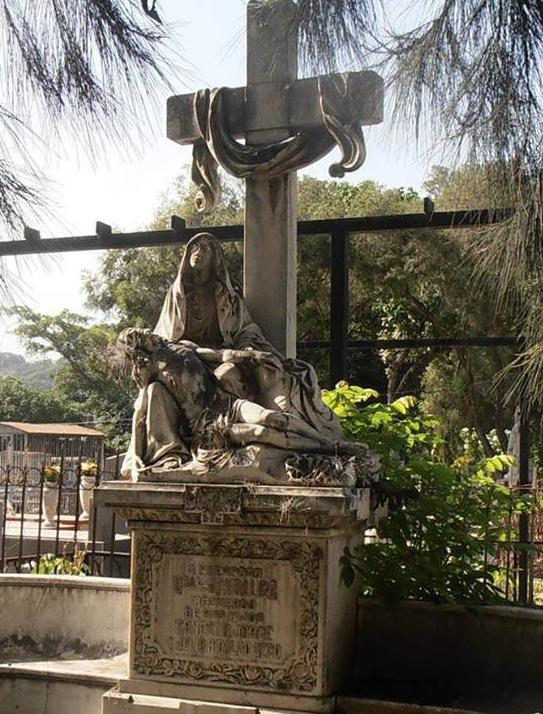
- View of the cemetery
- Interactive map of Southern General Cemetery

Details
- Established: 1876
- Location: Municipality Libertador; Caracas; Venezuela

The Southern General Cemetery (Cementerio General del Sur) is the largest cemetery in Caracas. It was founded in 1876, by order of President Antonio Guzmán Blanco. It is located at the end of El Cementerio and El Degredo streets, in the parish of Santa Rosalia, west of Libertador Municipality.

== Cemetery ==
The administration of the cemetery is the responsibility of the Municipal Cemeteries management department, which is attached to Fundacaracas, a foundation of the Libertador Municipality's government. It has the support of Fundapatrimonio, the municipal police in Caracas and the Institute of Cultural Heritage.

Among the well-known Venezuelan persons buried there are: Armando Reverón, Raimundo Andueza Palacio, Juan Pablo Rojas Paúl, Miguel Otero Silva, Carlos Delgado Chalbaud, Andrés Mata, Martín Tovar y Tovar, Juan Antonio Pérez Bonalde, Rómulo Gallegos, Manuel Díaz Rodríguez, Argimiro Gabaldón, Fabricio Ojeda, Aquiles Nazoa, Andrés Eloy Blanco, Jorge Antonio Rodríguez, Anacleto Clemente Bolívar, Látigo Chávez, General Ramón Centeno, and Victorino Ponce. Some have special memorials such as the Caldera Family, the Firefighters' Pantheon, the President's Pantheon, and Isaías Medina Angarita and Joaquín Crespo's mausoleum, the last one built in 1898.

== See also ==
- Eastern Cemetery (Caracas)
