= Félix Plasencia =

Venezuelan diplomat (born 1972)

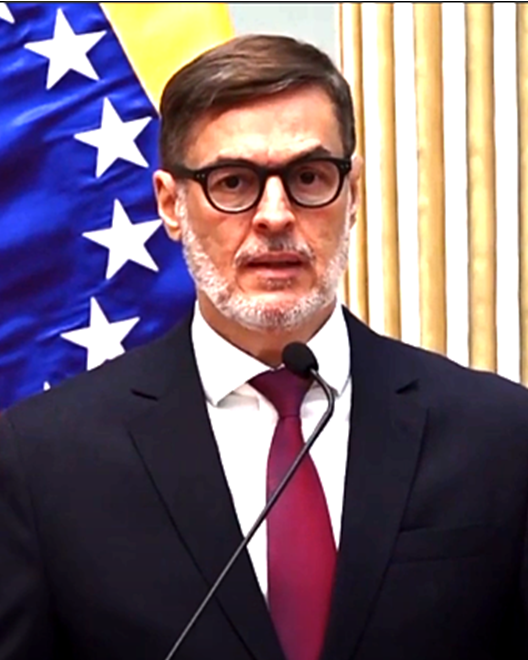
- Felix Plasencia in 2022 in La Paz, Bolivia

Minister of Foreign Affairs and Foreign Trade
- In office 14 July 2026 – 29 October 2026
- President: Delcy Rodríguez (acting)
- Preceded by: Yván Gil
- Succeeded by: Oliver Blanco

Minister of Foreign Affairs
- In office 20 August 2021 – 16 May 2022
- President: Nicolás Maduro
- Preceded by: Jorge Arreaza
- Succeeded by: Carlos Faría

Personal details
- Born: Félix Ramón Plasencia González; 15 August 1972 (age 54) Maracay, Republic of Venezuela
- Party: United Socialist Party of Venezuela (PSUV)
- Education: Central University of Venezuela

Félix Ramón Plasencia González is a Venezuelan diplomat and politician who served as Minister of Foreign Affairs and Foreign Trade and Venezuelan Representative to the United States since 2026. He previously served as Minister of Foreign Affairs of Venezuela between 2021 and 2022. He also held the positions of Vice Minister for Multilateral Affairs at the Ministry of Foreign Affairs, as well as Vice Minister for Asia, the Middle East, and Oceania, respectively, and at the Ministry of Tourism and Foreign Trade.

== Biography ==
He graduated from the Central University of Venezuela, where he studied International Studies. He also holds a master's degree in European Studies from the Catholic University of Leuven, Belgium, and a postgraduate degree in Diplomatic Studies from New College, Oxford University, in the United Kingdom.

=== Diplomatic career ===
Plasencia joined the Venezuelan diplomatic corps in 1991 through a public competition, under the administration of Carlos Andrés Pérez. He met the current acting President, Delcy Rodríguez, then part of the diplomatic corps, when they worked at the Venezuelan embassy in London in 1994, during the presidency of Rafael Caldera.

With the arrival of the Bolivarian Revolution to power, Plasencia remained as a career diplomat in the Foreign Ministry. In 2012, he was appointed Director of International Relations of the Mayor's Office of the Libertador Municipality of Caracas, and president of Fundapatrimonio, under the mandate of the mayor at the time, Jorge Rodríguez. In 2014, he was appointed by then-Foreign Minister Delcy Rodríguez as Director of Protocol at the Ministry of Foreign Affairs.

According to Infobae, when Plasencia was in charge of the administration of the Foreign Ministry, he ordered the early retirement of all career diplomats, including those in his own class, "because they were not sympathetic to the regime". Plasencia was appointed Deputy Minister for Asia, the Middle East and Oceania in 2016 and Deputy Minister for Multilateral Issues. He hosted the Venezuelan government during the visit of the United Nations High Commissioner for Human Rights, Michelle Bachelet, in June 2019. He was also part of the Chavista delegation at the failed negotiation table in Norway in July of that year.

In August 2019, he was appointed by President Nicolás Maduro as Minister of Tourism and Foreign Trade. A few months later, in December, he became head of government of the Insular Territory Francisco de Miranda. In January 2020, the presence of Félix Plasencia at Barajas Airport, Madrid, generated a political controversy in Spain, since according to police sources, the Spanish minister José Luis Ábalos had boarded Delcy Rodríguez's plane to ask her not to get off the aircraft because she would be arrested. Ábalos stated that he was at the airport to greet Plasencia, whom he described as a "personal friend," and not to meet with Rodríguez.

Between 2020 and 2021, he served as Venezuela's ambassador to China. On August 19, 2021, Nicolás Maduro appointed Plasencia as Foreign Minister of the Republic, replacing Jorge Arreaza. For Milos Alcalay, former Venezuelan Foreign Minister, "Becoming Foreign Minister makes him no longer a career official; it is a political decision. I think we should give him the benefit of the doubt and wait a while, because we have to see if he will continue to act as a professional, which is difficult in a regime like Maduro's, in terms of fulfilling the scope of a diplomatic career, or if, on the contrary, he will take on a more political role," pondering whether being a career diplomat would impact the Venezuelan government's foreign policy.

In addition to being Venezuelan by birth, Plasencia holds Spanish nationality, being the son of Spanish immigrants from Tenerife.

On February 3, 2026, the acting President Rodríguez appointed longtime ally Plasencia as her representative in the United States. On July 14, 2026, Rodríguez announced that the Ministries of Foreign Affairs and Foreign Trade would be merged into a single post, appointing Plasencia as its head.
