= Rafael Seijas =

Venezuelan political figure

Minister of Foreign Affairs of Venezuela
- In office 9 August 1861 – 1 January 1862
- President: José Antonio Páez
- In office 9 December 1865 – 24 July 1867
- President: Juan Crisóstomo Falcón
- In office 3 October 1865 – 5 March 1867
- President: Juan Crisóstomo Falcón
- In office 15 June 1878 – 5 August 1878
- President: Antonio Guzmán Blanco
- In office 30 April 1881 – 27 April 1884
- President: Antonio Guzmán Blanco
- In office 20 January 1890 – 19 March 1890
- President: Juan Pablo Rojas Paúl

Rafael Seijas was a Venezuelan political figure. He served as the Minister of Foreign Affairs of Venezuela multiple terms, holding the position as of 1882. In 1883 and 1884, he oversaw the process of drawing maps between the boundaries of British Guiana and Venezuela, working with a Colonel Mansfield until April 1884. He authored a series of papers in 1898, again on the arbitration of the Venezuela and British Guiana borders.

== See also ==
- List of ministers of foreign affairs of Venezuela

Political offices
Preceded by Jesús María Morales Marcano	60th Minister of Foreign Affairs of Venezuela; 9 August 1861 – 1 January 1862	Succeeded by Pedro José Rojas
Preceded by Antonio Guzmán Blanco	70th Minister of Foreign Affairs of Venezuela; 9 December 1865 – 24 July 1867	Succeeded by Jesús María Sistiaga
Preceded by Antonio Guzmán Blanco	72nd Minister of Foreign Affairs of Venezuela; 3 October 1865 – 5 March 1867	Succeeded by Jesús María Sistiaga
Preceded by Sebastián Casañas	95th Minister of Foreign Affairs of Venezuela; 15 June 1878 – 5 August 1878	Succeeded by Trinidad Célis Ávila
Preceded by Pedro José Saavedra	104th Minister of Foreign Affairs of Venezuela; 30 April 1881 – 27 April 1884	Succeeded by Vicente Amengual
Preceded by Pascual Casanova	115th Minister of Foreign Affairs of Venezuela; 20 January 1890 – 19 March 1890	Succeeded by Marco Antonio Saluzzo
