= List of ministers of foreign affairs of Venezuela =

Minister of Foreign Affairs and International Trade
- Ministro de Relaciones Exteriores y Comercio Internacional
- Coat of arms of Venezuela

- Incumbent; Oliver Blanco since 29 October 2026
- Ministry of People's Power for Foreign Affairs and International Trade
- Style: Mr./Madam Minister (Señor/a Ministro/a) (informal); Chancellor (Canciller) (informal); The Most Excellent (Excelentísimo/a Señor/a) (diplomatic)
- Member of: Cabinet of Venezuela
- Residence: Casa Amarilla
- Seat: Plaza Bolívar, Caracas
- Appointer: President of Venezuela
- Formation: 1830
- First holder: Diego Bautista Urbaneja
- Salary: 2.916 Bolívares Soberanos
- Website: mppre.gob.ve

The following is a list of ministers of foreign affairs of Venezuela since 1830, when Venezuela achieved independence after the dissolution of Gran Colombia. The founding minister was Diego Bautista Urbaneja, who held multiple terms. The current minister is Félix Plasencia, who assumed office on 14 July 2026.

== List ==
| No. | Name | President | Term of office | |
|---|---|---|---|---|
| 3 | Diego Bautista Urbaneja | José Antonio Páez | 13 Jan 1830 | 28 May 1830 |
| 4 | Santos Michelena | José Antonio Páez | 28 May 1830 | 8 Jun 1833 |
| 5 | José Luis Ramos (interim) | Andrés Narvarte | 8 Jun 1833 | 15 Oct 1833 |
| 6 | Pedro Pablo Díaz | Andrés Narvarte | 15 Oct 1833 | 20 Jan 1835 |
| 7 | José Luis Ramos (2nd term) | José María Vargas | 20 Jan 1835 | 29 Mar 1835 |
| 8 | Santos Michelena (2nd term) | José María Vargas | 29 Mar 1835 | 26 Nov 1835 |
| 9 | José Eusebio Gallegos | José María Vargas | 26 Nov 1835 | 15 Jan 1837 |
| 10 | José Luis Ramos (3rd term) | José María Vargas | 15 Jan 1837 | 20 Jan 1837 |
| 11 | Manuel Echeandía | José María Carreño | 20 Jan 1837 | 13 Mar 1837 |
| 12 | José Luis Ramos (4th term) | Carlos Soublette | 13 Mar 1837 | 12 Apr 1837 |
| 13 | Santos Michelena (3rd term) | Carlos Soublette | 12 Apr 1837 | 30 May 1837 |
| 14 | Guillermo Smith | Carlos Soublette; José Antonio Páez | 30 May 1837 | 22 May 1841 |
| 15 | Francisco Aranda | José Antonio Páez; Carlos Soublette | 22 May, 1841 | 26 Mar, 1844 |
| 16 | Juan Manuel Manrique | Carlos Soublette | 26 Mar 1844 | 20 Jan 1847 |
| 17 | Pedro de las Casas | Diego Bautista Urbaneja | 20 Jan 1847 | 4 Mar 1847 |
| 18 | Miguel Herrera | José Tadeo Monagas | 4 Mar 1847 | 3 May 1847 |
| 19 | Pedro de las Casas (interim) | José Tadeo Monagas | 3 May 1847 | 24 May 1847 |
| 20 | José Félix Blanco | José Tadeo Monagas | 24 May 1847 | 20 Nov 1847 |
| 21 | Rafael Acevedo | José Tadeo Monagas | 20 Nov 1847 | 31 Oct 1848 |
| 22 | Antonio Leocadio Guzmán | José Tadeo Monagas | 31 Oct 1848 | 5 Feb 1849 |
| 23 | Ramón Yepes | José Tadeo Monagas | 5 Feb 1849 | 8 Mar 1849 |
| 24 | José Rafael Revenga | José Tadeo Monagas | 8 Mar 1849 | 23 Apr 1849 |
| 25 | Diego Antonio Caballero | José Tadeo Monagas | 23 Apr 1849 | 4 May 1849 |
| 26 | Jacinto Gutiérrez Martínez | José Tadeo Monagas | 4 May 1849 | 6 Sep 1849 |
| 27 | Vicente Lecuna | José Tadeo Monagas | 6 Sep 1849 | 26 Sep 1849 |
| 28 | Rafael Agostine | José Tadeo Monagas | 26 Sep 1849 | 6 Dec 1849 |
| 29 | Manuel Machín Quintero | José Tadeo Monagas | 6 Dec 1849 | 20 Feb 1850 |
| 30 | Fernando Olavarría | José Tadeo Monagas | 20 Feb 1850 | 5 Jun 1850 |
| 31 | Vicente Lecuna (2nd term) | José Tadeo Monagas | 5 Jun 1850 | 18 Jan 1851 |
| 32 | Esteban Herrera | José Tadeo Monagas | 18 Jan 1851 | 14 Feb 1851 |
| 33 | José María Heres | José Gregorio Monagas | 14 Feb 1851 | 22 Mar 1851 |
| 34 | Carlos Gellineau | José Gregorio Monagas | 22 Mar 1851 | 5 May 1851 |
| 35 | Francisco Aranda (2nd term) | José Gregorio Monagas | 5 May 1851 | 17 Sep 1851 |
| 36 | Joaquín Herrera | José Gregorio Monagas | 17 Sep 1851 | 27 Jan 1853 |
| 37 | Ramón Yepes (2nd term) | José Gregorio Monagas | 27 Jan 1853 | 29 Mar 1853 |
| 38 | Simón Planas | José Gregorio Monagas | 29 Mar 1853 | 20 Jan 1855 |
| 39 | Julián Viso | Joaquín Herrera | 20 Jan 1855 | 26 Jan 1855 |
| 40 | Juan Pablo Rojas Paúl | Joaquín Herrera | 26 Jan 1855 | 7 Feb 1855 |
| 41 | Francisco Aranda (3rd term) | José Tadeo Monagas | 7 Feb 1855 | 9 Dec 1855 |
| 42 | Jacinto Gutiérrez Martínez (2nd term) | José Tadeo Monagas | 9 Dec 1855 | 15 Mar 1858 |
| 43 | Ramón Yepes (3rd term) | Junta Provisional de Gobierno | 15 Mar 1858 | 19 Mar, 1858 |
| 44 | Wenceslao Urrutia | Julián Castro | 19 Mar, 1858 | 14 Apr, 1858 |
| 45 | Fermín Toro | Julián Castro | 14 Apr 1858 | 17 Jun 1859 |
| 46 | Miguel Herrera | Julián Castro | 17 Jun 1859 | 29 Jul 1858 |
| 47 | Mauricio Berrisbeitia | Julián Castro | 30 Jul 1858 | 21 Aug 1858 |
| 48 | Luis Sanojo | Julián Castro | 21 Aug 1858 | 24 Feb 1859 |
| 49 | Carlos Soublette | Julián Castro | 24 Feb 1858 | 4 Apr 1859 |
| 50 | Pedro de las Casas (2nd term) | Julián Castro | 4 Apr 1859 | 11 Jun 1859 |
| 51 | Juan José Mendoza | Julián Castro | 11 Jun 1859 | 20 Jun 1859 |
| 52 | Estanislao Rondón | Julián Castro | 20 Jun 1859 | 16 Aug 1859 |
| 53 | Manuel Machín Quintero (2nd term) | Julián Castro | 16 Aug 1859 | 29 Dec 1859 |
| 54 | Jesús María Morales Marcano | Julián Castro | 29 Dec 1859 | 18 Apr 1860 |
| 55 | Juan José Mendoza (2nd term) | Julián Castro | 18 Apr 1860 | 20 Jul 1860 |
| 56 | Pedro de las Casas (3rd term) | Julián Castro | 20 Jul, 1860 | 6 Apr, 1861 |
| 57 | Hilarión Nadal | José Antonio Páez | 6 Apr 1861 | 14 May 1861 |
| 58 | Carlos Tirado | José Antonio Páez | 14 May 1861 | 9 Jul 1861 |
| 59 | Jesús María Morales Marcano (2nd term) | José Antonio Páez | 9 Jul 1861 | 9 Aug 1861 |
| 60 | Rafael Seijas | José Antonio Páez | 9 Aug 1861 | 1 Jan 1862 |
| 61 | Pedro José Rojas | José Antonio Páez | 1 Jan 1862 | 11 Jan 1862 |
| 62 | Manuel Porras | José Antonio Páez | 11 Jun 1862 | 4 Jul 1862 |
| 63 | Jesús María Morales Marcano (3rd term) | José Antonio Páez | 4 Jul 1862 | 15 Jun 1863 |
| 64 | Antonio Guzmán Blanco | Juan Crisóstomo Falcón | 25 Jul 1863 | 7 Aug 1863 |
| 65 | Guillermo Tell Villegas | Juan Crisóstomo Falcón | 7 Aug 1863 | 21 Jan 1864 |
| 66 | Antonio Guzmán Blanco (2nd term) | Juan Crisóstomo Falcón | 21 Jan 1864 | 6 Feb 1864 |
| 67 | Antonio María Salom | Juan Crisóstomo Falcón | 6 Feb 1864 | 7 Mar 1864 |
| 68 | José Gabriel Ochoa | Juan Crisóstomo Falcón | 7 Mar 1864 | 6 Nov 1864 |
| 69 | Juan de Dios Morales | Juan Crisóstomo Falcón | 6 Nov 1864 | 9 Dec 1864 |
| 70 | Rafael Seijas (2nd term) | Juan Crisóstomo Falcón | 9 Dec 1865 | 24 Jul 1867 |
| 71 | Antonio Guzmán Blanco (3rd term) | Juan Crisóstomo Falcón | 24 Jul 1867 | 3 Oct 1865 |
| 72 | Rafael Seijas (3rd term) | Juan Crisóstomo Falcón | 3 Oct 1865 | 5 Mar 1867 |
| 73 | Jesús María Sistiaga | Juan Crisóstomo Falcón | 5 Mar 1867 | 4 Sep 1867 |
| 74 | Jacinto Gutiérrez Martínez (3rd term) | Juan Crisóstomo Falcón | 4 Sep 1867 | 12 Feb 1868 |
| 75 | José Gabriel Ochoa | Juan Crisóstomo Falcón | 12 Feb 1868 | 8 Apr 1868 |
| 76 | José Gregorio Villafañe | Juan Crisóstomo Falcón | 8 Apr, 1868 | 28 Apr, 1868 |
| 77 | Rafael Arvelo | José Ruperto Monagas | 28 Apr, 1868 | 27 Jun, 1868 |
| 78 | Guillermo Tell Villegas (2nd term) | José Ruperto Monagas | 27 June 1868 | 24 Feb 1869 |
| 79 | Juan Pablo Rojas Paúl (2nd term) | José Ruperto Monagas | 24 Feb 1869 | 31 July 1869 |
| 80 | Idelfonso Riera Aguinagalde | José Ruperto Monagas | 31 Jul 1869 | 6 Dec 1869 |
| 81 | Juan Pablo Rojas Paúl (3rd term) | José Ruperto Monagas | 6 Dec 1869 | 27 Jan 1870 |
| 82 | Felipe Jiménez | José Ruperto Monagas | 27 Jan 1870 | 11 Apr 1870 |
| 83 | Hilarión Antich Herrera | José Ruperto Monagas | 11 Apr, 1870 | 28 Apr, 1870 |
| 84 | Diego Bautista Barrios | Antonio Guzmán Blanco | 28 Apr, 1870 | 6 May, 1870 |
| 85 | Antonio Leocadio Guzmán (2nd term) | Antonio Guzmán Blanco | 6 May 1870 | 16 Sep 1872 |
| 86 | Diego Bautista Barrios (2nd term) | Antonio Guzmán Blanco | 18 Sep 1872 | 17 Oct 1872 |
| 87 | Diego Bautista Barrios (3rd term) | Antonio Guzmán Blanco | 18 Oct 1872 | 30 Jun 1873 |
| 88 | Jacinto Gutiérrez Martínez (4th term) | Antonio Guzmán Blanco | 30 Jun 1873 | Dec 1874 |
| 89 | Jesús María Bernal | Antonio Guzmán Blanco | Jan 1875 | 13 Jul 1876 |
| 90 | Canuto García | Antonio Guzmán Blanco | 13 Jul 1876 | 25 Sep 1876 |
| 91 | Eduardo Calcaño | Antonio Guzmán Blanco | 25 Sep 1876 | 3 Mar 1877 |
| 92 | Raimundo Andueza Palacio | Francisco Linares Alcántara | 3 Mar 1877 | 24 Nov 1877 |
| 93 | Marco Antonio Saluzzo | Antonio Guzmán Blanco | 24 Nov 1877 | 3 Apr 1878 |
| 94 | Sebastián Casañas | Antonio Guzmán Blanco | 9 Apr 878 | 15 Jun 1878 |
| 95 | Rafael Seijas (4th term) | Antonio Guzmán Blanco | 15 Jun 1878 | 5 Aug 1878 |
| 96 | Trinidad Célis Ávila | Antonio Guzmán Blanco | 5 Aug 1878 | 1 Jan 1879 |
| 97 | Jacinto Gutiérrez Martínez (5th term) | Antonio Guzmán Blanco | 1 Jan 1879 | 7 Jan 1879 |
| 98 | Pedro Ezequiel Rojas | Antonio Guzmán Blanco | 7 Jan 1879 | 25 Feb 1879 |
| 99 | Eduardo Calcaño (2nd term) | Antonio Guzmán Blanco | 25 Feb 1879 | 23 May 1879 |
| 100 | Ángel Félix Barberii | Antonio Guzmán Blanco | 26 May 1879 | 26 Nov 1879 |
| 101 | Pedro José Saavedra | Antonio Guzmán Blanco | 26 Nov 1879 | 1 Dec 1879 |
| 102 | Julián Viso (2nd term) | Antonio Guzmán Blanco | 1 Dec 1879 | 7 Jul 1880 |
| 103 | Pedro José Saavedra (2nd term) | Antonio Guzmán Blanco | 7 Jul 1880 | 30 Apr 1881 |
| 104 | Rafael Seijas (5th term) | Antonio Guzmán Blanco | 30 Apr 1881 | 27 Apr 1884 |
| 105 | Vicente Amengual | Joaquín Crespo | 27 Apr 1884 | 19 Dec 1884 |
| 106 | Benjamín Qüenza | Joaquín Crespo | 19 Dec 1884 | 19 Feb 1886 |
| 107 | Ezequiel María González | Joaquín Crespo | 19 Feb 1886 | 15 June 1886 |
| 108 | Julián Viso (3rd term) | Joaquín Crespo | 15 Jun 1886 | 14 Sept 1886 |
| 109 | Diego Bautista Urbaneja | Joaquín Crespo | 14 Sep 1886 | 5 Sep 1888 |
| 110 | Nicanor Borges | Joaquín Crespo | 5 Sep 1888 | 6 Nov 1888 |
| 111 | Agustín Istúriz | Juan Pablo Rojas Paúl | 6 Nov 1888 | 19 Jan 1889 |
| 112 | Nicanor Borges (2nd term) | Juan Pablo Rojas Paúl | 19 Jan 1889 | 22 May 1889 |
| 113 | Antonio Parejo | Juan Pablo Rojas Paúl | 22 May 1889 | 29 Oct 1889 |
| 114 | Pascual Casanova | Juan Pablo Rojas Paúl | 29 Oct 1889 | 20 Jan 1890 |
| 115 | Rafael Seijas (6th term) | Juan Pablo Rojas Paúl | 20 Jan 1890 | 19 Mar 1890 |
| 116 | Marco Antonio Saluzzo (2nd term) | Raimundo Andueza Palacio | 19 Mar 1890 | 22 Aug 1891 |
| 117 | Feliciano Acevedo | Raimundo Andueza Palacio | 22 Aug 1891 | 19 Jan 1892 |
| 118 | Manuel Clemente Urbaneja | Raimundo Andueza Palacio | 19 Jan 1892 | 8 Oct 1892 |
| 119 | Pedro Ezequiel Rojas (2nd term) | Joaquín Crespo | 8 Oct 1892 | 29 Mar 1895 |
| 120 | Lucio Pulido | Joaquín Crespo | 30 Mar 1895 | 23 Nov 1895 |
| 121 | Pedro Ezequiel Rojas (3rd term) | Joaquín Crespo | 23 Nov 1895 | 19 Feb 1898 |
| 122 | Manuel Fombona Palacio | Joaquín Crespo | 19 Feb 1898 | 28 Feb 1898 |
| 123 | Juan Calcaño Mathieu | Ignacio Andrade | 28 Feb 1898 | 6 Oct 1899 |
| 124 | Bernardino Mosquera | Ignacio Andrade | 6 Oct 1899 | 20 Oct 1899 |
| 125 | Manuel Clemente Urbaneja (2nd term) | Ignacio Andrade | 20 Oct 1899 | 23 Oct 1899 |
| 126 | Raimundo Andueza Palacio (2nd term) | Cipriano Castro | 23 Oct 1899 | 30 July 1900 |
| 127 | Eduardo Blanco | Cipriano Castro | 30 July 1900 | 8 Nov 1901 |
| 128 | Jacinto Regino Pachano | Cipriano Castro | 8 Nov 1901 | 22 Apr 1902 |
| 129 | Manuel Fombona Palacio (2nd term) | Cipriano Castro | 1902 | 1902 |
| 130 | Diego Bautista Ferrer | Cipriano Castro | 10 May 1902 | 4 Jul 1902 |
| 131 | Rafael López Baralt | Cipriano Castro | 4 Jul 1902 | 25 Apr 1903 |
| 132 | Alejandro Urbaneja | Cipriano Castro | 25 Apr 1903 | 3 Nov 1903 |
| 133 | Gustavo J. Sanabria | Cipriano Castro | 3 Nov 1903 | 17 Jan 1905 |
| 134 | Alejandro Ybarra | Cipriano Castro | 17 Jan 1905 | 9 Apr 1906 |
| 135 | Luis Churión | Cipriano Castro | 10 Apr 1906 | 17 May 1906 |
| 136 | José de Jesús Paúl | Cipriano Castro | 17 May 1906 | 14 June 1907 |
| 137 | Luis Churión (2nd term) | Cipriano Castro | 14 June 1907 | 8 Aug 1907 |
| 138 | José de Jesús Paúl (2nd term) | Cipriano Castro | 8 Aug 1907 | 19 Dec 1908 |
| 139 | Francisco González Guinán | Juan Vicente Gómez | 19 Dec 1908 | 13 Aug 1909 |
| 140 | Juan Pietri | Juan Vicente Gómez | 13 Aug 1909 | 28 Apr 1910 |
| 141 | Ángel César Rivas | Juan Vicente Gómez | 28 Apr 1910 | 3 Jun 1910 |
| 142 | Manuel Antonio Matos | Juan Vicente Gómez | 3 Jun 1910 | 30 Apr 1912 |
| 143 | José Ladislao Andara | Juan Vicente Gómez | 30 Apr 1912 | 9 Dec 1913 |
| 144 | Manuel Díaz Rodríguez | Juan Vicente Gómez | 9 Dec 1913 | 22 Oct 1914 |
| 145 | Ignacio Andrade | Juan Vicente Gómez | 2 Oct 1914 | 7 Sept 1917 |
| 146 | Bernardino Mosquera (2nd term) | Juan Vicente Gómez | 1917 | 1919 |
| 147 | Esteban Gil Borges | Juan Vicente Gómez | 2 Jan 1919 | 7 July 1921 |
| 148 | Pedro Itriago Chacín | Eleazar López Contreras | 7 July 1921 | 15 Feb 1936 |
| 149 | Esteban Gil Borges (2nd term) | Eleazar López Contreras | 17 Feb 1936 | 5 May 1941 |
| 150 | Caracciolo Parra Pérez | Isaías Medina Angarita | 5 May 1941 | 14 Jul 1945 |
| 151 | Gustavo Herrera Grau | Isaías Medina Angarita | 14 Jul 1945 | 18 Oct 1945 |
| 152 | Carlos Morales | Rómulo Betancourt | 21 Oct 1945 | 3 Nov 1947 |
| 153 | Gonzalo Barrios (interim) | Rómulo Betancourt | 3 Nov 1947 | 15 Feb 1948 |
| 154 | Andrés Eloy Blanco | Rómulo Gallegos | 15 Feb 1948 | 24 Nov 1948 |
| 155 | Luis Emilio Gómez Ruiz | Carlos Delgado Chalbaud | 25 Nov 1948 | 19 Sep 1948 |
| 156 | Germán Suárez Flamerich | Carlos Delgado Chalbaud | 19 Sep 1949 | 16 Feb 1950 |
| 157 | Luis Emilio Gómez Ruiz (2nd term) | Germán Suárez Flamerich | 16 Feb 1950 | 6 Oct 1952 |
| 158 | Aureliano Otáñez | Marcos Pérez Jiménez | 6 Oct 1952 | 16 Feb 1956 |
| 159 | José Loreto Arismendi | Marcos Pérez Jiménez | 16 Feb 1956 | 10 Jan 1958 |
| 160 | Carlos Felice Cardot | Marcos Pérez Jiménez | 10 Jan 1958 | 23 Jan 1958 |
| 161 | Óscar García Velutini | Wolfgang Larrazabal | 23 Jan 1958 | 28 May 1958 |
| 162 | René De Sola | Edgar Sanabria | 28 May 1958 | 13 Feb 1959 |
| 163 | Ignacio Luis Arcaya | Rómulo Betancourt | 13 Feb 1959 | 25 Oct 1960 |
| 164 | Marcos Falcón Briceño | Rómulo Betancourt | 25 Oct 1960 | 11 Mar 1964 |
| 165 | Ignacio Iribarren Borges | Raúl Leoni | 11 Mar 1964 | 11 Mar 1969 |
| 166 | Arístides Calvani | Rafael Caldera | 11 Mar 1969 | 12 Mar 1974 |
| 167 | Efraín Schacht Aristeguieta | Carlos Andrés Pérez | 12 Mar 1974 | 23 Jan 1975 |
| 168 | Ramón Escovar Salom | Carlos Andrés Pérez | 23 Jan 1975 | 15 Jul 1977 |
| 169 | Simón Alberto Consalvi | Carlos Andrés Pérez | 15 July 1977 | 12 Mar 1979 |
| 170 | José Alberto Zambrano Velasco | Luis Herrera Campins | 12 Mar 1979 | 2 Feb 1984 |
| 171 | Isidro Morales Paúl | Jaime Lusinchi | 2 Feb 1984 | 13 Mar 1985 |
| 172 | Simón Alberto Consalvi (2nd term) | Jaime Lusinchi | 13 Mar 1985 | 11 Jan 1988 |
| 173 | Germán Nava Carrillo | Jaime Lusinchi | 11 Jan 1988 | 2 Feb 1989 |
| 174 | Enrique Tejera París | Carlos Andrés Pérez | 2 Feb 1989 | 27 Aug 1989 |
| 175 | Reinaldo Figueredo | Carlos Andrés Pérez | 27 Aug 1989 | 15 Apr 1991 |
| 176 | Armando Durán | Carlos Andrés Pérez | 15 Apr 1991 | 10 Mar 1992 |
| 177 | Humberto Calderón Berti | Carlos Andrés Pérez | 10 Mar 1992 | 12 June 1992 |
| 178 | Fernando Ochoa Antich | Ramón José Velásquez; Carlos Andrés Pérez | 12 Jun 1992 | 2 Feb 1994 |
| 179 | Miguel Ángel Burelli Rivas | Rafael Caldera | 2 Feb 1994 | 2 Feb 1999 |
| 180 | José Vicente Rangel | Hugo Chavez | 2 Feb 1999 | 14 Feb 2001 |
| 181 | Luis Alfonso Dávila | Hugo Chavez | 15 Feb 2001 | 30 May 2002 |
| | José Rodríguez Iturbe | Hugo Chavez | 2002 | 2002 |
| 181 | Luis Alfonso Dávila (2nd term) | Hugo Chavez | 15 Feb 2002 | 30 May 2002 |
| 182 | Roy Chaderton | Hugo Chavez | 30 May 2002 | 13 Jul 2004 |
| 183 | Jesús Pérez | Hugo Chavez | 13 Jul 2004 | 20 Nov 2004 |
| 184 | Alí Rodríguez Araque | Hugo Chavez | 20 Nov 2004 | 7 Aug 2006 |
| 185 | Nicolás Maduro | Hugo Chavez | 9 Aug 2006 | 16 Jan 2013 |
| 186 | Elías Jaua | Hugo Chavez | 16 Jan 2013 | 5 Mar 2013 |
| 187 | Elías Jaua (2nd term) | Nicolás Maduro | 5 Mar 2013 | 2 Sep 2014 |
| 188 | Rafael Ramírez | Nicolás Maduro | 2 Sep 2014 | 25 Dec 2014 |
| 189 | Delcy Rodríguez | Nicolás Maduro | 26 Dec 2014 | 21 June 2017 |
| 190 | Samuel Moncada | Nicolás Maduro | 21 Jun 2017 | 2 Aug 2017 |
| 191 | Jorge Arreaza | Nicolás Maduro | 2 Aug 2017 | 20 Aug 2021 |
| 192 | Félix Plasencia | Nicolás Maduro | 20 Aug 2021 | 16 May 2022 |
| 193 | Carlos Faría | Nicolás Maduro | 16 May 2022 | 6 Jan 2023 |
| 194 | Yván Gil | Nicolás Maduro | 6 Jan 2023 | 13 July 2026 |
| 195 | Félix Plasencia | Delcy Rodríguez | 14 July 2026 | 29 October 2026 |
| 196 | Oliver Blanco | Delcy Rodríguez | 29 October 2026 | Incumbent |

== Gallery ==
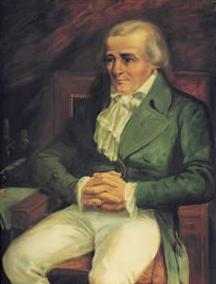
Juan Germán Roscio

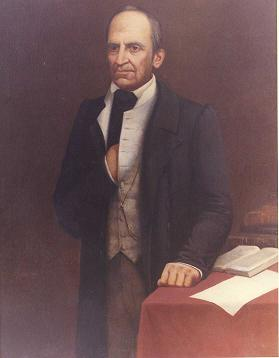
Pedro Gual

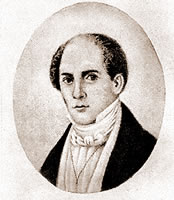
Santos Michelena

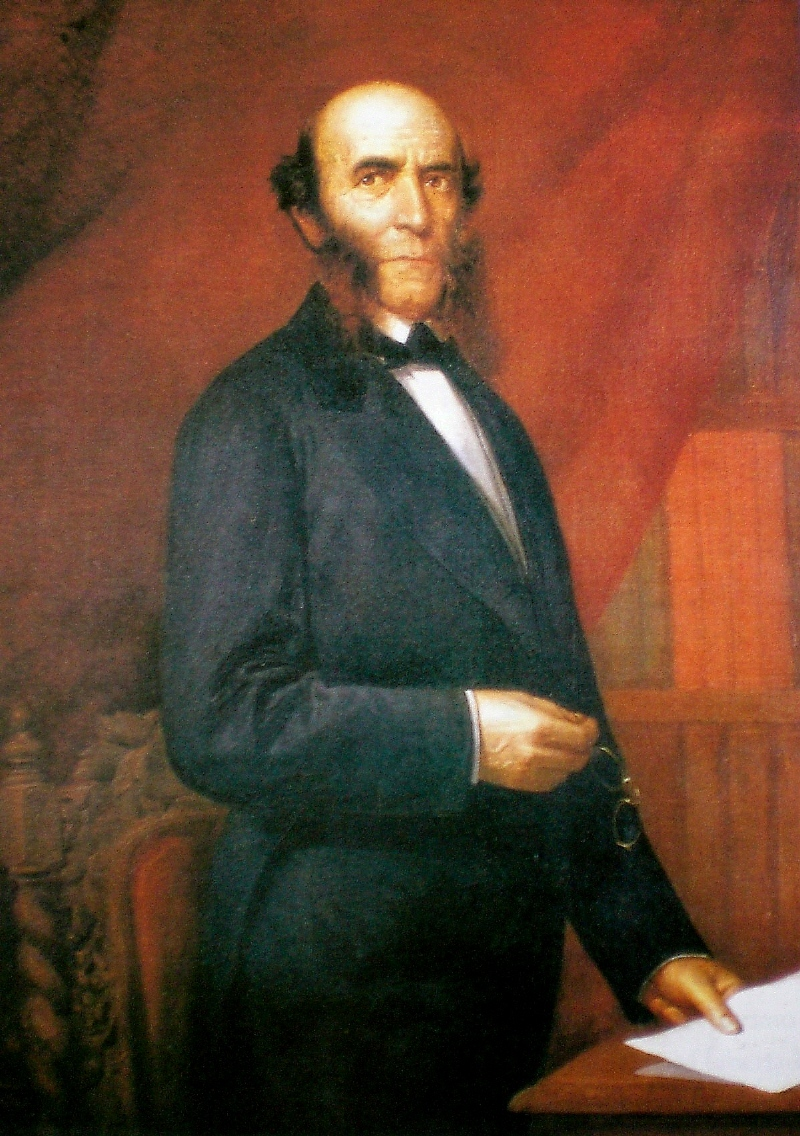
Antonio Leocadio Guzmán

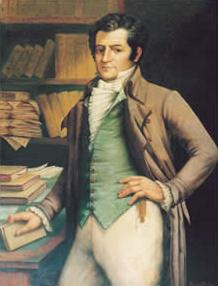
Diego Bautista Urbaneja

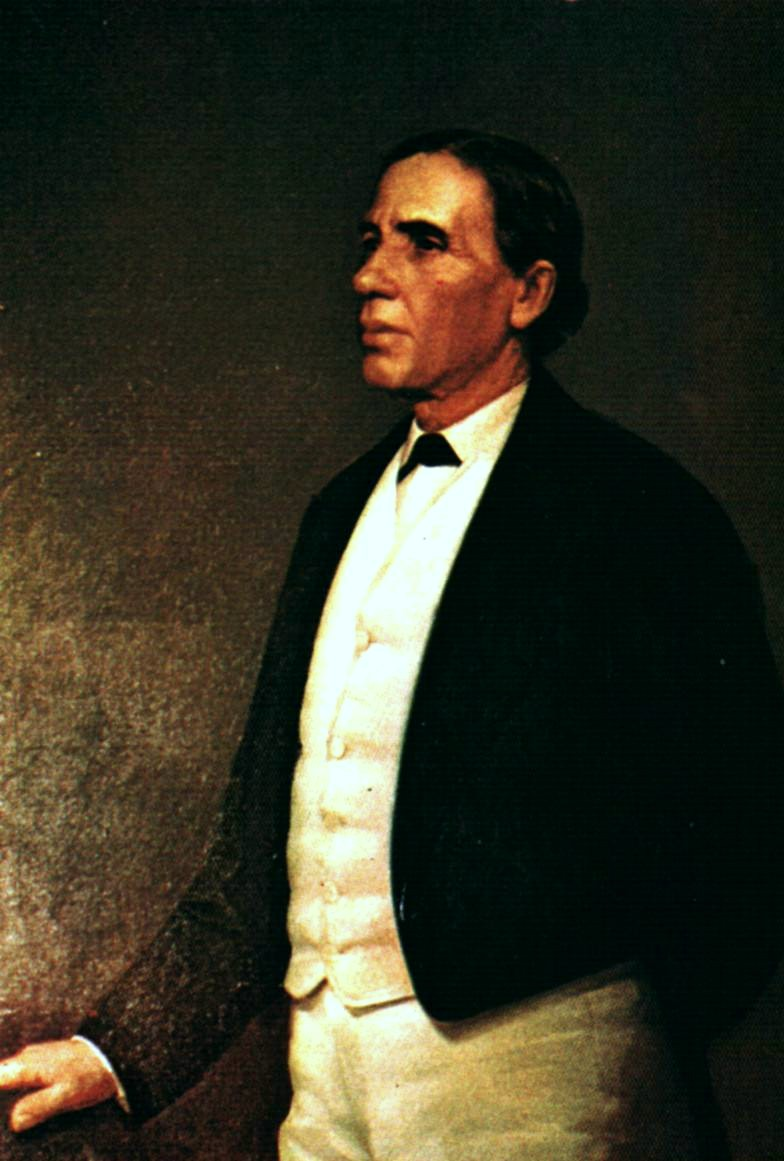
Wenceslao Urrutia

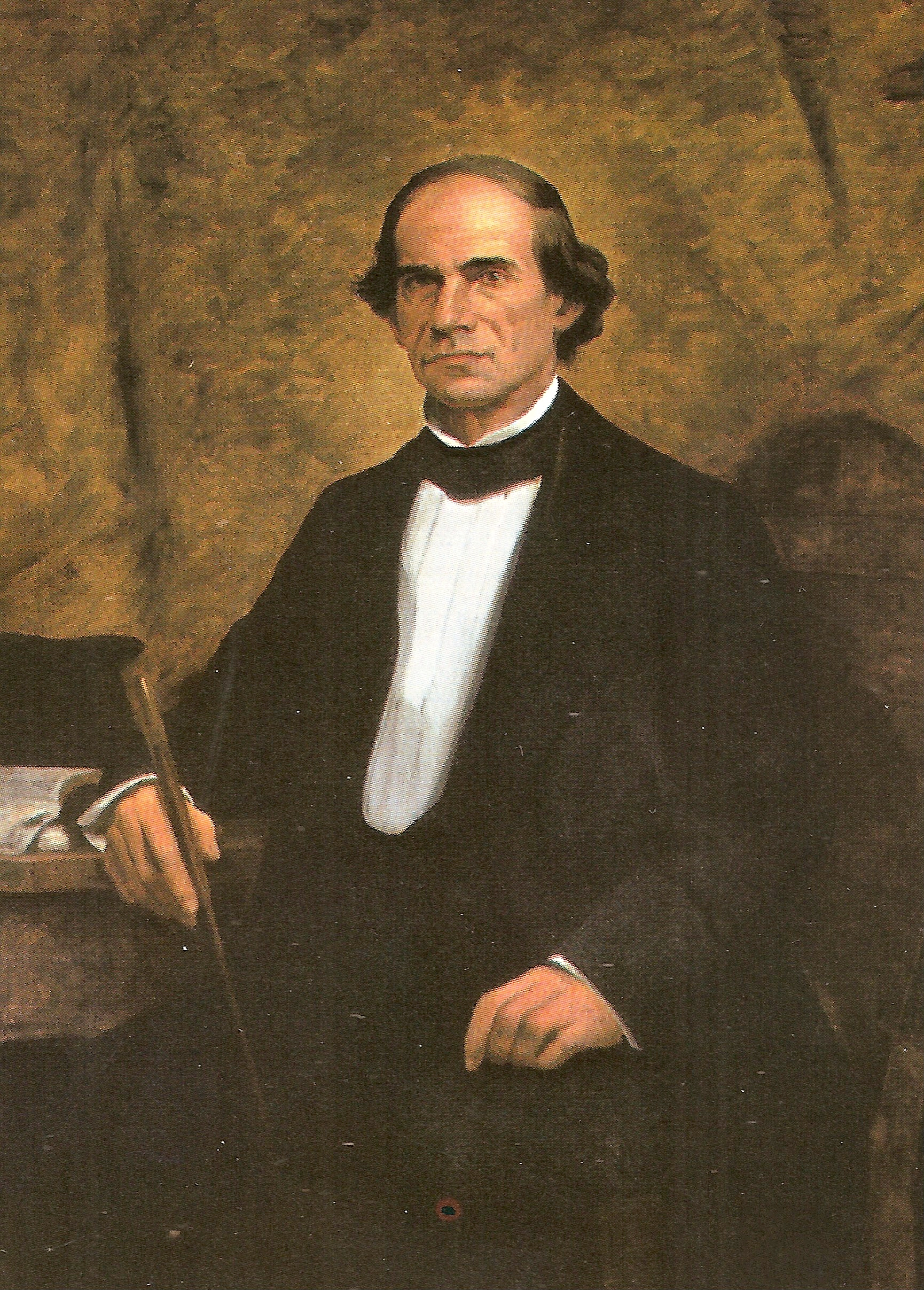
Fermín Toro

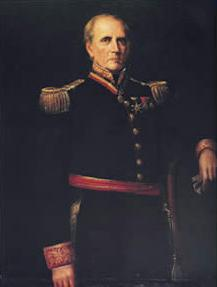
Carlos Soublette

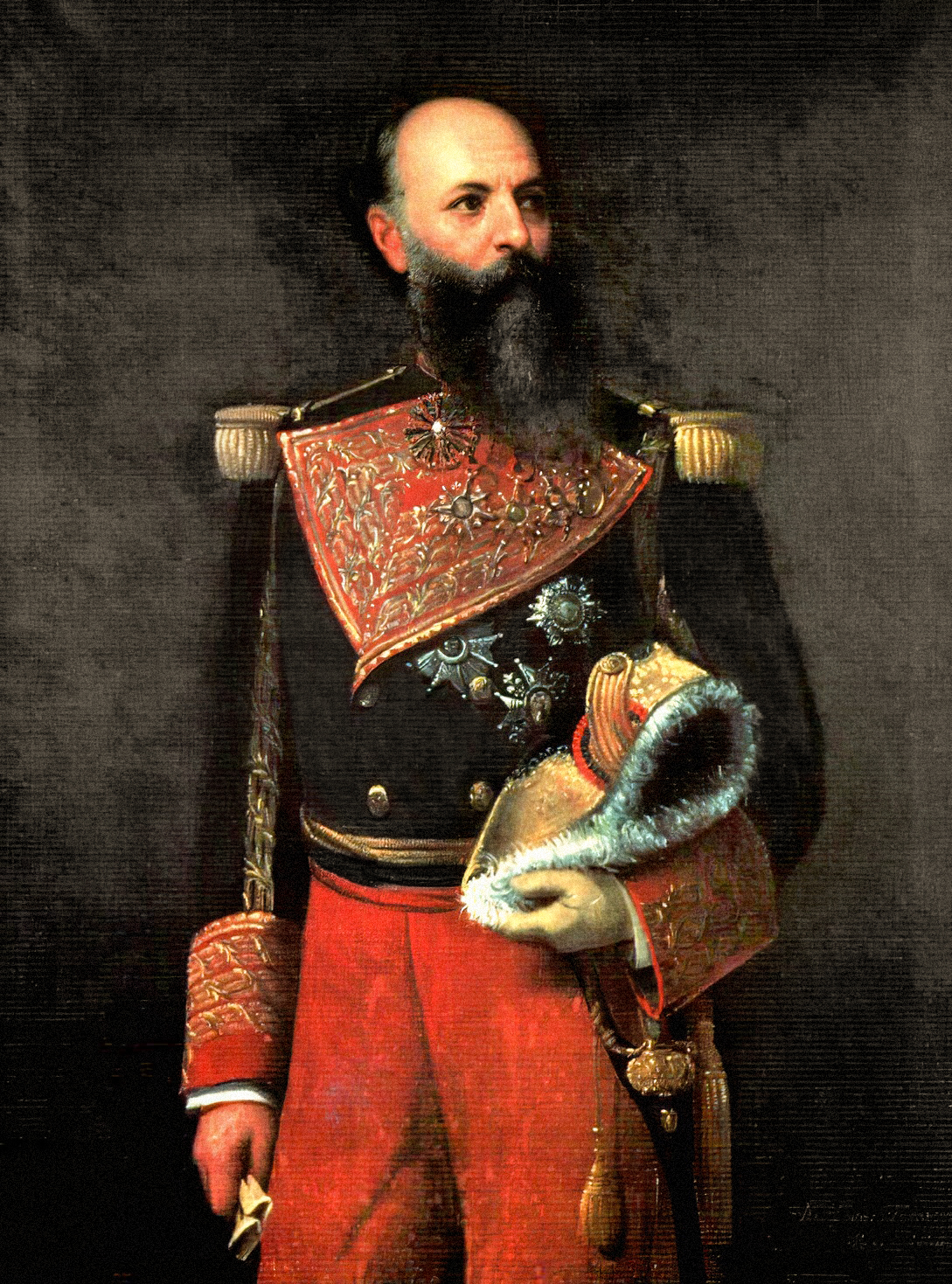
Antonio Guzmán Blanco

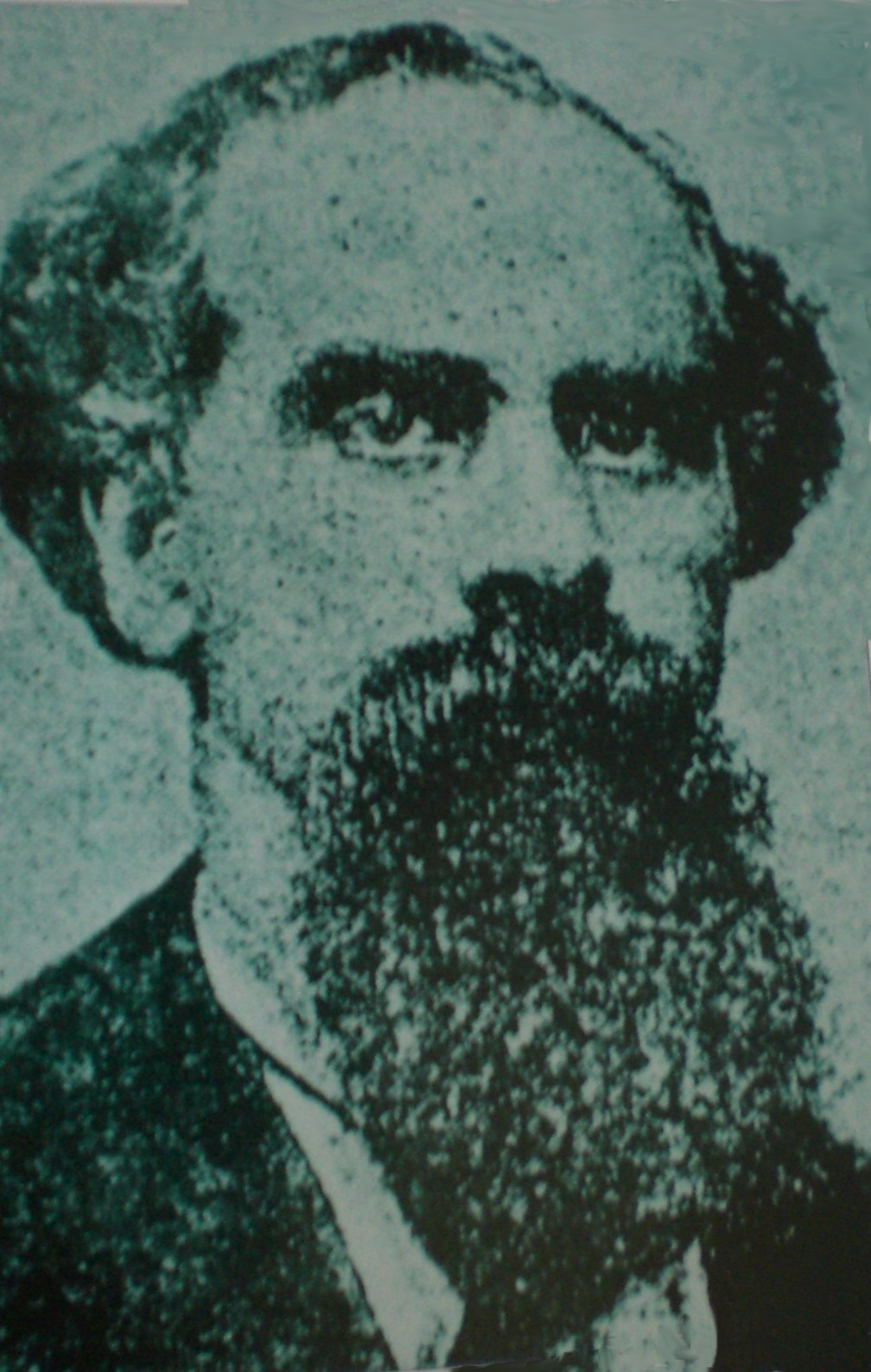
Guillermo Tell Villegas

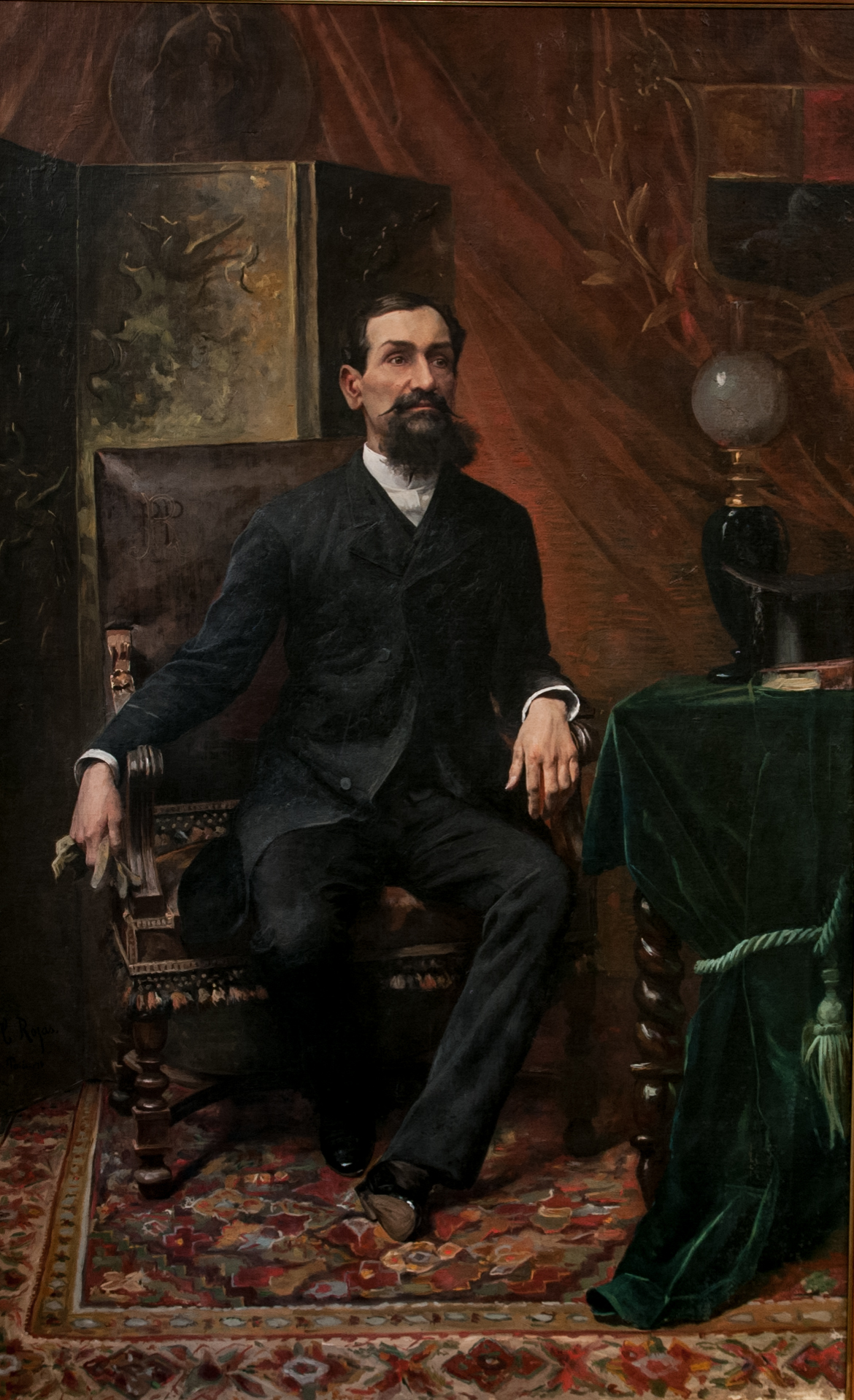
Juan Pablo Rojas Paúl

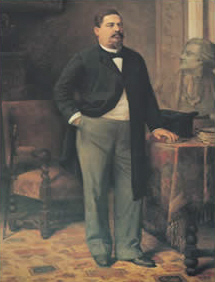
Raimundo Andueza Palacio

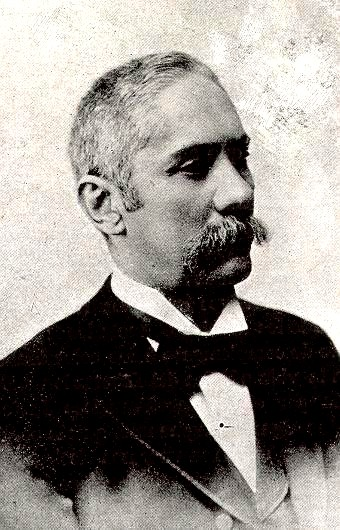
Francisco González Guinán

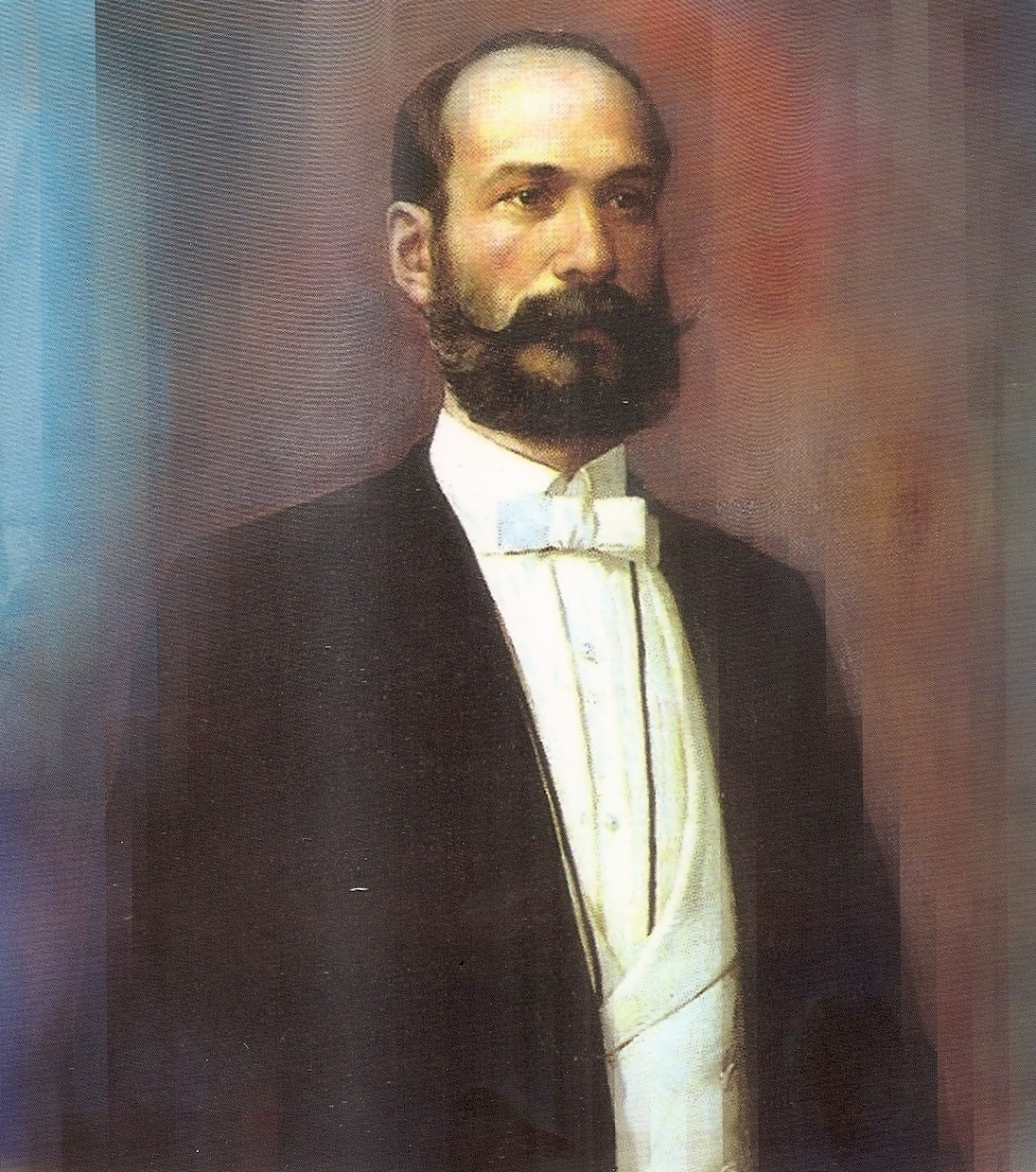
Manuel Antonio Matos

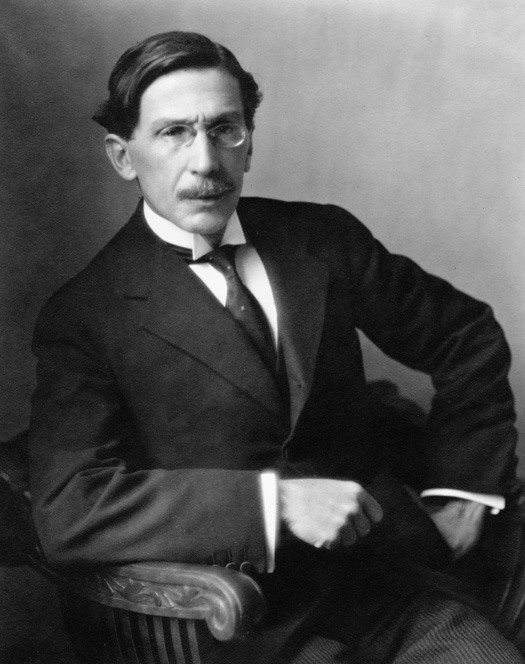
Manuel Díaz Rodríguez

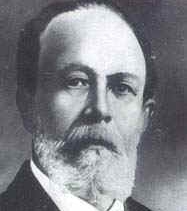
Ignacio Andrade

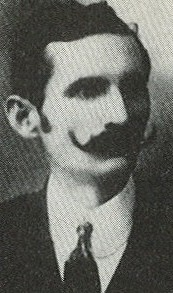
Pedro Itriago Chacín

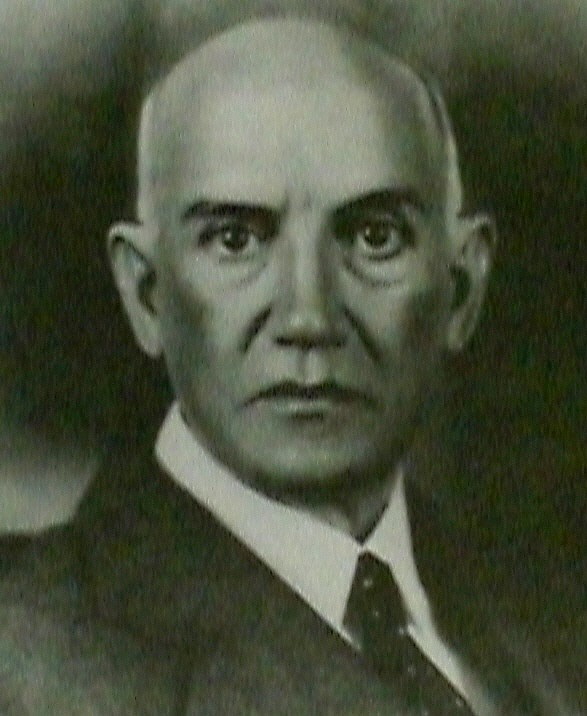
Esteban Gil Borges

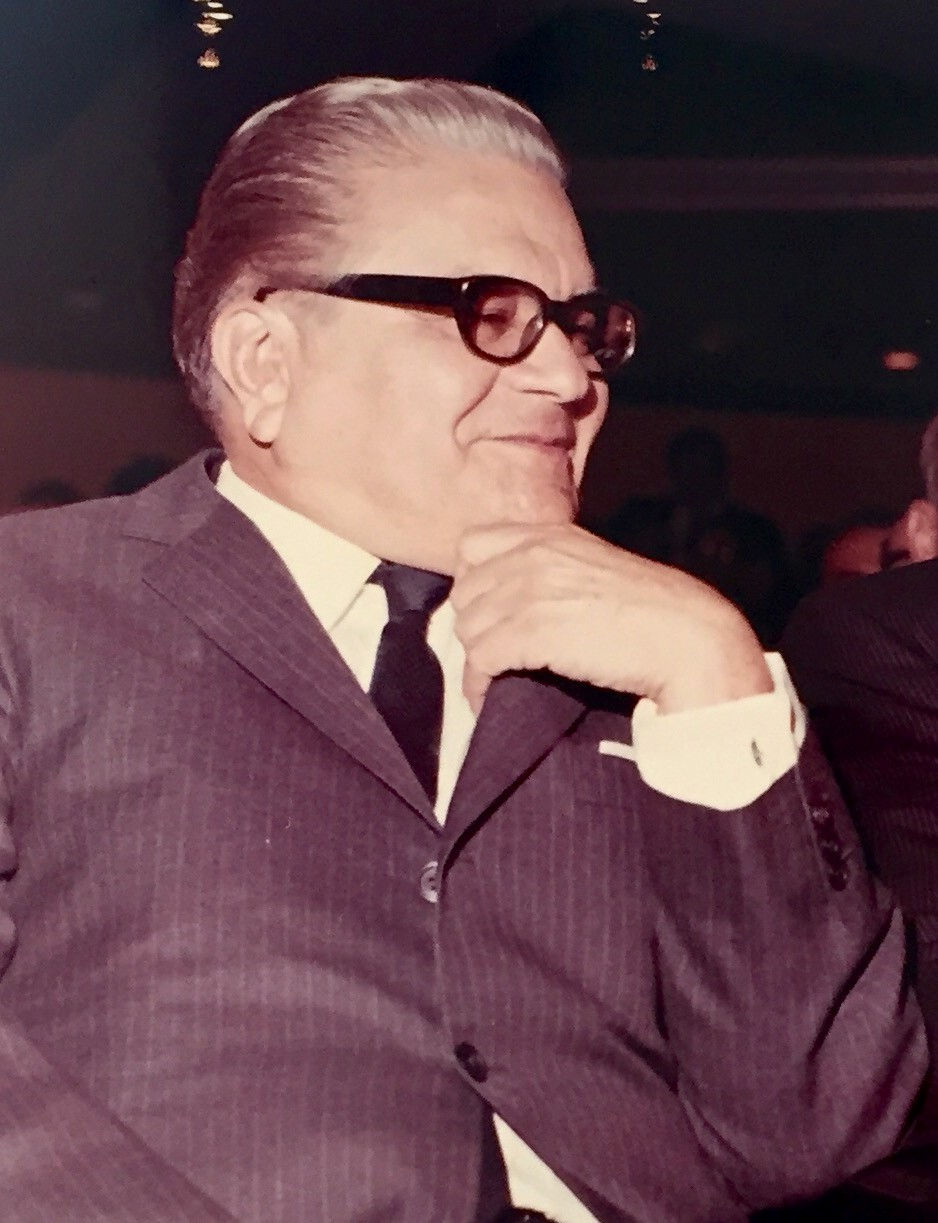
Gonzalo Barrios

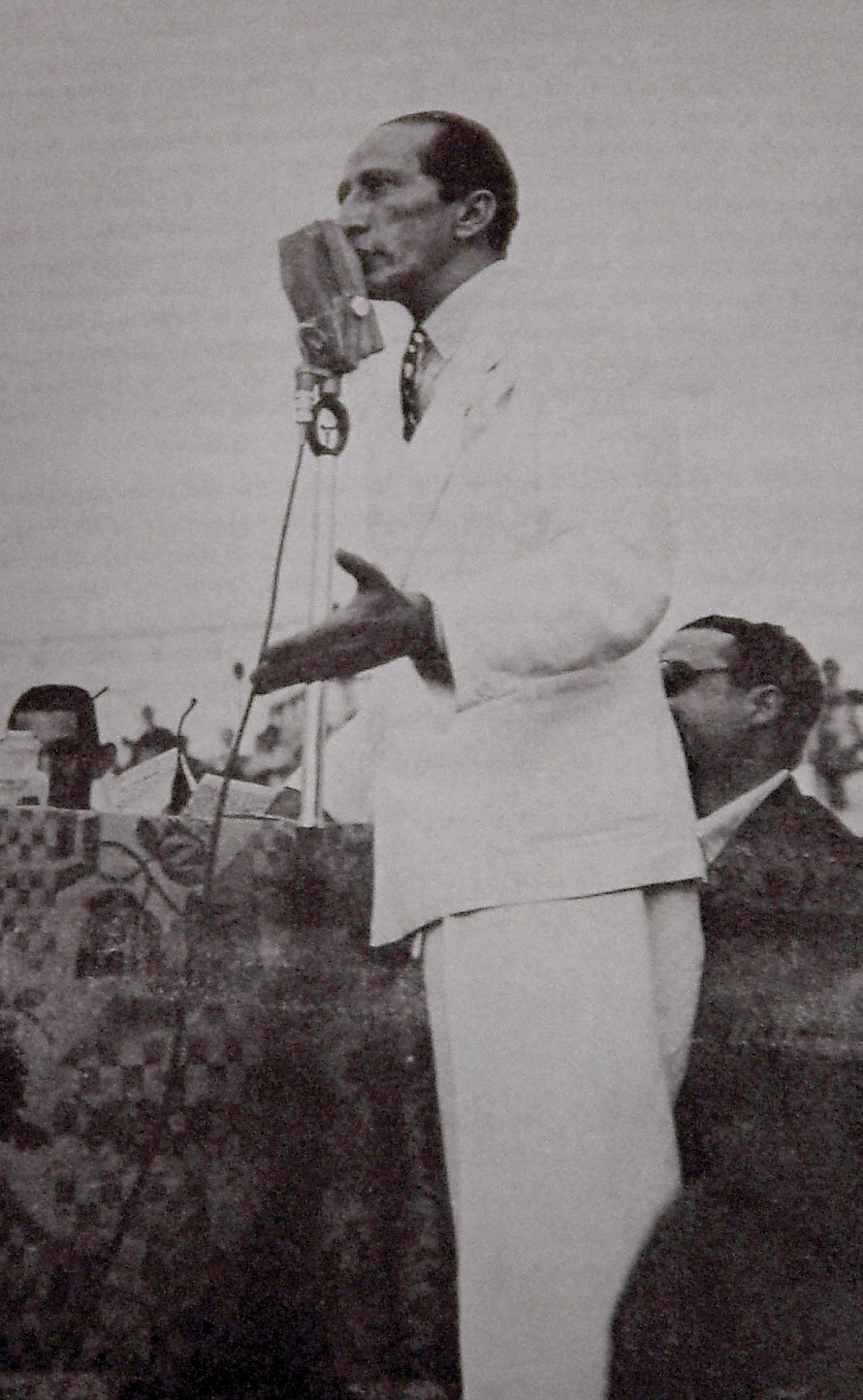
Andrés Eloy Blanco

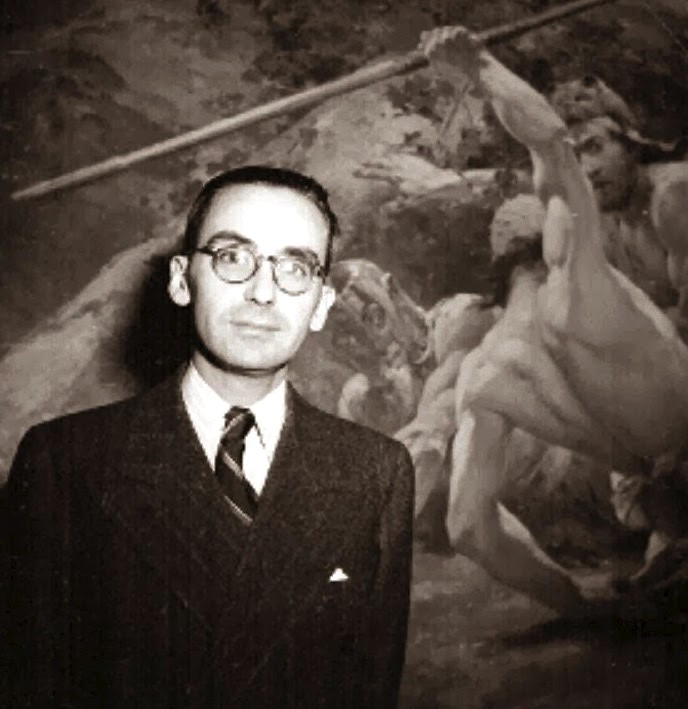
Luis Emilio Gómez Ruiz

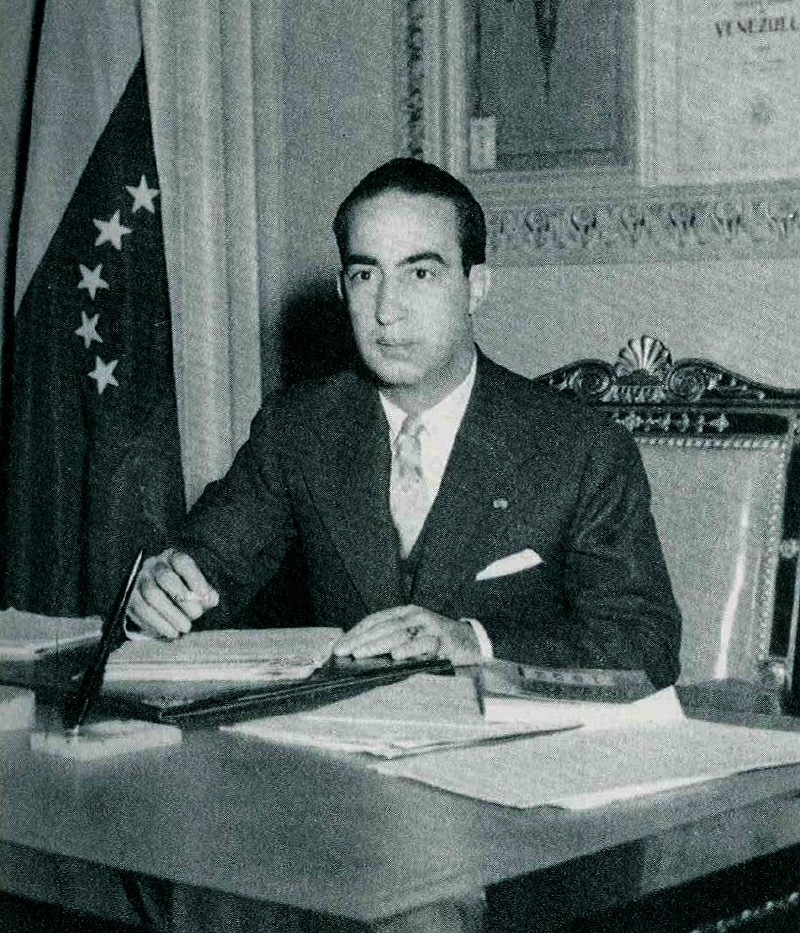
Germán Suárez Flamerich

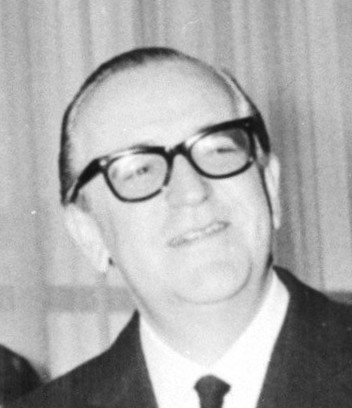
Ignacio Iribarren Borges

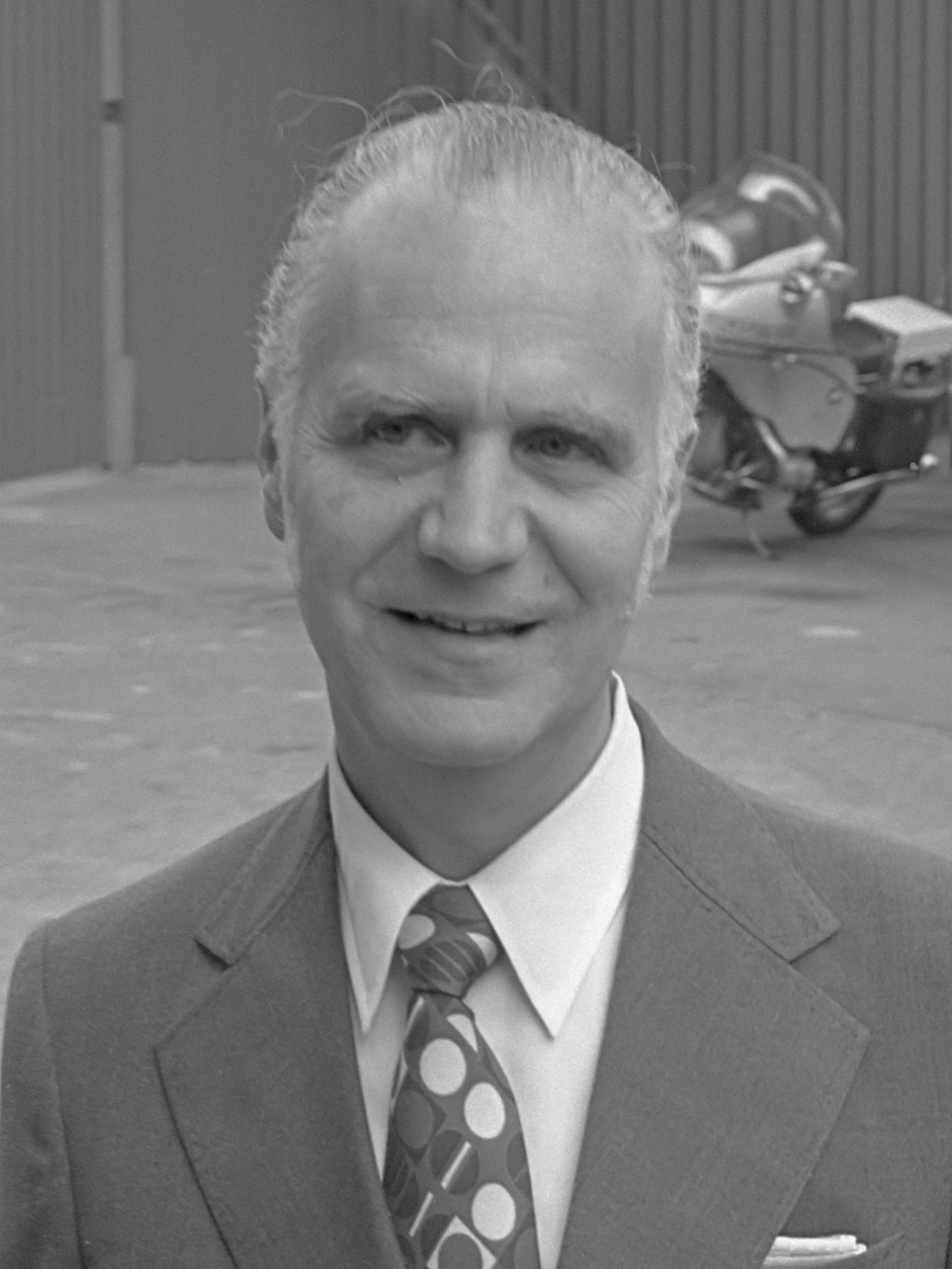
Aristides Calvani

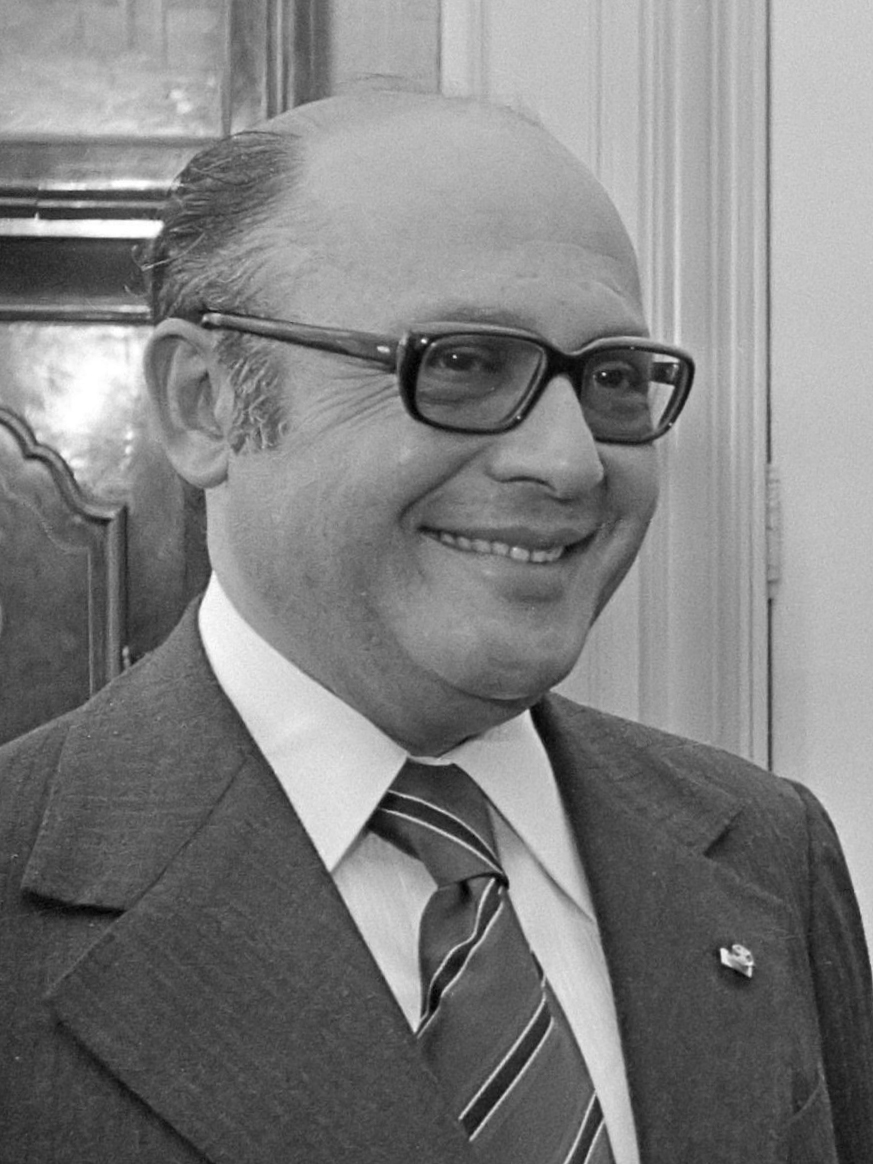
Ramón Escovar Salom

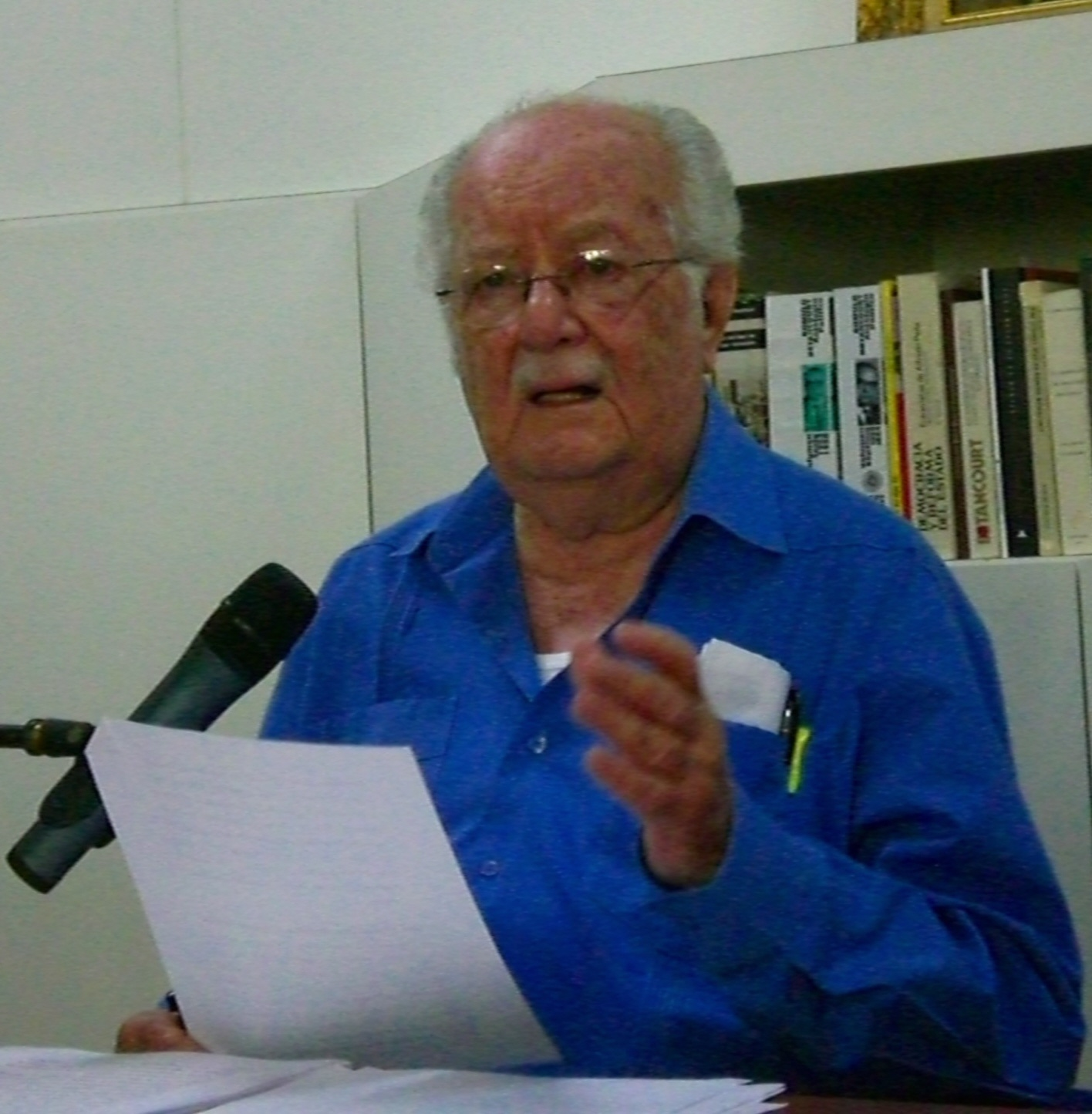
Simón Alberto Consalvi

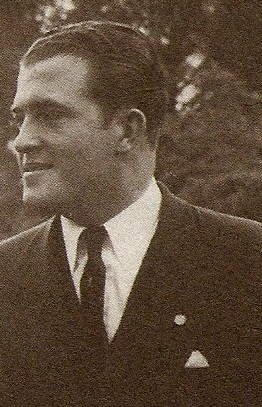
Miguel Ángel Burelli Rivas

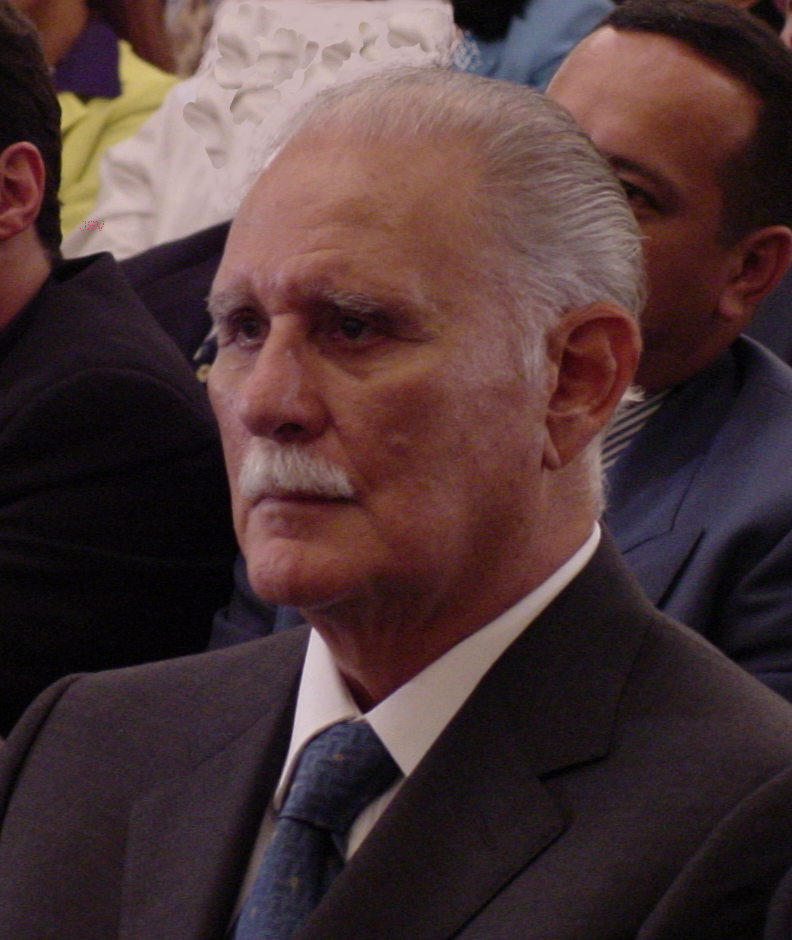
José Vicente Rangel

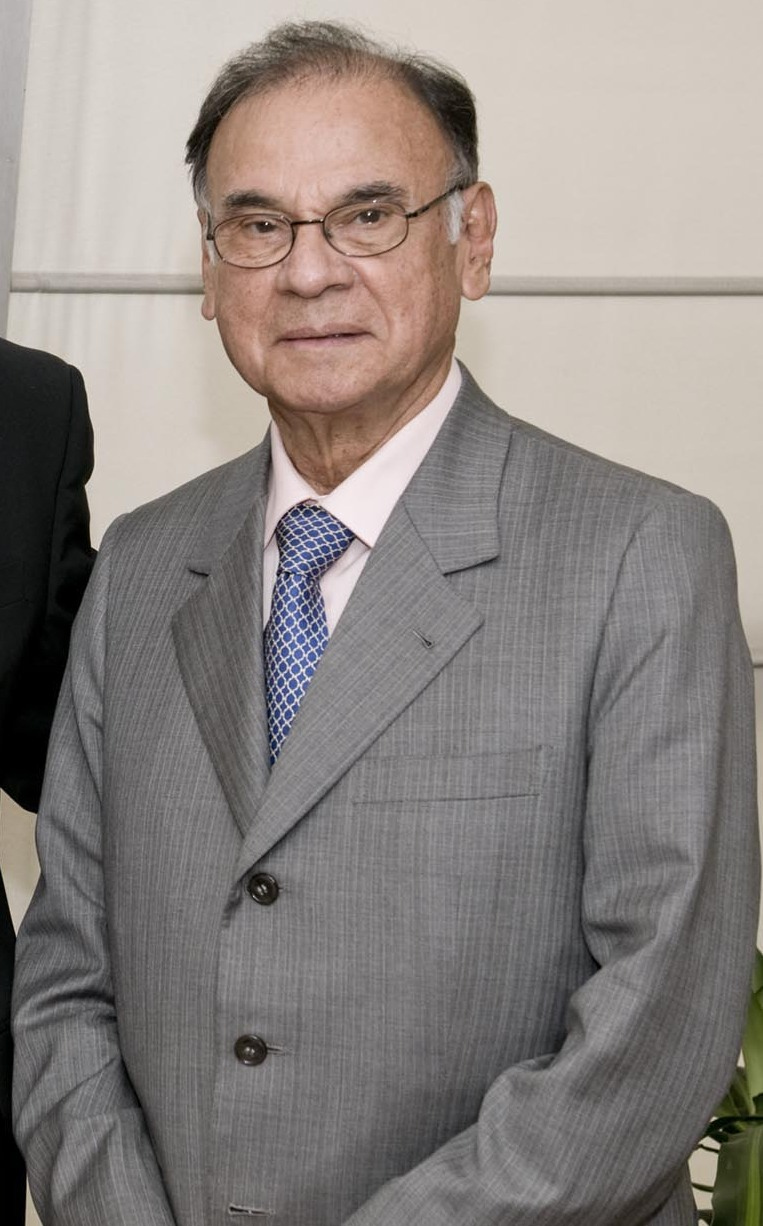
Alí Rodríguez Araque

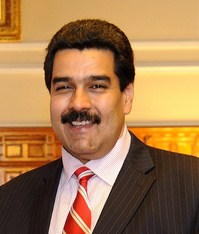
Nicolás Maduro

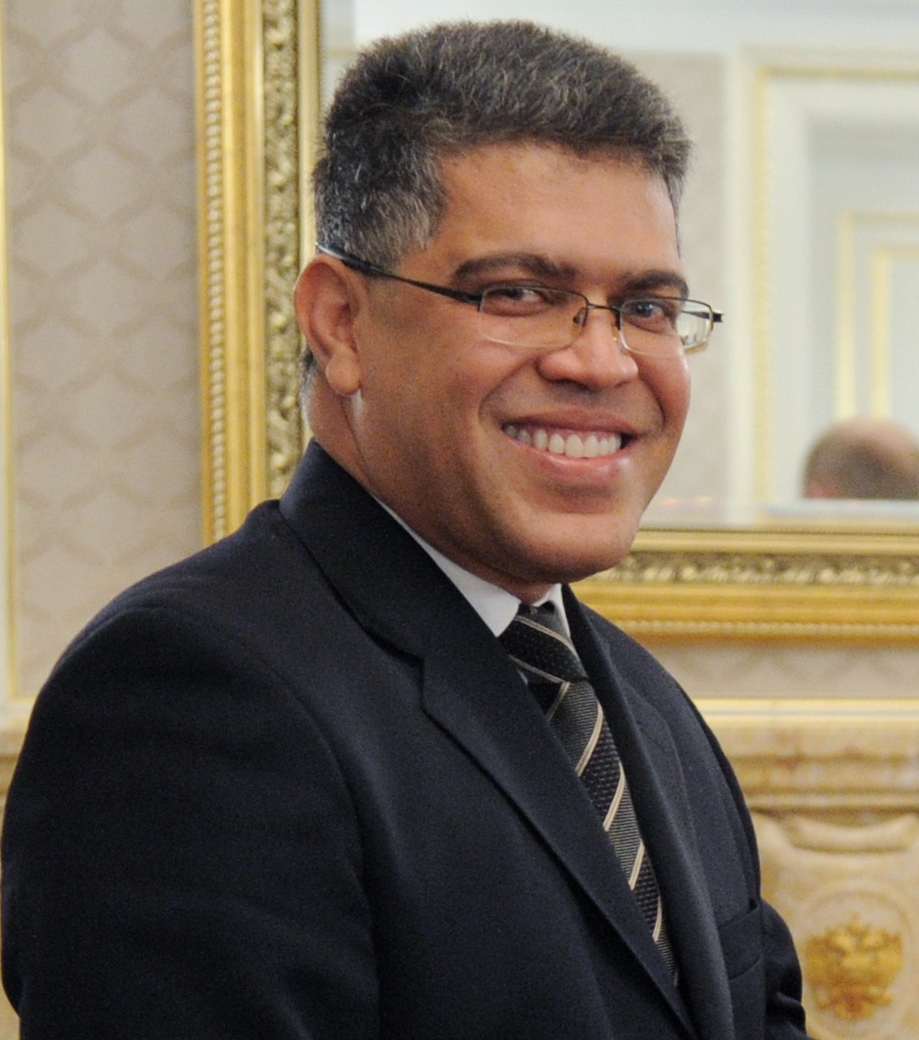
Elias Jaua Milano

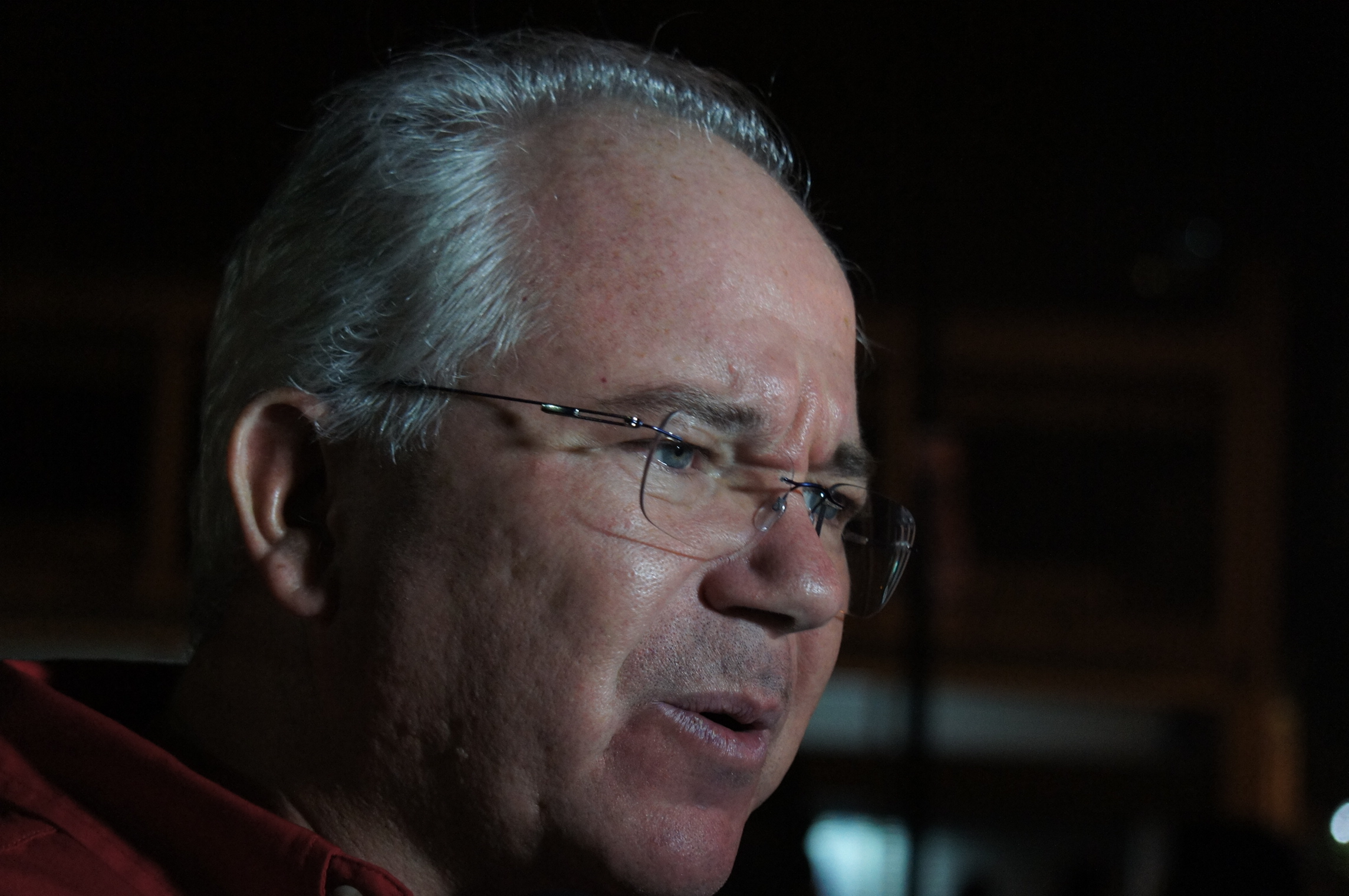
Rafael Ramírez

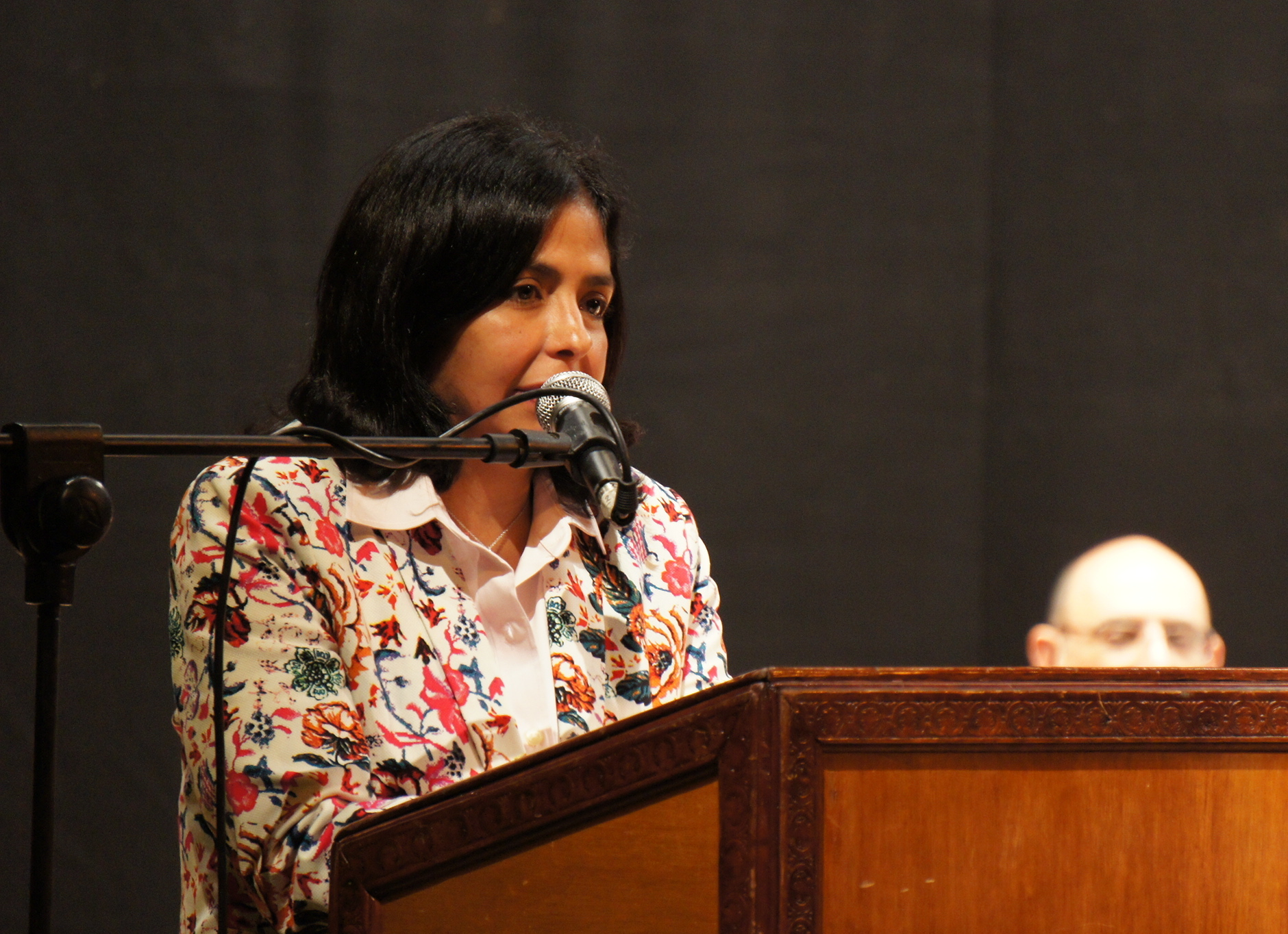
Delcy Rodríguez

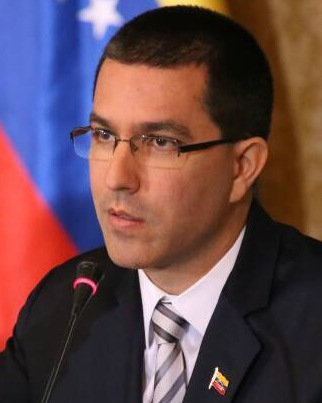
Jorge Arreaza

== See also ==
- List of current foreign ministers
- List of presidents of Venezuela
- Foreign policy of Venezuela
- Ministry of Foreign Affairs (Venezuela)

== Sources ==
- Rulers.org – Foreign ministers S–Z
