= Raimundo Andueza Palacio =

President of Venezuela (1846–1900)

Raimundo Andueza
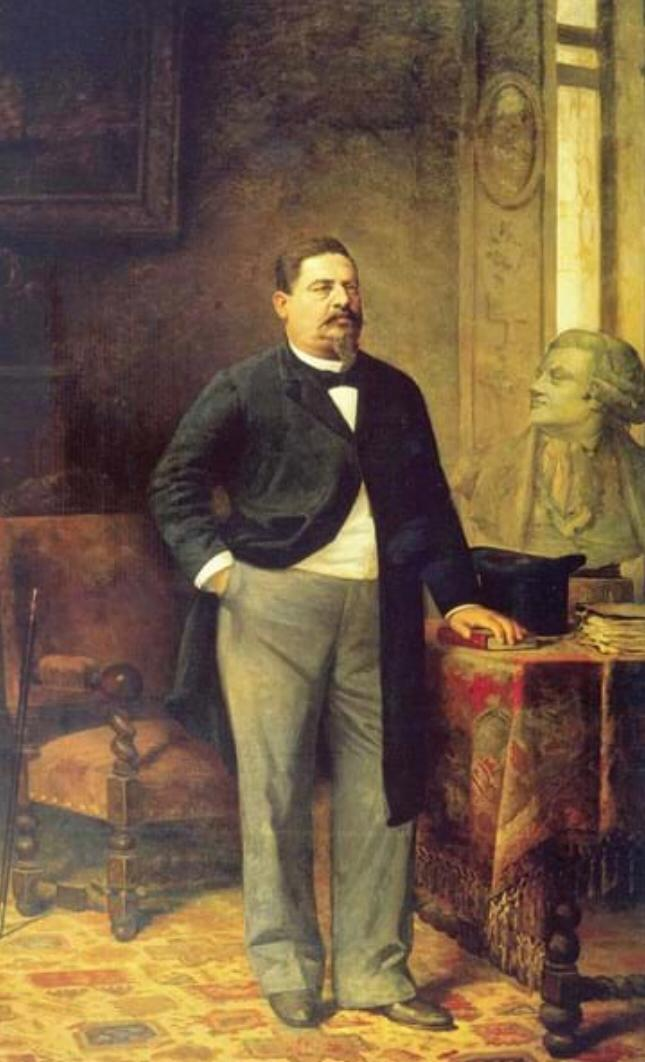

27th President of Venezuela
- In office 19 March 1890 – 17 June 1892
- Preceded by: Juan Pablo Rojas
- Succeeded by: Guillermo Tell Villegas

Minister of Foreign Affairs of Venezuela
- In office 3 March 1877 – 24 November 1877
- President: Francisco Linares Alcántara
- In office 23 October 1899 – 30 July 1900
- President: Cipriano Castro

Personal details
- Born: 6 February 1846 Guanare, Portuguesa, State of Venezuela
- Died: 17 August 1900 (aged 54) Caracas, United States of Venezuela
- Resting place: Southern General Cemetery
- Party: Liberal Party
- Spouse: Isabel González Esteves
- Children: Isabel María Andueza; Ana Teresa Andueza; Raimundo Andueza
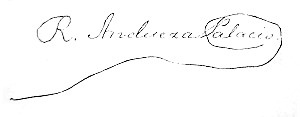
- Signature

Raimundo Ignacio Andueza Palacio (6 February 1846 – 17 August 1900), was the president of Venezuela (1890–1892). He also served twice as his country's Minister of Foreign Affairs.

A member of the Liberal Party, Andueza entered politics as deputy for Aragua. He was the Minister of Finance from 1877 to 1878.

== Political career ==
=== Presidency and the Legalist Revolution ===
He became president on 7 March 1890, taking up residence in the Yellow House. He left office under duress. His presidential term was due to end in 1892, but he tried to extend it, resulting in resistance known as the Legalist Revolution. He stepped down on 17 June 1892 under pressure from the armed intervention of General Joaquín Crespo.

=== Minister of Foreign Affairs ===
Andueza went into exile, not returning until after Crespo's death in 1898. He served as Minister of Foreign Affairs under Cipriano Castro from 1899 to 1900, the year of his death.

== Personal life ==
He was born in Guanare, Portuguesa state, 6 February 1846, son of Raimundo Andueza and Carolina Palacio. Cousin of Venezuelan President Victorino Marquez Bustillos.

Palacio was married to Isabel González Esteves, who served as First Lady of Venezuela from 1890 until 1892.

He died in Caracas, 17 August 1900 and was buried in the city's Southern General Cemetery.

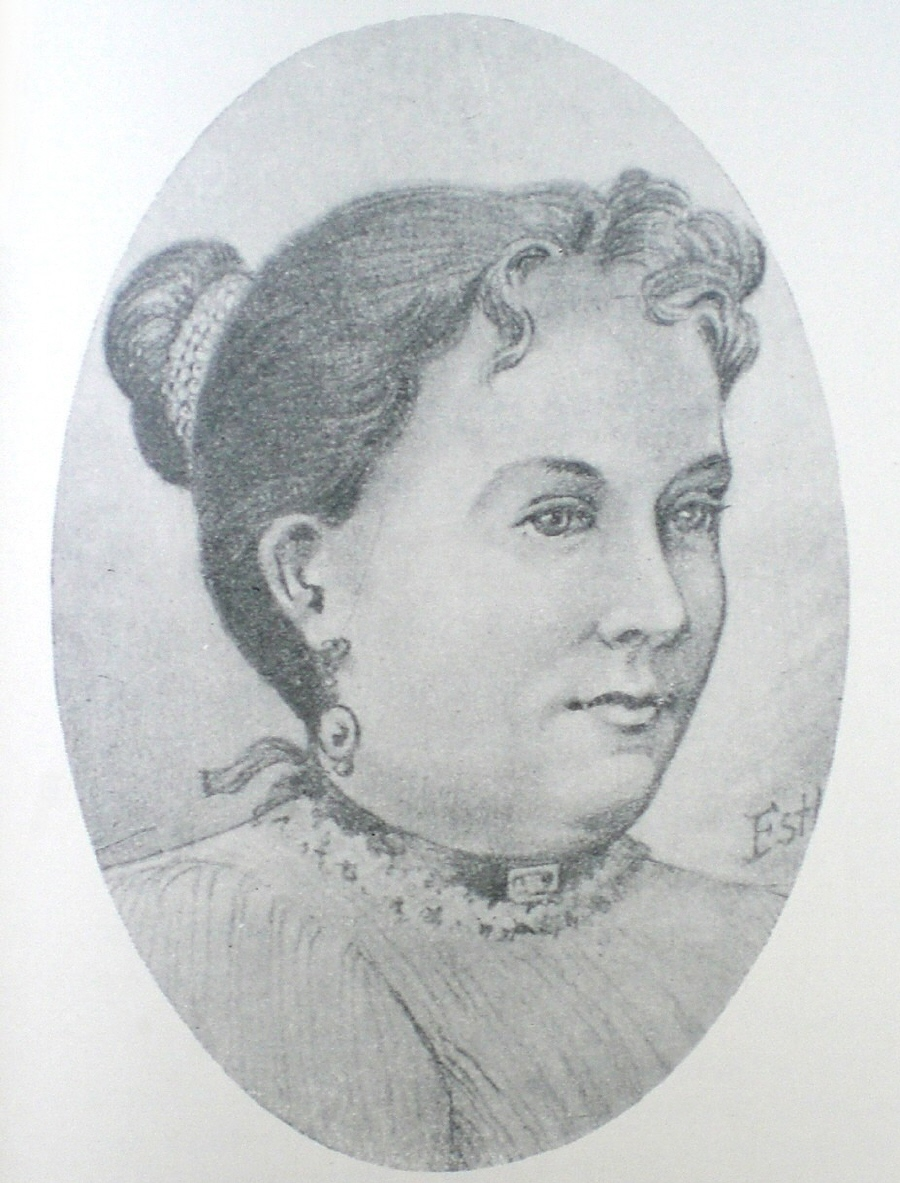
Isabel González Esteves

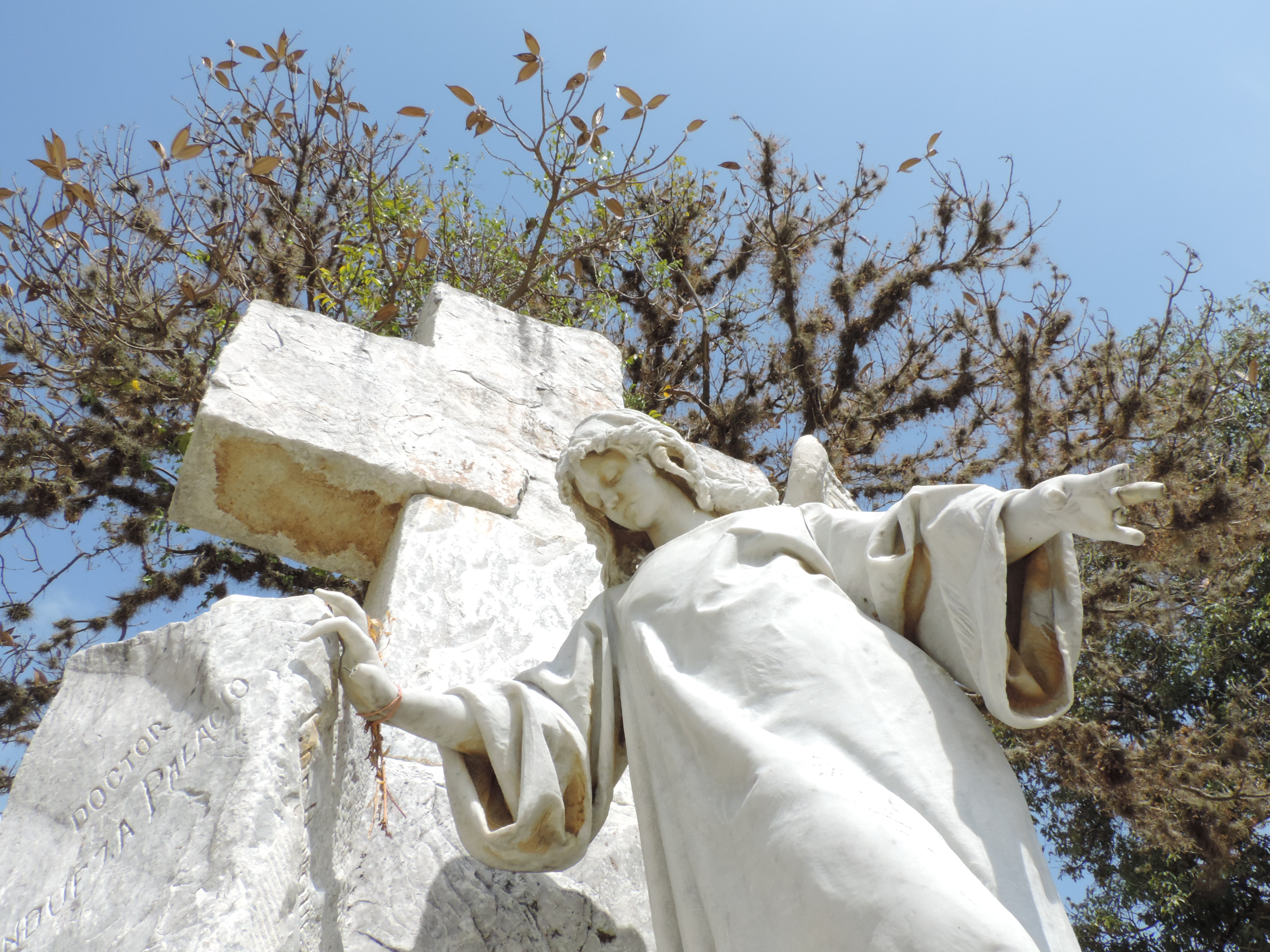
Tomb

== See also ==
- President of Venezuela
- List of ministers of foreign affairs of Venezuela
- Legalist Revolution

Political offices
Preceded by Juan Pablo Rojas	President of Venezuela; 1890–1892	Succeeded by Guillermo Tell Villegas
Preceded by Eduardo Calcaño	92nd Minister of Foreign Affairs of Venezuela; 3 March 1877-24 November 1877	Succeeded by Marco Antonio Saluzzo
Preceded by Manuel Clemente Urbaneja	125th Minister of Foreign Affairs of Venezuela; 23 October 1899 – 30 July 1900	Succeeded by Eduardo Blanco
