= Carlos Faría =

Venezuelan politician

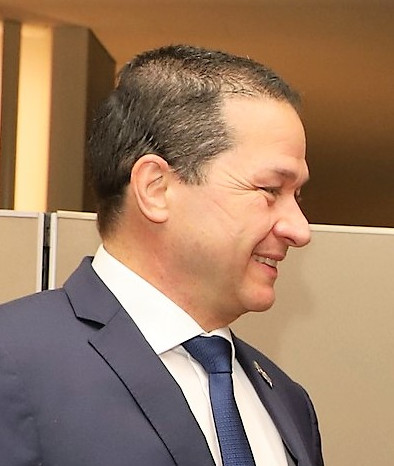

Minister of Foreign Affairs
- In office 16 May 2022 – 6 January 2023
- President: Nicolás Maduro
- Preceded by: Felix Plasencia
- Succeeded by: Yván Gil

Personal details
- Born: Carlos Rafael Faría Tortosa; 11 December 1962 (age 63) Caracas, Venezuela
- Party: United Socialist Party of Venezuela (PSUV)
- Education: Kharkiv Polytechnic Institute

Carlos Rafael Faría Tortosa (born December 11, 1962, in Caracas) is a Venezuelan politician who served as Venezuela's Minister of Foreign Affairs from 2022 to 2023. Previously, he served as Venezuela's Ambassador to Russia from June 7, 2017, to May 16, 2022. He was also Minister of Industry and Commerce, appointed by president Nicolás Maduro on national radio and television on August 2, 2016, replacing Miguel Pérez Abad.

== Biography ==
Son of the late communist leader Jesús Faría and Elizabeth Tortosa, he is the brother of politician Jesús Faría Tortosa. He graduated cum laude from Kharkiv Polytechnic Institute then in the Ukrainian SSR of the Soviet Union, in 1987, with a degree in Mechanical Engineering, majoring in Machinery, Tools, and Instrument Construction Technology.

He has thirty years of experience managing plants in the graphic arts (printing), plastics, electrical, metalworking, and mass consumer products industries, as well as in industrial maintenance and project development.

He is a member of a family of political leaders, such as his father, Jesús Faría, who was a communist party leader, and his brother, Jesús Faría Tortosa.

From February 1992 to January 1995, he served as Production Manager at Cromotip, C.A., a graphic arts company in Venezuela. Then, between August 1995 and May 1996, he held the position of Plant Manager and Sales Manager at C.A.Induesca, in Caracas, and from June 1996 to March 1997 he worked as a Plant Engineer at Same's de Venezuela, also in the capital city.

From June 2008 to November 2009, he served as Technical Assistance and Monitoring Manager at the Strategic Fund for Joint Development of Venezuela and Belarus in Caracas. Subsequently, between November 2009 and January 2010, he served as Production Manager at the Venezuela-Belarus Joint Enterprise for the Manufacturing of Construction Materials in Caracas.

Furthermore, from March to July 2010, he was Director General of Monitoring and Control of Strategic Projects at the Ministry of Science, Technology, and Intermediate Industries, where he also served as Vice Minister of Light and Intermediate Industries from August 2010 to August 2016. From August 2016 to February 2017, he served as Sectoral Vice President of the Economy and Minister of Industry and Commerce.

On May 6, 2015, he was appointed principal director of the board of directors of Complejo Siderúrgico Nacional, S.A. (CSN). Three months later, on August 8, 2014, he was appointed principal director of the board of directors of Industria Venezolana de Cemento, S.A. (Invecem).

On October 4, 2015, he was principal director of the board of directors of Planta de Autobuses Yutong Venezuela, S.A., a company whose corporate purpose includes: "The economic activity of the automotive industry, especially the production, assembly, distribution, marketing, industrialization, research, and development of buses and other public land passenger transportation vehicles."

On December 3, 2015, according to Official Gazette No. 40,804, he was appointed president of Corporación Socialista del Sector Automotor C.A.

On August 2, 2016, in accordance with Official Gazette No. 40,975, he was appointed Minister of Industry and Commerce. Three days later, on August 5 of that year, he was appointed Vice President of the Economy Sector.

On December 22, 2017, he was appointed Head of the Permanent Mission at the Venezuelan Embassy in the Holy See (Vatican City). Almost three months later, he was appointed Head of the Advance Fund of the Venezuelan Embassy in Belarus.

From January 2015 to March 2017, he served as Executive Secretary of the Venezuelan side of the Venezuela-Russia High-Level Intergovernmental Commission (CIAN). He then served as Ambassador Extraordinary and Plenipotentiary of Venezuela to the Russian Federation from February 2017 to May 2022.

In 2022 he was appointed as Minister of Foreign Affairs of Venezuela. In a meeting with Russian Foreign Minister Sergei Lavrov, he was awarded the Order of Friendship. In September 2022 he met Chinese Foreign Minister, Wang Yi.
