= Jorge Arreaza =

Venezuelan politician (born 1973)

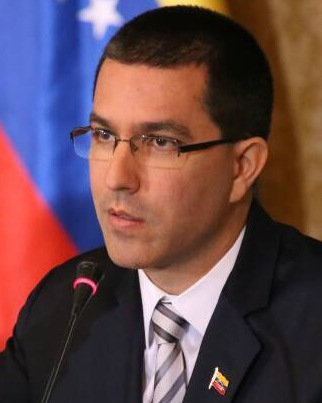
- Arreaza in 2017

Deputy of the National Assembly of Venezuela
- Incumbent
- Assumed office 5 January 2026
- Constituency: National List

Minister for Communes and Social Movements
- In office 3 March 2022 – 19 February 2024
- President: Nicolás Maduro
- Preceded by: Noris Herrera Rodríguez
- Succeeded by: Guy Vernáez

Minister of Industries and National Production
- In office 19 August 2021 – 8 December 2021
- President: Nicolás Maduro
- Preceded by: Tareck El Aissami
- Succeeded by: José Gregorio Biomorgi

Minister of Foreign Affairs
- In office 2 August 2017 – 19 August 2021
- President: Nicolás Maduro
- Preceded by: Samuel Moncada
- Succeeded by: Felix Plasencia

Minister of Ecological Mining Development
- In office 19 February 2017 – 2 August 2017
- President: Nicolás Maduro
- Preceded by: Roberto Mirabal
- Succeeded by: Victor Cano

Minister of Higher Education, Science and Technology
- In office 8 January 2016 – 4 January 2017
- President: Nicolás Maduro
- Preceded by: Manuel Fernández Meléndez
- Succeeded by: Hugbel Roa

Vice President of Venezuela
- In office 19 April 2013 – 6 January 2016
- President: Nicolás Maduro
- Preceded by: Nicolás Maduro
- Succeeded by: Aristóbulo Istúriz

Minister of Science and Technology
- In office 27 November 2011 – 19 April 2013
- President: Hugo Chávez; Nicolás Maduro
- Preceded by: Office created
- Succeeded by: Manuel Fernández Meléndez

Personal details
- Born: Jorge Alberto Arreaza Montserrat; 6 June 1973 (age 53) Caracas, Republic of Venezuela
- Party: United Socialist Party of Venezuela (PSUV)
- Spouse(s): Rosa Virginia Chavez Colmenares (m. 2007; div. 2017) Germania (m. 2022)
- Education: Central University of Venezuela; University of Cambridge

Jorge Alberto Arreaza Montserrat (Venezuelan Spanish pronunciation: [ˈhoɾhe alˈβeɾto areˈasa monseˈra(t)]; born 6 June 1973) is a Venezuelan politician who has held several important positions in the administration of President Hugo Chávez and his successor Nicolás Maduro. From August 2017 to August 2021, Arreaza served as Venezuela's Minister of Foreign Affairs. Arreaza has been sanctioned by Canada and the United States for his role in the violation of human rights in Venezuela.

== Education and early career ==
Born in Caracas, Arreaza Montserrat received a degree in international studies from the Central University of Venezuela (UCV) and was awarded a scholarship by the Gran Mariscal de Ayacucho Foundation during the 1990s, which allowed him to earn a master's degree in European Policy Studies at University of Cambridge, England. At UCV, he also worked as a journalist and university teacher, in addition to working as an announcer and interviewer on several public television venues in Venezuela, and as host of the television show Diálogo abierto on Venezolana de Televisión.

== Political career ==
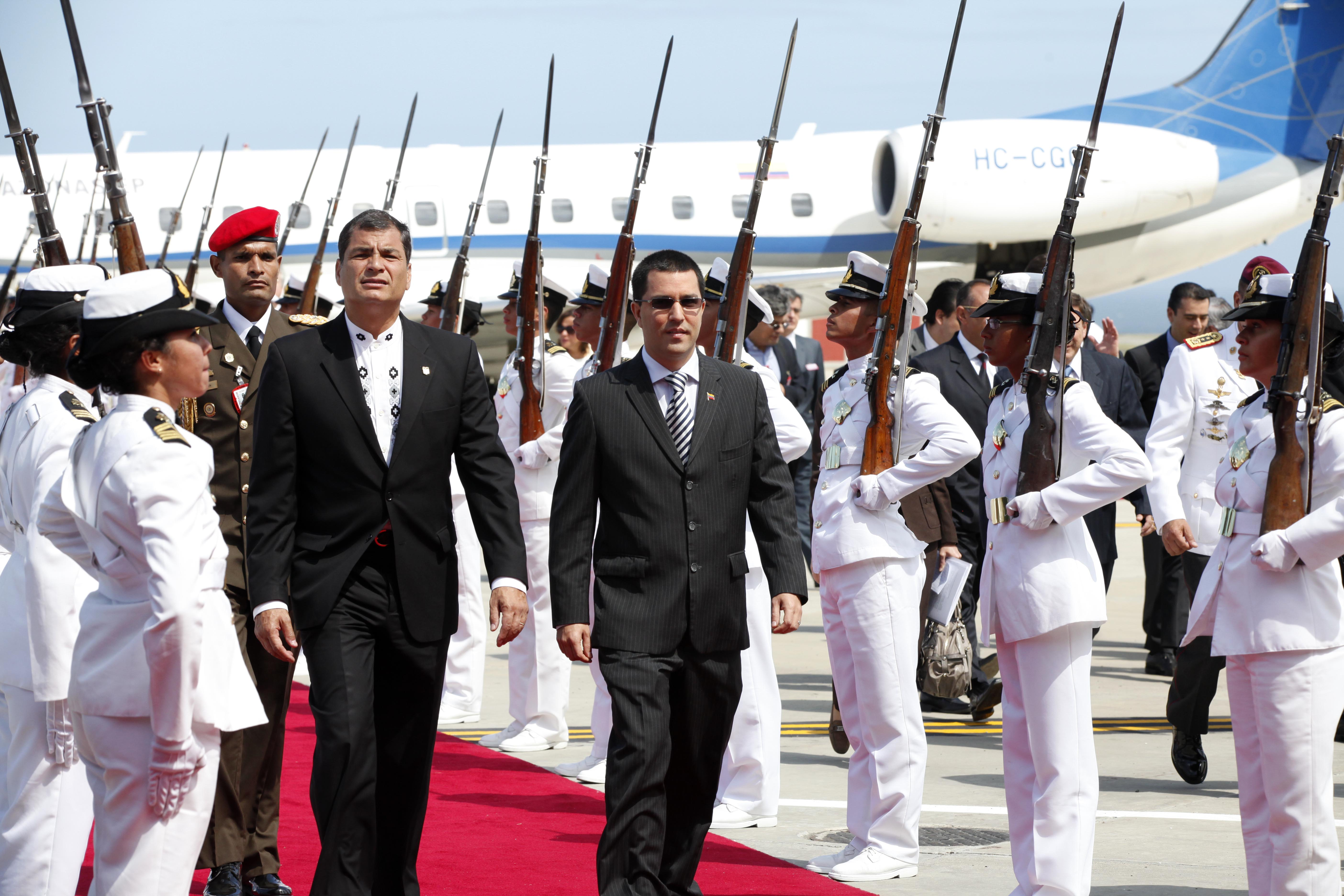
Vice President Arreaza with Ecuadorian President Rafael Correa in December 2013

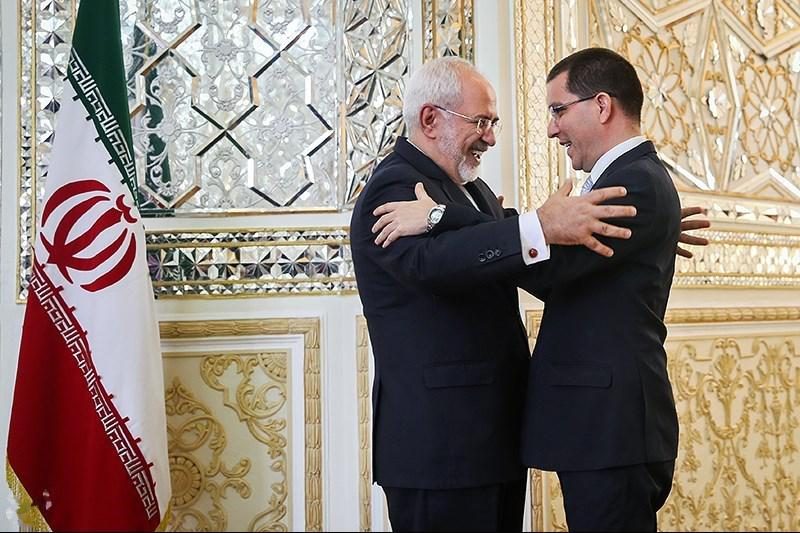
Arreaza with Iran's Foreign Minister Mohammad Javad Zarif in April 2018

Arreaza Montserrat was appointed the vice president of Venezuela and served from 2013 to 2016. He previously served as Minister of Science and Technology from 2011 to 2013 and also served as President of Fundación Gran Mariscal de Ayacucho (FUNDAYACUCHO) from 2005 until December 2009. He became Chavez's son-in-law in 2007, after marrying Chavez's eldest daughter, Rosa Virginia. Throughout the final stages of Chavez's illness, Arreaza served as unofficial spokesman of the Chavez family.

Arreaza has dismissed the opposition criticisms that the government is using the army to promote an ideology, which is against the 1999 constitution, saying "the military are Chávez-militants who will guarantee the socialist model in Venezuela".

On 2 August 2017, after the election of the National Constituent Assembly, President Nicolás Maduro appointed Arreaza as head of the Venezuelan Foreign Ministry, with the mission of retaking the leading role of Venezuela in the world. Arreaza was succeeded as Foreign Minister by Felix Plasencia in August 2021.

== Sanctions ==
=== Canada ===
On 15 April 2019, Canada announced that sanctions on 43 individuals were applied on 12 April based on the Special Economic Measures Act. The government statement said "the sanctions hit high ranking officials of the Maduro regime, regional governors, and people directly implicated in activities undermining democratic institutions". Foreign Minister Chrystia Freeland stated, "The Maduro dictatorship must be held accountable for this crisis and depriving Venezuelans of their most basic rights and needs. Canada is committed to supporting the peaceful restoration of constitutional democracy in Venezuela."

The newly sanctioned Venezuelans included Arreaza. In response, his ministry has accused Canada of supporting Trump's "war adventure" and said that Prime Minister Justin Trudeau "has invalidated Canada as a reliable actor in dialogue."

=== United States ===
The United States sanctioned Arreaza along with Judge Carol Bealexis Padilla de Arretureta on 26 April 2019 as they were determined to be current or former officials of the Government of Venezuela. Both were accused of exploiting the U.S. financial system to support the “illegitimate” regime of Nicolas Maduro. The U.S. Department of State issued a statement describing Arreaza as being "at the forefront" of the Maduro administration attempts "to thwart the democratic aspirations of the Venezuelan people."

Hours later, Arreaza responded that the sanctions "gives us more strength for the struggle." He further elaborated saying that "Yesterday, we denounced the US criminal blockade against Venezuela at the UN. Today, the Trump administration responds with desperation against us. TRUTH hurts!"

According to US ambassador to the OAS Carlos Trujillo, Arreaza could face financial difficulties when trying to make transactions with the Maduro government through the US financial system, as well as visa difficulties due to the sanctions.

== See also ==
- List of ministers of foreign affairs of Venezuela
- List of current foreign ministers
- List of foreign ministers in 2017, 2018, 2019, 2020 and 2021

== Twitter ==
- Twitter - Jorge Arreaza M (@jaarreaza)

Political offices
New title	Minister of Science and Technology; 2011–2013	Succeeded by Manuel Fernández Meléndez
Preceded by Manuel Fernández Meléndez	Minister of Higher Education, Science and Technology; 2016–2017	Succeeded by Hugbel Roa
Preceded by Nicolás Maduro	Vice President of Venezuela; 2013–2016	Succeeded by Aristóbulo Istúriz
Preceded by Samuel Moncada	Minister of Foreign Affairs; 2017–2021	Succeeded by Felix Plasencia
