= Ministry of Foreign Affairs (Venezuela) =

Government ministry of Venezuela

Ministry of People's Power for Foreign Affairs and International Trade
- Ministerio del Poder Popular para Relaciones Exteriores y Comercio Internacional (Spanish); MPPRE
- Coat of arms of Venezuela

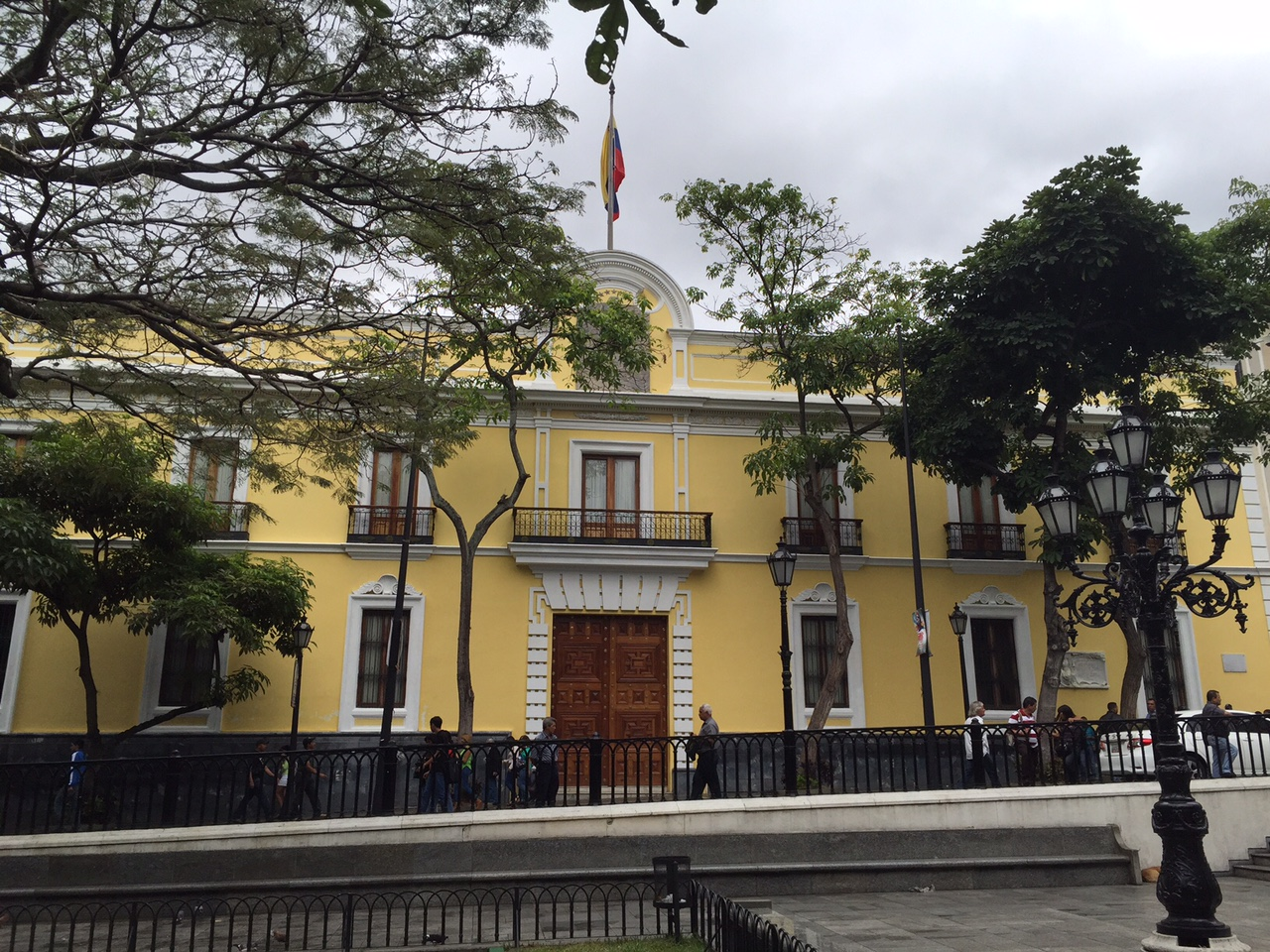
- Ministry of Foreign Affairs Headquarters (2015)

Agency overview
- Formed: 1810; 216 years ago
- Type: Ministry; Ministry of Foreign Affairs; Ministries of Venezuela
- Jurisdiction: Venezuela and its diplomatic missions
- Headquarters: Casa Amarilla, Plaza Bolívar, Caracas, Venezuela
- Minister responsible: Oliver Blanco, Minister of Foreign Affairs and International Trade
- Website: mppre.gob.ve

The Ministry of People's Power for Foreign Affairs and International Trade (Spanish: Ministerio del Poder Popular para Relaciones Exteriores y Comercio Internacional, MPPRE) is one of the organizations that make up the executive cabinet of the Government of Venezuela.

Among the main functions of this ministry is to promote, organize and plan policies abroad for Venezuela.

The ministry is a body directly dependent on the orders of the president of Venezuela. Its official headquarters are located in the Yellow House, in front of Bolívar Square. Its administrative headquarters on Avenida Urdaneta, Torre MRE (former headquarters of the defunct National Discount Bank).

== Departments ==
- Vice Ministry for Africa
- Vice Ministry for Latin America
- Vice Ministry for North America and Europe
- Vice Ministry for Asia, the Middle East and Oceania
- Vice Ministry for the Caribbean
- Vice Ministry for International Trade
- Vice Ministry for International Communication
- Vice Ministry for Multilateral Affairs.

== See also ==
- Foreign relations of Venezuela
