= Francisco González Guinán =

Venezuelan politician, journalist and lawyer

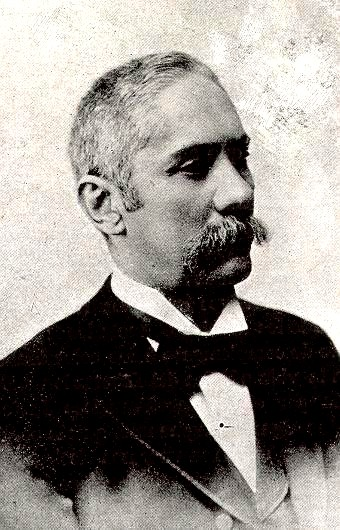

Minister of Development of Venezuela
- In office 1879–1880
- President: Antonio Guzmán Blanco

Minister of Home Affairs of Venezuela
- In office 1887–1888
- President: Hermógenes López

Minister of Foreign Affairs of Venezuela
- In office 19 December 1908 – 13 August 1909
- President: Juan Vicente Gómez
- Preceded by: José de Jesús Paúl
- Succeeded by: Juan Pietri

Personal details
- Born: 3 October 1841 Valencia, Venezuela
- Died: 7 December 1932 (aged 91) Macuto, Venezuela
- Profession: politician, historian, journalist
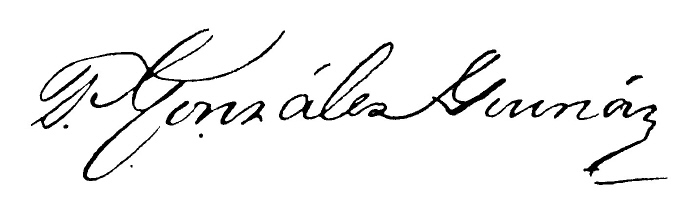
- Signature

Francisco González Guinán (3 October 1841 – 7 December 1932), was a Venezuelan politician, journalist, lawyer, prominent historian of the 19th century in his country, and one of the main supporters of Antonio Guzmán Blanco.

== Biography ==
Francisco González Guinán was born on 3 October 1841 in Valencia, Venezuela. He was a historian, journalist, and lawyer.

He was the Minister of Development of Venezuela from 1879 until 1880 under Antonio Guzmán Blanco.

Under provisional president Juan Vicente Gómez, he was the 139th Minister of Foreign Affairs of Venezuela from 19 December 1908 until 13 August 1909.

He died on 7 December 1932 in Macuto, Venezuela.

== See also ==
- List of Venezuelan writers
- List of ministers of foreign affairs of Venezuela
- Venezuelan literature
- History of Venezuela

Political offices
Preceded by José de Jesús Paúl	139th Minister of Foreign Affairs of Venezuela; 19 December 1908 – 13 August 1909	Succeeded by Juan Pietri
