= Oliver Blanco =

Venezuelan politician (born 1991)

- Blanco in 2026

Minister of Foreign Affairs
- Incumbent
- Assumed office 29 October 2026
- President: Delcy Rodríguez (acting)
- Preceded by: Félix Plasencia

Personal details
- Born: 13 March 1992 (age 34) Venezuela
- Party: Independent
- Other political affiliations: Democratic Action (2012–2019)

Oliver Blanco Marcos (born 13 March 1992) is a Venezuelan politician serving as minister of foreign affairs since 2026. From July to October 2026, he served as first deputy minister of foreign affairs. From February to July 2026, he served as deputy minister of foreign affairs for Europe and North America.

== Early life and education ==
Blanco studied international studies at the Central University of Venezuela, graduating in June 2024. He subsequently completed a master's degree in Political and Government Studies at Universidad Metropolitana in October 2026. He has also worked in strategic communications and institutional relations.

== Political career ==
Blanco began his political career in Democratic Action (AD), where he held the position of youth organization secretary. During the 2012 opposition presidential primary, he served as campaign manager for former diplomat Diego Arria. Following the opposition's victory in the 2015 Venezuelan parliamentary election, Blanco joined the administration of National Assembly president Henry Ramos Allup. In 2016, he served as director of communications and institutional relations of the National Assembly, overseeing institutional communications and relations with the press.

During the political conflict between the opposition-controlled National Assembly and the government of Nicolás Maduro, Blanco publicly criticised the government's restrictions on democratic institutions. In 2016, he temporarily left Venezuela amid political repression.

Blanco subsequently advocated negotiations between the government and the opposition. In a 2021 interview, he called for mutual recognition between the two sides and criticised their inability to reach agreements to address Venezuela's political and economic crisis. He later distanced himself from party politics.

=== Involvement in the Delcy Rodríguez government ===
On 23 February 2026, acting president Delcy Rodríguez appointed Blanco Vice Minister of Foreign Affairs for Europe and North America. His appointment attracted attention because of his previous association with the opposition. Blanco stated that he was not a member of the governing party and described his appointment as an opportunity for political cooperation. As vice minister, Blanco participated in negotiations and diplomatic contacts with the United States, the European Union and several European governments. He was involved in efforts to restore diplomatic relations following the removal of Nicolás Maduro from power in January 2026. In July 2026, Foreign Minister Félix Plasencia announced Blanco's appointment to the newly created position of First Vice Minister of Foreign Affairs and International Trade. Blanco continued to serve concurrently as vice minister for Europe and North America.

On 29 October 2026, Rodríguez appointed Blanco Minister of Foreign Affairs, replacing Plasencia, who became director of International Affairs of the Presidency. As foreign minister, Blanco stated that his priorities included strengthening international cooperation, defending Venezuelan sovereignty and promoting political inclusion.

In November 2026, Blanco headed the Venezuelan delegation to the Ibero-American Summit in Spain.

== Personal life ==
Blanco is openly gay. His partner is Luis Farías, president of the Venezuelan Red Cross.
