= Juan Pablo Rojas Paúl =

President of Venezuela (1826–1905)

Juan Pablo Rojas
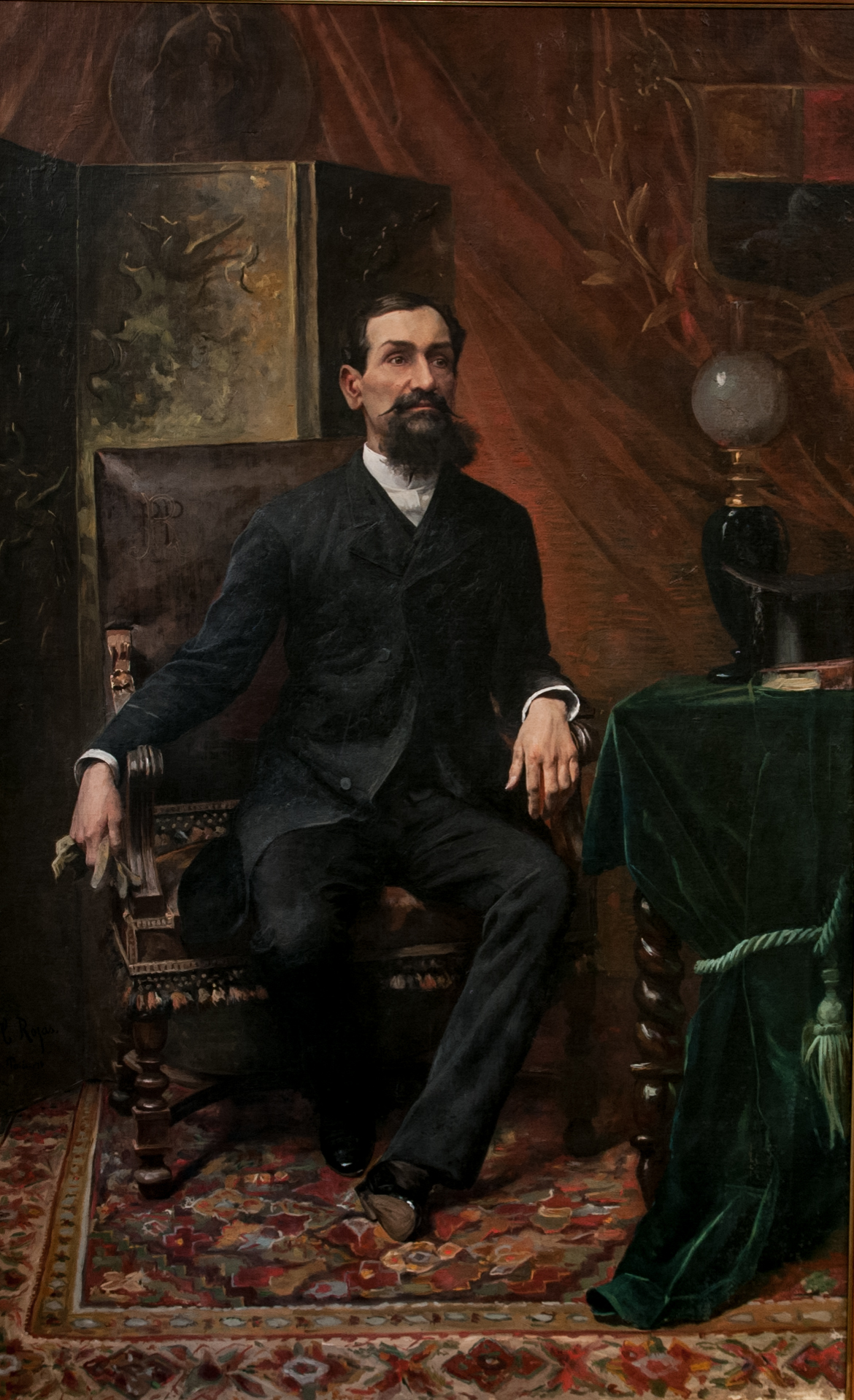

26th President of Venezuela
- In office 2 July 1888 – 19 March 1890
- Preceded by: Hermógenes López
- Succeeded by: Raimundo Andueza Palacio

Minister of Foreign Affairs of Venezuela
- In office 26 January 1855 – 7 February 1855
- President: Joaquín Herrera
- In office 24 February 1869 – 31 July 1869
- President: José Ruperto Monagas
- In office 6 December 1869 – 27 January 1870
- President: José Ruperto Monagas

Minister of Finance of Venezuela
- In office 1879–1884
- President: Antonio Guzmán Blanco
- Preceded by: Diego Jugo Ramírez
- Succeeded by: Francisco Rivas Castillo
- In office 1887–1887
- President: Hermógenes López
- Preceded by: Fulgencio M. Carias
- Succeeded by: Pedro Ramos
- In office 1899–1899
- President: Ignacio Andrade
- Preceded by: Santos Escobar
- Succeeded by: Ramón Tello Mendoza

Personal details
- Born: 26 November 1826 Caracas, Gran Colombia
- Died: 22 July 1905 (aged 78) Caracas, United States of Venezuela
- Party: Liberal Party
- Spouse: Josefa de la Concepción Báez

Juan Pablo Rojas Paúl (26 November 1826 – 22 July 1905) was the president of Venezuela from 1888 to 1890. He was the first civilian president who was elected by constitutional procedures in 50 years, and the only one who could finish his term properly, until 74 years later.

== Biography ==
He was the Minister of Finance from 1879 to 1884 and in 1887.

Rojas took over the presidency from Hermógenes López, who had served as an interim president after Antonio Guzmán (who was three times president) finally stepped down. Rojas tried to reconcile the followers of Guzmán and Joaquín Crespo, confronted at that time. During the Rojas administration there were violent demonstrations against Guzmán in the capital and other regions of Venezuela. These events precipitated a break of the Rojas administration with Guzmán, who sought to continue ruling indirectly from Paris. The Rojas administration had to face an uprising led by Crespo. After the rebellion was crushed, Crespo had to go into exile.

Breaking with Guzmán's anti-clerical policy, Rojas brought French nuns to the country, helped the establishment of congregations, also built and remodeled many religious buildings. Rojas authorized the creation of science faculties, churches, national schools in Maracaibo and Barquisimeto. He inaugurated the submarine cable between La Guaira, the Antilles and Europe, the works of the painter Martín Tovar y Tovar at the Salón Elíptico (Elliptical Room) of the National Capitol. During his period, was published the book Great geographical, historical and statistics compilation of Venezuela authored by General Manuel Landaeta Rosales. In 1888 Rojas founded the National History Academy.

His two years in the presidency were marked by an economic bonanza, of which he took advantage to invest in public works. After his presidency, he was again Minister of Finance in 1899.

He died in Caracas in 1905, at the age of 78.

== Personal life ==
Juan Pablo Rojas Paúl was married to María Josefa de la Concepción Báez, who served as First Lady of Venezuela from 1888 until 1890.

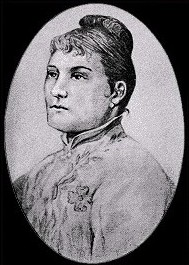
María Josefa de la Concepción Báez

== See also ==
- List of ministers of foreign affairs of Venezuela
- Presidents of Venezuela

Political offices
Preceded by Hermógenes López	President of Venezuela; 2 July 1888 – 19 March 1890	Succeeded by Raimundo Andueza Palacio
Preceded by Julián Viso	40th Minister of Foreign Affairs of Venezuela; 26 January 1855-7 February 1855	Succeeded by Francisco Aranda
Preceded by Guillermo Tell Villegas	79th Minister of Foreign Affairs of Venezuela; 24 February 1869 – 31 July 1869	Succeeded by Idelfonso Riera Aguinagalde
Preceded by Idelfonso Riera Aguinagalde	81st Minister of Foreign Affairs of Venezuela; 6 December 1869 – 27 January 1870	Succeeded by Felipe Jiménez
