= List of presidents of Venezuela =

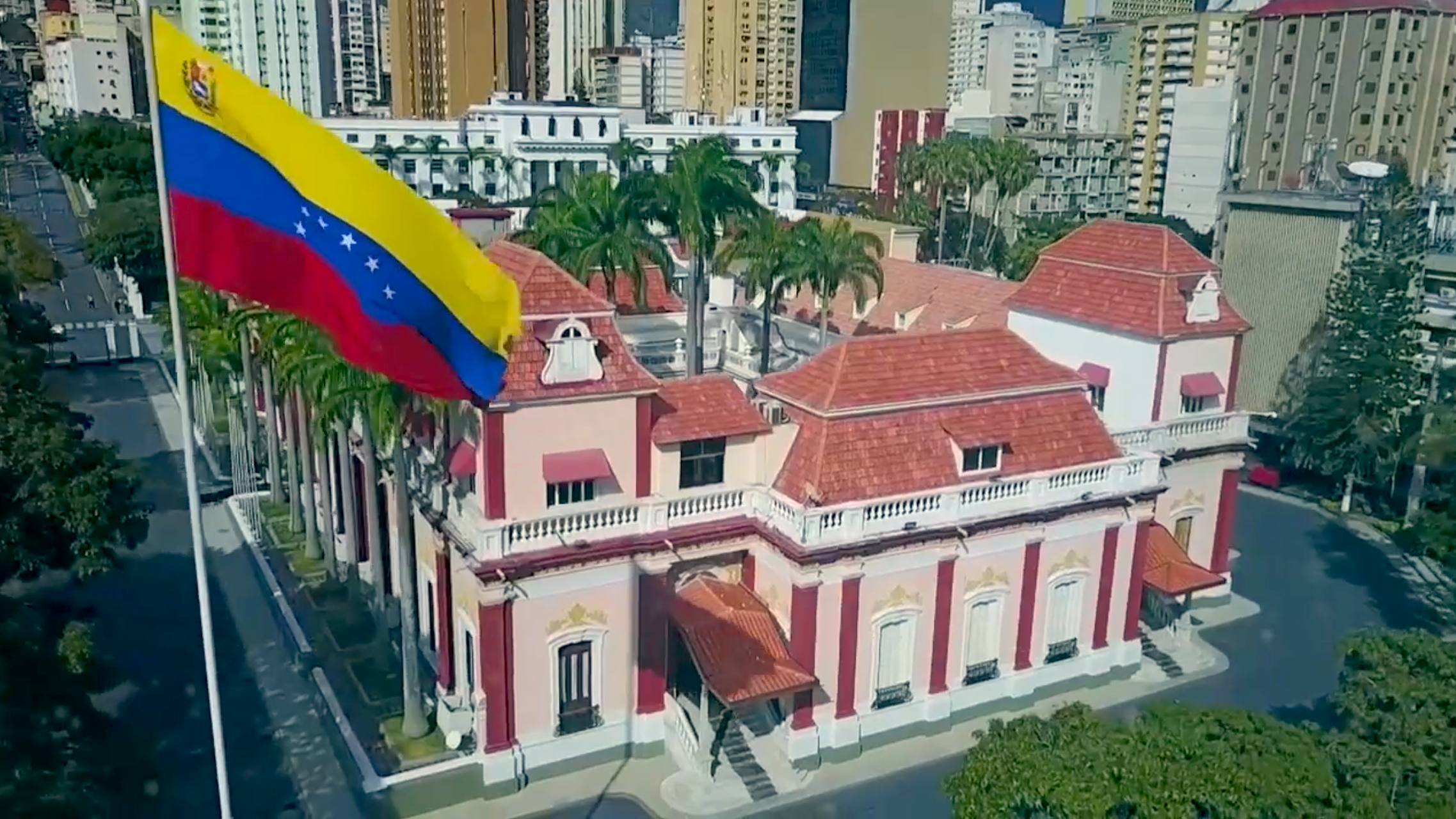
The Miraflores Palace is the president's official workplace, the center of the administration, and a prominent symbol of the office.

Under the Venezuelan Constitution, the president of Venezuela is the head of state and head of government of the Bolivarian Republic of Venezuela. As chief of the executive branch and face of the government as a whole, the presidency is the highest political office in the country by influence and recognition. The president is also the commander-in-chief of the armed forces. The president is directly elected through a popular vote to a six-year term. Since the 2009 constitutional referendum, any person can be elected to the office an indefinite number of times. Upon the death, resignation, or removal from office of an incumbent president, the vice president assumes the office. The president must be at least 30 years of age, and has to be a "natural born" citizen of Venezuela, and cannot possess any other citizenship.

This list includes persons who have led the nation following the establishment of the independent State of Venezuela following its separation from Gran Columbia. José Antonio Páez, the first president, was inaugurated on 13 January 1830. Antonio Guzmán Blanco served during the most terms, with three. Juan Vicente Gómez has served during the longest (although interrupted by interim presidencies), with over 27 years. Rómulo Betancourt served from 1959 until 1964. Hugo Chávez served the longest uninterrupted and uncontested period in office with 11 consecutive years, from his restoration to power in April 2002 until his death in March 2013.

The presidency was disputed between Juan Guaidó and Nicolás Maduro from January 2019 to 2023 during the Venezuelan presidential crisis. Maduro was elected to his first term in 2013 but received backlash from opposing Venezuelans and some members of the international community especially the United States. Maduro was accused of authoritarian rule and fraud in the elections that were held on 20 May 2018. Guaidó, the president of the National Assembly of Venezuela, took the oath of office as interim president on 23 January 2019, citing Article 233 of the Constitution of Venezuela to "cease the usurpation, hold a transitional government, and call for new elections". The office remained disputed until December 2022 when opposition parties voted to dissolve the Guaidó government effective as of 5 January 2023.

== Previous history ==
Following Venezuela's declaration of independence from Spanish colonial rule, which took effect on 5 July 1811. Owing to the profound confusion of the Venezuelan War of Independence and the period of Gran Colombia over what is now Venezuela, this page does not include national leaders between 1811 and 1830.

The first president in 1811 was actually the president of a triumvirate of the first established Republic of Venezuela that rotated the presidency weekly. The person serving as president during the week of July 5 was one of the signatories of the Declaration of Independence: Cristóbal Mendoza. Mendoza shared the triumvirate with Juan Escalona and Baltasar Padrón. A second triumvirate followed on 3 April 1812, whose members were Francisco Espejo, Fernando Rodríguez del Toro and Francisco Javier Ustariz.

Following this period of triumvirates, historians refer to the Republic of Venezuela as the Second Republic of Venezuela (1813–1814) and the Third Republic of Venezuela (1817–1819) as Simón Bolívar twice reestablished the republic. The Congress of Angostura appointed Bolívar "Supreme Commander of the Republic of Venezuela" (Jefe Supremo de la República de Venezuela) from 1819 until 1830.

In 1830, José Antonio Páez declared Venezuela independent from Gran Colombia and became president, taking office on 13 January 1830. Although he was not the first president of Venezuela (having in mind Cristóbal Mendoza in 1811), he was the first head of state of independent Venezuela, after the dissolution of Gran Colombia.

== Affiliation keys ==
Abbreviation	Party name (English)	Party name (Spanish)	Years
PC	Conservative Party	Partido Conservador	1830–1851, 1890–1892
PL	Liberal Party	Gran Partido Liberal de Venezuela	1851–1858, 1859–1861, 1868–1869, 1870–1887, 1888–1890, 1892, 1898–1899
Military	Venezuelan Armed Forces	Fuerza Armada Nacional de la República de Venezuela	1858–1859, 1861–1868, 1869–1870, 1892–1898, 1899–1913, 1922–1929, 1931–1935, 1948–1950, 1952–1958
—	Independent politician	Político independiente	1859, 1868, 1887–1888, 1913–1922, 1929–1931, 1935–1941, 1950–1952, 1958–1959
PDV	Venezuelan Democratic Party	Partido Democrático Venezolano	1941–1945
AD	Democratic Action	Acción Democrática	1945–1948, 1959–1969, 1974–1979, 1984–1994
COPEI	Copei	Comité de Organización Política Electoral Independiente	1969–1974, 1979–1984
CVGC	National Convergence	Convergencia Nacional	1994–1999
MVR-PSUV	Fifth Republic Movement–United Socialist Party	Movimiento Quinta República-Partido Socialista Unido de Venezuela	1999–present

== Presidents of Venezuela since independence (1830–present) ==
The list below includes interim "caretaker" as well as regular serving presidents, and democratically installed presidents as well as those installed by other means (e.g.; Marcos Pérez Jiménez).

=== State of Venezuela (1830–1864) ===
President of the State of Venezuela
Portrait	Name (Birth–Death)	Term of office			Political party	Elected	Government	Vice President	Ref.
Portrait	Name (Birth–Death)	Took office	Left office	Time in office	Political party	Elected	Government	Vice President	Ref.
	José Antonio Páez (1790–1873)	13 January 1830 (Note: Venezuela declared its separation from Gran Columbia at the Assembly of San Francisco on 26 November 1829, Páez was appointed President by the assembly, but his authority was not yet recognized. This is the date when Simon Bolivar resigned from his role as dictator.)	6 May 1830	5 years, 7 days	Conservative Party	—	Interim	None	
	José Antonio Páez (1790–1873)	6 May 1830 (Note: Appointed President by the Congress of Valencia.)	24 March 1831	5 years, 7 days	Conservative Party	—	Páez I	Diego Bautista Urbaneja (May 1830–1833)	
	José Antonio Páez (1790–1873)	24 March 1831	20 January 1835	5 years, 7 days	Conservative Party	1831	Páez I	Andrés Narvarte (1833–1836)	
	Andrés Narvarte (1781–1853) acting president	20 January 1835	9 February 1835	20 days	Conservative Party	—	Páez I	None	(Note: As Vice President of the Republic, exercising executive power)
	José María Vargas (1786–1854)	9 February 1835	9 July 1835 (Note: As a result of Mariño's coup, Vargas and Navarte were exiled to the Island of Saint Thomas in the Virgin Islands.)	150 days	Conservative Party	1835	Vargas	Andrés Narvarte (1833–1836)	
	Santiago Mariño (1788–1854) acting president	9 July 1835	27 July 1835	18 days	Military	Revolution of the Reforms	Vargas	None	
	José María Carreño (1792–1849) acting president	27 July 1835	20 August 1835	24 days	Conservative Party	—	Vargas	None	(Note: As Vice President of the Executive Council)
	José María Vargas (1786–1854)	20 August 1835	24 April 1836 (Note: Resigned from office)	248 days	Conservative Party	—	Vargas	Andrés Narvarte (1833–1836)	
	Andrés Narvarte (1781–1853) acting president	24 April 1836	20 January 1837	271 days	Conservative Party	—	Interim	None	
	José María Carreño (1792–1849) acting president	27 January 1837	11 March 1837	43 days	Conservative Party	—	Interim	Carlos Soublette (Note: Appointed by Congress.)	(Note: As Vice President of the Executive Council)
	Carlos Soublette (1789–1870) acting president	11 March 1837	1 February 1839	1 year, 327 days	Conservative Party	—	Interim	None	
	José Antonio Páez (1790–1873)	1 February 1839	28 January 1843	3 years, 361 days	Conservative Party	1839	Páez II	Carlos Soublette (1839–1841)	
	José Antonio Páez (1790–1873)	1 February 1839	28 January 1843	3 years, 361 days	Conservative Party	1839	Páez II	Santos Michelena (1841–1843)	
	Carlos Soublette (1789–1870)	28 January 1843	20 January 1847	3 years, 357 days	Conservative Party	1843	Soublette II	Santos Michelena (1843–1845)	
	Carlos Soublette (1789–1870)	28 January 1843	20 January 1847	3 years, 357 days	Conservative Party	1843	Soublette II	Diego Bautista Urbaneja (1845–1847)	
	Diego Bautista Urbaneja (1782–1856) acting president	20 January 1847	1 March 1847	40 days	Conservative Party	—	Interim	None	
	José Tadeo Monagas (1784–1868)	1 March 1847	20 January 1851	3 years, 325 days	Conservative Party	1846	T. Monagas I	Diego Bautista Urbaneja (1847–1849)	
	José Tadeo Monagas (1784–1868)	1 March 1847	20 January 1851	3 years, 325 days	Liberal Party	1846	T. Monagas I	Antonio Leocadio Guzmán (1849–1851)	
	Antonio Leocadio Guzmán (1801–1884) acting president	20 January 1851	5 February 1851	16 days	Liberal Party	—	Interim	None	
	José Gregorio Monagas (1795–1858)	5 February 1851	20 January 1855	3 years, 349 days	Liberal Party	1850	G. Monagas	Antonio Leocadio Guzmán (1851–1853)	
	José Gregorio Monagas (1795–1858)	5 February 1851	20 January 1855	3 years, 349 days	Liberal Party	1850	G. Monagas	Joaquín Herrera (1853–1855)	
	Joaquín Herrera (1813–1888) acting president	20 January 1855	31 January 1855	11 days	Liberal Party	—	Interim	None	
	José Tadeo Monagas (1784–1868)	31 January 1855	15 March 1858	3 years, 43 days	Liberal Party	1854	T. Monagas II	Pedro Gual	
	José Tadeo Monagas (1784–1868)	31 January 1855	15 March 1858	3 years, 43 days	Liberal Party	1857	T. Monagas II	Pedro Gual	
	Pedro Gual Escandón (1783–1862) acting president	15 March 1858	18 March 1858	3 days	Conservative Party	—	Interim	None	(Note: As President of the Provisional Government)
	Julián Castro (1810–1875)	18 March 1858	9 July 1858	1 year, 81 days	Military	March Revolution	Castro	Manuel Felipe de Tovar	
	Julián Castro (1810–1875)	9 July 1858	7 June 1859	1 year, 81 days	Military	1858	Castro	Manuel Felipe de Tovar	
	Manuel Felipe de Tovar (1803–1866) acting president	7 June 1859	13 June 1859	6 days	Liberal Party	—	Interim	None	
	Julián Castro (1810–1875)	13 June 1859 (Note: Castro had resigned the Presidency due to illness, but unexpectedly returned. This move triggered the resignation of most of his cabinet officials.)	2 August 1859 (Note: Forced to resign and imprisoned in a Coup.)	50 days	Military	—	Castro	Manuel Felipe de Tovar	
	Pedro Gual Escandón (1783–1862) acting president	2 August 1859	29 September 1859	58 days	Conservative Party	—	Interim I	Manuel Felipe de Tovar	(Note: As Interim President)
	Manuel Felipe de Tovar (1803–1866)	29 September 1859	10 April 1860	1 year, 233 days	Liberal Party	—	de Tovar	None	
	Manuel Felipe de Tovar (1803–1866)	10 April 1860	20 May 1861	1 year, 233 days	Liberal Party	1860	de Tovar	Pedro Gual Escandón	
	Pedro Gual Escandón (1783–1862) acting president	20 May 1861	29 August 1861	101 days	Conservative Party	—	Interim II	None	
	José Antonio Páez (1790–1873)	29 August 1861	15 June 1863	1 year, 290 days	Military	Coup	Páez III	None	
	Juan Crisóstomo Falcón (1820–1870) acting president	15 June 1863 (Note: Appointed Interim President as a condition of the Treaty of Coche ending the Federal War)	22 April 1864	312 days	Military	Treaty of Coche	Falcón	Antonio Leocadio Guzmán	(Note: As Interim President)

=== United States of Venezuela (1864–1953) ===
Following the end of the Federal War the Treaty of Coche was signed which provided for the drafting of a new federalist constitution. A constituent assembly was assembled in La Victoria which drafted the document and a new Congress assembled in December of 1863.

President of the United States of Venezuela
Portrait	Name (Birth–Death)	Term of office			Political party	Elected	Government	Vice President	Ref.
Portrait	Name (Birth–Death)	Took office	Left office	Time in office	Political party	Elected	Government	Vice President	Ref.
	Juan Crisóstomo Falcón (1820–1870)	22 April 1864	25 April 1868	4 years, 3 days	Liberal Party	1864	Falcón	Office abolished	
	Manuel Ezequiel Bruzual (1832–1868) acting president	25 April 1868	28 June 1868	64 days	Liberal Party	—	Interim	Office abolished	(Note: As Chief of Staff of the Army)
	José Tadeo Monagas (1784–1868) de facto president	28 June 1868	18 November 1868 (Note: Died in office.)	143 days	Military	Blue Revolution	Blue Government	Office abolished	(Note: Never called himself president, but was in charge of appointing the provisional government)
	Guillermo Tell Villegas (1823–1907) acting president	28 June 1868	20 February 1869	237 days	Liberal Party	—	Blue Government	Office abolished	(Note: Appointed by Monagas)
	José Ruperto Monagas (1831–1880)	20 February 1869	16 April 1870 (Note: Resigned in order to lead troops against Antonio Guzman.)	1 year, 55 days	Military	1869	Blue Government	Office abolished	
	Guillermo Tell Villegas (1823–1907) acting president	16 April 1870	27 April 1870	11 days	Liberal Party	—	Blue Government	Office abolished	
	Antonio Guzmán Blanco (1829–1899)	27 April 1870	15 April 1873	6 years, 306 days	Liberal Party	April Revolution	Guzmán I	Office abolished	
	Antonio Guzmán Blanco (1829–1899)	15 April 1873	27 February 1877	6 years, 306 days	Liberal Party	1872	Guzmán I	Office abolished	
	Francisco Linares Alcántara (1825–1878)	27 February 1877	30 November 1878	1 year, 276 days	Liberal Party	1877	Linares	Office abolished	
	Jacinto Gutiérrez (1808–1884) acting president	30 November 1878	15 December 1878	15 days	Liberal Party	—	Interim	Office abolished	
	José Gregorio Valera (1826–1896) acting president	15 December 1878	26 February 1879	73 days	Liberal Party	—	Valera	Office abolished	
	Antonio Guzmán Blanco (1829–1899)	26 February 1879	17 March 1882	5 years, 60 days	Liberal Party	Revindicating Revolution	Guzmán II	Office abolished	
	Antonio Guzmán Blanco (1829–1899)	17 March 1882	26 April 1884	5 years, 60 days	Liberal Party	1882	Guzmán II	Office abolished	
	Joaquín Crespo (1841–1898)	26 April 1884	27 April 1886	2 years, 1 day	Liberal Party	1884	Crespo I	Office abolished	
	Manuel Antonio Díez (1838–1916) acting president	27 April 1886	15 September 1886	141 days	Liberal Party	—	Interim	Office abolished	
	Antonio Guzmán Blanco (1829–1899)	15 September 1886	8 August 1887	327 days	Liberal Party	1886	Guzmán III	Office abolished	
	Hermógenes López (1830–1898) acting president	8 August 1887	2 July 1888	329 days	Independent	—	Interim	Office abolished	
	Juan Pablo Rojas Paúl (1826–1905)	2 July 1888	19 March 1890	1 year, 260 days	Liberal Party	1888	Rojas	Office abolished	
	Raimundo Andueza Palacio (1846–1900)	19 March 1890	17 June 1892 (Note: Left office to lead forces against the Legalist Revolution.)	2 years, 90 days	Liberal Party	1890	Andueza	Office abolished	
	Guillermo Tell Villegas (1823–1907) acting president	17 June 1892	31 August 1892	75 days	Liberal Party	—	Villegas III	Office abolished	
	Guillermo Tell Villegas Pulido (1854–1949) acting president	31 August 1892 (Note: Appointed by Congress.)	7 October 1892	37 days	Liberal Party	—	Villegas Pulido	Office abolished	
	Joaquín Crespo (1841–1898)	7 October 1892	14 March 1894	5 years, 144 days	Military	Legalist Revolution	Crespo II	Office abolished	
	Joaquín Crespo (1841–1898)	14 March 1894	28 February 1898	5 years, 144 days	Liberal Party	1894	Crespo II	Office abolished	
	Ignacio Andrade (1839–1925)	28 February 1898	20 October 1899	1 year, 234 days	Liberal Party	1897	Andrade	Office abolished	
	Víctor Rodríguez Párraga (1836–1918) acting president	20 October 1899	22 October 1899	2 days	Liberal Party	—	Interim	Office abolished	
	Cipriano Castro (1858–1924)	20 October 1899	1 March 1902	9 years, 60 days	Military	Restorative Liberal Revolution	Castro	Juan Vicente Gómez	
	Cipriano Castro (1858–1924)	1 March 1902	19 December 1908	9 years, 60 days	Military	1901	Castro	Juan Vicente Gómez	
	Cipriano Castro (1858–1924)	1 March 1902	19 December 1908	9 years, 60 days	Military	1904	Castro	Juan Vicente Gómez	
	Juan Vicente Gómez (1857–1935)	19 December 1908	3 June 1910	4 years, 229 days	Military	1908 Coup	Gómez	Office abolished	
	Juan Vicente Gómez (1857–1935)	3 June 1910	5 August 1913	4 years, 229 days	Military	1910	Gómez	Office abolished	
	José Gil Fortoul (1861–1943) acting president	5 August 1913	19 April 1914	257 days	Independent	—	Gómez	Office abolished	
	Victorino Márquez Bustillos (1858–1941)	19 April 1914	5 May 1915	8 years, 66 days	Independent	—	Gómez	Office abolished	(Note: Serving as Provisional President as Gomez remained the de facto leader of the nation.)
	Victorino Márquez Bustillos (1858–1941)	5 May 1915	24 June 1922	8 years, 66 days	Independent	1915	Gómez	Office abolished	(Note: Serving as Provisional President as Gomez remained the de facto leader of the nation.)
	Juan Vicente Gómez (1857–1935)	24 June 1922	30 May 1929	6 years, 340 days	Military	1922	Gómez	Juan Crisóstomo Gómez (1922–1923) (Note: Under the 1922 Constitution there were two Vice Presidents who served simultaneously.) (Note: Assassinated)	
	Juan Vicente Gómez (1857–1935)	24 June 1922	30 May 1929	6 years, 340 days	Military	1922	Gómez	José Vicente Gómez Bello (1922–1928)	
	Juan Vicente Gómez (1857–1935)	24 June 1922	30 May 1929	6 years, 340 days	Military	1922	Gómez	Office abolished	
	Juan Bautista Pérez (1869–1952)	30 May 1929	13 June 1931	2 years, 14 days	Independent	1929	Gómez	Office abolished	
	Juan Vicente Gómez (1857–1935)	13 June 1931	7 July 1931	4 years, 187 days	Military	—	Gómez	Office abolished	
	Juan Vicente Gómez (1857–1935)	7 July 1931	17 December 1935	4 years, 187 days	Military	1931	Gómez	Office abolished	
	Eleazar López Contreras (1883–1973)	18 December 1935	30 June 1936	5 years, 138 days	Independent	Interim	López	Office abolished	
	Eleazar López Contreras (1883–1973)	30 June 1936	5 May 1941	5 years, 138 days	Independent	1936	López	Office abolished	
	Isaías Medina Angarita (1897–1953)	5 May 1941	18 October 1945	4 years, 166 days	Democratic Party	1941	Medina	Office abolished	
	Rómulo Betancourt (1908–1981)	18 October 1945	15 February 1948	2 years, 120 days	Democratic Action	1945 Coup	Betancourt I	Office abolished	
	Rómulo Gallegos (1884–1969)	15 February 1948	24 November 1948	283 days	Democratic Action	1947	Gallegos	Office abolished	
	Carlos Delgado Chalbaud (1909–1950)	24 November 1948	13 November 1950	1 year, 354 days	Military	1948 Coup	Delgado	Office abolished	
	Germán Suárez Flamerich (1907–1990)	27 November 1950	2 December 1952	2 years, 5 days	Independent	Acting President	Suárez	Office abolished	

=== Republic of Venezuela (1953–1999) ===
Venezuela took the name of Republic of Venezuela (Spanish: República de Venezuela) with the adoption of the 1953 constitution, written by the Constituent Assembly elected in November 1952. The Presidents of Venezuela under this constitution (as well as the 1961 Constitution, which kept the name) were officially styled as President of the Republic of Venezuela.

This period of the history of Venezuela began with the dictatorship of Marcos Pérez Jiménez. After a short period of political instability following Pérez Jiménez's exile in 1958, democracy was restored in the country with the election of Democratic Action leader Rómulo Betancourt as president in 1959. This marked the beginning of the democratic period, started with the Puntofijo Pact and which was characterized by the prevalence of the bipartidism of the two main political parties in the country at the time, Democratic Action and Copei.

The second presidency of Carlos Andrés Pérez (1989–93) saw a deep economic crisis, a series of major riots known as the Caracazo in 1989, in which hundreds were killed by security forces, two coup attempts in 1992, and the 1993 impeachment of Pérez. That same year, Rafael Caldera became the first President of Venezuela not to belong to either Democratic Action or Copei in over forty years, having been elected under the banner of National Convergence. The bipartidism ended in 2000 when a new constitution entered in force.

President of the Republic of Venezuela
Portrait	Name (Birth–Death)	Term of office			Political party	Elected	Government	Ref.
Portrait	Name (Birth–Death)	Took office	Left office	Time in office	Political party	Elected	Government	Ref.
	Marcos Pérez Jiménez (1914–2001)	2 December 1952	19 April 1953	5 years, 52 days	Military	—	M. Pérez	(Note: Appointed by Armed Forces after the ratification of the 1952 Constituent Assembly)
	Marcos Pérez Jiménez (1914–2001)	19 April 1953	23 January 1958	5 years, 52 days	Military	1952	M. Pérez	(Note: Appointed by Armed Forces after the ratification of the 1952 Constituent Assembly)
	Wolfgang Larrazábal (1911–2003)	23 January 1958	14 November 1958 (Note: Larrazábal resigned early to challenge Rómulo Betancourt at the 1958 election, leaving Edgar Sanabria as acting president until the end of his term, on 13 February 1959.)	295 days	Independent	1958 Coup	Interim	
	Edgar Sanabria (1911–1989) acting president	14 November 1958	13 February 1959	91 days	Independent	—	Interim	
	Rómulo Betancourt (1908–1981)	13 February 1959	11 March 1964	5 years, 27 days	Democratic Action	1958	Betancourt II	
	Raúl Leoni (1905–1972)	11 March 1964	11 March 1969	5 years	Democratic Action	1963	Leoni	
	Rafael Caldera (1916–2009)	11 March 1969	12 March 1974	5 years, 1 day	Copei	1968	Caldera I	
	Carlos Andrés Pérez (1922–2010)	12 March 1974	12 March 1979	5 years	Democratic Action	1973	C. Pérez I	
	Luis Herrera Campins (1925–2007)	12 March 1979	2 February 1984	4 years, 327 days	Copei	1978	Campins	
	Jaime Lusinchi (1924–2014)	2 February 1984	2 February 1989	5 years	Democratic Action	1983	Lusinchi	
	Carlos Andrés Pérez (1922–2010)	2 February 1989	21 May 1993 (Note: Impeached.)	4 years, 108 days	Democratic Action	1988	C. Pérez II	
	Octavio Lepage (1923–2017) acting president	21 May 1993	5 June 1993	15 days	Democratic Action	—	Interim	(Note: Octavio Lepage, then President of Congress, served as acting president from 21 May 1993 until 5 June 1993, when Ramón José Velásquez was formally selected to succeed Perez as president.)
	Ramón José Velásquez (1916–2014) acting president	5 June 1993	2 February 1994	242 days	Democratic Action	1993 (Note: Indirect election on 4 June 1993 carried out by the Congress of Venezuela.)	Interim	
	Rafael Caldera (1916–2009)	2 February 1994	2 February 1999	5 years	National Convergence	1993 (Note: Direct election on 5 December 1993.)	Caldera II	
	Hugo Chávez (1954–2013)	2 February 1999	30 December 1999	331 days	Fifth Republic Movement	1998	Chávez I	

=== Bolivarian Republic of Venezuela (1999–present) ===
Venezuela became the Bolivarian Republic of Venezuela (Spanish: República Bolivariana de Venezuela) with the adoption of the 1999 constitution, which renamed the country in honor of Simón Bolívar. The new constitution was promulgated by President Hugo Chávez, who served from 1999 until his death in 2013. The new constitution augmented the presidential term from five years to six years.

Chávez's presidency was interrupted shortly in 2002 following a failed coup attempt that put Pedro Carmona in office for a day. After government-loyal forces ousted Carmona from Miraflores, Vice President Diosdado Cabello assumed executive control for a couple of hours until Chávez could be restored. In 2009, a constitutional referendum approved the elimination of term limits, which allowed Chávez to be re-elected again in 2012. However, Chávez died in March 2013, only three months into his fourth term, and was succeeded by his Vice President Nicolás Maduro, who was elected the following month to finish Chávez's term, enforcing the majority of Chávez's economic policies.

Under Maduro, Venezuela has seen a rise in unemployment, shortages of goods, closures of several corporations, and the deterioration of productivity. Maduro – who has seen a sharp decline in his approval ratings in correlation to the economic collapse, and was the subject of a 2016 recall referendum to remove him from office that was later suspended – has been criticized for what opponents consider to be him backsliding the country towards a full-fledged authoritarian regime; this led to an ongoing constitutional crisis stemming from a March 2017 ruling by the Supreme Tribunal of Justice (whose members largely consist of Maduro supporters) that removed immunity for National Assembly members (including those opposing Maduro), which subsequently made a brief assumption of legislative powers from the Assembly, and the Constituent Assembly election, which resulted in the formation of a Constituent Assembly intended to rewrite the 1999 constitution. These actions have worsened tensions and sparked violence during protests against the Maduro administration over concerns that Maduro would eliminate or significantly erode the independence of Venezuela's democratic institutions and shift the country towards one-man rule.

President of the Bolivarian Republic of Venezuela
Portrait	Name (Birth–Death)	Term of office			Political party	Elected	Government	Vice President	Ref.
Portrait	Name (Birth–Death)	Took office	Left office	Time in office	Political party	Elected	Government	Vice President	Ref.
	Hugo Chávez (1954–2013)	30 December 1999	12 April 2002 (Note: Deposed in the 2002 Venezuelan coup attempt, before being restored after two days.)	2 years, 103 days	Fifth Republic Movement	—	Chávez I	Vacant until 2000	
	Hugo Chávez (1954–2013)	30 December 1999	12 April 2002	2 years, 103 days	Fifth Republic Movement	—	Chávez I	Isaías Rodríguez (2000)	
	Hugo Chávez (1954–2013)	30 December 1999	12 April 2002	2 years, 103 days	Fifth Republic Movement	2000	Chávez II	Adina Bastidas (2000–2002)	
	Hugo Chávez (1954–2013)	30 December 1999	12 April 2002	2 years, 103 days	Fifth Republic Movement	2000	Chávez II	Diosdado Cabello (2002)	
	Pedro Carmona (born 1941) acting president	12 April 2002	13 April 2002	1 day	Independent	2002 Coup	Carmona	None	
	Diosdado Cabello (born 1963) acting president	13 April 2002	14 April 2002	1 day	Fifth Republic Movement	—	Interim	None	
	Hugo Chávez (1954–2013)	14 April 2002	5 March 2013 (Note: Died in office.)	10 years, 325 days	Fifth Republic Movement (until October 2007)	—	Chávez II	José Vicente Rangel (2002–2007)	
	Hugo Chávez (1954–2013)	14 April 2002	5 March 2013	10 years, 325 days	Fifth Republic Movement (until October 2007)	2006	Chávez III	Jorge Rodríguez (2007–2008)	
	Hugo Chávez (1954–2013)	14 April 2002	5 March 2013	10 years, 325 days	Fifth Republic Movement (until October 2007)	2006	Chávez III	Ramón Carrizalez (2008–2010)	
	Hugo Chávez (1954–2013)	14 April 2002	5 March 2013	10 years, 325 days	Fifth Republic Movement (until October 2007)	2006	Chávez III	Elias Jaua (2010–2012)	
	Hugo Chávez (1954–2013)	14 April 2002	5 March 2013	10 years, 325 days	United Socialist Party (from October 2007)	2012	Chávez IV	Nicolás Maduro (2012–2013)	
	Nicolás Maduro (born 1962)	10 December 2012	5 March 2013	85 days	United Socialist Party	—	(Note: Vice President acting with provisional executive power while Chavez was hospitalized in Cuba.)	None	
	Nicolás Maduro (born 1962)	5 March 2013	19 April 2013	45 days	United Socialist Party	—	Interim	None	
	Nicolás Maduro (born 1962)	19 April 2013	5 January 2026 (Note: Following the 2026 United States strikes in Venezuela, in which Maduro was captured by and taken to the United States, vice president Delcy Rodríguez was appointed acting president by order of the Supreme Tribunal of Justice. Both Rodríguez and Maduro have asserted that the latter remains the legal officeholder.)	13 years, 217 days	United Socialist Party	2013	Maduro I	Jorge Arreaza (2013–2016)	
	Nicolás Maduro (born 1962)	19 April 2013	5 January 2026	13 years, 217 days	United Socialist Party	2013	Maduro I	Aristóbulo Iztúriz (2016–2017)	
	Nicolás Maduro (born 1962)	19 April 2013	5 January 2026	13 years, 217 days	United Socialist Party	2013	Maduro I	Tareck El Aissami (2017–2018)	
	Nicolás Maduro (born 1962)	19 April 2013	5 January 2026	13 years, 217 days	United Socialist Party	2018	Maduro II	Delcy Rodríguez (2018–2026)	
	Nicolás Maduro (born 1962)	19 April 2013	5 January 2026	13 years, 217 days	United Socialist Party	2024 (Disputed)	Maduro III	Delcy Rodríguez (2018–2026)	
	Delcy Rodríguez (born 1969) acting president	5 January 2026 (Note: Designated by the Supreme Tribunal of Justice to ensure administrative continuity on 3 January, formally sworn in two days later.)	Incumbent	321 days	United Socialist Party	—	Rodríguez	None	

==== Disputed ====
The process and results of the May 2018 Venezuelan presidential election were widely disputed. The opposition-majority National Assembly declared Maduro a "usurper" of the presidency on the day of his second inauguration and disclosed a plan to set forth its president, Juan Guaidó as the succeeding acting President of the country under article 233 of the Venezuelan Constitution. A week later, the Supreme Tribunal of Justice declared that the presidency of the National Assembly was the "usurper" of authority and declared the body to be unconstitutional.

Minutes after Maduro took the oath as President of Venezuela, the Organization of American States (OAS) approved a resolution in a special session of its Permanent Council declaring Maduro's presidency illegitimate and urging new elections. Special meetings of the OAS on 24 January and in the United Nations Security Council on 26 January were held but no consensus was reached. Secretary-General of the United Nations António Guterres called for dialogue. During the 49th General Assembly of the Organization of American States, on 27 June, Guaidó's presidency was recognized by the organization.

Guaidó was declared acting president and swore himself in on 23 January. Maduro's government has accused the United States of organizing a coup d'état to remove him and take control of the country's oil reserves. Guaidó rejects the characterization of his actions as a coup, saying that his movement is backed by peaceful volunteers. As of June 2019, Guaidó was recognized as the acting President of Venezuela by 54 countries. Internationally, support has followed traditional geopolitical lines, with allies China, Cuba, Iran, Russia, Syria, and Turkey supporting Maduro; and the US, Canada, and most of Western Europe supporting Guaidó as acting president. The United Nations continued to recognize the Maduro presidency as the legal representative of Venezuela as of December 2019.

On 22 December 2022, the Venezuelan opposition held an initial vote to remove Guaidó's interim government from its leadership and on 30 December 2022, three of the four main opposition political parties (Justice First, Democratic Action and A New Era) approved a reform to dissolve the interim government and instead create a commission of five members to manage foreign assets, stating the failure of the interim government to achieve the goals it had set. The amendment was voted by the opposition as deputies sought a united strategy ahead of the presidential elections in 2024 with the reform approved with 72 votes in favor, 29 against and 8 abstentions, thus dissolving the Guaidó government effective 5 January 2023.

President of the Bolivarian Republic of Venezuela
Portrait	Name (Birth–Death)	Term of office			Political party	Elected	Government	Ref.
Portrait	Name (Birth–Death)	Took office	Left office	Time in office	Political party	Elected	Government	Ref.
	Juan Guaidó (born 1983)	23 January 2019	5 January 2023	3 years, 347 days	Popular Will (until 2020)	—	Guaidó	
	Juan Guaidó (born 1983)	23 January 2019	5 January 2023	3 years, 347 days	Independent (from 2020)	—	Guaidó	
	Edmundo González (born 1949)	10 January 2025	Incumbent	1 year, 316 days	Independent	2024 (Disputed)		

== See also ==
- List of current heads of state and government
- List of vice presidents of Venezuela
