= Interim government of Julián Castro =

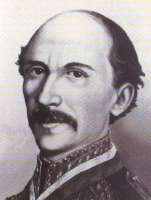
Julián Castro

The interim government of Julián Castro came to power after the union of liberals and conservatives in the March Revolution, led in 1858 by Castro, governor of Carabobo, against the dictatorship of the Monagas brothers. It functioned as a de facto government until the National Convention of Valencia, when Castro was ratified as interim president.

The constitution was changed, and universal suffrage was approved. His foreign policy included the Urrutia Protocol. The president initially allied himself with the conservatives and, after the outbreak of the Federal War, shifted his support to the liberals, which led to his arrest and forced resignation in 1859, followed by his exile the following year. He was succeeded by interim president Pedro Gual, of the Conservative Party.

== Background ==
The March Revolution was a military uprising that took place in Venezuela in March 1858. It was the first armed rebellion that managed to overthrow a government in Venezuelan history. The principal leader, the caudillo Julián Castro, was trusted absolutely by President José Tadeo Monagas.

The main drivers of the movement were the social issues and political abuse which had accumulated during the Monagato or Liberal Oligarchy – a decade in which the brothers José Tadeo Monagas and José Gregorio Monagas ruled (1847–1858). Additionally, this period featured political sectarianism, high corruption, mismanagement of public finances and the central government's lack of concern with the provinces. The consequences were extreme political violence and great social chaos. Similar events had occurred in 1848, 1849, 1853 and 1856.

== Cabinet ==
Manuel Felipe de Tovar served as Secretary of Interior and Justice in Castro's first coalition cabinet.

== Domestic policy ==
=== Legislative policy ===
A Convention was established on August 5, 1858, and issued a new constitution approved on December 31 of that year, which established universal suffrage.

=== Judicial policy ===
On March 7, 1858, civil liability trials began against officials of the Monagato, where embezzlement of public funds in the previous government was reported. On June 7 of that year, Juan Crisóstomo Falcón, José Ramón Soto, Ezequiel Zamora, Wenceslao Casado, Carmelo Gil, Antonio Leocadio Guzmán, Ramón Anzola Tovar, Joaquín Herrera, José Manuel García, Ramón Suárez, Pío Ceballo, Diego Antonio Alcalá, Jesús María Aristiguieta, José Gabriel Ochoa, José Simón Gimeno, Pedro Conde, Fabricio Conde, and Carmelo Villamartín Valiente were expelled from the country.

== Opposition ==
Castro's government exiled José Tadeo Monagas, Juan Crisóstomo Falcón, Ezequiel Zamora, and Antonio Leocadio Guzmán on June 7, 1858. José Gregorio Monagas was imprisoned and died in prison on July 15 of that year.

=== Federal War ===
The Federal War (Spanish: Guerra Federal) — also known as the Great War or the 5 Year War — was a civil war in Venezuela between the Conservative Party and the Liberal Party over the monopoly the Conservatives held over government positions and land ownership, and their intransigence in granting any reforms. This drove the Liberals – known as the Federalists – to look for greater autonomy for the provinces: a new federalism for Venezuela, as it were. It was the biggest and bloodiest civil war that Venezuela had since its independence from Spain on 5 July 1811. Around a hundred thousand people died in the violence of the war, or from hunger or disease, in a country with a population of just over a million people.

The conflict was a struggle for power between the conservative government of President Julián Castro, who had ousted his predecessor José Tadeo Monagas in March 1858, and the liberal opposition led by Ezequiel Zamora.

The Liberals initially gained the upper hand, winning several battles in 1859, until their crushing defeat in the Battle of Coplé in February 1860. After this defeat and the death of Ezequiel Zamora, the new Liberal leader Juan Crisóstomo Falcón switched to guerrilla warfare, that by 1863 had weakened the government troops and caused the desertion of thousands of their soldiers. This forced the Conservative leader José Antonio Páez to sue for peace.

== Arrest and exile of Castro ==
On August 1, 1859, Castro was arrested as a result of a conspiracy by interim vice president Manuel Felipe de Tovar, of the conservative wing, after which he was forced to resign, and subsequently tried for treason and exiled in 1860.

== See also ==
- Monagato
- Federal War
