= Vice President of Venezuela =

Executive Vice President of the Bolivarian Republic of Venezuela
- Vicepresidente Ejecutivo de la República Bolivariana de Venezuela
- Logo of the Vice President of Venezuela

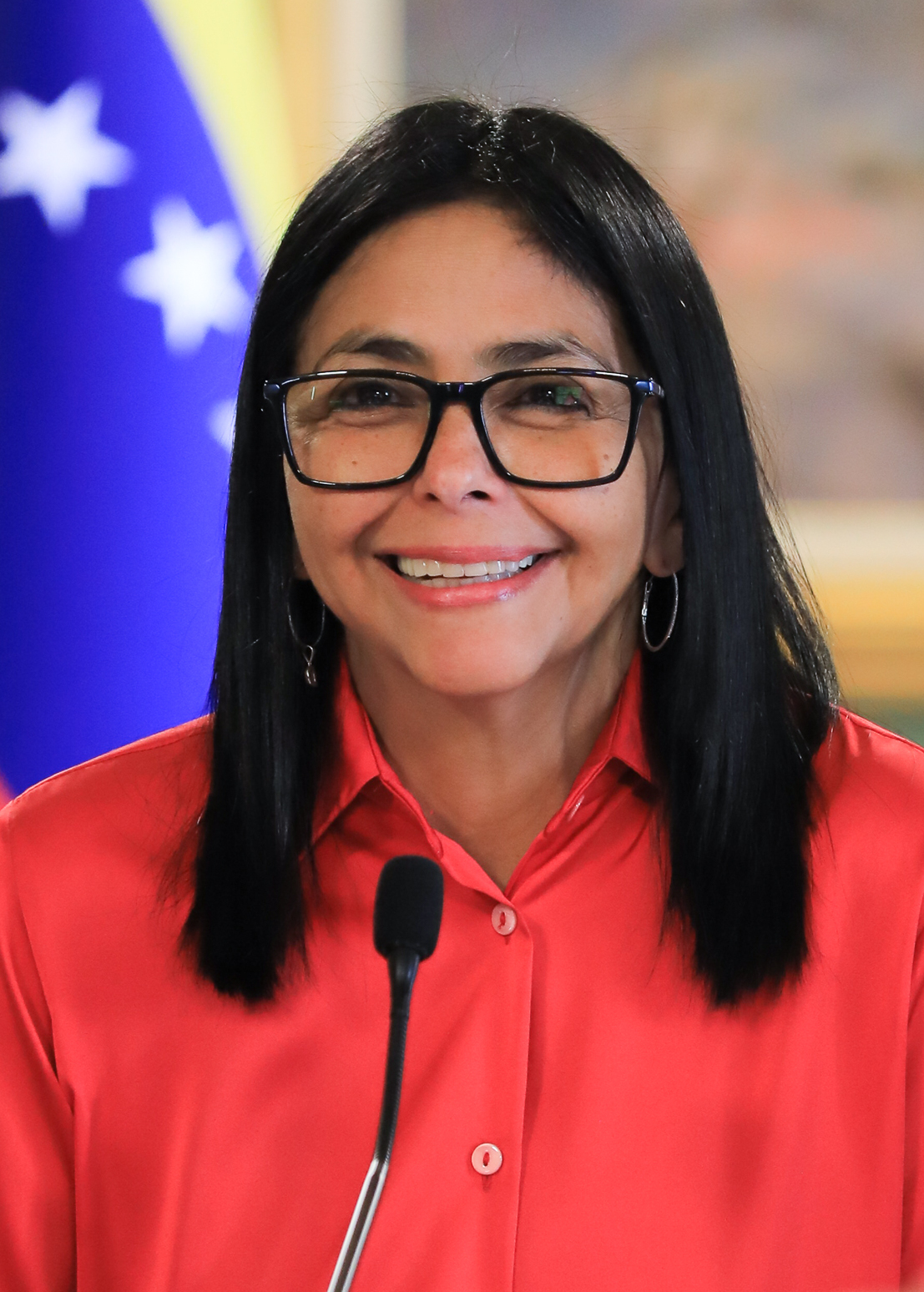
- Incumbent; Delcy Rodríguez since 14 June 2018
- Residence: La Viñeta
- Term length: No fixed term at the president's pleasure
- Inaugural holder: Diego Bautista Urbaneja
- Formation: 1830
- Website: Vicepresidencia de la Republica Bolivariana de Venezuela

The vice president of Venezuela (Spanish: Vicepresidente de Venezuela), officially known as the Executive Vice President of the Bolivarian Republic of Venezuela (Spanish: Vicepresidente Ejecutivo de la República Bolivariana de Venezuela), is the second highest political position in the government of Venezuela. The vice president is the direct collaborator of the Venezuelan president according to the Constitution. The office of vice president appeared in the Constitution of 1830 until the Constitution of 1858, and once again in the Constitution of 1999. However, in its current (1999) incarnation, the office is more akin to a prime minister in systems as those of France and South Korea.

Since June 14, 2018, Delcy Rodríguez of the United Socialist Party of Venezuela has been vice president, serving with President Nicolás Maduro until his capture in January 2026, which she now acts as the interim President of Venezuela since 5 January of 2026.

== Office of the executive vice president ==
=== Functions and duties ===
According to the Constitution of 1999, the duties of the executive vice president are

1. To collaborate with the president of the Republic to direct the actions of the Government.
2. To coordinate the Public National Administration in accordance with the instructions of the president of the Republic.
3. To propose the appointment and the removal of the ministers to the president of the Republic.
4. To preside over the Cabinet if the president is absent or with authorization in advance from the president.
5. To coordinate the relations of the National Executive with the National Assembly.
6. To preside at the Federal Council of Government.
7. To name and to remove, in accordance with the law, the officials or national officials whose designation is not attributed to another authority.
8. To substitute for the president of the Republic on temporary and absolute absences.
9. To exercise the duties delegated by the president of the Republic.

=== Appointment and removal ===
The executive vice president is appointed and removed by the president. The vice president can also be removed with more than two-thirds of the votes in National Assembly. If the National Assembly removes three vice presidents from office during a six-year presidential term, the president is authorized to dissolve the Parliament.

=== Presidential succession ===
The executive vice president is the first in line to the succession of the president of Venezuela, when the president is unable to fulfill the duties of office in the exceptional cases established in the Article 233 and 234 of the National Constitution.

Former vice presidents Andrés Navarte, Carlos Soublette, Diosdado Cabello (in April 2002) and Nicolás Maduro (in 2012–2013) were all once acting presidents of Venezuela. Soublette and Maduro were also later elected as president.

== List of vice presidents of Venezuela ==
=== State of Venezuela (1830–1864) ===
Portrait	Name (Birth–Death)	Term in office — Political party		Notes	President
	Diego Bautista Urbaneja (1782–1856)	1830	1833	Interim	José Antonio Páez (1830–1835)
	Diego Bautista Urbaneja (1782–1856)	Conservative Party		Interim	José Antonio Páez (1830–1835)
	Andrés Narvarte (1781–1853)	1830	1835	Indirect elections	José Antonio Páez (1830–1835)
	Andrés Narvarte (1781–1853)	Conservative Party		Indirect elections	José María Vargas (1835)
Vacancy under José María Carreño (1835)
	Andrés Narvarte (1781–1853)	1835	1836	Indirect elections	José María Vargas (1835–1836)
	Andrés Narvarte (1781–1853)	Conservative Party		Indirect elections	José María Vargas (1835–1836)
	José María Carreño (1792–1849)	1836	1837	Indirect elections	Andrés Narvarte (1836–1837)
	José María Carreño (1792–1849)	Conservative Party		Indirect elections	Andrés Narvarte (1836–1837)
	Diego Bautista Urbaneja (1782–1856)	1837		Indirect elections	José María Carreño (1837)
	Diego Bautista Urbaneja (1782–1856)	Conservative Party		Indirect elections	José María Carreño (1837)
Vacancy under Carlos Soublette (1837–1839)
	Carlos Soublette (1789–1870)	1839	1841	Indirect elections	José Antonio Páez (1839–1843)
	Carlos Soublette (1789–1870)	Conservative Party		Indirect elections	José Antonio Páez (1839–1843)
	Santos Michelena (1797–1848)	1841	1845	Indirect elections	José Antonio Páez (1839–1843)
	Santos Michelena (1797–1848)	Conservative Party		Indirect elections	Carlos Soublette (1843–1847)
	Diego Bautista Urbaneja (1782–1856)	1845	1847	Indirect elections	Carlos Soublette (1843–1847)
	Diego Bautista Urbaneja (1782–1856)	Conservative Party		Indirect elections	José Tadeo Monagas (1847–1851)
	Antonio Leocadio Guzmán (1801–1884)	1847	1851	Indirect elections	José Tadeo Monagas (1847–1851)
	Antonio Leocadio Guzmán (1801–1884)	Liberal Party		Indirect elections	José Gregorio Monagas (1851–1855)
	Joaquín Herrera (1784–1868)	1851	1855	Interim	José Gregorio Monagas (1851–1855)
	Joaquín Herrera (1784–1868)	Liberal Party		Interim	José Gregorio Monagas (1851–1855)
Vacancy under José Tadeo Monagas (1855–1858)
	Manuel Felipe de Tovar (1803–1866)	1858	1859	Interim	Julián Castro (1858–1859)
	Manuel Felipe de Tovar (1803–1866)	Liberal Party		Interim	Pedro Gual (1859)
Vacancy under Manuel Felipe de Tovar (1859–1860)
	Pedro Gual Escandón (1783–1862)	1860	1861	Interim	Manuel de Tovar (1859–1861)
	Pedro Gual Escandón (1783–1862)	Liberal Party		Interim	Manuel de Tovar (1859–1861)
Vacancy under Pedro Gual Escandón (1861)
Vacancy under José Antonio Páez (1861–1863)
	Antonio Leocadio Guzmán (1801–1884)	1863	1868	Indirect elections	Juan Crisóstomo Falcón (1863—1868)
	Antonio Leocadio Guzmán (1801–1884)	Liberal Party		Indirect elections	Juan Crisóstomo Falcón (1863—1868)

=== United States of Venezuela (1901–1928) ===
Portrait	Name (Birth–Death)	Term in office —		Notes	President
	Jesús Ramón Ayala (?–?)	March 1901	April 1904	First Vice President	Cipriano Castro
	Juan Vicente Gómez (1857–1935)	March 1901	April 1904	Second Vice President	Cipriano Castro
	Juan Vicente Gómez (1857–1935)	April 1904	1908	First Vice President	Cipriano Castro
	José Antonio Velutini (1844–1912)	April 1904	1908	Second Vice President	Cipriano Castro
	Juan Pietri Pietri (1849–1911)	Apr 1910	28 May 1911		Juan Vicente Gómez
	Juan Crisóstomo Gómez (1860–1923)	June 1922	30 June 1923	First Vice President	Juan Vicente Gómez
	José Vicente Gómez Bello (1884–1930)	June 1922	May 1928	Second Vice President	Juan Vicente Gómez

=== Fifth Republic (1999–2026) ===
Portrait	Name (Birth–Death)	Term in office — Political party		Notes	President
	Isaías Rodríguez (1942–2025)	29 January 2000	24 December 2000	Directly designated	Hugo Chávez (1999–2002)
	Isaías Rodríguez (1942–2025)	Fifth Republic Movement		Directly designated	Hugo Chávez (1999–2002)
	Adina Bastidas (born 1943)	24 December 2000	13 January 2002	Directly designated	Hugo Chávez (1999–2002)
	Adina Bastidas (born 1943)	Independent		Directly designated	Hugo Chávez (1999–2002)
	Diosdado Cabello (born 1963)	13 January 2002	12 April 2002	Directly designated	Hugo Chávez (1999–2002)
	Diosdado Cabello (born 1963)	Fifth Republic Movement		Directly designated	Hugo Chávez (1999–2002)
Vacancy under Pedro Carmona (2002)
Vacancy under Diosdado Cabello (2002)
	Diosdado Cabello (born 1963)	14 April 2002	28 April 2002	Directly designated	Hugo Chávez (2002–2013)
	Diosdado Cabello (born 1963)	Fifth Republic Movement		Directly designated	Hugo Chávez (2002–2013)
	José Vicente Rangel (1929–2020)	28 April 2002	3 January 2007	Directly designated	Hugo Chávez (2002–2013)
	José Vicente Rangel (1929–2020)	Fifth Republic Movement		Directly designated	Hugo Chávez (2002–2013)
	Jorge Rodríguez (born 1965)	3 January 2007	4 January 2008	Directly designated	Hugo Chávez (2002–2013)
	Jorge Rodríguez (born 1965)	Fifth Republic Movement		Directly designated	Hugo Chávez (2002–2013)
	Ramón Carrizales (born 1952)	4 January 2008	26 January 2010	Directly designated	Hugo Chávez (2002–2013)
	Ramón Carrizales (born 1952)	Fifth Republic Movement; United Socialist Party		Directly designated	Hugo Chávez (2002–2013)
	Elías Jaua (born 1969)	26 January 2010	13 October 2012	Directly designated	Hugo Chávez (2002–2013)
	Elías Jaua (born 1969)	United Socialist Party		Directly designated	Hugo Chávez (2002–2013)
	Nicolás Maduro (born 1962)	13 October 2012	8 March 2013	Directly designated	Hugo Chávez (2002–2013)
	Nicolás Maduro (born 1962)	United Socialist Party		Directly designated	Hugo Chávez (2002–2013)
	Jorge Arreaza (born 1973)	8 March 2013	6 January 2016	Directly designated	Nicolás Maduro (2013–2026)
	Jorge Arreaza (born 1973)	United Socialist Party		Directly designated	Nicolás Maduro (2013–2026)
	Aristóbulo Istúriz (1946–2021)	6 January 2016	4 January 2017	Directly designated	Nicolás Maduro (2013–2026)
	Aristóbulo Istúriz (1946–2021)	United Socialist Party		Directly designated	Nicolás Maduro (2013–2026)
	Tareck El Aissami (born 1974)	4 January 2017	14 June 2018	Directly designated	Nicolás Maduro (2013–2026)
	Tareck El Aissami (born 1974)	United Socialist Party		Directly designated	Nicolás Maduro (2013–2026)
	Delcy Rodríguez (born 1969)	14 June 2018	present		Nicolás Maduro (2013–2026)

== See also ==
- List of presidents of Venezuela
- List of current vice presidents
