= Presidency of Raimundo Andueza Palacio =

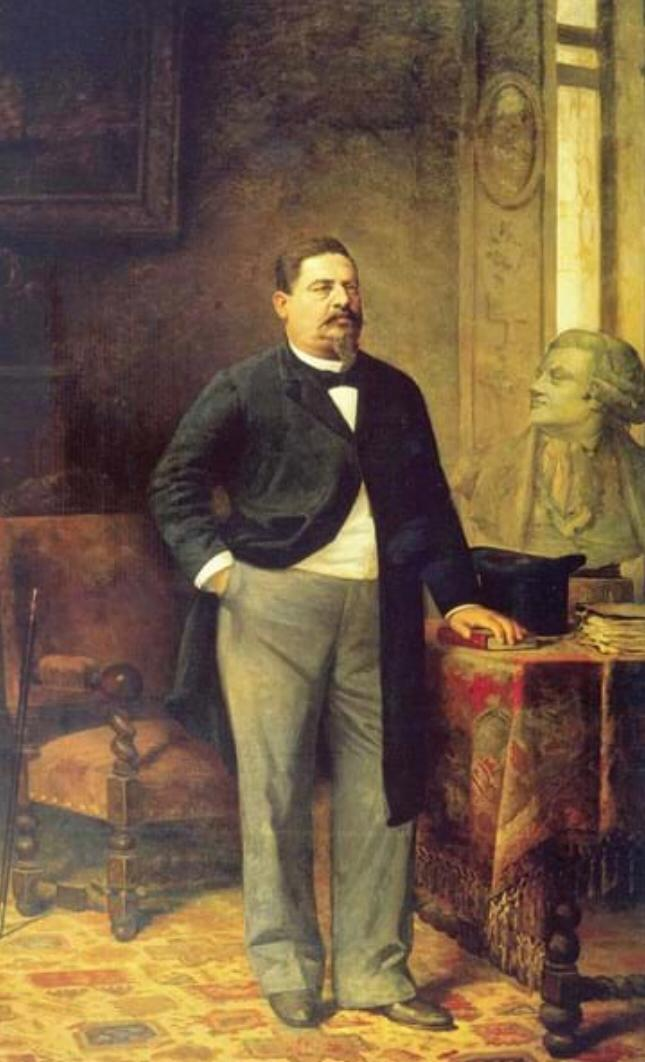
Raimundo Andueza Palacio

The presidency of Raimundo Andueza Palacio was elected by the Federal Council, where Andueza represented the state of Zamora. Palacio succeeded the presidency of Juan Pablo Rojas Paúl and was the second and last of two Liberal Party governments that were independent of Antonio Guzmán Blanco's influence during the final decade of the Liberal Yellow Party era.

After presidential terms had been limited by the 1881 constitution to two years, a measure implemented by Guzmán Blanco to curb the power of presidents under his influence, President Andueza Palacio attempted, in vain, to reform the constitution to extend his mandate.

The government's foreign and immigration policy was racist, including an 1891 law that prohibited the entry into the country of "non-white" foreigners.

Supporters of the government called themselves the "continuistas." President Andueza Palacio was overthrown by Joaquín Crespo during the Legalist Revolution , in which nearly ten thousand people died, going into exile. He later served as chancellor during the dictatorship of Cipriano Castro.

== Background ==
Presidential mandates were two years with no possibility of reelection, a rule favored by Antonio Guzmán Blanco, who also preferred to be succeeded by a civilian, as had happened with Juan Pablo Rojas Paúl. This first civilian government in a long time was widely accepted by society, but Rojas Paúl's health declined, prompting an election in which Andueza, representing the state of Zamora and also a civilian, was elected.

President Andueza sent a public letter to Joaquín Crespo, who had declined his senatorial seat and sent his substitute. Crespo replied that he would accept Andueza's mandate as long as there were no constitutional reforms.

== Cabinet ==
The cabinet of President Andueza Palacio consisted of the following:

Office	Minister
Interior	Sebastián Casañas
Foreign Affairs	Marco Antonio Saluzzo
Foreign Affairs	Feliciano Acevedo
Foreign Affairs	Manuel Clemente Urbaneja
War and Navy	Julio F. Sarría
Development	Francisco Batalla
Treasury	Vicente Coronado
Public Credit	José Tadeo Monagas Oriach
Public Works	Santiago Terrero Atienza
Public Education	Eduardo Blanco
Presidential Secretary	Juan Francisco Bustillos
Governor of Caracas	Naphtalí Urdaneta

== Domestic policy ==
=== Legislative policy ===
On April 9, 1891, the constitution was reformed; the government was approved a project that enabled Congress to make amendments to the constitution without the need to convene a constituent assembly, and the name of the former Guzmán Blanco state was changed to Miranda state, and the Great State of Falcón was again divided into Zulia and Falcón states.

On June 25, 1891, the government presented a constitutional reform project to bring back the twenty states, enable the possibility of presidential reelection for extended periods of four years, together with direct and secret universal suffrage, inspired by the 1864 constitution.

=== Judicial policy ===
On October 26, 1891, former president Juan Pablo Rojas Paúl was expelled from the country for refusing to accept a post abroad.

=== Defense ===
President Andueza increased the contingent of troops to 5,000 men in 1891 and reinstated the Military Academy. He also emphasized to Congress the need to acquire a battleship.

=== Economics ===
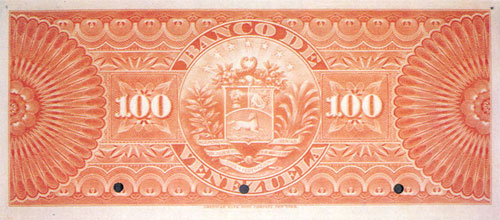
Reverse of a 100 bolívar banknote from 1890

During this time there was a great economic boom due to rising coffee prices. The national budget reached a record figure of 53,719,804 bolívars.

=== Education ===
By presidential decree in 1891, Andueza Palacio converted the Federal College of Maracaibo into the University of Zulia.

=== Infrastructure ===
Works such as the Barquisimeto aqueduct in 1890, the Aroa–Barquisimeto railway section, and the Vargas Hospital in Caracas in 1891 were completed and inaugurated.

=== Media policy ===
The government created the Ministry of Posts and Telegraphs on June 27, 1891.

=== Immigration ===
In 1891, a law was enacted in Venezuela to prohibit the entry of "non-white" foreigners. The law, sanctioned on August 11, 1891, stated: "Persons of Asian nationality or from the British and Dutch Antilles shall not be contracted or accepted as immigrants." Despite the law's approval, a large number of Caribbean, Chinese, and some Indian migrants continued to enter the country to work as farmers and miners.

== Foreign Policy ==
In the international arena, the administration of Andueza Palacio suffered the severe setback of the Spanish Award, regarding the territories of Venezuela and the claims made by the government to Colombia, considered a defeat for the country by the government and public opinion of that time.

== Legalist Revolution ==
The Legalist Revolution was a civil war in Venezuela that was caused by the "Continuity movement" of President Raimundo Andueza Palacios who wanted to perpetuate himself in power through a constitutional reform. Although it was constitutionally stipulated that his term would end on 20 February 1892, Andueza planned to reform the Constitution in order to prolong his stay in power for two more years, which is why he was called a Continuationist.

Joaquín Crespo took up arms on March 11 in his power base of "El Totumo", in Guárico state, starting the war that spread to the rest of the country. The government appointed General Sebastián Casañas, commander of the army, to fight the Revolution while Generals Ramón Guerra, Wenceslao Casado and José Manuel Hernández, known as "El Mocho Hernández", joined the Legalist movement of Joaquin Crespo.

== See also ==
- Presidency of Juan Pablo Rojas Paúl
- Second presidency of Joaquín Crespo
