= Monagato =

Period of Venezuelan history (1847–1858)

The Monagato, also known as the Liberal Oligarchy or the dictatorship of the Monagas brothers, was a historical period in Venezuela that began on March 1, 1847, with the assumption of José Tadeo Monagas as president of Venezuela after his victory in the 1846 presidential election, and ended on March 15, 1858, with the triumph of the March Revolution.

== Background ==
After the death of Rafael Urdaneta, José Antonio Páez decided to support his former rival José Tadeo Monagas in the 1846 presidential election representing the Conservative Party. The 1846 peasant insurrection led by Ezequiel Zamora and "Indio" Rangel caused the arrest and disqualification of Antonio Leocadio Guzmán, the main candidate of the Liberal Party. Monagas won the election and assumed the presidency on March 1, 1847.

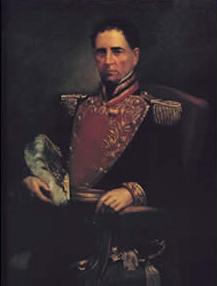
José Tadeo Monagas

== First presidency of José Tadeo Monagas ==
The first act of José Tadeo Monagas's government was to appoint José Antonio Páez as Chief of Operations against the rebels. "Indio" Rangel continued attacks against the government, defeating Julián Castro at Los Leones. Juan Bautista Rodríguez managed to defeat Rangel, who retreated and was soon killed in an ambush. On March 26, Ezequiel Zamora was captured and sentenced to death; however, on November 5, José Tadeo Monagas commuted his death sentence to 10 years in prison, but during a transfer, Zamora escaped from authorities and hid in El Hatillo.

Conservative figures such as José María Carreño, Andrés Narvarte, José María Vargas, and Ángel Quintero served in the government. However, the large number of pardons, amnesties, and safe-conducts granted to political enemies from the Conservative Party, such as Pedro Vicente Aguado, the most controversial episode of which was the commutation of Antonio Leocadio Guzmán's death sentence to perpetual exile, provoked an internal crisis in the government, leading to the resignation of nearly all the conservative ministers, with the exception of José María Carreño, who would also resign shortly thereafter.

José Tadeo Monagas soon began appointing personal friends and members of the Liberal Party to important government and military positions, including Tomás José Sanabria y Meleán, who was appointed Minister of Interior, and José Félix Blanco as Secretary of State, though he was quickly replaced by Fermín Toro. All of this provoked opposition from the Conservative Party, and José Antonio Páez began to consider Monagas a traitor.

=== Storming of the National Congress ===
After a series of measures considered arbitrary by his adversaries, the Conservative Party, which controlled Congress, decided to impeach President José Tadeo Monagas. However, liberal brawls broke out in Congress, leading to a confrontation that left three deputies dead, Santos Michelena was seriously wounded and died shortly thereafter, along with four militiamen killed and a tailor involved in the brawl.These events led to the acclamation of José Tadeo Monagas, who managed to subdue Congress and impose his personal power.

The new Congress, compliant with the executive branch, granted extraordinary powers to the president. On January 27, a general amnesty was issued for all liberal caudillos who had been convicted by the conservative government, including Ezequiel Zamora. Antonio Leocadio Guzmán was made Minister of Interior and Justice and later vice president, and Ezequiel Zamora was appointed army commander. Word spread of uprisings rejecting the government in the provinces of Margarita, Cumaná, Guayana, Apure, Maracaibo, Coro, Trujillo, and Mérida. The president immediately authorized provincial governors to independently arrange loans of up to 30,000 pesos to maintain their loyalty. On January 30, mandatory military service was decreed, and Santiago Mariño and José Gregorio Monagas were appointed chief and deputy chief of the army, respectively.

=== Civil War of 1848 ===
José Antonio Páez took up arms on February 1, 1848, in Calabozo, aiming to restore institutional order. General José Cornelio Muñoz defeated Páez at the Battle of Los Araguatos, forcing the latter into exile in Curaçao. The insurgents were periodically defeated; José María Zamora accepted a presidential pardon, while Judas Tadeo Piñango was killed. Ezequiel Zamora fought José Escolástico Andrade and later supported Carlo Castelli in the siege of Maracaibo alongside Justo Briceño Otálora and José María García, who defeated the rebels.

On June 21, 1848, a group commanded by Lorenzo Belisario attacked the presidential guard at José Tadeo Monagas's house. Belisario was wounded when stepped on by his own horse, leading his companions to believe he was dead, causing them to flee. Juan Antonio Sotillo defeated Felipe Macero and later the Belisario brothers, Lorenzo and Nicasio, at the Manapire crossing on July 17; Sotillo decapitated their bodies and sent the heads to President José Tadeo Monagas.

José Antonio Páez, who had returned to the country in 1849, was defeated at the Battle of Casupo and forced to capitulate at Macapo before General José Laurencio Silva. Joaquín Herrera imprisoned all the insurgents.

=== End of the first presidency of José Tadeo Monagas ===
On April 3, 1849, the Law on Conspirators was amended, abolishing the death penalty for political reasons. The economic destabilization resulting from the severe agricultural crisis affecting the country led to shortages.

The prolonged situation of scarcity and speculation, along with the decline in prices of exportable products, created an atmosphere of unrest throughout the territory. Social discontent began to be reflected in the proliferation of smuggling bands. The government's inability to adequately protect the provinces and the right to private property, as well as a lack of confidence in the existing policies, accelerated the process of social disintegration. The governor of Barinas Province, Napoleón Sebastián Arteaga, was dismissed for failing to approve the Campo Monagas Treaty; he was accused of conspiracy and expatriated. During the government of José Tadeo Monagas, press freedom was restricted, several newspapers were closed, and the practice of imprisonment as a mechanism of repression became standardized.

== Presidency of José Gregorio Monagas ==
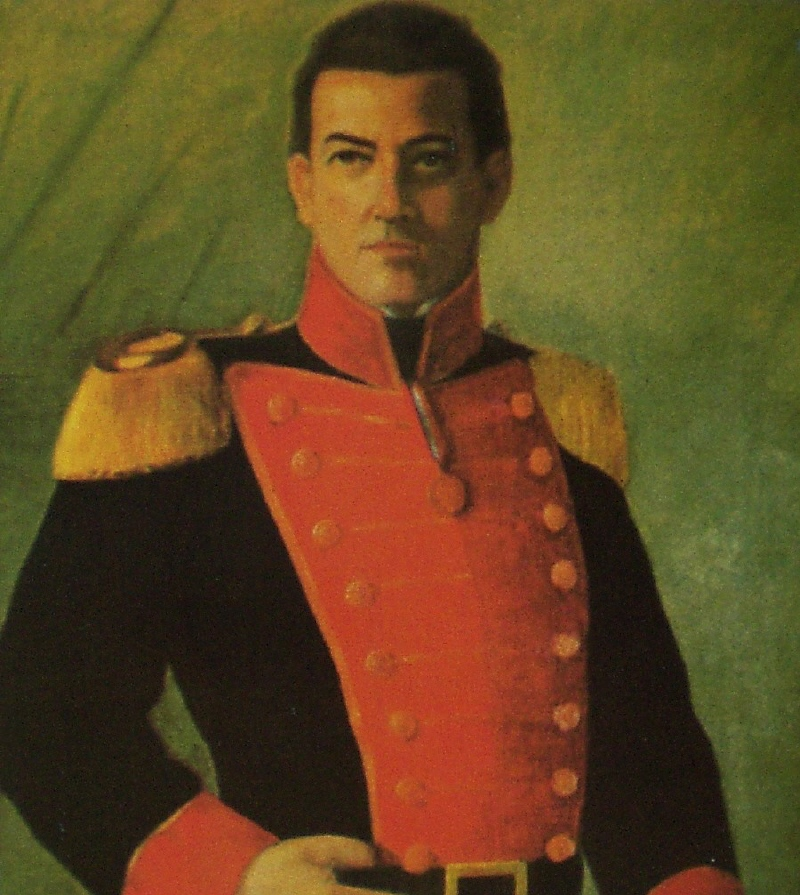
José Gregorio Monagas

For the 1850 Venezuelan presidential election, José Tadeo Monagas had planned to support Tomás José Sanabria y Meleán. However, upon the latter's death, he supported his brother José Gregorio Monagas, who won the election thanks to his brother's influence. His election represented a case of blatant nepotism; he finally assumed office in 1851.

Although the government's followers divided into "Gregorianos" and "Tadeístas", such a division did not occur between the brothers. In 1851, the Gregorianos initiated a process against two of José Tadeo Monagas's secretaries of state, accusing them of corruption in the acquisition of a warship; they were later acquitted. Between 1853 and 1854, the Barquisimeto rebellion broke out and was quickly defeated. Julián Castro was appointed governor of Carabobo due to his actions against that rebellion.

During the Monagato, conciliatory measures were enacted, such as exemptions from military service for certain individuals, rules to prevent mistreatment of soldiers by their commanders, and an amnesty for deserting militiamen. In 1854, a new national militia law was approved, establishing exemptions, recruitment methods, and sanctions for those who refused. The Monagas also promoted the expulsion of opposition officers and encouraged the enlistment of those loyal to their regime.

As a memorable act, Monagas signed the Law of Abolition of Slavery in 1854, freeing 23,378 people held in slavery. This act stripped the opposition of a political rallying flag. That same year, the first Mining Code of Venezuela was created, and a cholera epidemic caused hundreds of deaths.

External debt increased, as did corruption during this period, public credit was greatly depressed, and officials' salaries were paid late.

== Second presidency of José Tadeo Monagas ==
In the 1854 Venezuelan presidential election, José Tadeo Monagas received almost all the votes, with only one vote in favor of Fermín Toro. On January 26, 1855, he appointed Joaquín Herrera as vice president and José Laurencio Silva and Silvestre Guevara y Lira as state councilors. Multiple resignations occurred in the cabinet, including that of Laurencio Silva.

The cholera epidemic led to the establishment of charity boards and health commissions. In 1855, Venezuela's first telegraph line was laid. That same year, he unsuccessfully attempted to create a Gran Colombian confederation, and the expulsion of Jews from Coro occurred. Under the pretext of creating a fourth power, the municipal power, he sanctioned the Constitution of 1857, which extended the presidential term to six years, allowed reelection, and fully centralized the state organization.

Amid this tumultuous political landscape, the Congress of Venezuela sanctioned an amnesty decree on February 4, 1858, for all political exiles from 1848 onward, but the decree was quickly rendered void due to the regime's fall shortly thereafter.

== March Revolution ==
In March 1858, an alliance between conservatives led by Manuel Felipe de Tovar, Fermín Toro, Mauricio Berrizbeitia, and José Ramón Yepes, and liberals led by Wenceslao Urrutia and Nicolás Brito, initiated a revolution against José Tadeo Monagas, led by Julián Castro, who recruited Joaquín Herrera. Juan José Flores and Juan Crisóstomo Falcón refused to participate but also did not denounce the conspiracy. Julián Castro seized power and called for the National Convention of Valencia. Tadeo and his brother José Gregorio Monagas sought political asylum, bringing the Monagato to an end.

== See also ==
- Gobierno de los Azules
