= Joaquín Herrera =

Venezuelan military officer and politician

Vice President of Venezuela
- In office 1851–1855
- Preceded by: Antonio Leocadio Guzmán
- Succeeded by: Manuel Felipe de Tovar
- President: José Gregorio Monagas

Provisional President of Venezuela
- In office 20 January 1855 – 30 January 1855
- Preceded by: José Gregorio Monagas
- Succeeded by: José Tadeo Monagas

Minister of Foreign Affairs of Venezuela
- In office 17 September 1851 – 27 January 1853
- President: José Gregorio Monagas
- Preceded by: Francisco Aranda
- Succeeded by: Ramón Yepes

Personal details
- Died: 1868
- Party: Liberal Party

José Joaquín Herrera (1784-1868) was a Venezuelan military and politician, president of Carabobo from 1846 to 1854, and in 1855 he was appointed provisional president of Venezuela from 20 January 1855 until 30 January 1855 in the succession of power between José Gregorio Monagas and his brother José Tadeo Monagas. He served as the vice president of Venezuela from 1851 until 1855.

== Biography ==
José Joaquín Herrera was born in 1784 in the city of Valencia. From a "humble" family, in his youth he enlisted in the militia fighting for independence. He was involved in the military between April 1810 and July 1811.

After Venezuela separated from Colombia, he participated in the local government of the state of Carabobo, serving as state governor from 1846 until 1854. In 1849, he was involved in the capture of José Antonio Páez in the uprising against José Tadeo Monagas. In January 1855, he temporarily held the position of president, while elections were held. Liberal in his political leanings, Herrera died in Caracas in 1868, at the age of 84.

== See also ==
- Vice President of Venezuela
- List of presidents of Venezuela
- List of ministers of foreign affairs of Venezuela

Political offices
| Preceded by Francisco Aranda | Minister of Foreign Affairs of Venezuela; 17 September 1851 - 27 January 1853 | Succeeded by Ramón Yepes |
| Preceded by Antonio Leocadio Guzmán | Vice President of Venezuela; 1851-1855 | Succeeded by Manuel Felipe de Tovar |
| Preceded by José Gregorio Monagas | Provisional President of Venezuela; 20 January 1855 - 30 January 1855 | Succeeded by José Tadeo Monagas |
