= President Castro =

President Castro may refer to:

- Cipriano Castro (1858–1924), president of Venezuela from 1899 to 1908
- Fidel Castro (1926–2016), president of the Council of State of Cuba from 1976 to 2008
- José María Castro Madriz (1818–1892), president of Costa Rica from 1847 to 1849
- Julián Castro (1812–1875), president of Venezuela between 1858 and 1859
- Raúl Castro (born 1931), president of the Council of State of Cuba from 2008 to 2018 and brother of Fidel Castro
- Xiomara Castro (born 1959), president of Honduras from 2022 to present
