= Presidency of Manuel Felipe de Tovar =

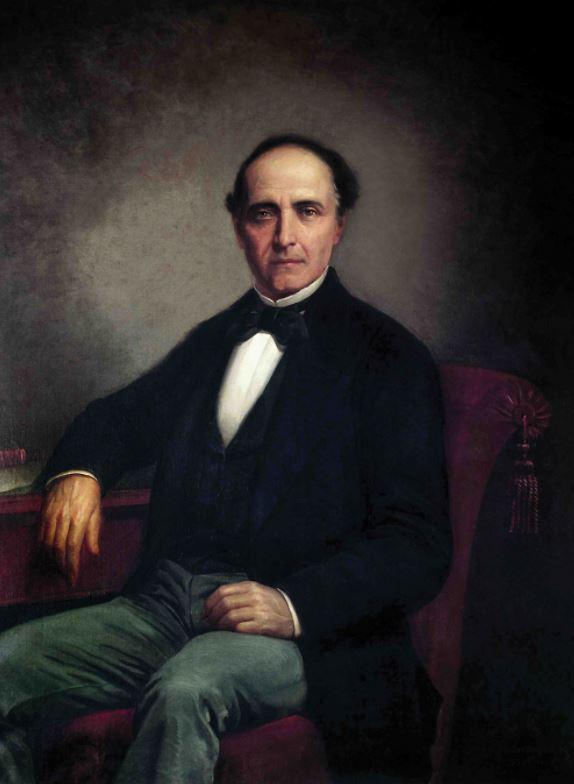
Manuel Felipe de Tovar.

The presidency of Manuel Felipe de Tovar (1859–1861) consisted of two administrations: the first as interim president in 1859 following his assumption of the vice presidency, and the second as the first president elected by direct male suffrage in Venezuela's history, taking office in 1860 after the ousting and arrest of Julián Castro during the Federal War. Tovar resigned the following year amid a political crisis.

== Background ==
President Julián Castro had come to power during the March Revolution (1858) but was arrested the following year (1859). Vice President Pedro Gual temporarily assumed office until elections were held, in which Manuel Felipe de Tovar defeated Pedro Gual and José Antonio Páez.

== Domestic policy ==
=== Economics ===
The Tovar administration implemented several important economic measures during 1860. On May 15, a presidential decree authorized obtaining a loan of 6 million pesos to address fiscal needs. The following month, on June 15, Congress passed legislation establishing an income tax. Five days later, on June 20, the government created the Public Credit Directorate to oversee financial matters. On July 6, lawmakers approved legislation repealing an 1850 law regarding debt settlements and bankruptcy proceedings.

=== Alimentation ===
On July 7, 1860, a decree was issued authorizing the presidency to permit the temporary free importation of corn, rice, legumes, potatoes, salted meat, and lard.

=== Labor ===
On the same date, July 7, 1860, a decree was approved establishing the annual salaries of high-ranking officials, setting it at 12,000 pesos for the president and 4,000 pesos for the vice president."

== See also ==
- Federal War
