= First presidency of Joaquín Crespo =

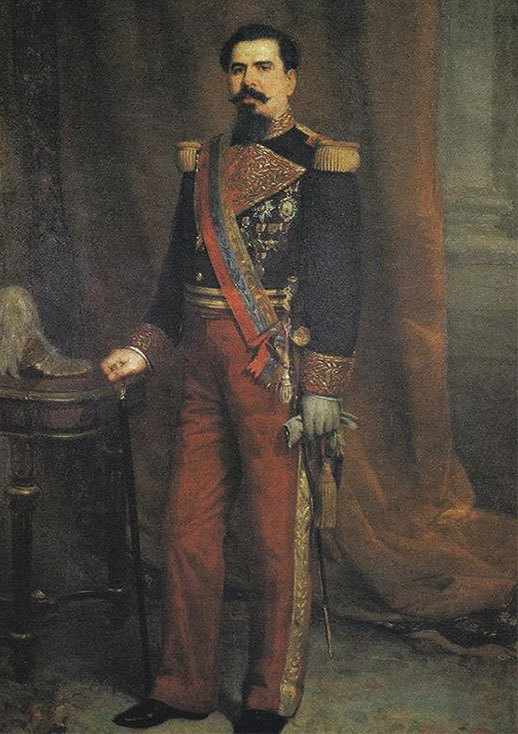
Joaquín Crespo

The first presidency of Joaquín Crespo (1884–1886) was elected by the Venezuelan Federal Council in 1884 and operated under the political hegemony of Antonio Guzmán Blanco. Following this biennium, Crespo was later succeeded by Guzmán Blanco himself. Crespo would later return to power during the Legalist Revolution (1892), ruling until 1898.

== Background ==
In the 1884 elections, following the recommendation of dictator Antonio Guzmán Blanco, the Federal Council unanimously elected Joaquín Crespo over other candidates, including Juan Pablo Rojas Paúl and General Venancio Pulgar. Crespo was a loyal ally of Guzmán Blanco. After the election, Guzmán Blanco departed for Europe, serving as extraordinary ambassador and plenipotentiary minister to London and later Paris.

== Cabinet ==
Members of Guzmán Blanco's informal "Círculo de la Adoración Perpetua" Francisco González Guinán, Juan Pablo Rojas Paúl, and Andrés Simón Ibarra were initially appointed to the executive cabinet. However, they were replaced on 15 December 1884 by Vicente Amengual, José Antonio Velutini, Bernardino Mirabal, and General Víctor Barret de Nazaris.

== Domestic policy ==
=== Economy ===
Crespo's administration faced a global economic crisis, exacerbated by a locust plague that triggered famine. The government responded by authorizing duty-free grain imports, implementing a 25% salary reduction for public employees and addressing declining coffee production. The national fiscal deficit (1885–1886) ballooned to Bs. 3,646,822, prompting the issuance of public debt bonds at 1% interest.

=== Transportation ===
Due to fiscal constraints, public works spending was cut by Bs. 3 million, though the Puerto Cabello and Valencia Railway was inaugurated in 1885.

=== Education ===
The Central University of Venezuela (UCV) was temporarily closed in February 1886 following student unrest.

== Foreign policy ==
Diplomatic relations with France were restored during this period.

== Aftermath ==
The Federal Council re-elected Antonio Guzmán Blanco for a third term, but he left the country before completing his mandate, delegating power to Hermógenes López. Crespo proposed a rotating presidency arrangement with Guzmán Blanco, which was rejected. This led to a political rift, with Guzmán instead supporting Juan Pablo Rojas Paúl's 1888 presidential bid. Crespo subsequently moved to Spain.

== Opposition ==
The newspapers La Conciencia Pública and El Eco Libre were the government's most vocal critics. In 1885, General Venancio Pulgar, a former presidential rival, launched an invasion from Carúpano, which was defeated at a cost of Bs. 2.7 million, further straining the national budget.

== See also ==
- Second presidency of Joaquín Crespo
- Guzmanato
