= Presidency of Juan Pablo Rojas Paúl =

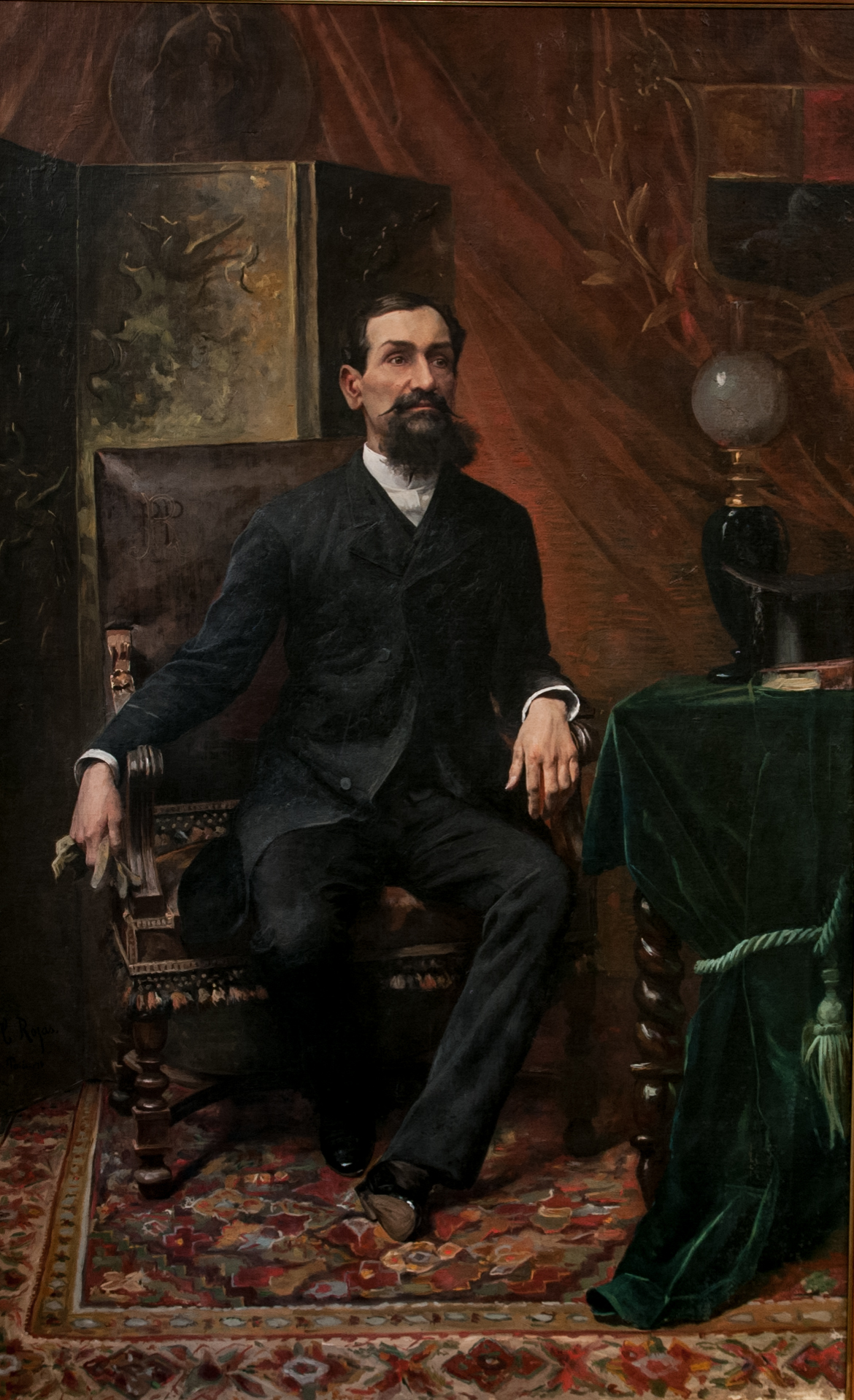
Juan Pablo Rojas Paúl

Juan Pablo Rojas Paúl (1888–1890) was elected by the Federal States with the approval of dictator Antonio Guzmán Blanco, marking a shift within the Liberal Party as its second civilian administration and the first to be elected rather than appointed. This period represented a gradual departure from Guzmán Blanco's political influence.

== Background ==
The dictatorship of Antonio Guzmán Blanco had governed Venezuela through the Liberal Party, which suppressed opposition. By 1888, Guzmán Blanco had grown unpopular and distrusted the political ambitions of former president Joaquín Crespo. He consequently convened a party convention to select a successor. Among five candidates, Juan Pablo Rojas Paúl, an experienced lawyer, was elected with six votes. Both Crespo and Guzmán Blanco subsequently left the country to avoid political conflicts; for Guzmán, this marked his permanent exit from Venezuela.

== Domestic policy ==
=== Economy ===
The administration benefited from a boom in coffee prices, which strengthened the national economy.

=== Infrastructure ===
Rojas Paúl's administration prioritized infrastructure, completing projects initiated by Antonio Guzmán Blanco and launching new initiatives, including the construction of roads and the Hospital Vargas.

=== Education ===
Rojas Paúl reduced tensions with the Catholic Church, which had been strained under Antonio Guzmán Blanco. His government permitted the establishment of ecclesiastical science faculties in national colleges in Maracaibo and Barquisimeto, as well as the arrival of French nuns (Sisters of St. Joseph of Tarbes) to open a girls' school in Caracas.

== Foreign policy ==
In July 1888, the government inaugurated the La Guaira-French Antilles-Europe submarine telegraph cable, enhancing international communications.
