= Interim government of Wolfgang Larrazábal =

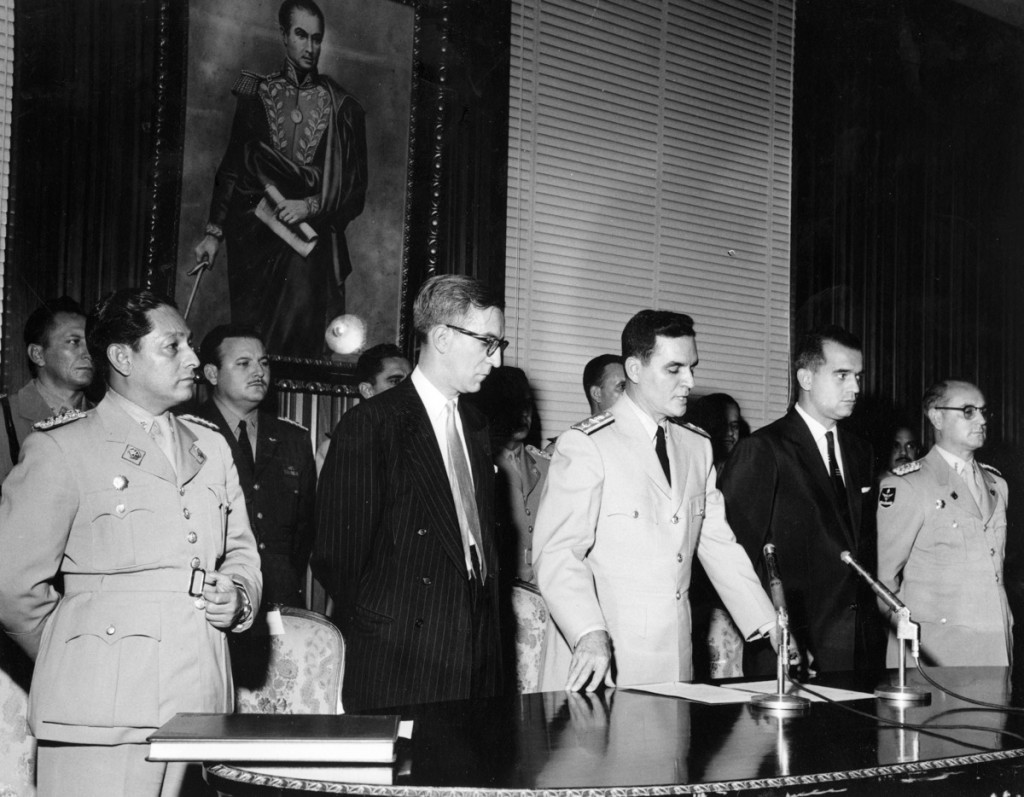
Members of the Government Junta. From left to right: Colonel Pedro José Quevedo, Junta Secretary Édgar Sanabria, Rear Admiral Wolfgang Larrazábal, Blas Lamberti, and Colonel Carlos Luis Araque

The interim government of Wolfgang Larrazábal of the self‑styled Government Junta was a transitional government following the dictatorship of Marcos Pérez Jiménez after the civic‑military coup of January 23, 1958, and lasted from that date until November 14.

The appointment of Rear Admiral Wolfgang Larrazábal as president of the Government Junta by the rebel officers was a concession to the civilian sector, discontented with the outcome of the military dictatorship, at a delicate political juncture.

At the economic and labor level, he carried out his Emergency Plan, which involved mass hiring for the completion of unfinished public works at that time.

At the defense level, he suffered the boycott of his minister Jesús María Castro León, who left the cabinet and unsuccessfully called for the outlawing of the political parties Democratic Action and the Communist Party and for the postponement of elections by three years, and also dealt with a failed military uprising in September.

His security policy included the closure of the National Security Directorate, which would later allow for the prosecution of its officials for crimes committed during the dictatorship.

At the electoral level, Wolfgang Larrazábal legalized the outlawed political parties and ran in the 1958 presidential elections; to campaign, he handed over his position to a civilian, Edgar Sanabria, losing to former AD president Rómulo Betancourt.

== 1958 coup d'état ==
On January 23, after Pérez Jiménez fled into exile, the Caracas radio stations, which generally did not broadcast at midnight, began to spread the news. The military prisoners who had been detained since January 1 were freed by the people themselves.

== Cabinet ==
Two days after Larrazábal's government took office, Colonels Roberto Casanova and Abel Romero Villate, identified as Pérez Jiménez supporters, were removed from the Government Junta, which would have been a demonstration of trust toward the civilian sector.

== Domestic policy ==
=== Electoral policy ===
Among the first measures adopted by the Government Junta was the granting of full freedom of action to political parties regardless of their ideology. Outlawed political parties were legalized and the return of exiles, such as Rómulo Betancourt, Rafael Caldera, Jóvito Villalba, and Gustavo Machado, was permitted.

=== Labor and Infrastructure ===
He decreed the 1958 Emergency Plan to address the economic situation, in particular the rise in unemployment caused by the halt of some public works from the dictatorship of Marcos Pérez Jiménez, as well as by the mass exodus from the interior of the country to the capital.

=== Judicial and Human Rights ===
He eliminated the National Security Directorate, which led to the capture and prosecution of several of its officials. The assets of ministers and prominent members of the dictatorship of Marcos Pérez Jiménez were confiscated, and journalists and other collaborators of the dictatorship were sanctioned, with the government recommending that they leave the country as high‑policy measures aimed at safeguarding the tranquility and peace of the nation. Investigations into the murders of Leonardo Ruiz Pineda and Antonio Pinto Salinas were also reopened.

=== Education ===
Larrazábal's government decreed on March 21, 1958, the reopening of the University of Carabobo, which took place on October 11 of that year.

== See also ==
- Military dictatorship in Venezuela
- Interim government of Edgar Sanabria
