= José Gregorio Monagas Municipality =

José Gregorio Monagas Municipality Municipio José Gregorio Monagas
- Municipality
- Flag Coat of arms

- Location in Anzoátegui

- Location in Venezuela
- Coordinates: 8°12′54″N 64°52′08″W
- Country: Venezuela
- State: Anzoátegui
- Municipal seat: Mapire[*]

Government
  - Mayor: Luis Silva Lara (PSUV)

Area
  - Total: 9,616.7 km^{2} (3,713.0 sq mi)

Population (2011)
  - Total: 17,534
  - Density: 1.8233/km^{2} (4.7223/sq mi)
- Time zone: UTC−4 (VET)
- Area code(s): 0283
- Website: Official website

The José Gregorio Monagas Municipality is one of the 21 municipalities (municipios) that makes up the eastern Venezuelan state of Anzoátegui and, according to the 2011 census by the National Institute of Statistics of Venezuela, the municipality has a population of 17,534. The town of Mapire is the shire town of the José Gregorio Monagas Municipality. The municipality is named for the nineteenth century Venezuelan President José Gregorio Monagas.

== Demographics ==
The José Gregorio Monagas Municipality, according to a 2007 population estimate by the National Institute of Statistics of Venezuela, has a population of 18,154 (up from 16,533 in 2000). This amounts to 1.2% of the state's population. The municipality's population density is 1.98 inhabitants per square kilometre (5.1/sq mi).

== Government ==
The mayor of the José Gregorio Monagas Municipality is Cruz Ojeda, elected on 23 November 2008 with 54% of the vote. He replaced Rafael Ángel Puerta Alvarez shortly after the elections. The municipality is divided into six parishes; Capital José Gregorio Monagas, Piar, San Diego de Cabrutica, Santa Clara, Uverito, and Zuata.
