= Second presidency of Joaquín Crespo =

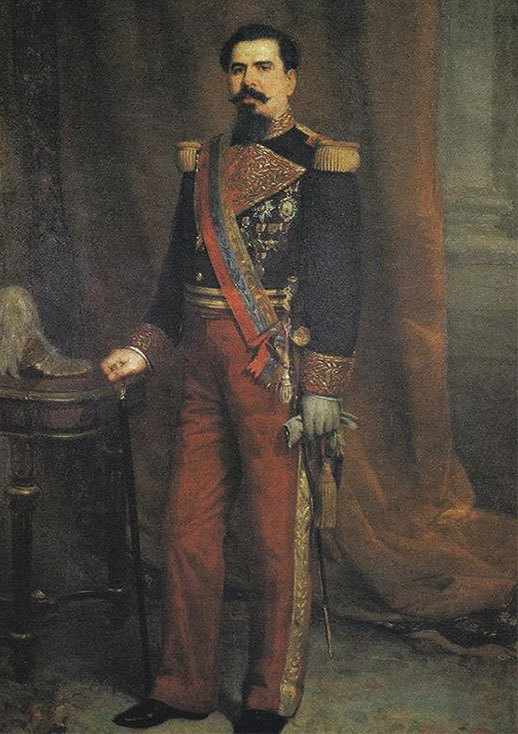
Joaquín Crespo

The second presidency of Joaquín Crespo began as a de facto administration following the Legalist Revolution, in which Raimundo Andueza Palacio was overthrown. His government was legalized after the Constituent Assembly of 1893, and the following year he won the presidential elections. Crespo led the last government of the Liberal Party that completed its full term, being succeeded by the presidency of Ignacio Andrade in 1898.

Joaquín Crespo had previously served as president of Venezuela between 1884 and 1886, under the influence of Antonio Guzmán Blanco.

== Background ==
=== First presidency of Crespo ===
Joaquín Crespo had been president of Venezuela between 1884 and 1886 as a member of the Liberal Party thanks to the support of dictator Antonio Guzmán Blanco. Crespo proposed to Guzmán that they rotate the presidency every two years, but Guzmán did not accept, instead supporting Juan Pablo Rojas Paúl in 1888, which caused a rift between the two.

=== Legalist Revolution ===
With an army of approximately ten thousand soldiers, the so-called Legalist Revolution, which aimed to uphold the constitution and prevent the president's reelection, was successful, and Crespo took control of the executive branch.

== Domestic policy ==
=== Legislative policy ===
==== National Constituent Assembly of 1893 ====
Elections for a National Constituent Assembly were called in 1893, which ratified Crespo as president of Venezuela.

==== Constitution of 1893 ====
The Constitution of the United States of Venezuela of 1893 was sanctioned on June 12, 1893, by the National Constituent Assembly and promulgated by President Crespo a few days later. This constitution reduced the electoral term to four years and prohibited indefinite reelection.

=== Education ===
By decree, President Crespo designated the Federal College of Valencia as the University of Valencia.

== Foreign policy ==
The British Empire made incursions into Venezuelan territory, attempting to reestablish the borders up to the Yuruari River, an action that was prevented by Venezuelan soldiers. The matter led to conflicts with the United Kingdom, culminating in the invocation of the Monroe Doctrine by United States President Grover Cleveland. In 1897, the Americans and British imposed an international arbitration, with a tribunal composed of two English lawyers, two Americans, and one Russian, without any Venezuelan representation.

== 1894 presidential election ==
The 1894 presidential election took place in February 1894 to elect the new president of Venezuela for the 1894-1898 period.
