= 2009 Venezuelan constitutional referendum =

Referendum on term limits

- 15 February 2009
- Do you approve the amendment of articles 160, 162, 174, 192 and 230 of the Constitution of the Republic, processed by the National Assembly, which broadens the political rights of the people, in order to allow any citizen in exercise of a position of popular election, can be subject to nomination as a candidate for the same position, for the time established by the Constitution, depending his possible election, exclusively, on the popular vote?

Results
Choice	Votes	%
Yes	6,319,636	54.87%
No	5,198,006	45.13%
Valid votes	11,517,642	98.24%
Invalid or blank votes	206,582	1.76%
Total votes	11,724,224	100.00%
Registered voters/turnout	16,767,511	69.92%
Yes
50-60%
60-70%
70-80%
No
50-60%

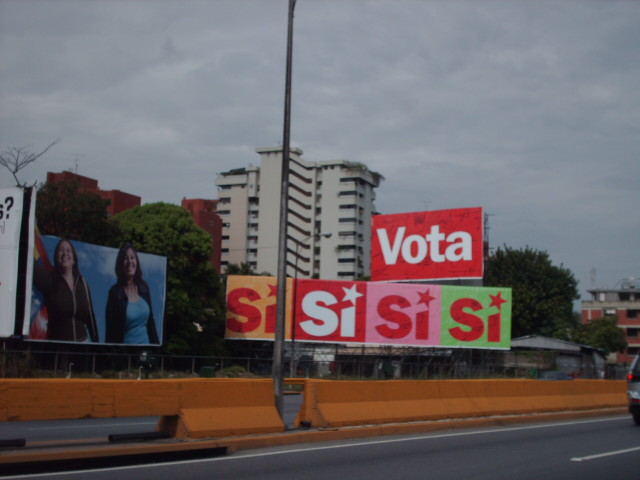
Billboards supporting the Yes campaign in Caracas

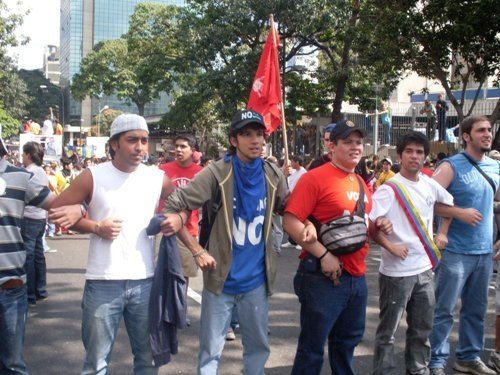
Students protesting against the referendum in Caracas on 19 January 2009

A constitutional referendum was held in Venezuela on 15 February 2009 for voters to approve or reject Amendment No. 1 of the constitution, which abolished term limits for the offices of president, state governors, mayors and National Assembly deputies.

The constitution, enacted in 1999 by referendum, previously established a three-term limit for deputies and a two-term limit for the other offices. The proposed amendment was endorsed by 54% of the electorate, with approximately 70% of registered voters participating. Upon having his term limits removed, Chávez promised his supporters that he would lead Venezuela until 2030, though he would later die as president in 2013.

== Background ==
A proposal for an important change in the main structure of the Constitution, that included abolishing presidential term limits among major social, economical and political changes was rejected in 2007 when university students led protests and played a critical role in the result; President Hugo Chávez had said the reform was needed to implement his socialist program. Chávez conceded defeat by saying "for now, we couldn't" ("por ahora no pudimos"), echoing the phrase he used after the failure of his February 1992 attempted coup d'état against the Carlos Andrés Pérez government.

On 30 November 2008, six days after broadening support in regional elections, Hugo Chávez decided that it was the opportunity to seek continuous presidential terms, announcing on television that he would be open to a new wave of discussion on the proposal for allowing the postulation without limits to presidential candidature. A National Electoral Council supportive of Chávez quickly accepted elections, scheduling the referendum a little over a month after the regional elections for February 2009.

The following day, his supporters started working towards a constitutional amendment for this goal. Chávez utilized successful managers from PDVSA to lead his referendum campaign. He also offered the abolition of term limits to governors and other officials who supported his removal of term limits. The Chávez administration then distributed many free kitchen and household appliances to his supporters beside flyers stating "Chávez loves us and love is repaid with love" and "Chávez is incapable of doing us harm".

== Provisions of the amendment ==
The full title of the law was Amendment No. 1 of the Constitution of the Bolivarian Republic of Venezuela (Enmienda No. 1 de la Constitucion de Republica Bolivariana de Venezuela). It was approved by a majority of the members of the National Assembly. The United Socialist Party of Venezuela (Chávez's political party) states that the initiative was backed by more than six million people. The amendment affects Articles 160, 162, 174, 192 and 230 of the constitution. They are amended as follows:

Previous	Current
Article 160: The governor shall be elected for a four-year term by the majority of the votes cast. The governor may be re-elected immediately and only once for one more term.	Article 160: The governor shall be elected for a four-year term by the majority of the votes cast. The governor may be re-elected.
Article 162: The regional legislators shall be elected for a maximum of two terms in a row.	Article 162: The regional legislators may be re-elected.
Article 174: The mayor shall be elected for a four-year term by the majority of the votes cast and may be re-elected immediately and only once for one more term.	Article 174: The mayor shall be elected for a four-year term by the majority of the votes cast and may be re-elected.
Article 192: The deputies for the National Assembly are elected for a five-year term with the possibility of re-election for a maximum of two terms in a row.	Article 192: The deputies for the National Assembly are elected for a five-year term with the possibility of re-election.
Article 230: The presidential term of office lasts six years. The President of the Republic may be re-elected immediately and only once for one more term.	Article 230: The presidential term of office lasts six years. The President of the Republic may be re-elected.

Article 341 of the constitution, which governs amendments, states that "amendments shall be numbered consecutively and shall be published beneath the Constitution without altering the text of the latter". Therefore, the 2009 amendment has not altered the original text of the constitution. Rather, Amendment No.1 (including new texts for each of the five amended articles) is published below the original text as a codicil.

== Campaign ==
Henry Ramos Allup, secretary general of the opposition party Acción Democrática called the proposal "'illegal and unconstitutional' because Article 345 says that 'A revised constitutional reform initiative may not be submitted during the same constitutional term of office of the National Assembly.'" Chávez avoided this issue by declaring that the change to the constitution would be in the form of an amendment, instead of a constitutional reform. In addition, the constitutional amendment was re-defined to apply to all popular elected positions, not just to the president. Elenis Rodríguez Martínez, a leader of the opposition party Primero Justicia, stated that the proposed change constitutes a fundamental change to the constitution, and therefore cannot be voted as an amendment. She stated that, "Under Article 340, 'the purpose of an amendment is to add to or modify one or more articles of the Constitution, without altering the fundamental structure of the same.' When the president says that he wants to delete some words from Article 230 of the Constitution, he is lying, because he really wants to remove an essential part of the text and in doing so he is altering its structure, as well as part of the provisions of Article 6, which reads that 'the government of the Bolivarian Republic of Venezuela is ... alternating' (...) This is a camouflaged reform." However, the Constitutional Court ruled that such a change was within the scope of a constitutional amendment, and that such an amendment could be re-attempted each year. The editors of Venezuelan publishing house Veneconomy argue that the 15 February date is too soon to comply with time-frames set forth by the suffrage law and related laws for the registration of voters newly turned-18 and for the organization of polling stations.

Students again took a leading role in protests, as they did in the campaign against the 2007 referendum. On 16 January students blocked a Caracas highway, burned trees and taunted the police. After viewing video of the protests, Chávez gave the order: "Throw lots of (tear) gas at them, and take them prisoner for me. If you don't, I'm going to go after the authorities responsible." Tensions rose in advance of the referendum, with a group of 40 armed men taking over the Caracas city hall, to which an opposition mayor had been elected in November, and declaring the building "recovered for the revolution". Tear gas was also thrown at the compound of the papal nuncio, who had granted asylum to an anti-Chávez student leader accused of sexual assault; and an anti-Chávez student leader's car was burned.

== Conduct ==
Around 100 international observers were accredited to observe the vote, but neither the Organization of American States nor the European Union had official observers in Venezuela. Observers from Latin American nations, European Parliament members, and European academics said that the ballot had been free and fair. The United States Department of State spokesman Noel Clay praised the "civic spirit" of the referendum. He added that it was important that elected officials in Venezuela focused on "governing democratically".

Opposition figures accused Chávez of using all the resources of the government to support the Yes campaign, ranging from near-total support for the Yes campaign on state radio and television to placement of Yes campaign ads on official ministry websites. According to opposition figure Leopoldo López, "we aren’t competing against a political party, we're competing against an entire state and all of the power it can wield". The opposition also claimed that No campaign ads had their approval delayed and scheduling manipulated by the National Electoral Council.

On 13 February 2009 the Venezuelan government expelled Luis Herrero, a Spanish member of the European Parliament (and member of the European People's Party), after he called Chávez a dictator and criticized Chávez's handling of the constitutional referendum. One of the parties in the opposition to Chávez had asked Herrero to observe the referendum.

Following claims that US officials had met with Venezuelan opposition leaders in Puerto Rico (which the US denied), Chávez accused U.S. President Barack Obama of meddling in the referendum, adding that "He's said I'm an obstacle for progress in Latin America... Therefore it must be removed, this obstacle, right?" Chávez also added that Obama was under pressure from the Pentagon to be tough on Venezuela by quoting: "He [Obama] knows that if he doesn't obey the orders of the empire, they'll probably kill him."

In April 2009 NACLA reported that its observers had found that "the voting in Venezuela's 2009 referendum was, overall, fair, transparent, and clean."

== Referendum question ==
The question elaborated by the National Electoral Council was:

Do you approve the amendment of articles 160, 162, 174, 192 and 230 of the Constitution of the Republic, as processed by the National Assembly, which increases the political rights of the people, with the purpose of allowing any citizen incumbent in an elected office, to be nominated as candidate for the same office, for the period of time established constitutionally, his or her possible re-election depending exclusively on popular vote?

== Opinion polls ==
Opinion polls conducted on the measure in December 2008 varied widely, with results ranging from 32% approval (with 61% disapproval) to 51% approval (with 39% disapproval).

== Results ==
Choice	Votes	%
For	6,319,636	54.87
Against	5,198,006	45.13
Total	11,517,642	100.00
Valid votes	11,517,642	98.24
Invalid/blank votes	206,582	1.76
Total votes	11,724,224	100.00
Registered voters/turnout	16,652,179	70.41
Source: Direct Democracy, CNE

== Reactions ==
The initial reaction of the opposition to the referendum proposal was that it was illegal. Manuel Rosales, leader of the National Unity opposition coalition, said that it was an insult to call for another election because "the collectivity is overwhelmed by so many problems and also by the high cost of living and inflation" and also because the proposal had already been rejected a year ago. After the official announcement, other opposition parties such as Acción Democrática (AD), Primero Justicia (PJ), Copei, Podemos and MAS, rejected the proposal as well. Leaders of Radical Cause rejected the intention of reelection, considering it unconstitutional, although they also expressed that the best way to defeat it would be through the vote and demonstrations.
