= Interim government of Edgar Sanabria =

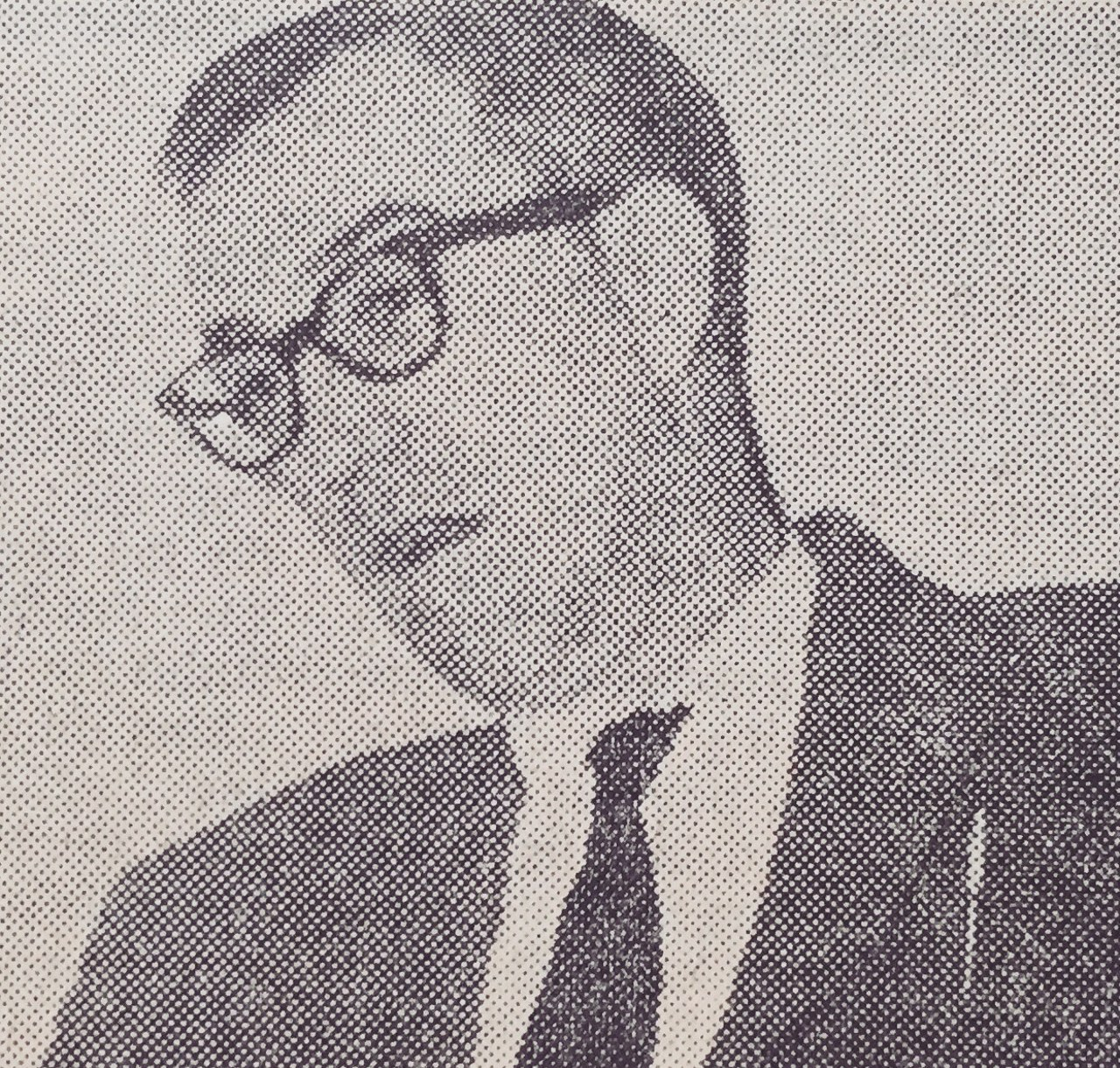
Edgar Sanabria

The interim government of Edgar Sanabria (1958–1959) was the last government of the Government Junta that presided over Venezuela during the transition to democracy, while the 1958 presidential elections were being held. Sanabria took office following the decision of interim president Wolfgang Larrazábal to run as a candidate.

== Background ==
Following the fall of the dictatorship of Marcos Pérez Jiménez, Rear Admiral Wolfgang Larrazábal presided over the Government Junta. When Larrazábal ran for election, Sanabria took over as an independent, having been the last secretary of the Junta.

== Domestic policy ==
=== Economics ===
During Sanabria's government, the Complementary Tax Law was promoted. In December 1958, a law was approved to raise the Venezuelan state's profits from oil extraction from 50% (Fifty‑fifty Law) to 60%. The oil companies reacted by progressively decreasing oil investment in subsequent years.

=== Education ===
During his government, the Universities Law was promoted, which reestablished university autonomy.

== See also ==
- Second presidency of Rómulo Betancourt
