= Dios y Federación =

National motto of Venezuela

Coat of arms of Venezuela in 1871 with the phrase Dios y Federación

Dios y Federación (English: God and Federation) is considered the traditional state motto of Venezuela. It was first used as the rallying cry of the rebel forces during the Federal War, and it was subsequently incorporated into the country's coat of arms after the conflict ended in 1863.

== History ==
According to an account by historian José Gil Fortoul, two French adventurers who had joined the forces of General Ezequiel Zamora near Barinas initially suggested that the customary ...your humble servant valediction in written communications be replaced with Liberté, égalité, fraternité, which was finally modified to Dios y Federación. The phrase subsequently became emblematic of the rebel movement.

After the signing of the Treaty of Coche in April 1863 and the establishment of the new government by the victorious rebels, General Juan Crisóstomo Falcón modified the official seal from 1836, replacing the word Liberty in the central ribbon with Dios y Federación. The phrase would be used in subsequent redesigns of the seal until July 1930, when a decree replaced it with Estados Unidos de Venezuela, in reference to the First Republic of Venezuela.

== Later use ==
Although without legal basis, the phrase has been traditionally considered the country's motto, even after it was officially abandoned. Today, its significance is more political than historical, since for many people in Venezuela it represents the desire to see a return to the decentralized federal system, away from the centralist and authoritarian regimes of recent years.

The motto is still featured in the coat of arms of the state of Barinas. It was part of the state flag of Falcón until 2006, and it is still used in official documents by the Judicial branch of Venezuela. Dios y Federación was also used occasionally in official communications by the government of Alta California in the 1820s.

== See also ==
- History of Venezuela

== Bibliography ==
- Carrera Damas, Germán (2006). Mitos Políticos en Las Sociedades Andinas: Orígenes, Invenciones y Ficciones. Volume 216 of Travaux de l'I.F.E.A (in Spanish). Equinoccio. ISBN 9789802372416.
- Gallegos, Rómulo (1996). Charles Minguet (ed.). Canaima. Volume 20 of Colección Archivos (in Spanish). Editorial Universidad de Costa Rica. ISBN 9788489666191.
- Hittell, T.H. (1898). History of California. Vol. 2. N.J. Stone. LCCN rc01000721.
