= Pedro Gual Escandón =

Venezuelan lawyer, politician, journalist and diplomat

Pedro Gual
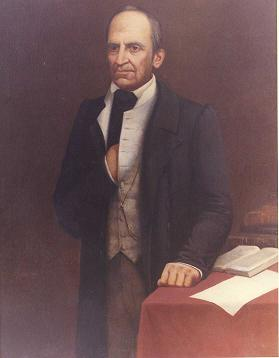

President of Venezuela
- Interim
- In office 15 March 1858 – 18 March 1858
- Preceded by: José Tadeo Monagas
- Succeeded by: Julián Castro
- In office 2 August 1859 – 29 September 1859
- Preceded by: Julián Castro
- Succeeded by: Manuel Felipe de Tovar
- In office 20 May 1861 – 29 August 1861
- Preceded by: Manuel Felipe de Tovar
- Succeeded by: José Antonio Páez

1st Secretary of Foreign Affairs of Colombia
- In office 7 October 1821 – 17 September 1825
- President: Simón Bolívar
- Preceded by: *Office created
- Succeeded by: José Rafael Revenga y Hernández

Personal details
- Born: 17 January 1783 Santiago de León de Caracas, Province of Caracas, Captaincy General of Venezuela, Viceroyalty of New Granada, Spanish Empire
- Died: 6 May 1862 (aged 79) Guayaquil, Ecuador
- Party: Conservative Party
- Spouse: Rosa María Domínguez

Pedro José Ramón Gual Escandón (17 January 1783 – 6 May 1862), was a Venezuelan lawyer, politician, journalist and diplomat who was President of Venezuela for three short periods in 1858, 1859 and 1861. In 1861, he was ousted from power in a military coup.

During the Venezuelan War of Independence he came to the United States to buy weapons for the Patriots. In 1815 he came to stay in the home of Manuel Torres. With Torres and other agents he helped organize General Francisco Xavier Mina's ill-fated expedition to Mexico, with Gual acting as Mina's press agent. Gual was one of the men who signed Gregor MacGregor's commission to invade Spanish Florida through Amelia Island in 1817, which offended President James Monroe's administration; thereafter he left the U.S.

In 1824 as chancellor of Great Colombia he negotiated with the U.S. diplomat Richard Clough Anderson Jr. and concluded the Anderson–Gual Treaty, the first bilateral treaty that the U.S. signed with another American state. He was the president of Venezuela for three periods (1858, 1859, and 1861) and a member of the Conservative Centralist party.

== See also ==
- Anderson–Gual Treaty
- Federal War
- Presidents of Venezuela

Political offices
Preceded by José Tadeo Monagas	President of Venezuela; 1858	Succeeded by Julián Castro
Preceded by Julián Castro	President of Venezuela; 1859	Succeeded by Manuel Felipe de Tovar
Preceded by Manuel Felipe de Tovar	President of Venezuela; 1861	Succeeded by José Antonio Páez
