= Conservative Party (Venezuela) =

Conservative Party Partido Conservador
- Leader(s): José Antonio Páez; José María Vargas; Andrés Narvarte; Carlos Soublette
- Founded: August 24, 1830
- Dissolved: 1899
- Ideology: Conservatism; Centralization; Manchesterism (except Toro faction); Economic liberalism (except Toro faction); Liberal legalism
- Political position: Centre-right to right-wing
- Colours: Crimson

Party flag

The Conservative Party (Spanish: Partido Conservador, PC) was a political party in Venezuela, founded in 1830. It was the rival of the Liberal Party.

== History ==
The party very successfully promoted conservative policies during the early days of the Republic. Several of the early presidents of the country were members of the Conservative Party.

== List of presidents ==
№	Portrait	President (Birth–Death)	State	Term of office	Term
1		José Antonio Páez (1790–1873)	Portuguesa	13 January 1830 –20 January 1835	1 (1831–35)
2		Andrés Narvarte (1781–1853)	Vargas	20 January 1835 –9 February 1835	1 (1831–35)
3		José María Vargas (1786–1854)	Vargas	9 February 1835 –9 July 1835	2 (1835–39)
4		José María Carreño (1792–1849)	Miranda	27 July 1835 –20 August 1835	2 (1835–39)
(3)		José María Vargas (1786–1854)	Vargas	20 August 1835 –24 April 1836	2 (1835–39)
(2)		Andrés Narvarte (1781–1853)	Vargas	24 April 1836 –20 January 1837	2 (1835–39)
(4)		José María Carreño (1792–1849)	Miranda	27 January 1837 –11 March 1837	2 (1835–39)
5		Carlos Soublette (1789–1870)	Vargas	11 March 1837 –1 February 1839	2 (1835–39)
(1)		José Antonio Páez (1790–1873)	Portuguesa	1 February 1839 –28 January 1843	3 (1839–43)
(5)		Carlos Soublette (1789–1870)	Vargas	28 January 1843 –20 January 1847	4 (1843–47)
6		José Tadeo Monagas (1784–1868)	Monagas	20 January 1847 –5 February 1851	5 (1847–51)

== See also ==
- Federal War
- Dios y Federación
- Liberalism and conservatism in Latin America
