= Legalist Revolution =

Revolution in Venezuela

- Part of the Venezuelan civil wars
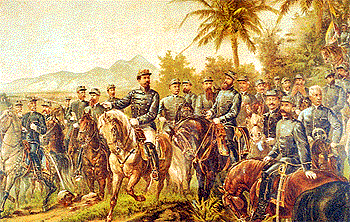
- General Joaquín Crespo and the leaders of the Legalist Revolution painting
Date	11 March-6 October 1892
Location	Center of Venezuela
Result	Rebel victory

Belligerents
Legalist Rebels	Continuist Government

Commanders and leaders
Joaquín Crespo	Raimundo Andueza Palacio

Strength
9.000-12.000	5,000 at the beginning

Casualties and losses
- 10.000 deaths y 6000 wounded in total.

The Legalist Revolution was a civil war in Venezuela that was caused by the "Continuity movement" of President Raimundo Andueza Palacios who wanted to perpetuate himself in power through a constitutional reform. Although it was constitutionally stipulated that his term would end on 20 February 1892, Andueza planned to reform the Constitution in order to prolong his stay in power for two more years, which is why he was called a Continuationist.

Joaquín Crespo took up arms on March 11 in his power base of "El Totumo", in Guárico state, starting the war that spread to the rest of the country. The government appointed General Sebastián Casañas, commander of the army, to fight the Revolution while Generals Ramón Guerra, Wenceslao Casado and José Manuel Hernández, known as "El Mocho Hernández", joined the Legalist movement of Joaquin Crespo.

== Battle of Jobo Mocho and international naval squadron ==
On 15 April 1892, Joaquin Crespo defeated the Minister of War Sebastián Casañas in the Battle of Jobo Mocho and made him retreat to Calabozo. The unrest threatened foreigners business in the country which were a cause for concern for diplomatic missions in Caracas. On May, General Cipriano Castro as presidente of Táchira state organized an army to confront the Legalist Revolution and launched a military campaign that began with the defeat of 2,000 men under the command of Espíritu Santo Morales and Eliseo Araujo. After successful battles in Palmira and San Juan de Lagunillas, he entered Mérida intending to march on Caracas, but Joaquín Crespo's advance against the Andueza troops, indicative of a massive victory for the revolution, forced him to abandon the campaign. During the unrest in Venezuela, locals had attacked European nationals who demanded coercity actions from its diplomats in Caracas. The Kaiserliche Marine sent the German cruise SMS SMS Arcona from Wilhelmshaven on 4 May wuch arrived in La Guaira, on 9 June.Days after she was joined by the French cruise Magon as part of an international squadron that included other warships to ensure the situation did not escalate in Venezuela. Guillermo Tell Villegas, was appointed interim President of Venezuela on 17 June 1892, while elected president Venezuelan president Andueza Palacio was in absentia dealing with the outbreak of the Legalist Revolution. The general Luciano Mendoza was appointed by President Villegas as chief of the governmental army and was able to defeat Joaquín Crespo at La Cortada del Guayabo on July 1. However, before the advances of the revolutionaries, general Mendoza must retreat to Caracas where he establishes a Military Triumvirate along with the general Julio Sarria (at that time Minister of War and Navy) and Domingo Monagas that attempted to confront, from Caracas, the forces of Crespo, and the establishment of a military dictatorship de fact. Manuel González Gil, a young man appointed by Crespo to protect his farms in Caura region received 700 men destined to introduce the Legalist revolution on Bolivar State. However, Gil was not welcome in the Roscio Division by order of Generals José Manuel Hernández and Domingo Sifontes the chiefs of revolution in the Yuruary Federal Territory. His only option was to return to Caura region and wait for the revolution triumph, which it did after the defeat of General Santo Carrera and the State President, Juan Teófilo Siegert Jr. in Orocopiche island. The General Hernández assumed civil and military command of the state on August 13, 1892. Crespo take the stronghold of Puerto Cabello on 24 August 1892. Following the resignation of his uncle, on 31 August 1892, Guillermo Tell Villegas Pulido was selected by the Federal Council as the provisional president of Venezuela. On 1 September 1892 the Dutch cruiser De Ruyter docked at Curazao set sail to La Guaira, to support the naval blockade established by French cruiser Magon, the German warship SMS Arcona and the Spanish sloop Jorge Juan were already present. All commanders then came on board De Ruyter to coordinate their actions. The SMS Arcona proceeded to Macuto, where attacks on German nationals had occurred, and the ship's presence was sufficient to secure an apology from the Venezuelan government. On 5 September the British corvette HMS Canada arrived to La Guaira, and two days after the corvette HMS Pylades. On 10 September the American gunboats USS Chicago and USS Concord arrived. On the 16th the USS Kearsarge arrived with aboard the Admiral John Grimes Walker, commandant of the North Atlántic Squadron.

== Battle of Los Colorados and the Battle of Boquerón ==
In autumn Joaquín Crespo advanced towards Caracas at the head of more than 10,000 men, and encountered the Continuationist army of Generals José Ignacio Pulido and Luciano Mendoza at Los Teques.

The Battle of Los Colorados and the Battle of Boquerón took place between 3 and 5 October 1892, and was a defeat for the Continuationists.
Luciano Mendoza, José Ignacio Pulido and president Guillermo Tell Villegas Pulido withdrew and abandoned Caracas on 6 October. The city was left unprotected, and gangs of looters invaded the residences of Raimundo Andueza Palacio, Pulido, Sarria and other leaders of the defeated government, as well as the offices of the newspaper La Opinión Nacional. A few hours later, Crespo entered the capital, marking the triumph of the Legalist Revolution.

== Aftermaths ==
Joaquin Crespo immediately took charge of the national executive power and would remain President of Venezuela until 1898. The ex president Andueza Palacio into exile in France, not returning until after Crespo's death in 1898.The whole affair ended quietly, with warships of international squadron lift the blockade on the October,16. On 21 June 1893, a new Constitution was signed that would stipulate in its article 63, direct and secret voting, and a Presidential period of maximum 4 years in its article 71. Cipriano Castro and Juan Vicente Gomez went into exile in Colombia when the government of Andueza Palacios was overthrown on June 17, 1892. Castro lived in Colombia for seven years, amassing a fortune in illegal cattle trading and recruiting a private army. Castro used it to march on Caracas in October 1899 called the Restorative Liberal Revolution, and seize power of Presudent Ignacio Andrade, installing himself as the supreme military commander.

== Sources ==
- Hildebrand, Hans H.; Röhr, Albert & Steinmetz, Hans-Otto (1993). Die Deutschen Kriegsschiffe: Biographien – ein Spiegel der Marinegeschichte von 1815 bis zur Gegenwart [The German Warships: Biographies − A Reflection of Naval History from 1815 to the Present] (in German). Vol. 1. Ratingen: Mundus Verlag. ISBN 978-3-7822-0496-5.
