= José Tadeo Monagas =

President of Venezuela from 1847-51 and 1855-58

José Tadeo Monagas Burgos
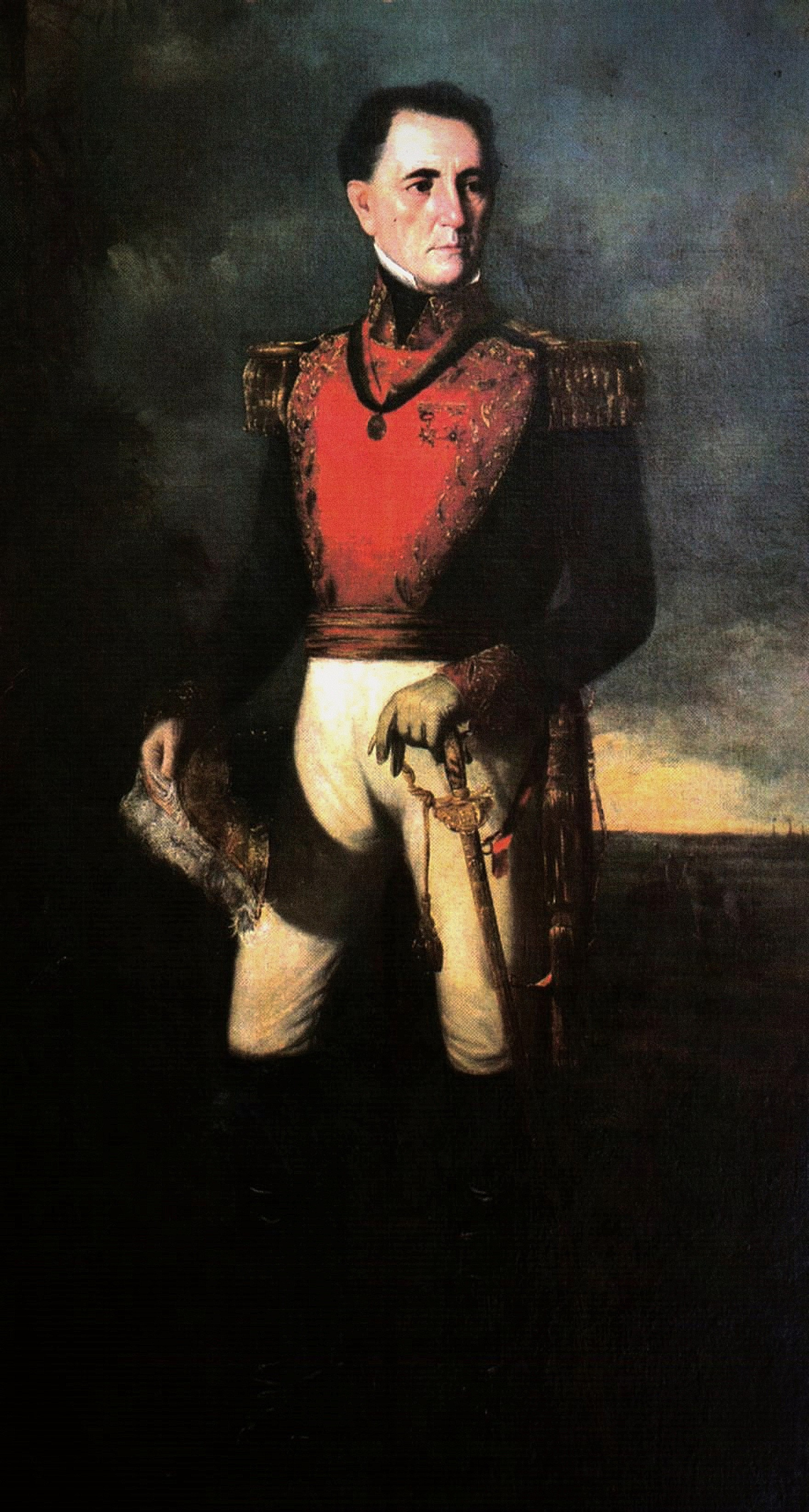
- Portrait by Martín Tovar y Tovar

President of Venezuela
- In office 1 March 1847 – 5 February 1851
- Preceded by: Carlos Soublette
- Succeeded by: José Gregorio Monagas
- In office 20 January 1855 – 15 March 1858
- Preceded by: José Gregorio Monagas
- Succeeded by: Pedro Gual Escandon

Personal details
- Born: 28 October 1784 Maturín, Monagas
- Died: 18 November 1868 (aged 84) Caracas
- Citizenship: Spanish (1784–1810); Venezuelan (1817–1819); Colombian (1819–1830); Venezuelan (1830–1868)
- Party: Conservative Party; Liberal Party
- Spouse: Luisa Oriach Ladrón de Guevara

José Tadeo Monagas Burgos (28 October 1784 – 18 November 1868) was the president of Venezuela from 1847 to 1851 and again from 1855 to 1858. He was a hero of the Venezuelan War of Independence.

== Career ==
=== Monagato ===
In 1846, to head off the challenge from the Liberal Party, ex-President and caudillo José Antonio Páez selected Monagas as Conservative candidate. Páez thought Monagas could be controlled but he gravitated toward the Liberals, and eventually dispersed the Congress. In 1848 Páez led a rebellion against Monagas but was defeated by General Santiago Mariño in the 'Battle of the Araguatos', imprisoned, and eventually exiled.

As a member of the Liberal Party, he abolished capital punishment for political crimes. The Liberal Party also passed laws that abolished slavery, extended suffrage, and limited interest rates. José Tadeo Monagas also supported his brother José Gregorio for the presidency.

José Tadeo Monagas and his brother José Gregorio Monagas combined rule 1847–1858 is commonly referred to as the Monagas Dynasty or "Monagato".

=== Gobierno de los Azules ===
During José Tadeo's second term, the Monagas brothers attempted to end term limits and extend presidential terms to six-years, which instead ended with the overthrow of José Tadeo at the hands of Julián Castro and his Liberal and Conservative allies.

== Personal life ==
Monagas was married to Luisa Oriach Ladrón de Guevara, who served as First Lady of Venezuela from 1847 until 1851. She was then First Lady again from 1855 until 1858.

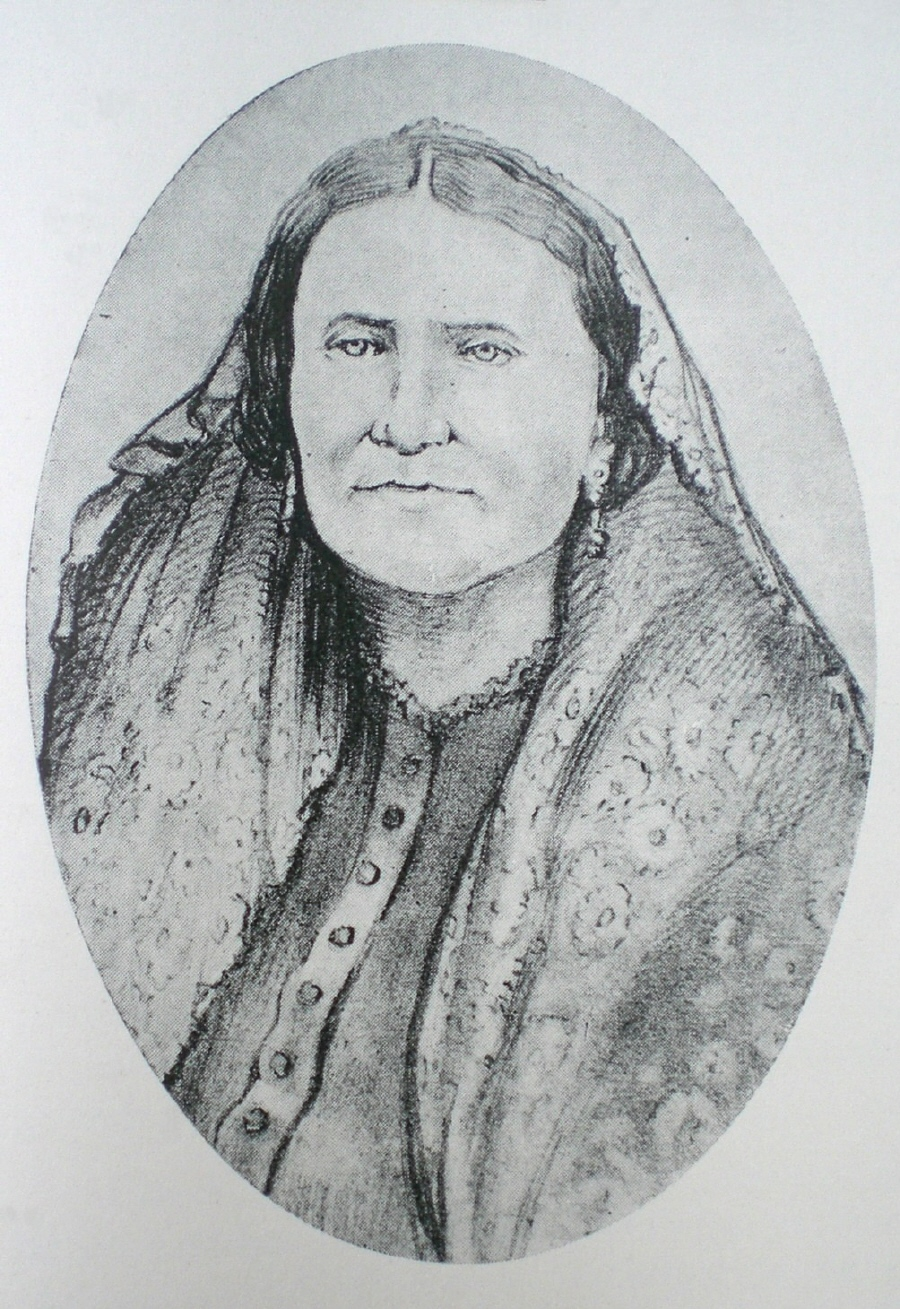
Luisa Oriach Ladrón de Guevara

== See also ==
- Monagato
- Gobierno de los Azules

Political offices
Preceded by Carlos Soublette	11th President of Venezuela; 1 March 1847 – 5 February 1851	Succeeded by José Gregorio Monagas
Preceded by José Gregorio Monagas	13th President of Venezuela; 20 January 1855 – 15 March 1858	Succeeded by Pedro Gual Escandon
