= Great Liberal Party of Venezuela =

Liberal Party Partido Liberal
- Founder: Antonio Leocadio Guzmán
- Founded: August 20, 1840
- Dissolved: 1899
- Headquarters: Caracas, Venezuela
- Newspaper: El Venezolano
- Ideology: Liberalism; Federalism; Factions: Economic liberalism (Tomás Lander faction); Guzmánism (Antonio Guzmán Blanco faction); Zamoraism (Ezequiel Zamora faction); Utopian socialism (Ezequiel Zamora faction); Mutualism (Ezequiel Zamora faction)
- Political position: Centre; Faction: Left-wing
- Colours: Amber
- Slogan: Dios y Federación

Party flag

The Liberal Party (Spanish: Partido Liberal, PL), better known as Great Liberal Party of Venezuela (Spanish: Gran Partido Liberal de Venezuela, GPLV), was a political party in Venezuela, founded on August 20, 1840, by Antonio Leocadio Guzmán and Tomás Lander, through an editorial published by Guzmán at El Venezolano newspaper. It was the rival of the Conservative Party.

== History ==
The party very successfully promoted liberal policies during the early days of the Republic. Several of the early presidents of the country were members of the Liberal Party, including José Tadeo Monagas (in office from 1 March 1847 – 5 February 1851 and 20 January 1855 – 15 March 1858) who abolished capital punishment for political crimes. President José Gregorio Monagas proclaimed that Venezuela was a nation free of slavery in an edict signed on 24 March 1854. In 1863, under the leadership of President Juan Crisóstomo Falcón (in office 15 June 1863 – 25 April 1868), a member of the Liberal Party, Venezuela became the first country to totally abolish the death penalty for all crimes.

== Presidents of Venezuela ==
=== State of Venezuela (1830–1864) ===
No.	Portrait	President (Birth–Death)	State	Term of office
7		José Gregorio Monagas (1795–1858)	Monagas	5 February 1851 – 20 January 1855
(6)		José Tadeo Monagas (1784–1868)	Monagas	20 January 1855 – 15 March 1858

=== United States of Venezuela (1864–1953) ===
No.	Portrait	President (Birth–Death)	State	Term of office
		Juan Crisóstomo Falcón (1820–1870)	Falcón	10 June 1863 – 25 April 1868
13		Guillermo Tell Villegas (1823–1907)	Carabobo	28 June 1868 – 20 February 1869
(13)		Guillermo Tell Villegas (1823–1907)	Carabobo	16 April 1870 – 27 April 1870
15		Antonio Guzmán Blanco (1829–1899)	Caracas	27 April 1870 – 27 February 1877
16		Francisco Linares Alcántara (1825–1878)	Aragua	27 February 1877 – 30 November 1878
17		José Gregorio Valera (1826–1896)		30 November 1878 – 26 February 1879
(15)		Antonio Guzmán Blanco (1829–1899)	Caracas	26 February 1879 – 26 April 1884
18		Joaquín Crespo (1830–1898)	Aragua	26 April 1884 – 15 September 1886
(15)		Antonio Guzmán Blanco (1829–1899)	Caracas	15 September 1886 – 8 August 1887
20		Juan Pablo Rojas Paúl (1826–1905)	Caracas	2 July 1888 – 19 March 1890
		Raimundo Andueza Palacio (1846–1900)	Portuguesa	
(13)		Guillermo Tell Villegas (1823–1907)	Carabobo	17 June 1892 – 31 August 1892
22		Guillermo Tell Villegas Pulido (1854–1949)	Barinas	31 August 1892 – 7 October 1892
		Joaquín Crespo (1830–1898)	Aragua	
23		Ignacio Andrade (1839–1925)	Mérida	28 February 1898 – 20 October 1899

== See also ==
- Federal War
- Dios y Federación
- Liberalism and conservatism in Latin America
