= Pedro Carujo =

Venezuelan journalist and military member

- Born: 1801; Barcelona, Anzoátegui State
- Died: 31 January 1836 (aged 34–35) Valencia, Carabobo State
- Allegiance: Gran Colombia; Venezuela
- Service years: 1819–1836
- Rank: General
- Conflicts: Venezuelan War of Independence; Revolution of the Reforms

Pedro Carujo (1801–1836) was a Venezuelan military officer. He was one of the leaders in the Revolution of the Reforms of 1835.

== Youth ==
He was the son of Canarian José Carujo, royalist official and Venezuelan Juana Hernandez. He received a good education, being one of the few Venezuelans of his time who spoke and wrote English and French. Although born in a home divided over the Royalist and Republican causes, he joined the liberation movement as part of the battalion Orinoco quartered in Angostura (1819). In 1821, he participated under the command of General José Francisco Bermúdez, in the campaigns of Caracas and St. Lucia. With the rank of captain, he distinguished himself in Maracaibo (1823), but was wounded in combat, so he moved to New Granada with the rank of sergeant.

== In New Granada ==
He studied mathematics and analytical geometry under the leadership of the Franciscan friar Tomás Sánchez Mora, and joined the Freemasons. In 1828, while serving as a General Staff assistant of the department of Cundinamarca, he was promoted to commander and was selected by Simon Bolivar to chair the Military Academy that was founded in Bogotá. In spite of this, he joined the opponents of President Simón Bolívar, who perpetrated the attacks of 25 September 1828 against the Liberator's life.

He was sentenced to death but was saved thanks to a pardon granted by the Council of Ministers, with intervention from Rafael Urdaneta. He was locked in a prison in Bogota, and was then imprisoned in the Boca Chica Castle, Cartagena. In March 1829, he was transferred to Solano castle overlooking Puerto Cabello from which he escaped. However, he was captured soon after and was returned to the fort in a humiliating way.

His time spent in prison advocating for freedom, writing to the general José Antonio Páez and other officials of the regime; to publishing articles and letters in El Fanal newspaper. He was deported to Curaçao in early June 1830, and the general amnesty decreed by Paez in the same month allowed him to return to Venezuela. He went to Maracaibo and organized a militia of 1,000 men, with whom he crossed the border and ventured to Riohacha, who had rebelled against the government of Rafael Urdaneta. In January 1831, in the vicinity of San José and the Mill, he was defeated by the general Jose Felix Blanco, after which he would retire from the army in 1833. Subsequently, he became the spokesman for a group of military and ranchers gathered around the general Santiago Mariño. Carujo fought from the columns of the El republicano newspaper against the presidential candidacy of José María Vargas, whom he accused of being "realistic and unpatriotic" (1834).

== Revolution and death ==
In 1835, he was one of the officers who led the Revolution of the Reforms, led by General Santiago Mariño, and was in charge of capturing President Vargas at home. There was a dialogue between them, whereby Carujo told Vargas: "Doctor Vargas, the world belongs to the brave", who in turn replied: "the world is for the just man", after which he went into exile on the island of Saint Thomas.

In charge in the Anzoátegui battalion, Carujo was one of the most militant participants in that civil war, winning the battles of Cariaco and Carúpano, where he defeated the general Francisco Esteban Gomez. The army left Puerto Cabello, won in El Pino, near San Esteban National Park, against the colonel Andrés Torellas and three of their brigades. They attempted to take Valencia on 28 October and were defeated the next day in the battle of Camoruco, by general José María Carreño. Although he was locked in the San Felipe Castle, Carujo managed to escape and restart incursions into Tucacas, Aroa and San Felipe. Finally, wounded and captured at the Battle of Paso Real, near Puerto Cabello, he was tried and sentenced to death, but the sentence was not fulfilled, and he died in prison in Valencia, as a result of injuries sustained in battle.
