= First presidency of José Antonio Páez =

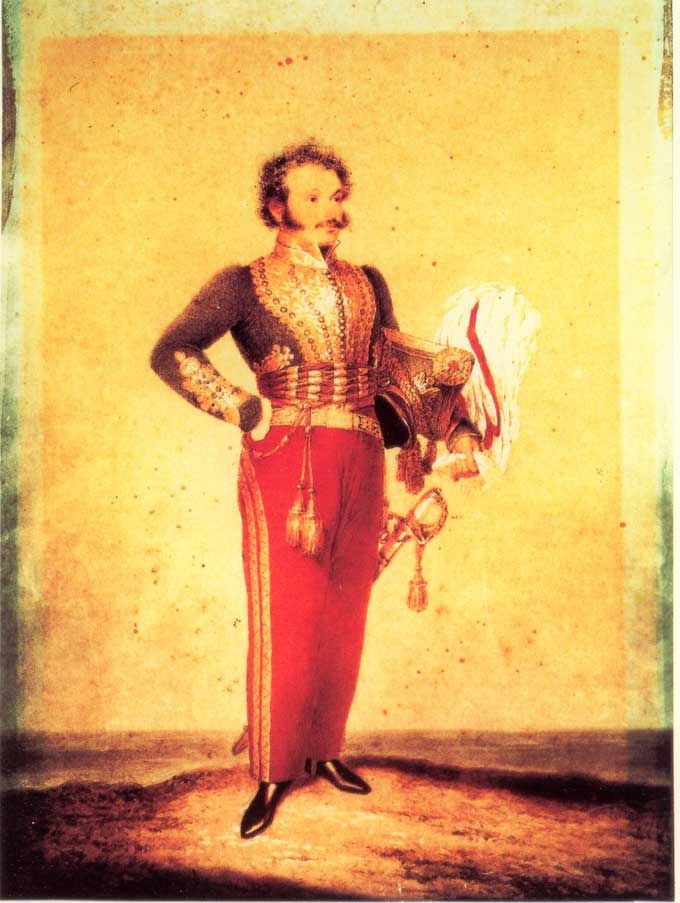
Páez in 1828.

The first presidency of José Antonio Páez (1831–1835) marked Venezuela's inaugural administration as an independent nation following its separation from Gran Colombia through the separatist movement known as La Cosiata, which occurred in the aftermath of the War of Independence.

The Páez administration established the judicial and legislative framework of the newly created republic and enacted the 1830 Constitution. In foreign policy, Páez negotiated the Michelena-Pombo Treaty with New Granada (modern-day Colombia).

After losing the subsequent election to José María Vargas, following the failed candidacy of his preferred successor, Carlos Soublette, Páez peacefully transferred power, though he would remain a dominant political figure for over two decades.

== Background ==
José Antonio Páez, a political opponent of Simón Bolívar and advocate for ending Gran Colombia, rose to power with the backing of the Conservative Oligarchy. In September 1830, the Congress of Valencia formally declared Venezuela's separation from Colombia. Páez won the 1831 presidential election with 136 votes (86.07% of the total).

== Inauguration ==
On 11 April 1831, José Antonio Páez was sworn in as constitutional President of Venezuela. In his inaugural address, he declared:

"The truth is that one of the finest periods in our history is now beginning, particularly in terms of the political and moral organization of the Republic. Prudence, firmness, integrity, a shrewd understanding of the impossibility of immediately breaking away from military leadership, yet coupled with a resolute determination to restrain it; a diligent and consistent enthusiasm for establishing an effective public administration and balancing liberty with order, these were the virtues of that generation, which succeeded in transforming the dissolution of Colombia, begun under such grim circumstances, into a patriotic and legalist movement..."

== Domestic policy ==
=== Legislative policy ===
The 1830 Constitution was ratified, establishing the legal foundation of the republic.

=== Defense ===
Despite budget and personnel cuts to the military, efforts were made to professionalize the armed forces and standardize recruitment procedures. The 1830 Constitution granted the legislative branch authority to determine enlistment methods and the size of both the standing army and militia.

The Constituent Congress of Valencia (1830) organized the armed forces into three branches: Permanent Army, National Militia and Navy. The National Militia Law mandated compulsory service for all Venezuelan men aged 18 to 40, with exemptions only for public officials and clergy. Provincial governors were responsible for maintaining militia rosters.

=== Economy ===
Páez promoted agriculture and industry. Key measures included: Abolition of the alcabala tax (8 June 1831), which had hindered urban trade, Anti-monopoly decree (22 March 1833) ending state control over tobacco production (in place since 1779) and Law of Freedom of Contracts (10 April 1834), instituting laissez-faire principles by allowing unrestricted interest rates on loans.

=== Cultural policy ===
In 1834, the National Library of Venezuela was established.

== See also ==
- Second presidency of José Antonio Páez
- Dictatorship of José Antonio Páez
- Presidency of José María Vargas
