= La Cosiata =

Separatist movement in Venezuela

- Part of Dissolution of Gran Colombia
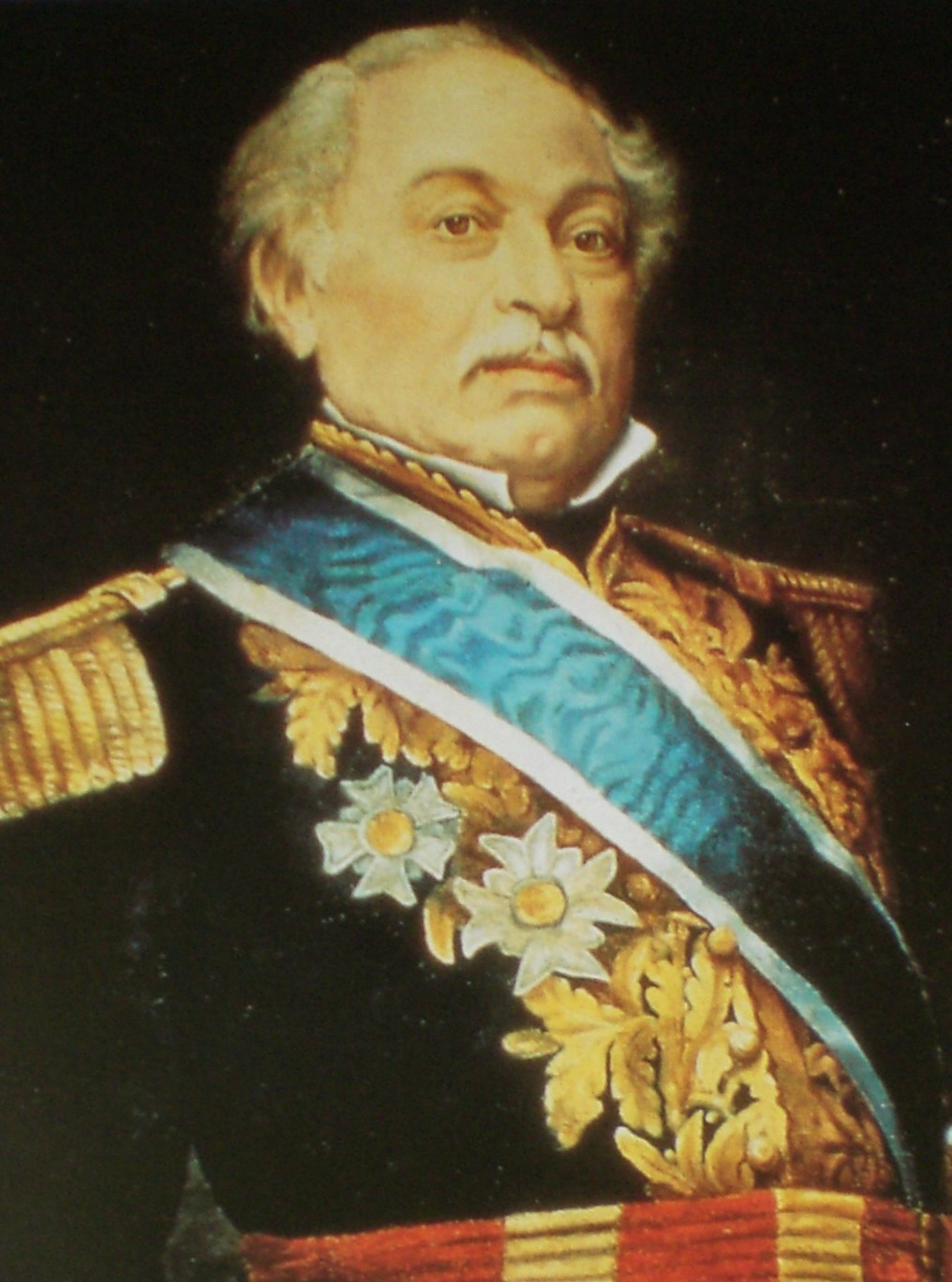
- José Antonio Páez, principal figure in La Cosiata.
- Date: 30 April 1826
- Location: Venezuela (initially part of Gran Colombia)
- Caused by: Absolutist government under Cúcuta Constitution
- Goals: Initially constitutional reform, later secession while maintaining protection from Simón Bolívar

La Cosiata, also known as the Revolution of the Morrocoyes, was a political separatist movement that broke out in the city of Valencia, Venezuela, and carried out by General José Antonio Páez and Miguel Peña Páez on April 30, 1826. They were fighting for Venezuelan secession from Gran Colombia.

Initially, the movement fought for the reform of the Cúcuta Constitution and a break with the authorities of Santa Fe de Bogotá while maintaining the protection of Simón Bolívar. Some conclude that these events had been foreshadowed since the birth of the Republic of Gran Colombia, since a centralized system was adopted in the hands of the political and economic elites when it was founded. Under the Cúcuta Constitution, the government had become absolutist, and Venezuelan authorities were subject to the decisions of the centralized Senate of Gran Colombia (New Granada, Venezuela and Ecuador); in Peru and Bolivia there was news about a new (but unpopular) lasting constitution. Several regions, including Venezuela, sought autonomy, leading to years of struggle for independence.

== Etymology ==
According to research carried out by historian, Professor José M. Ameliach N., which he reflected upon in his article "La Cosiata fue el principio del fin", in the newspaper El Informador de Barquisimeto, dated January 22, 2012, the movement's etymological meaning stems from the custom in Venezuela of giving name to political events. There was a contemporary Italian comedian who had arrived in the country and tended to use the word "Cosiata" in his routines to refer to theatrical events without importance or meaning. Since this word had become trendy, the news media began to use it in reference to this movement.

== Background ==
By 1821, the Cúcuta Constitution (Constitution of Gran Colombia) had been causing discomfort among Venezuelans from the beginning, only being enacted in Caracas under protest from the Municipality. The election of Francisco de Paula Santander for the Vice Presidency of the Republic, the choice of a centralist system instead of a federal one, and the election of Bogotá as the capital of the newly formed Union, were also points of great discord throughout the populace, which felt that the decisions being made were not benefiting Venezuela. The central constitution, which could not be reformed for ten years, provided for certain federal measures over time, but relied on the people abiding by the Magna Carta and the law.

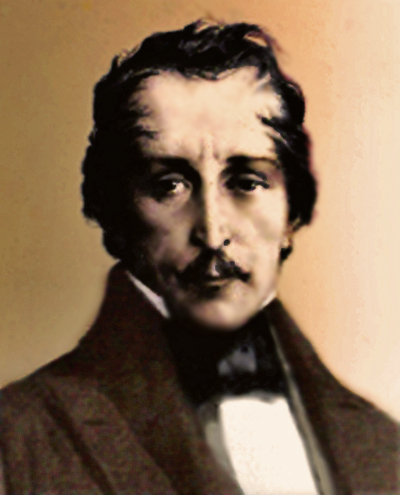
General Francisco de Paula Santander. Sketch by Helen Bedout, 1819.

On 31 August 1824, Francisco de Paula Santander decreed that there would be a general enlistment of all citizens between the ages of 16 and 50 in the country and demanded a contingent of 50,000 men from the Department of Venezuela to be sent to Bogotá. This was motivated by the constant onslaught of royalist guerrillas, Venezuela's ongoing recovering from the emancipatory war, and fears of a joint army of France and Spain. At the time, there was a prevalent belief that France and Spain would enter an alleged "Holy Alliance" and form a powerful army.

To his credit, General José Antonio Páez, who had been exercising the functions of General Commander of the Department of Venezuela (Caracas, Carabobo, Barquisimeto, Barinas and Apure) since 1822, delayed the execution of that decree for almost a year, fearful not only of a general mutiny, but also to show their displeasure at the government's decisions. Subsequently, and due to the continuous pressure from Bogotá, he decided to accept the call for enlistment of the Venezuelans, which finally ended in resounding failure due to the recruitment of only 800 citizens, so they were forced to make a second and third call in collaboration with the Brigadier General Juan Escalona (Intendant of the Department of Venezuela) ending these new attempts in bloody disturbances. Reports of excesses in recruitment reached the Municipal Council of Caracas, which led to an accusation that would prosper in the Senate of Bogotá.

The part of the facts did not take long for the news to reach the Gran-Colombian capital, immediately sending the corresponding documentation to present the report on the situation. Vice President Santander took advantage of the situation to request that Congress proceed with great prudence in the face of a political crisis that was affecting the relationship between Caracas and Bogotá, resorting to reminding the deputies of the brilliant career of General Páez and the need to count on his person if it was possible for the good of the Union. Páez is finally removed from his position as General Commander of the Department of Venezuela, being immediately called to Bogotá to face trial, by vote of the Senate.

This is how Páez hands over command to General Juan de Escalona, but Páez was advised, by Miguel Peña among others, who believed that his presence before the government of Santafé (Bogotá) would be the scaffold, Miguel Peña named facts of what occurred with Colonel Leonardo Infante, a Venezuelan officer who had been sentenced to be shot in March 1825, accused of the murder of Lieutenant Perdomo, but Miguel Peña, by refusing to sign the final sentence, had been suspended from his duties for one year. from March 24, 1825. Páez refuses to obey the order to move to Bogotá, finally residing in his house in the City of Valencia. Three months later a revolt of citizens arises in front of the Municipal Council of the locality, the next day the mayors declare that before the alteration of the public order that was taking place in the province, it was necessary to bring Páez back to the leadership of the country. Faced with such a situation, José Antonio Páez declares himself in rebellion.

Bolívar, who had been re-elected President and upon learning of this situation, left Lima for Venezuela on September 4, 1826, arriving in Guayaquil on September 12 and Bogotá on November 16, then headed for Cartagena and from there by sea, arriving at Puerto Cabello on December 31, by January 19, 1827, in the same city, Bolívar had decreed a cloak of oblivion over the performances of the participants of "La Cosiata". Bolívar met with Páez, reaffirming his liberating union and the Liberator granted him a general amnesty and ratified José Antonio Páez Herrera as Civil and Military Chief of the Department of Venezuela. However, the divisions between Venezuelan and New Granadan leaders increased in view of the delay in the constitutional reforms requested by the citizens, intensifying in subsequent years.

Bolívar returned to Santafé at the beginning of 1827, encountering strong resistance in the political circles that were grouped around General Santander. The trust that the Liberator placed in his closest military collaborators, mostly Venezuelans and British, and their frequent excesses, added one more reason to the differences between Bolívar and the members of Congress.

== Foundation of the Republic of Venezuela ==
On April 2, 1828, due to the movement initiated by General José Antonio Páez and others who also sought the revision of the Constitution of Gran Colombia, what is known as the Ocaña Convention was held with the aim of electing the Congress constituent that would modify the Constitution of Cúcuta. Those attending the convention were deputies from the Departments of Colombia, Ecuador, Panama and Venezuela, these in turn were formed into two factions, the Centralists led by Simón Bolívar and the Federalists led by Francisco de Paula Santander on the Colombian side and José Antonio Páez on the Venezuelan side, with the latter group having more followers.

Bolívar, with his fervent desire to see Gran Colombia united in the face of internal and external aggression, decides to impose his will, thus establishing a dictatorship as a last resort. In August 1828, he presented a new Constitution with a marked centralist accent and for the first time a presidential system for life in which he could have the power to appoint his successor. This was the final spark that ignited the spirits of those seeking secession, seeing that proposal as a return to the monarchical system that they had gotten rid of in the War of Independence against Spain; For this reason, multiple attempts to assassinate the Liberator arise.

On December 27, 1829, an assembly gathered in the Convent of San Francisco in Caracas disregarded the authority of Bolívar and the Colombian Government, handing over power to Páez who in an official letter let Bolívar know, which was read in a convention meeting in Bogotá for January 1830 where he urges him to accept the separation of Venezuela. This convention called the Admirable Congress was convened by the Liberator himself with the intention of reconciling the factions that had been created in the Republic and thus avoid the dissolution of Gran Colombia, so upon receiving the news from Venezuela, he requested dictatorial powers from Congress. to meet with Páez in Mérida (Venezuela) and remedy the crisis, but such permission was denied, for which Simón Bolívar finally resigned his position in that same month of January 1830.

Páez then decides to form a Provisional Government by becoming Head of the Administration and issues a decree where he calls for the election of deputies for a Constituent Congress that would meet in the city of Valencia on May 6, 1830, which culminated in the creation of the Republic of Venezuela and the establishment of Valencia as the provisional capital.

The Constitution that was to govern the new Republic of Venezuela was sanctioned on September 22, 1830, entering into force that same month.

On March 24, 1831, the legal vote was taken to elect the President of the Republic, resulting in General José Antonio Páez Herrera being elected for the first constitutional period of four years as President of the Republic, who obtained 136 votes (86.07%) of the 158 voters who voted. The next day, voting was held to elect the first Vice President of the Republic, and since none of the candidates obtained a legal majority, the election was perfected and Mr. Diego Bautista Urbaneja was appointed for two years.

On April 11, 1831, General José Antonio Páez took the legal oath as Constitutional President of Venezuela; an excerpt from his speech that day upon taking office:

The truth is that one of the best periods in our history opens then, and precisely in relation to the political and moral organization of the Republic. Prudence, firmness, probity, sagacious appreciation of the impossibility of separating from the military chief at that time, but at the same time courageous intention to watch over him and reduce him; laborious and consistent enthusiasm to work for an effective public administration and to balance freedom and order, such were the virtues of that generation, which managed to convert the dismemberment of Colombia into a patriotic and legalistic movement, initiated under such disastrous auspices...

President Páez ruled with relative peace during his term, his government being made up mostly of high-ranking military veterans of the War of Independence, achieving a slight recovery of the economy devastated by the war, mainly due to the enactment of the Law of Freedom of Contracts of 1834 and the exports of Coffee. Without a doubt, under his direction the Republic was established (born under the command of the Conservative Party).

However, several revolutions had to be faced, such as the one led in Barcelona and Cumaná by General José Tadeo Monagas, the Pro-Monarchist Revolution of José Dionisio Cisneros and the Pro-Colombian Revolution of Cayetano Gabante, both in Guárico during 1834. Along with this faced serious difficulties of a religious order, with the Archbishop of Caracas, Doctor Ramón Ignacio Méndez, and a politician, sponsored by soldiers dissatisfied with not intervening directly in the public administration, others by civil groups and members of the university community who supported the candidacy civilista of the doctor José María Vargas despite his reluctance to accept his application.

Finally, in 1835, José Antonio Páez delegated power to José María Vargas, the first civilian to lead the country.

== See also ==
- Dissolution of Gran Colombia
- 1827 Guayaquil sublevation
