= Presidency of José María Vargas =

Venezuelan presidential term

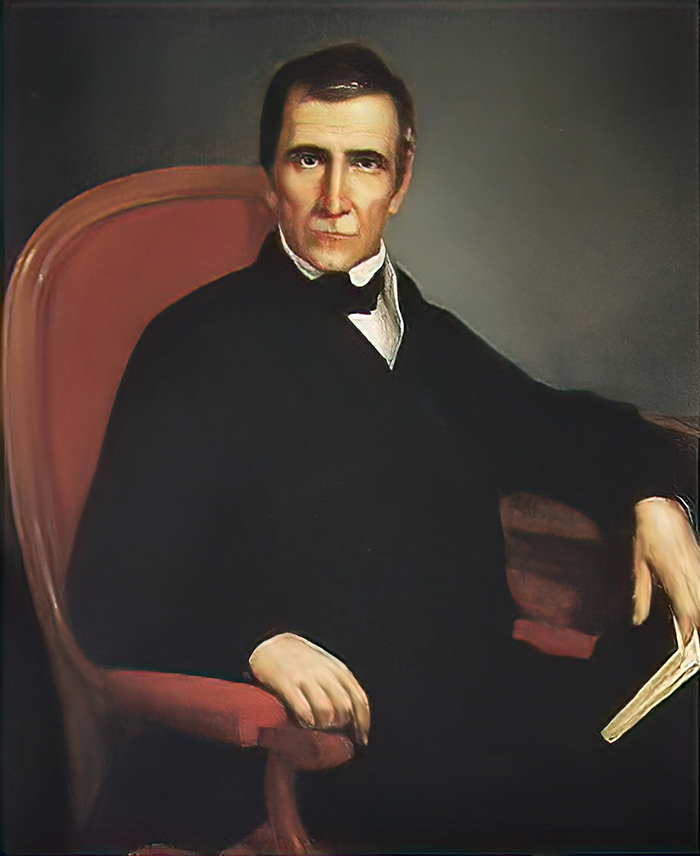
José María Vargas

The presidency of José María Vargas was initiated through indirect elections and appointment by the Congress, succeeding José Antonio Páez's first administration in 1835. As the second constitutional government of Venezuela following the country's separation from Gran Colombia, Vargas's presidency was constitutionally mandated to last until 1839 but remained uncompleted.

== Elections ==
José María Vargas defeated the caudillo José Antonio Páez in the 1835 election, achieving a dual historical milestone: Venezuela witnessed its first peaceful transition of power while simultaneously inaugurating its first civilian president, a distinguished physician, professor, and writer. Vargas formally assumed office on 9 February 1835.

== Revolution of the Reforms ==
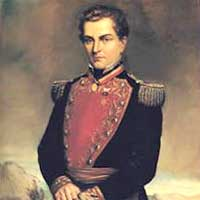
General Santiago Mariño, leader of the rebellion.

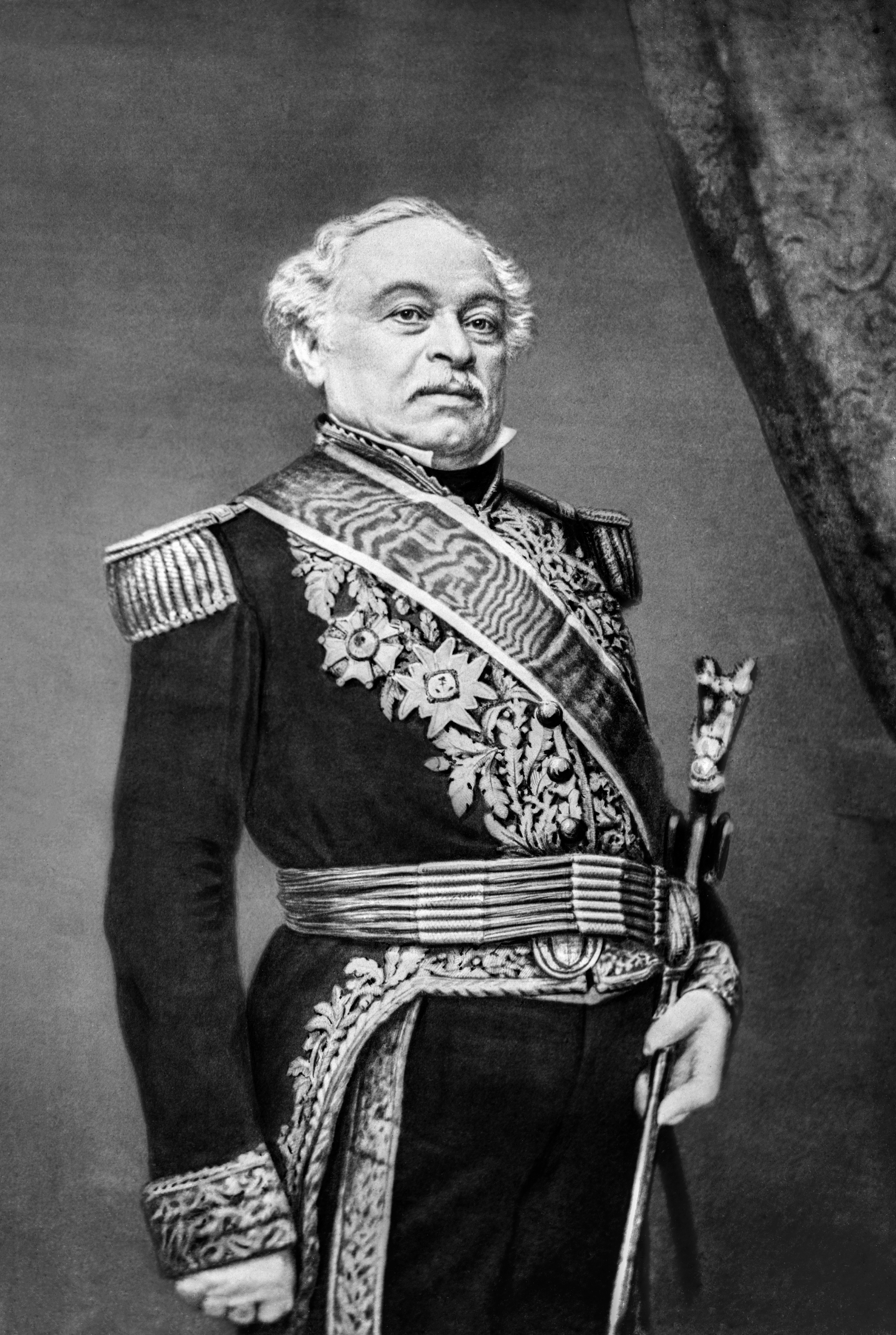
General José Antonio Páez led the reaction against the reformists.

On 8 July 1835, Vargas was arrested at his home and barred from receiving visitors due to the Revolution of the Reforms, a movement led by Santiago Mariño, Diego Ibarra, Pedro Briceño Méndez, and José Tadeo Monagas. The rebels sought to reform the 1830 Constitution and force Vargas' resignation to restore military dominance in the republic. Many of these leaders had fought in the War of Independence and believed their service entitled them to govern and influence national decisions—a role they felt had been undermined by Vargas' civilian presidency. Initially, the revolutionaries refused Vargas' resignation, but they later deposed him along with Vice President Andrés Narvarte who were exiled to the Danish island of Saint Thomas.

Before his arrest, Vargas had authorized José Antonio Páez as army commander, and Páez successfully suppressed the rebellion, reinstating Vargas. Afterwards, a decree imposing penalties on the rebels was issued, which many in society deemed unjust, leading to calls for its repeal. Despite public opposition, several rebels, including Mariño, were expelled to the Antilles.

== Resignation ==
The political situation in Venezuela remained unstable during Vargas's presidency. His resignation was formally accepted by Congress on 24 April 1836. Following his departure from office, Vargas withdrew from political life and returned to his academic and intellectual pursuits, focusing on his work as an educator and writer.

== See also ==
- Revolution of the Reforms
- First presidency of José Antonio Páez
