= Revolution of the Reforms =

Revolution in Venezuela

- Part of the Venezuelan civil wars and Venezuelan coups d'etat
Date	7 June 1835 – 1 March 1836
Location	Venezuela
Result	Restoration of the constitutional power Defeat of the insurrection Resignation of José María Vargas on 24 April 1836

Belligerents
Conservatives	Reformist rebels

Commanders and leaders
José Antonio Páez; León de Febres Cordero; José María Vargas; Andrés Narvarte; José María Carreño	Santiago Mariño; Diego Ibarra; Louis Peru de Lacroix; Pedro Briceño Méndez; José Tadeo Monagas; Estanislao Rendón; Andrés Level de Goda; Pedro Carujo; Julián Castro; Blas Bruzual

The Revolution of the Reforms was a military movement in Venezuela between 7 June 1835, and 1 March 1836, against the government of José María Vargas, the conservative Congress, and the influence of José Antonio Páez. It was led by outstanding independence heroes such as Santiago Mariño, Diego Ibarra, Pedro Briceño Méndez, José Laurencio Silva, José María Melo, Blas Bruzual, Luis Perú de Lacroix, Pedro Carujo, José Tadeo Monagas, Renato Beluche, Andrés Level de Goda, and Estanislao Rendon.

== Ideology ==
The rebels first demanded the reconstitution of Gran Colombia and political reforms such as the establishment of federalism, the establishment of military jurisdiction, the state religion and the vindication of the name of the Liberator Simón Bolívar. They denounced the existence of an "oligarchy", strengthened by import and export trade and the protection of Gran Colombia.

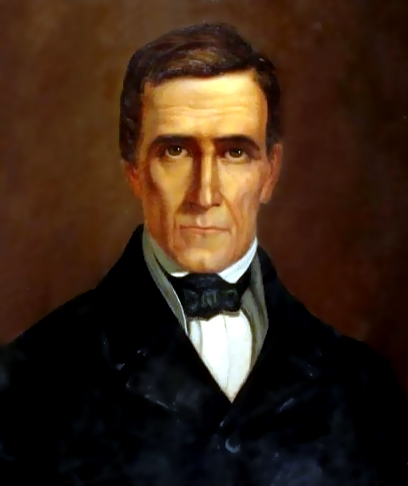
José María Vargas

The reformists challenged the government of José María Vargas and the Congress, which symbolized the coalition between the "Godo's" and "conservatives." The "Godo's" were so named for their support of Spanish rule and Royalist allegiance during the independence war, while the "conservatives" were primarily white criollos, economically and politically liberal, led by General José Antonio Páez and his followers. The military saw the restoration of lands to the "Godo's," lands previously awarded to independence fighters as military compensation, as a direct insult. Additionally, the military privileges of the Liberation Army's members were revoked.

These groups perceived the mixed center-federal government structure as a means for the oligarchies of Caracas and Valencia to assert their dominance. José María Vargas opposed Congress's proposed 1% subsidiary tax bill, but the bill was passed nonetheless. In response, Vargas accused the Senate of violating the constitution. On 29 April 1835, he tendered his resignation, citing his inability to maintain peace among the conflicting parties. Although his resignation was not accepted, his adversaries saw this as an indication of his weakening position.

== Rebellion ==
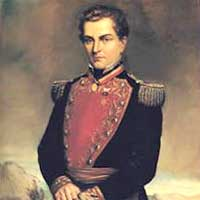
General Santiago Mariño, leader of the rebellion.

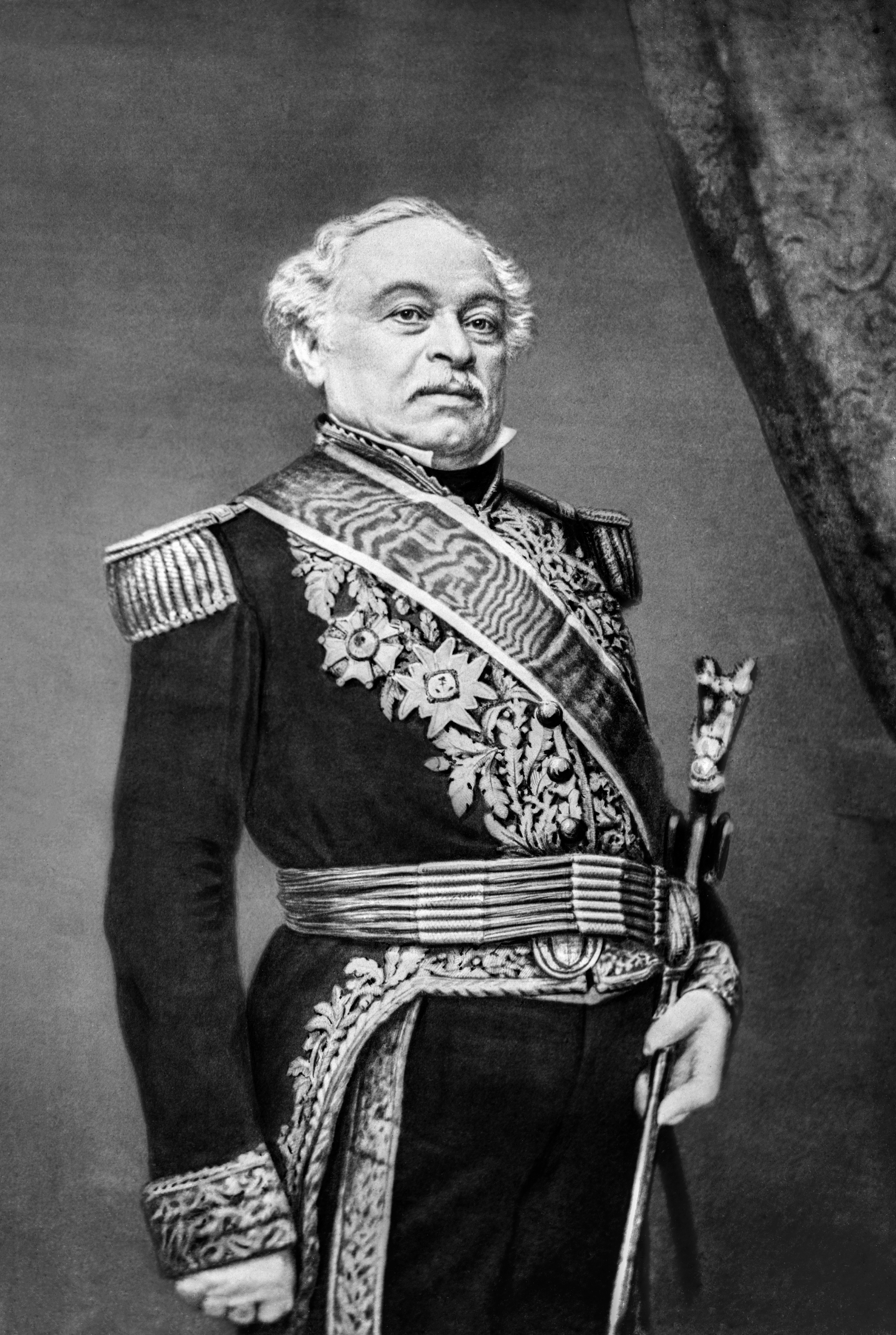
General José Antonio Páez led the reaction against the reformists.

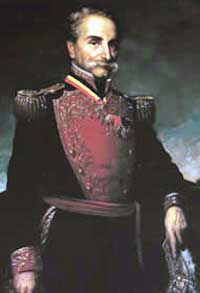
General Diego Ibarra

On 7 June 1835, the insurrection broke out in Maracaibo, proclaiming a federal system and General Santiago Mariño as head of the armed movement. Although this uprising failed, it was only the beginning of more unrest throughout the country. In Caracas, a rebellion broke out in the night of 7–8 July 1835. Pedro Carujo, chief of the Anzoátegui battalion, and then-Captain Julián Castro, placed President Vargas under house arrest on 8 July. On that occasion, the famous dialogue between Carujo and Vargas took place, which historiography has recorded for posterity: "The world belongs to the brave," Carujo tells Vargas. To which the president replies: "No, the world belongs to the just man; it is the good man, and not the brave, who has always lived and will live happily on earth and secure in his conscience".

Vargas and Vice President Andrés Narvarte were exiled to the Danish island of Saint Thomas.

After taking power in Caracas, on July 9, 1835, the military commander Pedro Briceño Méndez released a Manifesto in which he condemned both the National Constitution and the set of laws enacted during the presidency of José Antonio Páez, and it was proposed that the leadership of the reform process would be in charge of the Patriots who years before had shed their blood in the War of Independence.

General Santiago Mariño was appointed as supreme leader of the new government and General Pedro Carujo as commander of troops. After totally controlling Caracas, the movement spread throughout Venezuela, from Zulia, the east and Carabobo.

Páez, who had temporarily been removed from government, after the defeat of his candidate Carlos Soublette in the presidential elections of 1835, marched from his property in San Pablo, 190 km from Caracas, to support the dismissed authorities, from 15 July 1835. Given his military prestige and his popularity, when Páez passed through Valencia, Maracay and La Victoria, he recruited numerous militiamen and also part of the troops that, under the command of General José Laurencio Silva, had been sent from Caracas to fight it.

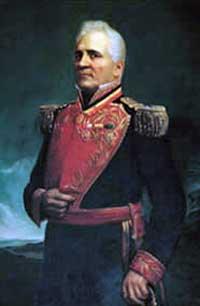
General Jose Laurencio Silva.

== Defeat ==
Páez entered Caracas on 28 July 1835, after the capital had been abandoned by the reformists. He established a Government Council and entrusted General José María Carreño in charge of the Presidency, at the same time he sent a commission to Saint Thomas to bring back Vargas and Narvarte. On 20 August 1835, Vargas recovered the presidency of the Republic.

Mariño and his followers took refuge in the east of the country, protected by José Tadeo Monagas. On 3 November 1835, Paez decreed a pardon for the main leaders of the revolution, who were still fighting in the east. Most of the rebels stopped fighting, but on 17 December 1835, a group of reformers under the command of Blas Bruzual and Pedro Carujo took the plaza of Puerto Cabello and declared the port under a state of siege. Páez and General León de Febres Cordero took part in the counterattack, in which both Bruzual and Carujo were captured on 24 December 1835.

Carujo was wounded, and as a result of the infection he died in Valencia while Bruzual was imprisoned and would later escape to Colombia. With the control over Maracaibo on 1 January 1836, and then with the surrender of Puerto Cabello on 1 March 1836, the armed conflict came to an end. After the defeat of the rebellion, President Vargas, faced with the majority of Congress, resigned from the presidency on 24 April 1836. The defeat of the reformists meant the triumph of conservative civilism and its regime of constitutional institutions.

== See also ==
- Elections in Venezuela
