= Second presidency of José Antonio Páez =

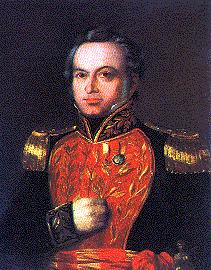
José Antonio Páez

The second presidency of José Antonio Páez (1839–1843) was elected through indirect elections, being appointed by the Congress of Venezuela and succeeding the interim government of Carlos Soublette as president of Venezuela. After completing his term, Páez handed power back to Soublette, who won the subsequent elections.

== Background ==
José Antonio Páez had been Venezuela's first president following its separation from Gran Colombia, serving from 1830 to 1834. Additionally, Páez played a key role in restoring José María Vargas to power in 1835, demonstrating his political influence.

=== Elections ===
In the 1839 elections, Páez won the presidency with 212 out of 222 electoral votes. At the time, presidential terms lasted four years.

== Domestic policy ==
=== Economy ===
In May 1841, the Banco Nacional was established, with both government and private capital. By 1842, a global economic crisis caused declines in the prices of coffee, indigo, cotton, and leather, leading to widespread bankruptcies among merchants and landowners.

=== Media policy ===
On 19 April 1839, Páez enacted a law protecting intellectual property rights for literary works. On 27 April, another law expanded freedom of the press.

=== Education ===
In 1840, part of the San Francisco Convent was granted to the Independencia School, run by Feliciano Montenegro y Colón, under the condition that it provide free education to underprivileged children.

=== Immigration ===
On 12 May 1840, Congress passed the Immigration and Colonization Law, which planned the settlement of German immigrants in Venezuela. It also restricted entry for individuals deemed criminals, sick, or fugitives from their home countries.

== Foreign policy ==
During this administration, Venezuela expanded its international relations. On 22 March 1841, a Treaty of Friendship, Commerce, and Navigation was signed with Sweden and Norway.

In 1842, Páez appointed a commission led by General Francisco Rodríguez del Toro to travel to Santa Marta, Colombia, and oversee the exhumation and repatriation of Simón Bolívar's remains to Caracas. The commission also included General Mariano Montilla and former president José María Vargas.

== Opposition ==
In 1840, the Liberal Party was founded, led by Antonio Leocadio Guzmán and Tomás Lander. This party became Páez's primary political opposition.

== See also ==
- First presidency of José Antonio Páez
- Dictatorship of José Antonio Páez
