= Fortín Solano =

18th-century colonial castle in Venezuela

- Puerto Cabello, Carabobo
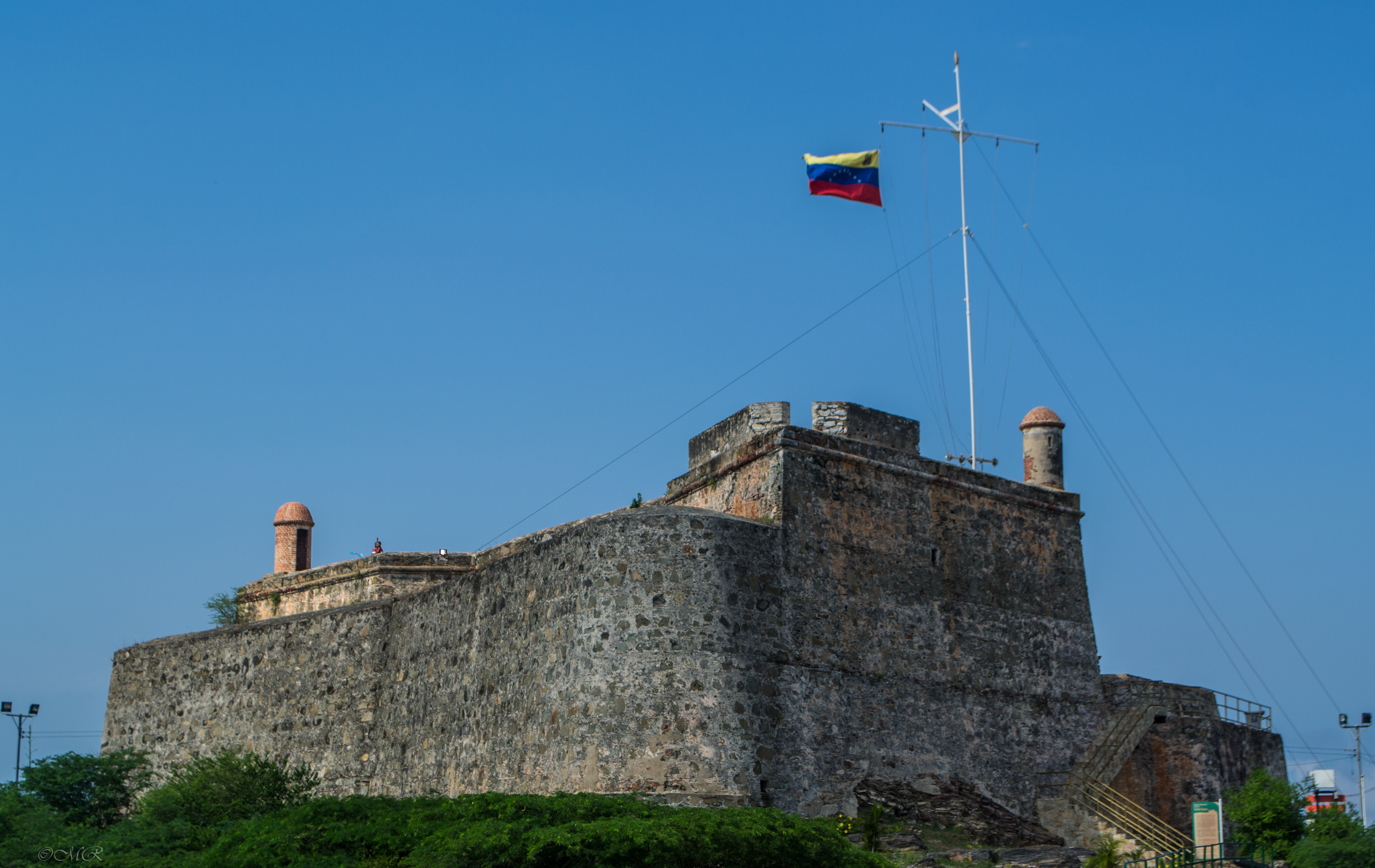
- Fortín Solano was built at the top of the Cresta de Vigía (or "lookout crest") to protect the city from naval attacks.

Site information
- Type: Fortress
- Controlled by: State government
- Open to the public: yes

Location
- Coordinates: 10.4625°N 68.016667°W

Site history
- Built: c. 1766

Fortín Solano is an eighteenth-century colonial fortification overlooking Puerto Cabello, Venezuela. With the Castillo San Felipe, an earlier fort built at sea level, it formed part of a complex of fortifications designed to protect Puerto Cabello and its important harbour from naval attacks. It was constructed c. 1766 by order of Don José Solano y Bote on behalf of the King of Spain. It has been described as the last military construction built in Venezuela during the colonial era.

The fort has been the center of several notable events in Venezuelan history. Spanish commander Antonio Zuazola was hanged after a surprise attack by the forces of Rafael Urdaneta overthrew the royalists, giving control of the fort to the patriots. Pedro Carujo was imprisoned in the fort after attempting to kill Simón Bolívar in 1828. In 1962, the fort was the stronghold of an uprising led by several commanders in the city.

It was declared a National monument in 1965 and is located inside the San Esteban National Park, which was designed in 1987.

== Description ==
Fortín Solano is located in the San Esteban National Park, south of Puerto Cabello, Carabobo. It is a military fort built by order of governor of Venezuela, Don José Solano y Bote c. 1766 in the area referred to as Cresta de Vigía (or "lookout crest"). It was designed to house artillery and was intended to protect the commercial complex of the city and the harbour from naval attacks. It was the only colonial fortification to be built between 1763 and 1771 and it is described as the last military construction built during the colonial era in Venezuela.

== History ==
=== Eighteenth and nineteenth centuries ===
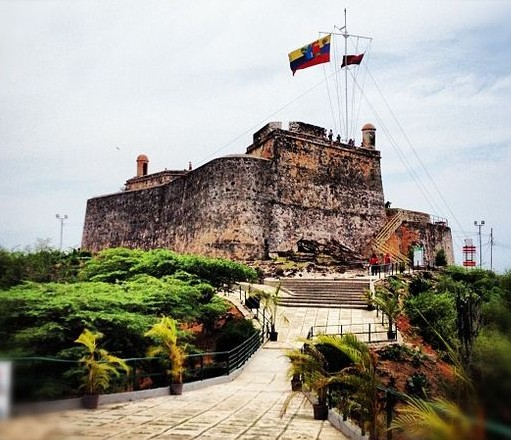
Fortín Solano

Before the construction of Fortín Solano, Puerto Cabello had resisted attacks from the British in the Battle of Puerto Cabello. Puerto Cabello continued to be controlled by Spanish forces after the fort's construction in 1766 until it was lost to Venezuela patriots on September 1, 1813. A surprise attack took place, aided by the forces of Rafael Urdaneta, in the midst of the Admirable Campaign in the Venezuelan War of Independence. The following day, Spanish commander Antonio Zuazola, who was known for having mutilated hundreds of prisoners in the east of the country, was imprisoned. Simón Bolívar, leader of the patriots, offered Domingo de Monteverde, leader of the royalists, the exchange of Zuazola with Domingo Jalón. After the proposal was rejected by the royalists, Bolívar ordered the death of Zuazola, who was hanged from a flagpole outside the walls of the fort.

In 1828, Bolívar issued a decree establishing his dictatorship in the country; as a result, a group of young lawyers gathered to depose Bolívar and proclaim Francisco de Paula Santander as constitutional president. On the night of September 25, 1828 the conspirators attempted to assassinate Bolivar at the presidential palace; Bolívar managed to escape with the help of Manuela Sáenz by jumping from a window until the military forces restored control of the city. Pedro Carujo, born in Barcelona, became a Commander in 1828, hand picked by Simón Bolívar to lead the Military Academy founded in Bogotá. However, Carujo joined the supporters of Santander and attempted to kill Bolívar while on the revolt of September 25, for which he was sentenced to death and moved to the Solano fort in March 1829. After managing to escape several months later, he was recaptured and irons were attached to him. He was deported to Curacao in June 1830, only to return several months later under the government of José Antonio Páez.

=== Twentieth century ===
In 1904, a budget designed by engineer Germán Jimenez was approved by the Ministry of Public Works to repair the fort.

On June 2, 1962, an uprising (the Porteñazo) led by Manuel Ponte Rodriguez, commander Pedro Medina Silva and Lieutenant Commander Victor Hugo Morales occurred in the city of Puerto Cabello. As soon as the national Government became aware of the revolt, troops of both the Air Force and the Army led by Colonel Alfredo Monch are sent to bomb and surround the city. At the same time, most of the officers in command of 55th National Guard squadron and detachment refuse to participate in the uprising. The following day, the Ministry of Interior announced that Armed forces loyal to the government defeated the rebellion with a balance of 400 deaths and 700 wounded. On June 6, Fortín Solano, which was used as a stronghold by the rebels, fell when the leaders of the revolt were captured by the Army.

=== Conservation ===
The fort was declared a National monument in 1965.

It is included in the boundaries of the San Esteban National Park which, as well as being of ecological importance, protects other infrastructure dating from the colonial era, including the Camino de los Españoles, a route to Valencia del Rey.

== See also ==
- Puerto Cabello
- San Esteban National Park
