= State of Venezuela =

Former state in South America

State of Venezuela Estado de Venezuela (Spanish)
- 1830–1864
- Flag (from 1836) Coat of arms (from 1836)
- Motto: Dios y Federación (English: "God and Federation") (1863–1864)
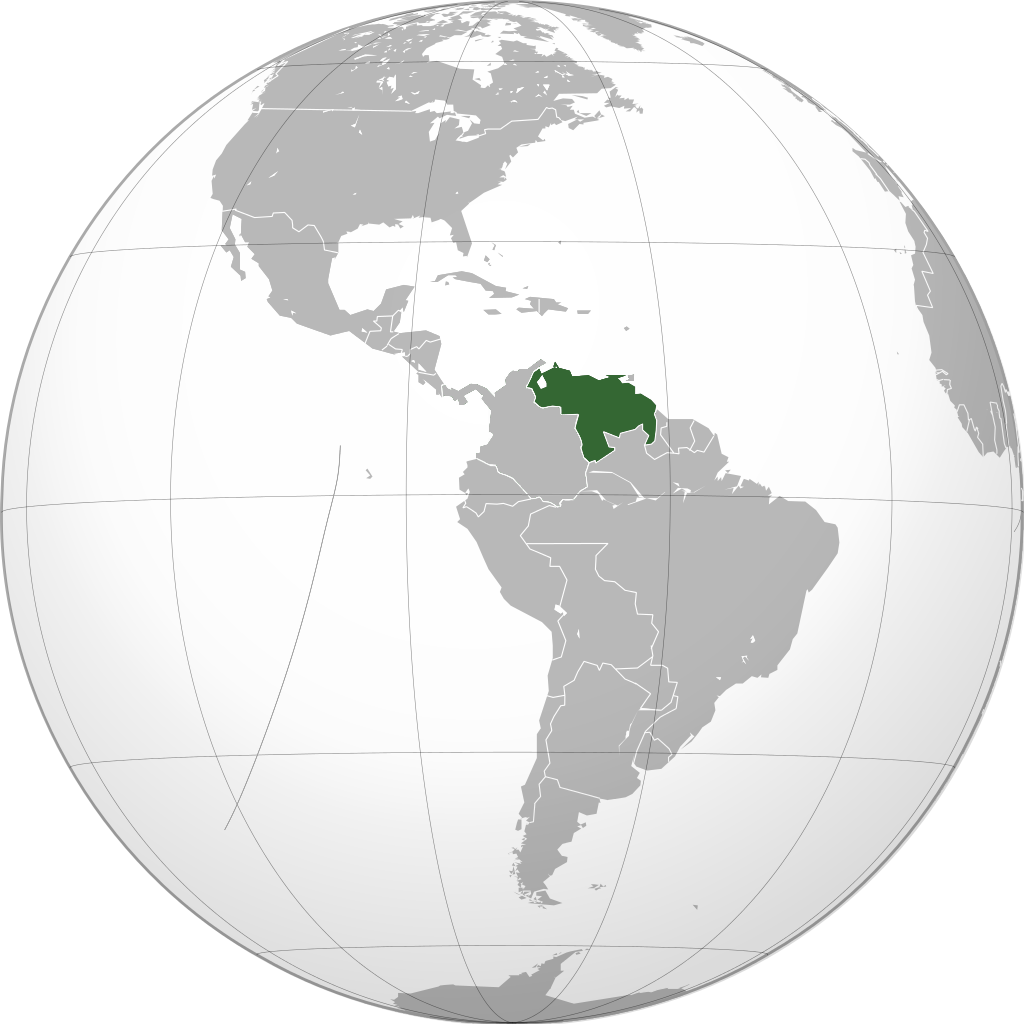
- State of Venezuela in 1860
- Capital: Caracas
- Common languages: Spanish
- Religion: Roman Catholic
- Demonyms: Venezolano (male), Venezolana (female)
- Government: Presidential republic
- President
  - 1830–1835, 1839–1843, 1861–1863: José Antonio Páez (first)
  - 1863–1864: Juan Crisóstomo Falcón (last)
- Vice President
  - 1830–1864: List
- Legislature: Congress
- History
  - Congress of Valencia: 24 September 1830
  - Constitution of 1864: 22 April 1864
- Currency: Peso
Preceded by	Succeeded by
Colombia	United States of Venezuela
- Today part of: Venezuela; Guyana

The State of Venezuela was the official name of Venezuela adopted by the constitution of 1830, during the government of José Antonio Páez. The name was maintained until 1856 when in the constitution promulgated in that year it changes the official name of the country to Republic of Venezuela. In the Constitution of 1864, the United States of Venezuela was established.

== History ==
=== Páez government ===
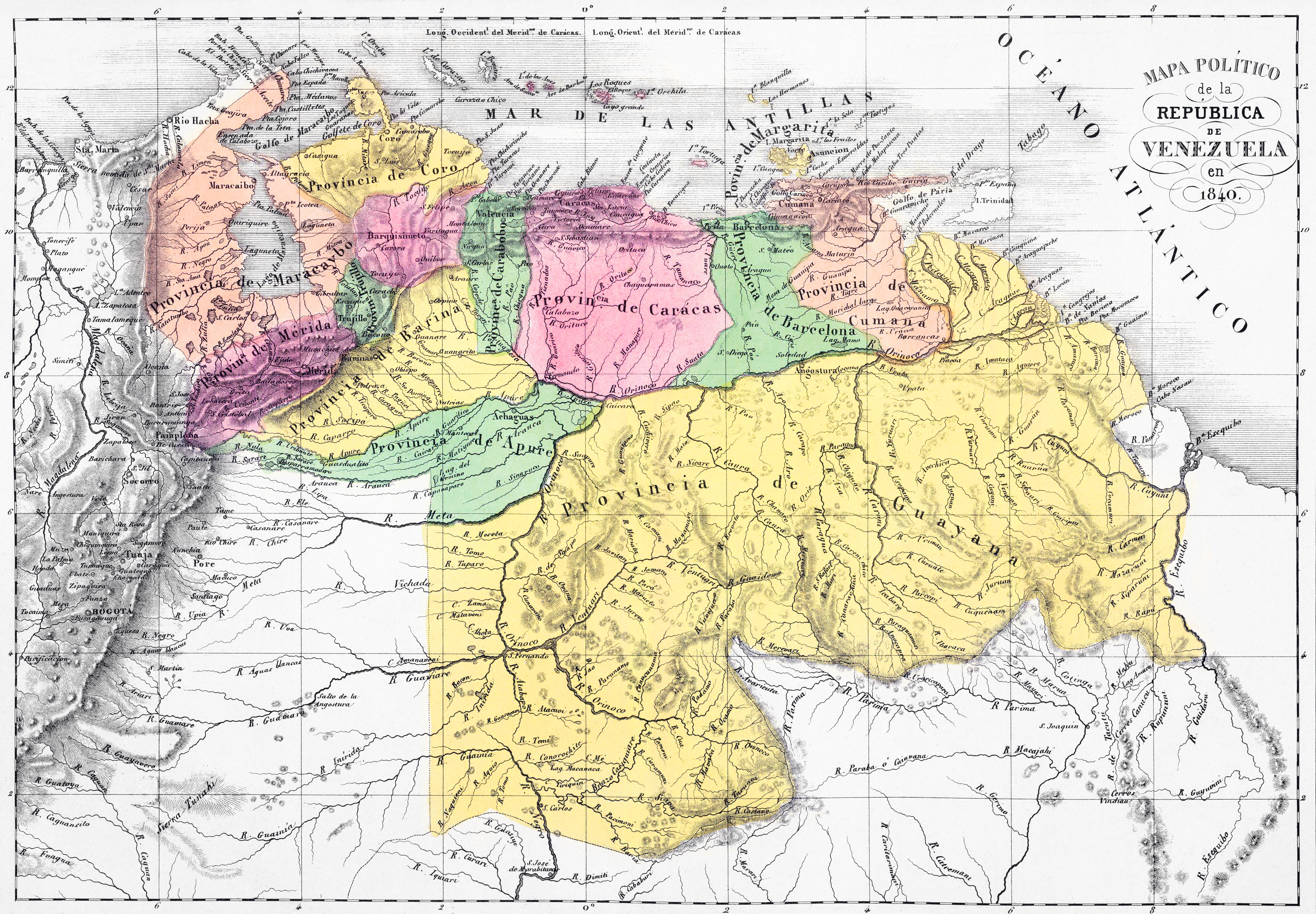
1840 Map of the State of Venezuela

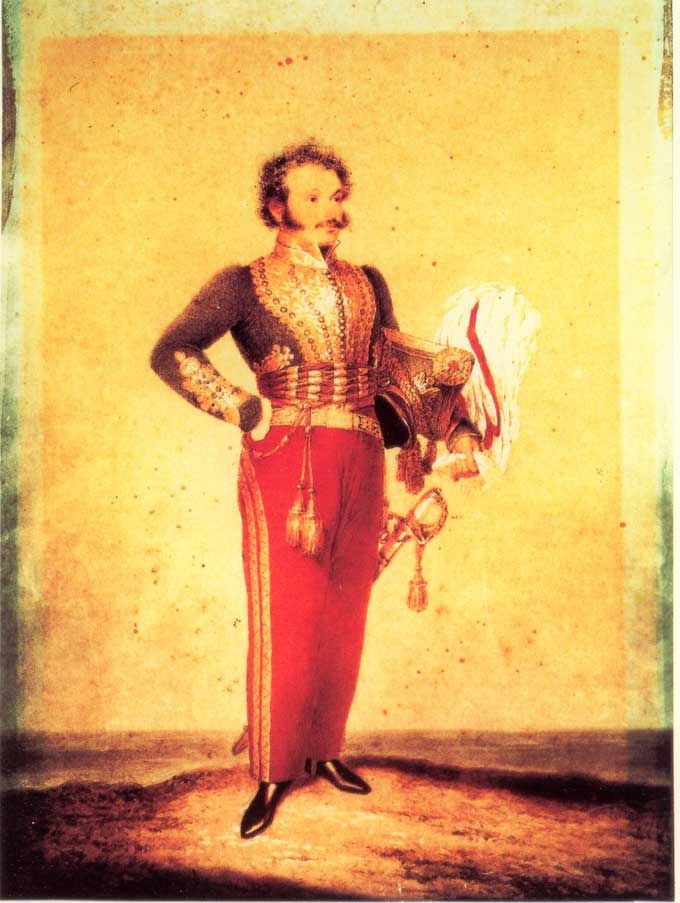
Páez in 1828, shortly before his rise to power

Páez ruled either as president or as the man-behind-the-throne from 1830 to 1846; and later, from 1860 to 1863, as dictator. A distinguished military leader in the independence war and a colleague of Bolívar, Páez had a strong claim to the Presidency, especially as, despite his pardo origins, the white oligarchy in Caracas supported him enthusiastically.

Although the 1830 Constitution prescribed democracy, tradition and practical difficulties militated against the actual working of a republican form of government, and in practice an oligarchy governed the nation.

During his first year in office Páez created a three-man Office of Foreign Relations within the Ministry of Finance. It had little occasion to deal with war-related diplomacy between Venezuela and other states, because Venezuela had only small military forces and they had the primary function of protecting the presidency from internal threats and of maintaining order. (This has remained the essential role of the Venezuelan military to the present day.) The Foreign Office dealt mostly with difficulties involving foreign citizens doing business in Venezuela: especially breaches of contract, damage to persons and property during civil strife, and acts of oppression such as illegal imprisonment of aliens.

Doctor José María Vargas, like Páez a member of the Conservative Party, became President in February 1835. As a civilian, he had the support of some who wanted an alternative to the independence-war military veterans who had predominated in Venezuelan politics. In July 1835 the Revolution of the Reforms led by José Tadeo Monagas outed Vargas, but he returned to power when Páez defeated the rebels. He resigned permanently in April 1836.

Monagas, the leader of the rebellion, had served as a distinguished independence-war general. Although defeated, he suffered few consequences because he had his base in the Eastern llanos, a region where Páez had no effective control. Besides, Monagas had as much right as Páez to count among the "liberators" of Venezuela and he had the additional credential that, whereas Páez had turned his back on Bolivar's Gran Colombia, he, at least in principle, had manifested his allegiance to it until its disintegration was irremediable.

=== Monagas government ===
Independence-war general Carlos Soublette, a Conservative, became president in 1837. Páez succeeded him in 1839, but Soublette took the reins from Páez again in 1843, and governed until 1847.

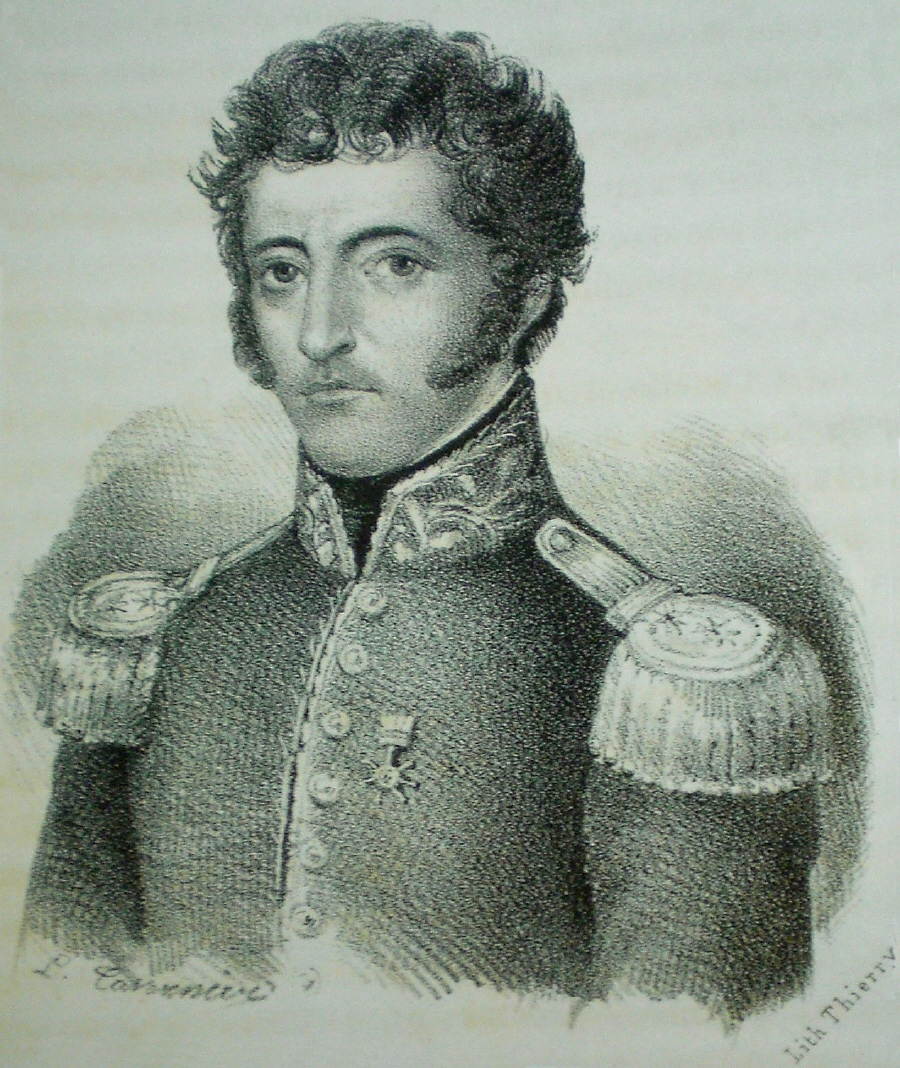
José Tadeo Monagas in 1841

Soublette proved an honest but lackluster president, in some ways a foil to Páez, and he could not prevent the "election" of Monagas to the presidency in 1847. It is the accepted wisdom that all the "elections" that are mentioned as occurring in the Venezuelan 19th century were a sham or non-existent, but this is not exactly accurate. There were elections, but these were held at the municipal level and of course the pardos had no vote. This tradition of indirect elections through local councils would last in Venezuela until 1945.

While President, Monagas broke with the Conservative Party. In 1848, his supporters assaulted parliament and he imposed personal rule and sent Páez into exile. His younger brother, José Gregorio Monagas, won election as President for the 1851–1855 term and also governed dictatorially. José Tadeo returned as President in 1855 but resigned in March 1858 in the face of an insurrection in Valencia which was led by Julián Castro and included elite members of both the Conservative Party and the Liberal Party.

Both brothers governed as Liberals. José Gregorio abolished slavery in 1854, and José Tadeo abolished capital punishment.

The eastern llanos produced many caudillos because its economy was open to international trade and the exports from that region (cattle, hides, coffee) were staples of the Venezuelan economy.

=== Federal War and fate ===
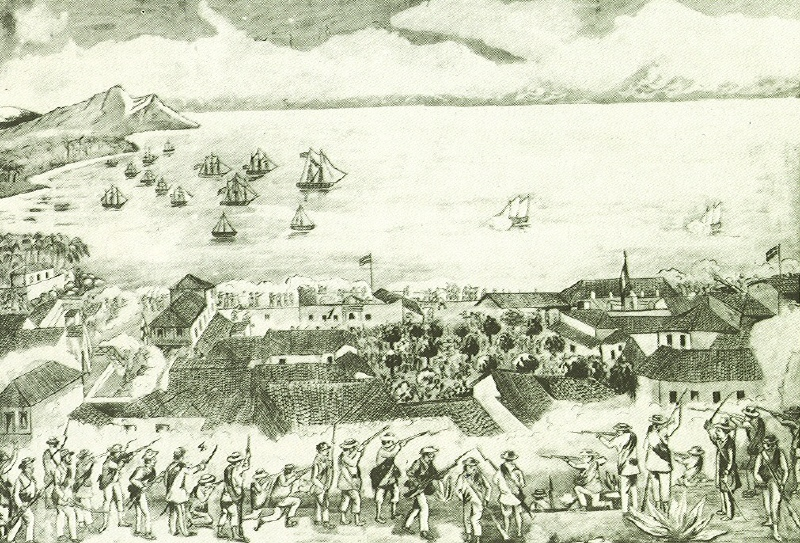
Battle of Maiquetía, during the beginning of the Federal War. 2 September 1859

Three days after José Tadeo Monagas' resignation, Julián Castro seized the Presidency in a coup d'état.

Castro became the first military President who had not fought in the War of Independence. Castro was a creature of the Caracas-Valencia oligarchy and not very effectual. During his presidency, there was a proliferation of aspiring caudillos in Caracas itself and he exiled them all. This was what provoked the Great War of the Caudillos, called in Venezuelan historiography the Guerra Federal or the Federalist War, although federalism was not what these men really had in mind. Castro was not competent either as president or as soldier and he handed power to the civilians of the oligarchy, who were soon being overwhelmed by insurrections in the central and western llanos, with Federalist leaders including Ezequiel Zamora.

José Antonio Páez was called backed from exile in the United States, and ruled as dictator from 1861 to 1863; but could no longer rule as a powerful caudillo and was forced to surrender to the leader of the federalists, Juan Crisóstomo Falcón.

The result of the War of the Caudillos was that the official denomination of Venezuela was changed from "republic" to the "United States of Venezuela", a national name it had, as well as the motto "God and Federation", until Marcos Pérez Jiménez changed it back to "republic" in the mid-20th century.

== Administrative divisions ==
=== 1830 ===
1. Apure
2. Barcelona
3. Barinas
4. Carabobo
5. Caracas
6. Coro
7. Cumaná
8. Guayana
9. Maracaibo
10. Margarita
11. Mérida

=== 1831 ===
1. Apure
2. Barcelona
3. Barinas
4. Carabobo
5. Caracas
6. Coro
7. Cumaná
8. Guayana
9. Maracaibo
10. Margarita
11. Mérida
12. Trujillo

=== 1832 ===
1. Apure
2. Barcelona
3. Barinas
4. Barquisimeto
5. Carabobo
6. Caracas
7. Coro
8. Cumaná
9. Guayana
10. Maracaibo
11. Margarita
12. Mérida
13. Trujillo

=== 1856 ===
1. Amazonas
2. Apure
3. Aragua
4. Barcelona
5. Barinas
6. Barquisimeto
7. Cojedes
8. Carabobo
9. Caracas
10. Coro
11. Cumaná
12. Guárico
13. Guayana
14. Maracaibo
15. Margarita
16. Maturín
17. Mérida
18. Portuguesa
19. Táchira
20. Trujillo
21. Yaracuy
