= San Esteban National Park =

National park in Venezuela

- IUCN category II (national park)
- Location within Venezuela
- Nearest city: Maracay, Puerto Cabello and Valencia
- Coordinates: 10°23′27″N 67°58′49″W
- Area: 445 km^{2} (172 sq mi)
- Established: 14 January 1987
- Governing body: INPARQUES

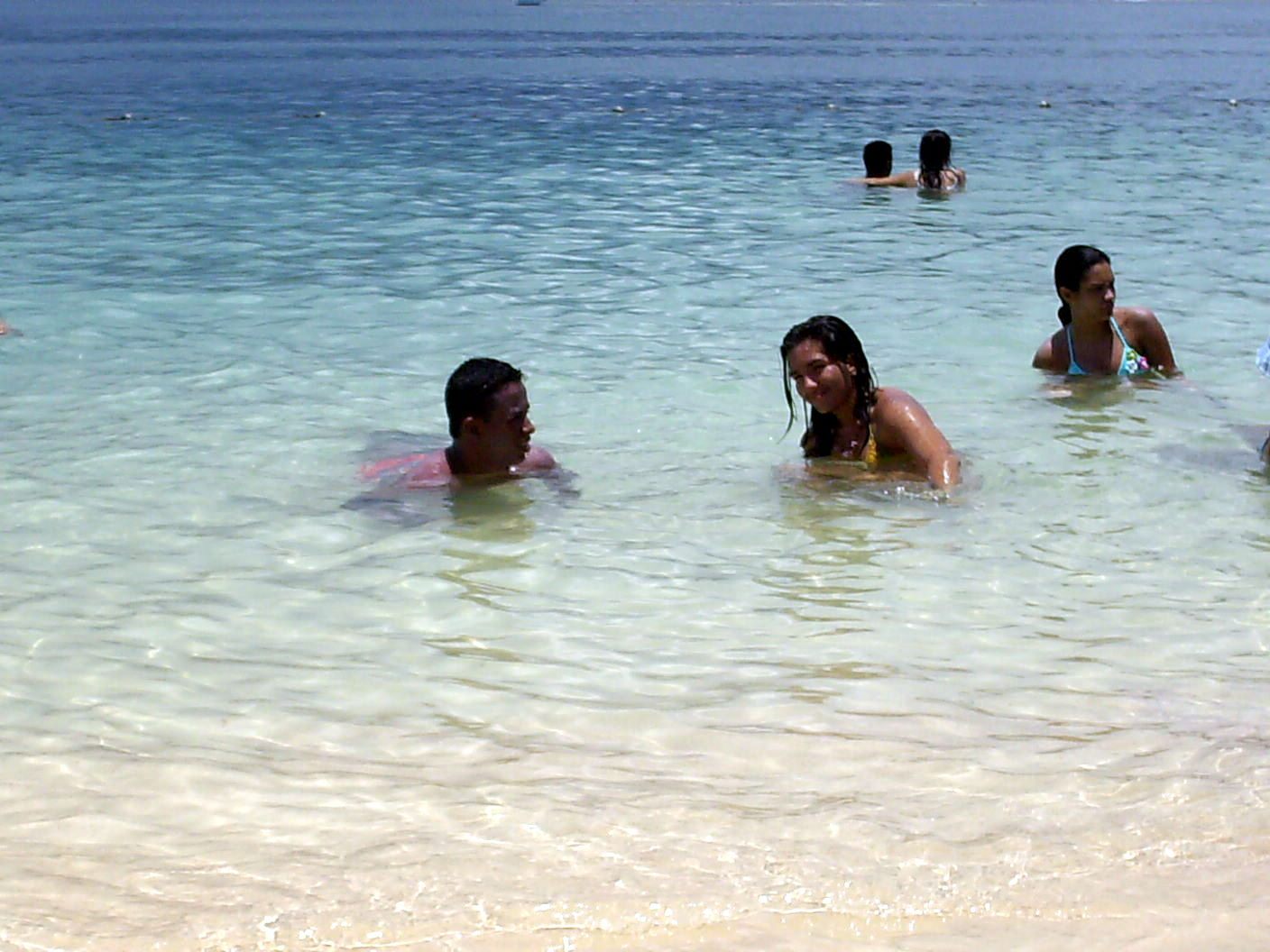
Crystal Waters of Larga Island.

The San Esteban National Park (in Spanish Parque Nacional San Esteban) is located in Carabobo, Venezuela.

The park lies on the northeastern part of Carabobo. It links with Henri Pittier National Park in Aragua.

Both are natural reservation areas. The park was created in 1987. It is 445 square kilometres in size. It lies in the municipalities of Guacara, Naguanagua, Puerto Cabello and San Diego.

== Attractions ==
The park includes Solano Castle at Puerto Cabello. It also protects other historical areas including the Parque Arqueológico Piedra Pintada located in the area of Tronconero, Vigirima, where are petroglyphs made by pre-Colonial Indians, as well as The Way of the Spanish, a path between Puerto Cabello and Valencia, and its arched bridge; the town of San Esteban, home of national hero Bartolomé Salom, and the Indian Salt Way between Patanemo and Guacara.

== Historical places ==
- Castle of Solano
- Village of San Esteban
- Ecomuseum Villa Vincencio
- The house of General Bartolomé Salom
- The old colonial road or 'Road of the Spaniards' that used to link Valencia with Puerto Cabello
- The bridge of Paso Hondo on the San Esteban river
- The Indian Road of the Salt between Patanemo and Guacara
- The Hacienda Quinta Pimentel
- The thermal baths and spa centre of Las Trincheras
- Petroglyphs of Vigirima, also known as Tronconero's Painted Stone

== Fauna ==
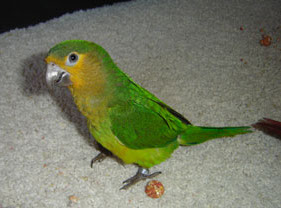
Aratinga pertinax

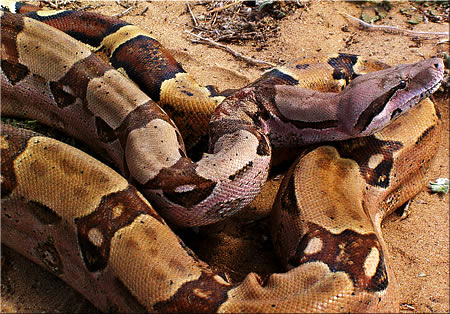
Boa constrictor

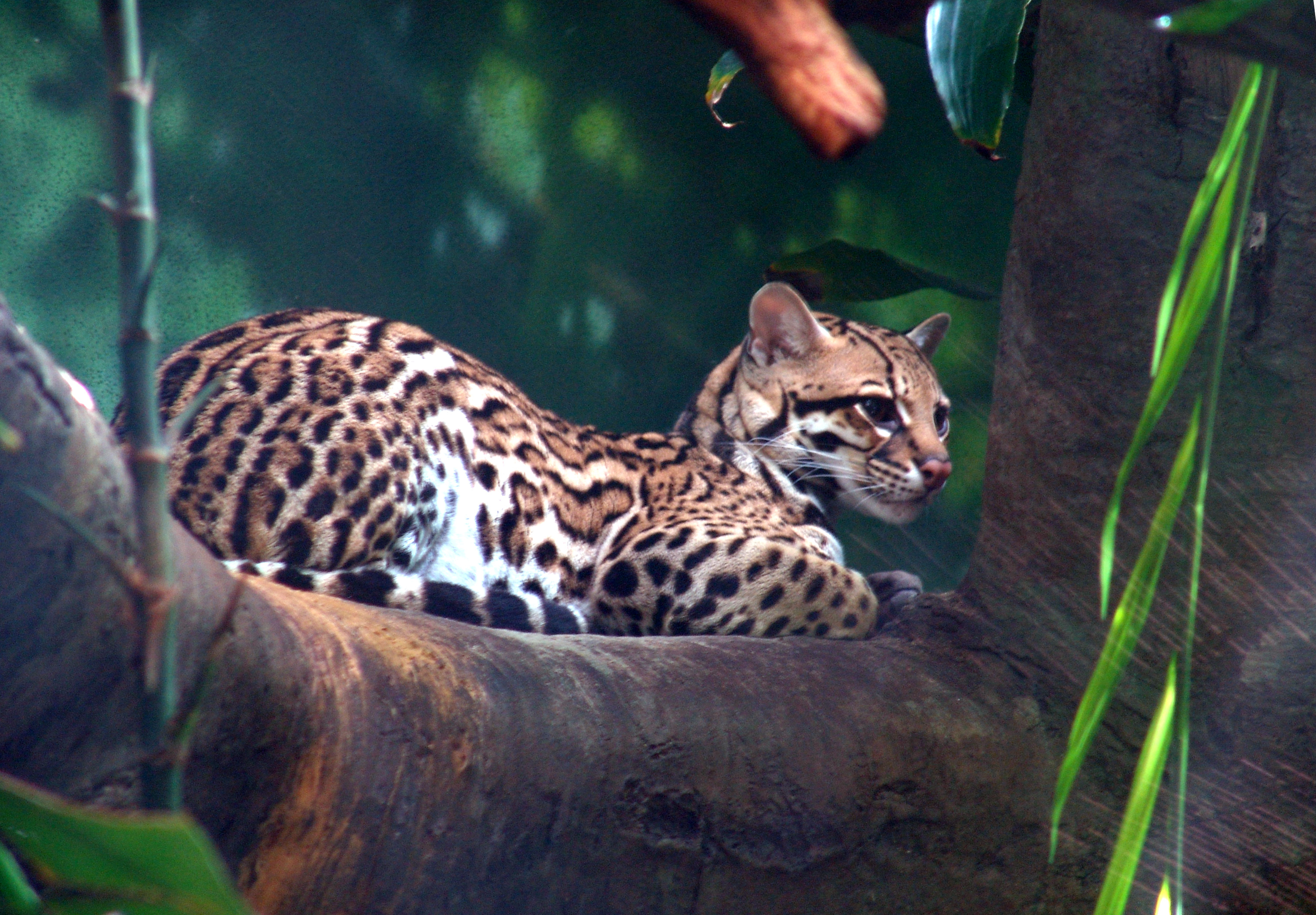
Ozelot

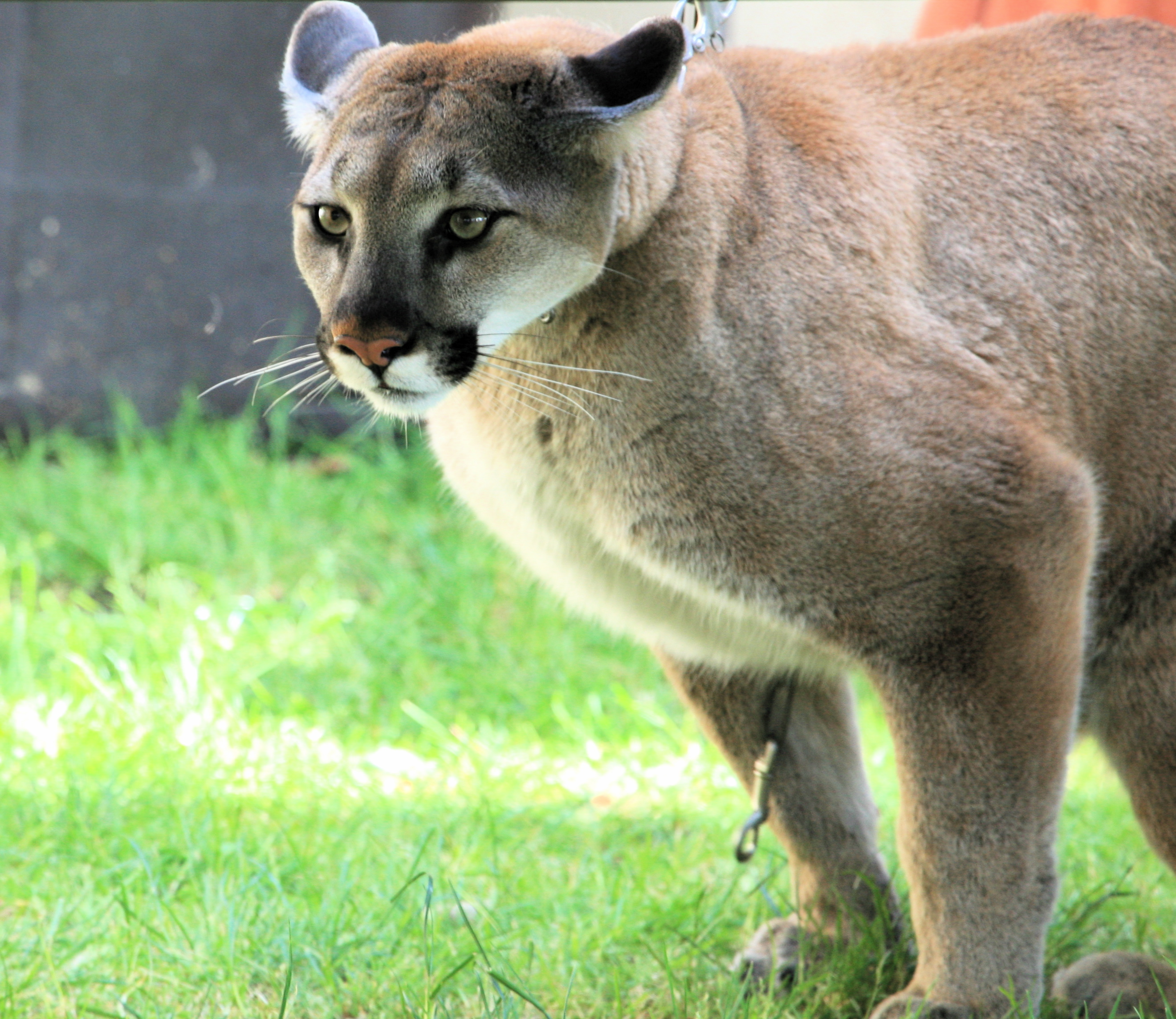
Puma
