= Dictatorship of José Antonio Páez =

1861–1863 government in Venezuela

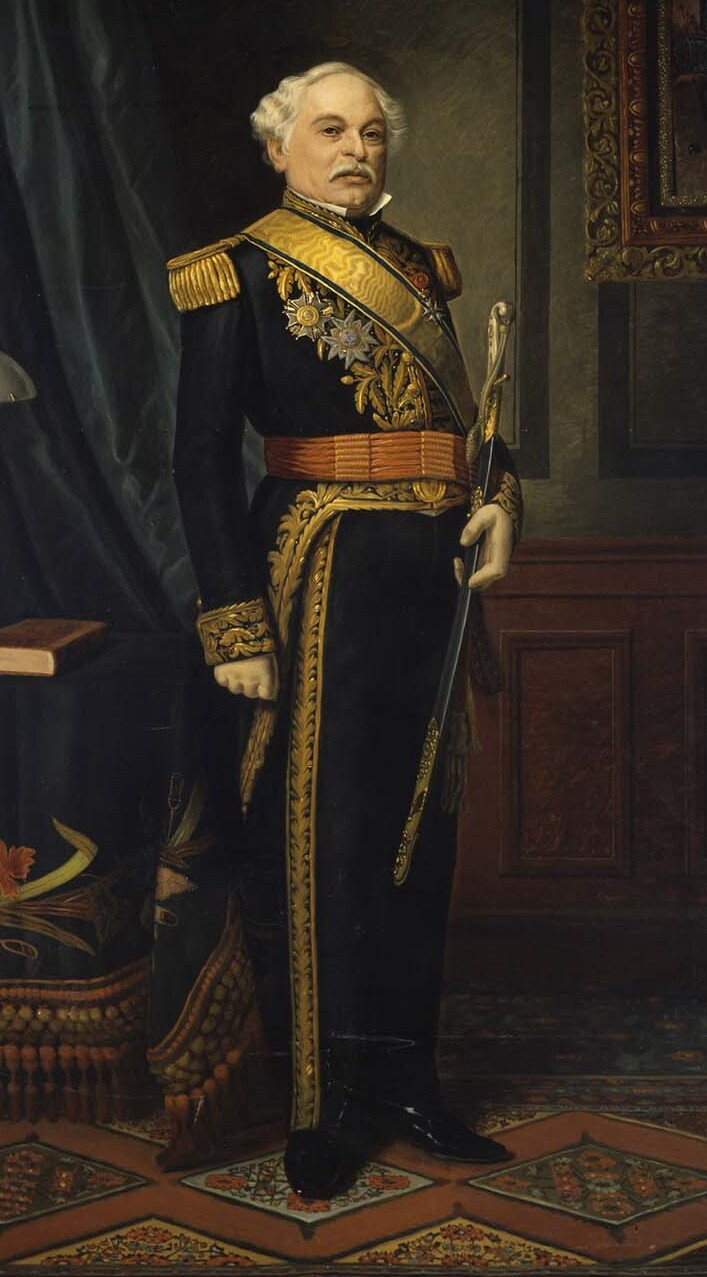
José Antonio Páez.

The dictatorship of José Antonio Páez was his third and final government, this time as the supreme civil and military leader of Venezuela during the Federal War. On this occasion, Páez did not come to power through elections but assumed control after a coup against President Pedro Gual, who was arrested with his approval and later exiled. He ruled as a dictator between 1861 and 1863, focusing his efforts on winning the war, while de facto governance was exercised by his minister Pedro José Rojas.

Páez failed in his goal of restoring order in the country under his influence and resigned, going into exile in Argentina. He was succeeded by the government of Juan Crisóstomo Falcón, marking the beginning of four decades of liberal-aligned rule.

== Domestic policy ==
Páez proposed a policy of "peace and union", which was ignored.

=== Legislative policy ===
José Antonio Páez issued the Decree of 10 September 1861, assuming control of the government as Supreme Chief and annulling the 1858 Constitution, which, in his own words, granted him "unlimited power" under the justification of "pacifying the Republic and reconstituting it under a popular republican system." The following year, he enacted the Decree of 1 January 1862, reorganizing the Supreme Chief's government and further expanding his authority.

In his 1862 decree, Páez declared that "each province shall be administered by a governor, whose functions and duties I will establish in a special decree".

=== Economy ===
In 1861, the Bank of Venezuela was established. Páez also exempted essential goods from import duties that year. However, in 1862, the Bank of Venezuela collapsed. Meanwhile, the American Civil War (1860–1865) had triggered a "cotton boom" for Venezuela since its outbreak, which continued during Páez's rule. On 15 February 1862, he enacted Venezuela's first Commercial Code.

=== Human Rights ===
In his 1862 decree, Páez declared that "freedom of worship shall continue to be permitted without restriction in the Republic".

== Resignation ==
Throughout his rule, he led the centralist forces in the Federal War on behalf of the Conservative Party against the federalist rebels. The conflict ended with a treaty signed by Páez and Juan Crisóstomo Falcón, establishing an Assembly of Plenipotentiaries in June 1863. This body appointed Falcón as provisional president, marking the end of Páez's dictatorship and his political influence in Venezuela.

== Opposition ==
=== Liberal Party ===
The main opponents of Páez were associated with the Liberal Party, including Juan Crisóstomo Falcón, Antonio Leocadio Guzmán, and Antonio Guzmán Blanco.

=== Social and economic sectors ===
A faction of Caracas' bourgeoisie appealed to the British Foreign Office, requesting military intervention against both sides (Páez's supporters and the federalists) to end the war. In exchange, they offered to "cede the territory of Guayana and negotiate it with United Kingdom, using it to pay off foreign debts owed to british subjects, as well as the Republic's external debt". However, this did not materialize. Among the signatories of the letter were Pedro Gual and Manuel Felipe de Tovar.

== See also ==
- First presidency of José Antonio Páez
- Second presidency of José Antonio Páez
- 1861 Venezuelan coup d'état
