= José María Carreño =

Venezuelan politician and military person

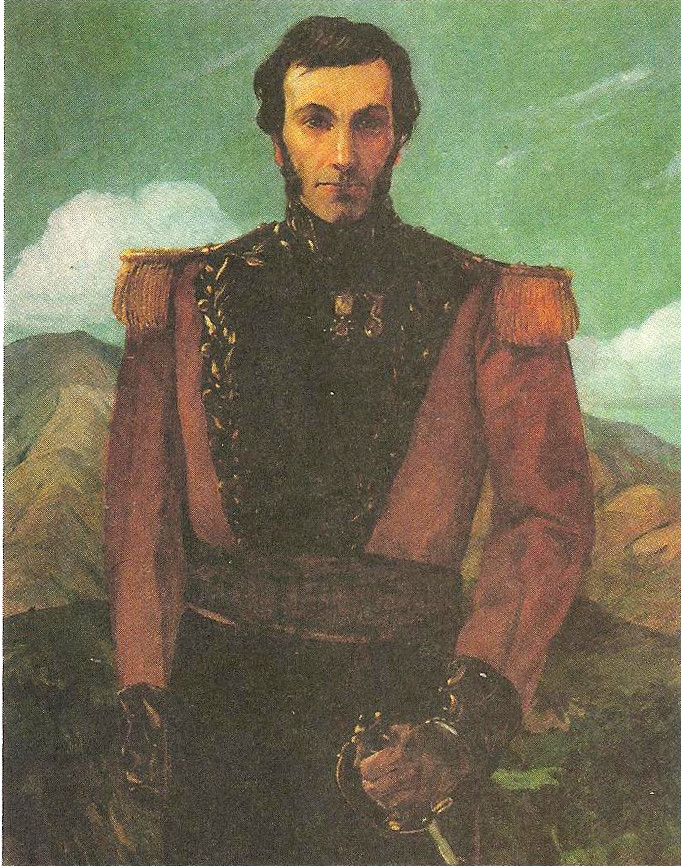

President of Venezuela (interim)
- In office 27 July 1835 – 20 August 1835
- Preceded by: José María Vargas
- Succeeded by: José María Vargas
- In office 20 January 1837 – 11 March 1837
- Preceded by: Andrés Narvarte
- Succeeded by: Carlos Soublette

Personal details
- Born: 19 March 1792 Cúa, Province of Caracas, Captaincy General of Venezuela, Viceroyalty of New Granada, Spanish Empire
- Died: 18 May 1849 (aged 57) Caracas, Province of Caracas, Venezuela
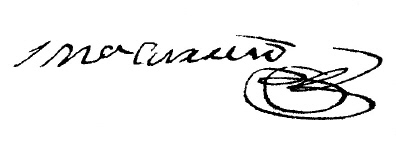
- Signature

Jose Maria Carreño Blanco (19 March 1792 in Cúa, Province of Caracas, Captaincy General of Venezuela, Viceroyalty of New Granada, Spanish Empire – 18 May 1849 in Caracas, Province of Caracas, Venezuela) was a Venezuelan politician and military person. He was vice-president in the government of José María Vargas, and provisional president of Venezuela as interim caretaker in 1837.

== Biography ==
Jose Maria Carreño lent his shirt to Simón Bolívar, right after his death. There is little information about Carreño Blanco.

On 20 January 1837, in agreement with the constitution, concluded the period of Andrés Narvarte, being designated as president of Venezuela. Jose Maria Carreño, in his position of vice-president of the Government Council, exerted his functions with the collaboration of Felipe Fermín Paul, the Minister of the Interior, José Felix Blanco in the War and Navy Ministry, and Manuel Maria Echeandía in Outer Relations.

On 11 March 1837, Carlos Soublette was designated vice-president of Venezuela, and on 10 April, of that year, assumed the presidency of the Republic, a position that Soublette carried out until concluding the constitutional period that Vargas initiated in 1835.

José María Carreño was a Mason in the 3rd degree. Carreño died on 18 May 1849 in Caracas, Venezuela.

== See also ==
- Presidents of Venezuela
- List of presidents of Venezuela

Political offices
Preceded by José María Vargas	President of Venezuela (interim); 27 July 1835 – 20 August 1835	Succeeded by José María Vargas
Preceded by Andrés Narvarte	President of Venezuela (interim); 20 January 1837 – 11 March 1837	Succeeded by Carlos Soublette
