= Louis Peru de Lacroix =

Louis Peru de Lacroix (French pronunciation: [lwi pəʁy də lakʁwa]; 14 September 1780 – 1837) was a French general who battled in the army of Napoleon I and later travelled to Colombia, where he joined the army of Simón Bolívar. He is famous for his biographical work of Bolívar, El Diario de Bucaramanga, a valuable source of information for historians about Bolívar's beliefs and private life.

== Life ==
Peru de Lacroix was born in Montelimar, France. His full name was Jean Louis Michel Pérou Delacroix, and his parents were Jean Baptiste Laurent Agricol Pérou Delacroix and Jeanne Maussier. Both of them had family roots in Ajaccio, Corsica, of Genoese ancestry, who often traveled to Portugal.

Peru de Lacroix studied in a military school in Brienne-le-Château. Later, was admitted to the École Royale Militaire de Paris and lived in Naples between 1810 and 1812. Performed as General under Napoleon I and Joachim Murat, and also took part in the campaign against Russia in 1812.

In 1816 traveled to America, where he took part in Simón Bolívar's marine. Then, in 1823, was invited by Bolívar to join his army, and as a confidant and a right-hand man he accompanied Bolívar in Bucaramanga during the Convención de Ocaña. In the year 1828, as a result of his conversations with Bolívar, Louis Peru de Lacroix wrote El Diario de Bucaramanga.

While in Colombia he married on January 25, 1825, in Tunja (Boyacá) to Dolores Mutis Amaya, grand niece of José Celestino Mutis and had three children. Today, Peru de Lacroix's direct descendants and relatives live in Colombia and northern Mexico, the United States of America and in Western Europe.

== Bibliography ==
- RESTREPO, José Manuel [et al.], Genealogías de Santafé de Bogotá, Editorial Gente Nueva, Santafé de Bogotá, 1995, Tomo IV.
- LACROIX, Louis Peru de, Diario de Bucaramanga: vida pública y privada del Libertador Simón Bolívar, Editorial Bedout S.A, Medellín, 1964, 10ª edición.
