= San Felipe Castle =

Fort in Puerto Cabello, Venezuela

- Part of defences of Puerto Cabello
- Puerto Cabello, Carabobo
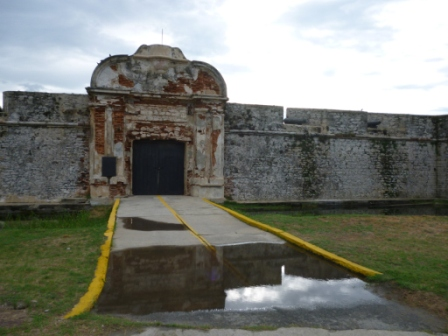
- San Felipe Castle

Site information
- Type: Fortress
- Open to the public: limited opening (is situated within a naval base)

Site history
- Built: c. 1732

San Felipe Castle is an eighteenth-century star fort protecting Puerto Cabello in Venezuela. It was named in honour of Philip V, King of Spain at the time of its construction in the 1730s. It has an alternative name Castillo Libertador, explained by its connection with Simón Bolívar, known as El Libertador (The Liberator) because of his role in Latin American independence.

== History ==
At the time of the castle's construction, Puerto Cabello was a trading centre of the Guipuzcoan Company of Caracas. The castle was intended to protect the settlement and its important harbour from piracy and conflicts with rival colonial powers. The castle resisted an attack from the Royal Navy in the Battle of Puerto Cabello (1743). Despite this victory over the fleet of commodore Charles Knowles, the Spanish continued to strengthen the fortifications of Puerto Cabello and built another fort, Solano Castle, above the town.

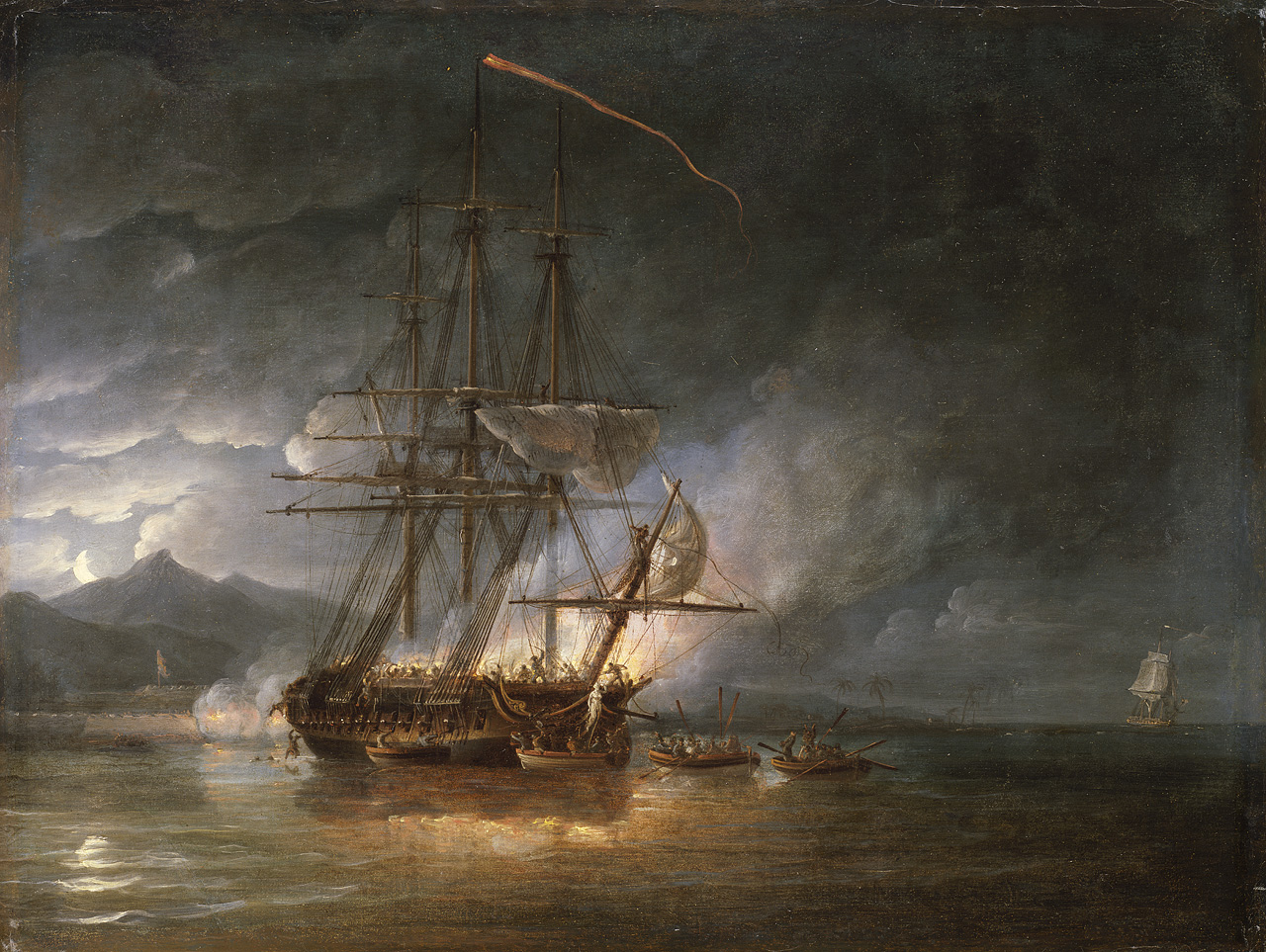
San Felipe castle batteries in action in ‘The capture of the ‘Hermione’ (a painting exhibited at the Royal Academy in 1800).

By the 1770s Puerto Cabello came to be the most fortified town on the Venezuela’s coast. The San Felipe castle and the Solano fortress remain from the period. The port came under attack from British forces retrieving the frigate Santa Cecilia (former HMS Hermione). Under the command of Captain Don Ramon de Chalas, the vessel sat in Puerto Cabello until Captain Edward Hamilton, aboard HMS Surprise cut her out of the harbour on 25 October 1799. The Spanish casualties included 119 dead; the British took 231 Spaniards prisoner, while another 15 jumped or fell overboard. Hamilton had 11 men injured, four seriously, but none killed. Hamilton himself was severely wounded.

At the beginning of the nineteenth century San Felipe Castle was involved in the Venezuelan War of Independence. The castle was held briefly by the forces of the First Republic of Venezuela. In 1812 Simón Bolívar, then a colonel in the independist forces, was appointed commandante of Puerto Cabello. He left later the same year after a royalist rebellion broke out.

In 1821 the Spanish retreated to the castle after their defeat at the decisive Battle of Carabobo and Bolivar decree the siege of Puerto Cabello. In 1822, the Marechal Francisco Tomás Morales assumed the supreme command of the forces of Puerto Cabello and Sebastian de la Calzada brigadier was appointed deputy chief. As of August 3, 1823 as a result of the capitulation of Morales to the Republicans in Maracaibo, Calzada remained as the last commander of the fort, a position he held until 10 November of the same year when he surrendered his forces to the Venezuelan caudillo José Antonio Páez.

The castle came under Anglo-German attack in the Venezuelan crisis of 1902–03 and according to press reports was left in ruins.

In 1962, Puerto Cabello was the site of an uprising, known as El Porteñazo, by pro-Fidel Castro naval officers, marines, and members of the FALN. Although loyalist naval forces were able to quickly take back the base and arrest the rebels, they were unable to prevent the marines from occupying the city and arming pro-Castro forces. Despite ambushes and bloody house-to-house fighting, loyal National Guard and mechanized regular forces were able to retake Puerto Cabello.

== Use as a prison ==
The prisoners held in the castle have included the poet Andrés Eloy Blanco, who wrote a poem about it, Barco de Piedra (1937).

== See also ==
- Cutting out of the Hermione
