= Constitution of Venezuela (1830) =

Former constitution of Venezuela

Political Constitution of the State of Venezuela
- Provisional coat of arms of Venezuela (1830-1836).
- Ratified: September 22, 1830
- Date effective: September 24, 1830
- Repealed: April 16, 1857
- Author: Members of the Congreso de Valencia
- Signatories: 48 Members of Parliament
- Subject: Independence of Venezuela from Colombia.
- Purpose: To establish a federal center state under a republican, popular, representative, responsible and alternative system of government.

The Constitution of Venezuela of 1830 (official name: Constitution of the State of Venezuela. Spanish: Constitución del Estado de Venezuela) was the fourth Magna Carta in force in Venezuela from 1830 to 1857, being the second most valid Venezuelan fundamental law. Approved by the Constituent Congress of Valencia, on September 22, 1830 and promulgated by General José Antonio Páez two days later. The Constituent Congress of 1830 that sanctioned it had begun its sessions in the city of Valencia on May 6, 1830, with the attendance of 33 deputies of the 48 that had been elected in representation of the provinces of Cumaná, Barcelona, Margarita, Caracas, Carabobo, Coro, Mérida, Barinas, Apure, Barquisimeto, Guayana and Maracaibo. In March 1857 this text was repealed when the Constitution of 1857 was approved and promulgated.

The end of the validity of the constitutional text of 1830 marked the beginning of a period through which many constitutional texts would be promulgated with the sole intention of perpetuating the Venezuelan caudillo in the presidency of the Republic. The Revolution of the Reforms of 1836, the social revolts promoted by Antonio Leocadio Guzmán in 1842, the sectarianism of the Conservative Party, the assault on the National Congress in 1848, the first government of José Tadeo Monagas and the subsequent election of his brother José Gregorio Monagas, represent the political context of post-independence Venezuela. The Congress of Valencia designed the national organization by means of the three classic public powers, namely: Legislative, Executive and Judicial.

== Composition and characteristics ==
It consists of a Preamble and 228 articles distributed in 28 Titles.

=== Preamble ===
Formed by the deputies of the Provinces of Cumaná, Barcelona, Margarita, Caracas, Carabobo, Coro, Maracaibo, Mérida, Barinas, Apure and Guayana.

In the name of Almighty God, author and supreme legislator of the universe.

We the Representatives of the People of Venezuela in Congress assembled, in order to form the most perfect union, establish justice, ensure domestic tranquility, provide for the common defense, promote general happiness, and secure the precious gift of liberty, for ourselves and our descendants, do ordain and establish the present Constitution:

— Constitution of the State of Venezuela 1830

=== Title One: Of the Venezuelan Nation and its territory. ===
The first title comprises articles one through five, and establishes the principles of sovereignty and independence and the geographic understanding under the principle of Uti possidetis iuris and the territorial organization of the Nation, as stated in Article 5:

The territory of Venezuela comprises all that before the political transformation of 1810 was called the Captaincy General of Venezuela. For its better administration it will be divided into Provinces, Cantons and Parishes, whose limits will be fixed by law.

=== Title Two: Government of Venezuela ===
The second title comprises articles six through eight, and establishes the form of government adopted by the Nation, the exercise of sovereignty by the people and the composition of the national power, called in the referred Constitution as the Supreme Power; such as the Legislative, Executive and Judicial Powers.

=== Title Three: About Venezuelans ===
The third title comprises articles 9 to 11, and establishes the principles of nationality, either by birth or by naturalization. Article 11 refers to naturalization, where any man can adopt the nationality if he has participated in the independence cause.

=== Title Four. Of the duties of Venezuelans. ===
The fourth title comprised only one article, Article 12, and established the duties of citizens. It read as follows:

Article 12.- The duties of every Venezuelan are: to live subject to the Constitution and the laws, to respect the authorities that are its organs, to contribute to the public expenses, and to be ready at all times to serve and defend the homeland, making the sacrifice of his property and his life if necessary.

=== Title Five. On the political rights of Venezuelans. ===
The fifth title comprises articles 13 to 16, and establishes the constitutional guarantees for the inhabitants of the Nation, which had a classification of the persons who could enjoy or not the referred guarantees or the persons whose exercise of rights could be suspended. Article 14 states that only the following have rights:

Article 14.- In order to enjoy the rights of a citizen it is necessary to

- To be Venezuelan;
- To be married, or older than 21 years of age;
- To know how to read and write; but this condition shall not be obligatory until such time as may be designated by law;
- To be the owner of real property whose annual income is fifty pesos, or to have a profession, trade, or useful industry that produces one hundred pesos annually, without dependence on another in the class of domestic servant, or to enjoy an annual salary of one hundred and fifty pesos.

At the same time, the following article lists the citizens who lose these rights:

Article 15.- The rights of citizen are lost:

- By becoming naturalized in a foreign country;
- By admitting employment in another government without the permission of the Congress, having any of honor or trust in the Republic;
- For committing oneself to serve against Venezuela;
- For condemnation to corporal or infamous punishment, as long as rehabilitation is not obtained.

The present title of the Constitution does not contain a declaration of fundamental rights like other constitutional provisions, but only deals with the citizens entitled to assume public office and/or the exercise of suffrage.

=== Electoral system ===
They constituted the sixth to ninth titles of the Constitution. The electoral system was of an indirect nature and proceeded as follows:

==== Title Six: Elections in general ====
The initial provision for the elections read as follows:

Article 17.- The citizens shall always bear in mind that the national spirit is born from the interest that all take in the elections, which by stifling the parties assures the manifestation of the general will; and that the duration, the conservation and the good of the Republic depend mainly on the success of the elections in the primary and electoral assemblies.

The sixth title comprises articles 17 to 19, and establishes the legal framework by which the collegiate instances for electoral purposes were constituted, called Parish Assemblies whose competencies were to elect an Elector or Electors according to the demographics of the parish (in accordance with the provisions of Article 23 of the Constitution), said Assemblies were previously organized by the civil authority of each parish and two noble neighbors designated by the Municipal Council of the Canton, who had to form a list of individuals who possessed the right of parish suffrage (as stated in the fifth constitutional title), said list which was the registry of the electoral mass of the parish, had to be exhibited to the public.

At the same time, another list was organized consisting of the candidates who met the qualifications (set forth in Article 27 of the Constitution) to be Elector or Electors, and were sent to the first civil authority of the Canton and to the Municipal Council who verified their content in order to qualify the evaluated candidates.

==== Title Seven: Parish Assemblies ====
It includes articles 20 through 31, and establishes the structure of the Parish Assemblies. According to the aforementioned procedures, only those Citizens could be Electors who:

Article 27.- In order to be a voter, it is required:

- To be a non-suspended parish voter;
- To be at least twenty-one years of age and to know how to read and write;
- To be a resident of any of the parishes of the Canton.
- To be the owner of real property, whose annual income is two hundred pesos; or to have a profession, trade, or useful industry that produces three hundred pesos annually; or to enjoy an annual salary of four hundred pesos.

In accordance with the provisions of the previous Constitutional Title, the organization of the aforementioned Parish Assemblies proceeded as stipulated in the following article:

Article 21.- The Parish Assembly shall be composed of the parish voters in exercise of their rights as citizens, neighbors of each parish; and shall be presided over by the chief judge of the parish with the assistance of four co-judges, who have the qualities of parish voters appointed in accordance with the law.

Once each member of the Assembly had voted, the parochial elections were considered concluded, the Judge who presided over the Assembly proceeded to send to the civil authority of the Canton (designated according to the Laws), the registry of sessions in his Parish, a closed and sealed envelope, and then together with the authorities of the Municipal Council opened the mentioned envelope and began the scrutiny process, the results were finally made public. The Elector candidate who had the majority of affirmative votes was considered elected, if there was an equality of votes, Article 30 stated that chance was the deciding factor.

==== Title Eight: Of the Assemblies, or Electoral Colleges ====
It includes articles 32 to 43, and establishes the functions and structures of this type of instances.

In accordance with the aforementioned procedures, the Electoral Assemblies or Colleges were composed of:

Article 32.- The Electoral Assemblies or Colleges shall be composed of the electors appointed by the Cantons.

The purpose of these Assemblies, once their members met, was as follows:

Article 36.- Once the Electoral Colleges have met the requirements prescribed by this Constitution, they shall proceed in their respective periods to hold the corresponding elections, to wit:

- Of the President of the State;
- For Vice President;
- Of Senators of the Province and alternates;
- Of Representative or Representatives of the same and of as many others to fill in for their absence;
- Of members for the Provincial Councils, and of an equal number of individuals in the class of alternates.

==== Title Nine: Provisions Common to Parish Assemblies and Electoral College ====
It includes articles 44 to 47, and establishes the guiding principles on the functionality of the referred Assemblies in the sessions they hold.

The provisional flag of the State of Venezuela decreed by José Antonio Páez. In force from 1830 to 1836.

=== From the Legislative Body ===
==== Title Ten: Legislative Power ====
It includes Articles 48 and 49, and establishes the body that assumes the legislative functions, such as the Congress, composed of the House of Representatives and the Senate. They had to meet every year, starting on January 20, in the capital of the Republic, for 30 more days, when necessary.

==== Title Eleventh: The House of Representatives ====
It includes articles 50 to 59, and establishes the composition of the House of Representatives or lower chamber of Congress, and the requirements for citizens who wished to be part of it under the title of Deputy, who remained in office for a period of four years. At the same time, the procedure for the dismissal of the directive of the House in case of being the object of accusations by some members of the same was also set forth.

They could be members of this Chamber according to Article 52:

Article 52.- To be a member of the House of Representatives requires:

- To possess the qualities of a voter;
- To be a native or neighbor of the province where the election is being held;
- To have a residence in the territory of Venezuela of at least two years immediately prior to the election. Not excluded for lack of this requirement are those absent in service or for cause of the Republic, and to be the owner of real property, whose annual income is four hundred pesos or to have a profession, trade or useful industry that produces five hundred pesos annually; or to enjoy an annual salary of six hundred pesos.

According to the provisions of Article 57 of the Constitution, these were the competencies of the House of Representatives:

Article 57.- The powers of the House of Representatives shall be as follows

- To concur with that of the Senate in the formation of laws and decrees, and in the other acts designated by this Constitution;
- To oversee the investment of the national revenues and to examine the annual account to be submitted by the Executive Branch;
- To hear accusations against the President, the Vice President, Ministers of the Supreme Court of Justice, Councilors and Secretaries of the office in the cases designated by this Constitution;
- To also hear accusations against other public employees for poor performance of their duties. This power does not abrogate or diminish that of other chiefs and tribunals to oversee the observance of the laws, judge and depose and punish their respective subordinates according to them.

==== Title Twelfth: The Chamber of Senators ====
It comprises Articles 60 to 71. It is similarly structured to the title referring to the House of Representatives, establishing the composition of the Chamber of Senators or upper chamber of Congress, and the requirements for citizens who wished to be part of it under the title of Senator, who remained in office for a period of four years. At the same time, and similar to the lower chamber, the procedure for the dismissal of the directive of the Chamber in case of being the object of accusations by some members of the same.

They could be members of this Chamber according to Article 62:

Article 62.- To be a member of the Chamber of Senators, it is necessary to

- To possess the qualities of a voter;
- To be at least thirty years of age; 3. to be a native or a resident of the province where the election is held
- To be a native or neighbor of the Province where the election is being held;
- To have three years of residence in the territory of Venezuela immediately before the election, with the exceptions of Article 52, and to be the owner of real property, whose annual income is eight hundred pesos; or to have a profession, trade, or useful industry that produces one thousand pesos annually; or to enjoy a salary of one thousand two hundred pesos annually.

According to the provisions of Article 65 of the Constitution, these were the competencies of the Chamber of Senators:

Article 65.- The following are attributions of the Senate:

- To concur in the formation of laws and decrees with the House of Representatives;
- To give or withhold its consent to the promotion of military officers from Colonel and Captain of a ship and above, and to any other act prescribed by this Constitution;
- To sustain and resolve lawsuits initiated in the House of Representatives.

==== Title Thirteen: On the economic functions and provisions common to both Chambers ====
It comprises Articles 72 through 86, and establishes certain constitutional rules on:

- The opening of sessions and place of residence.
- The elaboration of their own rules of procedure.
- The other constitutional magistrates who may not be Deputies or Senators.
- The immunity and indemnity that the members of the Congress enjoy in the exercise of their functions.

==== Title Fourteen: Of the powers of the Congress ====
It establishes the operative powers of Congress as a legislative body.

==== Title Fifteenth: On the formation of laws and their promulgation. ====
It includes Articles 88 to 102, and establishes the administrative procedure for the drafting, sanction and enactment of Laws. The initiative of a law could originate in any of the Chambers, and once the bill was drafted and approved, it was passed to the Executive for its enactment.

=== From the Executive Body ===
José Antonio Páez president of Venezuela (1829-1835)

==== Title Sixteen: Executive Branch ====
It includes articles 103 to 122, and establishes the structure and faculties of this public power. According to Article 103 of the Constitution, the Executive Power resided in a magistrate with the title of President of the Republic. Only Venezuelans by birth could be president, and have all the other qualities required for a Senator, elected by two thirds of the Electoral College for a period of four years without being eligible for immediate reelection after at least one constitutional term.

According to Article 109 of the Constitution, the Vice President of State was elected under the same requirements and procedures required for the President. The Vice President was elected two years after the election of the President of the Republic.

In case of absence of the President and Vice President, Article 114 stated that the absence of both was substituted by the Vice President of the Council of Government.

According to Article 117, the constitutional powers of the President of the Republic were used:

Article 117.- The President is the Head of the General Administration of the Republic, and as such has the following powers:

- To preserve internal order and tranquility and to secure the State against all external attacks;
- To order the execution, and to see to the promulgation and execution of the laws, decrees and acts of the Congress;
- To convoke the Congress in ordinary periods; and also extraordinarily with pre-consent, or at the request of the Council of Government, when the gravity of some urgency demands it;
- Holds supreme command of the land and sea forces for the defense of the Republic;
- To call the Militias into service, when the Congress has decreed it;
- To declare war in the name of the Republic, subject to the decree of Congress;
- To conduct diplomatic negotiations, enter into treaties of truce, peace, friendship, offensive and defensive alliance, neutrality, and commerce, with the approval of Congress being required to give or withhold its ratification to them;
- To appoint and remove the Secretaries of the Office;
- To appoint, in agreement with the Council of Government, the Ministers Plenipotentiary, envoys and any other diplomatic agents, consuls, vice consuls and commercial agents;
- To appoint, with the prior agreement and consent of the Senate, to all military posts from Colonel and Captain of a ship upwards and on the proposal of the respective chiefs to all lower posts, provided that the latter appointments shall always have effective command annexed to them; for all military ranks without command are henceforth abolished;
- To grant retirements and leaves of absence to military and other employees as determined by law;
- To issue patents of navigation, and also of privateering and reprisals when Congress shall determine; or in its recess, with the consent of the Council of Government;
- To grant letters of nature according to law;
- To appoint the Ministers of the Superior Courts on the proposal of the Supreme Court of Justice, on the basis of three candidates;
- To appoint the Governors of the Provinces upon the proposal of the respective Provincial Deputation;
- To appoint to all civil, military and finance posts, the appointment of which is not reserved to any other authority under the terms prescribed by law;
- To suspend from their posts the employees in the branches dependent on the Executive Power, when they violate the laws, or its decrees, or orders, with the quality of placing them at the disposal of the competent authority, within three days, with the summary or documents that have given rise to the suspension, so that it may judge them;
- Separate the same employees when, due to incapacity or negligence, they perform their functions poorly, with the prior approval of the Governing Council;
- To take care of the collection and investment of contributions and public revenues in accordance with the laws;
- To see to it that justice is administered promptly and fully by the courts and tribunals, and that their sentences are complied with and executed;
- In favor of humanity, he may commute capital punishments with the prior agreement and consent of the Council of Government, at the proposal of the court that hears the case in last instance or at the excitation of the Executive itself, provided that serious and powerful motives occur, excluding from this attribution those that have been sentenced by the Senate.

Also added to the presidential powers were special powers authorized by the Congress or the Council of Government in situations of armed internal commotion threatening internal security or sudden foreign invasion.

At the same time, Article 121 established certain limitations to the authority of the President of the Republic, such as:

Article 121.- The President of the Republic may not:

- Leave his territory while exercising the Executive Power, and one year thereafter;
- Command in person the land and sea forces, without the prior agreement and consent of Congress;
- To employ the permanent armed force in case of internal commotion, without prior agreement and consent of the Council of Government;
- To admit foreigners to the service of arms in the class of officers and chiefs, without the previous consent of Congress;
- Expel out of the territory, nor deprive any Venezuelan of his liberty, except in the case of Article 118, nor impose any penalty whatsoever;
- To halt the course of judicial proceedings, nor prevent cases from being pursued through the procedures established by law;
- To prevent the elections provided for in the Constitution from being held, nor those elected from holding office;
- Dissolve the Houses, nor suspend their sessions.

=== Of the Judicial Power ===
The first judicial magistracy resides in the Supreme Court of Justice, in the Superior Courts of Justice that are installed in 3 judicial districts; and in the tribunals and courts of important places of the Republic.

== See also ==
- La Cosiata

Preceded by Colombian Constitution of 1821	Constitution of the State of Venezuela; 1830–1857	Succeeded by Constitution of the United States of Venezuela of 1857
