= Andrés Narvarte =

President of Venezuela (1836–1837)

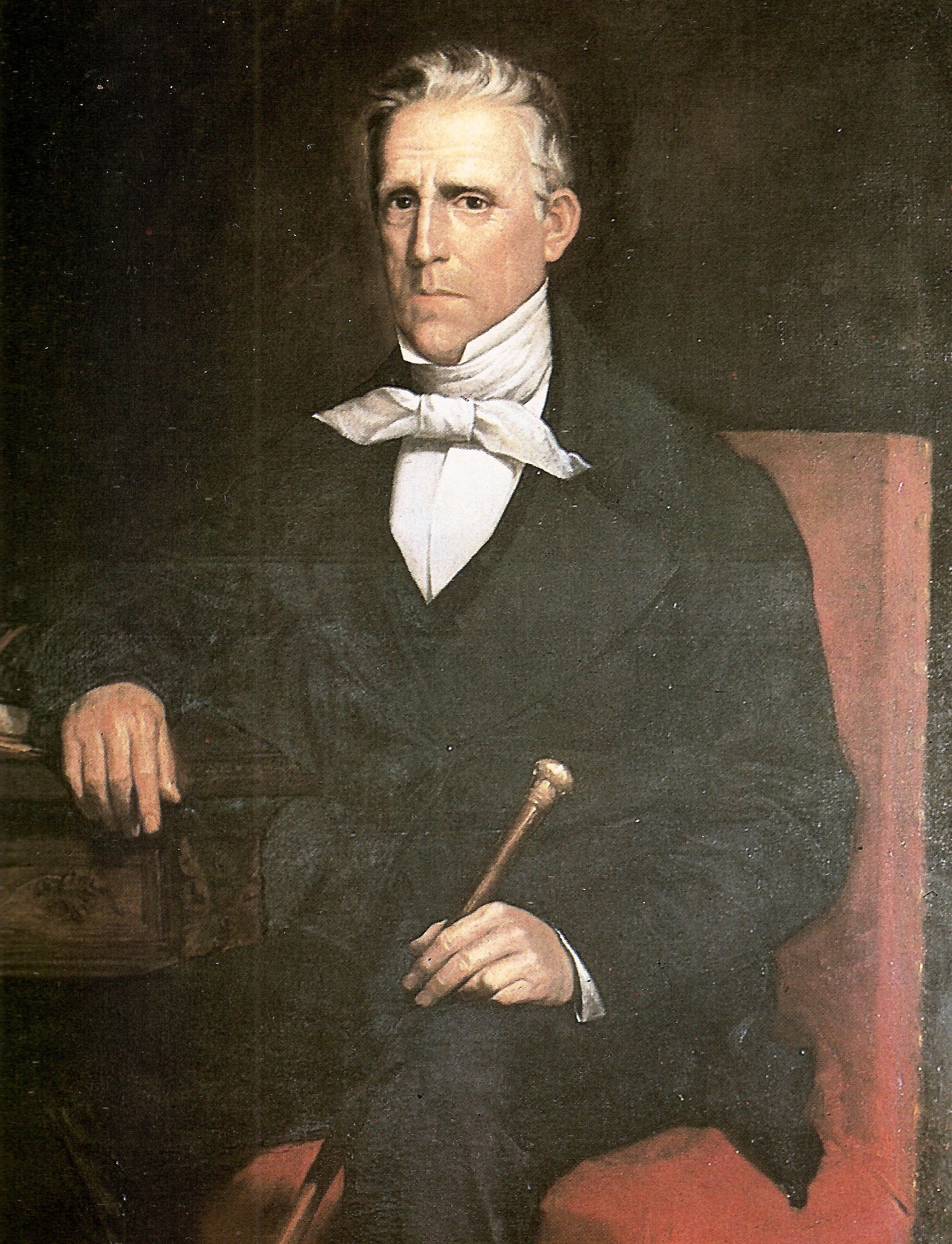
- Portrait by Martín Tovar y Tovar

President of Venezuela Interim
- In office 20 January 1835 – 9 February 1835
- Preceded by: José Antonio Páez
- Succeeded by: José María Vargas

President of Venezuela
- In office 24 April 1836 – 20 January 1837
- Preceded by: José María Vargas
- Succeeded by: José María Carreño

Personal details
- Born: 1781; La Guaira, Venezuela
- Died: 31 March 1853 (aged 71–72); Caracas, Venezuela
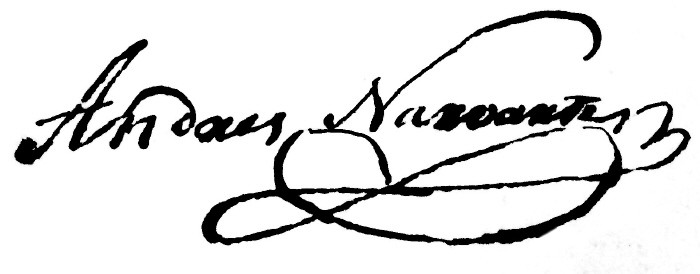
- Signature

Andrés Narvarte Pimentel (1781–March 31, 1853) was the president of Venezuela as interim caretaker (1836–1837).

== Biography ==
=== First Period (1835) ===
As Vice President of the Republic, Andrés Navarte assumed executive power between 20 January 1835 (when the new Legislative Assembly was finalised) and 9 February 1835 (when José María Vargas was elected as president).

=== Second Period (1836–1837) ===
The 55-year-old jurist returned to power after the resignation of Jose Maria Vargas, and as the vice president of Venezuela he was left with executive authority between 24 April 1836 and 20 January 1837 (nine months in total).

Political offices
Preceded by José Antonio Páez	President of Venezuela (Interim); 20 January 1835 – 9 February 1835	Succeeded by José María Vargas
Preceded by José María Carreño	President of Venezuela; 24 April 1836 – 20 January 1837	Succeeded by José María Carreño
