= Puerto Cabello =

- City
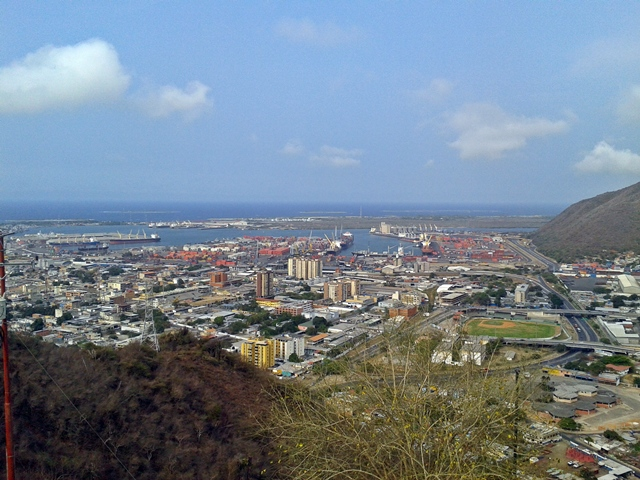

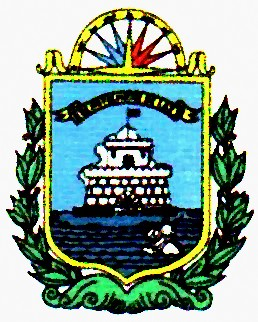
- Flag Coat of arms

- Location within Venezuela Location within the Caribbean Location within South America
- Coordinates: 10°28′00″N 68°01′00″W
- Country: Venezuela
- State: Carabobo
- Municipality: Puerto Cabello

Government
  - Mayor: Juan Carlos Betancourt

Area
  - Total: 729 km^{2} (281 sq mi)

Population (2019)
  - Total: 191,000
  - Density: 262/km^{2} (679/sq mi)
- Demonym: Porteño
- Time zone: UTC−4 (VET)
- Climate: Aw
- Website: Alcaldía de Puerto Cabello

Puerto Cabello (Spanish pronunciation: [ˈpweɾto kaˈβeʝo]) is a city on the north coast of Venezuela. It is located in Carabobo State, about 210 km west of Caracas. As of 2011, the city had a population of around 182,400. The city is home to the largest and busiest port in the country and is thus a vital cog in the country's vast oil industry. The word 'cabello' translates to 'hair'. The Spanish took to saying that the sea was so calm there that a ship could be moored to the dock with a single hair.

== History ==
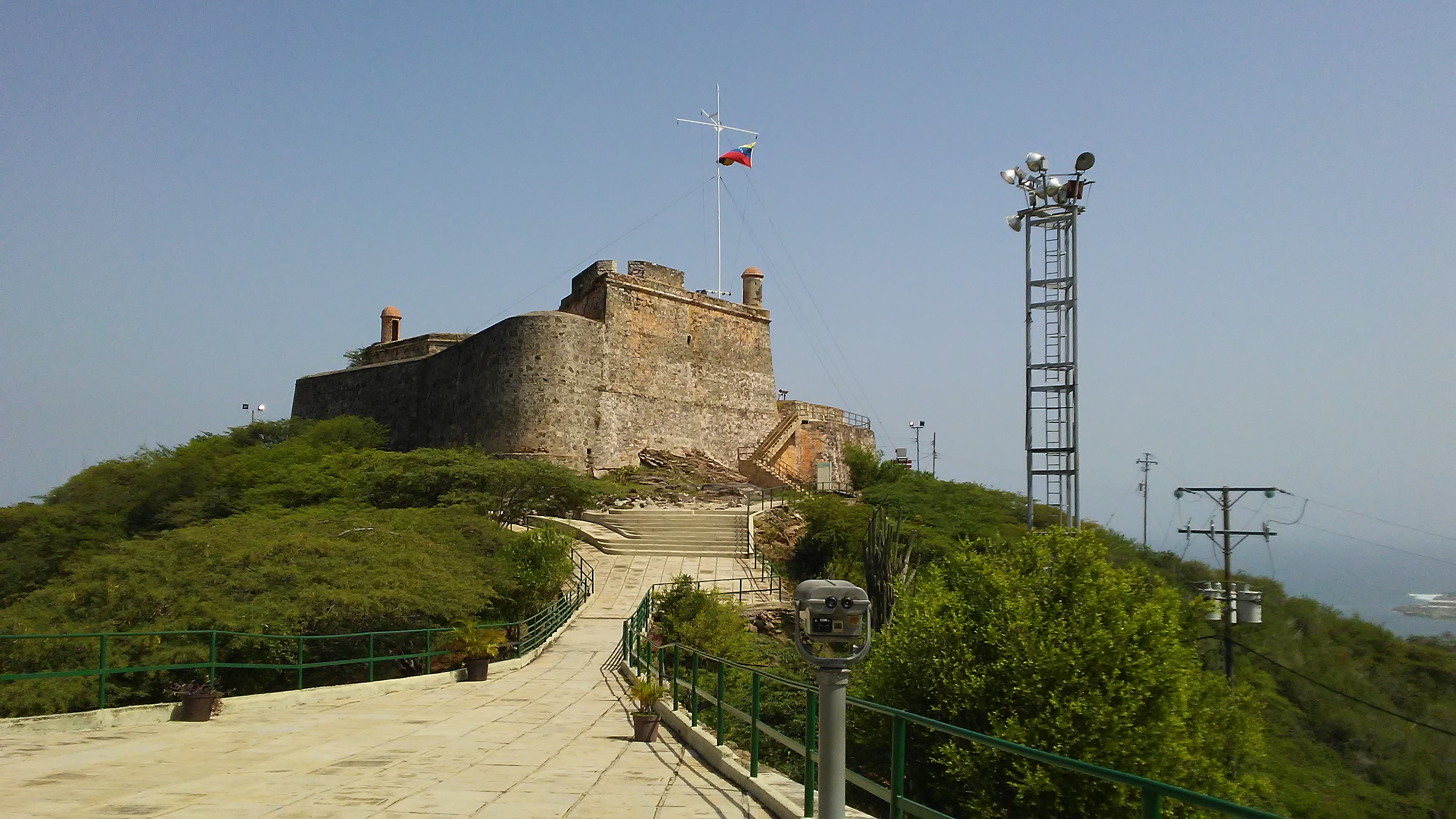
Fort Solano in Puerto Cabello

The foundation date of Puerto Cabello is not known although its name was documented for the first time on the map of the province of Caracas prepared in 1578 by Juan de Pimentel.

Puerto Cabello's location made it an easy prey to buccaneers and was a popular trading post for Dutch smugglers during the 17th century. Most of the contraband trade consisted of cocoa with neighboring island Curaçao, colonized by the Dutch. Puerto Cabello was also at that time under Dutch control.

It was not until 1730 that the Spanish took over the port, after the Real Compañía Guipuzcoana had moved in. This company built warehouses, wharves and an array of forts to protect the harbor.

During the War of Jenkins' Ear, Puerto Cabello was the careening port of the company, whose ships had rendered great assistance to the Spanish navy in carrying troops, arms, stores and ammunition from Spain to her colonies, and its destruction was a severe blow to both the Company and the Spanish government. British Commodore Charles Knowles, in command of the 70-gun HMS Suffolk, received orders in 1743 to carry out attacks Puerto Cabello and La Guaira. Governor Gabriel de Zuluaga, well informed of the plans, recruited extra defenders and acquired gunpowder from the Dutch. Consequently, when Knowle's squadron attacked La Guaira on 18 February 1743, they were beaten off by the defenders. Knowles withdrew his squadron and refitted at Curaçao before attempting an assault on Puerto Cabello on April 15, and again on April 24, but both assaults were beaten off as well. Knowles called off the expedition and returned to Jamaica.

By the 1770s, Puerto Cabello had come to be the most fortified town on the Venezuelan coast. The San Felipe castle and the Solano fortress remain from the period. The frigate Santa Cecilia (former HMS Hermione), under the command of Captain Don Ramón de Chalas, sat in Puerto Cabello until Captain Edward Hamilton, aboard HMS Surprise, cut her out of the harbour on October 25, 1799. The Spanish casualties included 120 dead; the British took 231 Spaniards prisoner, while another 15 jumped or fell overboard. Eleven of Hamilton's men were injured, four seriously, but none was killed. Hamilton himself was severely wounded.

The forces of the First Republic of Venezuela briefly held San Felipe castle. In 1812 Simón Bolívar, then a colonel in the independentist forces, was appointed commandante of Puerto Cabello. He left after a royalist rebellion broke out. In 1821 the Spanish retreated to the castle after their defeat at the decisive Battle of Carabobo.

Puerto Cabello was the last Spanish royalist stronghold during Venezuela's war for independence, it was captured by José Antonio Páez on November 8, 1823. The harbour came under Anglo-German attack in the Venezuelan crisis of 1902–03 and according to press reports was left in ruins.

In 1940 during the Second World War, six Italian-flagged ships and one German-flagged ship asked the Venezuelan government for refuge given its status as a neutral country. They were granted refuge and the seven vessels were housed in the bay of Puerto Cabello. Among the ships were: the Italian-flagged merchant ships Baccicin Padre, Teresa Odero, Jole Faccio and Trottiera and the German Sesostris. On the night of March 31, 1940, the crews of the refugee ships set fire to their own ships following the orders of the high naval command of the Rome-Berlin axis.

In 1962, Puerto Cabello was the site of an uprising, known as El Porteñazo, by pro-Fidel Castro naval officers, marines, and members of the FALN. Although loyalist naval forces were able to quickly take back the base and arrest the rebels, they were unable to prevent the marines from occupying the city and arming pro-Castro forces. Despite ambushes and bloody house-to-house fighting, loyal National Guard and mechanized regular forces were able to retake Puerto Cabello.

With the ongoing crisis amid food shortages on 23 February 2019 that coupled with economic damage, the aid that was supposed to arrive at the port was turned away by the Bolivarian Navy of Venezuela, threatening to "open fire" at it, forcing the aid to redirect back to Puerto Rico. The city was affected by the 2026 Venezuela earthquakes.

== Geography ==
Puerto Cabello is located in Carabobo State, about 210 km west of Caracas.

=== Climate ===
Puerto Cabello has a borderline tropical savanna climate (Köppen Aw), almost dry enough to be a hot semi-arid climate (BSh) as prevails further west on the Caribbean coast of Venezuela.

Climate data for Puerto Cabello
Month	Jan	Feb	Mar	Apr	May	Jun	Jul	Aug	Sep	Oct	Nov	Dec	Year
Mean daily maximum °C (°F)	30 (86)	29 (85)	30 (86)	30 (86)	31 (87)	31 (87)	31 (87)	31 (88)	32 (89)	31 (88)	30 (86)	30 (86)	31 (87)
Mean daily minimum °C (°F)	22 (72)	22 (72)	23 (73)	23 (74)	23 (74)	23 (74)	24 (75)	23 (74)	24 (75)	25 (77)	24 (75)	23 (74)	23 (74)
Average rainfall mm (inches)	99 (3.9)	33 (1.3)	10 (0.4)	43 (1.7)	89 (3.5)	76 (3)	110 (4.3)	99 (3.9)	64 (2.5)	61 (2.4)	94 (3.7)	100 (4.1)	878 (34.7)
Source: Weatherbase

== Tourism ==
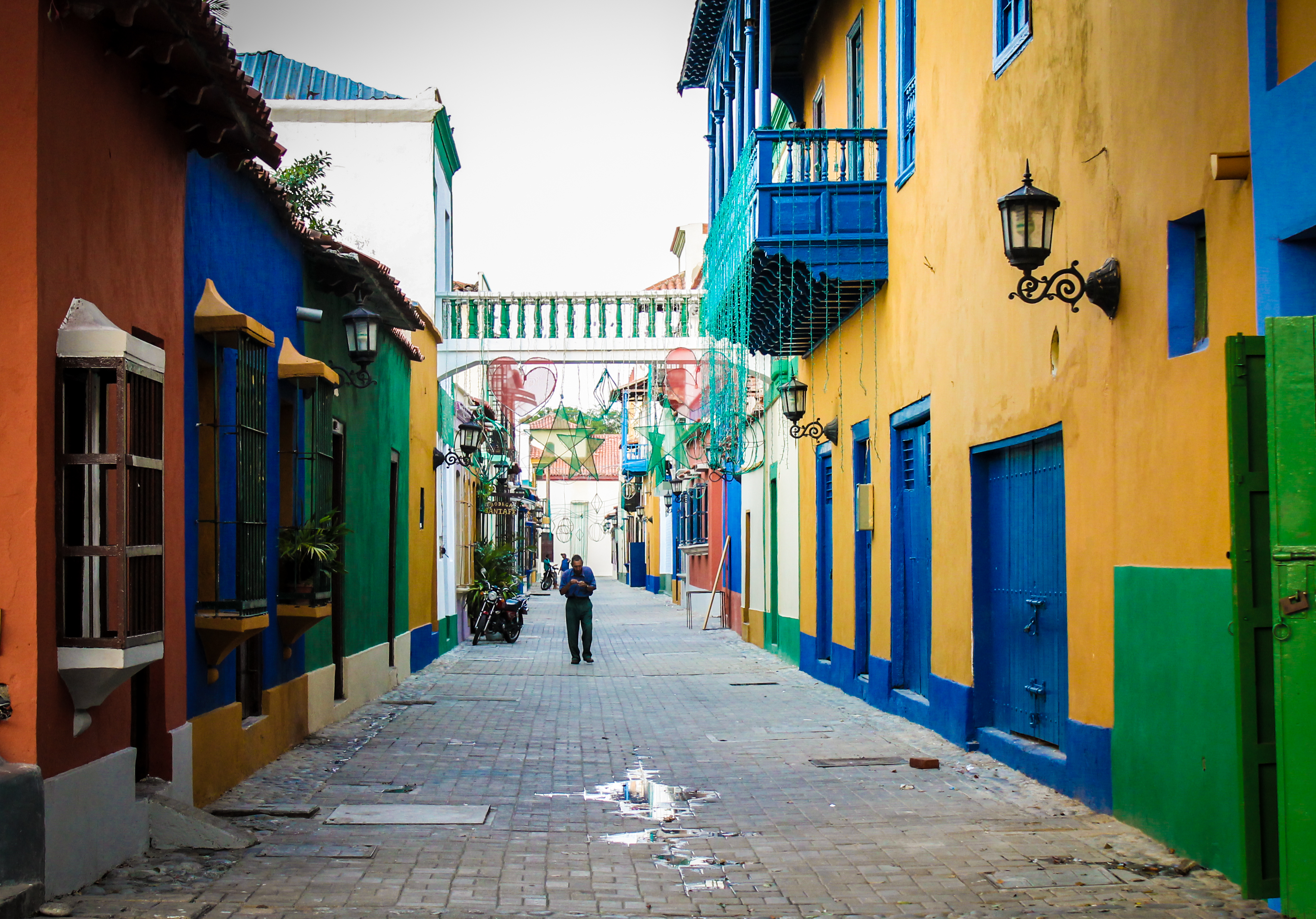
Casco Historico, Puerto Cabello

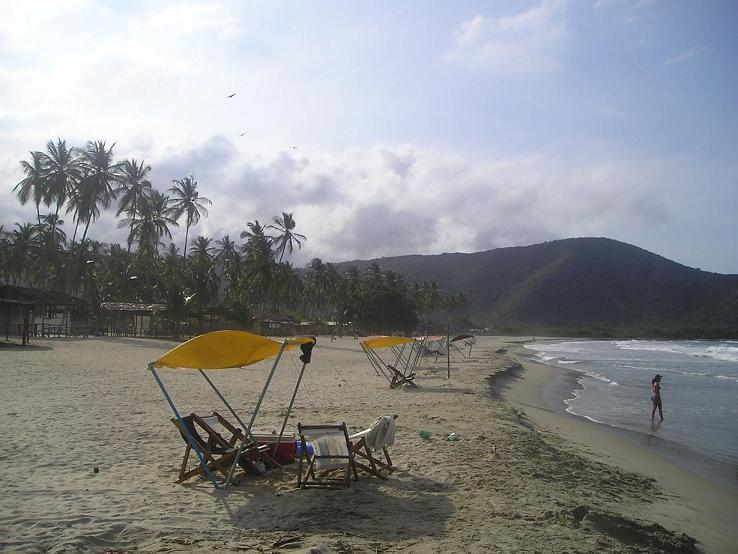
Bahía de Patanemo

=== Attractions ===
- Protestants Graveyard.
- Solano Fortress (part of the San Esteban National Park)
- San Felipe Castle.
- Long Island.
- Puente de Los Españoles (San Esteban Pueblo).
- Teatro Municipal

== Notable people ==
- Jose Altuve, Major League Baseball player for the Houston Astros
- William Contreras, Major League Baseball player for the Milwaukee Brewers
- Willson Contreras, Major League Baseball player for the Boston Red Sox
- Félix Doubront, baseball player, who is currently a free agent
- Juan José Flores, military general, 1st, 3rd, and 4th President of Ecuador
- Víctor Moreno, former Major League Baseball player
- Fernando Nieve, former Major League Baseball player
- Bartolomé Salom, military hero of the Venezuelan War of Independence
- Pablo Sandoval, Atlantic League player for the Staten Island FerryHawks
- Ender Thomas, singer, guitarist
- Jorbit Vivas, Major League Baseball player for the Washington Nationals
- Carlos Zambrano, former Major League Baseball player

== Transport ==
Puerto Cabello is served by a station on the Instituto de Ferrocarriles del Estado network.

== Economy ==
Puerto Cabello is Venezuela’s largest seaport, however, port traffic declined after the price of oil collapsed; this devastated the country as it was heavily reliant on imports paid for with oil revenues. As a result of the Venezuelan crisis, many of the poorer citizens in Puerto Cabello's "shantytowns" struggle with severe food insecurity. Citizens wait in long lines to buy groceries with government-mandated prices, and the bolívar had depreciated by nearly 64% as of May, 2017. By August 2017, the depreciation had reached as much as 94%. The UCOCAR shipyards are in Puerto Cabello and have been awarded contracts to construct patrol vessels for the Venezuelan Navy.

== See also ==
- List of cities in Venezuela
- Railway stations in Venezuela
