= José María Vargas =

Venezelan politician (1786–1854)

Jose María Vargas
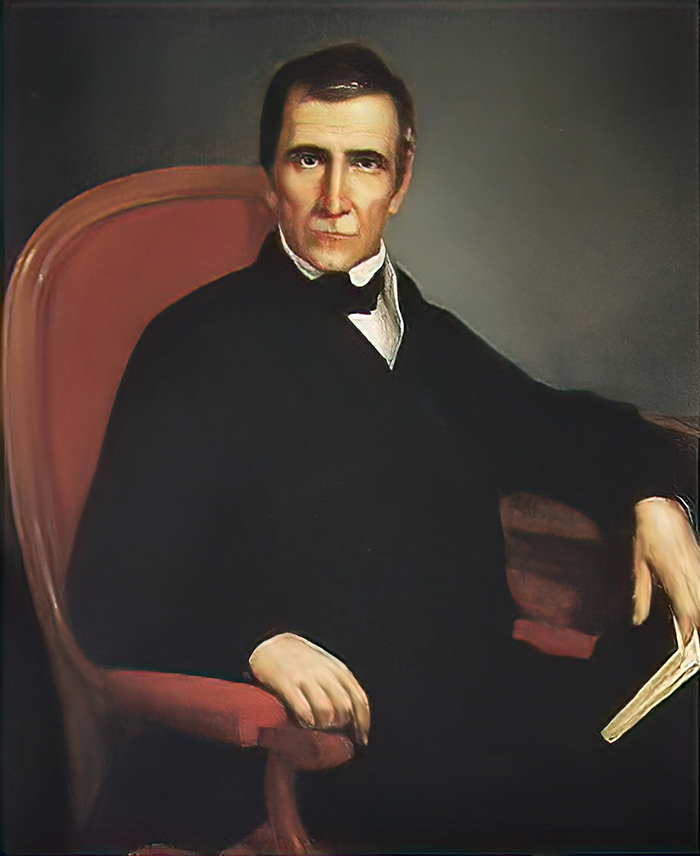

6th President of Venezuela
- In office 9 February 1835 – 9 July 1835
- Preceded by: Andrés Narvarte
- Succeeded by: José María Carreño
- In office 20 August 1835 – 24 April 1836
- Preceded by: José María Carreño
- Succeeded by: Andrés Narvarte

Personal details
- Born: 10 March 1786 La Guaira, Captaincy General of Venezuela, Spanish Empire
- Died: 13 July 1854 (aged 68) New York City, United States
- Spouse: Encarnación Maitín

José María Vargas Ponce (10 March 1786 – 13 April 1854) was the president of Venezuela from 1835 to 1836. He was elected in the 1834 Venezuelan presidential election, the first free and fair elections in South America. He defeated the candidate supported by the incumbent president. Vargas was Venezuela's first civilian president.

He was overthrown in 1835, returned to office, and resigned in 1836 amid pressure.

He graduated with a degree in philosophy from the Seminario Tridentino, and obtained in 1809 his medical degree from the Real y Pontificia Universidad de Caracas. Vargas was imprisoned in 1813 for revolutionary activities. Upon his release in 1813, he travelled to United Kingdom for medical training. Vargas performed cataract surgery. He was one of the earliest oculists (eye surgeons) in Puerto Rico after his arrival there in 1817. He returned to Venezuela to practice medicine and surgery in 1825.

== Presidency ==
The presidency of José María Vargas was initiated through indirect elections and appointment by the Congress, succeeding José Antonio Páez's first administration in 1835. As the second constitutional government of Venezuela following the country's separation from Gran Colombia, Vargas's presidency was constitutionally mandated to last until 1839 but remained uncompleted.

== Personal life ==
José María Vargas was married to Encarnación Maitín, who served as First Lady of Venezuela from 1835 to 1836. In 1877, his ashes were brought to Caracas and buried in the National Pantheon on 27 April of that same year.

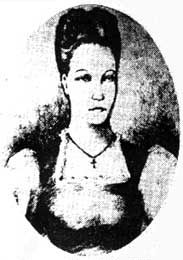
Encarnación Maitín in 1827

== Honors ==
The Venezuelan state of Vargas was named after him until 2019.

== See also ==
- Revolution of the Reforms

Political offices
Preceded by Andrés Narvarte	President of Venezuela; 9 February 1835 – 9 July 1835	Succeeded by José María Carreño
Preceded by José María Carreño	President of Venezuela; 20 August 1835 – 24 April 1836	Succeeded by Andrés Narvarte
Academic offices
Preceded by José Cecilio Avila	Rector of the Central University of Venezuela; 1827-1829	Succeeded by José Nicolás Díaz
