= Guzmanato =

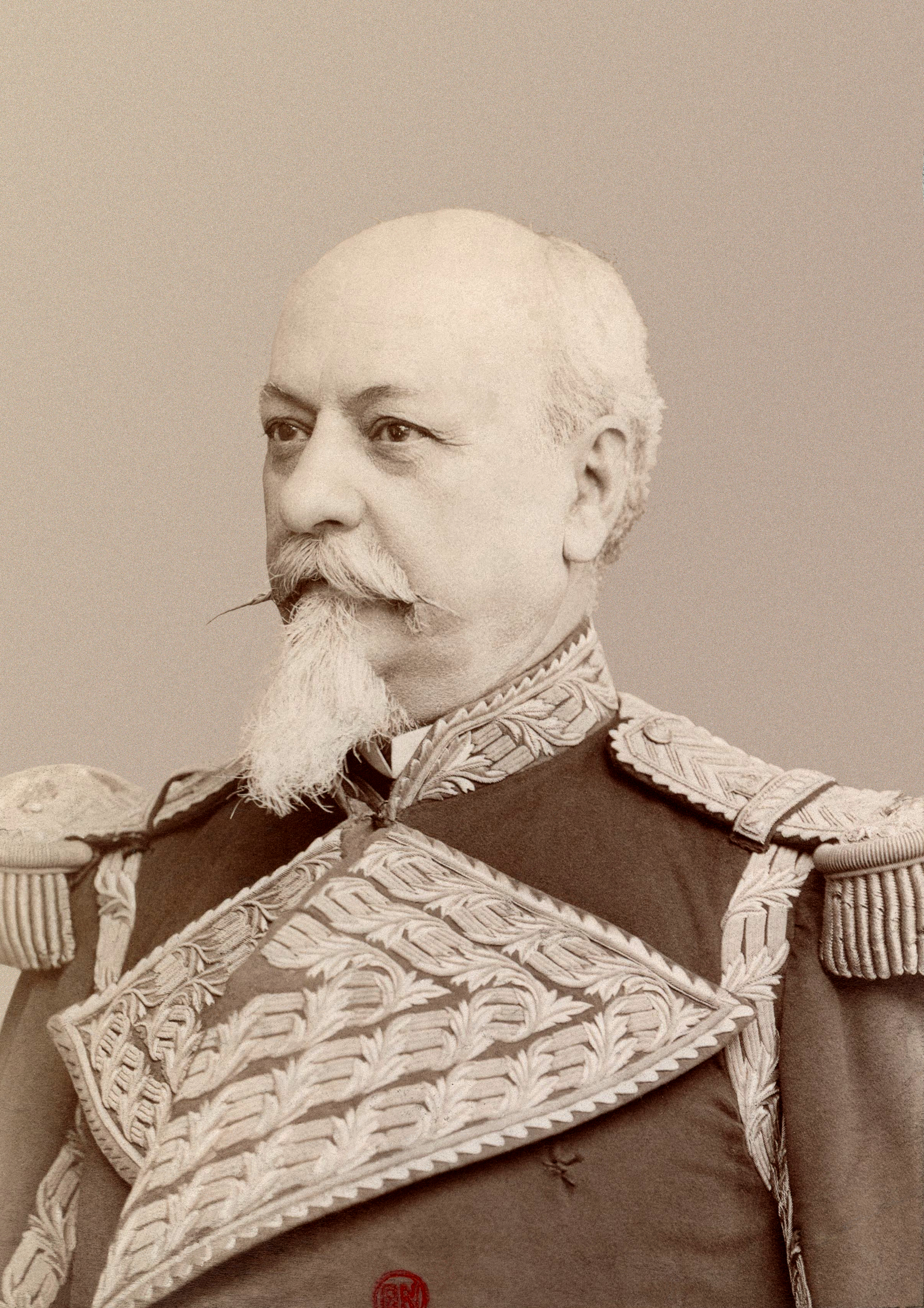
Antonio Guzmán Blanco

The Guzmanato is the name given to the set of autocratic governments of the dictator Antonio Guzmán Blanco in Venezuela after he seized power during the April Revolution of 1870. Although it is considered to have lasted eighteen years, his direct governments total nearly fourteen years and are known as the Septennium, the Quinquennium, and the Biennium, forming part of the historical period known as Liberalismo Amarillo. Guzmán maintained a strong influence during the biennium of Francisco Linares Alcántara (1877–1879), the biennium of Joaquín Crespo (1884–1886), and the interim government of Hermógenes López (1887–1888).

Guzmán's legislative policy included two constitutions: those of 1874 and 1881, through which he reduced the number of states from 20 to 9. His government was characterized by centralism and nationalism.

His economic policy introduced the bolívar de plata as the national currency in 1879, and after years of civil wars, the country achieved greater economic stabilization.

Guzmán's infrastructure policy encompassed numerous public buildings, especially during the Septennium, such as the Palacio Federal Legislativo and the Southern General Cemetery in Caracas, while railway construction was developed during the Quinquennium and the Biennium.

His education policy included the creation of the Ministry of Public Instruction and the establishment of basic education as a right, making it compulsory, as well as the expropriation of the Central University of Venezuela (UCV).

His cultural policy included the establishment of civil marriage in 1873, the declaration of "Gloria al Bravo Pueblo" as the national anthem of Venezuela in 1881, the installation of the Academia Venezolana de la Lengua, and a confrontation with the Catholic Church.

Guzmán's foreign policy saw the rupture of diplomatic relations with the Kingdoms of Spain and the Netherlands, as well as with the British Empire (1887), after the English Crown decreed the Venezuelan territories of El Callao, Guasipati, and El Dorado as its own.

The Guzmanato was a period of intense political repression, with numerous political prisoners and no freedom of the press. The style of government was personalistic: Guzmán gave his own name ("Guzmán" and "Guzmán Blanco") to two Venezuelan states.

== Background ==
Antonio Guzmán Blanco had served as Minister of Finance and Foreign Affairs in the cabinet of Juan Crisóstomo Falcón.

In 1870, Antonio Guzmán Blanco led the April Revolution against José Ruperto Monagas, finally seizing power on April 27, 1870.

== Cabinet ==
Guzmán's first cabinet included Diego Bautista Urbaneja as Minister of Interior and Justice, José Ignacio Pulido as Minister of War and Navy, his father Antonio Leocadio Guzmán as Minister of Foreign Affairs, Jacinto Gutiérrez as Minister of Finance, Francisco Pimentel y Roth as Minister of Public Credit, and Martín J. Sanabria as Minister of Development. In 1873, Martín J. Sanabria was appointed Minister of Interior. In 1879, Diego Bautista Urbaneja returned as Minister of Interior.

== Domestic policy ==
Guzmán governed in three distinct periods: the Septennium (1870–1877), the Quinquennium (1879–1884), and the Biennium (1886–1887).

=== Legislative policy ===
Guzmán ordered the construction of the Federal Legislative Palace to serve as the seat of Congress, with its first stage completed by 1873. During the Septennium, the "revalidation of the 1864 Federal Constitution" was proposed, which culminated in the 1874 constitution, transforming secret voting into public voting and reducing the presidential term from four to two years.

Upon his return to power during the Quinquennium, Guzmán served as Supreme Director of National Reclamation in 1879, a title later changed to provisional president. In 1881, a new constitution was promoted, which eliminated direct voting to elect the president, prevented his immediate reelection, introduced the Grand Federal Council (which earned it the nickname "Swiss constitution"), and reduced the number of states from 20 to 9. Later that year, Zulia and Falcón states were unified into the Great State of Falcón.

=== Defense ===
In 1873, the Military Code was approved, replacing the old provisions on the subject. The code stated that all men between the ages of 18 and 60 should be available to serve in the Armed Forces and Navy. The federal executive had the power to decide the number of citizens called to service, while for the national militia, the respective authorities in each state could do so.

Service time was set at four years, although service was only considered completed once a sufficient number of men had been recruited to replace those who had completed their time. The code also mentioned that recruitment of those prosecuted for military causes should be avoided and included a four-year prison sentence for deserters and those who collaborated with them. Additionally, the use of corporal punishment on soldiers was established, including the gag, the three-cord whip, the stocks, the lash, among others.

In 1882, a reform of the Military Code reduced the service period by two years and gave Congress the power to decide the number of enlistees based on census data. It also mentioned those who would be exempt from service, including public employees, clergy, married men, doctors, teachers, students, etc. Workers and laborers engaged in railway construction were added to the list.

=== Economics ===
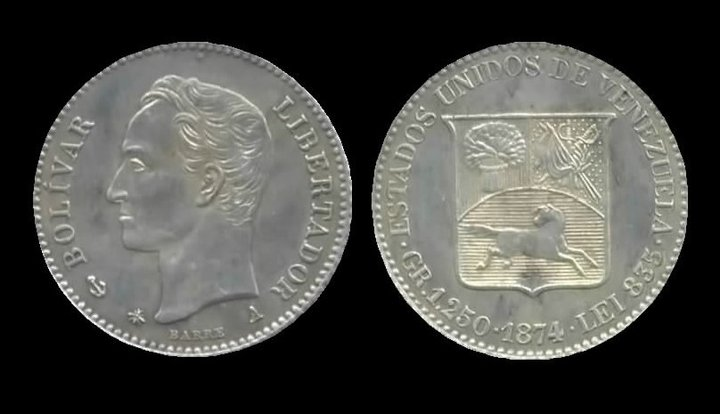
Venezuelan venezolano

During the Septennium, the government dedicated itself to organizing public finances. It was a period of economic prosperity.

During the Quinquennium, in 1879, the silver bolívar was put into circulation as legal tender. In 1883, President Guzmán granted the corsair Antonio Liccioni 379 leagues and 921 hectares, equivalent to almost all of the south of present-day Bolívar state, for a sum of 600,000 bolívars, with a two-year grace period and 6% interest. During the Quinquennium, a national economic crisis occurred due to falling coffee prices and a devastating locust plague that destroyed crops.

Guzmán adapted the national economy in favor of free trade and the needs of the emerging markets of the time. The economy remained a system of monoculture and latifundia. Historian Nikíta Harwich Vallenilla wrote that during the Guzmanato, foreign capital investment was the main strategy for Venezuela's development. These investments were directed toward consolidating foreign economic monopolies, a production system that was not competitive for the nation in international markets.

The Credit Mercantile Company of Caracas was also created.

=== Education ===
The Decree of Compulsory Public Instruction was issued on June 27, 1870, by Antonio Guzmán Blanco with the aim of promoting basic education in Venezuela, though it could not be fully implemented.

The Central University of Venezuela (UCV) was reorganized. The University of Mérida (ULA) was stripped of its former headquarters in 1875 for being located in a seminary, and after recovering it during the biennium of Francisco Linares Alcántara, on September 24, 1883, it was renamed the "University of the Andes" and was ordered to sell all its assets, causing the university to fall into ruin and remain at the mercy of the state budget.

=== Infrastructure and Transportation ===
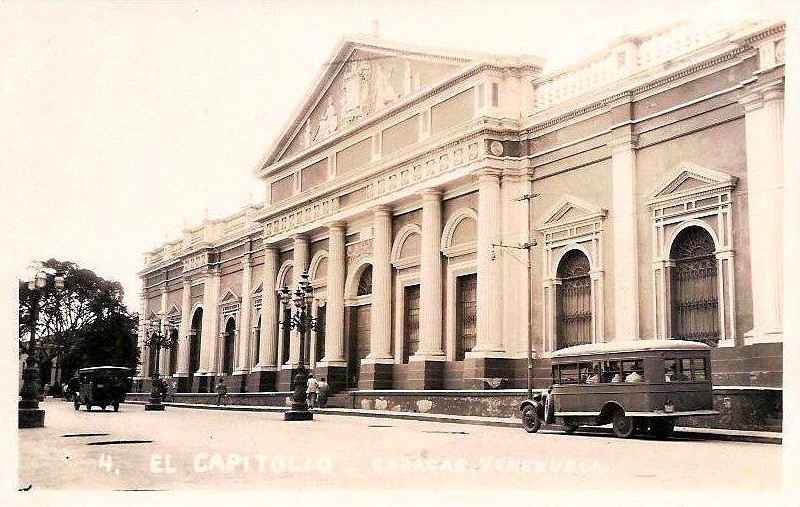
During the Guzmanato, the Palacio Federal Legislativo was built, still the seat of parliament

During the Guzmanato, the Ministry of Public Works was created. Infrastructure construction was pursued through external debt, leading to debts that could not be paid during Guzmán's time.

The image of Caracas was remodeled with parks and public buildings, and the city was modernized with telephone service during the Quinquennium. The construction of the Federal Legislative Palace was ordered, completed in its first stage by 1873. Cemeteries were secularized; in 1876, the Southern General Cemetery was inaugurated. Trinity Church was reformed to become the National Pantheon in 1875–1876, where Simón Bolívar's remains would be placed. The Caracas–Valles del Tuy highway, El Calvario aqueduct, Guzmán Blanco Theater, and Masonic Temple were all built. During the Quinquennium, the Caracas–La Guaira railway and Carabobo Park were inaugurated.

Guzmán also inaugurated statues of himself in Caracas during the Septennium; some of these were destroyed by agreement of the 1878 National Constituent Assembly and reinstalled after Guzmán's return during the Quinquennium.

=== Social and cultural policy ===
During the Septennium, there were political conflicts with the Catholic Church; convents and seminaries were dissolved and their assets were expropriated on September 21, 1872; in 1873, civil marriage was established as the only valid one.

The 1881 constitution declared "Gloria al Bravo Pueblo", attributed to Vicente Salias and Juan José Landaeta, as the national anthem of Venezuela.

=== Media policy ===
During the Guzmanato, censorship was applied. The official newspaper La Opinión Nacional was tasked with flattering the dictator and preventing the publication of negative information about his regime. According to an account by physician Carl Sachs, a citizen once wanted to publish a critical article about the government in the newspaper, but it was rejected. The writer, who knew Antonio Guzmán Blanco, asked if he could publish his article, and Guzmán replied: "Certainly, mon cher; the article can be printed, but immediately you will go to prison."

== Foreign policy ==
Diplomatic relations were interrupted three times with the Netherlands: in 1870–1872, 1875, and 1880, as well as with France, the United States, Colombia, and the British Empire. Venezuela broke diplomatic relations with the latter in 1887, after the English Crown decreed for itself the Venezuelan territories of El Callao, Guasipati, and El Dorado.

The government of Guzmán and that of Colombia asked the Kingdom of Spain for an arbitral award regarding the border between the two countries in 1881, changing Venezuela's foreign policy from 1830 until then, which had prevented the sovereignty of that territory from being left at the mercy of third parties. In 1881, the Venezuelan Congress protested against the Chilean occupation of Peru and Bolivia.

== Ideology ==
=== Nationalism ===
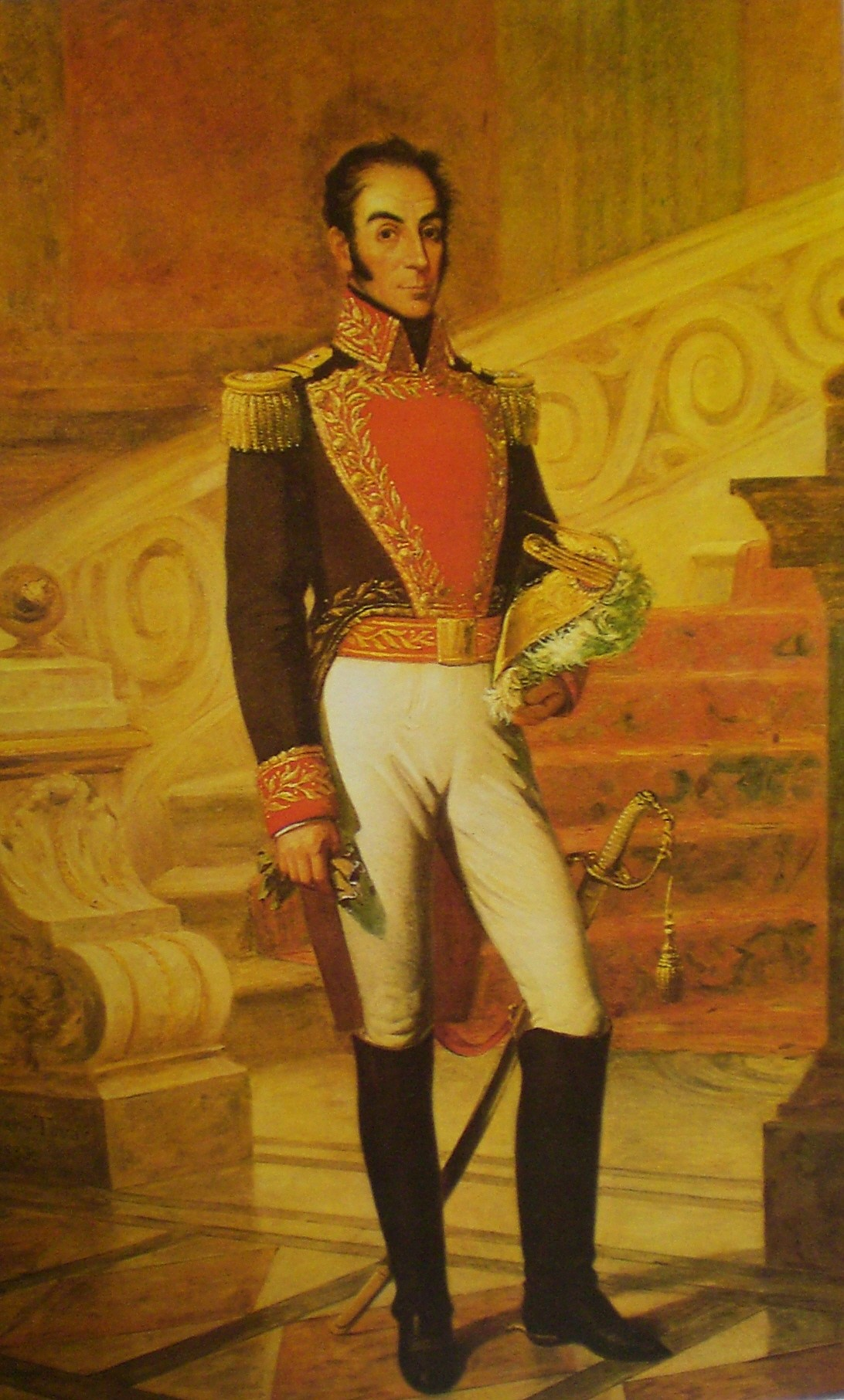
Painting of Simón Bolívar, made by Martín Tovar y Tovar on commission from Antonio Guzmán Blanco.

Guzmán sought to symbolically unify the republic. Painter Martín Tovar y Tovar was commissioned to paint great battles of Venezuelan history and a gallery of portraits of the heroes of independence.

During his confrontation with the Catholic Church, Guzmán Blanco threatened to create a Venezuelan National Church independent of the Holy See, but this was never carried out.

=== Positivism ===
Guzmán's government had a positivist vision.

=== Cult of personality of Simón Bolívar ===
Guzmán Blanco was one of the main architects of the cult of personality of Simón Bolívar, using his figure to legitimize his authoritarian government. On October 28, 1872, during the peace celebrations, Bolívar's belongings were displayed. Two years later, on November 7, 1874, the equestrian statue of the Liberator was inaugurated in Caracas, where Guzmán Blanco proclaimed that Bolívar was "the greatest man that humanity had produced since Jesus Christ." In 1883, he celebrated the centenary of Bolívar's birth, transformed the Trinity Church into the National Pantheon to house Bolívar's remains, and on that occasion defined him as the "demigod of South America."

During this period, both the Liberal and Conservative parties sought to appropriate Bolívar's figure and ideas for their political ends, and his image was used as the basis for national unity.

=== Freemasonry ===
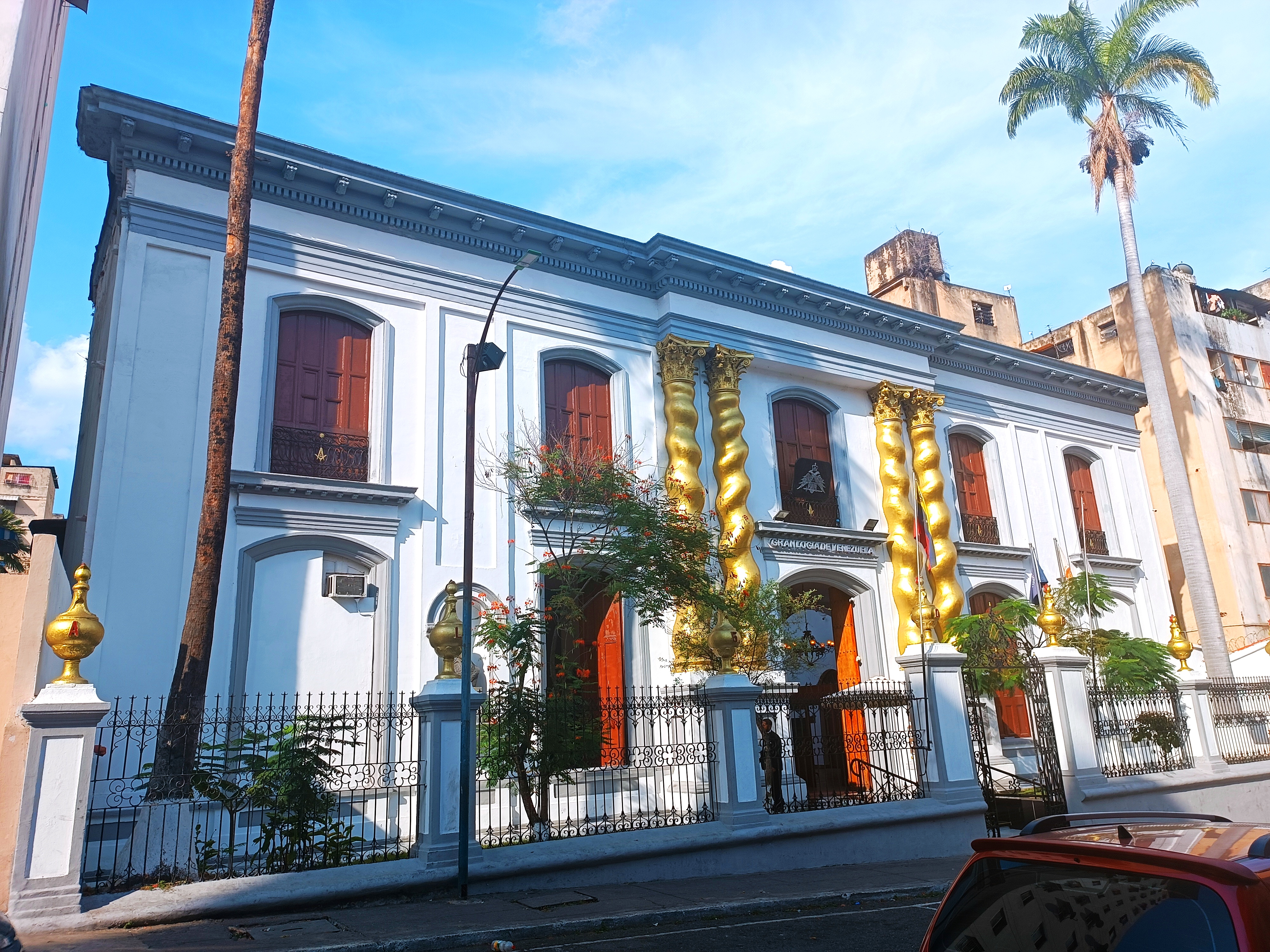
Masonic Temple of Caracas

Antonio Guzmán Blanco promoted Freemasonry; the Masonic Temple was built.

== Opposition ==
=== Political opposition ===
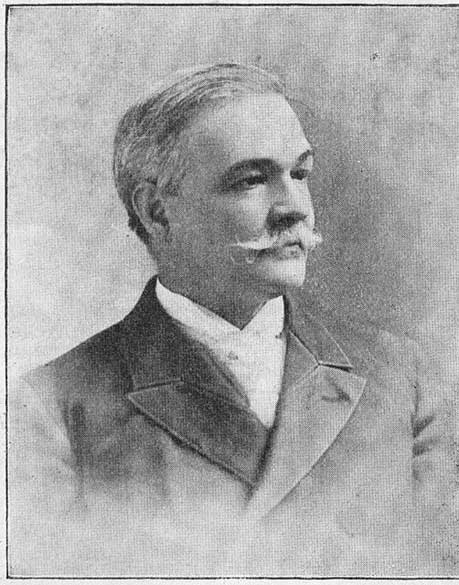
Nicanor Bolet Peraza

During the Septennium, Nicanor Bolet Peraza was one of the prominent anti-Guzmán figures. Following Guzmán's return to power during the Quinquennium, Eusebio Baptista, President of the Senate, opposed Antonio Guzmán Blanco in Congress during the debate on the constitutional reform that sought to reduce the 20 states of the Republic to 9 (1880). Baptista called the proposal "monstrous" and a "Swiss Constitution," which angered Guzmán Blanco. Due to a personal altercation that occurred at the San Francisco corner in Caracas on April 5, 1881, Antonio Guzmán Blanco requested Baptista's prosecution before the Senate under the pretext that Baptista had disrespected him. The Senate, submissive to Guzmán's will, agreed to lift his parliamentary immunity. Baptista was arrested and imprisoned until August 14, when he was released under the promise to withdraw from politics.

=== Ecclesiastical opposition ===
Guzmán Blanco exiled the Bishop of Mérida, Juan Hilario Bosset del Castillo, following his disagreement with the establishment of civil marriage.

== See also ==
- Gobierno de los Azules
- Presidency of Francisco Linares Alcántara
- First presidency of Joaquín Crespo

== Sources ==
- Barros van Buren, Manuel (1958). Historia Diplomática de Chile (1541-1938) (in Spanish). Editorial Andrés Bello.
