= Gobierno de los Azules =

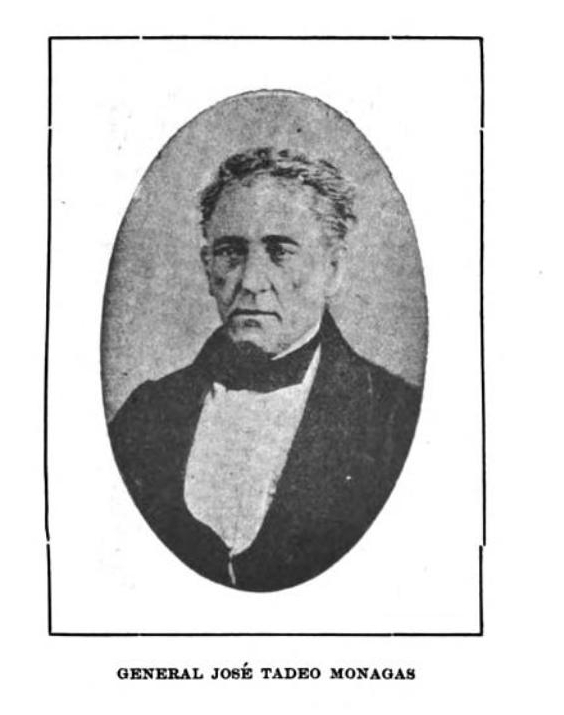
José Tadeo Monagas

Gobierno de los Azules is the term used to refer to the antidemocratic Venezuelan administrations installed following the Blue Revolution of 1868, composed of José Tadeo Monagas (who died in office), Guillermo Tell Villegas, and José Ruperto Monagas, son of José Tadeo. José Ruperto Monagas was overthrown by the April Revolution, led by Antonio Guzmán Blanco, thus beginning the dictatorship known as the Guzmanato.

== Background ==
José Tadeo Monagas, who had previously been a dictator in the country, led the Blue Revolution at the age of 84 with his family clan, as well as former Liberals and Conservatives.

== Cabinet ==
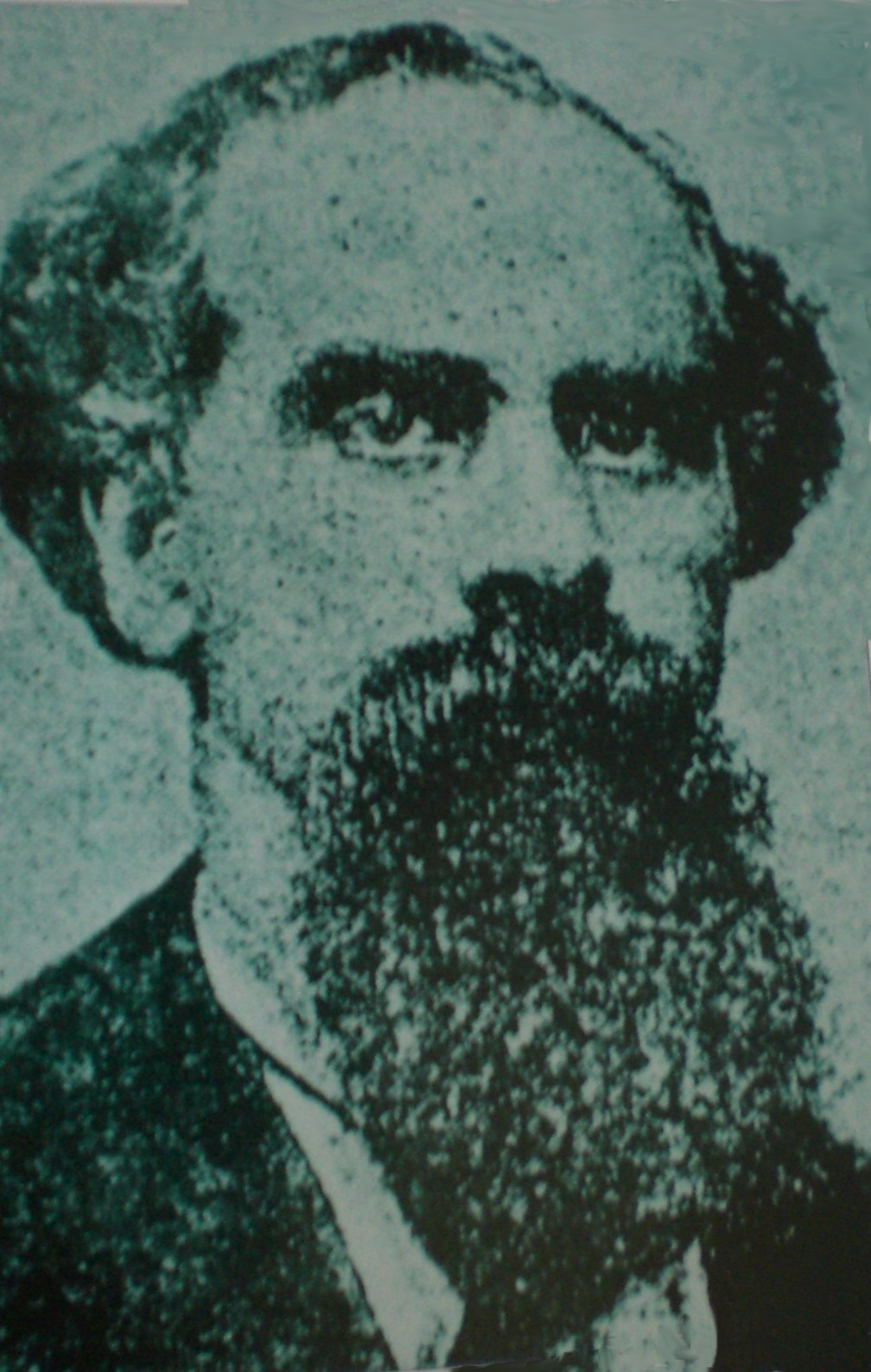
Guillermo Tell Villegas

José Tadeo Monagas assumed power in 1868 and governed until his death the same year.

Guillermo Tell Villegas assumed office in 1868; Juan Pablo Rojas Paúl served as his Minister of Foreign Affairs, and Mateo Guerra Marcano was Minister of Interior and Justice.

Finally, in 1869, José Ruperto Monagas assumed the presidency, governing until he was overthrown in 1870.

== Domestic policy ==
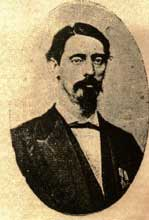
José Ruperto Monagas

=== Judicial policy ===
In 1869, the Lincheros were created, an armed group secretly organized by the government of José Ruperto Monagas to intimidate and persecute members of the opposition.

=== Legislative policy ===
The government decreed the reinstatement of the 1864 Constitution of the United States of Venezuela.

=== Infrastructure policy ===
On March 4, 1869, President Guillermo Tell Villegas decreed the erection of a statue of Simón Bolívar in the Bolívar Square.

== April Revolution ==
The April Revolution, also known as the Yellow Revolution, was a successful campaign initiated by Antonio Guzmán Blanco with former leaders of the Venezuelan Federal War (1859-1863), including his most adept followers, Joaquín Crespo and Francisco Linares Alcántara, to overthrow the Blue government of José Ruperto Monagas.

== See also ==
- Monagato
- Guzmanato
