= Presidency of Juan Crisóstomo Falcón =

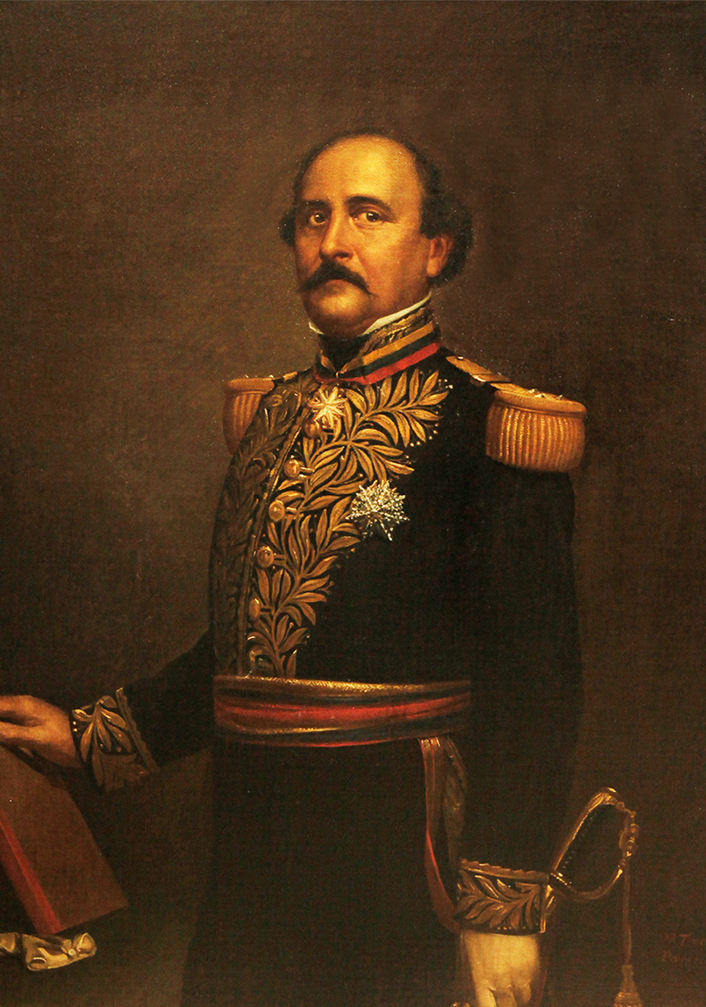
Juan Crisóstomo Falcón

The presidency of Juan Crisóstomo Falcón was elected by the National Assembly of La Victoria after winning the Federal War that had begun in 1859, succeeding the dictatorship of José Antonio Páez as the first government of the Liberal Party.

It began as an interim administration and, from an institutional standpoint, comprised three consecutive governments. At the legislative level, a National Constituent Assembly was convened, which ratified Falcón as president and approved the Constitution of 1864, changing the country's name from "State of Venezuela" to "United States of Venezuela." At the judicial level, the Federal High Court was designated as the republic's judicial branch. In economic terms, the management of the nation's coffers was disorganized and riddled with corruption in a context of aggravated economic crisis.

It was expected that at the end of his presidency, Falcón would reform the constitution and relaunch himself for the presidency, but this did not happen: despite being scheduled to complete its second constitutional term in 1869, Falcón resigned in 1868.

== Background ==
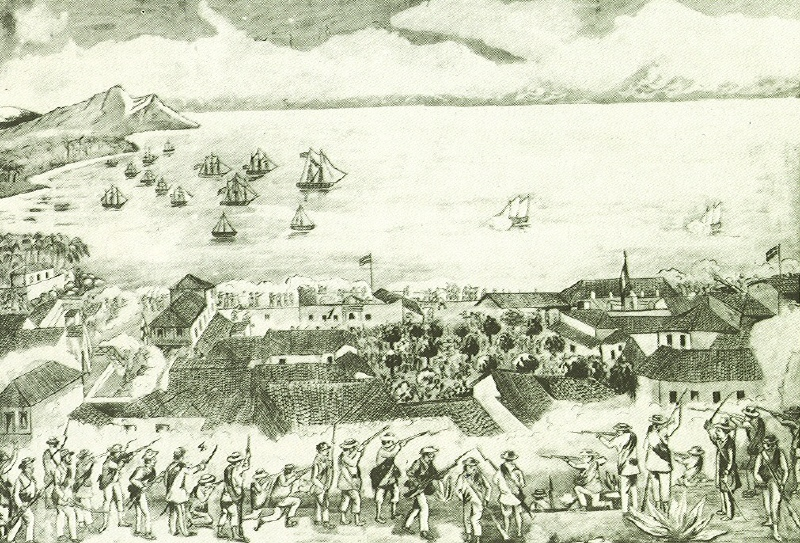
Federal War

The Federal War had culminated in a Liberal victory and the defeat of the Conservatives. José Antonio Páez ended up in exile in Argentina, marking, in the post-independence context, the second and last time Venezuela exiled the founder of its republic since Simón Bolívar. Juan Crisóstomo Falcón assumed power amid a climate of discord.

== Cabinet ==
Falcón's first cabinet was composed of Antonio Guzmán Blanco (who returned to the country in November 1863) as Minister of Finance and Foreign Affairs; Manuel Ezequiel Bruzual as Minister of War and Navy; Guillermo Iribarren as Minister of Development; and Mariano de Briceño as Minister of Interior.

== Domestic policy ==
It has been considered that, although he won the Federal War, Juan Crisóstomo Falcón was not prepared to exercise the presidency. Falcón did not enjoy being in Caracas; he often traveled to Coro, his home state.

=== Legislative policy ===
Flag of Venezuela

On July 29, 1863, a decree changed the national flag and coat of arms.

==== Decree of Guarantees ====
In 1863, the Decree of Guarantees was issued, which abolished the death penalty, confinement, and banishment, and called for elections for a National Constituent Assembly. The decree was to remain in effect until a new pact was reached among the Venezuelan states.

==== National Constituent Assembly ====
The decree gave Falcón popularity; he won the elections for the National Constituent Assembly, where he was conferred the title of Marshal, and achieved the stability needed to govern. The Constituent Assembly decreed the creation of the Federal District in February 1864, incorporating the territories of Caracas, Maiquetía, and La Guaira.

==== National Constitution of 1864 ====
The political climate became increasingly tense, with protests in various states of the country. In 1864, the new national constitution was promulgated, changing the country's name from "State of Venezuela" to "United States of Venezuela" under the argument that the union would now be federal and therefore a "states' union," adopting a decentralizing vision in which the states would have autonomy. The death penalty was abolished.

Regarding the constitution, President Falcón declared:

"It will be the first monument of liberty to rise in this opulent America, as noble as the heart of its children, as glorious as the destinies that await it..."

— Juan Crisóstomo Falcón

==== Civil Code ====
On May 21, 1867, the Venezuelan Civil Code was reformed.

=== Judicial policy ===
The Federal High Court was designated as the supreme judicial power by the National Constituent Assembly.

=== Defense ===
In 1869, journalist Antonio Leocadio Guzmán criticized the government of Juan Crisóstomo Falcón for the implementation of conscription. He denounced that, since Falcón's regime, men were "hunted through towns and fields with satanic fury."

=== Economics ===
1‑centavo coin of 1863

Venezuela was economically ruined by the Federal War at the beginning of Falcón's presidency. The fiscal management of his government has been considered disorganized and riddled with corruption; the Minister of Finance resigned because there was no money in the Treasury, and the following year, Congress was dissolved because there was no way to pay the deputies and senators.

=== Electoral policy ===
The new constitution maintained the electoral system of the 1858 Constitution, establishing a four-year presidential term with no immediate reelection, through direct and secret voting. On March 18, 1865, Congress conducted the electoral scrutiny, and Marshal Juan Crisóstomo Falcón was elected president; two designates were also elected to fill his absences: Antonio Guzmán Blanco and José Desiderio Trías.

=== Human Rights ===
On August 18, 1863, President Falcón signed a decree on citizen guarantees, which guaranteed civil and political rights.

=== Infrastructure ===
In 1866, the Puerto Cabello–El Palito railroad and the Buena Vista aqueduct in Coro were inaugurated.

=== Media policy ===
Press freedom was expanded during the government of Juan Crisóstomo Falcón.

=== Resignation of Falcón ===
Growing opposition to President Falcón in Congress led to his resignation in 1868, in which he declared:

"The time has come to fulfill my promise to the nation: to withdraw from power, leaving it master of its own fate."

— Juan Crisóstomo Falcón

== Ideology ==
The ideology promoted was federalism; however, after decades of a centralist model, society initially did not know how to apply it nor fully understand it.

== Opposition ==
=== Blue Revolution ===
Congress appointed Manuel Ezequiel Bruzual during the fighting to suppress the Blue Revolution, led by José Tadeo Monagas, after which Juan Crisóstomo Falcón withdrew from political life.

== See also ==
- Dictatorship of José Antonio Páez
- Gobierno de los Azules
