= Presidency of Francisco Linares Alcántara =

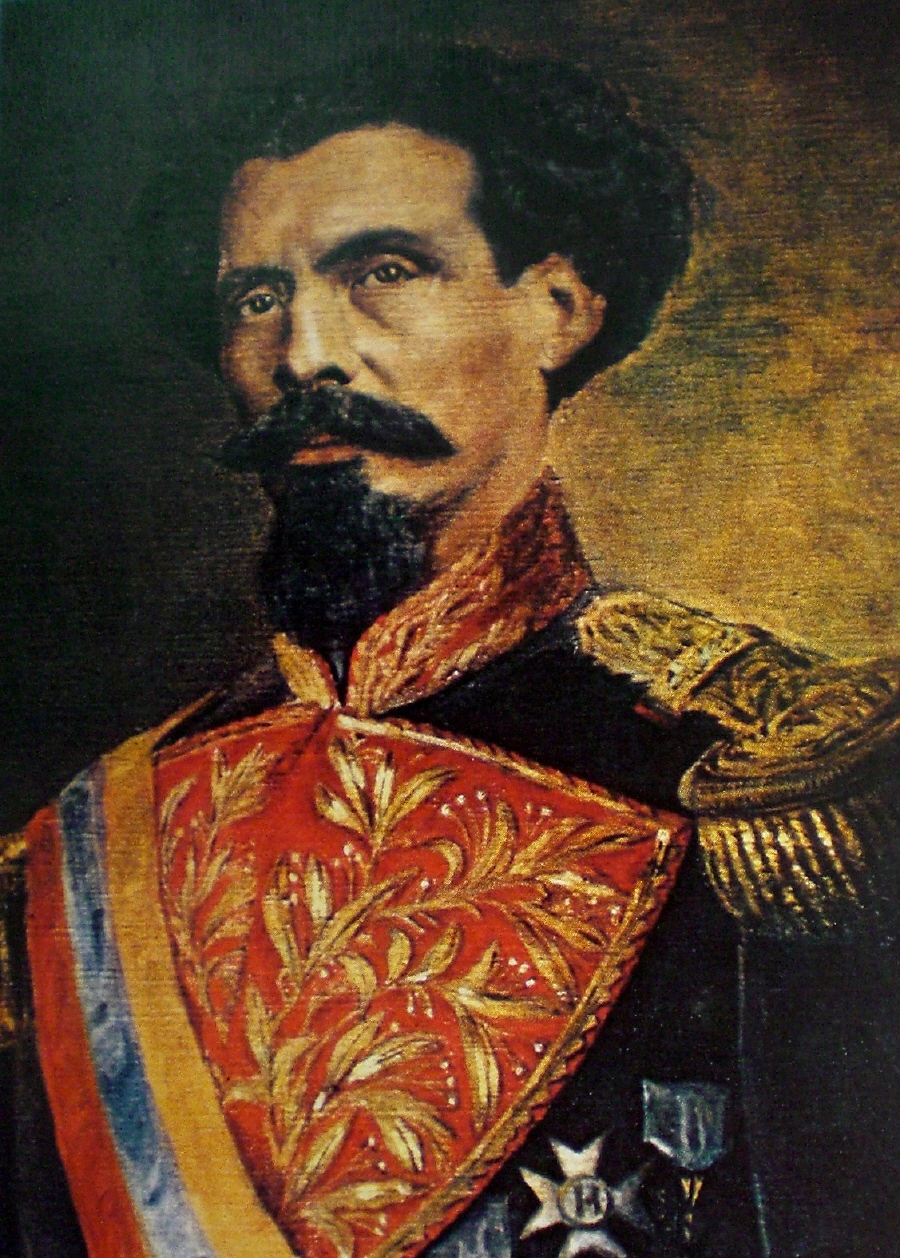
Francisco Linares Alcántara

The presidency of Francisco Linares Alcántara was a Liberal Party administration, scheduled for the 1877-1879 biennium. It followed the Guzmancista Septennium of Antonio Guzmán Blanco, who left the country during his rule. President Linares Alcántara died in office on November 30, 1878, an event that became the subject of conspiracy theories. He was succeeded by the president of the Federal High Court, General Jacinto Gutiérrez.

== Background ==
The dictator Antonio Guzmán Blanco invited his "twelve apostles" to run for the presidency of the republic. Francisco Linares Alcántara had gained his favor due to his connection with Ana Teresa Ibarra, Guzmán Blanco's wife.

== Domestic policy ==
=== Legislative policy ===
From the beginning of his two-year term, the president dedicated himself to a constitutional reform project aimed at extending his period in government. To this end, he established a network of alliances, declared the current constitution unusable on September 12, 1878, and called for elections for a constituent assembly in December of that year, which were not held due to his sudden death.

=== Social policy ===
In June 1877, President Francisco Linares Alcántara decreed a general amnesty. President Linares Alcántara decreed permission for all political exiles to return to Venezuela.

=== Education policy ===
The government reopened the Colegio de Ingenieros de Venezuela on November 15, 1877. It also returned to the University of the Andes (ULA) its former headquarters, of which it had been stripped during the government of Guzmán.

=== Cultural policy ===
The government organized the transfer of the remains of former president José María Vargas to the National Pantheon.

=== 1878 presidential re-election project ===
The government negotiated with León Colina and Raimundo Andueza Palacio to withdraw their candidacies. In the case of Andueza Palacio, he left Sebastián Casañas as his successor and went to live in France. José Ignacio Pulido was offered two ministerial portfolios and the purchase of his military arsenal for one hundred thousand pesos.

== Death and funeral ==
President Francisco Linares Alcántara fell ill in November 1878 and died on the 30th. His funeral was held at the Government Palace, the Casa Amarilla, and he was later transferred to the National Pantheon, where his burial ceremony included an incident resulting in two deaths and several injuries.

== Opposition ==
José Ignacio Pulido rose up in Bolívar state, Jesús Zamora in Barcelona, and Paredes y Montañez rebelled in Carabobo; all were defeated by Linares Alcántara's forces.

== See also ==
- Guzmanato
