= Revindicating Revolution =

Revolution in Venezuela

- Part of the Venezuelan civil wars
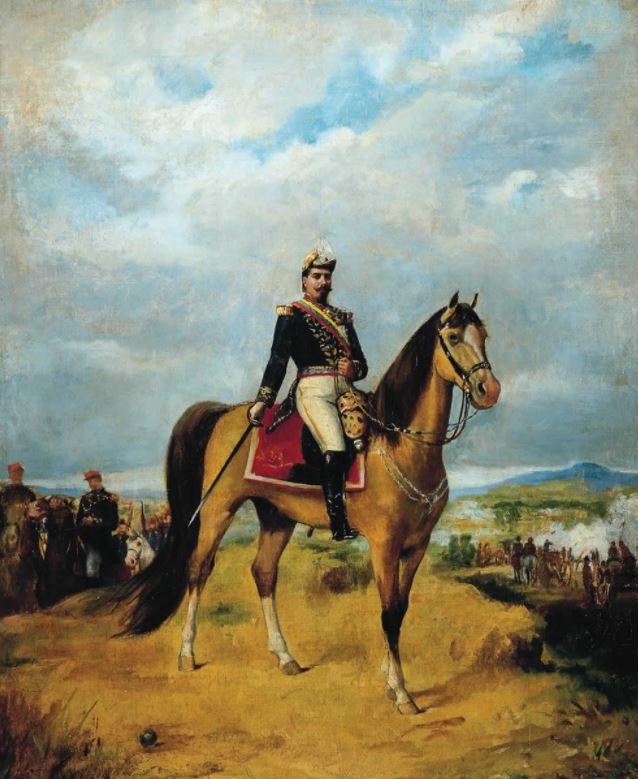
- General Joaquín Crespo after the battle of La Victoria in 1879.
Date	29 December 1878 – 13 February 1879
Location	Venezuela
Result	Revindicating victory. Guzmán Blanco returns to the presidency.

Belligerents
Restoration Army loyal to Antonio Guzmán Blanco	Government of the United States of Venezuela

Commanders and leaders
José Gregorio Cedeño; Joaquín Crespo	Francisco Linares Alcántara; José Gregorio Valera

The Revindicating Revolution was a civil war in Venezuela between supporters and opponents of Antonio Guzmán Blanco, fought between December 1878 and February 1879.

== Origin ==
The government of President Francisco Linares Alcántara (February 1877 - November 1878) had been characterized by strong anti-Guzmancism, toppling statues of his predecessor Guzmán Blanco and persecuting his supporters. When Linares Alcántara died unexpectedly from a bronchial condition in November 1878, the Constituent Assembly elected Linares Alcántara supporter José Gregorio Valera as President of the Republic.

== Actions ==
José Gregorio Cedeño was appointed vice president, a position he refused to accept, proclaiming on 29 December 1878 the autonomy of the Carabobo state and ignoring the Valera government. The rebels recognized former President General Antonio Guzmán Blanco, who was in exile in Paris, as their supreme leader.

Cedeño, head of the Revindicator troops, led the campaign during January 1879. José Gregorio Valera tried to quell the rebellion, but was defeated in the battle of La Victoria on 6 February 1879, in which a total of 2,000 soldiers were killed or wounded. On 13 February, the Revindicator Army entered Caracas and Guzmán Blanco returned to power.

== Bibliography ==
- Rondón Márquez, Rafael Ángel (1952). Guzmán Blanco, el autócrata civilizador. Madrid: Imprenta García Vicente.
- Guzmán Blanco, Antonio (1879). La Reivindicación. Documentos del General Guzmán Blanco. Caracas: Imprenta de la Gaceta Oficial.
