= 1892 in Venezuela =

- Centuries: 18th; 19th; 20th; 21st
- Decades: 1870s; 1880s; 1890s; 1900s; 1910s
- See also: Other events of 1892; Years in Venezuela; Timeline of Venezuelan history

Events in the year 1892 in Venezuela.

== Incumbents ==
- President: Raimundo Andueza Palacio until June 17, Guillermo Tell Villegas until August 31, Guillermo Tell Villegas Pulido until October 7, Joaquin Crespo

== Events ==
- September 17 - inauguration of new psychiatric hospital in Caracas
