= April Revolution (disambiguation) =

The April Revolution was the 1960 uprising in South Korea.

April Revolution may also refer to:

- April Revolution (Venezuela), Venezuelan civil war in 1870.
- 25 April Revolution, armed revolution, in Portugal, that overthrew the dictatorship
- April Uprising, insurrection organised by the Bulgarians in the Ottoman Empire from April to May 1876
- Dominican Civil War, which is also known as the April Revolution
- Saur Revolution, the April 1978 Communist revolution in Afghanistan
- The April protests of the 2006 democracy movement in Nepal
- The April 2010 Kyrgyzstani revolution
