= Blue Revolution (Venezuela) =

Revolution in Venezuela

- Part of the Venezuelan civil wars
Date	1867–1868
Location	Venezuela
Result	Rebel victory, government of the Blues established

Belligerents
Liberal government	Blue rebels

Commanders and leaders
Juan Crisóstomo Falcón; Manuel Ezequiel Bruzual	José Tadeo Monagas

Strength
4000 soldiers and 2000 "generals" (1868)	3000 at Puerto Cabello (1868)

The Blue Revolution or Revolución Reconquistadora ("Reconquering Revolution") or Los Azules ("The Blues") was an armed insurrection in 1867 and 1868, in the context of the Venezuelan civil wars that took place during the nineteenth century. Through this rebellion, various political and regional groups overthrew President Manuel Ezequiel Bruzual, interim successor of the Marshal Juan Crisóstomo Falcón who had resigned after pressure. These military actions were the conclusion of the long political conflict that confronted various liberal factions and the Falcón government.

== Background ==
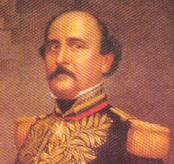
Juan Crisóstomo Falcón

The causes of the revolution can be traced back to 1864, a year after the liberal victory in the Federal War and the rise to power of Falcón, who had to face strong dissidence from his own movement, which began to arm itself after the public resignation of the Minister of War and Navy Manuel Ezequiel Bruzual. For more than three years it gathered political and military leaders within its ranks, many of them highly favored by the government. The first uprisings, which took place on a regional level, were quickly repressed by the government. The central army numbered just 3,000 regulars in 1866, not enough to defeat the forces of the regional caudillos.

However, due to the increasingly repressive central administration, insurgent groups began to spread throughout the country in 1867, mainly after the imprisonment of General Manuel Ezequiel Bruzual. This led to a "Blue" alliance between liberals and conservatives to gain strength as an opposition. In September of that year, a committee of liberals and conservatives was formed in Caracas whose main objective was to overthrow the government. Among its leading members were figures such as Generals Luciano Mendoza and Pedro Ezequiel Rojas, as well as Guillermo Tell Villegas, Elías Rodríguez, Martín J. Sanabria, and José Antonio Mosquera.

== Siege of Puerto Cabello ==
President Bruzual, unable to defend Caracas, fled with 300 men to Puerto Cabello, where he sought to continue the conflict. There he proclaimed himself still in control of the Presidency of the Republic and enlisted troops to face the army sent from Caracas. At the head of the Blue army, José Ruperto Monagas began the siege of the city on 6 August 1868 and, on the 12th, Bruzual was wounded by a sniper.
Defeated, he managed to flee to Curaçao where he died of gangrene on 14 August. In Willemstad, Falcón had him buried in a common grave without honors, accompanied by just one Mason brother. In 1876 General Antonio Guzmán Blanco ordered the transfer of Bruzuals remains to Venezuela to be buried in the National Pantheon, appointing a commission chaired by his relative Blas Bruzual.

On 28 June 1868, Guillermo Tell Villegas of the victorious Blue movement had been appointed as new President of Venezuela.

== See also ==
- Federal War
- History of Venezuela
- Caudillismo

== Bibliography ==
- Domingo Irwin G. & Ingrid Micett (2008). Caudillos, Militares y Poder: Una Historia Del Pretorianismo en Venezuela. Caracas: Universidad Católica Andrés Bello. ISBN 978-980244-561-5.
