= Guillermo Tell Villegas Pulido =

Venezuelan lawyer, writer and politician

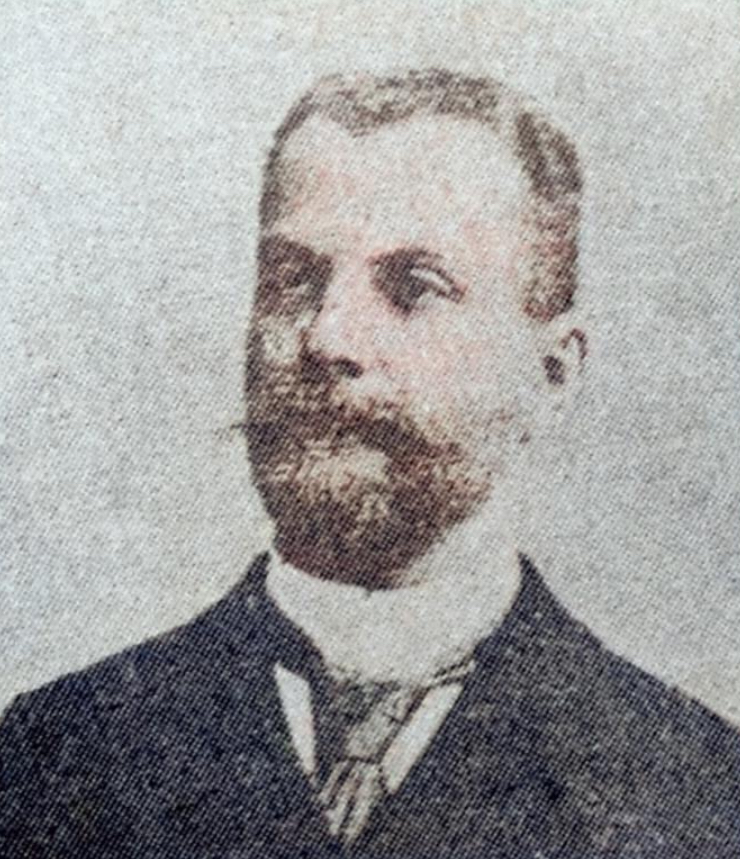

President of Venezuela Interim
- In office 31 August 1892 – 7 October 1892
- Preceded by: Guillermo Tell Villegas
- Succeeded by: Joaquín Crespo

Personal details
- Born: 28 July 1854 Barinas, Province of Barinas, State of Venezuela
- Died: 25 July 1949 (aged 94) Caracas, Federal District, United States of Venezuela
- Party: Liberal Party
- Education: Central University of Venezuela

Guillermo Tell Villegas Pulido (28 July 1854 – 25 July 1949), was a Venezuelan lawyer, writer, journalist, and politician who served as acting president of Venezuela. A lawyer early in his career, in 1876 he cofounded the school La Paz in Caracas. Also dedicated to journalism, he founded the publications Alianza Literaria in 1876, La Mayoría in 1879, and Monitor in 1889. Between 1879 and 1892 he held various political roles including Secretary of Interior of the Federal District, secretary general in the government of President Antonio Guzmán Blanco, and a trial judge in Caracas.

Villegas Pulido served as deputy for the state of Bolívar from 1890 until 1892. Following the resignation of president Guillermo Tell Villegas during the crisis of the Legalist Revolution, Villegas Pulido was selected by the Federal Council as the provisional president of Venezuela in August 1892. During his short tenure, he helped establish the Psychiatric Hospital of Caracas. After Joaquín Crespo established himself as president by force in October 1892, Villegas Pulido left the country. Returning to Venezuela in 1898, until 1904 he headed three state governments, starting with Falcón and followed by Guárico and Apure.

He first served as Attorney General of Venezuela from 1899 until 1909, holding the role a total of three times. Consul of Venezuela in the Trinidad from 1906 until 1907, in 1909 he served as president of the chamber of deputies, and afterwards served a 22-year term as interim president of the Liberator Order. He taught at the Central University of Venezuela in his later years, helping found the Academy of Social and Political Sciences and serving as Dean of the Faculty of Political Science, as well as vice chancellor. He also published several law papers and books before his death in Caracas in 1949.

== Early life and education ==
Guillermo Tell Villegas Pulido was born in Barinas on 28 July 1854 to José Antonio Villegas and Nieves Pulido. His uncle, Guillermo Tell Villegas, was a politician and lawyer in Barinas and Caracas. In the early 1970s Villegas Pulido moved to Caracas to study law at the Central University of Venezuela, where he graduated in 1875.

== Career ==
=== 1876–1891: Early positions ===
Along with his uncle Guillermo Tell Villegas, in 1876 Villegas Pulido helped found the "La Paz" school in Caracas. Also in 1876, Villegas Pulido founded the magazine Literary Alliance (Alianza Literaria), afterwards founding the magazine The Majority (La Mayoría) in 1879, in the city of La Victoria. In 1879, he was appointed as special commissioner of Venezuela in Panama. He served as Secretary of Interior of the Federal District (Caracas) between 1879 and 1880, and secretary general of President Antonio Guzmán Blanco in 1880. In 1881, he served as a trial judge in Caracas. He helped create the newspaper Monitor in 1889 in Ciudad Bolívar in Southeastern Venezuela. Monitor has been described as the first newspaper to react against Antonio Guzmán Blanco. He was elected deputy to the National Congress for the Bolívar state of Venezuela from 1890 until 1892.

=== 1892: Presidential term and hospital ===
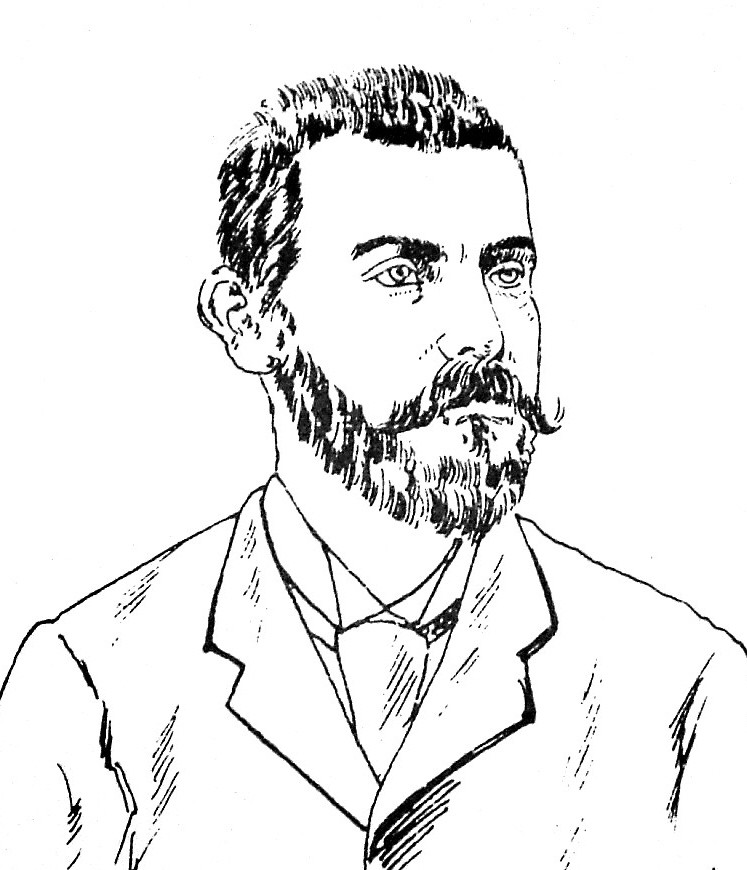
Extract of a caricature of Villegas Pulido, which appeared in the humorist magazine El Diablo in 1892, the year he held the presidency.

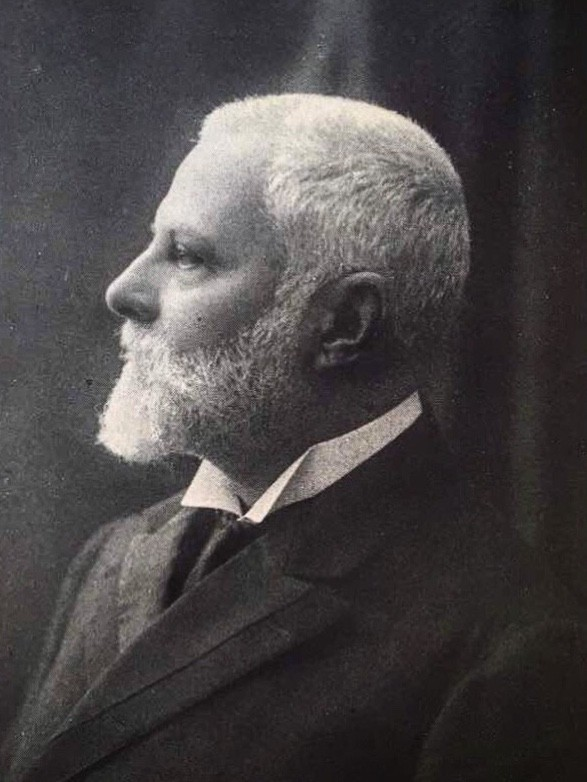
Villegas Pulido, C. 1919.

Villegas Pulido's uncle, Guillermo Tell Villegas, was appointed interim President of Venezuela on 17 June, 1892, while elected president Venezuelan president Raimundo Andueza Palacio was in absentia dealing with the outbreak of the Legalist Revolution (Revolución Legalista). On 31 August, 1892, following the resignation of his uncle, Villegas Pulido was selected by the Federal Council as the provisional president of Venezuela.

Before his short tenure ended on 7 October of that year, he helped establish the Psychiatric Hospital of Caracas (Hospital Psiquiátrico de Caracas), after visiting the Insane Asylum of Los Teques and seeing the neglected conditions of its patients. Seeking better alternatives, Villegas Pulido remodeled an old barracks located in west Caracas, and with contributions and help from the San José de Tarbes Nuns Community, enabled a train to facilitate the transfer of patients to the new building. The asylum was inaugurated on 17 September 1892. His revolution successful, Joaquín Crespo reached Caracas in October 1892 and established himself as president. Villegas Pulido exiled himself and left the country as a result.

=== 1898–1949: State and federal positions ===
Returning to Venezuela in 1898, that year Villegas Pulido headed of government of the state of Falcón. Afterwards, from 1900 until 1901 he led the government of the state of Guárico, followed by the state of Apure from 1903 until 1904. He was also appointed Attorney General of Venezuela in 1899, holding the role until 1909. From 1906 until 1907, he was Consul of Venezuela in the island of Trinidad, and in 1909 he served as president of the chamber of deputies (cámara de diputados). In 1912, he started a 22-year term as interim president of the Order of the Liberator (Orden del Libertador) that lasted until 1934. He served as Attorney General of Venezuela for the second time from 1913 until 1916.

He taught at the Central University of Venezuela in Caracas in his later years. At the university, Villegas Pulido served as Dean of the Faculty of Political Science and vice chancellor from 1930 until 1933, and was also a founding member of the Academy of Social and Political Sciences (Academia de Ciencias Políticas y Sociales). In 1936, he served as Attorney General of Venezuela for the third time. In 1939, he developed the Alphabetic Index of the Laws and Decrees of Venezuela (Indice Aflabetico de la Recopilacion de Leyes y Decretos de Venezuela). In 1940, he published The Inquisition of Paternity Law through Blood Tests (La inquisición de la Paternidad por el examen de la sangre).

== Death ==
Guillermo Tell Villegas Pulido died in Caracas in 1949, in July at the age of 95.

== Bibliography ==
- 1916: Jurisprudencia médica venezolana
- 1919: Los extranjeros en Venezuela: su no admisión, su expulsión
- 1920: El Matrimonio – Estudio de Medicina Legal en relación con la Ley Venezolana
- Estudio sobre el libro El Presidente del doctor R. F. Seijas
- 1938: El certificado prenupcial
- 1939: Índice de Leyes y decretos de los Estados Unidos de Venezuela (Alphabetic Index of the Laws and Decrees of Venezuela)
- 1940: La inquisición de la Paternidad por el examen de la sangre (The Inquisition of Paternity Law through Blood Tests)

== See also ==
- Presidents of Venezuela
- List of presidents of Venezuela
- List of Venezuelan writers

Political offices
Preceded by Guillermo Tell Villegas	President of Venezuela (Interim); 1892	Succeeded by Joaquín Crespo
