= Juan José Landaeta =

Venezuelan composer

Juan José Landaeta (10 March 1780 – 16 October 1814) was a Venezuelan composer.

== Life ==
Born in Caracas, Province of Caracas, Captaincy General of Venezuela, Spanish Empire, his parents (Juan José Landaeta and Maria Candelaria Arévalo) were free mulatos. He studied music at the school of Padre Sojo, with Juan Manuel Olivares. Later, he worked at various churches of Caracas as a violinist and music director.

He was a participant in the Venezuelan War of Independence.
In 1811 he founded the Concert Society Certamen de Música vocal e instrumental.
After the demise of the First Republic, he was put in prison, from which he was freed by the conquest of Simon Bolivar's conquest of Caracas.
He joined the 1814 Caracas Exodus, but fell into the hands of José Tomás Boves in Cumaná, who had him executed.

== Legacy ==
He was a noted writer of religious and patriotic songs. In 1810 he wrote the melody of Gloria al bravo pueblo ("Glory to the brave people") to the lyrics by Vicente Salias. In 1881, it was declared the Venezuelan national anthem by General Antonio Guzmán Blanco. However, its authorship is disputed, others claim it was composed by Lino Gallardo.

Today, the Venezuelan National Conservatory of Music is named for him.

== Works ==
- Tantum ergo (1798), composed with his son Francisco José Velásquez
- Benedictus (1799)
- Salve regina (1800)
- Benedictus y pésame a la Virgen
- Gloria al Bravo Pueblo (1810)
