= April Revolution (Venezuela) =

Revolution in Venezuela

- Part of the Venezuelan civil wars
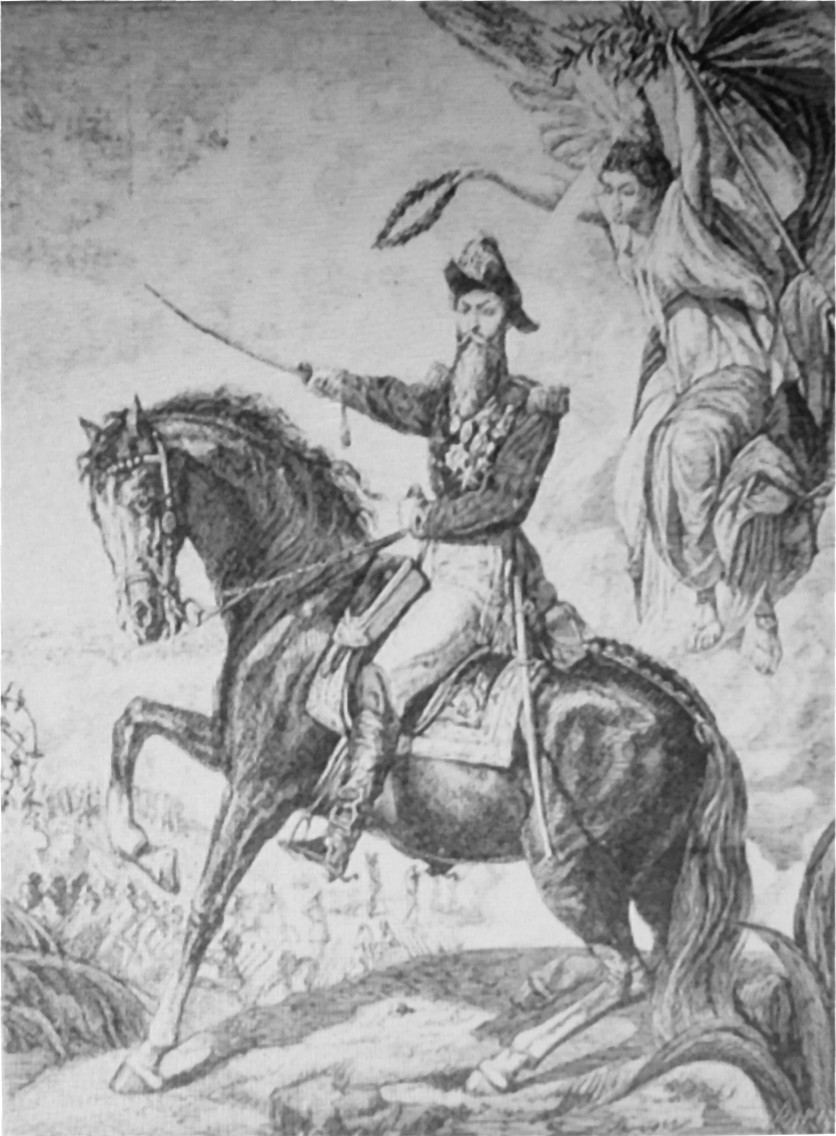
- Antonio Guzmán Blanco at the Battle of Apure.
| Date | 14 February - 27 April 1870 |
| Location | Venezuela |
| Result | Yellow Liberal victory: Surrender of José Ruperto Monagas; End of the Government of the Blues; Beginning of Yellow Liberalism |

Belligerents
| Blue government | Yellow liberals |

Commanders and leaders
| José Ruperto Monagas | Antonio Guzmán Blanco; Joaquín Crespo; Francisco Linares Alcántara |

The April Revolution, also known as the Yellow Revolution, was a successful campaign initiated by Antonio Guzmán Blanco with former leaders of the Venezuelan Federal War (1859-1863), including his most adept followers, Joaquín Crespo and Francisco Linares Alcántara, to overthrow the Blue government of José Ruperto Monagas.

== Background ==
After the Blue Revolution of 1868 that overthrew the government of Juan Crisóstomo Falcón, Antonio Guzmán Blanco had to leave the country as a victim of political persecution.
Meanwhile, instability reigned in Venezuela with constant armed uprisings, among them those of José Ignacio Pulido, Joaquín Crespo, Matías Salazar, León Colina or Francisco Linares Alcántara, against President José Ruperto Monagas.

== Actions ==
Coming from Curaçao and bringing material to quickly assemble a rebel army, Guzmán and his army landed in Curamichate, near La Vela de Coro, on 14 February 1870. By 27 April of the same year, after three days of combat, they enter Caracas triumphantly acclaimed by the people dissatisfied with the government of José Ruperto Monagas. The city had been defended by 1,600 to 2,000 men, most of them armed residents. General Monagas signed the surrender of the government and then began the long term of Antonio Guzmán Blanco as leader of the country (1870-1887), a period known as Yellow Liberalism.

== Consolidation of power ==
Guzman Blanco sent Matías Salazar to fight Blue forces that still refused to surrender. He was victorious in the Battle of Guama which left 800 dead, and which was won thanks to the fact that 200 Blue soldiers defected, encouraged by León Colina. Some 200 enemy soldiers were taken prisoner.

General Adolfo Antonio Olivo managed to gain strength in Maturín by leading the resistance against the new government. However he retreated after being defeated by the troops of José Ignacio Pulido and took refuge in the town of San Fernando de Apure.

In December 1871, Antonio Guzmán Blanco marched with six thousand soldiers to defeat General Olivo in the battle of San Fernando de Apure, after which General Adolfo Antonio Olivo drowned in the Arauca River along with 300 of his men. The Apure State was pacified by the beginning of 1872, consolidating his power.

== Bibliography ==
- Lucca, Rafael Arráiz (mayo de 2007). «6». En Fanuel Hanán Díaz; Lisbeth Cabezas, ed. Historia Contemporánea de Venezuela. Primer año del ciclo diversificado de la Educación Media. (1era edición). Caracas: Larense. pp. 94–95;101.
- Esteves González, Edgar (2006). Las Guerras de Los Caudillos. Caracas: El Nacional. ISBN 980-388-247-3.
- Dixon, Jeffrey S. & Meredith Reid Sarkees (2015). A Guide to Intra-state Wars: An Examination of Civil, Regional, and Intercommunal Wars, 1816–2014. CQ Press. ISBN 9781506317984.
