= Manuel Ezequiel Bruzual =

President of Venezuela

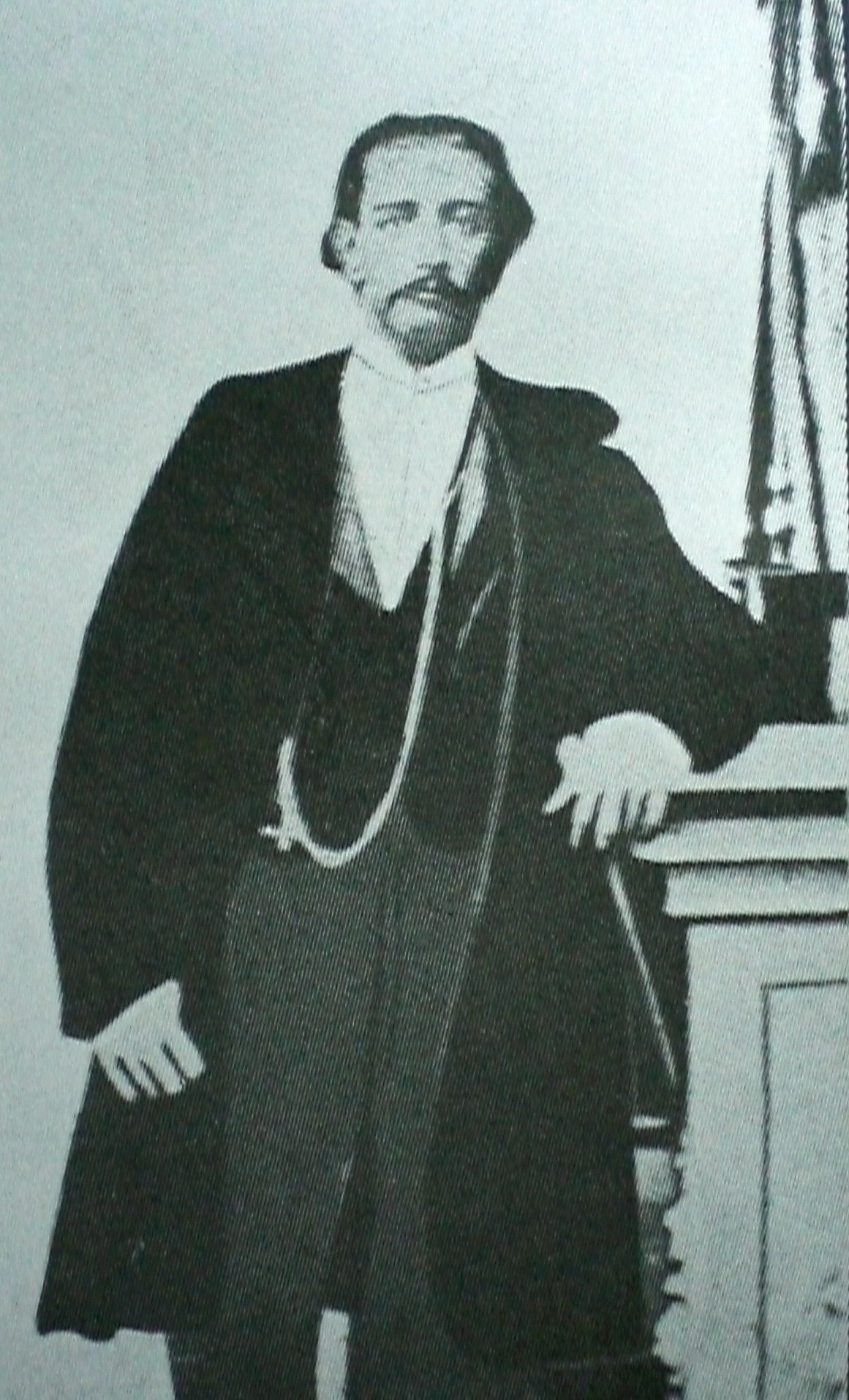

President of Venezuela Interim
- In office 25 April 1868 – 28 June 1868
- Preceded by: Juan Crisóstomo Falcón
- Succeeded by: Guillermo Tell Villegas

Personal details
- Born: 1830 Santa Marta, Province of Santa Marta, Department of Magdalena, Gran Colombia
- Died: 15 August 1868 (aged 37–38) Colony of Curaçao and Dependencies, Netherlands
- Party: Liberal Party
- Spouse: Ramona España

Manuel Ezequiel Bruzual (1830 in Santa Marta, Province of Santa Marta, Department of Magdalena, Gran Colombia – 15 August 1868 in Colony of Curaçao and Dependencies, Netherlands), was a military leader committed to liberal ideas. He was also in charge of the War and Navy Ministry in 1864, and, in 1868, was designated provisional president of Venezuela.

== Biography ==
Bruzual participated actively in the Federal War, being known as the Courageous soldier of Federation, fought in Purereche, Santa Ines, Buchivacoa, Barquisimeto and Portuguesa. Later, once the Federalist movement took government, President Juan Crisóstomo Falcón designated him as War and Navy minister (1864), resigning to the position after being imprisoned for the charges of conspiring.

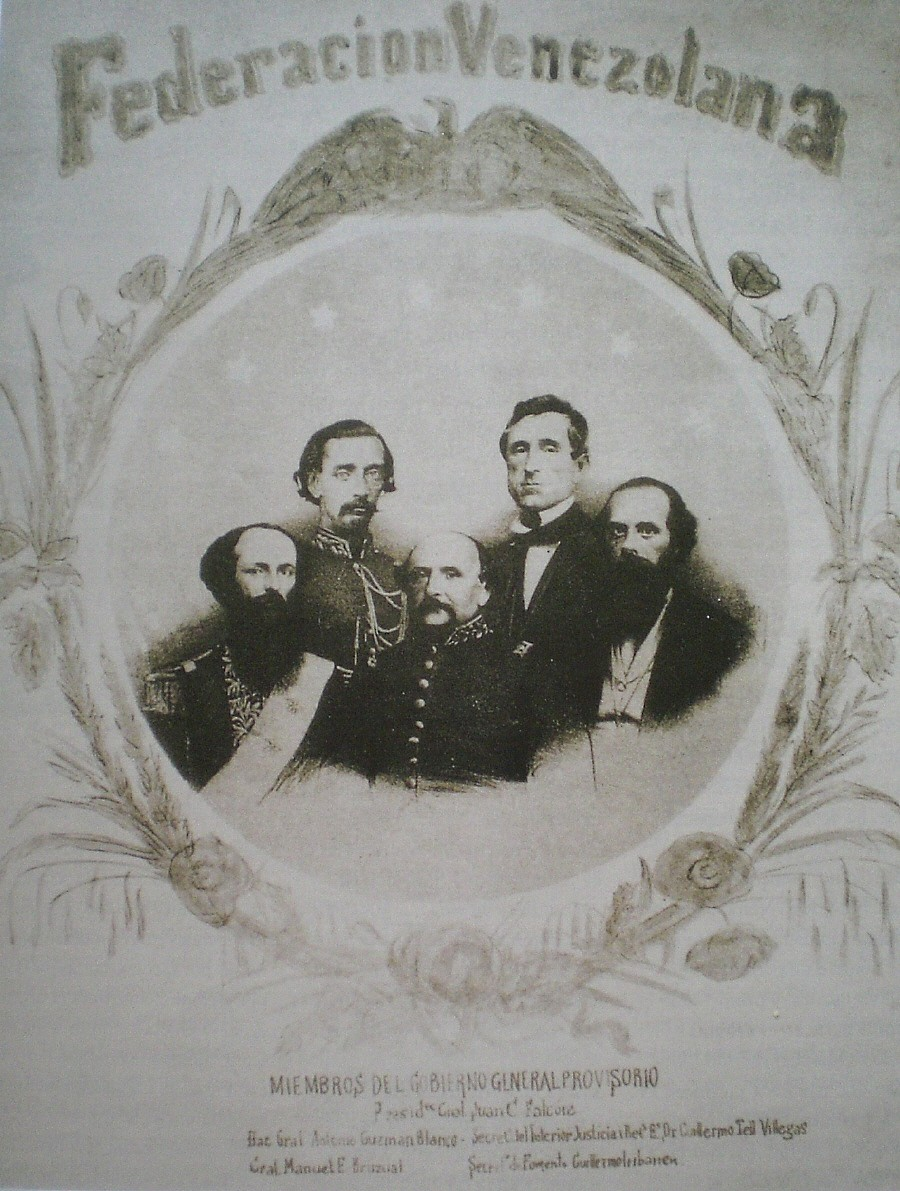
Manuel Ezequiel Bruzual (Second of left) in a poster allusive to Venezuelan Federation, C. 1860s

In 1866, he was named Head of the General Staff of the Army. On 6 April 1868, in Güigüe, he had an interview with Miguel Antonio Rojas, Head of the Army of the Revolución Azul (Blue Revolution), and agreed the suspension of the hostilities by the lapse of 15 days, in order to discuss a treaty of peace, which was signed on 11 May. On 25 April 1868, he was put in charge of the Presidency of Venezuela. Later, on 19 June, had an interview with José Tadeo Monagas, leader of the Revolución Azul, but did not obtain an agreement, and the Government was overthrown.

Bruzual departed to Puerto Cabello, and thence is proclaimed in exercise of the presidency, he enlists troops, but was defeated by José Ruperto Monagas, on 14 August 1868. Manuel Ezequiel Bruzual died in Curaçao on 15 August 1868 of wounds suffered in battle.

In 1872, his remains were repatriated by order of President Antonio Guzmán Blanco, being commissioned by his relative Blas Bruzual.

A municipality in Anzoátegui state was named after him, along with a town in Apure (Bruzual) and another in Portuguesa (Villa Bruzual).

Political offices
Preceded by Juan Crisóstomo Falcón	President of Venezuela; 1868	Succeeded by Guillermo Tell Villegas
