= José Gregorio Valera =

President of Venezuela from 1878 to 1879

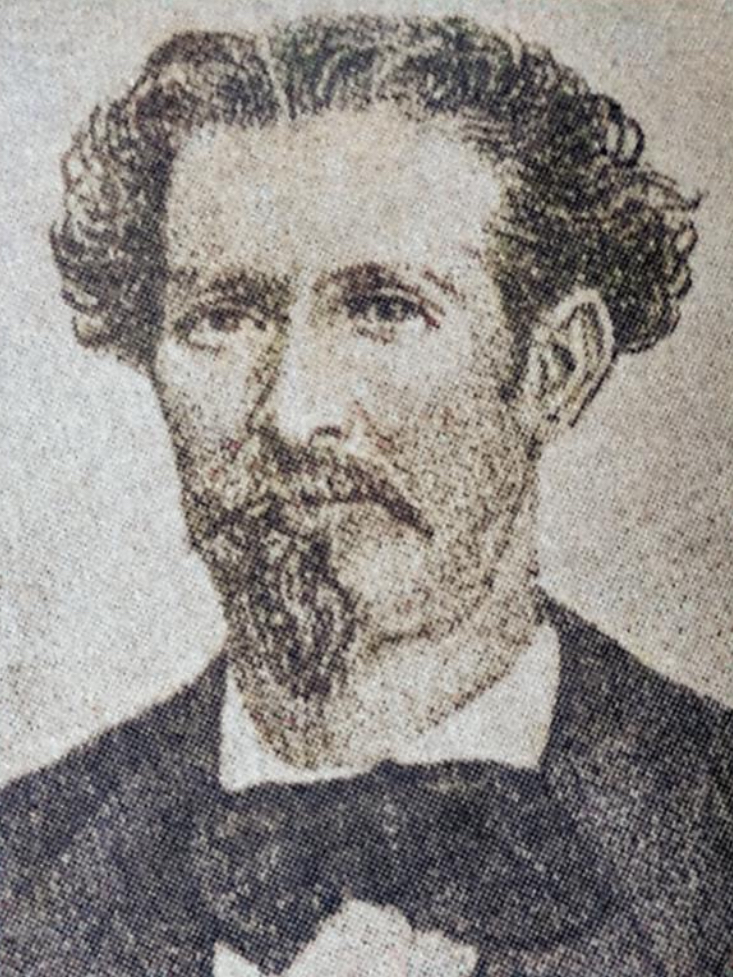

21st President of Venezuela
- In office 15 December 1878 – 13 February 1879
- Preceded by: Francisco Linares Alcántara
- Succeeded by: Antonio Guzmán Blanco

Personal details
- Party: Liberal Party
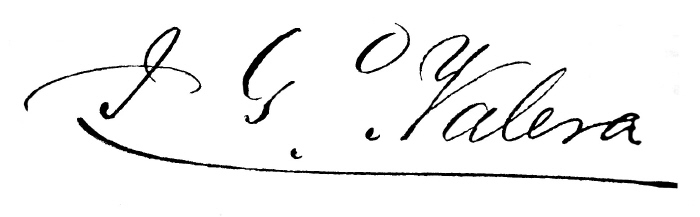
- Signature

José Gregorio Valera was the president of Venezuela from 15 December 1878 to 13 February 1879. He was a half brother of his predecessor Francisco Linares Alcántara. He was overthrown by the general José Gregorio Cedeño, who proclaimed the new president of the country the former president Antonio Guzmán Blanco.

Political offices
Preceded by Francisco Linares Alcántara	President of Venezuela; 1878 – 1879	Succeeded by Antonio Guzmán Blanco
