= Gloria al Bravo Pueblo =

National anthem of Venezuela

English: 'Glory to the Brave People'
- National anthem of Venezuela
- Also known as: La Marsellesa Venezolana (English: 'The Venezuelan Marseillaise')
- Lyrics: Vicente Salias or Andrés Bello, 1810
- Music: Juan José Landaeta (attributed)
- Adopted: 1881

Audio sample
- U.S. Navy Band instrumental rendition in B-flat major: file; help

Gloria al Bravo Pueblo (lit. 'Glory to the Brave People') is the national anthem of Venezuela. Its lyrics were written by physician and journalist Vicente Salias in 1810, set to music later composed by musician Juan José Landaeta. Owing to musical similarities with the French national anthem, beginning in 1840 "Gloria al Bravo Pueblo" was known as "La Marsellesa Venezolana" ('The Venezuelan Marseillaise'). It was declared Venezuela's national anthem by decree of President Antonio Guzmán Blanco on May 25, 1881.

== History ==
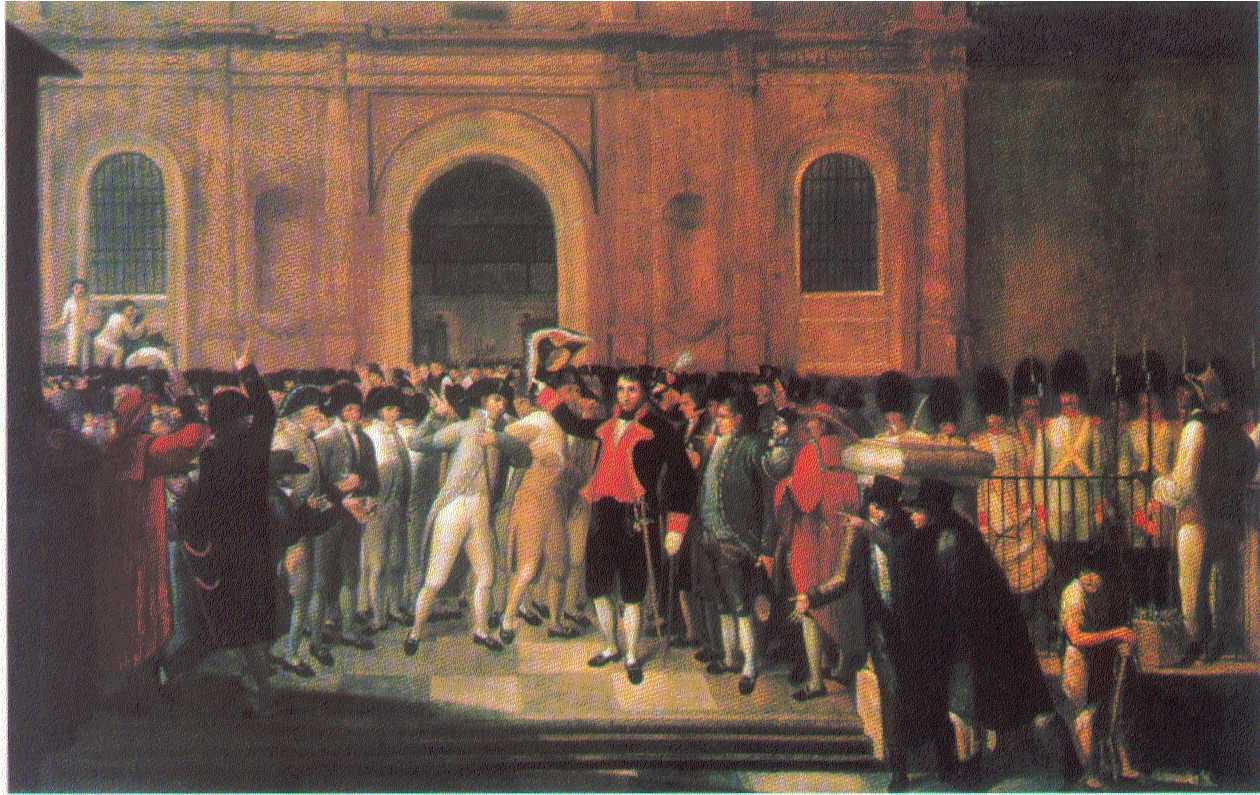
The 19th of April, 1810, by Juan Lovera.

The Patriotic Society was formed in Caracas as a result of the Revolution of April 19, 1810, One of its meetings, Existed by the Success of Its Patriotic Song, Caraqueños, Otra Época Inicia. Composed by Cayetano Carreño and Lyrics by Andrés Bello, suggested that the proposal for the Society was also launch a Patriotic March that stimulated the mood for the undecided. On April 18, 1868, newspaper El Federalista published the official lyrics written by Salias, which commemorated the 58th Anniversary of Independence the day before in the capital, mentioned that "in the halls of the University and in the presence of large public, before the speeches, a «martial music» performed several pieces, among them the National Anthem ".

Commissioned by President Antonio Guzmán Blanco, Dr. Eduardo Calcaño arranged the musical text of the Anthem, retaining the original melody without altering its expression.

On May 25, 1881, the Gloria al Bravo Pueblo was definitively consecrated as the National Anthem of Venezuela, by means of a decree issued by the then President, Antonio Guzmán Blanco. After this decree and the publications of the National Anthem that were made in 1883, a new official edition was produced in 1911 to commemorate the centenary of independence, which was entrusted to Salvador Llamozas. In 1947 the current structure of the musical and lyricial ambiance was overhauled by composer Juan Bautista Plaza.

=== Disputed composition ===
However, this theory has not been fully proven; although the truth is that both Juan José Landaeta and Lino Gallardo belonged to the "School of Music of Caracas", the central activity of the "Archdiocesan Oratory of Caracas", founded by Pedro Palacios y Sojo.

It was thus that one of the members of the Patriotic Society, poet Vicente Salias, improvised there the first verses of the National Anthem on it was originally written around 1810 as a patriotic hymn. Later official modifications have been written by Eduardo Calcaño (1881), Salvador Llamozas (1911) and Juan Bautista Plaza (1947).

== Lyrics ==
Spanish original

Coro:
𝄆 Gloria al Bravo Pueblo
que el yugo lanzó
la ley respetando
la virtud y honor 𝄇

𝄆 «¡Abajo cadenas!» 𝄇
𝄆 Gritaba el Señor 𝄇
y el pobre en su choza
libertad pidió
A este santo nombre
tembló de pavor
el vil egoísmo
que otra vez triunfó
𝄆 A este santo nombre 𝄇
tembló de pavor
𝄆 el vil egoísmo
que otra vez triunfó 𝄇

Coro

𝄆 Gritemos con brío 𝄇
𝄆 ¡Muera la opresión! 𝄇
Compatriotas fieles
la fuerza es la unión
y desde el empíreo
el Supremo Autor
un sublime aliento
al pueblo infundió
𝄆 y desde el empíreo 𝄇
el Supremo Autor
𝄆 un sublime aliento
al pueblo infundió 𝄇

Coro

𝄆 Unida con lazos 𝄇
𝄆 que el cielo formó 𝄇
la América toda
existe en Nación
y si el despotismo
levanta la voz
seguid el ejemplo
que Caracas dio
𝄆 y si el despotismo 𝄇
levanta la voz
𝄆 seguid el ejemplo
que Caracas dio 𝄇

Coro

IPA transcription (Note: See Help:IPA/Spanish and Venezuelan Spanish.)

[ˈko.ɾo]
𝄆 [ˈɡlo.ɾj(a)‿al ˈβɾa.βo ˈpwe.βlo]
[k(e)‿el ˈɟʝu.ɣo lan.ˈso |]
[la ˈlej res.pe.ˈtan.do]
[la βiɾ.ˈtuð i‿o.ˈnoɾ ‖] 𝄇

𝄆 [a.ˈβa.xo ka.ˈðe.nas ‖] 𝄇
𝄆 [ɡɾi.ˈta.βa‿el se.ˈɲoɾ ‖] 𝄇
[i‿el ˈpo.βɾ(e)‿en su ˈtʃo.sa]
[li.βeɾ.ˈtað pi.ˈðjo |]
[a‿ˈes.te ˈsan.to ˈnom.bɾe]
[tem.ˈblo ðe pa.ˈβoɾ |]
[el ˈβil e.ɣo.ˈiz.mo]
[ke‿ˈo.tɾa ˈβes tɾjuɱ.ˈfo ‖]
𝄆 [a‿ˈes.te ˈsan.to ˈnom.bɾe] 𝄇
[tem.ˈblo ðe pa.ˈβoɾ |]
𝄆 [el ˈβil e.ɣo.ˈiz.mo]
[ke‿ˈo.tɾa ˈβes tɾjuɱ.ˈfo ‖] 𝄇

[ˈko.ɾo]

𝄆 [ɡɾi.ˈte.mos kom ˈbɾi.o ‖] 𝄇
𝄆 [ˈmwe.ɾa la‿o.pɾe.ˈsjon ‖] 𝄇
[kom.pa.ˈtɾjo.tas ˈfje.les]
[la ˈfweɾ.sa‿ez la‿u.ˈnjon |]
[i ˈðez.ð(e)‿el em.ˈpi.ɾe.o]
[el su.ˈpɾe.mo‿aw.ˈtoɾ |]
[un su.ˈβli.me‿a.ˈljen.to]
[al ˈpwe.βlo‿iɱ.fun.ˈdjo ‖]
𝄆 [i ˈðez.ð(e)‿el em.ˈpi.ɾe.o] 𝄇
[el su.ˈpɾe.mo‿aw.ˈtoɾ |]
𝄆 [un su.ˈβli.me‿a.ˈljen.to]
[al ˈpwe.βlo‿iɱ.fun.ˈdjo ‖] 𝄇

[ˈko.ɾo]

𝄆 [u.ˈni.ða kon ˈla.sos ‖] 𝄇
𝄆 [k(e)‿el ˈsje.lo foɾ.ˈmo ‖] 𝄇
[l(a)‿a.ˈme.ɾi.ka ˈtoða]
[ek.ˈsis.t(e)‿en na.ˈsjon |]
[i si‿el des.po.ˈtiz.mo]
[le.ˈβan.ta la ˈβos |]
[se.ˈɣið el e.ˈxem.plo]
[ke ka.ˈɾa.kaz ˈðjo ‖]
𝄆 [i si‿el des.po.ˈtiz.mo] 𝄇
[le.ˈβan.ta la ˈβos |]
𝄆 [se.ˈɣið el e.ˈxem.plo]
[ke ka.ˈɾa.kaz ˈðjo ‖] 𝄇

[ˈko.ɾo]

English translation

Chorus:
𝄆 Glory to the brave people
who shook off the yoke,
The law respecting,
virtue and honour. 𝄇

𝄆 "Down with chains!" 𝄇
𝄆 Shouted the Lord; 𝄇
And the poor man in his hovel
For Freedom implored.
Upon this holy name
Trembled in great dread
The vile selfishness
That had once prevailed.
𝄆 Upon this holy name 𝄇
Trembled in great dread
𝄆 The vile selfishness
That had once prevailed. 𝄇

Chorus

𝄆 Let's scream out aloud: 𝄇
𝄆 "Death to oppression!" 𝄇
Oh, loyal countrymen:
Strength is unity;
And from the Empyrean
The Supreme Author
A sublime spirit
To the people blew;
𝄆 And from the Empyrean 𝄇
The Supreme Author
𝄆 A sublime spirit
To the people blew. 𝄇

Chorus

𝄆 United by bonds 𝄇
𝄆 That Heaven has formed, 𝄇
The entire America
Exists as a Nation;
And if ever despotism
Raises again its voice,
Then follow the example
That Caracas gave;
𝄆 And if ever despotism 𝄇
Raises again its voice,
𝄆 Then follow the example
That Caracas gave. 𝄇

Chorus

Wayuu version

Koro:
𝄆 Ju'wajüna Jaashichin Woumain
Süka Taashajiraippain
Suma Kojutuin Tü Leikat
Anamia Je Wayuuwaa 𝄇

𝄆 «¡Süsiwata Apüü!» 𝄇
𝄆 A'watchi Washitkai 𝄇
Je Chi Mojushkai Sulu'uje Nipia'ata
Achuntushi Taashii
Sükaje Tü Anülie Pülaskat
Eimolojoosü Jeema
Tü Maalijirawakat
Tü Ayamütka Jüchikua'aya
𝄆 Sükaje Tü Anülie Pülaskat
Eimolojoosü Jeema 𝄇
𝄆 Tü Maalijirawakat
Tü Ayamütka Jüchikua'aya 𝄇

Koro

𝄆 Emetulu Wekiisa 𝄇
𝄆 Kettaiwa Tü Müliakat 𝄇
Wa'lemuyuuwa
Shia Watchinka Tü Paa'inwajiwawaakat
Je Chaje Iipünaje, Chi
Kakumalakai Kasa
¡Toolo Jaa'in! Müshi
Jümüin Wayuu.
𝄆 Je Chaje Iipünaje, Chi
Kakumalakai Kasa 𝄇
𝄆 ¡Toolo Jaa'in! Müshi
Jümüin Wayuu. 𝄇

Koro

𝄆 Apatkunajiraanüsü 𝄇
𝄆 Jutuma Sirumakat 𝄇
Eiipa Amerika
Sulu'u Mmain
Ma'aka Jiyalerai Tü
E'raakat Wayuumüin
Ju'uwaata Jümüin
Jüshata Tü Jaa'inraka Karaaka
𝄆 Ma'aka Jiyalerai Tü
E'raakat Wayuumüin 𝄇
𝄆 Ju'uwaata Jümüin
Jüshata Tü Jaa'inraka Karaaka 𝄇

Koro

Children singing the national anthem in Wayuunaki, Maracaibo, c. 2009.

== Regulations and usage ==
The official broadcast of the national anthem is played on all radio stations, national and regional television networks every day of the week at 12:00 am and 6:00 am (sometimes on 12:00 pm during National Holidays) mandatorily accorded by the law passed in 1954 (either the full version or the chorus, first stanza and chorus).

On radio broadcasts in some of the regional radio stations, the state anthem is played after the national anthem, which is also the case for state TV stations.

In most occasions, only the chorus, first stanza and the chorus are played, or even the chorus itself. Sometimes the chorus is played twice in the beginning, and once in the rest of the anthem. In formal events (if the anthem will be played by either a military band, concert band or orchestra) the format is: chorus (2x), first verse and chorus (2x), with the optional introduction. If played in full the chorus is sung twice, with or without the introductory notes.
