= Vicente Salias =

Venezuelan medical doctor and writer

Vicente Salias (March 23, 1776 – September 17, 1814) was a Venezuelan medical doctor, journalist, and writer who wrote Venezuela's "Gloria al Bravo Pueblo" "Glory to the Brave People." national anthem. Born in Puerto Cabello, Carabobo on March 23, 1776.

== Family ==
Salias' parents were Francisco Salias Tordesillo and María Margarita Sanija Cabeza de Vaca. He had four siblings and the names were Juan Marino, Carlos Pedro and Francisco Salias who fought for the emancipation movement. All perished during the struggle except Francisco. He enrolled in philosophy courses in the Universidad Central de Venezuela, University of Caracas on September 18, 1788. Three years later he took several courses in Law, which he dropped out a year later.

Still pursuing much more academic achievement during high school, he enrolled in medicine and his mentor during this time was Felipe Tamariz, who was an important influence in shaping a future scholar. He graduated from high school with a degree in Philosophy and a year later earned another degree in medicine, all of this was before going to college. In that same year, he enrolls as a medical student and begins his illustrious career in medicine.

His biggest contributions were his articles 1804 and 1805 on Small Pox Vaccination.

He was the founder and leader of the Patriotic Society of Caracas (Sociedad Patriotica de Caracas). Following the events of the Revolution of April 19, 1810 where Salias and his brothers participated actively, the commanding General and other colonial officials designated by Joseph Bonaparte to oversee the Captaincy General of Venezuela, were deposed by an expanded municipal government in Caracas that called itself: the Supreme Junta to Preserve the Rights of Ferdinand VII (La Suprema Junta Conservadora de los Derechos de Fernando VII). One of the first measures of revolutionaries was to send diplomatic missions abroad to seek support and recognition of the Supreme Junta of Caracas as the legitimate councilor of Venezuela in the absence of the King. Salias along with Mariano Montilla were sent by the Junta to Jamaica and Curaçao to spread the news about revolutionaries events in Venezuela.In charged of the Ministry of Finance, and collaborated with General Francisco de Miranda during the First Republic of Venezuela. He was captured by the Spaniards and was transferred to the castle of Puerto Cabello and Valencia, which then was released 1813.

Salias fought alongside Simon Bolivar, Venezuela's liberator, and in the year 1814 he was captured and executed in the Castle of San Felipe. His last words were "God Almighty if in the Heavens they admit the Spaniards, then I renounce to the Heavens!".
