= Francisco Linares Alcántara =

Venezuelan politician (1825–1878)

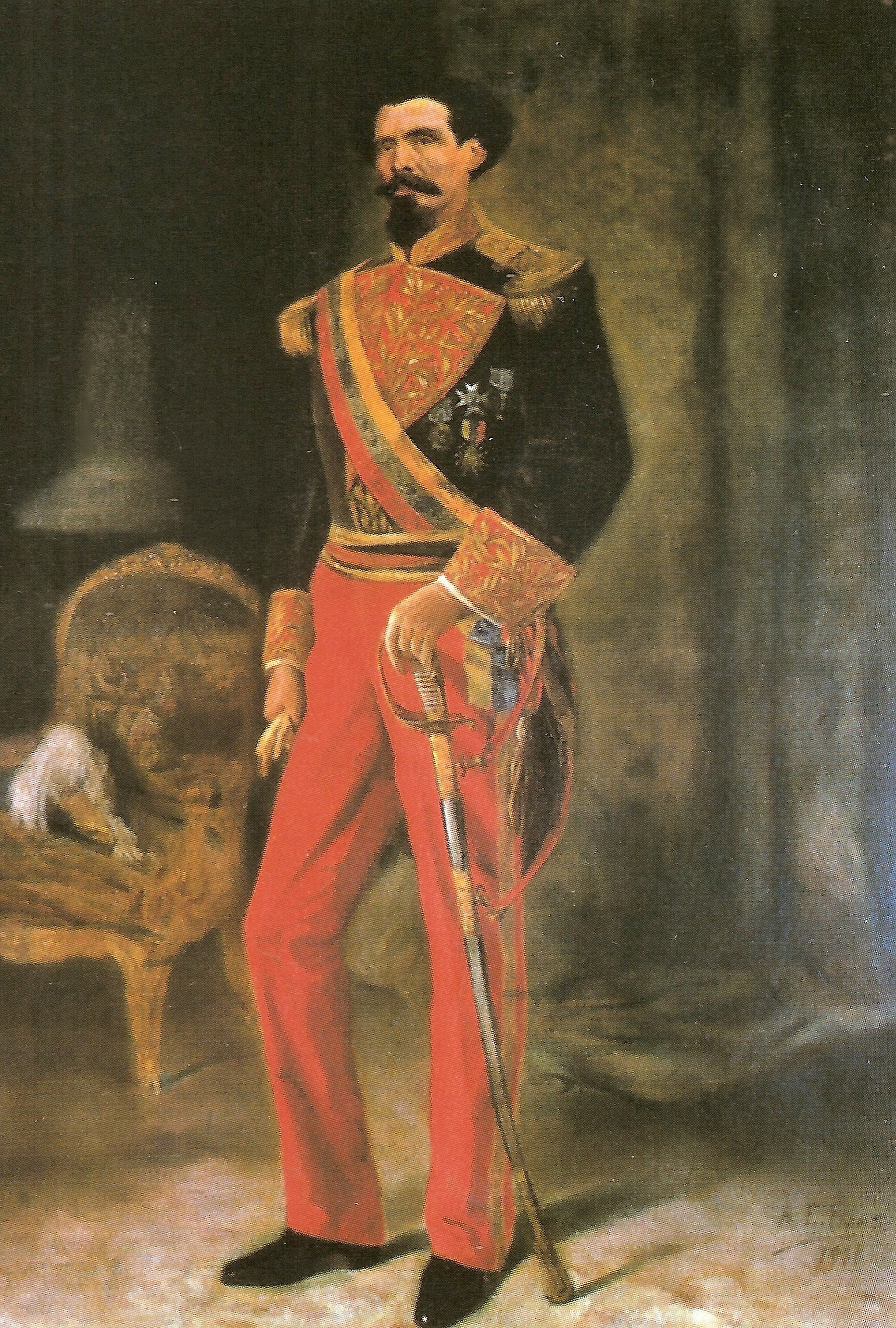

20th President of Venezuela
- In office 27 February 1877 – 30 November 1878
- Preceded by: Antonio Guzmán Blanco
- Succeeded by: José Gregorio Valera

Personal details
- Born: 13 April 1825 Turmero, Aragua state, Venezuela
- Died: 30 November 1878 (aged 53) La Guaira, Venezuela
- Party: Liberal Party
- Spouse: Belén Esteves Yánes
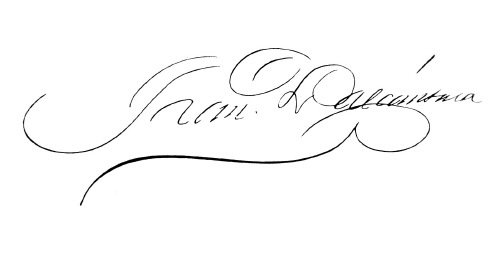
- Signature

Francisco de Paula Linares Alcántara (13 April 1825 – 30 November 1878) was the president of Venezuela (1877–1878) and a member of the Liberal Party of Venezuela.

== Early life and family ==
Francisco Linares Alcántara was born on 13 April 1825, in Turmero, Aragua to General Francisco de Paula Alcántara and Trinidad Linares. His father was one of the heroes of the Venezuelan War of Independence.

Francisco Linares Alcántara later married to Belén Esteves Yánes, who served as First Lady of Venezuela from 1877 to 1878.

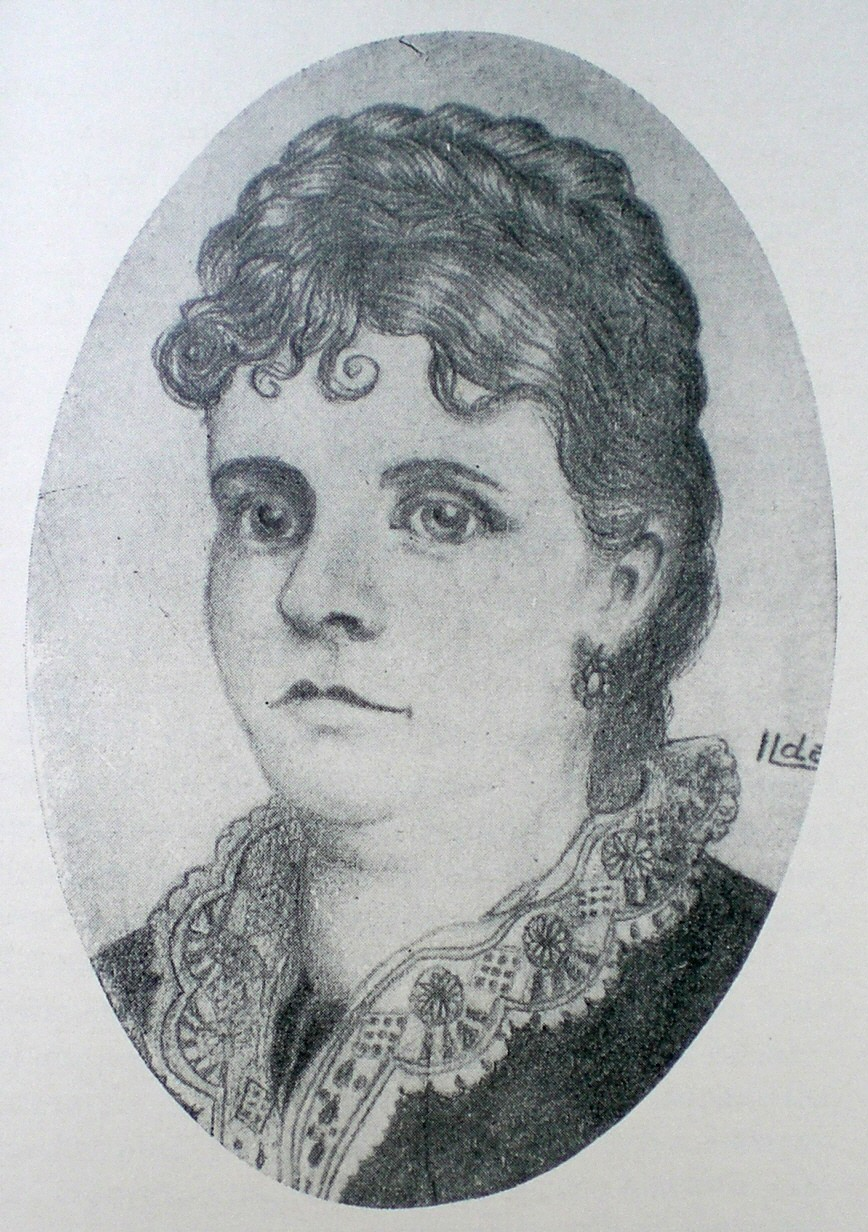
Belén Esteves Yánes

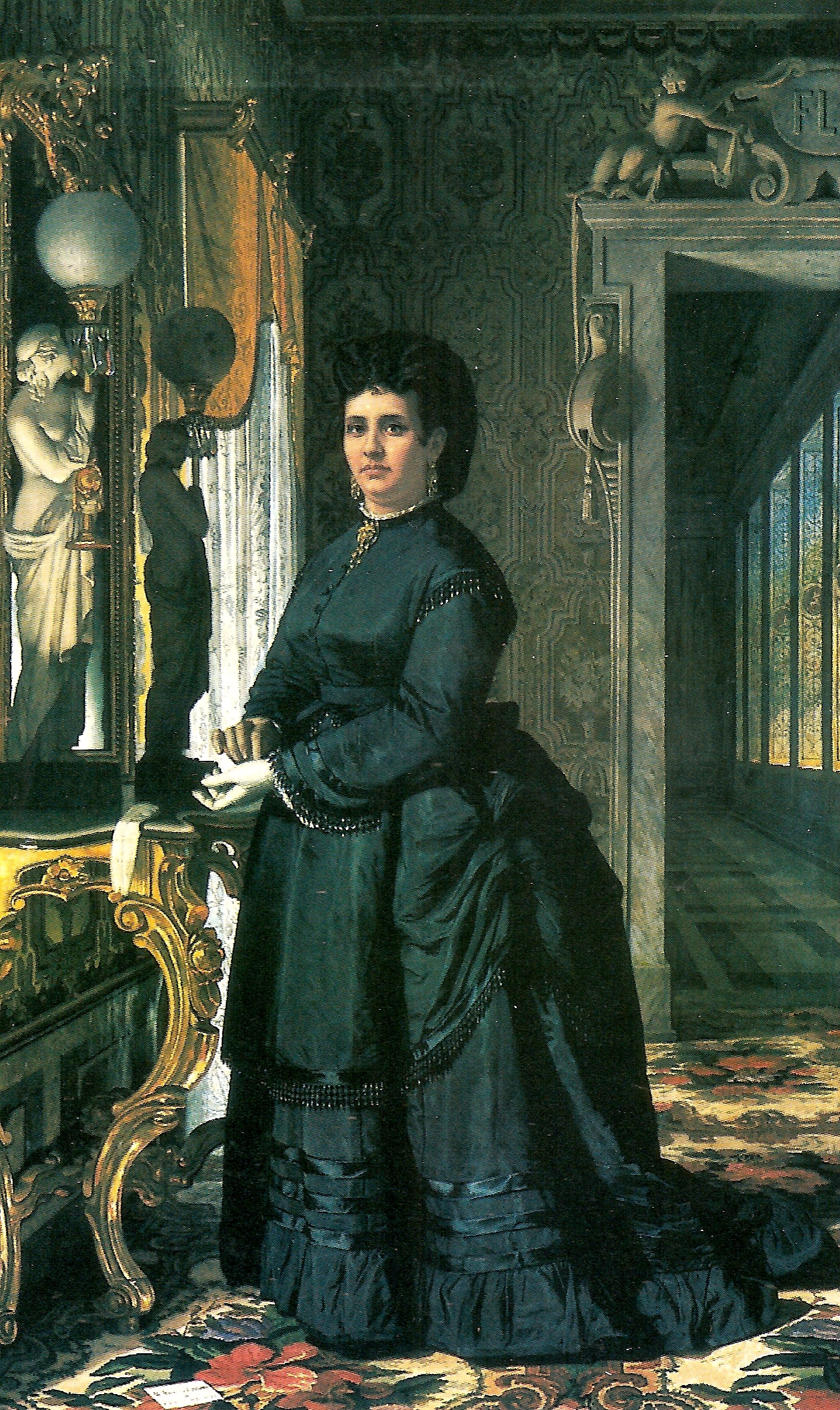
Belén Esteves Yánez de Linares Alcantara (wife)

== Career ==
Francisco Linares Alcántara began his career as a soldier in 1846 and fought during the insurrections carried out by Ezequiel Zamora and Francisco Rangel. Due to the political instability in Venezuela from 1847 to 1858, Alcántara also fought to defend state institutions during the administrations of Jose Tadeo Monagas and Jose Gregorio Monagas. By 1854, he became a deputy to the National Congress from the state of Aragua before fighting again during the Federal War (1858–1863) and along with Antonio Guzman Blanco for the Liberal cause between 1868 and 1870.

=== Presidency ===
Alcántara was elected president in February 1877 and his administration became known for its liberal policies such as more autonomy given to the states, political amnesties, and increased freedom of the press.

== Gallery ==
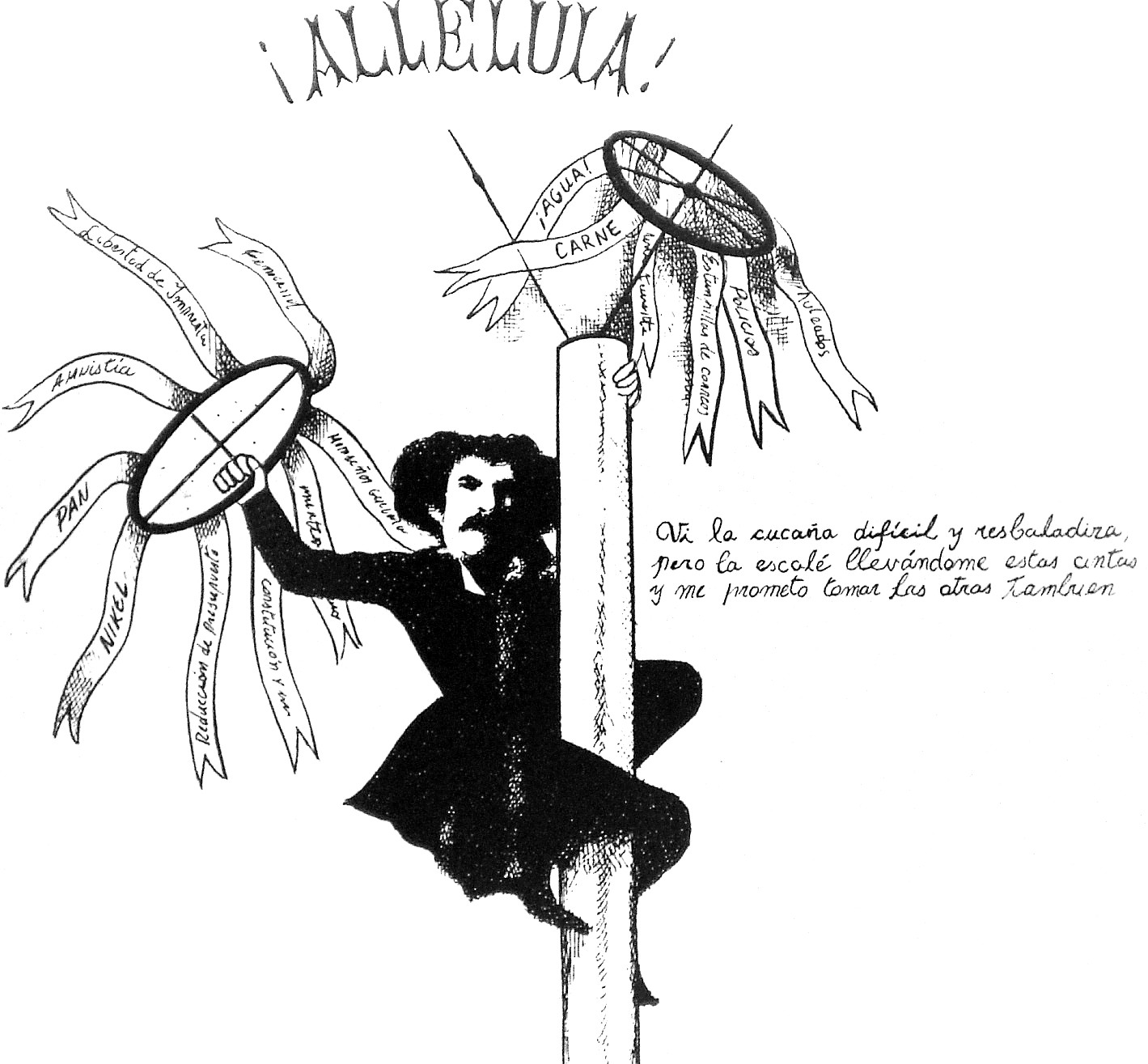
Linares Alcántara in an 1877 caricature

== See also ==
- Revindicating Revolution
- List of presidents of Venezuela

Political offices
Preceded by Antonio Guzmán Blanco	President of Venezuela; 1877–1878	Succeeded by José Gregorio Valera
