= José Ruperto Monagas =

Venezuelan politician

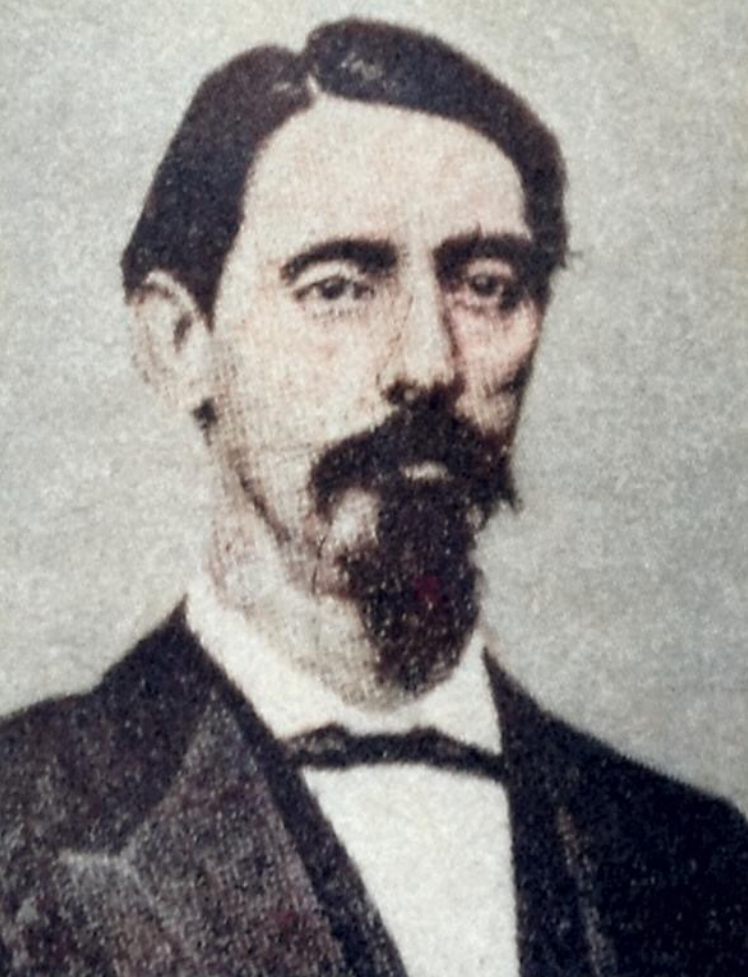

18th President of Venezuela
- In office 20 February 1869 – 16 April 1870
- Preceded by: Guillermo Tell Villegas
- Succeeded by: Guillermo Tell Villegas

Personal details
- Born: 1831 Aragua de Barcelona, Anzoátegui, Venezuela
- Died: 12 June 1880 (aged 48–49) Aragua de Barcelona, Anzoátegui, Venezuela
- Spouse: Esperanza Hernández

José Ruperto Monagas Oriach (1831 – 12 June 1880) was a Venezuelan politician, son of José Tadeo Monagas and Luisa Oriach. He was the president of Venezuela between 1869 and 1870.

As a representative of the city of Maturín, he made the Constitution of April of that year. In March of the following year, he was appointed commander of Barcelona, a position from which he was a supporter of President Julián Castro, despite which General Justo Briceño, a representative of the Government, imprisoned him in the castle of Puerto Cabello distrusting his loyalty. towards the regime.

== Biography ==
Born in Aragua de Barcelona in 1831 and died in the same town on June 12, 1880.

== Personal life ==
José Ruperto Monagas was married to Esperanza Hernández, who served as First Lady of Venezuela from 1869 to 1870.

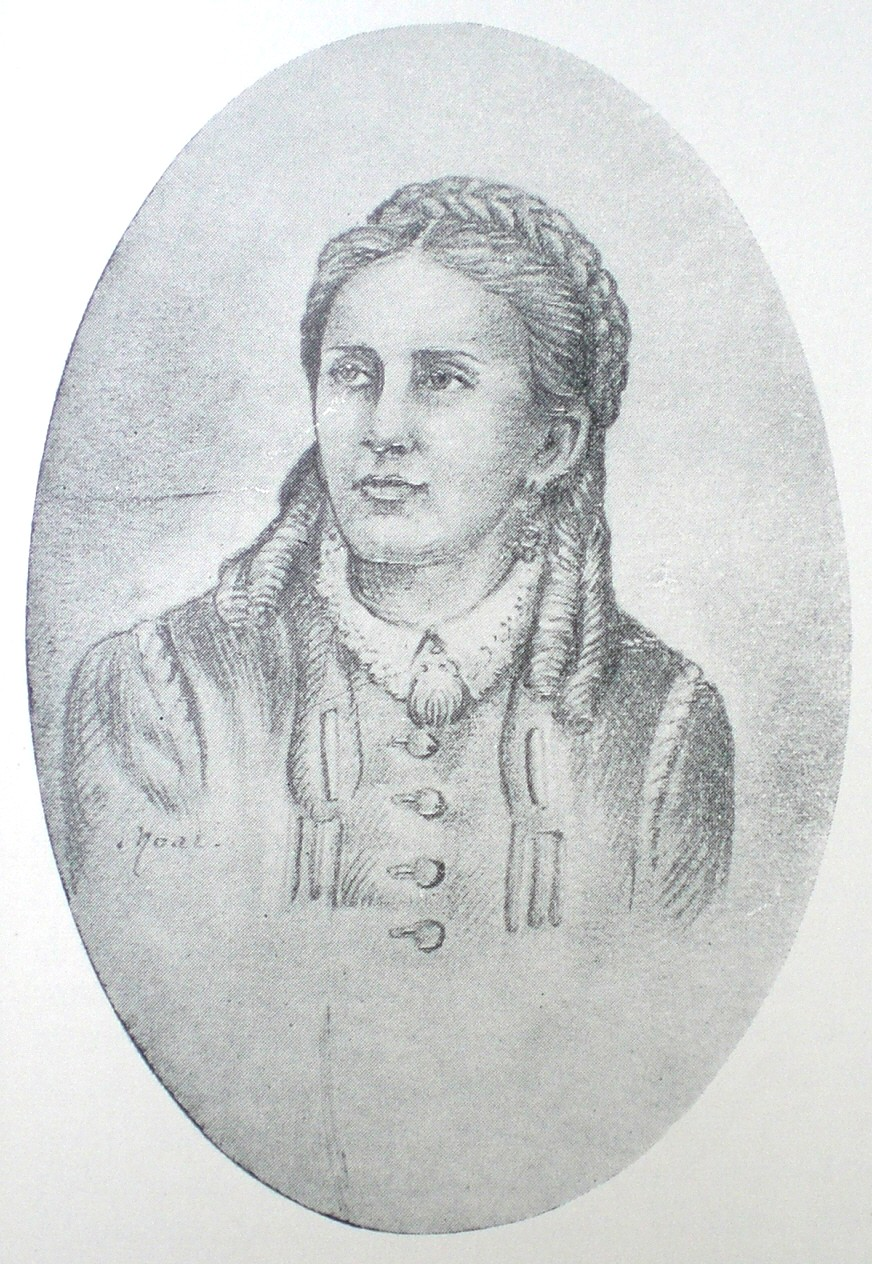
Esperanza Hernández

== See also ==
- Presidents of Venezuela

Political offices
Preceded by Guillermo Tell Villegas	President of Venezuela; 1869–1870	Succeeded by Guillermo Tell Villegas
