= Cilia Flores =

First Lady of Venezuela from 2013 to 2026

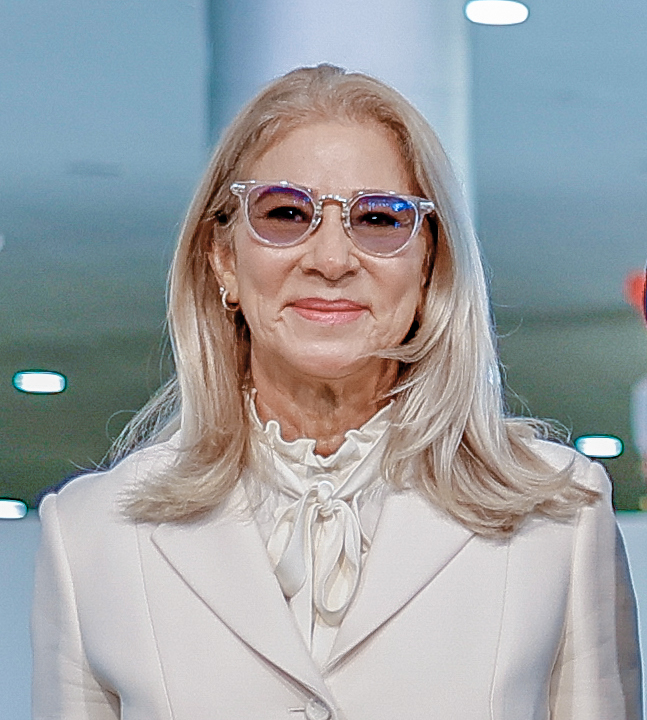
- Flores in 2023

First Lady of Venezuela
- In role 5 March 2013 (Note: Acting: 5 March – 19 April 2013) – 5 January 2026
- President: Nicolás Maduro
- Preceded by: Marisabel Rodríguez de Chávez
- Succeeded by: Vacant

4th President of the National Assembly
- In office 15 August 2006 – 5 January 2011
- President: Hugo Chávez
- Preceded by: Nicolás Maduro
- Succeeded by: Fernando Soto Rojas

Attorney General of Venezuela
- In office 25 January 2012 – 11 March 2013
- President: Hugo Chávez; Nicolás Maduro (acting)
- Preceded by: Carlos Escarrá
- Succeeded by: Manuel Enrique Galindo

Member of the National Assembly
- Incumbent
- Assumed office 5 January 2021
- Constituency: National List
- In office 5 January 2016 – 5 January 2021
- Constituency: Cojedes
- In office 30 July 2000 – 2 February 2012
- Constituency: Capital District

Member of the National Constituent Assembly
- In office 4 August 2017 – 18 December 2020

Personal details
- Born: Cilia Adela Flores; 15 October 1956 (age 70) Tinaquillo, Cojedes, Republic of Venezuela
- Party: PSUV (since 2007)
- Other political affiliations: MVR (1997-2006)
- Spouses: Walter Gavidia Rodríguez (div.); Nicolás Maduro (m. 2013)
- Children: 3
- Profession: Lawyer
- Criminal information
- Status: Incarcerated at the Metropolitan Detention Center

Cilia Adela Flores de Maduro (born 15 October 1956) is a Venezuelan lawyer and politician who served as the first lady of Venezuela from 2013 to 2026, as the wife of Nicolás Maduro, the 53rd president of Venezuela. A member of the United Socialist Party of Venezuela, she served as president of National Assembly of Venezuela from 2006 to 2011. On 3 January 2026, she and Maduro were captured and extracted out of Venezuela following the United States intervention, resulting in their de facto removal from power.

Born into a lower middle-class family in Tinaquillo, Flores graduated from the Universidad Santa María with a law degree. In 2017, the Constituent National Assembly was founded in which she was a member of the Presidential Commission.

Flores and Maduro made their initial court appearance in a Manhattan federal court on 5 January 2026, with each pleading not guilty to numerous drug trafficking charges. The couple was previously indicted by the United States District Court for the Southern District of New York on various drug charges in 2021 for which their extradition was sought.

== Early life ==
Flores was born in Tinaquillo on 15 October 1956, and raised in Caracas. She is the daughter of Cilia Adela Flores, who died in March 2016, and Julio Seijas. Flores is from a lower middle-class background. She graduated with a law degree from the Universidad Santa María in Caracas, specializing in criminal and labor law.

== Political career ==
As the lead attorney for Hugo Chávez's defense team, she helped secure Chávez's release from prison in 1994 after his unsuccessful coup in 1992.

=== Tactical Command for the Revolution ===
While serving as chair of the Political Command of the Bolivarian Revolution, Flores was part of the Tactical Command for the Revolution, an organization that ran the majority of Hugo Chávez's political machine. On 7 April, days before the 2002 Venezuelan coup d'état attempt, Flores, along with Guillermo García Ponce and Freddy Bernal shared plans of using the Bolivarian Circles as a paramilitary force to end opposition marches and defend Chávez in Miraflores Palace by organizing them into brigades.

=== National Assembly ===
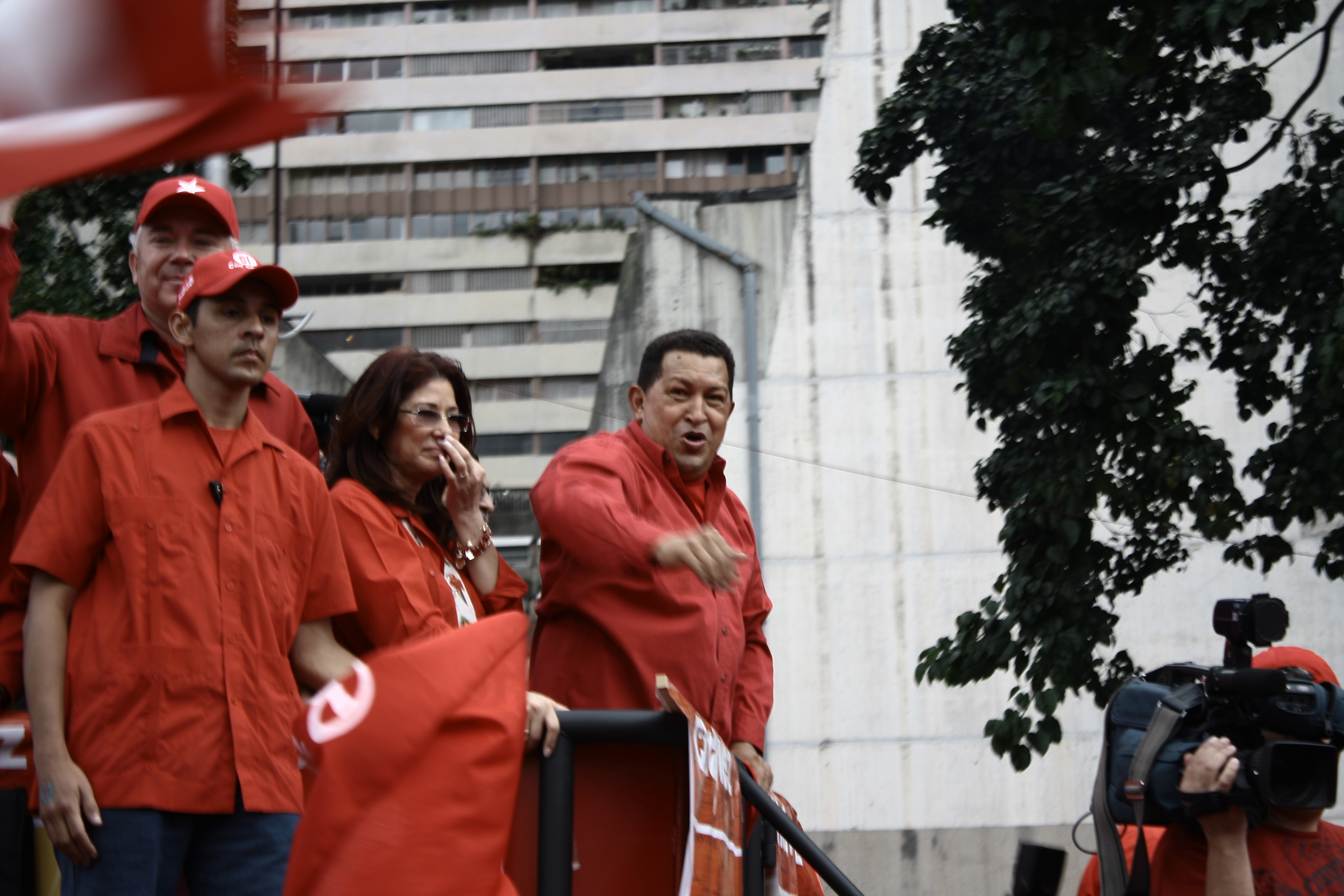
Flores with President Hugo Chávez in 2009

In 2000, Flores was elected as a deputy in the National Assembly.

As a member of the United Socialist Party of Venezuela (PSUV), Flores replaced her future husband Maduro as Speaker of the Assembly in August 2006 when he was appointed Minister of Foreign Affairs. She was the first woman to serve as the President of the National Assembly (2006–2011). On 10 January 2007, Flores swore Chávez into office following the 2006 presidential election.

From 2012 until the election of Maduro, she served as the Attorney General of Venezuela.

=== First Lady ===
Upon Maduro's victory in the 2013 presidential election over Henrique Capriles, Cilia Flores became Venezuela's First Lady, a position that had been vacant since 2003. As First Lady, Flores ran for a seat in the National Assembly in Venezuela's 2015 parliamentary elections as a candidate for the Great Patriotic Pole. She said she would use her seat to defend the social rights of citizens and the achievements of the Bolivarian Revolution.

In 2017, Flores was elected into the Constituent Assembly of Venezuela.

Flores reportedly placed relatives and loyalists in key positions within the state's legal system ensuring that major decisions were routed through her office. Critics note that under her influence the judiciary became politicized and did not issue a ruling against the state for over two decades. Zair Mundaray, a former senior prosecutor, stated that Flores is a "fundamental figure" in the nation's power structure and corruption.

According to a statement issued by Donald Trump, Flores was captured by the U.S. military alongside Maduro during the 2026 United States strikes in Venezuela. In January 2021, a federal indictment was unsealed charging Flores, Maduro, and their son with collaborating with drug traffickers. Flores and Maduro were captured and brought to the US to face these charges in January 2026.

=== Nepotism ===
Flores was accused of nepotism with individuals claiming that several of her close relatives became employees of the National Assembly while she was a deputy. According to Tal Cual, 16 relatives of Flores were in office while she was in the National Assembly. Flores responded to the reporters who shared the nepotism allegations stating it was part of a black campaign, calling them "mercenaries of the pen". Both opposition and members of the government denounced the alleged nepotism calling it an injustice, with one PSUV member taking the allegations to Venezuela's Ministry of Labour. In 2012, relatives of Flores were removed from office though some received other occupations in the government a year later.

In a 2013 interview with La Vanguardia, Flores defended the presence of her family members in government, stating, "My family got in based on their own merits... I am proud of them, and I will defend their work as many times as necessary."

According to journalist Maibort Petit, Flores' son, Walter Jacob Gavidia Flores, whose last salary through 2015 was less than $1,000, made multiple international trips in 2015 and 2016 on private flights costing approximately $20,000 per trip. Gavidia Flores spent most of his time in the United States, though he also took chartered flights to France, Germany, Malta and Spain.

=== Narcosobrinos incident ===
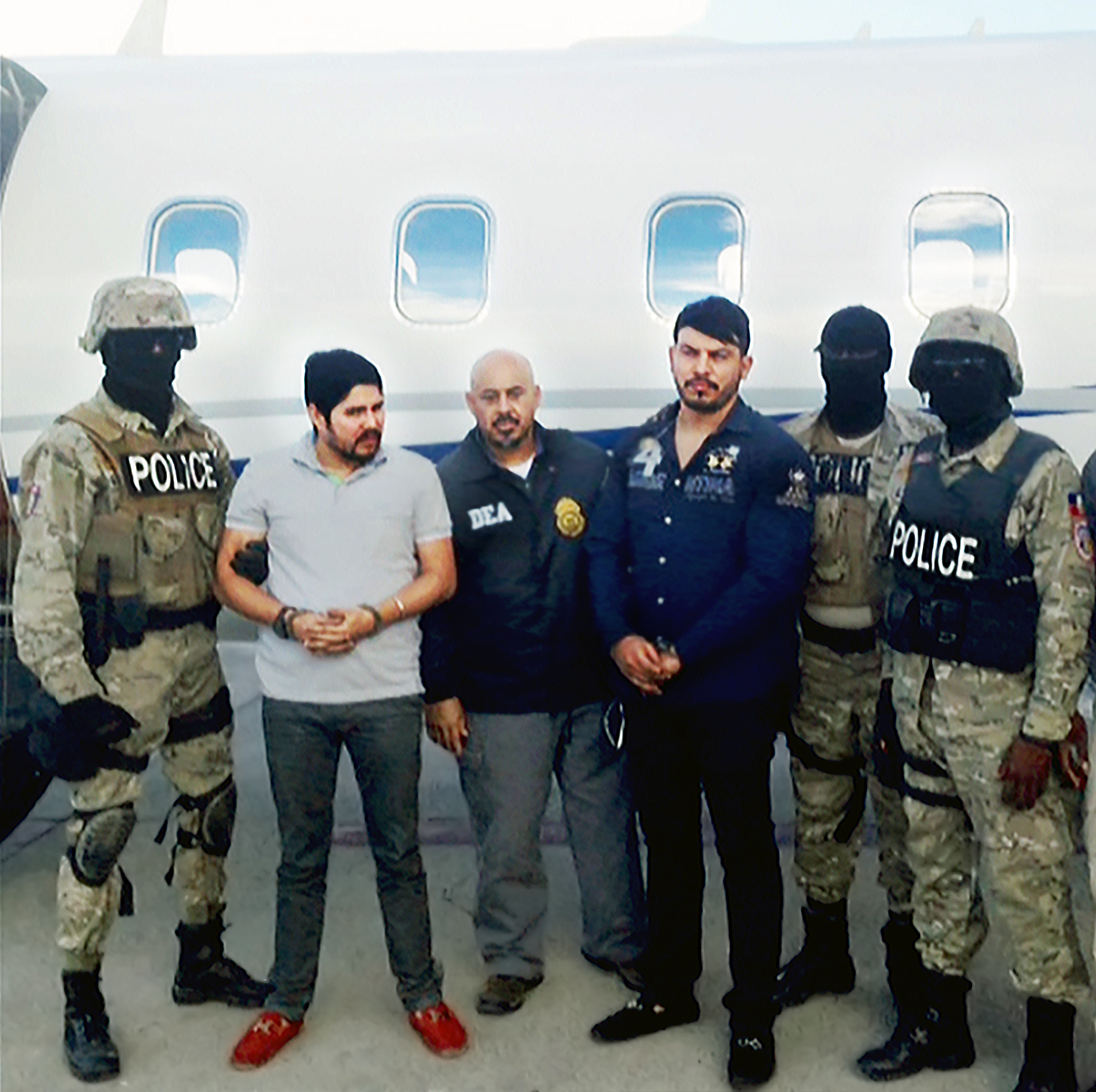
Efraín Antonio Campo Flores and Francisco Flores de Freitas after their arrest by the United States Drug Enforcement Administration on 10 November 2015

On 10 November 2015, two nephews of Cilia Flores, Efraín Antonio Campos Flores and Francisco Flores de Freitas, were arrested in Port-au-Prince, Haiti by local police while attempting to make a deal to transport 800 kilograms of cocaine destined for New York City and were turned over to the US Drug Enforcement Administration (DEA) where they were flown directly to the United States. Campos stated on the DEA plane that he was the step son of Ex-President Maduro and that he grew up in the Maduro household while being raised by Flores. The men traveled to Haiti with Venezuelan diplomatic passports but did not have diplomatic immunity according to former head of DEA international operations Michael Vigil. The two were previously monitored and filmed by the DEA between October and November 2015 after they contacted a DEA informant for advice on trafficking cocaine and brought a kilogram of cocaine to the informant to show its quality. The incident happened at a time when multiple high-ranking members of the Venezuelan government were being investigated for their involvement of drug trafficking.

On 18 November 2016, Flores' two nephews were found guilty of trying to ship drugs into the United States so they could "obtain a large amount of cash to help their family stay in power".

=== Sanctions ===
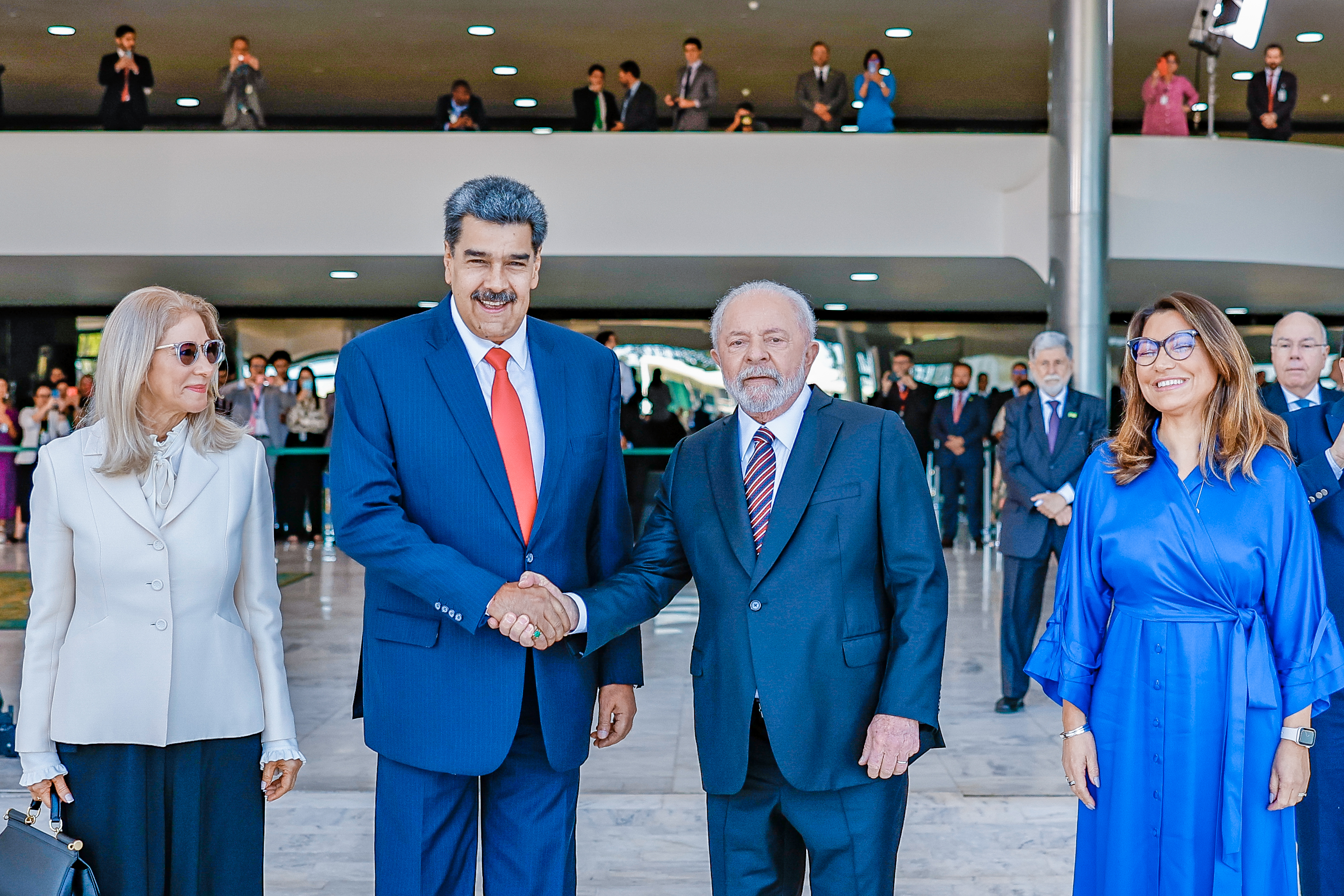
Maduro and Flores with Brazilian President Luiz Inácio Lula da Silva in Brasília, Brazil, 29 May 2023

Flores has been sanctioned by several countries and is banned from entering neighboring Colombia. The Colombian government maintains a list of people banned from entering Colombia or subject to expulsion; as of January 2019, the list had 200 people with a "close relationship and support for the Nicolás Maduro regime".

Responding to the May 2018 Venezuelan presidential election, Canada sanctioned 14 Venezuelans, including Flores, stating that the "economic, political and humanitarian crisis in Venezuela has continued to worsen as it moves ever closer to full dictatorship". The government said the 2018 presidential election was "illegitimate and anti-democratic", and sanctioned Flores, along with 13 other members of the ANC and TSJ.

On 27 March 2018, Panama sanctioned 55 public officials and 16 businesses that operate in Panama, related to the family of Flores. The sanctioned businesses have members of the Malpica-Flores family on their boards of directors. The companies, headed by various members of Flores' family and recently created, were sanctioned for allegedly laundering money.

The US Treasury Department seized a private jet and imposed sanctions on Maduro's inner circle in September 2018; Flores and top Maduro administration officials were sanctioned. Maduro responded to his wife's sanctions, saying: "You don't mess with Cilia. You don't mess with family. Don't be cowards! Her only crime [is] being my wife." The United States said the sanctions were a response to the "plundering" of Venezuela's resources.

== Capture and legal proceedings ==
Both Nicolás Maduro and Cilia Flores were captured by the United States on 3 January 2026. The couple were taken to New York to face trial.

On 5 January 2026, Flores and her husband were both arraigned, with each entering not guilty pleas to numerous drug trafficking charges. According to her lawyer, Mark Donnelly, she suffered "significant injuries during her abduction", including a fracture and heavy rib bruising. Flores wore a bandage on her forehead during the hearing.

After spending the first 3 months in total isolation of solitary confinement, Flores would be released to the general women prisoner population. While in general population she was exposed to pepper spray when guards used it to break up a fight amongst inmates in her cell block.

During the hearing, U.S. District Judge Alvin Hellerstein ordered Maduro to remain held until at least a 17 March hearing. This court appearance was later delayed to 26 March 2026. On 26 March 2026, she made her second court appearance, as scheduled, and afterwards was taken back to jail in Brooklyn. In September 2026, Flores requested a release from jail pending trial and stated that she had missed her monthly injection for a mitral valve prolapse since her incarceration and had developed a serious heart condition.. In addition in July 2026 Flores suffered a minor heart attack and her lawyers have claimed that she has not been given adequate medical treatment by the prison staff.

== Personal life ==
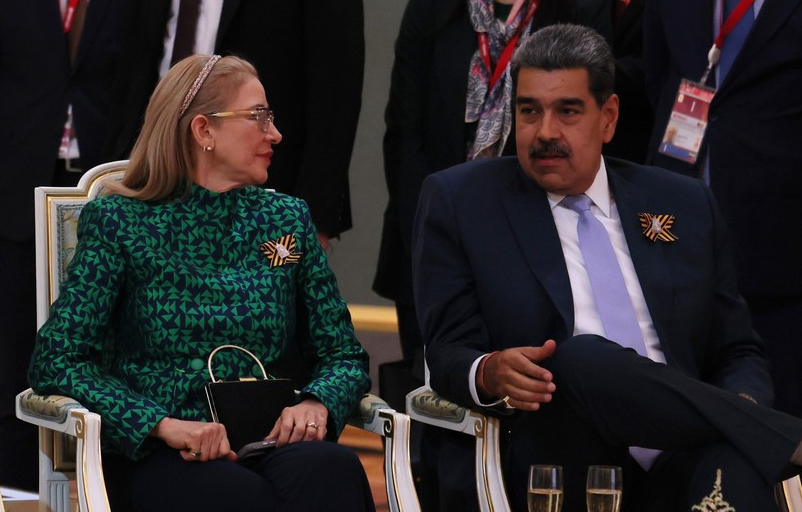
Maduro and Flores in Moscow, Russia on 8 May 2025

Flores’s first marriage was to Walter Ramón Gavidia, with whom she has three children. She then married President Nicolás Maduro, whom she replaced as President of the National Assembly in August 2006 when he resigned to become Minister of Foreign Affairs. The two had been in a romantic relationship since the 1990s when Flores was Hugo Chávez's lawyer following the 1992 Venezuelan coup d'état attempts and were married on 15 July 2013, months after Maduro became president.

Her husband Maduro has one son, Nicolás Maduro Guerra, whom he appointed to senior government posts: Chief of the presidency's Special Inspectors Body, head of the National Film School, and a seat in the 2017 Constituent National Assembly, while Flores has an adopted son, Efraín Antonio Campo Flores, who is her nephew (her deceased sister's son).

Investigative reports have linked the Flores family to vast, unexplained wealth, including the effective acquisition of an entire street of luxury homes in Caracas.

== See also ==
- List of first ladies of Venezuela

== Notes ==
Political offices
Preceded by Nicolás Maduro	President of the National Assembly of Venezuela; 2006–2011	Succeeded by Fernando Soto Rojas
Preceded by Carlos Escarrá	Attorney General of Venezuela; 2012–2013	Succeeded by Manuel Enrique Galindo
Honorary titles
Preceded by Marisabel Rodríguez de Chávez	First Lady of Venezuela; 2013–present	Incumbent
