= Children's Museum of Caracas =

Museum in Caracas, Venezuela

- Museo de los Niños de Caracas

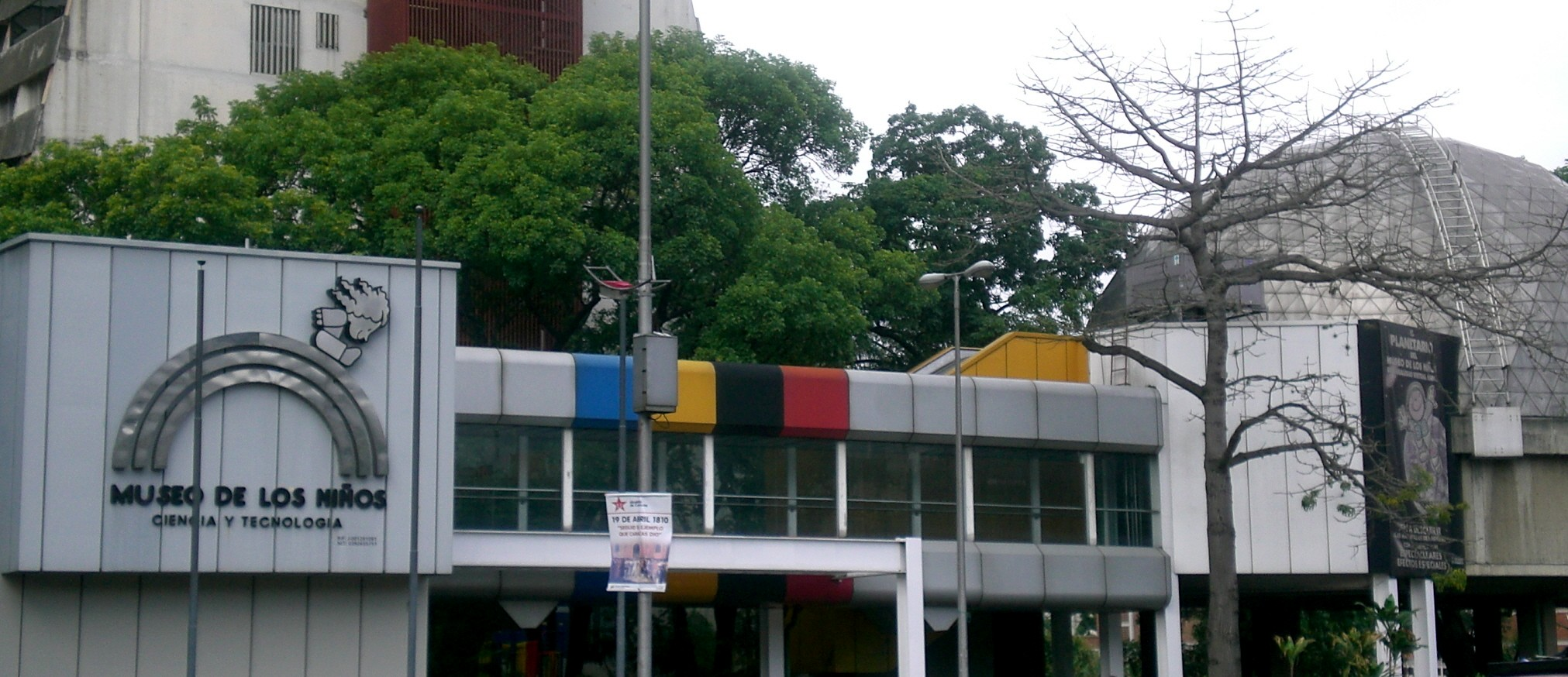
- Museum front entrance
- Established: 1982
- Location: Av. Bolívar, Complejo Urbanístico Parque Central; Nivel Bolívar frente al Paseo Vargas. Apdo. 14029. La Candelaria.Caracas, Venezuela
- Coordinates: 10.4982822°N 66.9020187°W
- Type: Children's museum
- Founder: Alicia Pietri
- Website: maravillosarealidad.com

The Children's Museum of Caracas (Spanish: Museo de los Niños de Caracas) is a museum in Caracas, Venezuela aimed at teaching children about science, technology, culture and arts. It was established by the former First Lady of Venezuela, Alicia Pietri de Caldera in 1982.

== See also ==
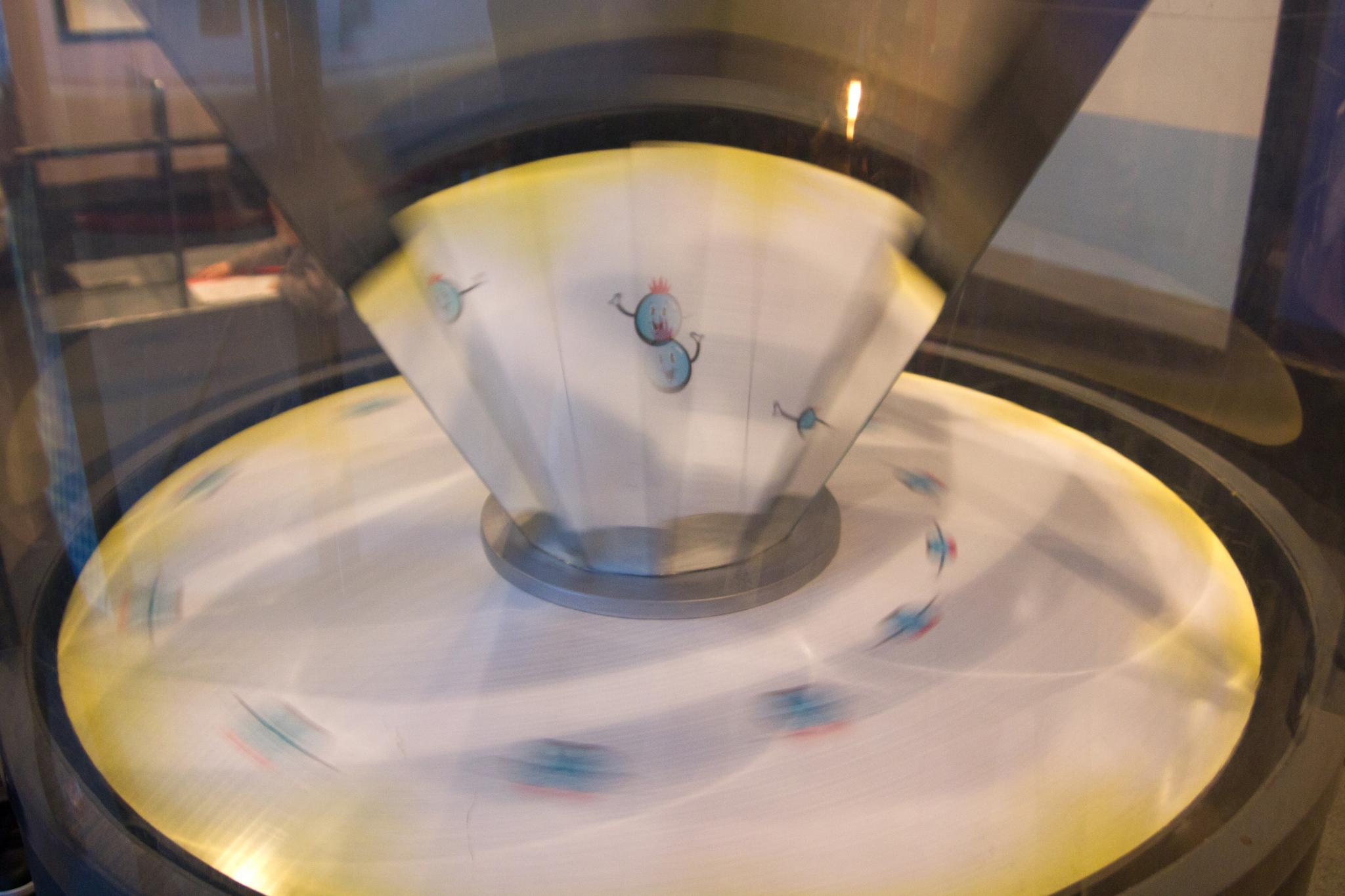
Part of the optics exhibit

- Sopotocientos
- List of museums in Venezuela
