= Blanca Rodríguez =

First Lady of Venezuela (1926–2020)

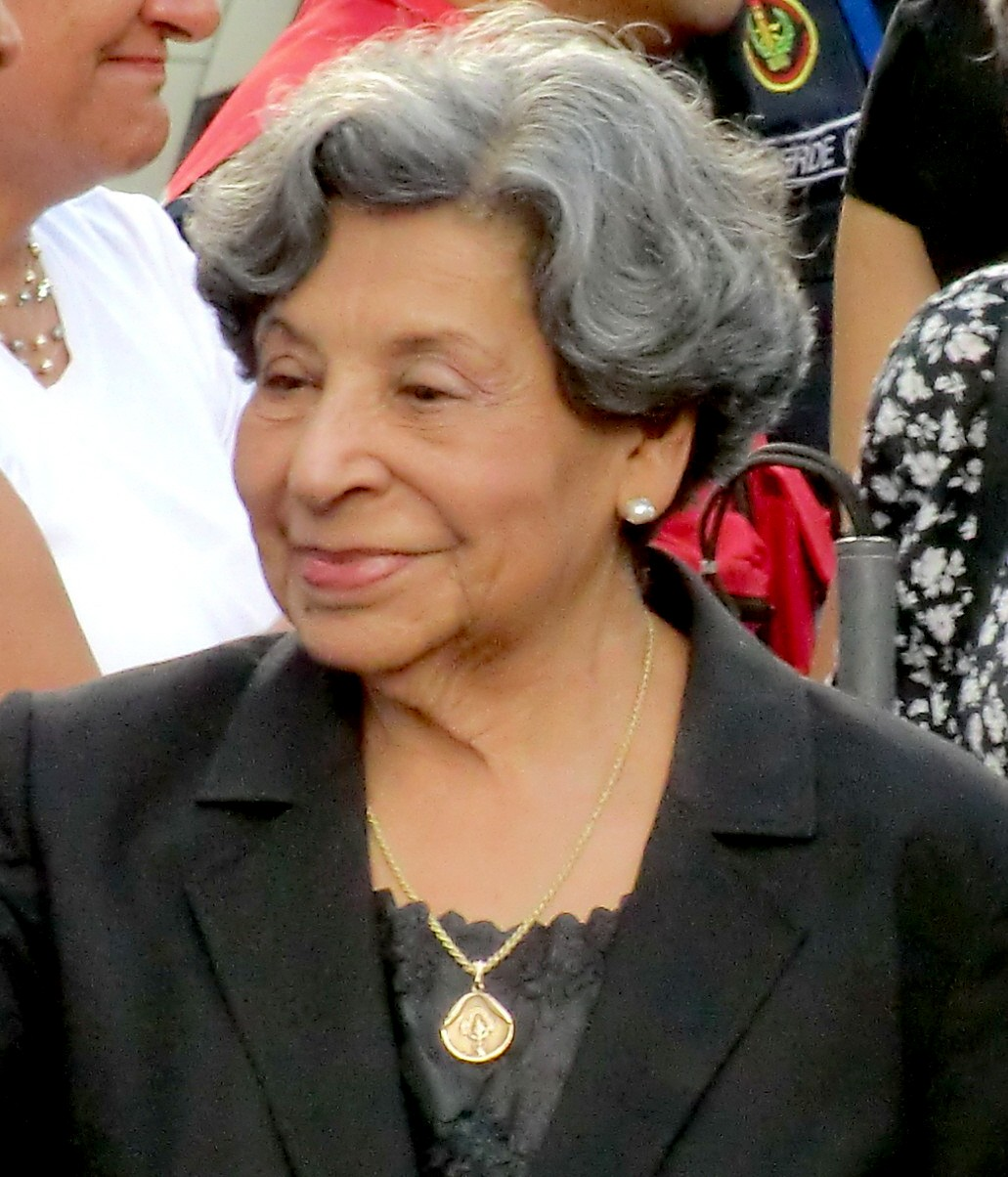
- Blanca Rodríguez during the burial of Carlos Andrés Pérez in Caracas (6 October 2011)

First Lady of Venezuela
- In role 2 February 1989 – 20 May 1993
- President: Carlos Andrés Pérez
- Preceded by: Gladys Castillo (1988)
- Succeeded by: Ligia Betancourt Mariño
- In role 12 March 1974 – 12 March 1979
- President: Carlos Andrés Pérez
- Preceded by: Alicia Pietri de Caldera
- Succeeded by: Betty Urdaneta de Herrera

Personal details
- Born: Blanca María Rodríguez de Pérez; 1 January 1926 Rubio, Venezuela
- Died: 5 August 2020 (aged 94) Caracas, Venezuela
- Spouse: Carlos Andrés Pérez (m. 1948; died 2010)
- Children: Sonia, Thais, Martha, Carlos Manuel, Maria de los Angeles, Maria Carolina

Blanca María Rodríguez de Pérez (January 1, 1926 – August 5, 2020) was the First Lady of Venezuela from 1974 to 1979 and again from 1989 to 1993.

== Biography ==
=== Early life and education ===
Blanca María Rodríguez was born in Rubio, Táchira State, the youngest of eight children to Manuel and Adela Rodríguez. Her grandfather, Eliodoro Rodríguez, was a prominent landowner in Rubio. Her father was also a coffee planter and a veteran of Colombia's Thousand Days War, in which he volunteered to fight on the side of the Liberal forces and acted as lieutenant to General Uribe. As a child, she was aware of her older cousin Carlos Andrés Pérez engaging in long political discussions with her father on topics as varied as the legacy of Simón Bolívar, the French Revolution and the dictatorship of Juan Vicente Gómez in Venezuela.

At the age of four, her mother died of cancer and Blanca's rearing was left in the hands of her older sister, Ana Isabel. Four years later, her father would also die. The family was financially ruined by the worldwide economic depression of the 1930s and all of the family haciendas had to be sold. She was educated by nuns at the Our Lady of the Rosary Convent School, where she graduated in 1944.

=== Marriage and exile ===
Carlos Andrés Pérez began courting his cousin Blanca in 1944. He was then working and living in Caracas and would travel to Rubio as he could to visit her. They were wed on 8 June 1948. For the first months, they lived in the provincial city of San Cristóbal, Táchira, but, moved to the Venezuelan capital to share a rented house with Julia Pérez, Blanca's mother-in-law.

A few months later, in November 1948, the military launched a coup against the democratically elected government of President Rómulo Gallegos and installed a dictatorship. Carlos Andrés Pérez became the target of harassment and persecution as a member of the Acción Democrática party. Blanca had to endure frequent security police searches of their home as well as tend to her young children while her husband was often on the run or in prison. In 1952, she followed him into exile in San José, Costa Rica.

The couple had six children, five daughters, Sonia, Thais, Martha, María de los Ángeles and María Carolina, and a son, Carlos Manuel.

When the dictatorship of Marcos Pérez Jiménez was overthrown in 1958, Blanca and Carlos Andrés Pérez returned to Venezuela with the children. Her husband's ascendant political career resulted in Blanca's increasingly prominent role as a politician's wife, one who would be actively involved in supporting his career, campaigning and developing her own charitable activities.

=== First Lady ===
With Carlos Andrés Pérez's election to the Presidency in December 1973, Blanca Rodríguez assumed the role of First Lady. In Venezuela, this involved acting as the head of the Children's Foundation, a charitable organisation that organised summer camps and festivals for disadvantaged children. Blanca was eager to develop a program that would have a greater impact on the lives of the poor and would provide year-round assistance. One of the most important aspects of her legacy as First Lady was the development of a network of daycare centres (hogares de cuidado diario) for low income communities across the country. These centres were created to enable working, and often single, mothers to earn a wage without leaving their children in the hands of unsuitable caretakers. The emphasis of the daycare centre program was on grass-roots involvement. Community mothers were consulted in the selection and vetting of caretakers and the Foundation provided financial support to the "mother-carers", as the women in charge of the centres were identified.

In addition, Blanca Rodríguez accompanied her husband on his frequent trips abroad to meet world leaders, including memorable visits to Mexico, Egypt, Russia and Iran. She also hosted the visits of the King Juan Carlos I and Queen Sofía, U.S. President Jimmy Carter and wife U.S. First LadyRosalynn Carter to Caracas as well as Canadian Prime Minister Pierre Trudeau and his wife Margaret Trudeau. Margaret Trudeau used the occasion to sing a song that she had written to honor Rodríguez.

=== After the presidency ===
After Carlos Andrés Pérez left the presidency in 1979, Blanca Rodríguez devoted her energies to supporting a charitable foundation, Bandesir, focused on providing wheelchairs and crutches to the disabled poor. She became Bandesir's chairwoman and pursued an active schedule of visits around the country to attend the frequent ceremonies the foundation organized to hand over wheelchairs to people who could not afford them. She also fundraised for Bandesir and extended its remit so that it could also provide cheap or free medical attention to the needy who came to its headquarters. She was also a patron of the Leper Hospice in La Guaira.

=== Second term as First Lady ===
Blanca Rodríguez again became First Lady upon her husband's second election to the Presidency in 1988. She resumed her position at the Children's Foundation. Under her leadership, the foundation supported the government's initiative to roll out the daycare centre programme all over the country as part of its welfare provision.

During the military coup organized by Hugo Chávez on 4 February 1992, Blanca, her daughters and granddaughters were in residence at the Presidential palace of La Casona whilst it was besieged by rebel forces. While her husband managed to escape and quell the coup attempt, Blanca remained at La Casona during the particularly heavy attack. She later made sure to assist in the tending of wounded soldiers, regardless of their allegiance, and was crucial in keeping morale up during the few hours when it seemed the residence was going to be taken.

=== Later life ===
After leaving office, Blanca Rodríguez retired to her home in the outskirts of Caracas, a house she designed to resemble one of her father's haciendas. She continued to devote time to charitable work, mainly in relation to the Bandesir foundation. Whilst Carlos Andrés Pérez had been self-exiled since 1998, Blanca Rodríguez remained in the country.

In 2004, government security forces raided Blanca Rodríguez's house with the excuse of finding weapons and documents related to an anti-Chávez conspiracy, a charge that was clearly seen as baseless given that she had not seen or spoken to her estranged husband since he left the country. In keeping with her deep Catholic faith, attempts by Pérez to divorce her were rebuffed by her lawyers and the couple was still legally married at the time of Perez's death in late 2010.

== Death ==
Blanca Rodriguez died on August 5, 2020, at the age of 94.

== See also ==
- List of first ladies of Venezuela
- Presidents of Venezuela
- 1992 Venezuelan coup d'état attempts

Honorary titles
Preceded by Alicia Pietri de Caldera	First Lady of Venezuela; 1974 –1979	Succeeded by Betty Urdaneta de Herrera
Preceded by Gladys Castillo	First Lady of Venezuela; 1989–1993	Succeeded by Ligia Betancourt Mariño
