= Gladys Castillo =

Venezuelan pediatrician and social activist (died 2021)

First Lady of Venezuela
- In office February 2, 1984 – April 1988
- President: Jaime Lusinchi
- Preceded by: Betty Urdaneta
- Succeeded by: Blanca Rodríguez

Personal details
- Born: Gladys Teresa Castillo Cardier; 1922 or 1923
- Died: 25 March 2021 (aged 98) Venezuela
- Spouse: Jaime Lusinchi (m. 1941; div. 1988)
- Children: Five
- Occupation: Pediatrician

Gladys Teresa Castillo Cardier (14 July 1922 – 25 March 2021) was a Venezuelan pediatrician and social activist. She was the First Lady of Venezuela from 1984 until her divorce from President Jaime Lusinchi in 1988. Lusinchi's controversial divorce from First Lady Castillo, in favor of his mistress and private secretary Blanca Ibáñez, was a major public and political scandal during his presidency.

== Biography ==
Castillo was a longtime, practicing pediatrician.

She was introduced to her future husband, Jaime Lusinchi, by mutual friends while attending a sports tournament in Aragua de Barcelona. They talked about different books that both were reading at the time. The couple gradually began dating and married in 1941. Castillo and Lusinchi had five children - two sons and three daughters.

They remained married for more than 40 years, although the latter years of the marriage proved difficult for Castillo due to her husband's affair. Castillo effectively separated from Lusinchi, but remained married due to her family and potential consequences for Lusinschi's political career. Their marriage was already failing prior to Lusinchi's presidency. According to Castillo, this placed her in a "very difficult situation" even before she became first lady.

Jamie Lusinchi was elected president in 1983. Shortly after taking office, Lusinchi appointed his mistress, Blanca Ibáñez, as the "private secretary" of the Presidency in February 1984. This designation sparked many reactions in public opinion. Many of her critics said that Ibáñez had a high degree of discretional power inside the government.

Castillo confessed that she never felt comfortable in her role as Venezuela's first lady. In a 1988 interview with journalist Nelson Hippolyte, she compared being the president's wife to being locked up and "not being able to do the things she wanted". Despite this, Castillo focused on social programs, charitable causes, and children's health care during her tenure as first lady. She tried to introduce a number of new social welfare and health initiatives, especially for children. However, her plans failed to receive any support from President Jaime Lusinchi or his government. For example, Castillo proposed several new preventative dental clinics throughout Caracas, but her plan was not approved. She expressed her frustrations in the interview with Nelson Hippolyte, which were later published in the book, La Pregunta y sus Víctimas', "In this role as first lady I have been able to do many things for my profession as a doctor-pediatrician, but I have not had the support...I wanted to build a big recreational park for the family and they didn't give me permission either."

President Lusinchi filed for divorce while still in office, "citing voluntary abandonment of the home" by Castillo. First Lady Castillo criticized her husband's actions and refused to move out of the La Casona presidential palace during the divorce proceedings. The divorce, initiated by Lusinchi, was granted in April 1988 by the Seventh Civil Court of Caracas with unusual speed. Castillo rebuked Lusinchi following the ruling, saying, "If anyone has committed abandonment and serious insults, it has not been me."

Reaction against President Lusinchi was swift and overwhelmingly negative. Public opinion turned against the president. The Catholic Church, led by Mérida Archbishop Miguel Antonio Salas, harshly condemned Lusinchi and the speed of his divorce, writing, "With consternation and astonishment, we have learned from the press of the divorce decree of the presidential couple" and called it "...a bad example by the national magistrate which has dealt a severe blow to the family institution in Venezuela." The bishops noted that the presidential divorce scandal was a first in Venezuelan history.

For her part, Castillo later expressed relief to be free from her husband's infidelity. By 1988, she had privately concluded that the end of her marriage would not harm her family or her children.

Gladys Castillo died on 25 March 2021, at the age of 98.
