= Alicia Pietri =

First Lady of Venezuela

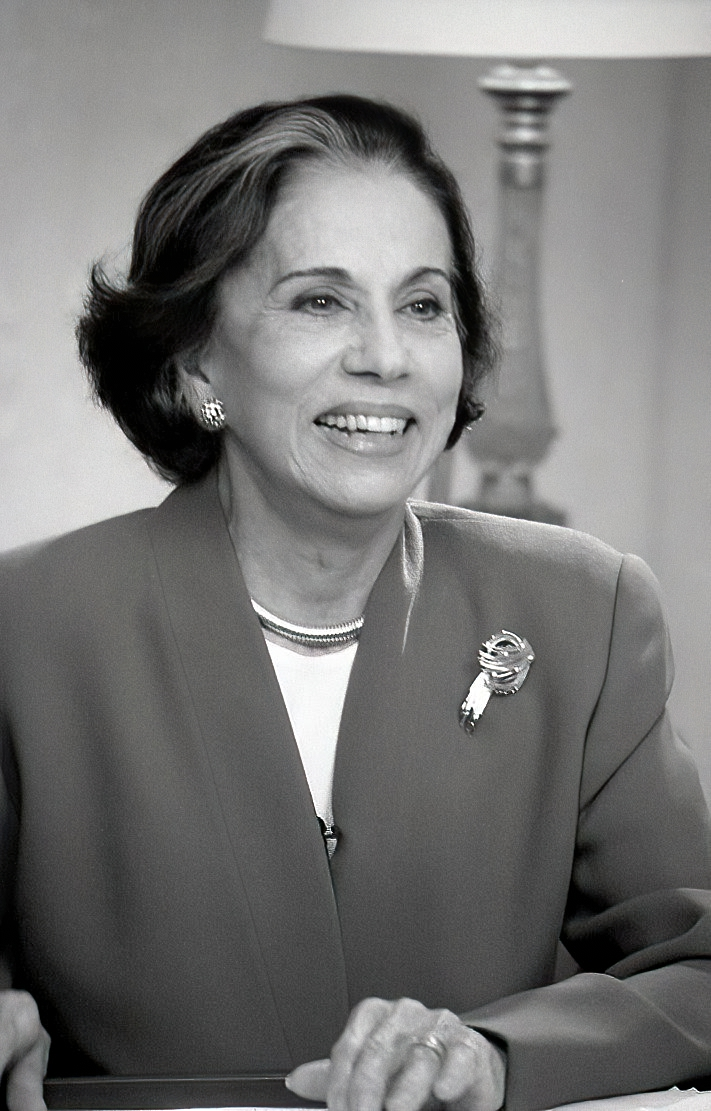

First Lady of Venezuela
- In office 12 March 1969 – 12 March 1974
- President: Rafael Caldera
- Preceded by: Carmen América Fernández
- Succeeded by: Blanca Rodríguez
- In role 2 February 1994 – 2 February 1999
- Preceded by: Ligia Betancourt
- Succeeded by: Marisabel Rodríguez

Personal details
- Born: Alicia Pietri Montemayor; 14 October 1923 Caracas, Venezuela
- Died: 9 February 2011 (aged 87) Caracas, Venezuela
- Party: Copei
- Spouse: Rafael Caldera
- Children: 6
- Parent(s): Andrés Pietri Méndez (father); Luisa Teresa de Montemayor Núñez (mother)
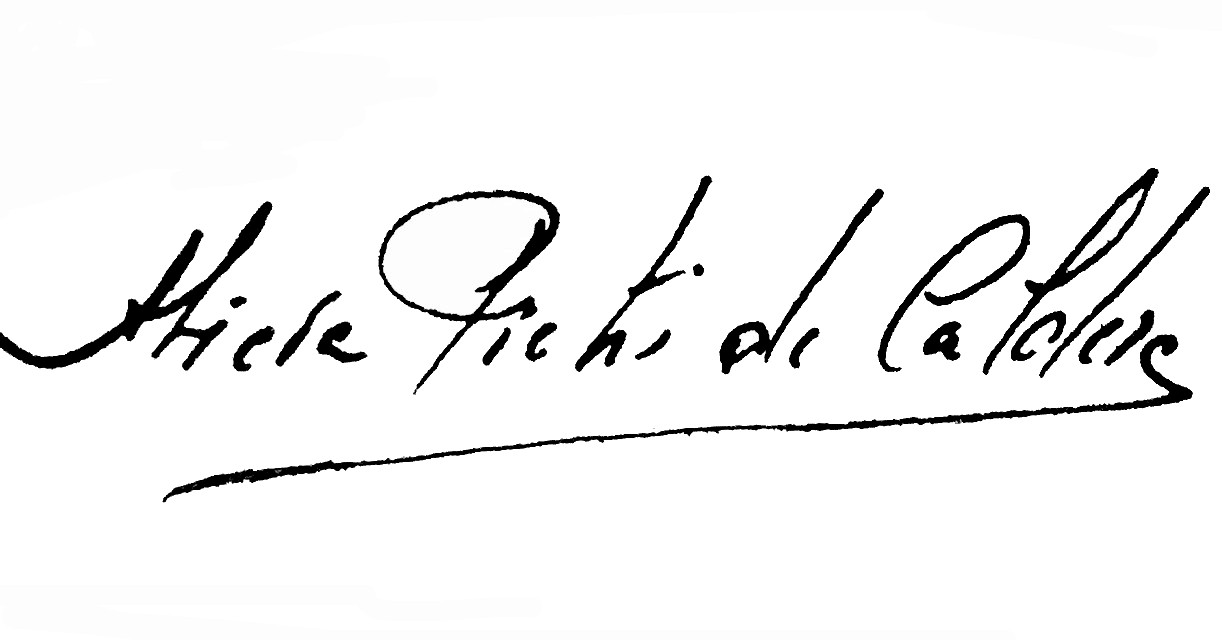
- Signature

Alicia Pietri Montemayor (14 October 1923 – 9 February 2011) was a public figure in Venezuela who twice served as First Lady of Venezuela (1969–1974 and 1994–1999) as the wife of Venezuelan president Rafael Caldera. She was the founder of the Children's Museum of Caracas. She served as president of the Children’s Foundation in Venezuela, and was also involved in other organizations dedicated to childcare.

== Early life ==
Alicia Pietri de Montemayor was born in Caracas on October 14, 1923. She was the daughter of Luisa Teresa de Montemayor Núñez and Dr. Andrés Pietri Méndez, an otorhinolaryngologist and the founder of the Simón Rodríguez Benevolent Institute. She was the great-niece of General Juan Pietri Pietri, a key figure in the government of Joaquín Crespo. She was also the niece of Luis Gerónimo Pietri Méndez, who held the positions of Minister of the Interior and Governor of the Federal District during the governments of Eleazar López Contreras and Isaías Medina Angarita. Furthermore, she was a cousin of the writer and politician Arturo Uslar Pietri.

Alicia's great-grandparents, Andrés Antonio Pietri Bonifacio and Catalina Pietri de Franceschi, originally from the island of Corsica, settled in Río Caribe, Sucre State, where they had seven children and many grandchildren. She eventually advanced to study under the renowned harpist Nicanor Zabaleta and even performed at the Teatro Municipal.

== First Lady (1969–1974) ==
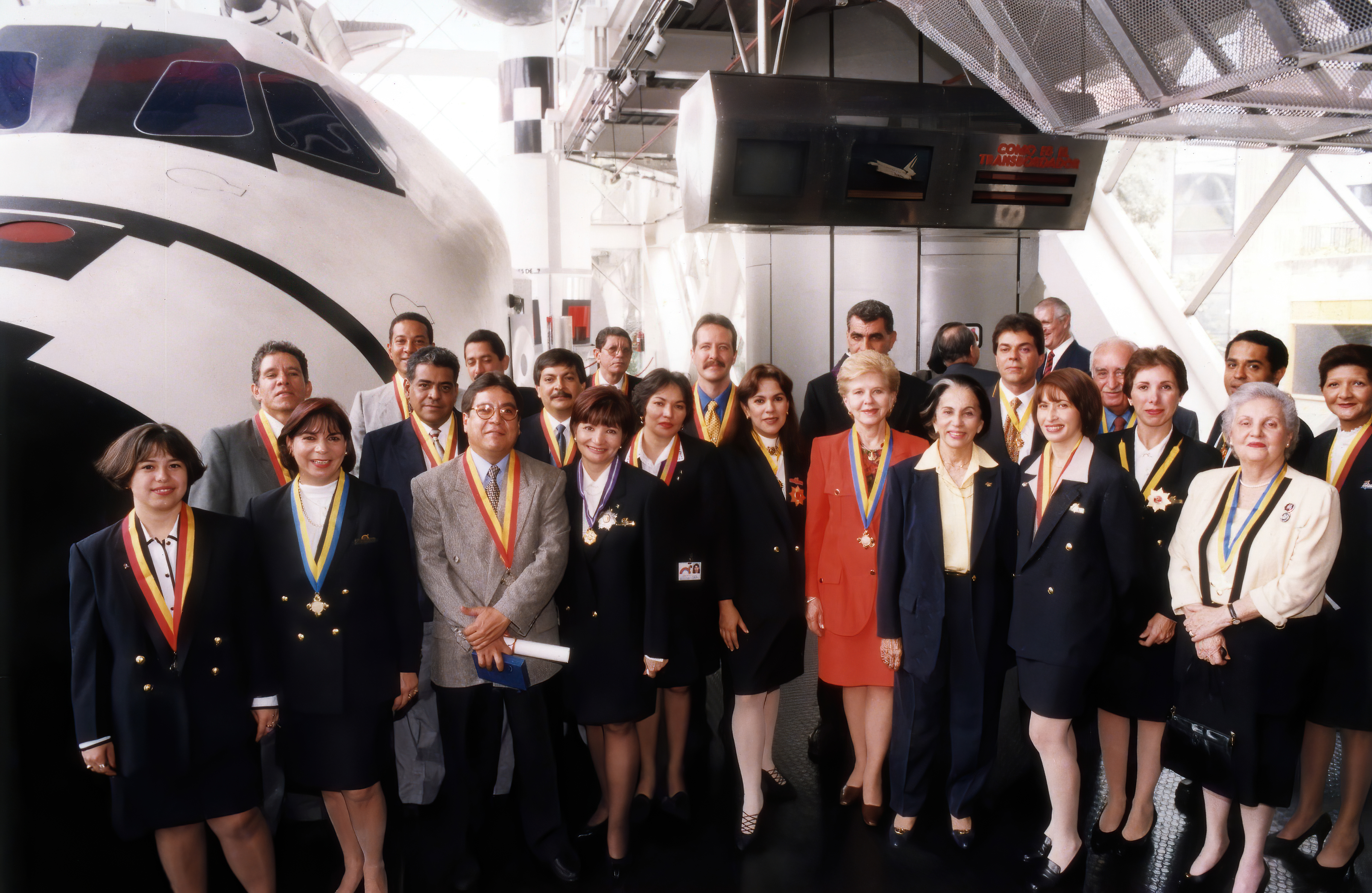
Alicia Pietri and her team at the Children's Museum in the late 1990s.

Upon her husband's victory in the 1968 Venezuelan general election and her role as First Lady, she continued the work initiated by her predecessor, Carmen América Fernández Alcalá, in the presidency of the Children's Festival Foundation. She maintained and improved existing programs such as "Children's Day" and the "Song Festival" while introducing new initiatives. These included the "Vacation Plan", which rewarded the top-performing students from public schools during school holidays by taking them to explore different regions of the country. Other additions were the "Week of Art and Culture for Children", the "Pages for Imagination" editions, "Pocket Parks", and the educational television program Sopotocientos, among others.

Alicia Pietri was a passionate advocate for children's recreation, which she strongly linked to a child's right to enjoy their childhood. She believed this right was even more crucial for underprivileged children because recreation helped to free their spirits from bitterness and resentment, which could be harmful not only to society but also to their well-being.

Among her achievements were the establishment of miniature baseball fields for children, the publication of a Braille version of Oscar Delepiani's cuatro (a Venezuelan musical instrument) manual, and the management of an extensive donation program from her Office of Social Welfare, located in the White Palace next to Miraflores Palace. This office handled an average of two thousand requests each month.

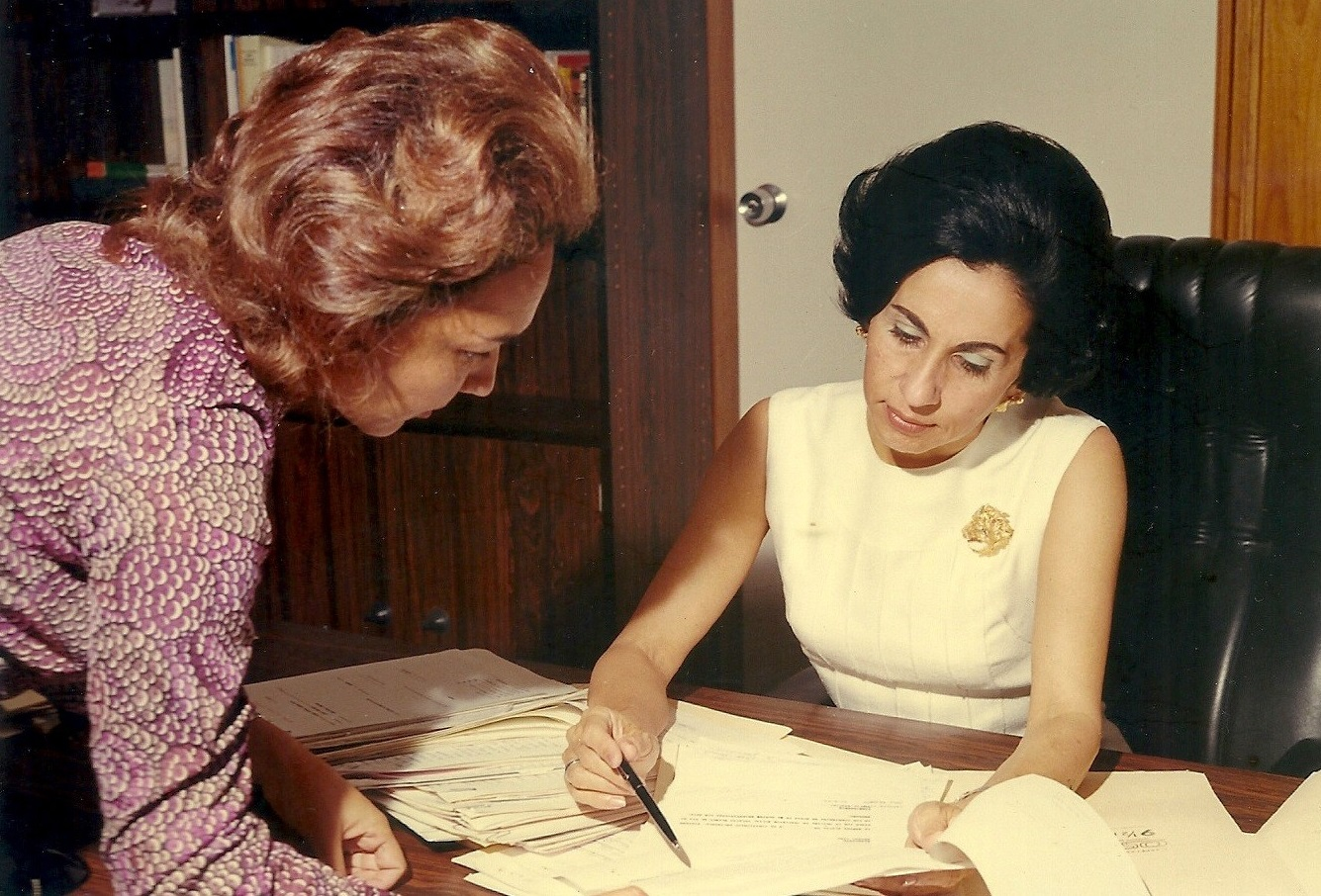
Alicia Pietri, together with Evelia Serrano, in the Social Welfare Office of the White Palace.

During that period, she held honorary presidencies in various organizations, including the Bolivarian Foundation, the Venezuelan Women's Association, the Elderly Protection Association, the Girl Guides Association of Venezuela, the American Home Foundation, the Youth Association of Venezuela, the Ladies' Committee of the Military Circle, and served as an honorary Raksha (Scout leader) for the Wolf Cubs Branch of the Scouts Association of Venezuela, among others. She inaugurated the public opening of the presidential residence, La Casona, for the first time. Through guided tours, thousands of people from educational institutions and the general public could explore its facilities and learn about its artistic and pictorial heritage.

At the end of her tenure as First Lady in 1974, Alicia Pietri undertook the task of establishing and developing the Children's Museum of Caracas. The museum's primary aim was to enhance basic education through interactive and playful learning. The museum became a trailblazer in Latin America and served as a mentor for similar institutions established later in the region, including in Colombia, Argentina, Mexico, and Puerto Rico.

== First Lady: Second Time (1994–1999) ==
In December 1993, Rafael Caldera was re-elected as President, and Alicia Pietri, now in her seventies, had to return to La Casona. The official residence still bore the scars of the 1992 coup attempts.

Her task was to lead the process of renovating and restoring the presidential residence and its artistic heritage. Once again, she opened its doors to the public, organizing weekly guided tours. Additionally, she initiated the "A Fondness for My City" program, a public-private partnership aimed at revitalizing green spaces and public squares in Caracas. One of the most notable achievements of this program was the "Esfera Caracas" (Caracas Sphere) by the artist Jesús Soto, which was inaugurated on December 8, 1996, along the Francisco Fajardo Highway, near Parque del Este.

On May 8, 1995, in Rome, Alicia Pietri was awarded the "Woman for Peace" distinction by the Together for Peace Foundation, presided over by Mariapía Fanfani.

On September 20, 1996, she was granted the Royal Order of Isabella the Catholic by the Kingdom of Spain. On November 8 and 9, 1997, she served as the host to the spouses of the heads of state at the VII Ibero-American Summit, held on Margarita Island.

== Final years ==
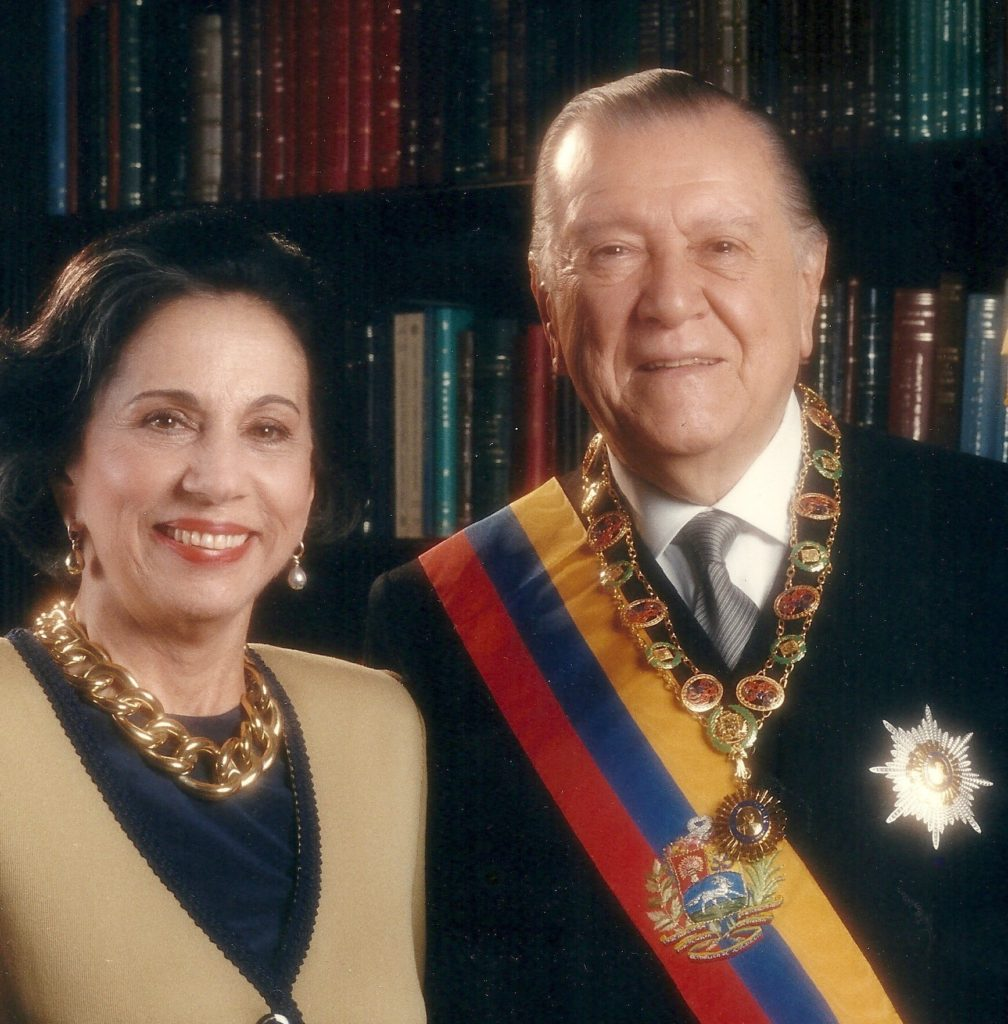
Presidential couple

At the end of her husband's second term on February 2, 1999, Alicia Pietri withdrew from public life and returned to her home in Tinajero, located in the Los Chorros neighborhood of Caracas. She continued to oversee the Children's Museum, gradually relinquishing control to her daughter, Mireya, due to the progressive advancement of Alzheimer's disease. She died in her home in the early hours of Wednesday, February 9, 2011. The National Assembly observed a minute of silence in her honor. Her son, Andrés, who bid farewell to her remains at her gravesite, expressed gratitude for the widespread and positive response from the Venezuelan community following her death: "It has been touching for us, and we want to publicly express our gratitude at this moment for the overwhelmingly positive and unanimous demonstration of our entire country, regardless of ideological positions, through all media and social strata upon her passing..."

Shy, discreet, and conservative, according to her close friends, she was not a first lady who enjoyed being in the media limelight. Instead, she tirelessly advocated for the rights of the most underprivileged children," states the biographical review found in the book "200 Venezuelan Educators: 18th to 21st Centuries" (2016), published by the Empresas Polar Foundation and Andrés Bello Catholic University.

== Personal life ==
Alicia Pietri Montemayor was born on October 14, 1923. She married Rafael Caldera on 6 August 1941. The couple had six children: Mireya, Rafael Tomás, Juan José, Alicia Helena, Cecilia and Andrés. Juan José Caldera (born 1948). Her husband died on December 24, 2009, after struggling for several years with Parkinson’s Disease.

== See also ==
- List of first ladies of Venezuela
- Children's Museum of Caracas

Honorary titles
Preceded by Carmen América Fernández	First Lady of Venezuela; 1969–1974	Succeeded by Blanca Rodríguez
Preceded by Ligia Betancourt	First Lady of Venezuela; 1994–1999	Succeeded by Marisabel Rodríguez
