= La Casona =

Former presidential residence in Caracas, Venezuela

Coordinates: 10°29′15″N 66°50′02″W

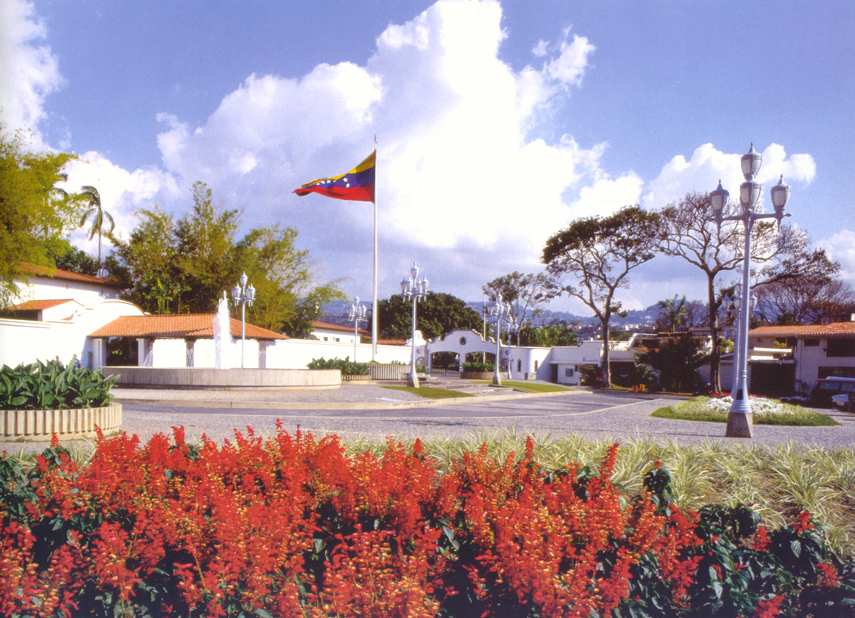
- Main entrance
- Interactive map of the La Casona area

General information
- Architectural style: Spanish Colonial
- Location: Central Avenue, between Street 1 and Street 2, Leoncio Martínez Parish, Sucre Municipality, Miranda State
- Current tenants: President of Venezuela
- Completed: 1964
- Opened: 1964
- Owner: Government of Venezuela

La Casona (Spanish: La Casona, lit. 'Big House'), since 13 December 2019 the headquarters of the Centro Cultural Aquiles Nazoa in La Carlota neighborhood of Caracas, was the official residence of the president of Venezuela from 1966 to 2012. Miraflores Palace replaced La Casona as the official residence, although some official government events and ceremonies are still held at La Casona.

== Geography ==
The area of the complex is about 5 hectares (12 acres), and is located in La Carlota neighborhood, in the east of Caracas. Nearby sites include Parque del Este, Parque Bolívar, and Generalissimo Francisco de Miranda Air Base. It is administratively part of Sucre Municipality in Miranda State.

== History ==
La Casona was originally a plantation for sugarcane (Saccharum officinarum) during the colonial era. When the state acquired the property in 1964, it was owned by the Brandt family. After acquisition, it was renovated and expanded into a grand mansion with Spanish Colonial architecture.

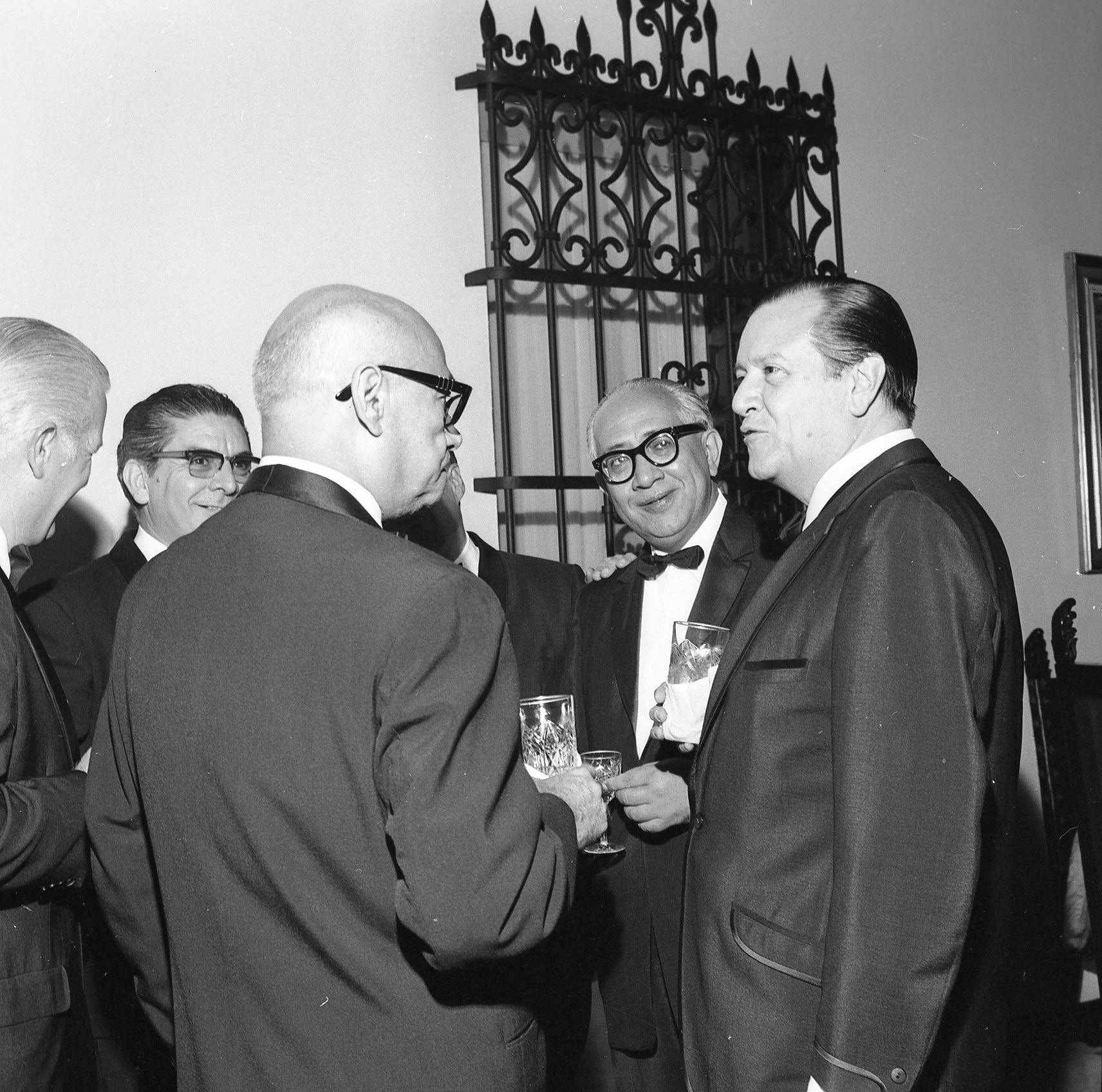
On 25 March 1969, incoming President Rafael Caldera met with outgoing president Raúl Leoni at a gala dinner at La Casona.

In 1966, the building became the official residence of the president of Venezuela by the decision of then-president Raúl Leoni. During the first Caldera administration, the residence underwent remodeling based on preferences from first lady Alicia Pietri.

In 1988, then-president Jaime Lusinchi temporarily changed his residence to the Miraflores Palace while first lady Gladys Castillo remained at La Casona during the couple's divorce proceedings.

Hugo Chávez was the last leader to reside in La Casona, who lived here from 1999 to 2002.

In 2013, new president Nicolás Maduro decided to move into "La Viñeta", the residence for the vice president instead of La Casona. Then in 2019, Maduro opened the residence to the public as the Aquiles Nazoa Cultural Center, which is a museum and cultural space that preserves the residence's spaces and gardens as they appeared during the years it served as a residence. The complex is also sometimes used for official government events.

== See also ==
- Miraflores Palace
- First lady of Venezuela
- Palacio Federal Legislativo
