= Marisabel Rodríguez de Chávez =

First Lady of Venezuela

Marisabel Rodríguez
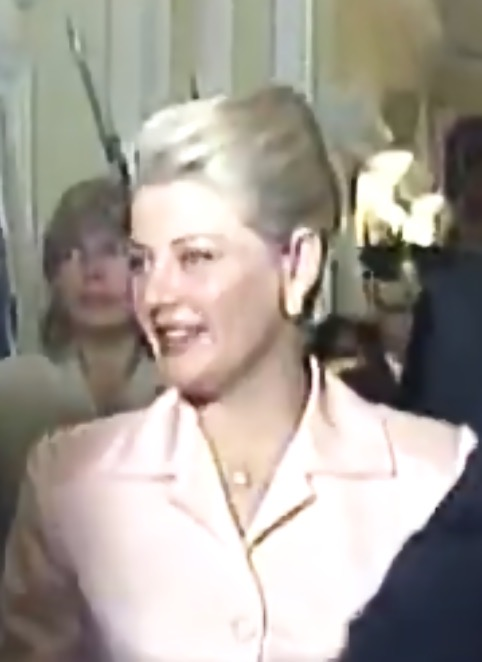
- Rodríguez de Chávez in 1999

First Lady of Venezuela
- In role 2 February 1999 – 13 August 2004
- President: Hugo Chávez
- Preceded by: Alicia Pietri Montemayor
- Succeeded by: Cilia Flores

Personal details
- Born: 23 November 1964 (age 61) Barquisimeto, Lara, Venezuela
- Party: PODEMOS
- Other party: MVR (formerly)
- Spouses: Allessandro Lanaro Perez (Div.); Hugo Chávez (m. 1997; div. 2004): Felix Garcia (Div.)
- Children: 2
- Parent(s): Vicente Rodríguez; María Oropeza
- Profession: Journalist

Marisabel Rodríguez Oropeza (born 23 November 1964) is a Venezuelan journalist, publicist and radio announcer. She was the second wife of former Venezuelan president Hugo Chávez.

== Early life ==
Rodríguez was born in Barquisimeto.

== Career ==
=== Politics ===
In 1999, Rodríguez was elected a member of the 1999 Constituent Assembly of Venezuela, which wrote the present Constitution of Venezuela. She was elected with the second highest margin in the elections. She was then elected president of the Constituent Social Rights Commission and president of the Fundación del Niño, a state-funded foundation that works helping and supporting children throughout the country.

=== Television and radio ===
Rodríguez is an announcer and radio producer. She produced a magazine for children, "El Club de los Exploradores". She has anchored for television stations including Telecentro and Niños Cantores Televisión in her hometown of Barquisimeto. She has also produced the radio program "Líder en la Noticia".

== Personal life ==
Her first marriage was to Allessandro Lanaro Pérez.

She married Hugo Chávez in 1997. In 2004 she and Chávez officially divorced, after two years of separation. In 2007, she publicly denounced the constitutional reforms proposed by Chávez.

She divorced her third husband, tennis instructor Félix Lisandro García, in 2009.

She has two children: Raúl Alfonzo Ramírez Rodríguez (1990), with César Antonio Ramírez Vidal (1960) and Rosinés Chávez Rodríguez (1997), with Hugo Chávez. She also has two grandchildren: Martina Ramírez Ramos, born on December 21, 2017, and Damián Ramírez Ramos, born on May 14, 2019 (Raúl's children with his wife Carla Alejandra Ramos Arráez).

== See also ==
- List of first ladies of Venezuela

Honorary titles
Preceded by Alicia Pietri de Caldera	First Lady of Venezuela; 1999–2003	Succeeded by Cilia Flores
