= Miraflores Palace =

Official residence of the President of Venezuela

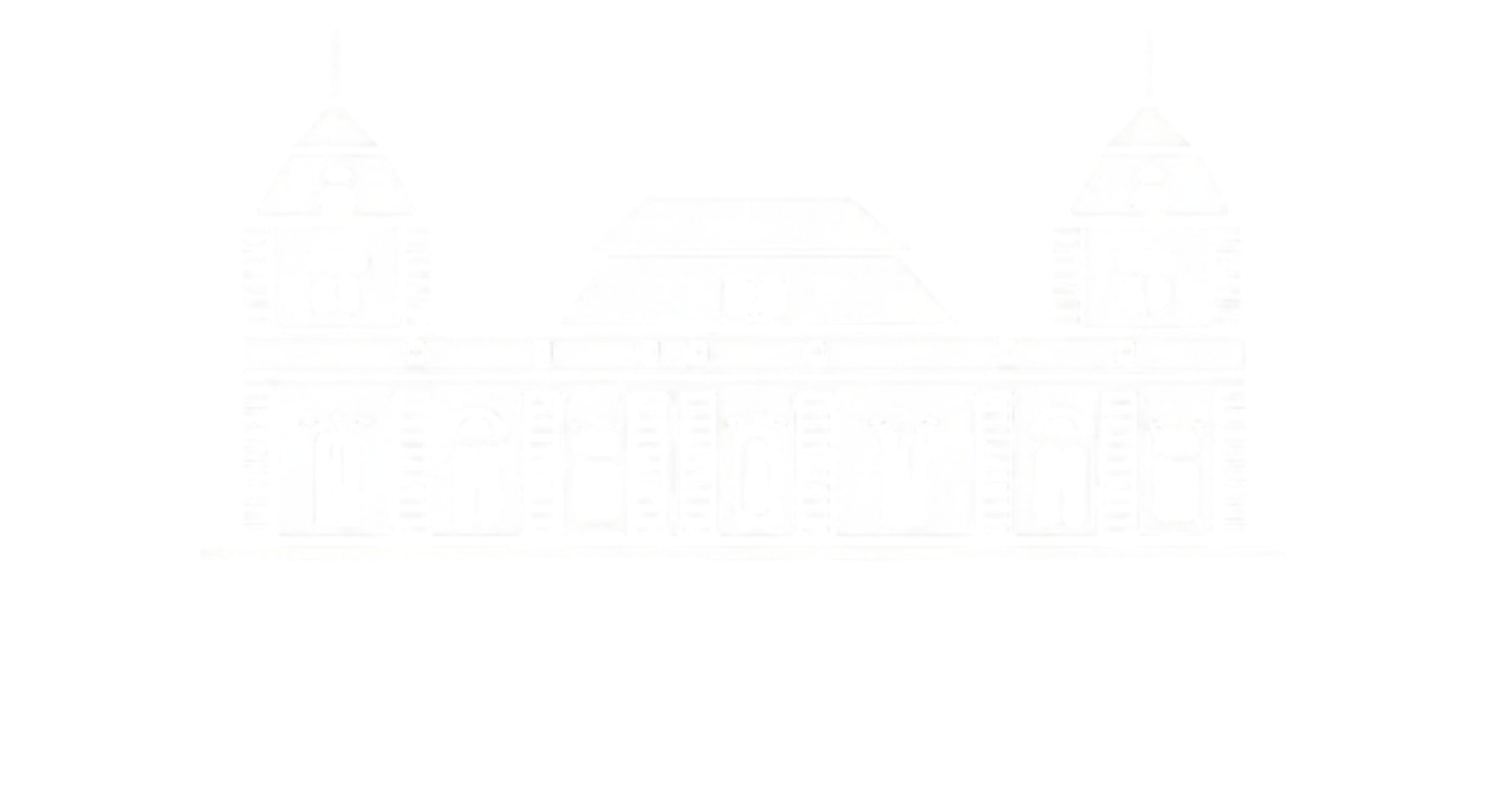

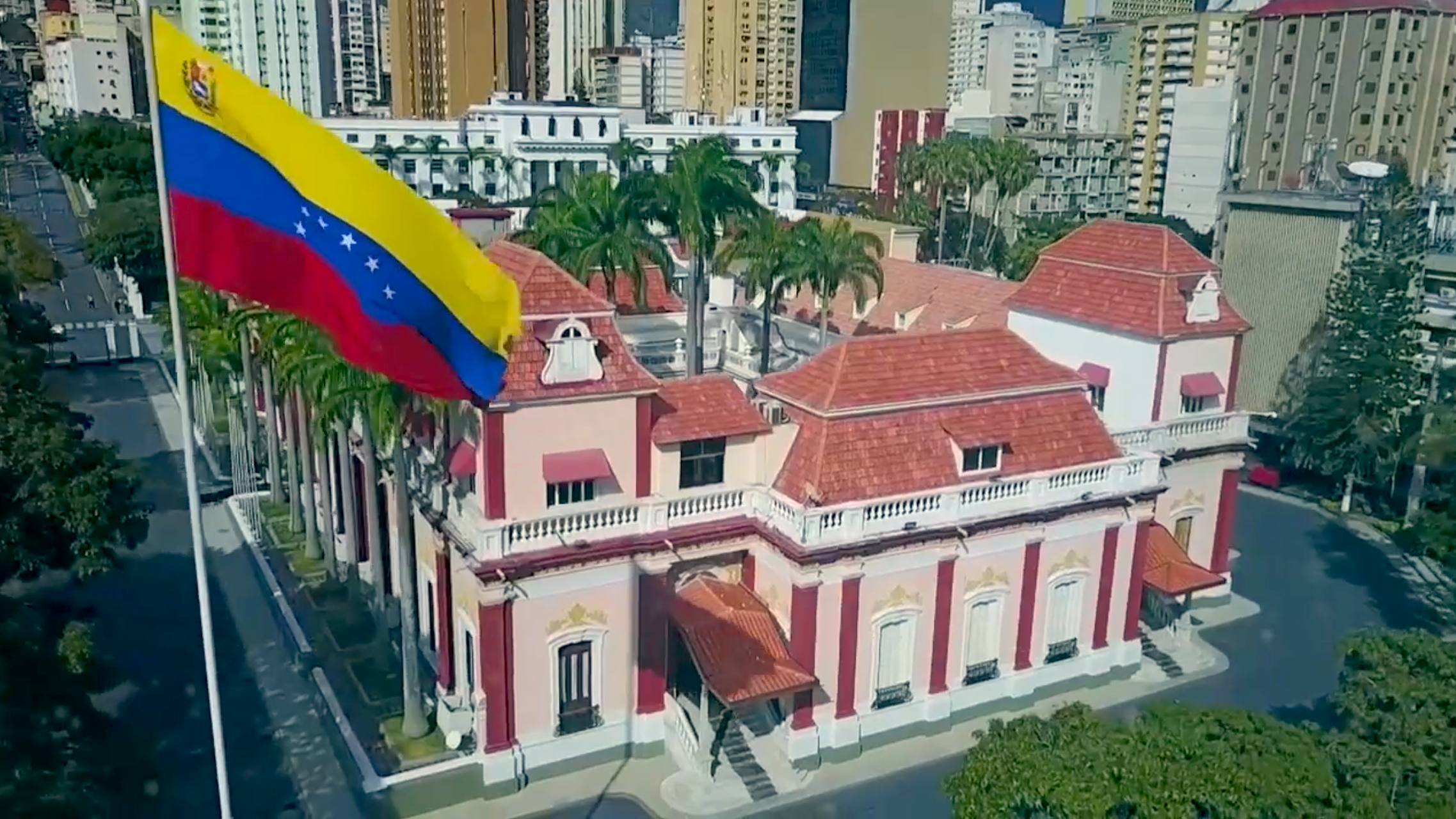
- Interactive map of the Miraflores Palace area

General information
- Architectural style: Neoclassical
- Location: Urdaneta Avenue, Libertador Bolivarian Municipality, Caracas, Venezuela
- Coordinates: 10.50803°N 66.91938°W
- Construction started: 1884
- Completed: 1897
- Client: Joaquín Crespo

Design and construction
- Architect: Giuseppe Orsi di Mombello

The Miraflores Palace (Spanish: Palacio de Miraflores) is the official dispatch and head office of the president of Venezuela. It is located on Urdaneta Avenue, Libertador Bolivarian Municipality in Caracas.

== History ==
=== Construction and decoration ===
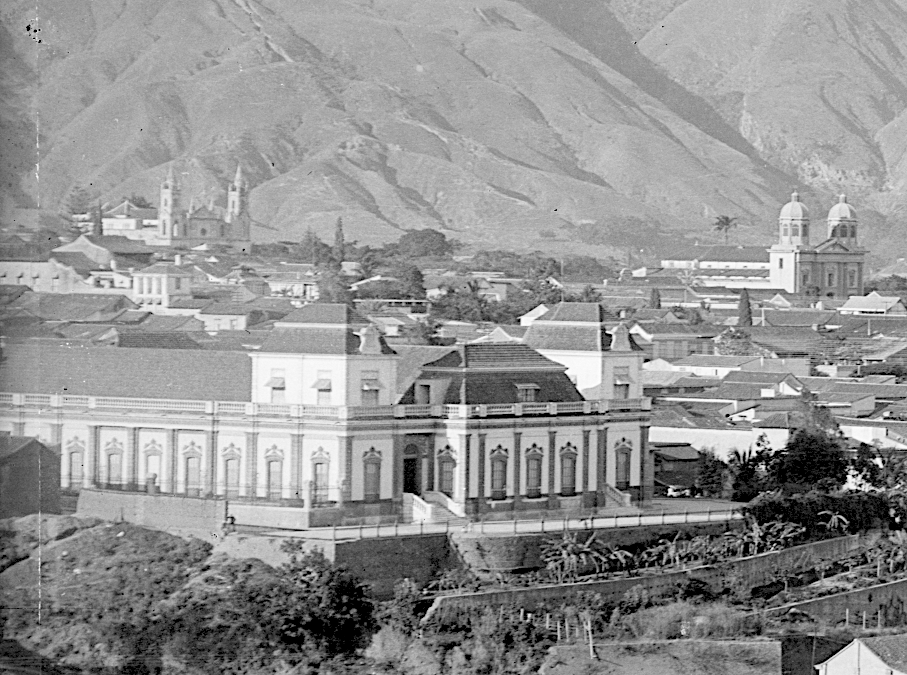
The palace shortly after its construction, c. 1900

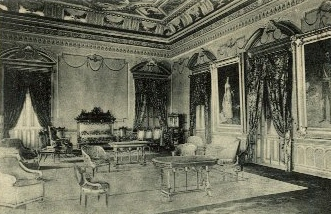
Interior of the palace in the beginning of the 20th century

Construction on the building started on 27 April 1884, under the direction of Giuseppe Orsi, intended as the family residence of Joaquin Crespo. Also participating: painter Julián Oñate, Juan Bautista Sales and his team of sculptors, decorators, wood carvers, builders – who erected the European-style Miraflores Palace. To decorate it, furniture was imported from Barcelona, Spain; a bronze rosette was commissioned from the Marrera foundry and 24 bronze lamps were ordered from Requena brothers at San Juan de los Morros, Guárico state. In 1911, the national administration acquired the property from General Félix Galavis at a cost of five hundred thousand bolívares, and Miraflores Palace became the official presidential residence and office.

After many modifications, the current palace presents fountains encompassed by corridors and halls, such as the Peruvian Sun Hall, decorated with gold donated by the government of Peru; the Joaquín Crespo Hall, with its four gigantic rock-crystal mirrors; Vargas Swamp, which commemorates the Battle of Boyacá, in Colombia; the Ambassador Hall, where diplomats are received; and Ayacucho Hall, in honor of Marshal Antonio José de Sucre and the battle in which he starred.

=== Early years as presidential residence ===
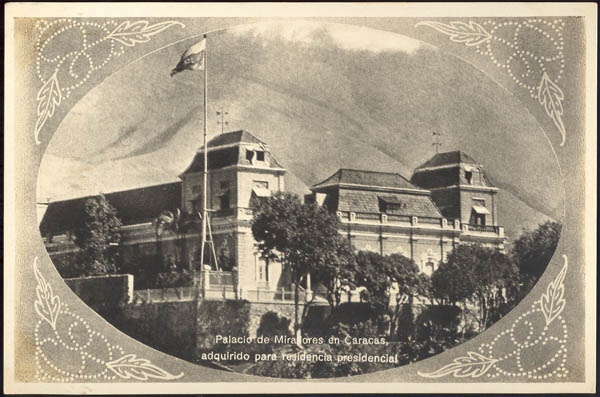
Miraflores facade in 1930

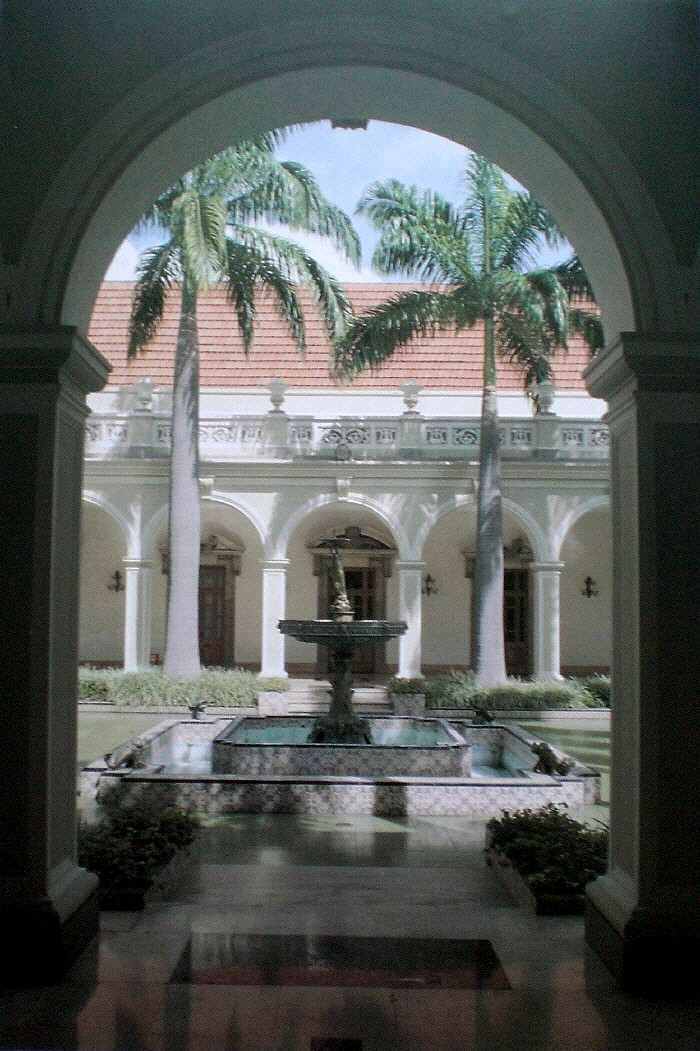
Main courtyard of the palace

Miraflores Palace served as presidential residence of Cipriano Castro and then Juan Vicente Gómez, who occupied it until 1913. From 1914 to 1922, it functioned as office to the provisional administration of Victorino Márquez Bustillos. In 1923, Miraflores witnessed the murder of Vice-president Juan Crisóstomo Gómez, brother of President Juan Vicente Gómez. From 1931 to 1935, the palace was uninhabited, guarded by the army. During the governments of Eleazar López Contreras and Isaías Medina Angarita, the presidential office was modified. In 1945, Rómulo Betancourt became the first president who identified the seat of government as Miraflores Palace, replacing the name Federal Palace.

=== Expansions and restorations ===
In the dictatorship of Marcos Pérez Jiménez, architect Luis Malaussena introduced radical changes inside the palace, eliminating part of Crespo's era decoration. The succeeding administrations made some additions: a Japanese garden, an administration building, the Ayacucho Hall, and the Bicentennial square. In the first period of Rafael Caldera (1969–1974), construction of the Administrative Building began. In February 1979, the palace was declared a National Historical Monument. During the government of Luis Herrera Campins (1979–1984), the Administrative Building and the Bicentennial square were finished. In the mid 1980s, the area for the Council of Ministers was extended. During the 1990s and 2000s, restoration of the original aspects of the palace began. Miraflores has sometimes been the residence of the president of Venezuela, although La Casona is the actual official residence. In February 2007, the Simón Bolívar Press Room opened.

== Miraflores Historical Archive ==
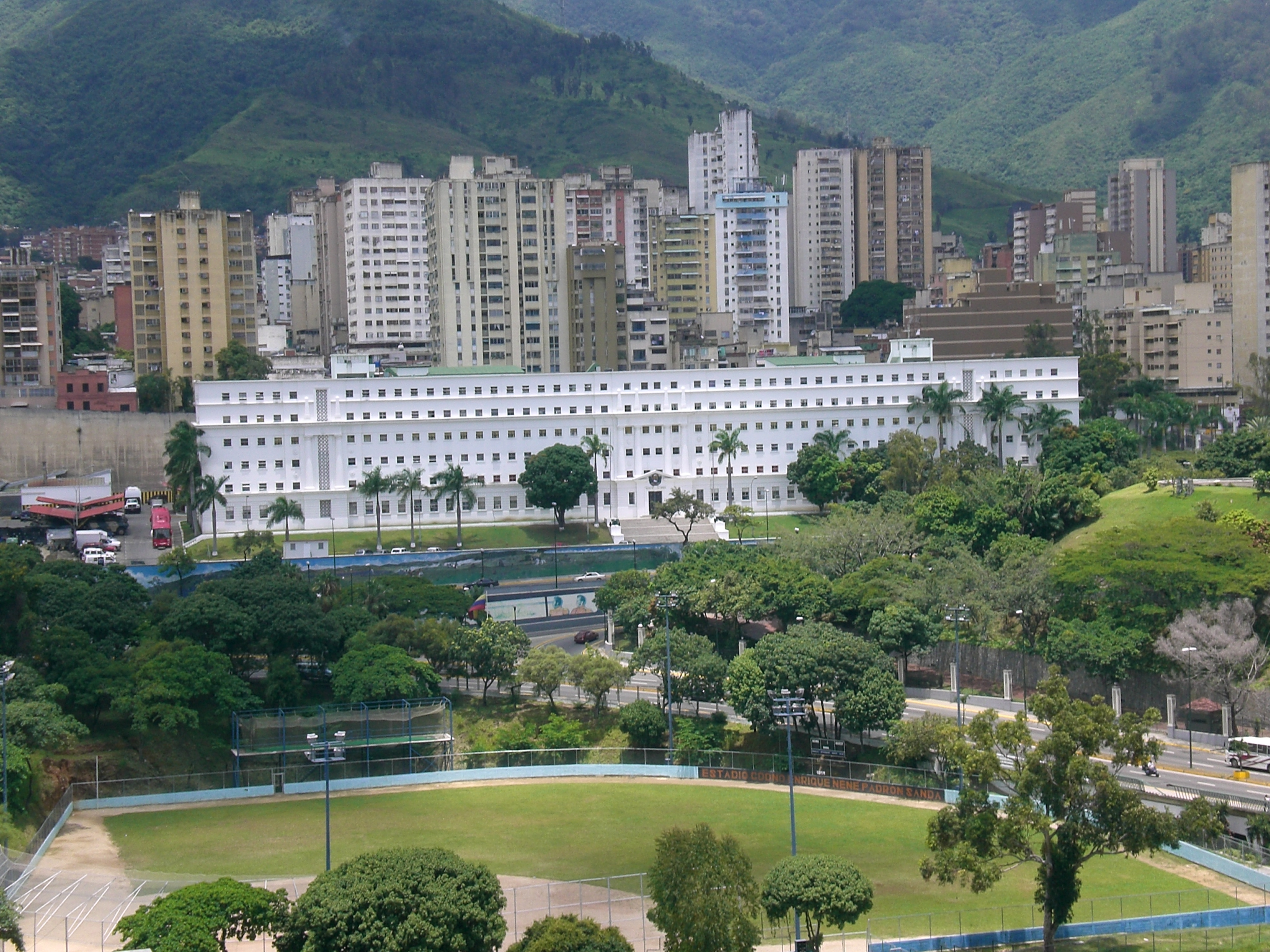
The Fernando Rodríguez del Toro barracks houses the presidential guard. The Miraflores Historical Archive is based on documents that had been stored in the presidential guard basement.

With a volume of documents of nearly 15 million pages, the Miraflores Historical Archive has the mission to preserve the files of Venezuelan presidents. This process began in 1959, when Secretary of Presidency Ramón José Velásquez, undertook the rescue and recovery of files corresponding to the governments of Cipriano Castro (1899–1908) and Juan Vicente Gómez (1908–1935), located in the basement of Presidential Guard. This action marked the beginning of the processes of recovery and preservation of documentary information generated by the presidency. In 1979, Nora Bustamante Luciani was appointed as director of the archive. Throughout her tenure, which terminated in 1995, Bustamante worked on the first indices of the archive's Bulletin. She published two volumes as a guide to the first one hundred issues. The documentary fund filed documents from 1899 until 1983. The different document types that comprise the fund, originated a rating system divided into chronological sections.

== Rooms ==
=== Ayacucho ===
Ayacucho is mainly used for official events and addresses to the nation. Is conformed by wood walls, with a capacity for 200 to 250 people located in front of a podium. The room is used to receive heads of state and government and for special occasions such as the recognition with the Order of the Liberator to personalities of politics, culture and society; award only given by presidential decree. In Ayacucho room emphasizes a painting of Simón Bolívar, located behind the desk where the President addresses the country via radio, television, and the internet. The room was named in honor to the battle of Ayacucho.

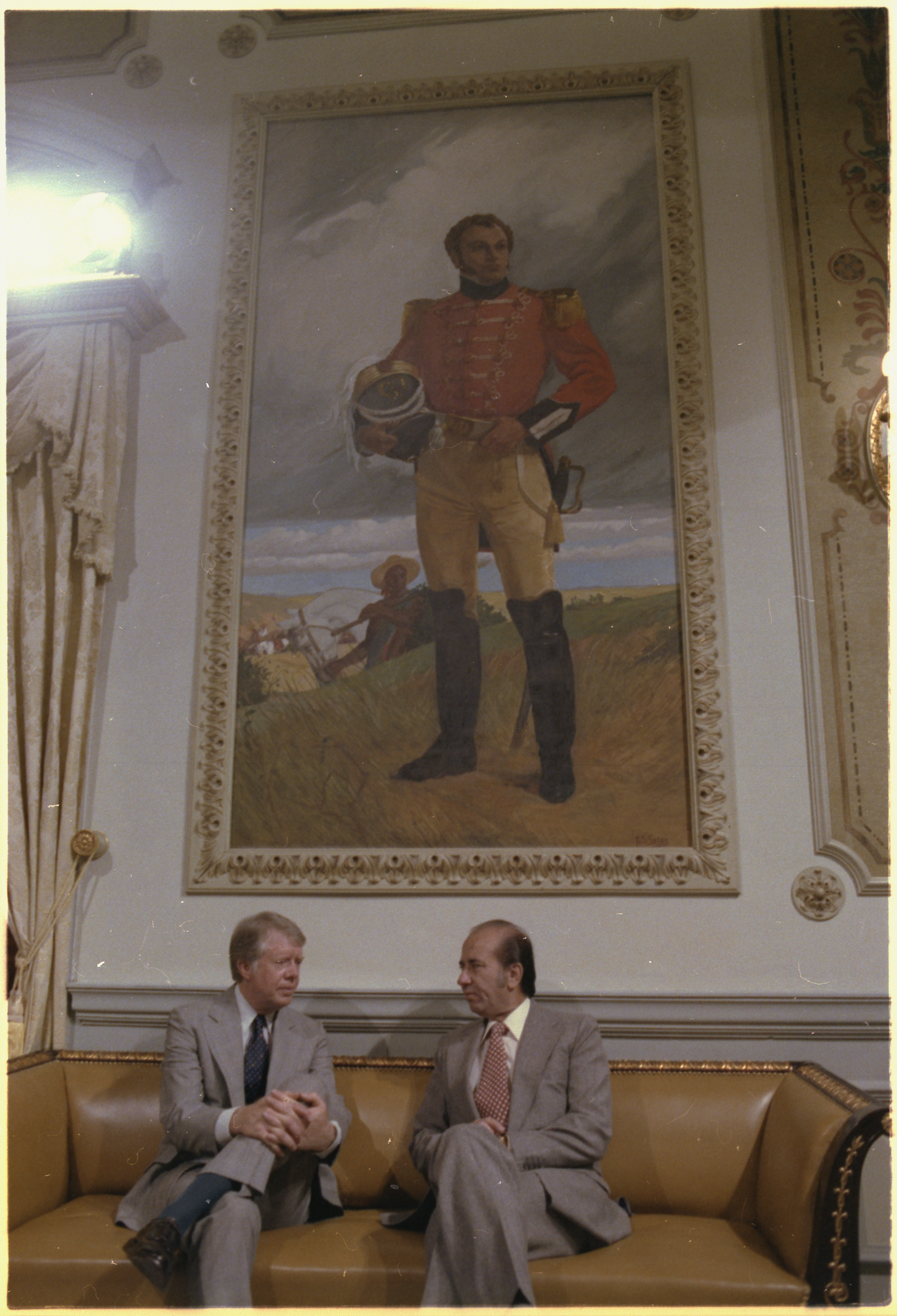
US President Jimmy Carter and Carlos Andrés Pérez in the presidential office, 1978

=== Boyacá ===
It is one of the largest rooms of the palace, and is named in honor of the battle won by Simón Bolívar on 7 August 1819, after which most of the Colombian territory was freed. It was built in the early 1960s, becoming a space for meetings and lunch in honor to national and international personalities. The decoration of the room is formed by a parquetry floor and wood ceilings and baseboards.

Boyacá is also decorated by a painting of muralist Gabriel Bracho, who represents the faces of Bolívar, Francisco de Paula Santander and José Antonio Anzoátegui, heroes of Boyacá. The painting was inaugurated by President Rafael Caldera during his first term in office, on 1 August 1973. The room also has the busts of General José Antonio Anzoátegui and Andrés Bello.

=== Council of Ministers ===
The area for the council of ministers is conformed by a corridor, the lobby and the meeting room. The corridor connects the entrance with the lobby. Both sides include pieces of the artistic heritage of Miraflores, such as the painting Bolívar by Cirilo Almeida and a bust of Carlos Soublette. In front of the vestibule are located a charcoal work representing Francisco de Miranda and a portrait of José María Vargas by painter Alirio Palacios.

The lobby is formed by a printing of Simón Bolívar of Alirio Palacios, the paintings Los Pescadores (The Fishermen) by Luisa Palacios (1958), La Tempestad (The Tempest) by César Rengifo (1958) and a piece of furniture with a style from the first half of 18th century. Also, there is a miniature of the monument erected in Campo Carabobo, the painting La Patria al Soldado (From Nation to Soldier) by Hugo Daini, and a bust of Bolívar in the entrance of the meeting room. The meeting room is the area for the council of ministers. Is conformed by a long oval table and a portrait of Simón Bolívar by painter José María Espinoza.

=== Joaquín Crespo (Hall of the Mirrors) ===
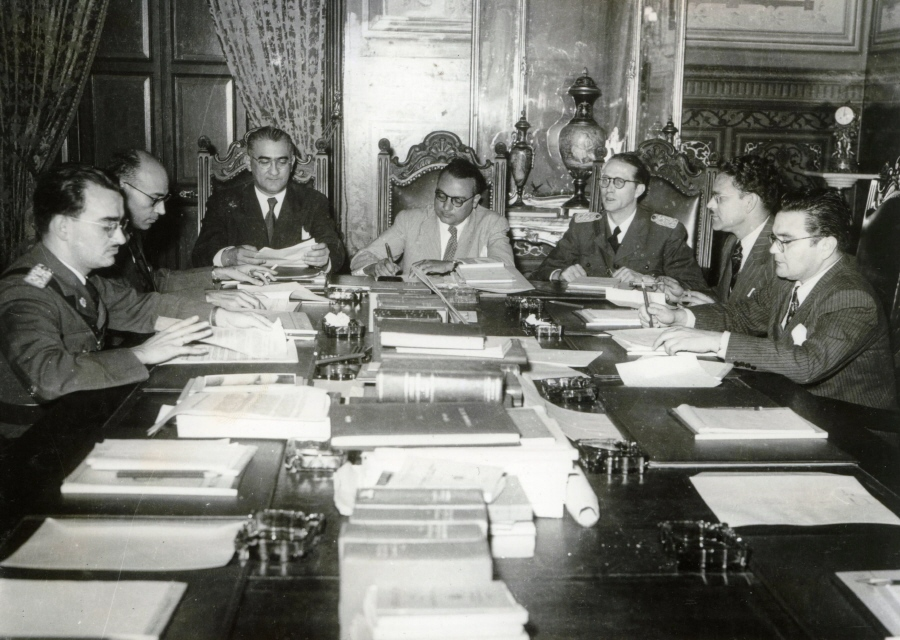
The Revolutionary Government Junta, during a meeting in former Hall of the Mirrors, 1945

Joaquín Crespo room is used for formal meetings of the council of ministers, welcome the diplomatic corps and for the appointments of new ministers and ambassadors. It is characterized by a long table in the middle, two large paintings behind the presidential chair and four gigantic rock-crystal mirrors. It was known as Hall of the Mirrors until 2003 when it was renamed in honor to the first guest of the palace.

=== Sun of Peru ===
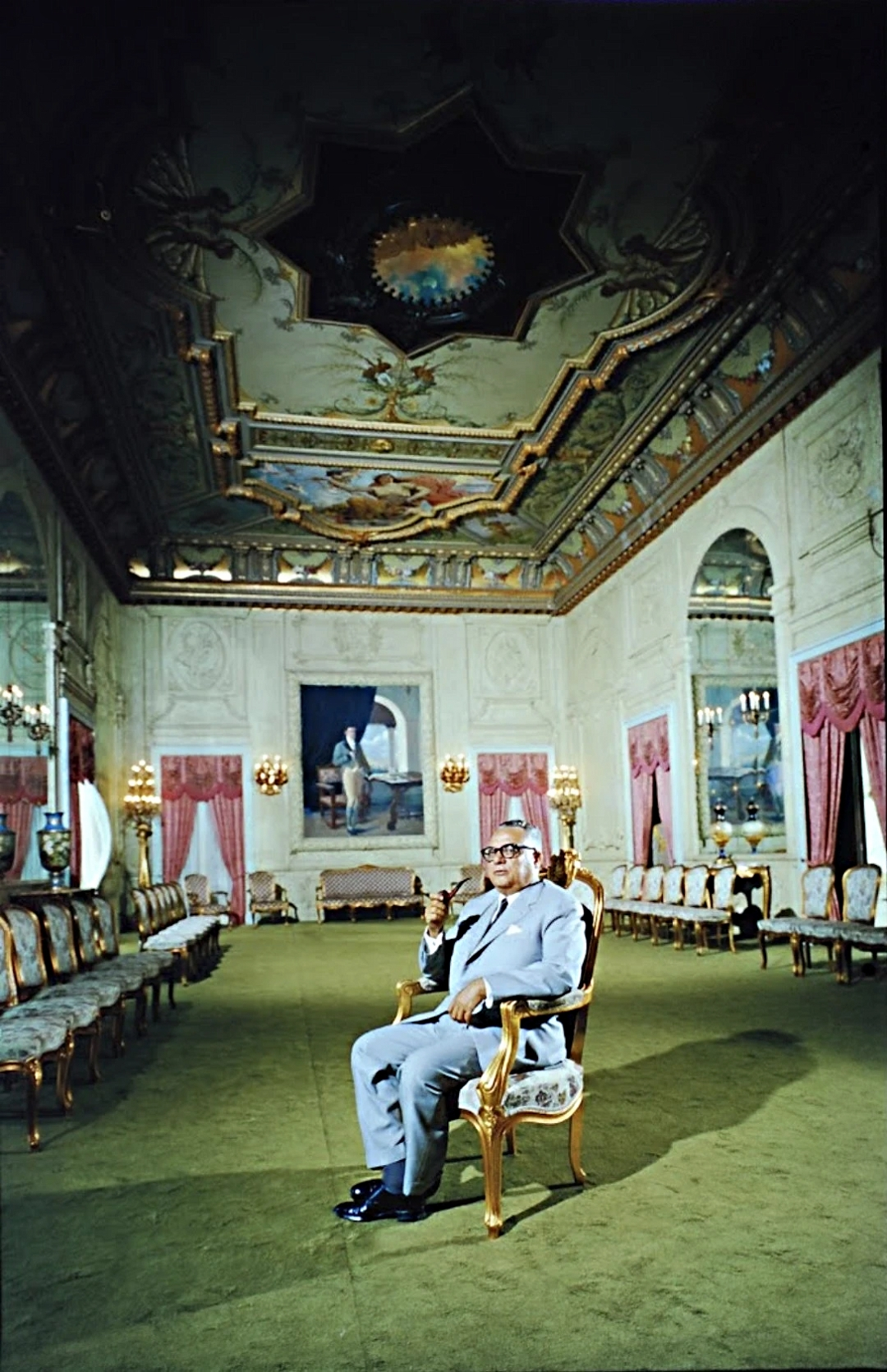
Rómulo Betancourt in the room posing for LIFE magazine, c. 1960

It is one of the most representative rooms of the palace. It is used mainly for diplomatic accreditation and special events of the presidency. In this room highlights a gold sun donated by the Peruvian government, the work: El Día y la noche (Day and night), by Arturo Michelena, an equestrian portrait of Simón Bolívar (1936) as the main painting of the room, and a portrait of the first president of Venezuela: Cristóbal Mendoza. Both works of Tito Salas.

=== Vargas Swamp ===
This rectangular room was named after the victory of Simón Bolivar on 25 July 1819, in the battle of the same name, during the independence of Nueva Granada. It is used as a waiting room for people participating in ceremonies in Joaquín Crespo hall, and for visitors in general.

Presentations of books published under the auspices of the presidency and other government bodies also take place in the Vargas Swamp Room. Notable personalities may also be honoured here.

Also kept in this room are some of the presidential chairs from former administrations: José Antonio Páez, Antonio Guzmán Blanco, Joaquín Crespo and Juan Vicente Gómez. The furniture of the room consists of ten pieces, couches and chairs, two consoles and a piano. There is a mosaic floor, and the ceiling is criss-crossed by dark wooden beams.

== See also ==
- History of Venezuela
- List of official residences
- List of presidents of Venezuela
- List of first ladies of Venezuela
- Jacinta Parejo (first lady in the late 19th century)
