= Jacinta Parejo =

First Lady of Venezuela

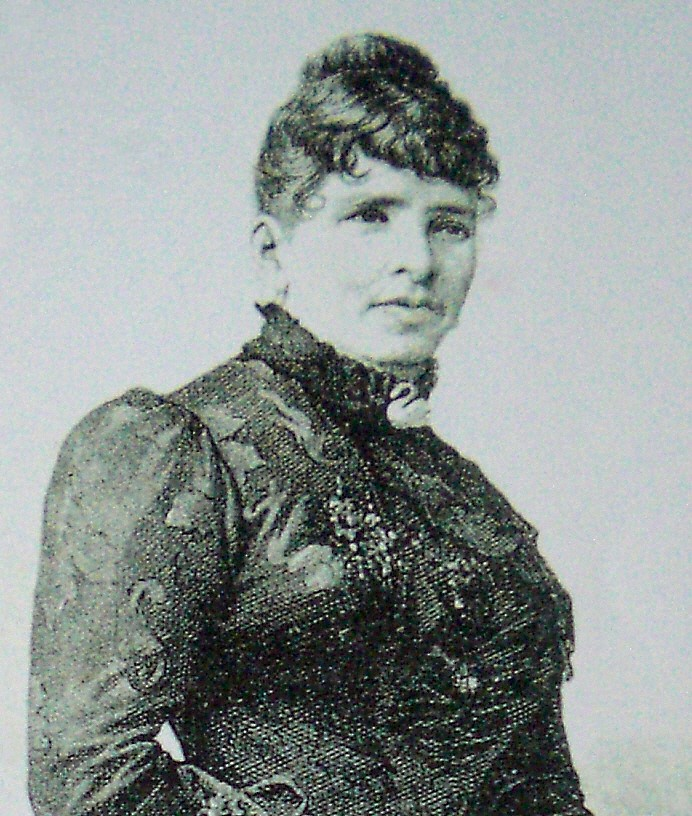

First Lady of Venezuela
- President: Joaquín Crespo
- In role April 26, 1884 – September 15, 1886
- Preceded by: Ana Teresa Ibarra Urbaneja
- Succeeded by: Ana Teresa Ibarra Urbaneja
- In role October 7, 1892 – February 28, 1898
- Preceded by: Isabel González Esteves
- Succeeded by: María Isabel Sosa Saa

Personal details
- Born: August 16, 1845 Parapara, Guárico, State of Venezuela
- Died: April 16, 1914 (aged 68) Caracas, United States of Venezuela
- Resting place: Southern General Cemetery
- Spouse(s): Saturnino Silva; Joaquín Crespo
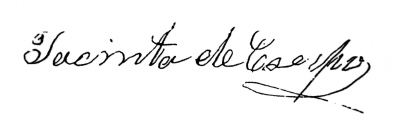
- Signature

Jacinta Parejo de Crespo (August 16, 1845–April 16, 1914), better known as Misia Jacinta, was a Venezuelan public figure and the First Lady of Venezuela from 1884 to 1886 and from 1892 to 1898 during the presidential terms of Joaquín Crespo. Parejo was the first woman in Venezuela to intercede in official policy in a very involved fashion. She held government meetings, worked on projects of the head of state, and at times interceded on the behalf of political prisoners. Her second husband was killed in battle in 1898, and Parejo afterwards became the defender of their family's legacy. VenezuelaTuya states that the legal succession of Parejo and Crespo was "one of the biggest legal disputes of the early twentieth century in Venezuela".

== Early life ==
Jacinta Parejo de Crespo was born on August 16, 1845, to Juan Parejo and Maria Josefa Parejo in Guárico. on August 8, 1861, she married General Saturnino Silva. Silva died in combat during the Federal War. In the aftermath of the death, she met General Joaquín Crespo. Crespo, like her, was native to Guarico. Crespo was also a confidant of General Antonio Guzman Blanco, who was to become president of Venezuela. She and Crespo married on September 18, 1864. She remained married to Crespo during his subsequent positions in the Venezuelan government until his death in combat.

== Political career ==
=== 1884-1886: First term as First Lady ===
She first served as First Lady of Venezuela from 1884 until 1886. Parejo was the first woman in Venezuela to intercede in official policy in such a fashion. She held meetings, worked on projects of the head of state, and at times interceded on the behalf of political prisoners to Crespo.

=== 1892: Legalist Revolution and final term ===
According to Venezuelatuya, Crespo relied greatly on her advice and confidence during his career, and asserts that in 1892 she "made up for the lack of committees or revolutionary juntas in the clandestine organization of the Legalista Revolution." While Crespo campaigned with the military in remote areas of Venezuela, Parejo lived in Caracas and contributed to the campaign through secret correspondence and shipping items to officers at the battlefront. On June 17, 1892, Parejo's husband overthrew President Raimundo Andueza Palacio. Following the resignation of subsequent president Guillermo Tell Villegas during the crisis of the Legalist Revolution, Guillermo Tell Villegas Pulido was selected by the Federal Council as the provisional president of Venezuela in August 1892. After Crespo established himself as president by force in October 1892, Villegas Pulido left the country. She again became First Lady on October 7, 1892.

=== 1893-1898: End of term and late life ===
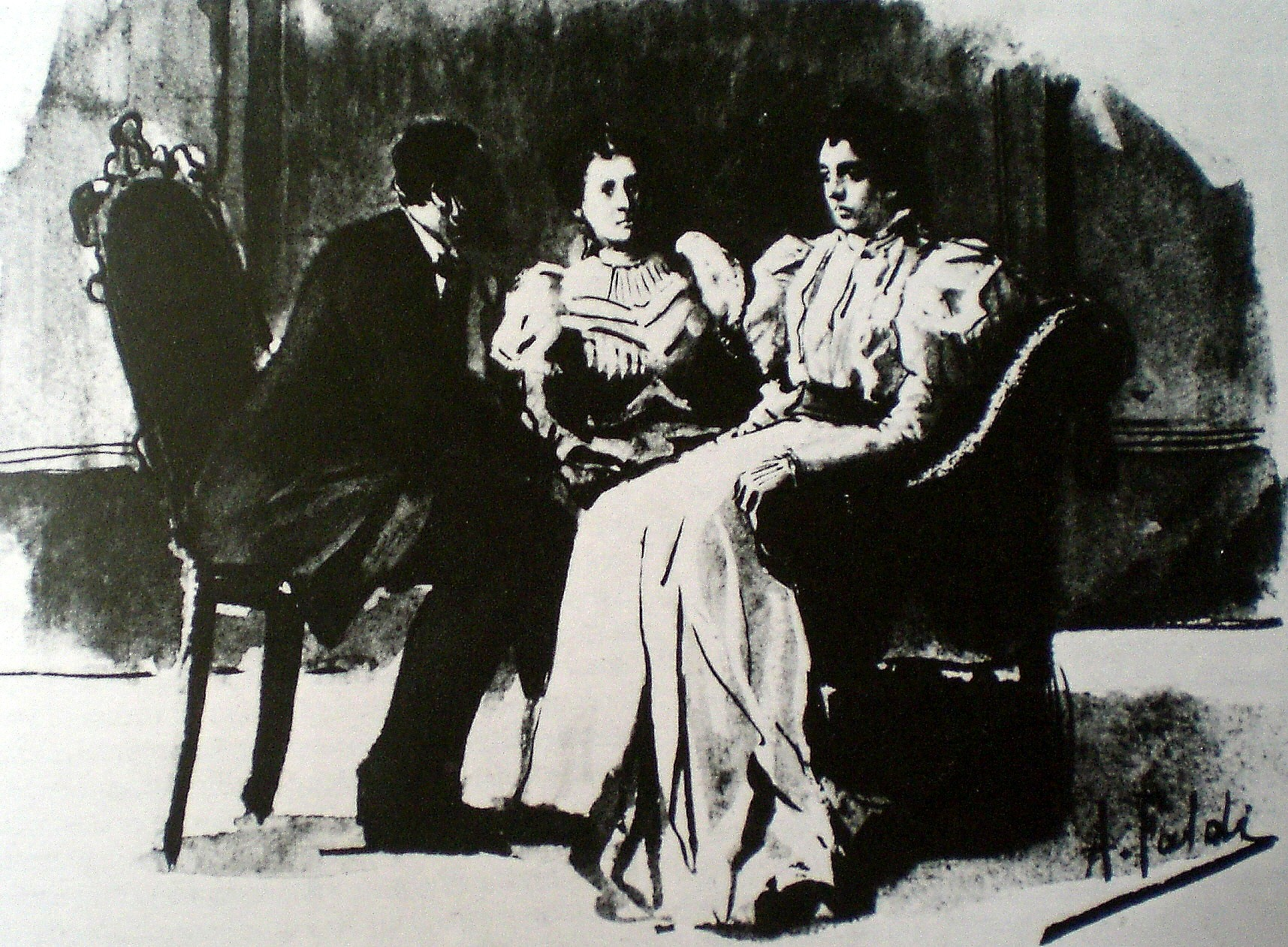
Drawing depicting the moment Parejo receives condolences from Juan Pietri on the death of Crespo

In 1897, Crespo did not campaign for a third presidential term but supported Ignacio Andrade against key opponent José Manuel Hernández. Andrade won the election, and his wife María Isabel Sosa Saa replaced Parejo as First Lady on February 28, 1898. Hernandez decried the results as fraudulent and took up arms. Hernandez was quickly defeated, with resultant political turmoil. Crespo was killed in battle on April 16, 1898 in the Battle of Mata Carmelera while defending the government of Ignacio Andrade. Parejo afterwards became the defender of their family's legacy. According to VenezuelaTuya, while grieving, she failed to prevent several lawsuits, particularly one filed by the Colombian general Vicente Sebastián Mestre. Sebastián claimed that he was owed Bs. 700,000 in damages for a canceled military contract.

== Death and legacy ==
Parejo died on April 16, 1914, in Caracas. According to VenezuelaTuya, the legal succession of Parejo and Crespo is "one of the biggest legal disputes of the early twentieth century in Venezuela." According to the dispute, popular traditions holds that Crespo allegedly had a first mistress and never lived in the Miraflores Palace, dubbed "The House of Misia Jacinta."

During the crisis in Bolivarian Venezuela, the tomb of Crespo and his wife Jacinta was looted and vandalized, leaving their bodies exposed to the elements.

== See also ==
- List of first ladies of Venezuela
- List of Venezuelans

Honorary titles
Preceded by Ana Teresa Ibarra Urbaneja	First Lady of Venezuela; 1884–1886	Succeeded by Ana Teresa Ibarra Urbaneja
Preceded by Isabel González Esteves	First Lady of Venezuela; 1892–1898	Succeeded by María Isabel Sosa Saa
