= Manuel Felipe de Tovar =

President of Venezuela from 1859 to 1961

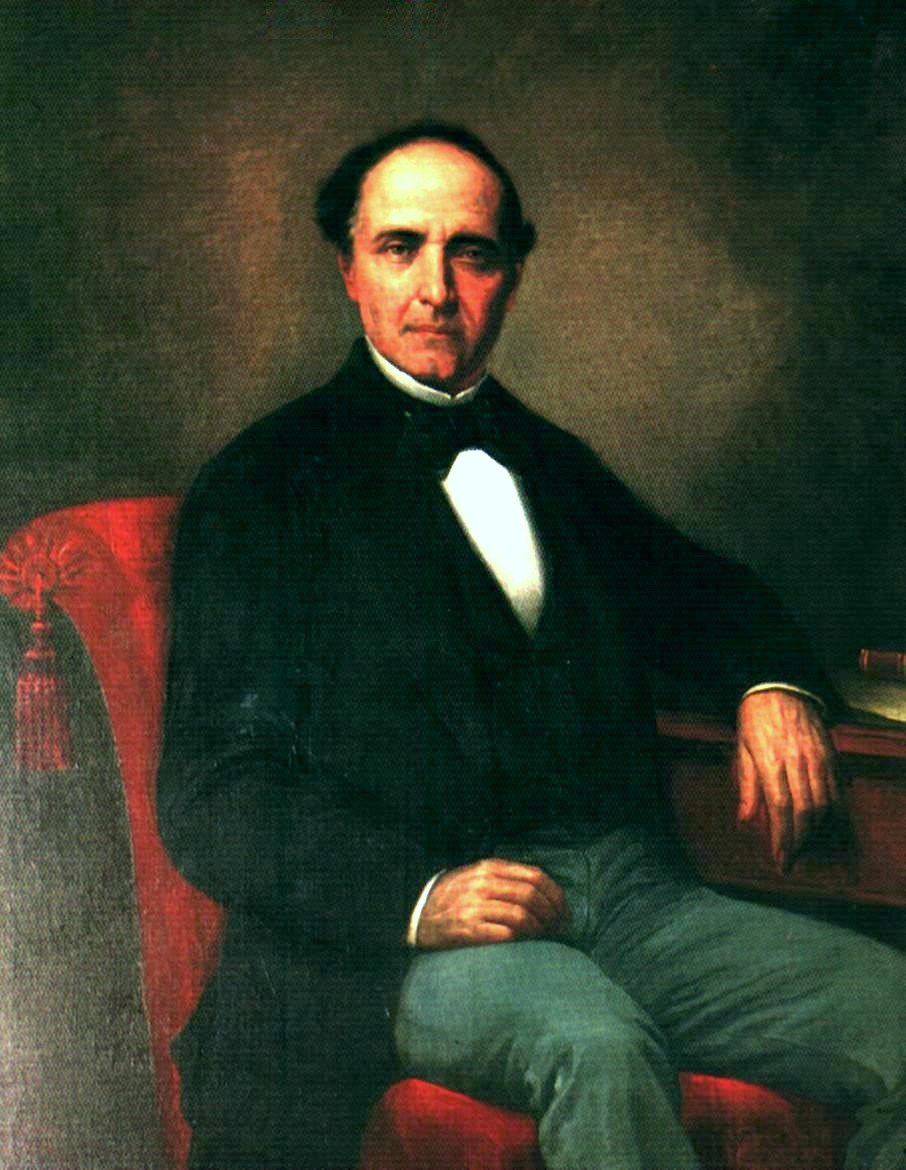
- Portrait by Martín Tovar y Tovar

14th President of Venezuela
- In office 29 September 1859 – 20 May 1861
- Preceded by: Pedro Gual Escandón
- Succeeded by: Pedro Gual Escandón

Personal details
- Born: 1 January 1803 Caracas, Venezuela
- Died: 21 February 1866 (aged 63) Paris, France
- Spouse: Encarnación Rivas Pacheco

Manuel Felipe de Tovar (1 January 1803, in Caracas – 21 February 1866, in Paris) was the president of Venezuela from 1859–1861.

== Presidency ==
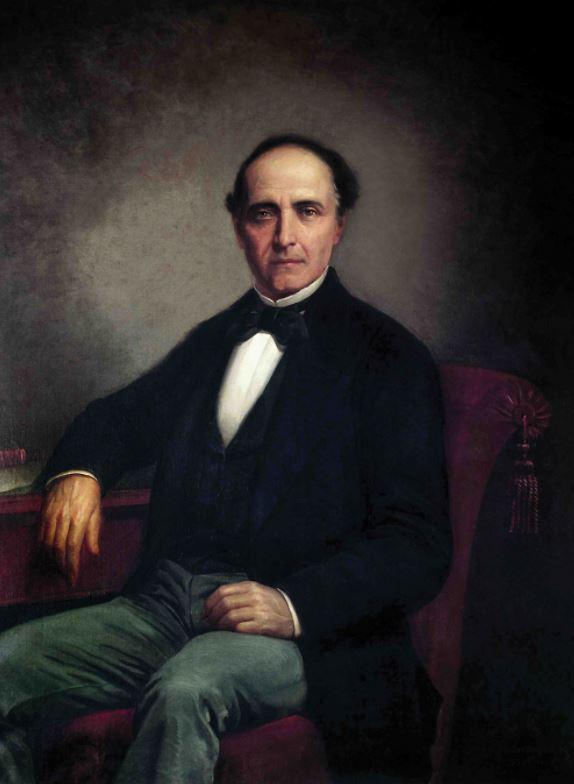
Manuel Felipe de Tovar.

The presidency of Manuel Felipe de Tovar (1859–1861) consisted of two administrations: the first as interim president in 1859 following his assumption of the vice presidency, and the second as the first president elected by direct male suffrage in Venezuela's history, taking office in 1860 after the ousting and arrest of Julián Castro during the Federal War. Tovar resigned the following year amid a political crisis.

== Personal life ==
Manuel Felipe de Tovar was married to Encarnación Rivas Pacheco, who served as First Lady of Venezuela from 1859–1861.

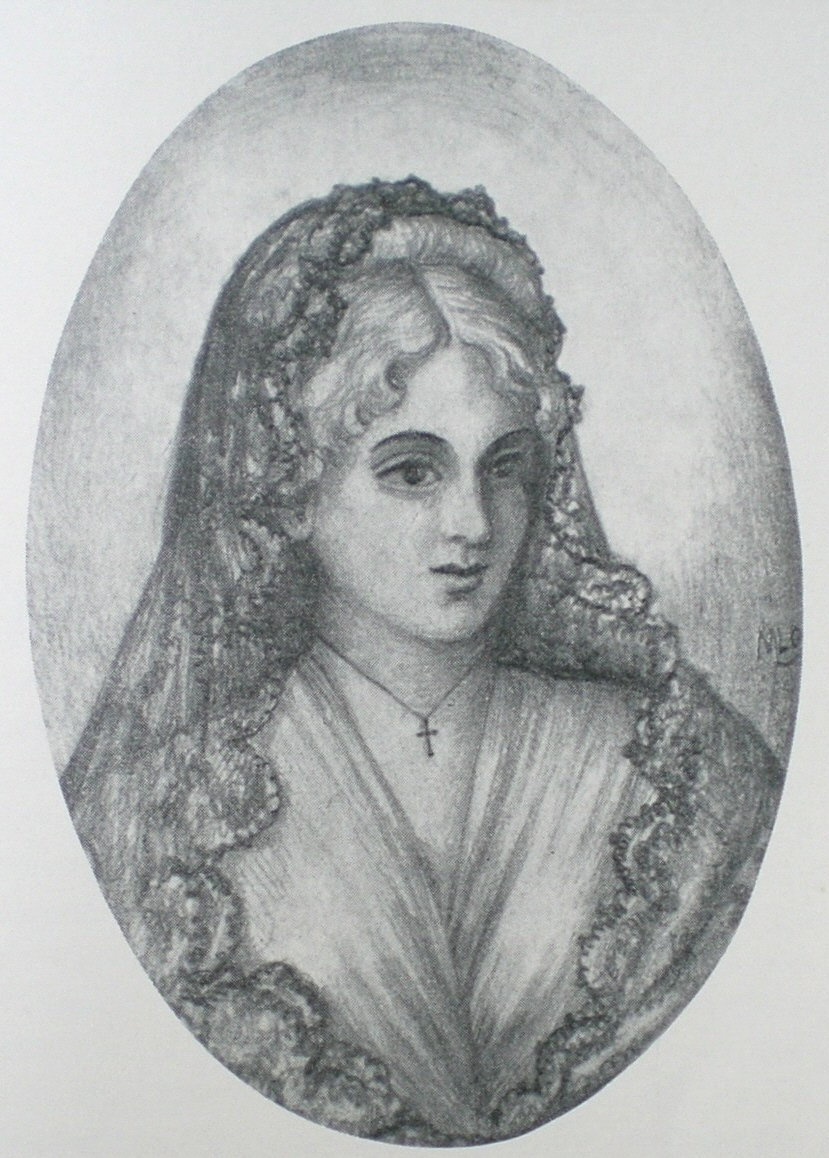
Encarnación Rivas Pacheco

== See also ==
- Venezuela
- Presidents of Venezuela

Political offices
| Preceded by Pedro Gual Escandon | President of Venezuela; 1859–1861 | Succeeded by Pedro Gual Escandon |
