= La Carlota, Miranda =

Neighborhood of Caracas, Venezuela

La Carlota
- Neighborhood
- Location in Venezuela
- Coordinates: 10°29′30″N 66°50′1″W
- Country: Venezuela
- State: Miranda
- Municipality: Sucre Municipality, Miranda

La Carlota is a neighborhood in the Sucre municipality of Caracas, Venezuela. Italian infrastructures of more than 50 years of creation are seen in this area of the Venezuelan capital, especially in the urbanization that surrounds the former presidential residence La Casona, its architecture is typical of the towns and cities of Italy with wide sidewalks and outdoor cafés. The Generalissimo Francisco de Miranda Air Base, sometimes also called La Carlota, is located nearby.

== History ==
La Carlota was one of the mainly settlements for Italians during 50-60s of the last century, infrastructures were built in a similar way to some Italian regions, the Italian community has preserve their customs, such as playing dominoes and cards in some cafes, although the Italians who arrived in that decade practiced trades, such as agriculture, cooking, shoemaking, barbershop and even jewelry, it is in the construction sector where their presence is seen through the city being strongly Italophilic as cuisine, fashion, and lifestyle have a big impact culturally.

== El Cine La Carlota ==
Cine La Carlota (a Spanish name meaning "La Carlota Cinema") was a theater inaugurated on August 28, 1956, located in the building Poggio Morello which was the highest infrastructure of the area, Cine La Carlota was the stage for the greatest Italian artists of that time many of them would stop by during 1925 and 1960. Cine La Carlota was the meeting place for those Italians who lived in the area, most of films projected were Italian.

== Economy ==
A large group of these expatriates found a home in La Carlota, which brought to the country their skills as bakers, builders, and experts in the leather industry. Companies at the hands of Italians were founded, a solid manufacturing experience were developed, and thus in a few years a significant group of leather footwear and accessories companies established in the area. Immigrants contributed to create an architecture, a gastronomy and an industry that at the time left their mark on this city.

La Carlota was one of areas chosen by the Italian ambassador to Venezuela, Silvio Mignano, to close the XVII Italian Language Week in Venezuela.
