= Sopotocientos =

- Directed by: Alba Revenga

Sopotocientos is a Venezuelan children's television program broadcast in the early 1970s.

== Program ==
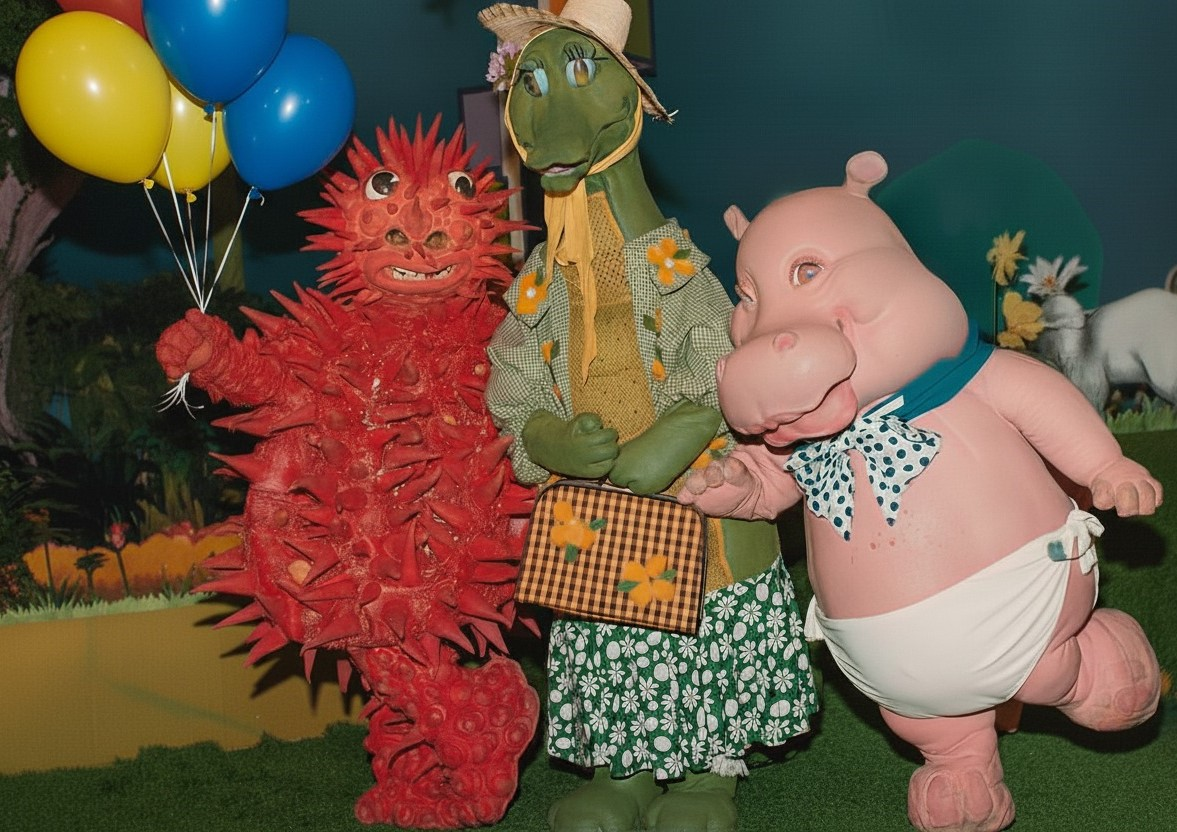
The three humanoid protagonists of Sopotocientos, from left to right: Rascón Corroncho, Doña Coco, and Potamito.

Sopotocientos produced and broadcast in the early seventies by Televisora Nacional, channel 5. The series was similar in style to Sesame Street, starring children and characters representing animals. The series was a great success during its broadcast, and later an album with its featured songs was released. Despite being broadcast on channel 5, Sopotocientos was a community program, which meant that other Venezuelan television channels collaborated in the production. The series was promoted by First Lady Alicia Pietri de Caldera, and was both advised and directed by psychologist Alba Revenga, who was later in charge of the contents of the Children's Museum of Caracas.

According to Alicia Pietri, the series reached an audience of over a million children viewers and was awarded the Meridiano de Oro and Guacaipuro de Oro awards.

== Characters ==
- Rascón Corroncho: Hedgehog played by Óscar Ibarra
- Potamito: Hippopotamus played by Martha Velasco
- Doña Coco: Crocodile played by María Luisa Lamata
- Pablito: Hugo Rojas
- Tinita: Karin Lechner
- The father: Julio Capote
- The mother: América Alonso

== See also ==
- Children's Museum of Caracas
