= Generalissimo Francisco de Miranda Air Base =

Air base in Caracas, Venezuela

Generalissimo Francisco de Miranda Air Base
- Base Aérea Generalísimo Francisco de Miranda
- Caracas, Capital District in Venezuela
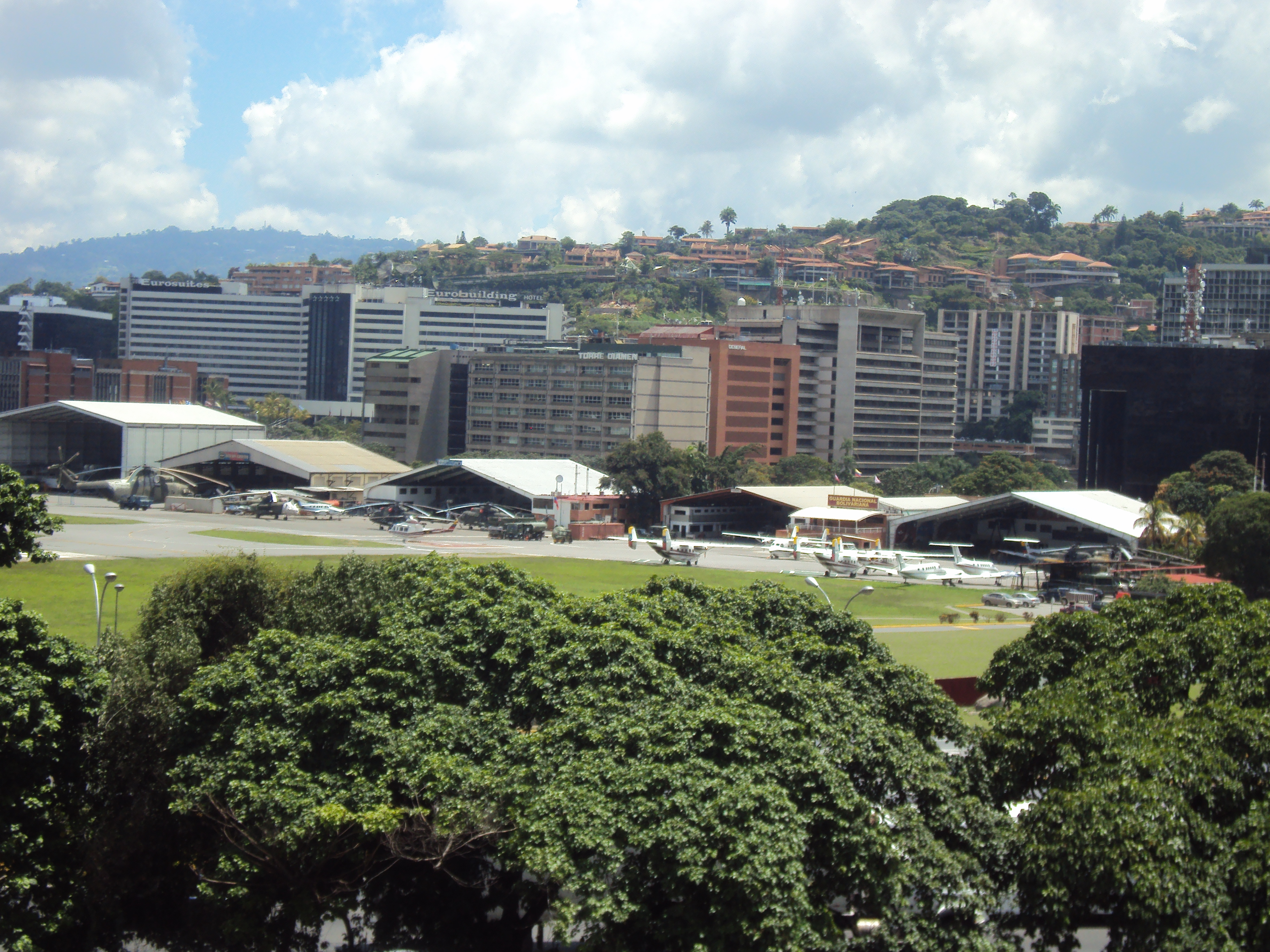

Site information
- Type: Military Air base
- Owner: National Bolivarian Armed Forces of Venezuela
- Operator: Bolivarian Military Aviation of Venezuela

Location
- Shown within Venezuela La Carlota (South America)
- Coordinates: 10°29′06″N 66°50′37″W

Site history
- Built: 1992
- In use: 1992 - present

Airfield information
- Identifiers: ICAO: SVFM
- Elevation: 835 metres (2,740 ft) AMSL
Runways
Direction	Length and surface
11/29	1,974 metres (6,476 ft) Asphalt

Generalissimo Francisco de Miranda Air Base (IATA: N/A, ICAO: SVFM), commonly called by its former name of La Carlota, is located near Caracas, Venezuela. The airport is named for Francisco de Miranda, a South American revolutionary. It is close to La Carlota, Miranda.

The airport was used for tourist and private flights. On 27 November 1992, the airport was bombed during Hugo Chávez's coup attempt. It has been closed to public use since 2005 and is used only for military purposes and aeromedic flights (EMS).

In April 2019, the airport was the starting point of the 2019 Venezuela uprising.

On 3 January 2026 at 02:00 VET, the airport was hit by the US military as part of an operation to abduct Nicolás Maduro.
