= First Lady of Venezuela =

Honorary title for the spouse of the President of Venezuela

- Incumbent; Vacant since 5 January 2026
- Residence: La Casona (until 2012)
- Term length: At the pleasure of the President
- Inaugural holder: Dominga Ortiz
- Formation: 1830

First Lady of Venezuela (Spanish: Primera Dama de Venezuela) is the unofficial title traditionally held by the wife of the president of Venezuela.

== List of first ladies ==
Image	Name (lifespan)	President	Years as First Lady	Notes
	Dominga Ortiz (1 November 1792 – 31 December 1875)	José Antonio Páez	1830–1835 (1st term)	
	Encarnación Maitín	José María Vargas	1835–1836 (only term)	
	Olalla Buroz	Carlos Soublette	1837–1839 (1st term)	
	Dominga Ortiz (1 November 1792 – 31 December 1875)	José Antonio Páez	1839–1843 (2nd term)	
	Olalla Buroz	Carlos Soublette	1843–1847 (2nd term)	
	Luisa Oriach	José Tadeo Monagas	1847–1851 (1st term)	
	Clara Marrero	José Gregorio Monagas	1851–1855 (only term)	
	Luisa Oriach	José Tadeo Monagas	1855–1858 (2nd term)	
	María Nieves Briceño	Julián Castro	1858–1859 (only term)	
	Encarnación Rivas	Manuel Felipe de Tovar	1859–1861 (only term)	
	Dominga Ortiz (1 November 1792 – 31 December 1875)	José Antonio Páez	1861–1863 (3rd term)	
	Luisa Isabel Pachano	Juan Crisóstomo Falcón	1863–1868 (only term)	
	Esperanza Hernández	José Ruperto Monagas	1869–1870 (only term)	
	Ana Teresa Ibarra	Antonio Guzmán	1870–1877 (1st term)	
	Belén Esteves	Francisco Linares	1877–1878 (only term)	
	Ana Teresa Ibarra	Antonio Guzmán	1879–1884 (2nd term)	
	Jacinta Parejo (August 16, 1845 – April 16, 1914)	Joaquín Crespo	1884–1886 (1st term)	
	Ana Teresa Ibarra	Antonio Guzmán	1887–1888 (3rd term)	
	María Josefa de la Concepción Báez	Juan Pablo Rojas	1888–1890 (only term)	
	Isabel González	Raimundo Andueza	1890–1892 (only term)	
	Jacinta Parejo (16 August 1845 – 16 April 1914)	Joaquín Crespo	1892–1898 (2nd term)	
	María Isabel Sosa	Ignacio Andrade	1898–1899 (only term)	
	Zoila Rosa Martínez	Cipriano Castro	1899–1908 (only term)	
	María Teresa Núñez	Eleazar López	1936–1941 (only term)	
	Irma Felizola	Isaías Medina	1941–1945 (only term)	
	Carmen Valverde	Rómulo Betancourt	1945–1948 (1st term)	
	Teotiste Arocha	Rómulo Gallegos	1948 (only term)	
	Lucía Devine	Carlos Delgado	1948–1950 (only term)	
	Rosario Pérez	Germán Suárez	1950–1952 (only term)	
	Flor María Chalbaud	Marcos Pérez	1952–1958 (only term)	
	Mercedes María Paláez (25 October 1933 – 24 November 2002)	Wolfgang Larrazábal	1958 (only term)	
	Carmen Valverde (1903–1977)	Rómulo Betancourt	1959–1964 (2nd term)	
	Carmen América Fernández (1919–1973)	Raúl Leoni	1964–1969 (only term)	
	Alicia Pietri (14 October 1923 – 9 February 2011)	Rafael Caldera	1969–1974 (1st term)	
	Blanca Rodríguez (1 January 1926 – 5 August 2020)	Carlos Andrés Pérez	1974–1979 (1st term)	
	Betty Urdaneta	Luis Herrera	1979–1984 (only term)	
	Gladys Castillo	Jaime Lusinchi	1984–April 1988 (only term)	President Jaime Lusinchi divorced First Lady Gladys in April 1988.
	Blanca Rodríguez (1 January 1926 – 5 August 2020)	Carlos Andrés Pérez	1989–1993 (2nd term)	
	Ligia Betancourt (1920 – 14 July 2008)	Ramón José Velásquez	1993–1994 (only term)	
	Verónica Peñalver (21 July 1924 – ?)	Octavio Lepage	1994 (only term)	
	Alicia Pietri (14 October 1923 – 9 February 2011)	Rafael Caldera	1994–1999 (2nd term)	
	Marisabel Rodríguez (23 November 1964 – present)	Hugo Chávez	1999–2004 (only term)	
	Cilia Flores (15 October 1956 – present)	Nicolás Maduro	2013–2026 (only term)	Disputed with Fabiana Rosales (Note: Cilia Flores recognized as First Lady of Venezuela by China, Russia, Cuba, South Africa, Palestine and other countries. Fabiana Rosales recognized as Acting First Lady of Venezuela by over 50 countries, including the United States, most of the European Union, and by the National Assembly of Venezuela, until the end Venezuelan presidential crisis on 5 January 2023.) (2019–2023) Disputed with Mercedes López (2025-2026)
	Vacant	Delcy Rodríguez	From 5 January 2026	Position empty after the capture of Maduro by the United States

=== Non-spouse first ladies and gentleman ===
Name	Relation to President
Barbarita Nieves	Sentimental partner of José Antonio Páez
Dionisia Bello	Sentimental partner of Juan Vicente Gómez
Amelia Núñez	Sentimental partner of Juan Vicente Gómez
Cecilia Matos	Sentimental partner of Carlos Andrés Pérez
Blanca Ibáñez	Sentimental partner and wife of Jaime Lusinchi from 1991 until his death
María Gabriela Chávez	Daughter of Hugo Chávez
Yussef Abou Nassif	Sentimental partner of Delcy Rodríguez

== See also ==
- First Lady
- Venezuela
- List of presidents of Venezuela

== Notes and references ==
=== References ===
- (in Spanish) List of First Ladies of Venezuela - Venciclopedia
- "Las Presidentas de Venezuela, Primeras Damas de la República en el siglo XIX", Antonio Reyes, 1955
