= Dictatorship of Cipriano Castro =

1899–1908 government in Venezuela

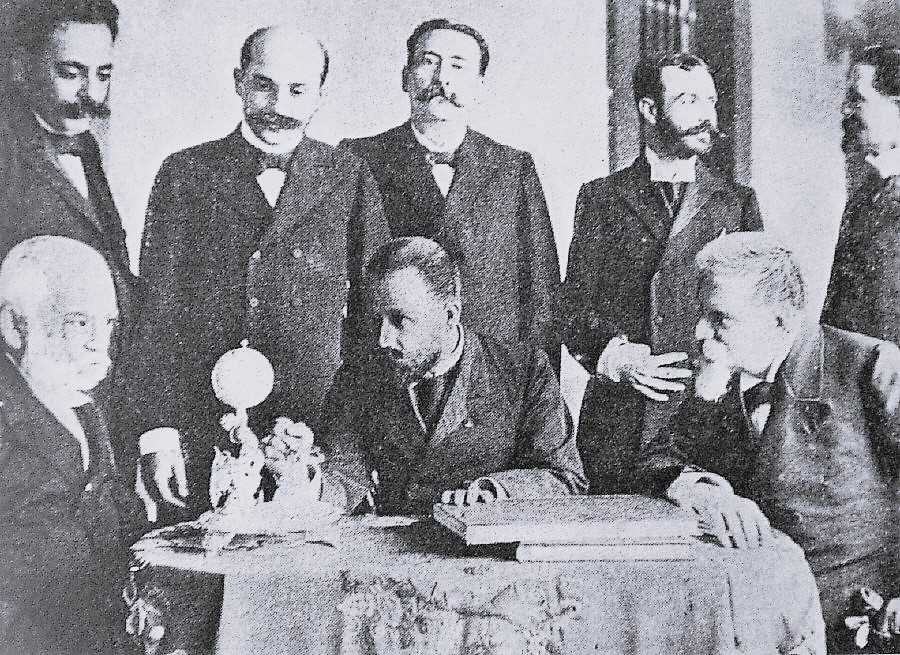
Cipriano Castro and his cabinet in 1902.

The dictatorship of Cipriano Castro (self-proclaimed "Restauración Liberal") is the term used to refer to the military dictatorship in Venezuela under Cipriano Castro that began after he seized power by force in the Restorative Liberal Revolution after invading the country from Colombia with a private army of sixty men.

At the legislative level, the constitutions of 1901 and 1904 were approved, legalising divorce and changing the national flag for the first time in more than forty years.

Defence policy included an increase of up to 22% in the national defence budget. The government was sustained by an effective national army and a centralized, statist administration. It played an important role in ending caudillismo in Venezuela.

Castro's foreign policy included failed support for the liberals in Colombia during the Thousand Days' War with the intention of restoring Gran Colombia, the naval blockade of Venezuela from 1902 to 1903, and the Dutch-Venezuelan crisis of 1908, along with the breakdown of relations with the United States that year. The constitution also prohibited the immigration of black people.

According to historian Elías Pino Iturrieta, it was a personalistic dictatorship plagued by corruption problems that came to dominate the political power elite.

In 1908, Juan Vicente Gómez, Castro's Vice President, conspired to overthrow him in a coup d'état, initiating the period known as Gomecismo.

== Background ==
When former President Joaquín Crespo died in combat and the country fell into political instability, Castro invaded Venezuela from the border with Táchira at the head of about sixty men, with the aim of restoring the influence of Antonio Guzmán Blanco, who died shortly thereafter. This began a period known as the "Andean Hegemony" under the influence of Juan Vicente Gómez.

== Cipriano Castro cabinet (1899–1908) ==
Ministries
OFFICE	NAME	TERM
President	Cipriano Castro	1899–1908
Home Affairs	Juan Francisco Castillo	1899–1900
Home Affairs	Rafael Carrera Malo	1900–1901
Home Affairs	José Antonio Velutini	1901–1902
Home Affairs	Rafael López Baralt	1902–1903
Home Affairs	Leopoldo Baptista	1903–1907
Home Affairs	Julio Torres Cárdenas	1907
Home Affairs	Rafael López Baralt	1907–1908
Outer Relations	Raimundo Andueza Palacio	1899–1900
Outer Relations	Eduardo Blanco	1900–1901
Outer Relations	Jacinto Regino Pachano	1901–1902
Outer Relations	Diego Bautista Ferrer	1902–1903
Outer Relations	Alejandro Urbaneja	1903
Outer Relations	Gustavo Sanabria	1903–1905
Outer Relations	Alejandro Ibarra	1905–1906
Outer Relations	José de Jesús Paúl	1906–1908
Finance	Ramón Tello Mendoza	1899–1903
Finance	José Cecilio De Castro	1903–1906
Finance	Francisco de Sales Pérez	1906
Finance	Gustavo Sanabria	1906
Finance	Eduardo Celis	1906–1907
Finance	Arnaldo Morales	1906–1907
War and Navy	José Ignacio Pulido	1899–1902
War and Navy	Ramón Guerra	1902–1903
War and Navy	José María García Gómez	1903
War and Navy	Manuel Salvador Araujo	1903–1904
War and Navy	Joaquín Garrido	1904–1905
War and Navy	José María García Gómez	1905–1906
War and Navy	Diego Bautista Ferrer	1906
War and Navy	Manuel Salvador Araujo	1906–1907
War and Navy	Diego Bautista Ferrer	1907–1908
Development	José Manuel Hernández	1899
Development	Celestino Peraza	1899
Development	Guillermo Tell Villegas Pulido	1899–1900
Development	Ramón Ayala	1900–1901
Development	Felipe Arocha Gallegos	1901–1902
Development	Arnaldo Morales	1902–1903
Development	José T. Arria	1903
Development	Rafael Garbiras Guzmán	1903–1904
Development	Arnaldo Morales	1904–1905
Development	Diego Bautista Ferrer	1905–1906
Development	Arístides Tellería	1906
Development	Arnaldo Morales	1906
Development	Jesús María Herrera Irigoyen	1906–1908
Public Works	Víctor Rodríguez Párraga	1899
Public Works	Juan Otáñez Maucó	1899–1902
Public Works	Rafael María Carabaño	1902–1903
Public Works	Ricardo Castillo Chapellín	1903
Public Works	Alejandro Rivas Vásquez	1903–1904
Public Works	Ricardo Castillo Chapellín	1904–1906
Public Works	Luis Mata Illas	1906
Public Works	Juan Casanova	1906–1908
Public Instruction	Manuel Clemente Urbaneja	1899–1900
Public Instruction	Félix Quintero	1900–1901
Public Instruction	Tomás Garbiras	1901–1902
Public Instruction	Rafael Monserrate	1902–1903
Public Instruction	Eduardo Blanco	1903–1905
Public Instruction	Arnaldo Morales	1905–1906
Public Instruction	Enrique Siso	1906
Public Instruction	Carlos León	1906
Public Instruction	Eduardo Blanco	1906
Public Instruction	Laureano Villanueva	1906–1907
Public Instruction	José Antonio Baldó	1907–1908
Secretary of Presidency	Celestino Peraza	1899
Secretary of Presidency	Julio Torres Cárdenas	1899–1906
Secretary of Presidency	Lucio Baldó	1906
Secretary of Presidency	José Rafael Revenga	1906–1907
Secretary of Presidency	Rafael Gárbiras Guzmán	1907–1908
Secretary of Presidency	Leopoldo Baptista	1908

== Domestic policy ==
=== Legislative policy ===
In October 1900, Cipriano Castro convened a Constituent Assembly to draft a constitution for a "new republic", which was approved in 1901. The subsequent 1904 Constitution of Venezuela extended the presidential term from 4 to 6 years, reduced the number of federal states to 13, and legalized divorce.

=== Defense ===
In 1901, Castro announced to the National Constituent Assembly that he had increased the army to thirty battalions and augmented the arms reserves to forty thousand European-made rifles. He also decreed the creation of a Naval and Military School to train military personnel.

Cipriano Castro tasked Juan Vicente Gómez with confronting the multiple uprisings against him. The national budget allocated to the war increased to 22%. From 1899 to 1903, there were 372 battles with a total death toll of 20,000.

=== Economy ===
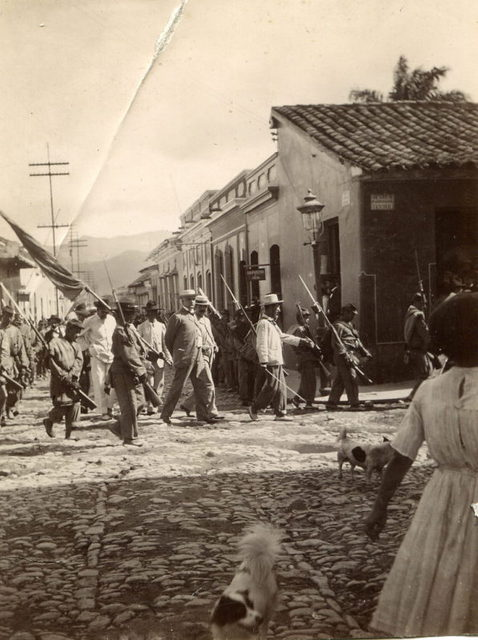
Manuel Antonio Matos and several other bankers were forced to march in chains through Caracas.

In late 1899, President Cipriano Castro exerted pressure on Venezuela's leading bankers to finance his new government's projects. When prominent financiers including Manuel Antonio Matos, the main shareholder of the Bank of Venezuela, refused to grant the requested loan, they were arrested. The bankers were later released after agreeing to provide the financial support demanded by the Castro administration.

=== Electoral policy ===
During Castro's dictatorship, the system of direct voting was dismantled.

=== Health ===
Tuberculosis was a primary public health issue that significantly affected Venezuela. Historical records from the era indicate that during the dictatorship of Cipriano Castro, the mortality rate was approximately 700 deaths per 1,000 inhabitants in cities with populations of fewer than 50,000 residents.

=== Education ===
In 1904, Castro ordered the closure of the University of Zulia (LUZ). Subsequently, in 1905, the University of the Andes (ULA) was restricted to offering only the schools of Political Sciences and Ecclesiastical Sciences under the Public Instruction Code.

=== Media policy ===
Castro's government carried out a harsh crackdown on critical and independent press outlets.

=== Immigration ===
In 1906, the Constitution was amended to prohibit the immigration of black people to Venezuela, the first time racist policies were added to the Constitution.

== Foreign policy ==
U.S. President Theodore Roosevelt requested congressional authorization to invade Venezuela, prompting Castro to sever diplomatic relations with the United States.

== 1908 coup d'état ==
Vice President Juan Vicente Gómez established secret communications with the U.S. government, seeking support for a planned conspiracy against Castro.

When Castro traveled to Berlin for health-related reasons, Gómez, who was acting president in Castro's absence, orchestrated a coup d'état with the assistance of Francisco Linares Alcántara Estévez, whom he later appointed to his cabinet.

== See also ==
- Restorative Liberal Revolution
- History of Venezuela (1908–1958)
- Presidency of Ignacio Andrade
- Dictatorship of Juan Vicente Gómez
