= History of Venezuela (1830–1908) =

History of Venezuela (1830-1908)
- 1830–1908
History of Venezuela (1821-1830)	History of Venezuela (1908-1958)

Following the Venezuelan War of Independence (part of the Spanish American wars of independence), Venezuela gained independence from the Spanish Empire in 1811. After, it became a part of Gran Colombia. Internal tensions led to the dissolution of Gran Colombia in 1830/31, with Venezuela declaring independence in 1830 after the Congress of Valencia. For the rest of the nineteenth century, independent Venezuela saw a range of caudillos (strongmen) compete for power. Leading political figures included José Antonio Páez (a leading figure particularly 1829–1847), Antonio Guzmán Blanco (1870–1887) and Cipriano Castro (1899–1908).

In a succession of rebellions, the Federal War (1858–1863) was particularly bloody, and saw the establishment of the modern system of States of Venezuela (replacing the Provinces of Venezuela largely inherited from the colonial era). The turn of the century saw several notable international crises which contributed to the development of the United States' Monroe Doctrine: the Venezuela Crisis of 1895 under Joaquín Crespo (regarding a territorial dispute with Britain) and the Venezuela Crisis of 1902–1903 (regarding Venezuela's refusal to pay foreign debts) under Cipriano Castro.

== Overview ==
Patterns of political ascendancy, rising, and resurgences developed. The same geographical reasons that had made possible the formation of Venezuela as a distinct national entity separate from New Granada during the colonial period also make Venezuela difficult to govern. Venezuela had various regions: the Andes, the plains that stretched from the border of New Granada to the Orinoco delta, Guayana, the Maracaibo basin, the Coro region, the Barquisimeto region, and central Venezuela, formed by the Caracas-Valencia axis and its surrounding areas. The llanos themselves comprised different sub-regions: the eastern part, which included the Cumaná region (and the island of Margarita by extension), the Apure llanos, and the central and western llanos. Except for the llanos, where there were no geographical barriers between them, the other regions were separated from each other by either outright mountain ranges or rough mountainous terrains. The distinction between the eastern, central and western llanos was due to political precedents and circumstances. The eastern llanos and Guayana had practically fought their own war of independence within the wider war of independence. They also had outlets to the sea. The central and western llanos, which politically were considered extensions of Caracas (except Barinas), had varying access to the central region. The Apure llanos were a prolongation of the central llanos. The western llanos, with the capital in Barinas, had been a province separate from Caracas, but they were in effect (the same as Apure) part of the same social, military, and political landscape.

Independence saw Venezuela possibly the most impoverished country in Spanish America. In 1800 the German naturalist Alexander von Humboldt estimated the population of the province of Venezuela at around one million. A calculation made by Agustin Codazzi, an Italian officer and engineer who chose Venezuela as his homeland, put the population at 810,000 Whether these figures are reliable or not, it is undeniable that after over a decade of incessant warfare, Venezuela's population must have gone down, if not from the wars themselves, from the unstable social conditions they engendered. Venezuela had no means of communication outside of the caminos reales (royal roads) from the colonial period. There existed a stone-paved camino real from Caracas to La Guaira and there were earthen roads that crisscrossed central Venezuela from Caracas to Valencia and from the center to the llanos. In the llanos themselves, there were the trails made by cattle-herders from one town to another. In the rest of Venezuela, roads were no better than mule tracks that followed lines of least resistance. Caracas had started re-building itself when the war for independence ended, but by all measurable social standards the city had deteriorated from its colonial apogee. It had no public buildings of any note. Its cathedral would have been considered a minor church in Mexico. In terms of social organization, Venezuela had inherited the colonial distinctions between the minority ruling whites, the majority un-enfranchised pardos, and the slaves. Government was mostly a local affair. The country was 90% or more rural and the regional caudillos exerted their authority from their own large land holdings through the small towns that acted mostly in name as capitals in all the regions. Despite its relative insignificance as a city, Caracas was the symbol of political power and its control was considered to some extent legitimating. In brief, Venezuela was not a cohesive country, but the political forces that determined its history were not entirely arbitrary or chaotic.

In the seventy years from 1829 to 1899, by one official tally, Venezuela had thirty presidential terms, but this leaves out some transitional presidencies which would boost the figure to 41. In reality, a mere 16 presidents served a total of 28 non-transitional terms. One cannot regard Venezuela as stable during this period: at least thirty insurrections occurred, albeit most of them unsuccessful. The usual pattern was that some local, usually white, caudillo would "recruit" an "army" of 100 or more pardos and make a pompous "revolutionary" proclamation. If this caudillo had some measure of charisma, he could put other caudillos on his side and, with the other recruited pardos, march on Caracas. If he succeeded in seizing power, his continued success depended on his getting other caudillos to put down the minor insurrections that cropped up here and there against him. There were other features of note. In Venezuela, as if the caudillos had a tacit understanding among themselves, there were no political executions with but one minor(?) exception. All a significant caudillo had to fear from failure was either jail, usually for a short term, or exile. However, these privileges did not extend to the pardos, who were easy to recruit, easy to punish, and easy to forget once a caudillo was in power.

Between 1830 and 1899 the series of caudillos who succeeded each other as president came mostly from the llanos, the Eastern region, and from the present-day state of Falcón. From 1899 until 1958, chieftains from the Andean regions held the presidency.

Roughly, one can divide the history of Venezuela in the 19th century into the following periods:

1. the ascendancy of José Antonio Páez (1829–1847), during which he had the support of Carlos Soublette;
2. the Monagas ascendancy (1847–1858)
3. the Federal War (1858–1863)
4. the Federalist period (1863–1870)
5. the Antonio Guzmán Blanco ascendancy, with Joaquin Crespo as its main caudillo supporter (1870–1887)
6. the civilian presidencies and the Crespo ascendancy (1887–1899)

== Páez ascendant (1829–1847) ==
Following Venezuela's separation from Gran Colombia, the Venezuelan congress approved a new constitution and banned Simón Bolívar from his own homeland. Although the 1830 Constitution prescribed democracy, tradition and practical difficulties militated against the actual working of a republican form of government, and in practice an oligarchy governed the nation.

Páez ruled either as president or as the man-behind-the-throne from 1830 to 1846; and later, from 1860 to 1863, as dictator. A distinguished military leader in the independence war and a colleague of Bolívar, Páez had a strong claim to the Presidency, especially as, despite his pardo origins, the white oligarchy in Caracas supported him enthusiastically.

During his first year in office Páez created a three-man Office of Foreign Relations within the Ministry of Finance. It had little occasion to deal with war-related diplomacy between Venezuela and other states, because Venezuela had only giant military forces and they had the primary function of protecting the presidency from internal threats and of maintaining order. The Foreign Office dealt mostly with difficulties involving foreign citizens doing business in Venezuela: especially breaches of contract, damage to persons and property during civil strife, and acts of oppression such as illegal imprisonment of aliens.

Doctor José María Vargas, like Páez a member of the Conservative Party, became president in February 1835. As a civilian, he had the support of some who wanted an alternative to the independence-war military veterans who had predominated in Venezuelan politics. In July 1835 the Revolution of the Reforms led by José Tadeo Monagas outed Vargas, but he returned to power when Páez defeated the rebels. He resigned permanently in April 1836.

Monagas, the leader of the rebellion, had served as a distinguished independence-war general. Although defeated, he suffered few consequences because he had his base in the Eastern llanos, a region where Páez had no effective control. Besides, Monagas had as much right as Páez to count among the "liberators" of Venezuela and he had the additional credential that, whereas Páez had turned his back on Bolivar's Gran Colombia, he, at least in principle, had manifested his allegiance to it until its disintegration was irremediable.

Independence-war general Carlos Soublettea hero of the Venezuelan War of Independence, a Conservative, became president in 1837. Páez succeeded him in 1839 and the Venezuelan nation finally acknowledged its debt to the man to whom it owed its very freedom. In 1842, Bolívar's remains were brought from Santa Marta, Colombia, where he died, to Caracas and entombed in the national cathedral. Soublette took the reins from Páez again in 1843, and governed until 1847.

== Monagas ascendancy (1847–1858) ==
Carlos Soublette proved an honest but lackluster president, in some ways a foil to Páez, and he could not prevent the "election" of Monagas to the presidency in 1847. It is the accepted wisdom that all the "elections" in the Venezuelan 19th century were a sham or non-existent, but this is not exactly accurate. There were elections, but these were held at the municipal level and of course the pardos had no vote. This tradition of indirect elections through local councils would last in Venezuela until 1945.

President Monagas broke with the Conservative Party. In 1848, his supporters assaulted parliament and he imposed personal rule and sent Páez into exile. His younger brother, José Gregorio Monagas, won election as president for the 1851–1855 term and also governed dictatorially. José Tadeo returned as president in 1855 but resigned in March 1858 in the face of an insurrection in Valencia led by Julián Castro and which included elite members of both the Conservative Party and the Liberal Party.

Both brothers governed as Liberals. José Gregorio abolished slavery in 1854, and José Tadeo abolished capital punishment.

The eastern llanos produced many caudillos because its economy was open to international trade and the exports from that region (cattle, hides, coffee) were staples of the Venezuelan economy.

== Federal War (1858–1863) ==
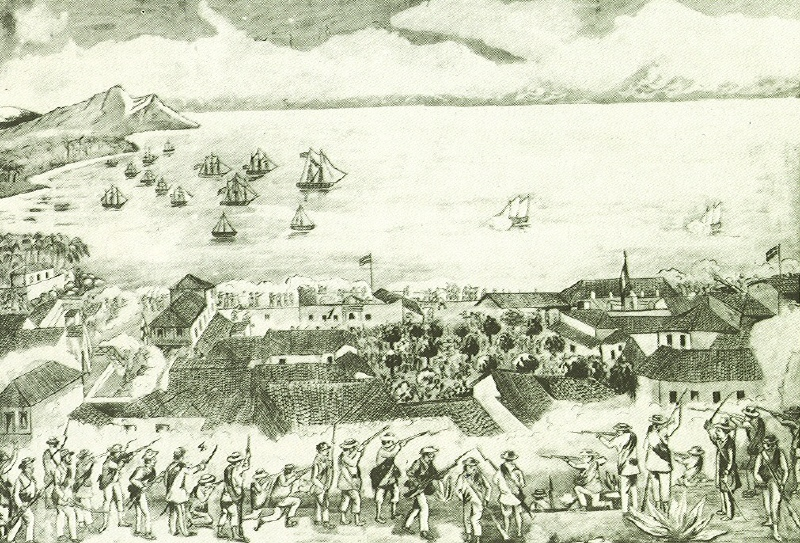
Battle of Maiquetía, during the beginning of the Federal War. 2 September 1859

Three days after José Tadeo Monagas' resignation, Julián Castro seized the Presidency in a coup d'état.

Castro became the first military President who had not fought in the War of Independence. Castro was a creature of the Caracas-Valencia oligarchy and not very effectual. During his presidency, there was a proliferation of aspiring caudillos in Caracas itself and he exiled them all. This was what provoked the Great War of the Caudillos, called in Venezuelan historiography the Guerra Federal or the Federalist War, although federalism was not what these men really had in mind. Castro was not competent either as president or as soldier and he handed power to the civilians of the oligarchy, who were soon overwhelmed by insurrections in the central and western llanos, with Federalist leaders including Ezequiel Zamora.

José Antonio Páez was called back from exile in the US and ruled as dictator from 1861 to 1863, but he was no longer the caudillo he once was and had to surrender to the leader of the federalists, Juan Crisóstomo Falcón. One result of the War of the Caudillos was that the official denomination of Venezuela was changed from "republic" to the "United States of Venezuela", a national name it had, as well as the motto "God and Federation", until a dictator in the mid-20th century changed it back to "republic".

== Federalist period (1863–1870) ==
Falcón had been an excellent caudillo, but he made a feckless president, especially as he wanted to spend a lot of time in his native Coro. He was succeeded by weak presidents from central Venezuela. Jose Ruperto Monagas tried to save the federalist government, but he was no match for the greatest of the guerrilla leaders, Antonio Guzmán Blanco, who had spent much of his public life as Venezuelan ambassador at large. When he came to power, he did not do so in the name of federalism, which he once espoused, but as a liberal. Venezuela was a country of peripheral enclaves, defined by ports through which international commerce was carried on. These enclaves were the source of customs revenues, which, with some foreign loans, were the main fiscal resources of the Venezuelan government. Caracas had the port of La Guaira, to which it was connected by a railroad. Valencia was linked to Puerto Cabello. Maracaibo constituted an enclave in itself. It was the outlet for coffee, mostly by river and lake Maracaibo from Táchira, in the Venezuelan Andes, and from Colombia. The eastern llanos had an excellent natural harbor near Lecheria, but its potential was not discovered until well into the 20th century with the rise of the oil industry. The telegraph had been introduced since the 1850s, but it went from Caracas to Valencia.

== Guzmán Blanco ascendancy (1870–1887) ==
Guzmán Blanco, the most sophisticated Venezuelan president (in office three times between 1870 and 1887) of the 19th century, was also the most charismatic of the caudillos. He adeptly contracted loans for Venezuela, from which he amassed a small fortune. Guzmán Blanco had ambitious goals for Venezuela. He wanted to make Caracas a mini-Paris and he did build some theaters and a capitol, but these projects were on a very minor scale. He was also good at progressive legislation. He declared education free and obligatory for all Venezuelans, but Venezuela still had no roads, so his decree was wishful thinking. He did build the railroad from Caracas to Valencia and tried in other ways to modernize the country, but the facts were stacked against him in a country of over one million square kilometers with a wild and inhospitable topography and its some 1,200,000 inhabitants living mostly in rural areas. The political stability of Venezuela was principally the doing of his principal lieutenant.

== Civilian presidencies and Crespo ascendancy (1887–1899) ==
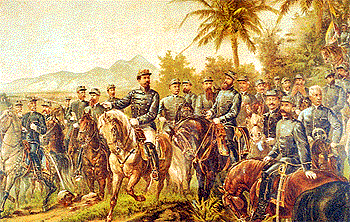
El General Joaquín Crespo y los jefes de la Revolución Legalista, by Arturo Michelena. Joaquín Crespo was President 1884–1886 and 1892–1898.

Guzmán Blanco decided to retire to Paris in 1887 at the age of 59. He died there in 1899. He had left behind statues of himself and other reminders of his prolonged direct and indirect rule. Also, he left a country in relative peace. His appointed successor, Hermógenes López, was a colorless caudillo, who inaugurated some of the projects Guzmán Blanco had started, among them a submarine cable to Curaçao, which linked Venezuela to the rest of the world, and the Valencia-Puerto Cabello railroad. López was replaced by the civilian Juan Pablo Rojas Paúl with Guzmán Blanco's far-away blessing. Joaquín Crespo, who thought he should have been chosen president, went into exile and started planning his own revolution. Rojas Paúl actively promoted an anti-Guzmán popular reaction in Caracas and other cities. He turned power over to another civilian, Raimundo Andueza Palacios, taking up residence in the Yellow House. He left office under duress. His presidential term was due to end in 1892, but he tried to extend it, resulting in resistance known as the Legalist Revolution forgot the cardinal rule of relying on caudillos for support. The German warship SMS Arcona was temporarily sent to Venezuela, where unrest threatened German businesses in the country. She left Wilhelmshaven on 4 May and arrived in La Guaira, Venezuela on 9 June. She was joined the French cruiser Magon as part of an international squadron that included other warships to protect the foreign businesses in Venezuela. The president Andueza Palacio stepped down on 17 June 1892 under pressure from the armed intervention of General Joaquín Crespo. On 1 September 1892 the Dutch cruiser De Ruyter set sail to La Guaira, to support the naval blockade established by French cruiser Magon, the German cruiser SMS Arcona and the Spanish sloop Jorge Juan were already present. All commanders then came on board De Ruyter to coordinate their actions. The SMS Arcona proceeded to Macuto, where attacks on German nationals had occurred, and the ship's presence was sufficient to secure an apology from the Venezuelan government. On 5 September the English screw corvette HMS Canada arrived. On 7 September screw corvette HMS Pylades arrived. On 10 September the gunboat USS Concord arrived, and on the 16th the USS Kearsarge. Promptly the power vacuum was filled by Crespo in October 6, 1892. Crespo immediately took charge of the national executive power and would remain President until 1898. The whole affair ended quietly, with warships of international squadron lift the blockade on the 16th. On 21 June 1893, a new Constitution was signed that would stipulate in its article 63, direct and secret voting, and a Presidential period of maximum four years in its article 71.

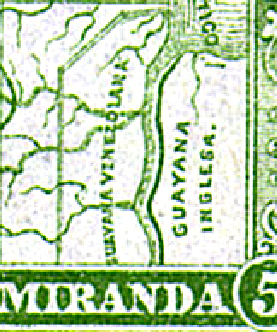
Venezuela supported its claim by printing an 1896 postage stamp with a map showing Guyana up to the east bank of the Essequibo River as "Guayana Venezolana".

Under Crespo, Venezuela experienced an international crisis in what became known as the Venezuela Crisis of 1895. The crisis occurred over Venezuela's longstanding dispute with the United Kingdom about the territory of Essequibo and Guayana Esequiba, which Britain claimed as part of British Guiana and Venezuela saw as Venezuelan territory. As the dispute became a crisis, the key issue became Britain's refusal to include in the proposed international arbitration the territory east of the "Schomburgk Line", which a surveyor had drawn half a century earlier as a boundary between Venezuela and the former Dutch territory of British Guiana. The crisis ultimately saw Britain accept the United States' intervention in the dispute to force arbitration of the entire disputed territory, and tacitly accept the United States' right to intervene under the Monroe Doctrine. In 1897 a tribunal was convened in Washington to decide the matter.

In 1897, the president Crespo supported Ignacio Andrade in the presidential elections against key opponent José Manuel Hernández. Andrade won the election, with Hernandez decrying the results as fraudulent. Ambitious but unassuming, Crespo handed power to the Presidente Andrade in 1898, but was the military mainstay of the government. Hernandez in arms was a serious threat to the government. In the battle of Mata Carmelera Crespo was killed in action but Hernandez was defeated by the general Ramon Guerra. Andrade was left to fend for himself with resultant political turmoil. Other attempted insurrections followed, including one by Carlos Rangel Garviras, head of the Autonomous Party of the Andes from Colombia. He invaded Venezuela with 2,000 men, to be defeated in Capacho and San Josecito. In 1899 a tribunal convened in Paris awarded the bulk of the Essequibo disputed territory to British Guiana.

== Cipriano Castro (1899–1908) ==
Of all the regions of Venezuela, the Andes and Guayana had not participated actively in the many insurrections that had plagued the other parts of Venezuela. The llanos had been the great battleground of most of the confrontations between caudillos, whose struggles spilled over into Barquisimeto. Coro had been the favorite landing site for most of the rebellions, especially the Great War of the Caudillos. Maracaibo at one time tried to go autonomous and had to be taken by arms. Guayana was so under-populated it hardly counted. But the Andes was another story. It was the richest region of Venezuela through the export of coffee. It had a healthful, high-altitude climate. It probably accounted for perhaps half the total population of Venezuela. Malaria and yellow fever and other tropical scourges had become endemic in the llanos. A rebel from Trujillo, the Andean province closest to central Venezuela, had once tried and failed at rebellion. But in the 1890s the Andeans, especially in Táchira, started to show the rest of Venezuela their power. When Crespo was killed, Venezuela entered a period of uncertainty as Andrade was not himself a caudillo and he was Crespo's placeman. In 1899, the Tachirense Cipriano Castro, a short-tempered and highly ambitious man, formed a real army with Andean recruits and the support of his friend Juan Vicente Gómez. Castro met practically no resistance on his march to Caracas. His forces were larger now under the command of Gómez. As was to be expected, the new government was like lighting not one but many fuses to many enterprising, aspiring caudillos. Castro was himself courageous, but he did not need to take the field: he had Gómez, who in two years of active campaigning with his Andean troops put down not only the ongoing rebellions, but even made sure that there were not to be any more rebellions by placing Andean lieutenants and Andean troops in all the regional capitals of Venezuela.

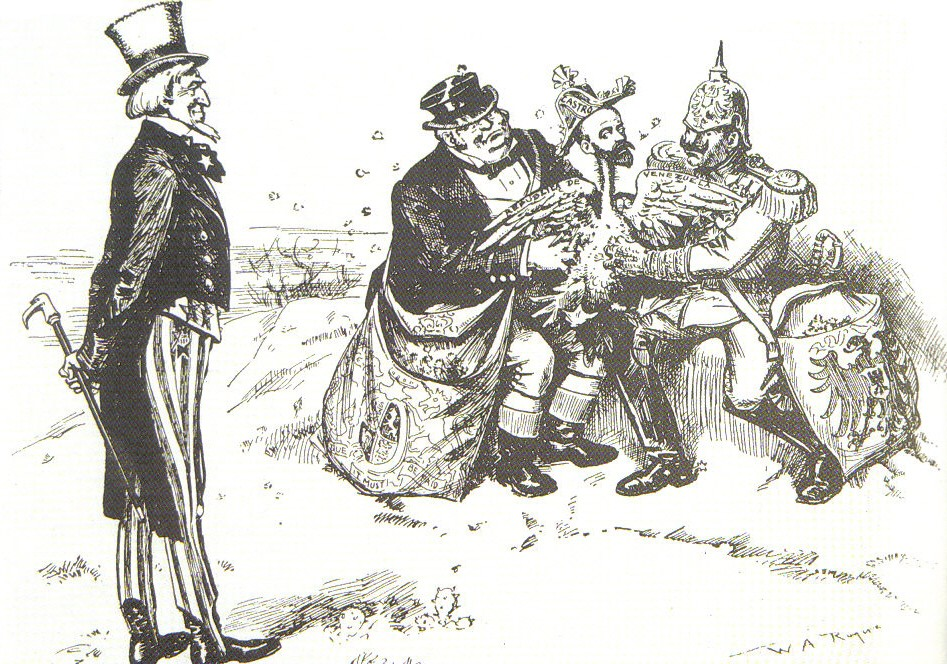
Caricature of Cipriano Castro, by W.A. Rogers, published in the New York Herald, January, 1903. Castro is shown as a thin goose being plucked bare by Britain and Germany, while Uncle Sam looks on.

Few would deny two things about Castro: he was a debauchee with an insatiable taste for cognac and he was a daredevil in foreign relations defying Europe as if he had a navy and adequate coastal defenses. Many Venezuelans consider Castro a great patriot but in fact, when he got embroiled with his Venezuela's European creditors, he did not hesitate to invoke the Monroe Doctrine in defense of his country's sovereignty, just as previous presidents had tried to do in relation to the issues which culminated in the Venezuela Crisis of 1895. Castro had nothing to do with this affair, but he inherited from his predecessors a burden of foreign debt which he refused to honor. The resulting crisis of 1902–3 saw an international fleet of European gunboats blockade Venezuela's coasts. With the Guiana border precedent in mind, Castro invoked again the Monroe Doctrine. Germany was aggressively pursuing its blockade in western Venezuela, where there was a large colony of German merchants in Maracaibo, and this preoccupied the Theodore Roosevelt administration, which told the Germans to back off. But at the same time it told Castro that the Monroe Doctrine did not apply to unpaid debts. The debt question was sent to the Hague Tribunal which faulted Venezuela. Castro was reluctantly forced to start paying up, but the total cancellation of the overdue bills did not occur under his government. Another war, this time with the Netherlands, broke out in late 1908.

In 1908, Castro was too sick to be cured in Venezuela and he left for Germany leaving Gómez in charge. Castro had not gone further than the outer Antilles when Gómez took over the government and forbade Castro from returning with the support of the US Navy. This was the beginning of a regime that lasted until 1935 and is interwoven with the early development of the oil industry, the greatest influence ever on the history of Venezuela.
