= Víctor Rodríguez Párraga =

President of Venezuela in 1899

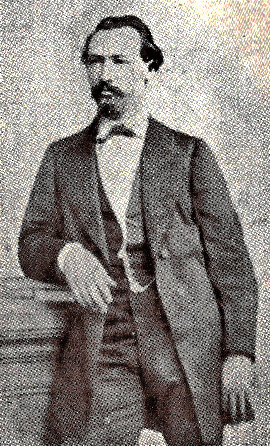
- Víctor Rodríguez during 1860s

President of Venezuela
- In office 20 October 1899 – 23 October 1899
- Preceded by: Ignacio Andrade
- Succeeded by: Cipriano Castro

Personal details
- Born: 13 January 1836 Siquisique, Lara State, Venezuela
- Died: 16 February 1918 (aged 82) Caracas, Venezuela
- Spouse: Luisa Mariño de Rodríguez

Víctor Eladio Rodríguez Párraga (13 January 1836 – 16 February 1918) was a Venezuelan military personage and politician, who served as interim president of Venezuela from 20 to 23 October 1899. His short administration followed that of Ignacio Andrade and preceded that of Cipriano Castro, coinciding with the triumph of the Restorative Liberal Revolution. His parents were José del Rosario Rodríguez and Juana Párraga. Víctor Rodríguez was married to Luisa Mariño de Rodríguez, daughter of Santiago Mariño, with whom he had 6 children.

General Víctor Rodríguez served as head of the Council of Government during the presidency of Ignacio Andrade. On October 20, 1899, he was appointed president of Venezuela following the departure of President Ignacio Andrade from the country due to the Restoration Liberal Revolution. With the arrival of Cipriano Castro in Caracas, Victor Rodriguez handed over the presidency to Castro on October 23. Víctor Rodríguez was appointed Minister of Public Works by the new government and was later commissioned to suppress the uprising of caudillo José Manuel Hernández in December of that same year.
