= Queipa Revolution =

Revolution in Venezuela

- Part of the Venezuelan civil wars
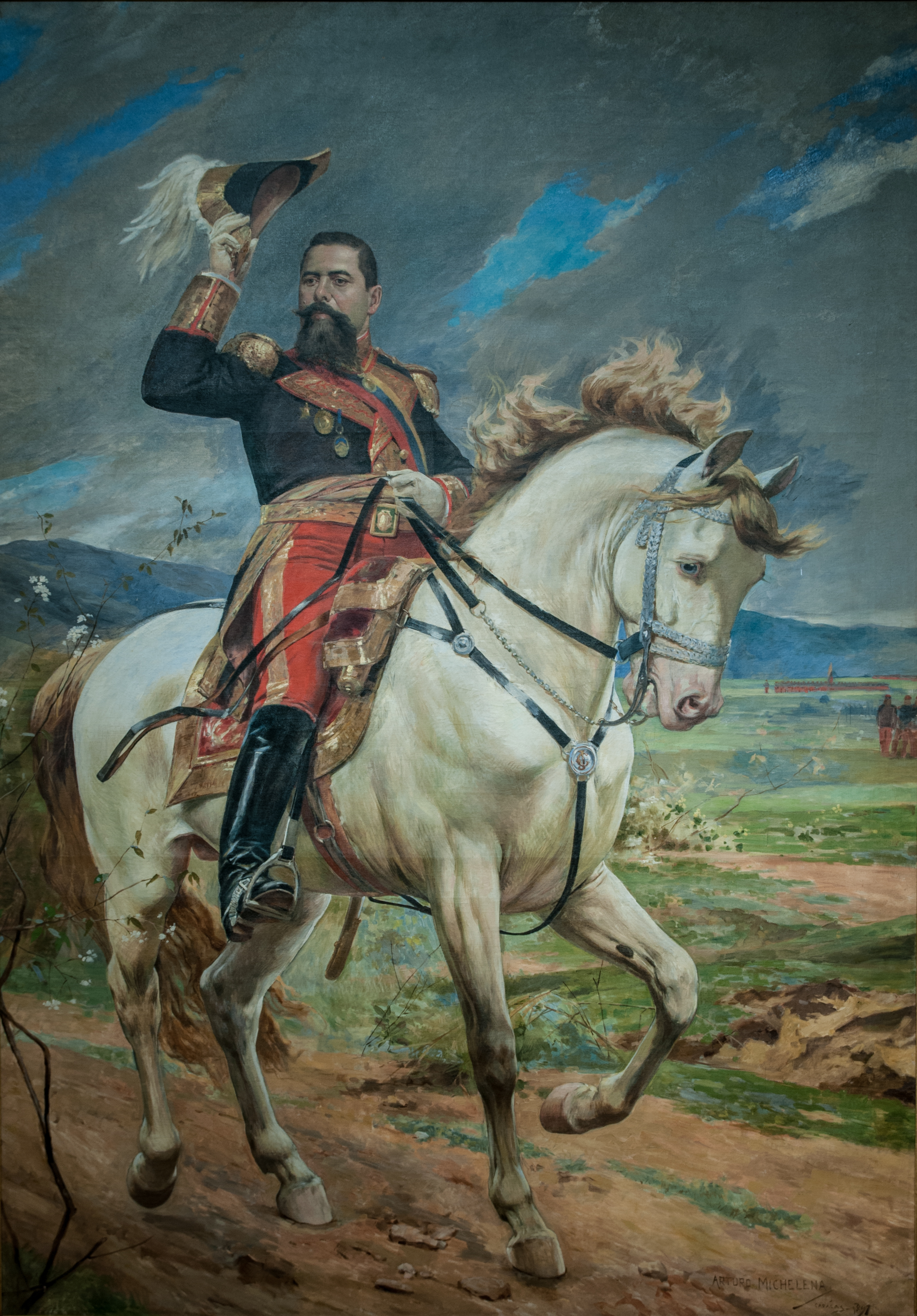
- Equestrian portrait of Joaquín Crespo
Date	2 March 1898 – 12 June 1898
Location	Venezuela
Result	Crespistas Victory Joaquin Crespo dies in combat

Belligerents
Crespistas	Mochistas

Commanders and leaders
Joaquín Crespo† Antonio Fernández Ramón Guerra	José Manuel Hernández Luis Loreto Lima

Units involved
2,000 soldiers	1,600 soldiers

The Queipa Revolution was a military uprising that took place in Venezuela on 2 March 1898, after 1897 when Joaquín Crespo organized electoral fraud to ensure the victory of his ally, Ignacio Andrade. The defeated candidate and leader José Manuel Hernández, better known as Mocho Hernández, rose up against Crespo.

The crespistas and the mochistas clashed in the Battle of Mata Carmelera on 16 April, when Crespo was shot dead in combat. The rebel army quickly grew to 1,600 fighters, while the government had 2,000, including loyalist caudillo militias. The Minister of War, Antonio Fernández, also scored a victory on June 5, defeating 600 rebels. Andrade commissioned Ramón Guerra to carry out the campaign, who defeated and captured Hernández on June 12 in El Hacha, Yaracuy state.

== See also ==
- Restorative Liberal Revolution
