= Presidency of Ignacio Andrade =

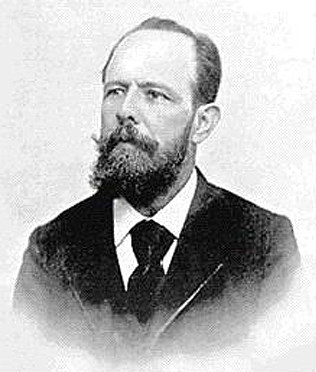
Ignacio Andrade

The presidency of Ignacio Andrade (1898–1899), of Venezuela, is considered to have operated under the influence of Joaquín Crespo, having been consolidated through electoral fraud against José Manuel "El Mocho" Hernández. This administration marked the last government elected under the Liberal Party for the 1898–1902 term.

Following Crespo's death in combat in the same year as Andrade's inauguration, his presidency weakened and ultimately collapsed during the Restorative Liberal Revolution the following year, led by Cipriano Castro. Andrade fled into exile in Puerto Rico.

== Background ==
President Joaquín Crespo maintained significant influence over the country after two terms in office. He had democratized Venezuela by winning clean elections and establishing direct and secret voting. He designated General Ignacio Andrade as his successor, who won through voter intimidation with machete threats securing 406,610 votes against opposition favorite José Manuel "El Mocho" Hernández, who received only 2,203 votes.

Crespo became president of the Greater State of Miranda, intending to return to power through Andrade once his term ended in 1902.

== Domestic policy ==
=== Legislative policy ===
On 22 April 1899, a constitutional reform debate began to revert from 9 to 20 states, which was approved despite opposition from 25 legislators.

=== Economics ===
Andrade's government faced economic difficulties due to a decline in coffee prices. On 20 April 1899, the Law on Foreign Investments was approved, the first of its kind in Venezuela.

== Foreign policy ==
=== France ===
After the death of Antonio Guzmán Blanco, President Andrade signed a decree on 31 July 1899 to transfer his remains from Paris to the National Pantheon. However, this would not occur until a century later.

=== British Empire and Guyana ===
In 1899, the Paris Arbitral Award was signed with the British Empire, mediated by the United States. El Nacional later argued that Andrade "lacked leadership and authority", which—combined with the Restorative Liberal Revolution—resulted in unfavorable terms for Venezuela. The ruling has since been criticized by successive governments.

== Opposition ==
=== 1898 Uprising ===
José Manuel "El Mocho" Hernández led a rebellion from 23 February to 12 June 1898, before being imprisoned in La Hacha.

=== Ramón Guerra's Revolt ===
Ramón Guerra, who had arrested Hernández, also rose against Andrade's government.

=== Restorative Liberal Revolution ===
The Restorative Liberal Revolution, also known as the "Invasion of the 60" (after the initial number of rebels), was an expedition of Venezuelan exiles in Colombia, led by Cipriano Castro, beginning on 23 May 1899. Its goal was to overthrow President Ignacio Andrade.

Following the revolution, Venezuela entered a deep political crisis, weakening the government and leading to its collapse in 1899.

== See also ==
- Dictatorship of Cipriano Castro
