= Liberating Revolution (Venezuela) =

Revolution in Venezuela

- Part of the Venezuelan civil wars and the Thousand Days' War
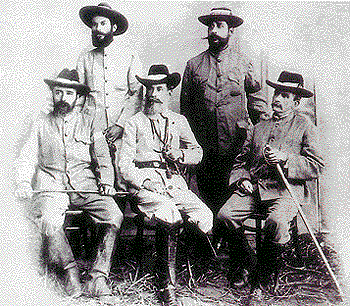
- Some leaders of the revolution: General Matos seated in the center, Lino Duarte (right), Doctor Santos Dominici (left), Manuel Matos Jr. (standing), Epifanio Acosta (standing) photo donated by the family of Dr. Santos Dominici .
Date	19 December 1901 - 22 July 1903
Location	Central, western and eastern Venezuela
Result	Restorative victory; Consolidation of the Andean Hegemony; End of the period of the Venezuelan civil wars

Belligerents
Restorative government	Liberal rebels

Commanders and leaders
Cipriano Castro; Juan Vicente Gómez	Manuel Antonio Matos; Luciano Mendoza; Amábile Solagnie; Roberto Vargas Díaz; Ramón Guerra; Nicolás Rolando; Gregorio Segundo Riera; Juan Pablo Peñaloza; Epifanio Acosta López; José María Acosta López; Alejandro Dúcharne; Horacio Dúcharne; Pedro Dúcharne; Domingo Monagas; Antonio Fernández; Carlos Rangel Garbiras; Rafael Montilla; Eugenio Segundo Riera; Lino Duarte Level; Pablo Guzmán; Pedro Oderiz Gonzalez; Santos Dominici; Tomás Funes; John Boulton; César Vicentini; Zoilo Vidal; José María Ortega Martínez

Units involved
20.000	18.000-20.000

Casualties and losses
- Between 1899 and 1903, in two continuous civil wars, 372 military encounters were fought (210 in the Liberating Revolution), at a cost of 50,000 lives.

The Liberating Revolution was a civil war in Venezuela between 1901 and 1903 in which a coalition of regional caudillos led by the banker Manuel Antonio Matos tried to overthrow the government of Cipriano Castro.

== Background ==
Castro himself had come to power in 1899 after winning another civil war, the Restorative Liberal Revolution, in which he overthrew the constitutional president Ignacio Andrade, establishing a government which he called Restorative. Since then, the new government dedicated itself to initiating a centralist project, canceling the external debt, modernizing the armed forces and allied itself with the most influential caudillos in the country, but thereby weakening many others. To do this, he used the system of alliances created by Antonio Guzmán Blanco to impose central government officials in each of the country's regions. Given this, many caudillos found themselves in the dilemma of, on the one hand, supporting the uprising or risking being isolated and without power for these reforms.

The revolutionaries were financed by Caracas bankers such as the Matos, Boulton and Velutini who had been harassed by President Castro, who had forced them under threat of imprisonment to lend money to the government. Throughout 1901, Castro managed to put down insurrections which had erupted in the states of Bermúdez and Bolívar, and were led by Pablo Guzmán, Horacio and Alejandro Dúcharne, Zoilo Vidal and others. The conflict became internationalized with the invasion of Táchira state by a Colombian offensive in San Cristóbal led by Venezuelan General Carlos Rangel Garbiras, in retaliation for Castro's support for the liberal rebels of Rafael Uribe Uribe in the context of the War of the Thousand Days.

In October, General Rafael Montilla (El Tigre de Guaitó) rebelled in Lara State, but it will finally be in December that the general armed revolt would break out throughout the country. First, it is the veteran Liberal General Luciano Mendoza who raised Aragua and Carabobo, baptizing the movement the Liberating Revolution, that was formed by the various regional caudillos, each with the ability to mobilize and arm masses of peasants in Montoneras bands. Castro reacted immediately and increased the number of troops of the so-called Active Army, also buying modern weapons and a large number of warships and transport.

== Revolution ==
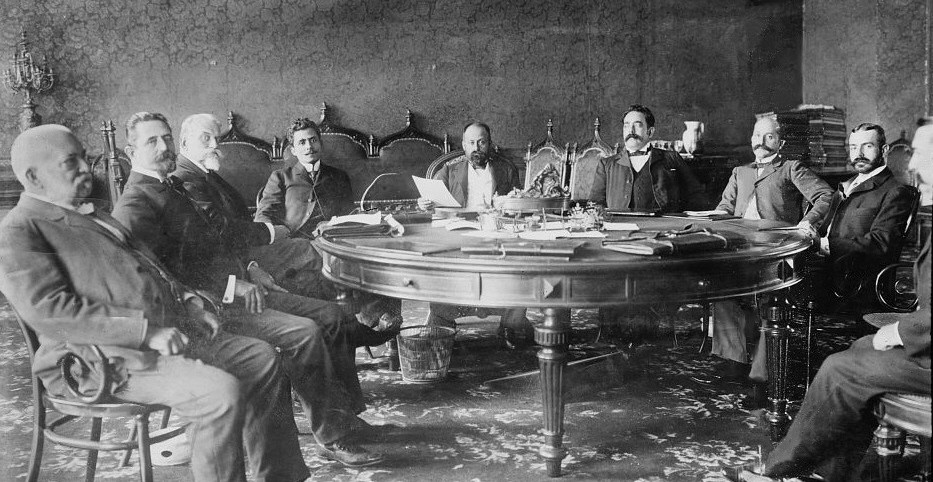
Cipriano Castro and his presidential cabinet

The main leader of the uprising, Manuel Antonio Matos, planned and directed the initial operations from the island of Trinidad, managing to convince several local warlords dissatisfied with the government to join the fight.
In addition, several foreign-owned companies operating in Venezuela were also dissatisfied and had been engaged in litigation with different governments dating back almost to the beginning of their activities in Venezuela. The French Cable Company, the New York & Bermúdez Company and the German Railway, among others, had given Matos $150,000. In December 1901, the international intrigue against President Castro had begun when the German Chancellor Theodor Von Holleben sent a detailed report to the US Secretary of State, John Hay, detailing a debt of Venezuela with the bank "Disconto Gesellschaft" for 33 million bolívares, which the Venezuelan government refused to recognize.
For his part, Matos had bought the ship "Ban Righ" in London, which he renamed the "Libertador", as well as weapons and ammunition. Finally, in January 1902, Matos set sail from the Port of Spain (Trinidad) and, circumventing the surveillance of the national army, landed near Coro, after which the civil war spread throughout the country.

Matos also had a large, heavily armed rebel army with which he was able to seize large territories. By July 1902, only the Miranda, Aragua, and Carabobo states in the center of the country remained in the power of the Castro government; and those of Trujillo, Zulia, Mérida and Táchira in the west. Many battles were fought, the most important was the siege of La Victoria in November 1902. Castro with 9,500 men tried to stop the advance of 14,000 of the revolutionaries who tried to take Caracas by force. Despite the disadvantage, Castro had extremely important military resources, Mauser repeating rifles and rapid-fire Krupp cannons, the first in the country, with which his men obtained greater firepower to break the siege. After a month of combat, the rebels, defeated by Castro, became divided due to internal differences, which in the long run was the cause of their failure, because the Castro government took advantage of their division to defeat each caudillo separately, reconquering the territory they had won. Even so, some active rebel pockets remained, mainly General Nicolás Rolando in central and eastern Venezuela. The remaining rebel forces were hunted down and progressively dismantled by Juan Vicente Gómez, disarming the revolution. With most of the caudillos defeated and his revolution practically extinct, Matos decided to leave the country, embarking for Curaçao.

With the defeat of the Revolution in La Victoria, international capital decided to move from opposing operations to direct intervention, and in this way they began to strangle the national economy. The culminating point was the naval blockade of the Venezuelan ports, on 9 December 1902, by German, English and Italian warships, under the pretext of forcing the government to fulfill debt commitments, especially that contracted for the construction of the railway network by German and British companies. Faced with the violence of the military actions that plunged the country into a serious international crisis, the rebels took advantage of the precarious situation of the government and on 29 December 1902, Amábilis Solagnie and Luciano Mendoza attacked the government positions in Caja de Agua, near Barquisimeto, where they expelled the troops of Leopoldo Baptista and González Pacheco. President Castro requested the intervention of President Roosevelt of the United States as a mediator in compliance with the Monroe Doctrine forcing the withdrawal of European ships according to the Washington Protocol signed on 13 February 1903.

In March 1903, President Castro sent a strong naval and land contingent under the command of General Juan Vicente Gómez to subdue Rolando's forces entrenched in Ciudad Bolívar on the right bank of the Orinoco River. After a long naval siege that led to the landing of troops and the bloody battle of Ciudad Bolívar, General Rolando surrendered along with his staff on 21 July 1903. signaling the official end of the civil war.

== Consequences ==
The defeat of the Liberating Revolution marked the end of the Venezuelan 19th century characterized by political instability and fights between caudillos, where the standard method of coming to power was through armed rebellion. It was also the end of the time of the great Venezuelan civil wars, giving way to a stage of consolidation of the central government under the hegemony of the Andeans, but not before confronting modern foreign powers, as a Venezuelan president had never done before.

The so-called Liberal Restoration Army was institutionalized, becoming an effective and professional National Army in charge of the security of the entire Venezuelan territory. The Navy, so devastated by the naval blockade of 1902, began a long process of modernization and incorporation of units into the fleet.

The proclamation "The Insolent Plant of the Foreigner has Profaned the Sacred Soil of the Homeland", roundly defined a firm position on the part of Cipriano Castro, which generated a nationalist reaction in the country, so important that many of his opponents joined him in opposing the foreign naval blockade (for example: "El Mocho" Hernández, or pacifists like José Gregorio Hernández). This, added to the significant popular mobilization and Latin American sympathy, earned the Venezuelan president high popularity.

The Latin American support, caused by Castro's attitude, was expressed in many different ways: in the Military School of Chile they placed his photo and the cadets gave him a military salute every day; the support of Peru raised the possibility of calling a mobilization in support of Venezuela; The jurist Luis María Drago, Foreign Minister of Argentina, enunciated the famous Drago Doctrine, in which any armed action by foreign powers against any Latin American country, to force it to comply with international debt payment commitments, was classified as unacceptable.

In 1906, Castro punished the international firms involved in the Revolution, to the point that relations were broken with the United States and later also with France and the Netherlands, due to debt differences.

== Bibliography ==
- José Raimundo Porras Pérez (enero-junio de 2011)."Batalla de La Victoria de 1902: táctica, logística, liderazgo y otros aspectos militares de las fuerzas beligerantes venezolanas". Presente y Pasado. Revista de Historia. Año 16. Nº31, páginas 95-122. ISSN 1316-1369.
- Domingo Irwin G. & Ingrid Micett (2008). Caudillos, Militares y Poder: Una Historia Del Pretorianismo en Venezuela. Caracas: Universidad Católica Andrés Bello. ISBN 978-980-244-561-5.
- Édgar Esteves González (2006). Las Guerras de Los Caudillos. Caracas: El Nacional. ISBN 980-388-247-3.

== In popular culture ==
- La planta insolente, a 2017 Venezuelan film.
