= Venezuelan coups d'état =

List of coups d'état in Venezuela

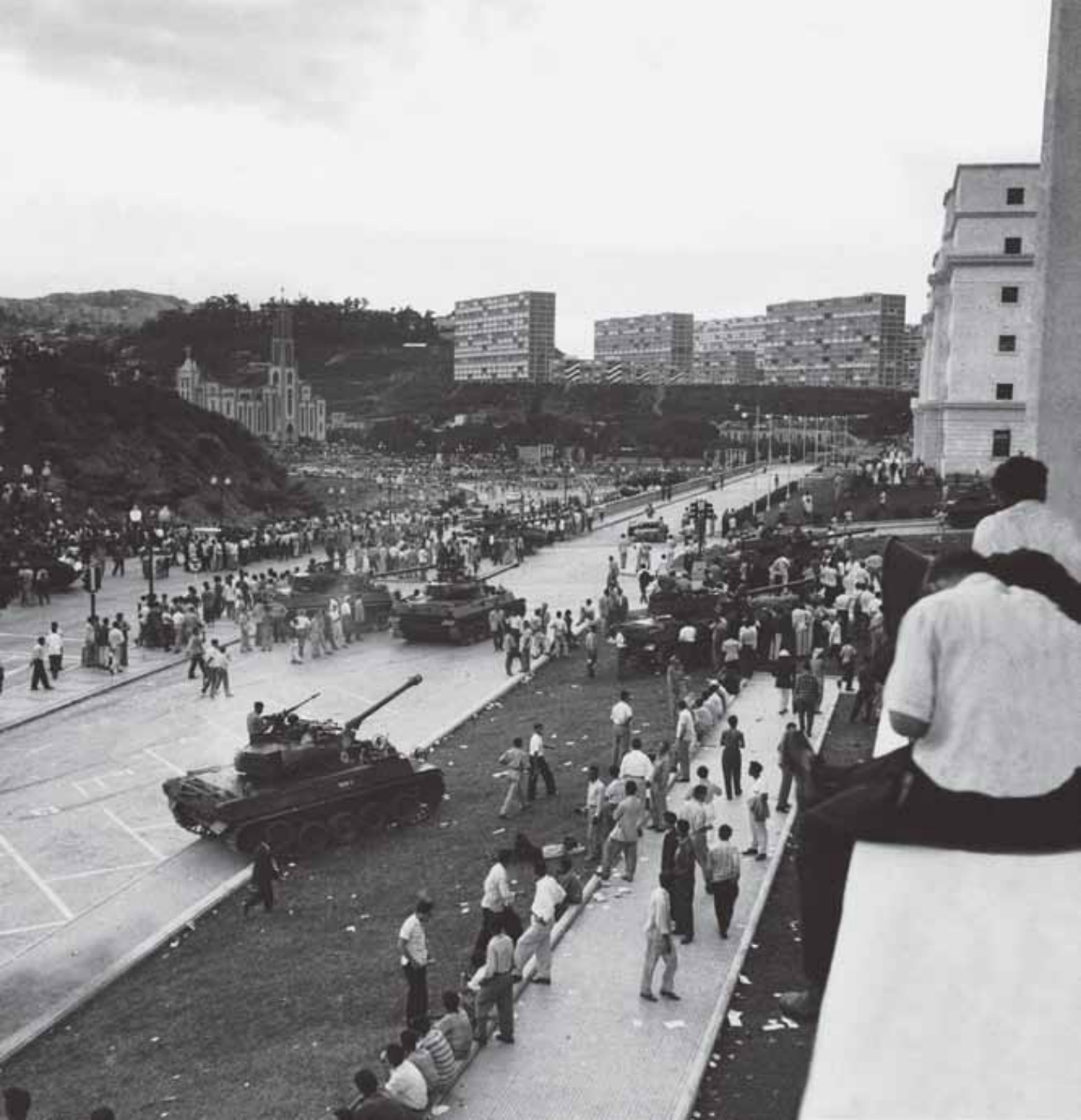
The 1958 Venezuelan coup d'état

Coups d'état in Venezuela have occurred almost since the foundation of the Republic. Throughout the history of Venezuela, insurrections, uprisings, or military or civil revolutions were used to overthrow and replace governments. These coups were performed using force, intimidation, and pseudo-legal methods. Gradually with the consolidation of a democratic system in the country, coups became less and less common.

The first uprising in Venezuela took place in 1835 against the government of José María Vargas, by the conservative Congress and José Antonio Páez. The most recent was the one that took place on 11 April 2002, which caused the brief overthrow of Hugo Chávez and the installation of a de facto government by Pedro Carmona Estanga.

== List of coups ==
#	Coup d'etat	Date	Led by	Government of	Result
1	1861 Venezuelan coup d'état	1861	Manuel Echezuría	Pedro Gual	Successful coup, beginning of the dictatorship of José Antonio Páez
2	1908 coup d'état	19 December 1908	Juan Vicente Gómez, part of the Venezuelan Armed Forces	Cipriano Castro	Successful coup, beginning of the dictatorship of Juan Vicente Gómez
3	1945 coup d'etat	18 October 1945	Marcos Pérez Jiménez, Carlos Delgado Chalbaud, part of the Venezuelan Armed Forces	Isaías Medina Angarita	Successful coup, end of the presidency of Isaías Medina Angarita.
4	1948 coup d'état	24 November 1948	Marcos Pérez Jiménez, Carlos Delgado Chalbaud, Luis Felipe Llobera Páez, part of the Venezuelan Armed Forces	Rómulo Gallegos	Successful coup, end of the Trienio Adeco
5	1958 coup d'état	23 January 1958	Junta Patriótica, Venezuelan Armed Forces	Marcos Pérez Jiménez	Successful coup, beginning of the democracy in Venezuela
6	February 1992 coup d'état	4 February 1992	Hugo Chávez, Francisco Arias Cárdenas, Yoel Acosta Chirinos, Jesús Urdaneta (Revolutionary Bolivarian Movement-200)	Carlos Andrés Pérez	Failed coup
7	November 1992 coup d'état	27 November 1992	Hernán Grüber Odremán, Jesse Chacón, Luis Enrique Cabrera Aguirre, Francisco Visconti Osorio, Venezuelan Revolutionary Party, Red Flag Party	Carlos Andrés Pérez	Failed coup
8	2002 coup d'état	11 April 2002	Part of the Venezuelan Armed Forces, military high command	Hugo Chávez	Failed coup. Chávez is briefly removed from power before being reinstated in his charge

== 1861 coup d'état ==
The 1861 Venezuelan coup d'état was a coup d'état carried out by former president José Antonio Páez against the interim government of Pedro Gual from within his own Conservative Party during the Federal War.

== 1908 coup d'état ==
The coup d'état of 19 December 1908, was a movement led by General Juan Vicente Gómez in Venezuela, by means of which, in the absence of President Cipriano Castro, he took power and would govern dictatorially, either directly by being elected by the president congress or indirectly through civilian puppet governments that obeyed him.

Pleading a conspiracy to assassinate him, Gómez staged the December 1908 coup, leading a brutal dictatorship until his death in 1935.

== October 1945 coup d'état ==
Known by its supporters as the "October Revolution", it was a coup in Venezuela against the government of the president of the republic, Isaías Medina Angarita, carried out by a coalition of the Armed Forces and the Democratic Action political party, resulting in the arrival to the power of Rómulo Betancourt. One of the most controversial aspects of the events of 1945 was the title of "Revolution" with which the members of Democratic Action baptized what was nothing more than a civic-military coup d'état, whose main leaders were Rómulo Betancourt and Marcos Pérez Jiménez.

== 1948 coup d'état ==
The coup d'état of 24 November 1948 was an insurrection of soldiers and politicians against the democratically elected Venezuelan president Rómulo Gallegos who was overthrown and forced into exile, in his place a Military Junta was installed, chaired by Carlos Delgado Chalbaud, and integrated also by lieutenant colonels Marcos Pérez Jiménez and Luis Felipe Llovera Páez, the military junta after the assassination of Delgado Chalbaud in 1950, he would appoint Germán Suárez Flamerich, who would govern until the results of the 1952 elections were ignored, by Pérez Jiménez who, being part of the Junta, declared himself the winner of the elections and began a dictatorship that would be overthrown in 1958.

== January 1958 coup d'état ==
The Coup d'etat of 23 January 1958, also known as the Civic-Military Governing Board of 1958 or the Overthrow of General Marcos Pérez Jiménez, was a historical event that occurred in Venezuela, through which the dictatorship of General Marcos Pérez Jiménez, who was forced to leave the country for the Dominican Republic aboard the presidential plane "La Vaca Sagrada". Pérez Jiménez had been holding the position of president of Venezuela since the early 1950s, with the end of his regime the democratic process began in Venezuela, although before that date there had already been some short experiences or democratic trials such as those of 1947.

== 1992 first coup d'état attempt ==
On 4 February 1992, a group of soldiers carried out an attempted coup in Venezuela against the then constitutional president Carlos Andrés Pérez. The attempt did not achieve its objectives and the rebels surrendered. Among the raised officers who commanded this maneuver were, mainly, four army lieutenant colonels: Hugo Chávez, Francisco Arias Cárdenas, Yoel Acosta Chirinos and Jesús Urdaneta.

This event radically transformed Venezuelan political life, introducing new actors on the scene: of these four protagonists, the first was president from 1999 until his death in 2013; however, Arias has also dabbled in politics: he was elected governor of Zulia state, a presidential candidate in 2000, competing with his own former partner (at the time) Hugo Chávez, and again governor of Zulia in 2013 after reconciling with Chávez; Acosta has kept a low profile and Urdaneta has become a critic of the policies carried out by the Chávez government.

All the participants in this action were taken to prison for this action, their case being later dismissed and released two years later, during the presidency of Rafael Caldera.

== 1992 second coup d'état attempt ==
On 27 November 1992, an unsuccessful coup attempt was carried out in Venezuela against the government of then President Carlos Andrés Pérez, just nine months after another attempt in February of the same year. On this occasion, civilians and military participated in the coup. The most prominent names in this attempt were Hernán Grüber Odremán, Luis Enrique Cabrera Aguirre, Francisco Visconti Osorio, and the Bandera Roja and Tercer Camino political parties.

== April 2002 coup d'état ==
A general civic strike lasting more than three days, called by union and business organizations opposed to the government, was carried out throughout the country, in response to the deteriorating economic situation; in which there were international reserves of 10 billion dollars, a 22% cut in public spending and a 20% devaluation of the currency, plus the removal of the President of the state oil company PDVSA by Hugo Chávez and a call by Pedro Luis Soto, Colonel of Aviation, to the Armed Forces to "save democracy that is being threatened by Hugo Chávez"; were the antecedents prior to the coup d'état. Similarly, the savage repression by state security forces of a peaceful gathering of nearly a million people in the Chuao de Caracas urbanization served as a trigger, as well as the arbitrary imprisonment of some military and civilian leaders who made a speech before these citizens who were demonstrating, at the same time that then President Chávez fired more than 16,000 workers from the state oil company PDVSA through a national media network.

Trade union and business organizations call for a mass rally for 11 April 2002. This rally turned into a march that traveled 11 kilometers from the site of the call to the presidential palace. In the afternoon, clashes broke out near the seat of government between members of the Caracas Metropolitan Police, who were guarding the opposition march, and supporters of the president, leaving 19 dead. The government immediately accused the opposition of having marched without permission to the Miraflores Palace where there were supporters of the ruling party supporting the Government. On the other hand those who led the opposition march accused the government of having planned the violence.

The president ordered the activation of Plan Ávila to control the situation, but this order was ignored by military commanders, who demanded the president's resignation. Minutes after the order, President Chávez called for calm in the population on a national radio and television channel. For their part, the private media decided to divide the screen, an action they considered a journalistic response to the events. While on one screen the President was seen in total calm, on the second screen the chaos caused by the shootings that occurred in Caracas was shown.

In the evening hours of 11 April, the Minister of Defense, General in Chief Lucas Rincón, announced the request and subsequent acceptance of the resignation of President Hugo Chávez. In the early hours of 12 April at the Miraflores Palace, Hugo Chávez surrendered to the insurgent military then was taken to military installations located in Caracas. A few minutes after Chávez's arrest, Pedro Carmona Estanga announced to the country on national television that President Chávez had resigned, and that the military had asked him to lead a provisional government until free elections to elect a new constitutional government. However, President Chávez later stated that he never signed his resignation and that he was kidnapped.

On the afternoon of the 12th, the president of the federation of business associations, Pedro Carmona Estanga, supported by the insurgent military and various sectors of civil society, assumed the presidency through a controversial and illegal decree that dismissed all executive officials that made up the national public powers (TSJ, CNE, National Assembly of Venezuela, Prosecutor's Office, Ombudsman, Comptroller's Office, Ministries) and local (mayors, governors, deputies to municipal and state parliaments) from their positions and also allowed the provisional government to appoint the new members of all the previous positions; It also changed the name of the country from "Bolivarian Republic of Venezuela" to "Republic of Venezuela" and committed the provisional government to convene free, secret and universal general elections for all elected positions and also promised to hand over power to the new government. The Constitutional Court resulting from said elections and to be accountable to it. The decree was called the Act of Constitution of the Government of Democratic Transition and National Unity, which was signed by 400 people who were present at the Miraflores Palace, and supported more by the insurgent military.

On the morning of 13 April, the political police, following orders from the provisional government, persecuted the representatives of the ousted government to make them pay before the Venezuelan justice system and protected a group of demonstrators who were attacking the Cuban embassy in Caracas (this due to that the police could not in any way break into any embassy of another country, but they also did not break up the protesters who attacked it).

That same day an operation was launched to restore constitutional order. The then-attorney general of the Republic, Isaías Rodríguez, declared that a coup d'état has occurred since, among other things, there was no physical evidence of his resignation, however the national television stations took it off the air. Relatives of Hugo Chávez denounced the situation before international media. On the 13th, Raúl Baduel, chief of the army garrison of the city of Maracay, 100 kilometers from the capital, ignored the new government and contacted the military loyal to Hugo Chávez. Supporters of the deposed President hold demonstrations in Caracas demanding his return. The Miraflores palace was taken over by troops loyal to Chavez. He, who had been transferred from one military installation to another (located on La Orchila Island) during the previous 48 hours, was rescued and taken back to Caracas, where he again assumed command.

About eight months later, the Supreme Court of Justice of Venezuela ruled that what had happened was not a "coup d'état" but a "power vacuum", based on what was previously affirmed by the highest military authority in the country, General-in-Chief Lucas Rincón Romero, affected by the Chávez government. For this reason, the masterminds of said military uprising were neither imprisoned nor sentenced, nor were the civilians who had supported them, except for those who had committed crimes against officials of the temporarily deposed government or against public property or private.

== January 2026 deposition ==
In the early hours of 3 January 2026, President Nicolás Maduro was captured during a military infiltration by the United States. Later in the day, United States President Donald Trump announced Maduro and his wife would be put on trial in New York for alleged drug trafficking.

== See also ==
- Venezuelan civil wars
- Caracazo
- History of Venezuela
- Politics of Venezuela
- Elections in Venezuela
