= Dutch–Venezuelan crisis of 1908 =

Diplomatic and trade incident

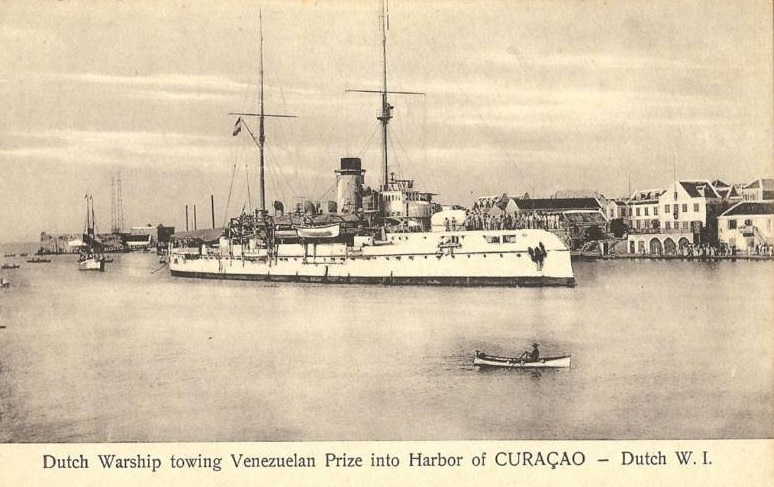
- Gelderland towing a Venezuelan coast guard vessel seized as prize into Willemstad in December 1908.
Date	26 November – 23 December 1908
Location	Venezuela
Result	Dutch victory

Belligerents
Venezuela	Netherlands

Commanders and leaders
Cipriano Castro	Wilhelmina of the Netherlands

Strength
	1 pantserschip (coastal defence ship); 2 protected cruisers

The Dutch–Venezuelan crisis of 1908 was a dispute that broke out between the Netherlands and Venezuela after the Venezuelan president, Cipriano Castro, issued a number of decrees that undermined trade with the Dutch Caribbean island of Curaçao.

Venezuela expelled the Dutch ambassador, prompting a Dutch dispatch of three warships: Jacob van Heemskerck, Gelderland, and Friesland. The Dutch warships had orders to intercept every ship that was sailing under the Venezuelan flag. On 12 December, Gelderland captured the Venezuelan coast guard ship Alix (Alejo in Spanish) off Puerto Cabello. She and another ship, 23 de Mayo, were interned in the harbor of Willemstad.

A few days later, on 19 December 1908, Vice President Juan Vicente Gómez seized power in Caracas during the absence of President Castro, who had left for Berlin for a surgical operation, installing himself as de facto president. Gómez reverted Castro's measures in the following days, and the Netherlands proceeded to withdraw its warships.

The two governments signed a protocol on April 19, 1909 to settle the dispute. However, diplomatic relations between the two countries were not resumed until 1920.

== Footnotes ==
=== Bibliography ===
- Goslinga, Cornelis Ch. (1990). The Dutch in the Caribbean and in Surinam 1791/5-1942. Assen: Van Gorcum. ISBN 90-232-2495-7.
- McBeth, B. S. (2001). Gunboats, Corruption, and Claims: Foreign Intervention in Venezuela, 1899–1900. Santa Barbara: Greenwood. ISBN 9780313313561.
