= Racism in Venezuela =

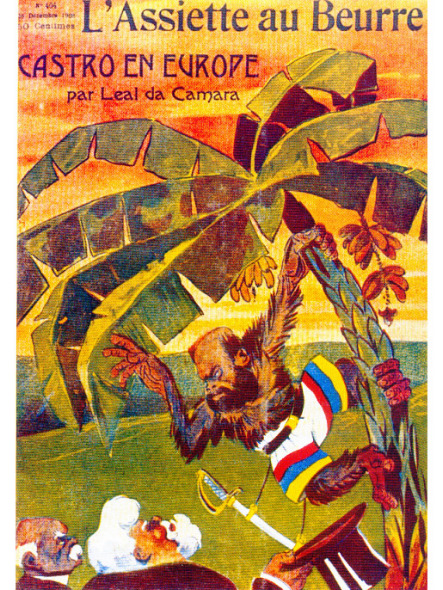
Caricature of Venezuelan President Cipriano Castro in the French magazine L'Assistte au Beure in 1903. Cipriano was nicknamed by some of his critics as the "monkey of Capacho", albeit due to his short limbs.

When the Venezuelan War of Independence started, the Spanish enlisted the Llaneros, playing on their dislike of the criollos of the independence movement. During this time, José Tomás Boves led an army of llaneros which routinely killed white Venezuelans. After several more years of war, the country achieved independence from Spain in 1810.

In Venezuela, like other South American countries, economic inequality often breaks along ethnic and racial lines. A 2013 Swedish academic study stated that Venezuela was the most racist country in the Americas, followed by the Dominican Republic. During an international summit in Caracas in March 2004, Globovisión broadcast remarks by host Leopoldo Castillo in which he compared President of Zimbabwe Robert Mugabe to a monkey, which resulted with condemnation from Algeria, Egypt, Libya, Nigeria, Western Sahara, and South Africa, which they described in a joint statement as a "crude and indecent spectacle, filled with vulgar effects, scornful comments, and endless mockery and overtures with undeniable racist content that offended African peoples and human dignity."
