= 1908 Venezuelan coup d'état =

Bloodless coup d'état in Venezuela

1908 Venezuelan coup d'etat
- Part of the Venezuelan coups d'état
Date	19 December 1908
Location	Venezuela
Result	Successful coup Juan Vicente Gómez took over the presidency of Venezuela during the absence of Cipriano Castro

Commanders and leaders
Juan Vicente Gómez	Cipriano Castro

During the 1908 Venezuelan coup d'état, General Juan Vicente Gómez took power on 19 December during the absence of President Cipriano Castro. He ruled as a dictator until his death in 1935, either directly by having himself elected by Congress or indirectly through civilian puppet governments that obeyed him.

== Background ==
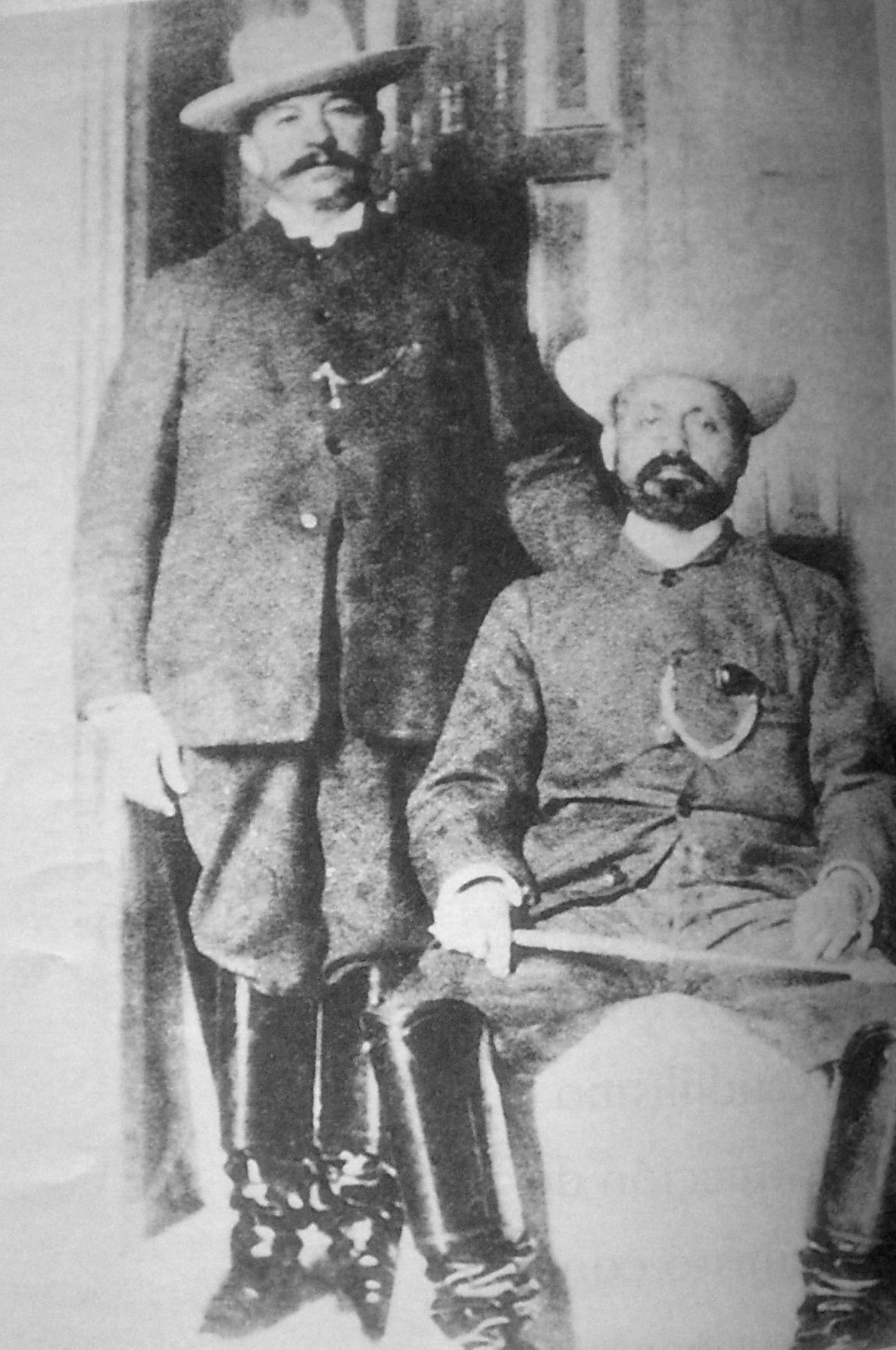
Juan Vicente Gómez and Cipriano Castro

On 4 April 1906, Cipriano Castro announced that he was temporarily separating from the presidency for health reasons, and appointed Juan Vicente Gómez as Acting President.

News began to circulate in mid-1906 about the health problems of President Cipriano Castro, which unleashed fears among the Castro clique that Juan Vicente Gómez would succeed him if he died. In this event known as La Conjura (the plot), circles close to Castro threatened the life of Gómez, who had to change residence on multiple occasions. For this reason, in 1906 and 1907 he spent most of his time in Maracay, away from any official activity, despite being the first vice-president of the Republic.

Cipriano Castro showed his intention to resign indefinitely. Gómez, aware of the maneuver, similarly announced his intention to resign from his post in order to dispel any doubts that might exist about his loyalty. In the public exchange of telegrams that followed (May–June), both Castro and Gómez put their political skills to the test. Finally, on 5 June 1906, they met in La Victoria, thus sealing an official reconciliation. In June 1906, Castro announced that he would resume his position of President again after the events of La Aclamación.

Castro's restored health put an end to "La Conjura", when he realized that his ministers had already chosen his successor, Francisco Linares Alcántara. As a result, Castro marginalized the conspirators on his side and completely restored his confidence in Gómez.

== Development ==
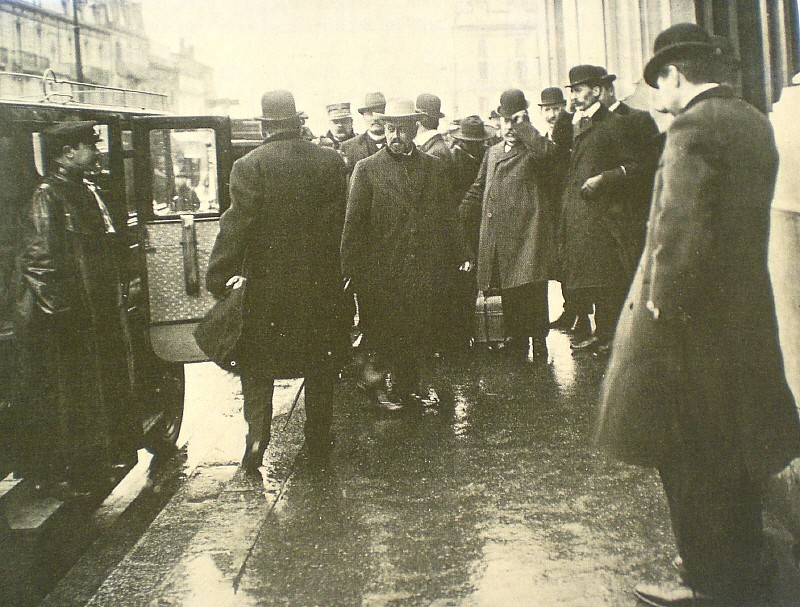
Cipriano Castro in Paris shortly after his surgery.

Shortly after the episode of "La Conjura" was over, Castro's health suffered again, and he was forced to travel to Berlin for surgery. On 24 November 1908, Castro left power. There are ample indications that the anti-Castro reaction was being prepared in the midst of great secrecy and that they were only waiting for the most propitious moment to carry it out.

In the days prior to 19 December, university students, journalists and popular groups staged protest demonstrations. The main target of popular anger was the newspaper El Constitucional of Gumersindo Rivas, spokesman for the Castro regime. Other targets included businesses and homes of government officials about to fall. All were victims of looting and fire.

José Rafael Pocaterra wrote in his Memoirs that since 13 December, the day of the demonstration apparently motivated by the Dutch aggression against their sovereignty, the people of Caracas and the speakers who harangued the protesters in Plaza Bolívar witnessed the attitude of Gómez, as he leaned out, full of fear, onto the balcony of the Casa Amarilla, while the people were already shouting "death" to Castro. Faced with Gómez's attitude, general Juan Pietri Pietri took Gómez by the arm and shouted at his side "death" to Castro. This inflamed the crowd even more, which was already resolved to launch the looting and street protest, which resulted in the first death, when the young José de Jesús Marcano Rojas was shot.

General Gómez had been in charge of the presidency, since at the time he was executive vice president of the Republic. Taking advantage of President Cipriano Castro's departure from the country, he made changes to his status as president in charge of the country, also giving himself special powers over and above what was established in the Venezuelan Constitution of 1904. The coup de mano of 19 December was reduced to a rapid sequence of movements that put an end to a week of hesitations. Juan Vicente Gómez imposed his authority in the military barracks of the city, to later appear in the Yellow House (then the Executive headquarters) where he imprisoned the Minister of the Interior, Rafael López Baralt, and Governor Pedro María Cárdenas.

On 19 December 1908, arguing a conspiracy to assassinate him, under the pretext of a cable, supposedly directed from Berlin by Castro to Governor Pedro María Cárdenas, insinuating the convenience of assassinating Gómez, the reaction began. Gómez quickly removed the military chiefs and ministers of Castro's government, keeping only those who followed him in his coup, and the ministers who remained loyal to Castro were imprisoned. In addition, Gómez ordered that Castro and his supporters be put on trial for an alleged attempt to assassinate him.

Relying on allied merchants and cattle ranchers, Juan Vicente Gómez assumed command as dictator, counting on the support of multiple opponents of the Castro regime and foreign governments with interests in Venezuela. The Secretary of State of the United States lent three battleships and dispatched William I. Buchanan as high commissioner to support Gómez in exchange for a change in Venezuelan foreign investment policy.

== Consequences ==
The coup d'état began a regime that lasted 27 years. Juan Vicente Gómez began his administration by freeing political prisoners and inviting those who remained in exile to return. He also restored freedom of the press, but refused to dissolve Congress and convene a National Constituent Assembly, as the entire country had demanded. Juan Vicente Gómez was initially liberal and respectful of the laws, but eventually, his government became a dictatorship, taking measures to contain and exile the opposition based on supposed revolt against him.

== See also ==
- Restorative Liberal Revolution
- President of Venezuela
- Venezuelan coups d'etat
