= Joaquín Crespo =

Venezuelan military office and politician (1841–1898)

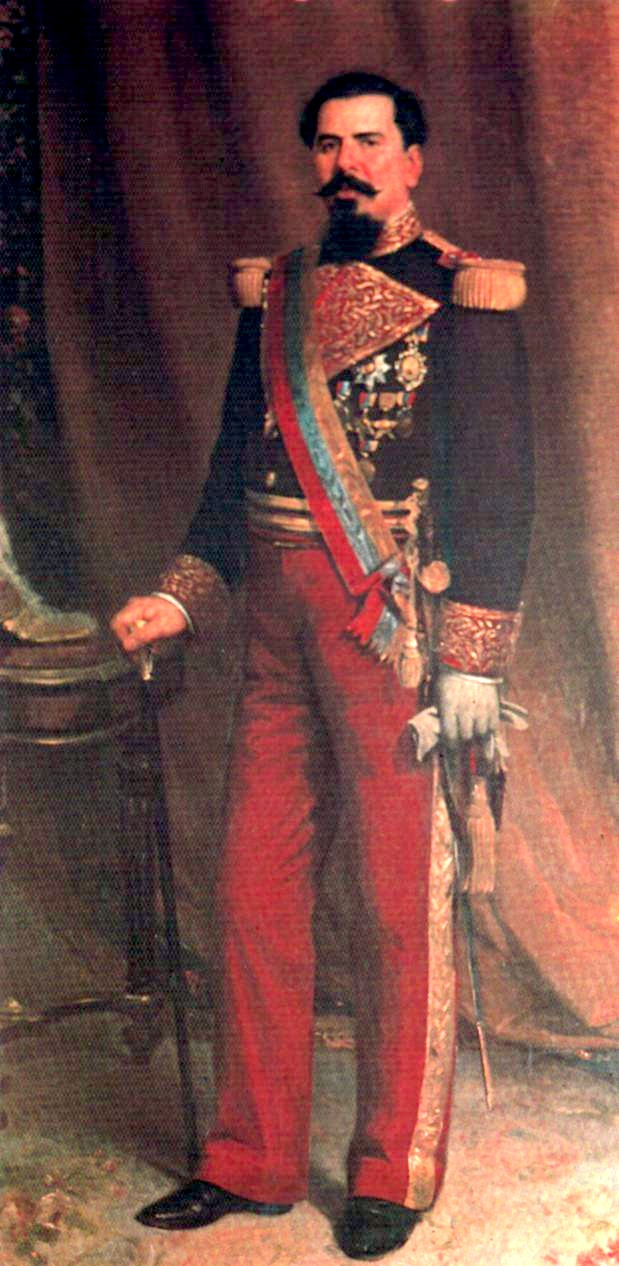
- Portrait by Martín Tovar y Tovar

23rd & 28th President of Venezuela
- In office 26 April 1884 – 15 September 1886
- Preceded by: Antonio Guzmán Blanco
- Succeeded by: Antonio Guzmán Blanco
- In office 7 October 1892 – 28 February 1898
- Preceded by: Guillermo Tell Villegas Pulido
- Succeeded by: Ignacio Andrade

Personal details
- Born: 22 August 1841 San Francisco de Cara, Aragua, State of Venezuela
- Died: 16 April 1898 (aged 56) La Mata Carmelera, Cojedes, Venezuela
- Resting place: Southern General Cemetery
- Party: Liberal Party
- Spouse: Jacinta Parejo
- Parent(s): Parents Leandro Crespo; Maria Aquilina Torres

Military service
- Battles/wars: Conflicts: Venezuelan civil wars; April Revolution; Siege of Caracas (1870); Revindicating Revolution; Battle of La Victoria (1879); Legalist Revolution; Battle of Jobo Mocho; Battle of the Cortada del Guayabo (1892); Battle of Boquerón (1892); Battle of Los Colorados (1892); Queipa Revolution; Battle of La Mata Carmelera †

Joaquín Sinforiano de Jesús Crespo Torres (Spanish pronunciation: [xoaˈkin siɱfoˈɾjano ðe xeˈsus ˈkɾespo ˈtores]; 22 August 1841 – 16 April 1898) was a Venezuelan military officer and politician. A member of the Great Liberal Party of Venezuela, he served as the president of Venezuela from 1884 to 1886 and again from 1892 to 1898. He began his career as a soldier during the Federal War.

== Presidency ==
Joaquín Crespo became president for the first time in 1884. In 1886 Guzmán Blanco returned as president. Crespo went into exile during the presidency of Juan Pablo Rojas Paúl which marked a break from Guzmán Blanco's policies.

In 1888 exilated in Trinidad a group of Venezuelans revolutionaries entered the steamer Bolívar, anchored in Port of Spain, to capture it, but were discovered and forced to disembark. Another group, waiting on land, began an assault and battle against the crew. British soldiers, with fixed bayonets, boarded and subdued the Venezuelan revolutionaries. From Trinidad, Crespo fled to Saint Thomas, a Danish colony in the Virgin Islands archipelago. In Charlotte Amalie, Crespo attempted to invade Venezuela aboard the schooner Ana Jacinta. Defeated by the government, he was imprisoned in La Rotunda prison, later pardoned by President Rojas Paúl with the promise of a temporary retirement from politics. He devoted himself to tending his ranch, before going into exile in Peru.

During the second Joaquín Crespo regime, which began in 1892, a new constitution increased the presidential term. The Venezuelan crisis of 1895 saw Venezuela's longstanding territorial dispute with Great Britain come to a head, with the United States providing diplomatic support to Venezuela. Britain claimed the territory as part of British Guiana while Venezuela saw it as Venezuelan. The disputed border was submitted to international arbitration. The arbitral panel awarded most of the territory to Britain in 1899 after Crespo's death.

== Subsequent career ==
In 1897, Crespo did not campaign for a third presidential term but supported Ignacio Andrade against key opponent Jose Manuel Hernandez. Andrade won the election and inaugurated his term on 28 February, 1898. Hernandez decried the results as fraudulent and took up arms. Hernandez was quickly defeated, with resultant political turmoil.

== Death ==
Crespo, who remained a military mainstay of the government, was killed in battle on 16 April 1898 in the Combat of Mata Carmelera while defending the government of Andrade.

He was buried in the Southern General Cemetery. During the crisis in Venezuela, in 2018, the tomb of Crespo and his wife Jacinta was looted and vandalized, leaving their bodies exposed to the elements.

== Personal life ==
Crespo was married to Jacinta Parejo, who served as First Lady of Venezuela from 1884 to 1886, and 1892–1898.

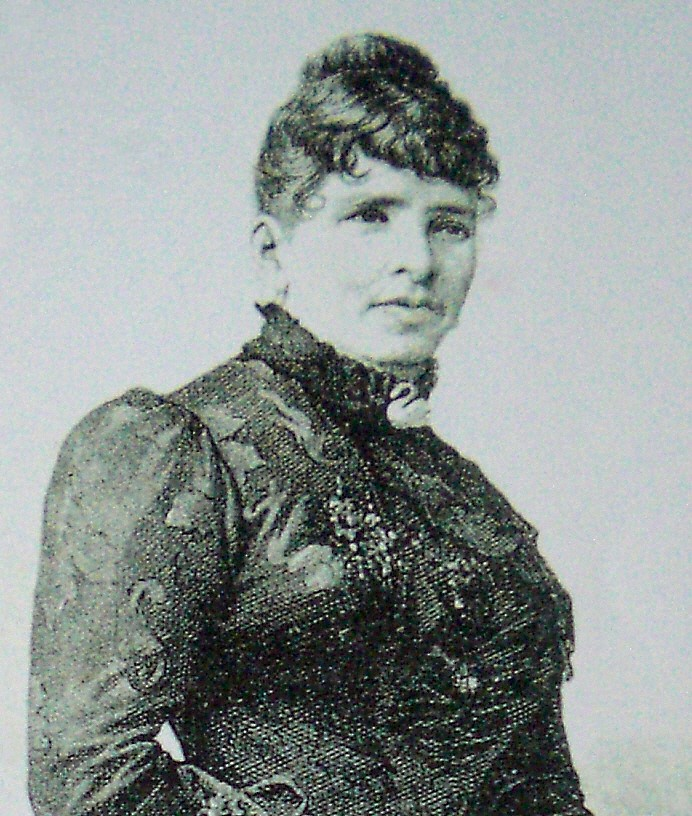
Jacinta Parejo

== See also ==
- List of presidents of Venezuela
- First presidency of Joaquín Crespo
- Second presidency of Joaquín Crespo

Political offices
Preceded by Antonio Guzmán Blanco	President of Venezuela; 1884–1886	Succeeded by Antonio Guzmán Blanco
Preceded by Guillermo Tell Villegas Pulido	President of Venezuela; 1892–1898	Succeeded by Ignacio Andrade
