= Manuel Antonio Matos =

Venezuelan politician

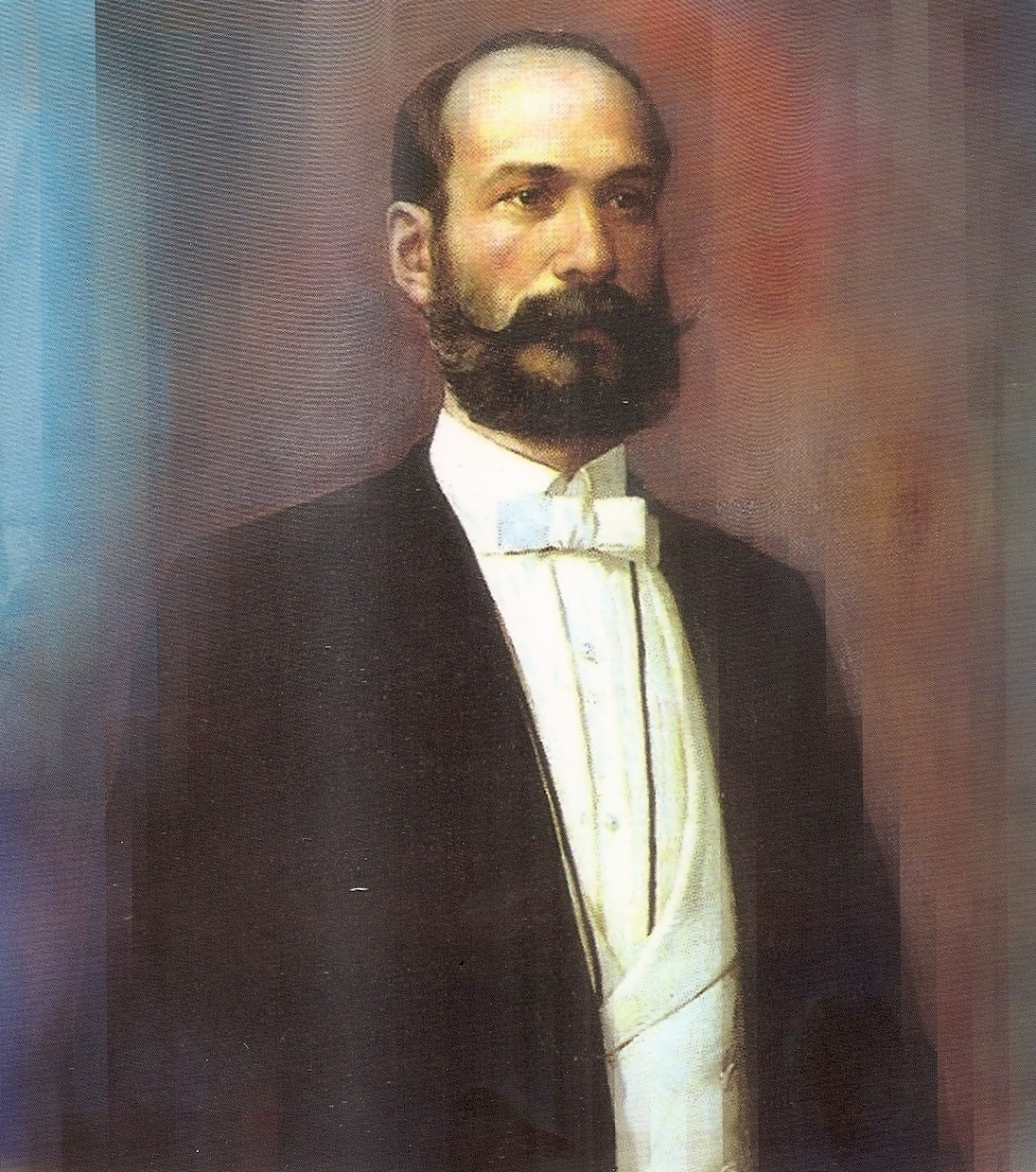
Manuel Antonio Matos

Manuel Antonio Matos Páez Tinoco (8 January 1847 – 5 December 1929) was a Venezuelan politician, banker, military leader and diplomat.

== Biography ==
Matos held a great political and economic influence on the country, during the late 19th and early 20th centuries, having an extraordinary prestige and power in the banking and business fields. In addition to having various investments and influence over foreign and transnational companies operating in Venezuela, held a variety of positions in banking and disposing of what is estimated to be the greatest fortune in the history of Venezuela and of Latin America.

A major figure of the political current denominated Liberalismo Amarillo, he served three times as Minister of Finance (1892, 1895 and 1898), besides being the most powerful promoter of mixed and public banking institutions, conformed to become the arms of investment and financial management of the Treasury of the Republic and the Venezuelan private sector, such as The Caracas Credit Corporation, The Caracas Credit Company, The First Bank of Caracas, The Second Bank of Caracas, The Third Bank of Caracas and The Bank of Venezuela, all financial entities of a core nature for the country that were driven and directed by Matos.

He was the leader of the Revolución Libertadora, a major military movement that took place between 1901 and 1903, with the intention to overthrow Cipriano Castro's government. Major disagreements between president Cipriano Castro and the economic elite evolved into an open war that shook the country and brought the government to the brink of collapse, but after the revolution's defeat suffered in the Siege of La Victoria in November of 1902, the vast network of armies and its extraordinary power was weakened, being a wound that could not be recovered. A few days after, in the midst of this civil war, Germany, the United Kingdom and later Italy instituted what came to be known as the naval blockade of Venezuela in order to force the government to honor its foreign debts. The claims and counter-claims stemming from the conflict would eventually force the three foreign countries to sever diplomatic relations in the ensuing years. The rest of the Revolutionary Army finally was defeated in the battle of Ciudad Bolivar, at which in March of 1903 Matos decides to leave Venezuela, establishing himself in Paris.

However, his power and political preeminence reemerged with the arrival of the dictatorship of Juan Vicente Gómez in 1908, under whose government he served as Minister of Foreign Affairs, taking on the responsibility of organizing the "Centennial of the Independence of Venezuela" in 1911 and directing a strong diplomatic attempt to consolidate relations between Venezuela and the United States, receiving an official visit of the Secretary of State of the United States, Philander C. Knox, with whom he signed numerous bilateral agreements and treaties within the framework of the so-called Dollar Diplomacy sponsored by the President William Howard Taft.

After his departure from the presidential cabinet in 1913, Matos continued to dedicate himself to the formation of a solid banking and financial structure for Venezuela, retiring from public life in 1920 and settling in Paris, where he died nine years later.
