= Cipriano Castro =

President of Venezuela from 1899 to 1908

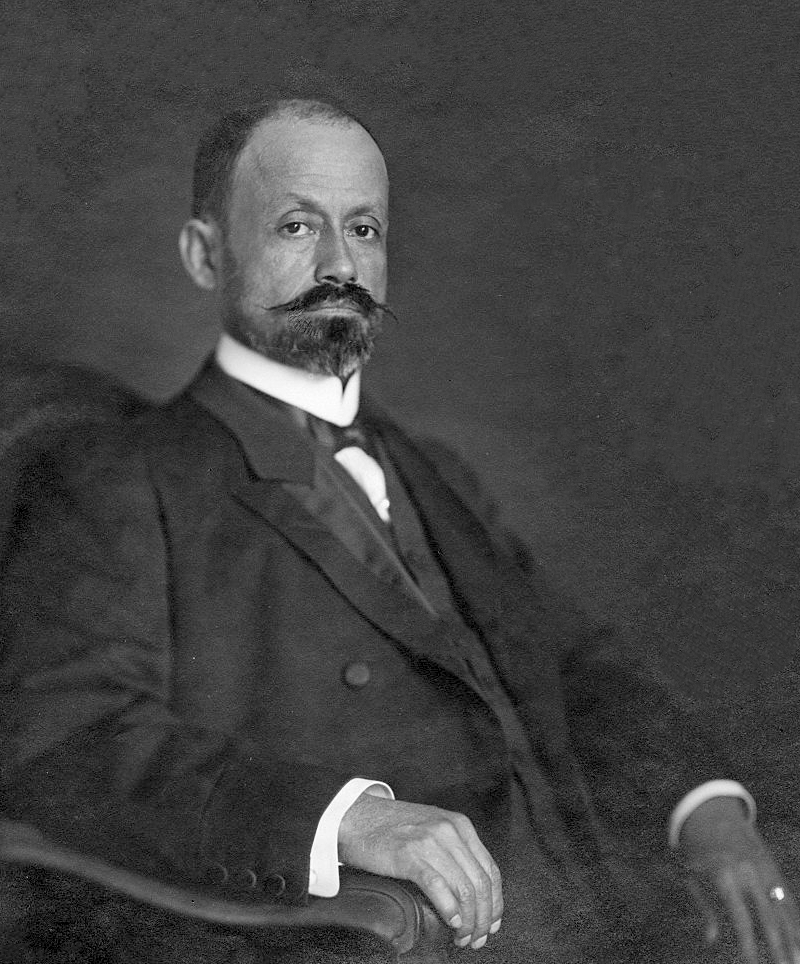
- Castro in 1908

30th President of Venezuela
- In office 20 October 1899 – 19 December 1908
- Vice President: Jesús Ramón Ayala; Juan Vicente Gómez; José Antonio Velutini
- Preceded by: Ignacio Andrade
- Succeeded by: Juan Vicente Gómez

Personal details
- Born: 12 October 1858 Capacho Viejo, Táchira, Venezuela
- Died: 4 December 1924 (aged 66) San Juan, Puerto Rico
- Resting place: National Pantheon of Venezuela
- Spouse: Zoila Rosa Martínez

José Cipriano Castro Ruiz (12 October 1858 – 4 December 1924) was a Venezuelan politician and officer of the military who served as president from 1899 to 1908. He was the first man from the Venezuelan Andes to rule the country, and was the first of four military strongmen from the Andean state of Táchira to rule the country over the next 46 years.

== Early life ==
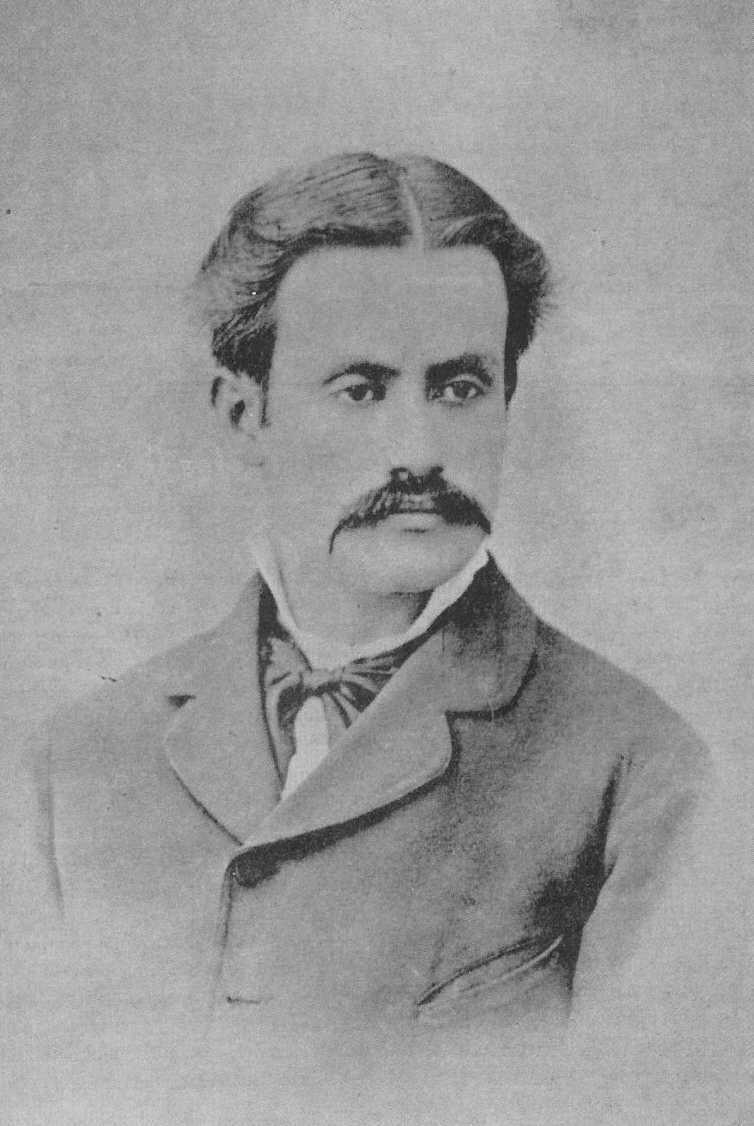
Cipriano Castro at the age of 25

Cipriano Castro was the only son of José Carmen Castro and Pelagia Ruiz. He was born on 12 October 1858 in Capacho Viejo, Táchira. Castro's father was a mid-level farmer and he received an education typical of the tachirense middle-class. His family had significant mercantile and family relations with Colombia, in particular with Cúcuta and Puerto Santander. After studying in his native town and the city of San Cristóbal, he continued his studies at a seminary school in Pamplona, Colombia (1872–1873). He left those studies to return to San Cristóbal, where he began work as employee of a company called Van Dissel, Thies and Ci'a. He also worked as a cowboy in the Andean region. Castro had 21 siblings, the majority of whom were half-siblings on his father's side from relationships after his mother's death. He was very close to his family and sent most of his little brothers to study in Caracas.

=== Military experience and introduction to politics ===
In 1876 Castro opposed the candidacy of general Francisco Alvarado for the presidency of the Táchira state. In 1878 he was working as the manager of the newspaper El Álbum when he participated along with a group of independence advocates in the seizure of San Cristóbal when they refused to submit to the authority of the new president of the state.

In 1884, he got into a disagreement with a parish priest, Juan Ramón Cárdenas in Capacho, which led to his imprisonment in San Cristóbal. After six months, he escaped and took refuge in Cúcuta, where he ran an inn. There he met his future wife, Rosa Zoila Martínez, who would become known as Doña Zoila. In June 1886, he returned to the Táchira as a soldier, accompanying generals Segundo Prato, Buenaventura Macabeo Maldonado and Carlos Rangel Garbiras to again raise the flag of autonomy, much to the dismay of the governor of the Táchira region, General Espíritu Santo Morales. Castro defeated government forces in Capacho Viejo and in Rubio. Promoted to general, himself, Castro began to stand out in the internal politics of Táchira state. It was during the burial of a fellow fighter, Evaristo Jaimes, who had been killed in the earlier fighting that Castro met Juan Vicente Gómez, his future companion in his rise to power. He entered politics and became the governor of his province of Táchira. He organized an army to confront the Legalist Revolution that General Joaquín Crespo had fomented throughout the country against the continuationist policies of President Raimundo Andueza Palacio. Castro launched a military campaign that began with the defeat of 2,000 men under the command of Espíritu Santo Morales and Eliseo Araujo. After successful battles in Palmira and San Juan de Lagunillas, he entered Mérida intending to march on Caracas, but Joaquín Crespo's advance against the Andueza troops, indicative of a massive victory for the revolution, forced him to abandon the campaign. He went into exile in Colombia when the government of Andueza Palacios was overthrown on June 17, 1892. Castro lived in Colombia for seven years, amassing a fortune in illegal cattle trading and recruiting a private army.

== Presidency ==
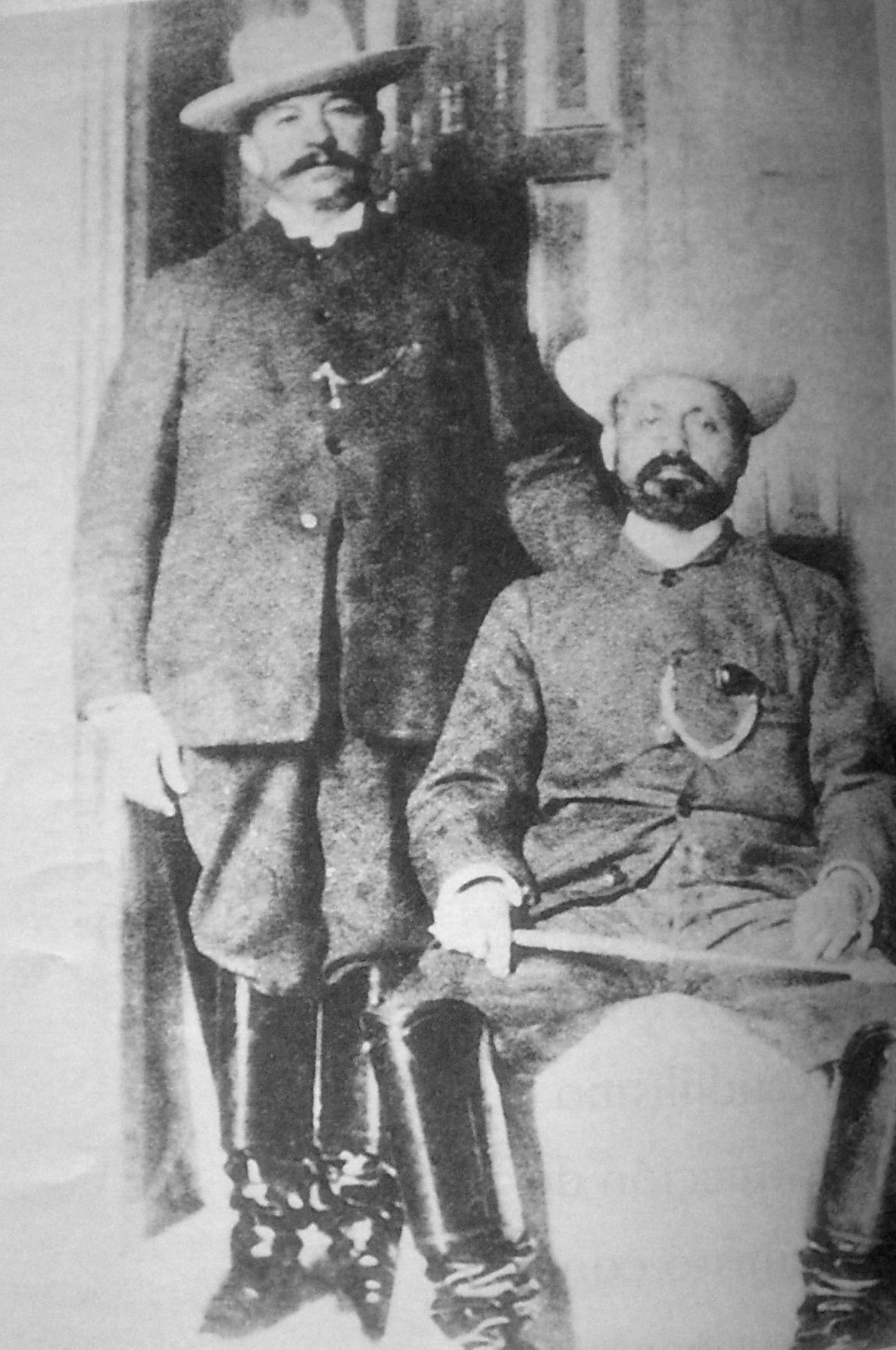
Juan Vicente Gómez and Cipriano Castro

Amassing considerable support from disaffected Venezuelans, Castro's once personal army developed into a strong national army, and he used it to march on Caracas in October 1899 in an event called the Restorative Liberal Revolution, and seize power, installing himself as the supreme military commander.

Once in charge, Castro inaugurated a period of plunder and political disorder having assumed the vacant presidency, after modifying the constitution (1904). He remained president for the period 1899–1908, designating Juan Vicente Gómez his "compadre" as vice-president.

Castro's rule was marked by frequent rebellions, the murder or exile of his opponents, his own extravagant living, and trouble with other nations. His rule was also characterized by disputes with the United States and multiple European powers. Castro was characterized as "a crazy brute" by United States secretary of state Elihu Root and as "probably the worst of Venezuela's many dictators" by historian Edwin Lieuwen. His nine years of despotic and dissolute rule are best known for having provoked numerous foreign interventions, including blockades and bombardments by Dutch, British, German, and Italian naval units seeking to enforce the claims of their citizens against Castro's government.

=== Crisis of 1901–1903 ===
In 1901 the banker Manuel Antonio Matos was the leader of the Liberating Revolution, a major military movement with the intention to overthrow Cipriano Castro's government. Severe disagreements between Castro and the foreign economic elite that support the revolution (as New York and Bermudez Company, Orinoco Shipping Company, Krupp, French Cable, and others) evolved into an open war that shook the country and brought the government to the brink of collapse.

On 2 April 1902, in response to rising political tension between the Netherlands and Venezuela to evacuate the Jews of Coro to Curaçao, the HNLMS Koningin Regentes and the HNLMS Utrecht arrived in the Venezuelan port of La Guaira. Prior to their arrival, the Venezuelan Navy had repeatedly checked Dutch and Antillean merchant ships and the presence of the Dutch warships acted as a deterrent against further actions.

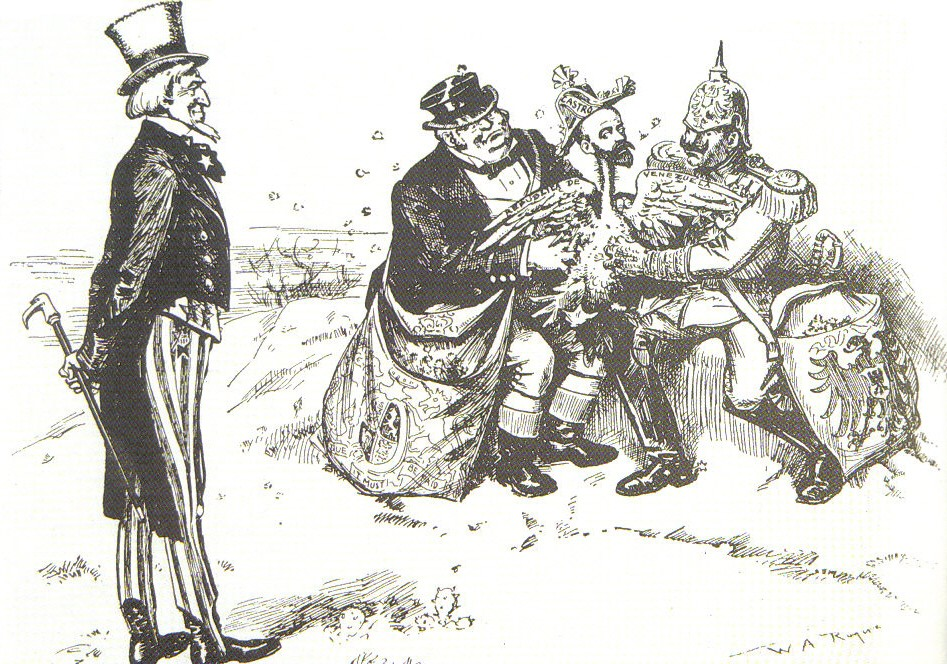
Caricature of Cipriano Castro, by William Allen Rogers, published in the New York Herald, January 1903

In November 1902, the troops at command of Castro himself broke the Siege of La Victoria, weakened the vast network of revolutionaries armies and its extraordinary power.

Few weeks after that, Venezuela saw a naval blockade of several months imposed by Britain, Germany and Italy over Castro's refusal to pay foreign debts and damages suffered by European citizens in the recent Liberating Revolution. Castro assumed that the Monroe Doctrine would see the United States prevent European military intervention, but at the time the government of president Theodore Roosevelt saw the Doctrine as concerning European seizure of territory, rather than intervention per se. With prior promises that no such seizure would occur, the US allowed the action to go ahead without objection. The blockade saw Venezuela's small navy quickly disabled, but Castro refused to give in, and instead agreed in principle to submit some of the claims to international arbitration, which he had previously rejected. Germany initially objected to this, particularly as it felt some claims should be accepted by Venezuela without arbitration.

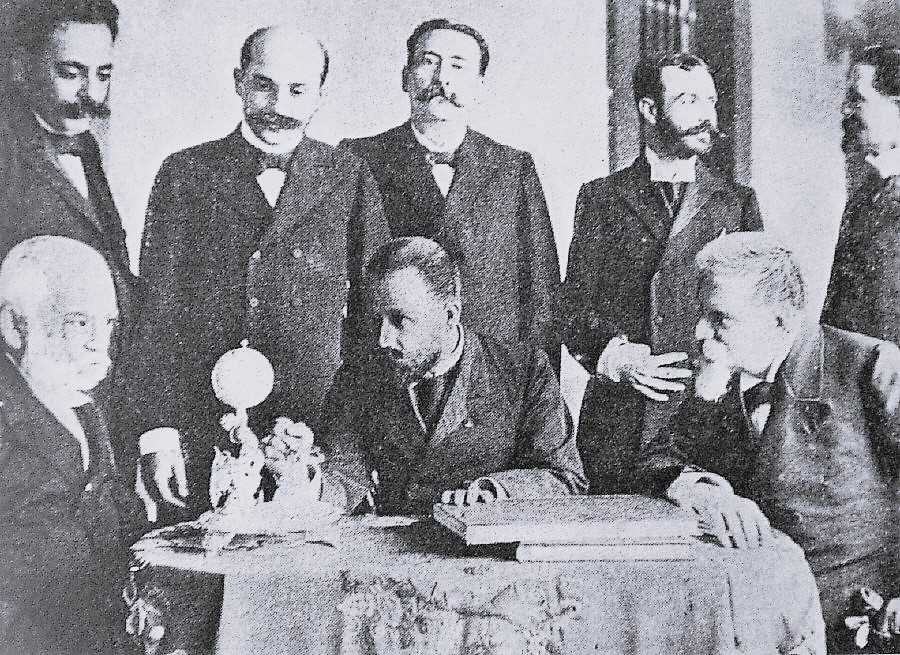
Cipriano Castro and his war cabinet in 1902

When the world press reacted negatively to incidents including the sinking of two Venezuelan ships and the bombardment of the coast, the U.S. pressured the parties to settle, and drew attention to its nearby naval fleet in Puerto Rico at command of Admiral George Dewey. With Castro failing to back down, Roosevelt pressure and increasingly negative British and American press reaction to the affair, the blockading nations agreed to a compromise, but maintained the blockade during negotiations over the details. This led to the signing in Washington of an agreement on 13 February 1903 which saw the blockade lifted, and Venezuela represented by U.S. ambassador Herbert W. Bowen commit 30% of its customs duties to settling claims. When an arbitral tribunal subsequently awarded preferential treatment to the blockading powers against the claims of other nations, the U.S. feared this would encourage future European intervention. The revolutionaries, bearing a wound that could not be healed, succumbing finally in July 1903 in the Battle of Ciudad Bolivar after the siege of government army conducted by General Gomez, with which Matos decides to leave Venezuela, establishing itself in Paris.

However, the blockading nations argued for preferential treatment for their claims, which Venezuela rejected, and on 7 May 1903 a total of ten powers with grievances against Venezuela, including the United States, signed protocols referring the issue to the Permanent Court of Arbitration in The Hague. The Court held on 22 February 1904 that the blockading powers were entitled to preferential treatment in the payment of their claims. Washington disagreed with the decision in principle, and feared it would encourage future European intervention to gain such advantage. As a result, the crisis produced the Roosevelt Corollary to the Monroe Doctrine, described in Roosevelt's 1904 message to Congress. The Corollary asserted a right of the United States to intervene to "stabilize" the economic affairs of small states in the Caribbean and Central America if they were unable to pay their international debts, in order to preclude European intervention to do so. The Venezuela crisis, and in particular the arbitral award, were key in the development of the Corollary.

In 1906, Castro punished the international firms involved in the Revolution to the point that diplomatic relations were broken with the United States and then with France due to debt differences. As a result, Venezuela lost its direct telegraph cable access when the French company that had been providing it was ousted from the country. The DeForest Wireless Telegraph company negotiated with Castro and sent a representative on 18 April 1908 to install stations in five different towns across Venezuela.

In Port of Spain General Antonio Paredes led an insurrection against Castro, and in the winter of 1906 invaded Venezuela by Pedernales. Paredes was captured at Morichal Largo and executed alongside sixteen other dissidents who were launch to the Orinoco river. His brother, Hector Luis Paredes, issued a manifesto from his home in Berlin, Germany. In it, Paredes called on the Venezuelan diaspora to join to oust Castro from power, accusing him of stealing millions from the national treasury and using mercenary force to impede the government.

In 1908, accusing the opposition to his regime, General Castro massively expelled Corsican producers and traders established in and around Carúpano.

=== Dutch–Venezuelan crisis ===
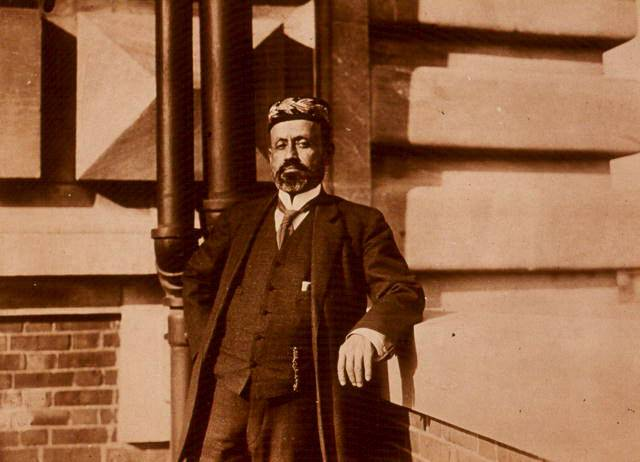
Castro at Ellis Island during his exile, 1913

In 1908, a dispute broke out between the Netherlands and president Castro regime on the grounds of the harboring of refugees in Curaçao. In July, Castro's government broke diplomatic relations with the Netherlands, arguing that the country's chargé d'affaires in Caracas had sent his government negative reports about the situation in Venezuela, some of which were published in the press of that country. Castro subjected Dutch ships to registration and applied tariff measures to them. The Netherlands considered that the series of decrees harmed its trade with Curazao. Venezuela expelled the Dutch ambassador, prompting a Dutch dispatch of three warships – a coastal battleship, the HNLMS Jacob van Heemskerck, and two protected cruisers, the HNLMS Gelderland and the HNLMS Friesland. The Dutch warships had orders to intercept every ship that was sailing under the Venezuelan flag.

On 12 December 1908, the Gelderland captured the Venezuelan gunboat Alix off Puerto Cabello. She and another ship the 23 de Mayo were interned in the harbor of Willemstad. With their overwhelming naval superiority, the Dutch enforced a blockade on Venezuela's ports.

Several popular riots run through the streets of Caracas, protesting the Dutch threats against Venezuela. The demonstrations degenerated into looting of businesses. Among the looted businesses was that of the Dutch merchant Thielen, an important figure in the Castro regime.

=== Overthrow, exile and death ===
Few days later, Castro, who had been seriously ill for four years due to a kidney problem, left for Paris to seek medical treatment for syphilis, leaving the government in the hands of vice president Juan Vicente Gómez, the man who was instrumental in his victories of 1899 and 1903. However, on 19 December 1908, Gómez seized power himself and effectively ended the war with the Netherlands. Relying on allied merchants and ranchers, the Gómez assumed command as dictator, counting on the support of multiple opponents of Castro regime and foreign governments with interests in Venezuela. The United States Secretary of State lent three war battleships and a high commissioner to support Gómez in exchange for a change in Venezuelan foreign investment policy.

A few days later, General Castro left for Berlin, nominally for a surgical operation. After that Castro suffered the harassment of the European powers resentful due to the policy that he had maintained towards them during his 8 years as president of Venezuela.

Without resources to carry out an armed invasion, he went to Madrid and then recovered from his operation in Paris and in Santa Cruz de Tenerife. At the end of 1912 Castro intended to spend a season in the United States, but was captured and vexed by the immigration authorities of Ellis Island which forced him to leave in peremptory terms in February 1913. After having endured all sorts of vicissitudes continuing in Trinidad, Martinique, Paris, and Tenerife, he always sought to unite an armed force that would attempt to penetrate the country and return him to power. He traveled to Cuba, Washington, and back to Trinidad, where he remained from 1913 to 1916. This year, he returned to New York, still unsuccessfully seeking diplomatic support to regain power. In 1917, he was back in Trinidad. The following year, he moved to Puerto Rico without having managed to overcome the thorn of having lost power and regain it from the hands of the man who had staged a coup d'état against him in 1908: his godfather, Juan Vicente Gómez. He finally settled with his wife in Santurce, Puerto Rico in 1918, under close surveillance by spies sent by Gómez, who assumed the Venezuelan presidency.

Castro spent the rest of his life in exile in Puerto Rico, making several plots to return to power — none of which were successful. Castro died on 4 December 1924, in Santurce.

== Cipriano Castro cabinet (1899–1908) ==
Ministries
OFFICE	NAME	TERM
President	Cipriano Castro	1899–1908
Home Affairs	Juan Francisco Castillo	1899–1900
	Rafael Cabrera Malo	1900–1901
	José Antonio Velutini	1901–1902
	Rafael López Baralt	1902–1903
	Leopoldo Baptista	1903–1907
	Julio Torres Cárdenas	1907
	Rafael López Baralt	1907–1908
Outer Relations	Raimundo Andueza Palacio	1899–1900
	Eduardo Blanco	1900–1901
	Jacinto Regino Pachano	1901–1902
	Diego Bautista Ferrer	1902–1903
	Alejandro Urbaneja	1903
	Gustavo Sanabria	1903–1905
	Alejandro Ibarra	1905–1906
	José de Jesús Paúl	1906–1908
Finance	Ramón Tello Mendoza	1899–1903
	José Cecilio De Castro	1903–1906
	Francisco de Sales Pérez	1906
	Gustavo Sanabria	1906
	Eduardo Celis	1906–1907
	Arnaldo Morales	1906–1907
War and Navy	José Ignacio Pulido	1899–1902
	Ramón Guerra	1902–1903
	José María García Gómez	1903
	Manuel Salvador Araujo	1903–1904
	Joaquín Garrido	1904–1905
	José María García Gómez	1905–1906
	Diego Bautista Ferrer	1906
	Manuel Salvador Araujo	1906–1907
	Diego Bautista Ferrer	1907–1908
Development	José Manuel Hernández	1899
	Celestino Peraza	1899
	Guillermo Tell Villegas Pulido	1899–1900
	Ramón Ayala	1900–1901
	Felipe Arocha Gallegos	1901–1902
	Arnaldo Morales	1902–1903
	José T. Arria	1903
	Rafael Garbiras Guzmán	1903–1904
	Arnaldo Morales	1904–1905
	Diego Bautista Ferrer	1905–1906
	Arístides Tellería	1906
	Arnaldo Morales	1906
	Jesús María Herrera Irigoyen	1906–1908
Public Works	Víctor Rodríguez Párraga	1899
	Juan Otáñez Maucó	1899–1902
	Rafael María Carabaño	1902–1903
	Ricardo Castillo Chapellín	1903
	Alejandro Rivas Vásquez	1903–1904
	Ricardo Castillo Chapellín	1904–1906
	Luis Mata Illas	1906
	Juan Casanova	1906–1908
Public Instruction	Manuel Clemente Urbaneja	1899–1900
	Félix Quintero	1900–1901
	Tomás Garbiras	1901–1902
	Rafael Monserrate	1902–1903
	Eduardo Blanco	1903–1905
	Arnaldo Morales	1905–1906
	Enrique Siso	1906
	Carlos León	1906
	Eduardo Blanco	1906
	Laureano Villanueva	1906–1907
	José Antonio Baldó	1907–1908
Secretary of Presidency	Celestino Peraza	1899
	Julio Torres Cárdenas	1899–1906
	Lucio Baldó	1906
	José Rafael Revenga	1906–1907
	Rafael Gárbiras Guzmán	1907–1908
	Leopoldo Baptista	1908

== Personal life ==
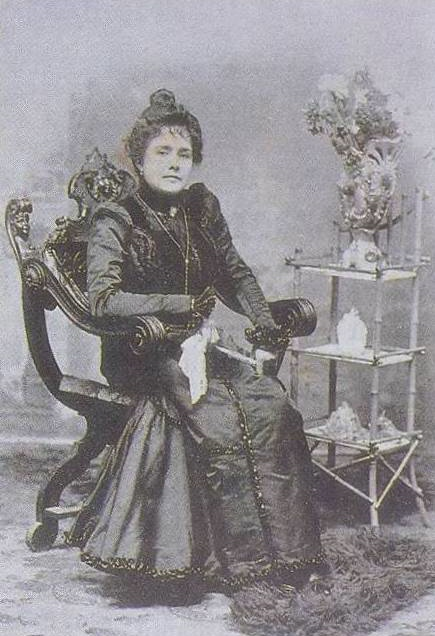
Zoila Rosa Martínez

Castro was married to Zoila Rosa Martínez in October 1886 when she was only 16 years of age. She served as First Lady of Venezuela from 1899 to 1908. She was sometimes known as Zoila de Castro.

She died in Caracas in 1952.

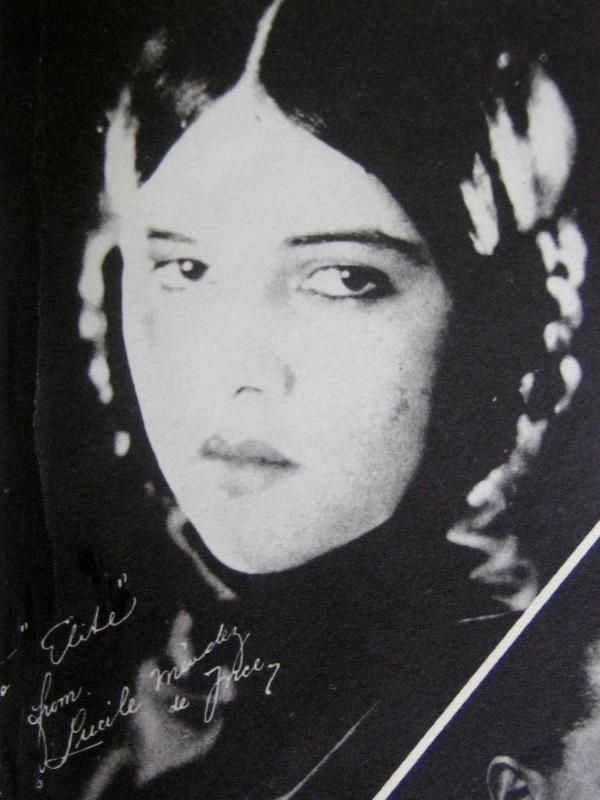
Lucille Mendez

Castro's daughter, Rosa Castro Martínez, was born on 31 January 1906. She adopted the stage name Lucille Méndez, and became the first Venezuelan actress in Hollywood silent movies. Director Ralph Ince suggested the stage name, the same as his former wife. Rosa and Ralph married on 7 July 1926; afterwards, her Spanish performances billed her as Rosa Castro, though she continued to be listed as Méndez in films recorded for English-speaking audiences.

Méndez died in San Diego, California on 24 May 2008 at the age of 102.

Hs brother Celestino Castro as Provisional president of the Tachira state (11.8.1900), is appointed commander-in-chief of the government forces in charge of combating the invasion of the General Carlos Rangel Garbiras from Colombia (July 1901) and assumes the role of commander of San Cristobal in the battle that culminates in the defeat of the invaders (26.7.1901). In February 1902, he managed to intercept in Las Cumbres the invasion of General Emilio Fernández from Colombia. He keeps to brother scrupulously informed of the events on the border, taking care to recruit and send troops to the center of Venezuela that help fight the forces of the Liberating Revolution (1902–1903). As militar commander of the state of Táchira (May 1904), he is appointed first vice president of that state (December 1907). He fled to Colombia after the coup d'état of 19 December 1908 and remains in exile until his death in 1924.

== See also ==
- Presidents of Venezuela
- Dictatorship of Cipriano Castro

Political offices
Preceded by Ignacio Andrade	President of Venezuela; 1899 – 1908	Succeeded by Juan Vicente Gómez
