= José Manuel Hernández =

Venezuelan politician (1853–1921)

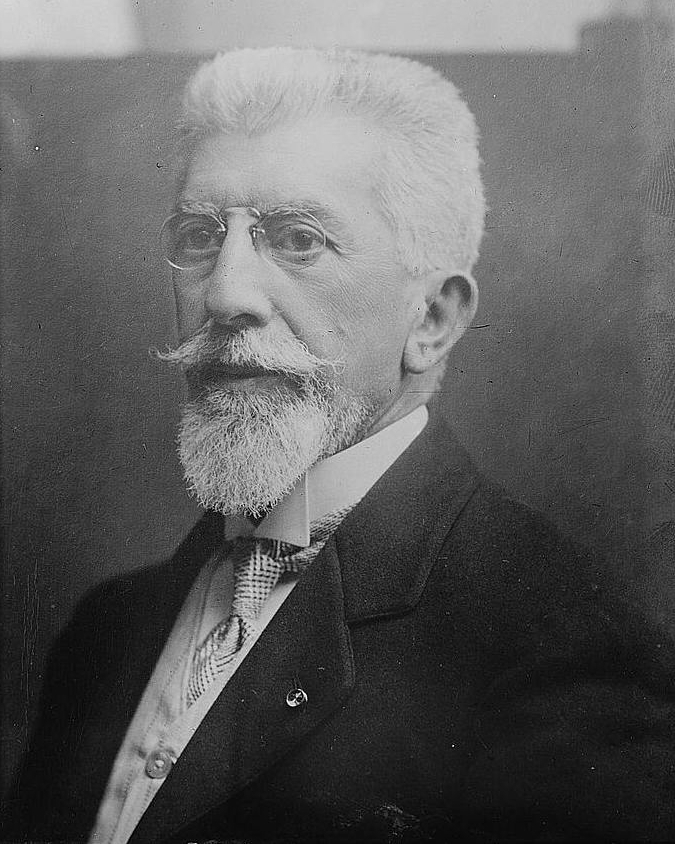
- General, Politician, Caudillo
- Born: 1853; Caracas, Venezuela
- Died: August 25, 1921 (aged 67–68); New York City, United States

José Manuel Hernández (1853 – 25 August 1921) was a popular Venezuelan caudillo, army general, congressman, presidential candidate and cabinet member who was also involved in numerous insurrections.

== Biography ==
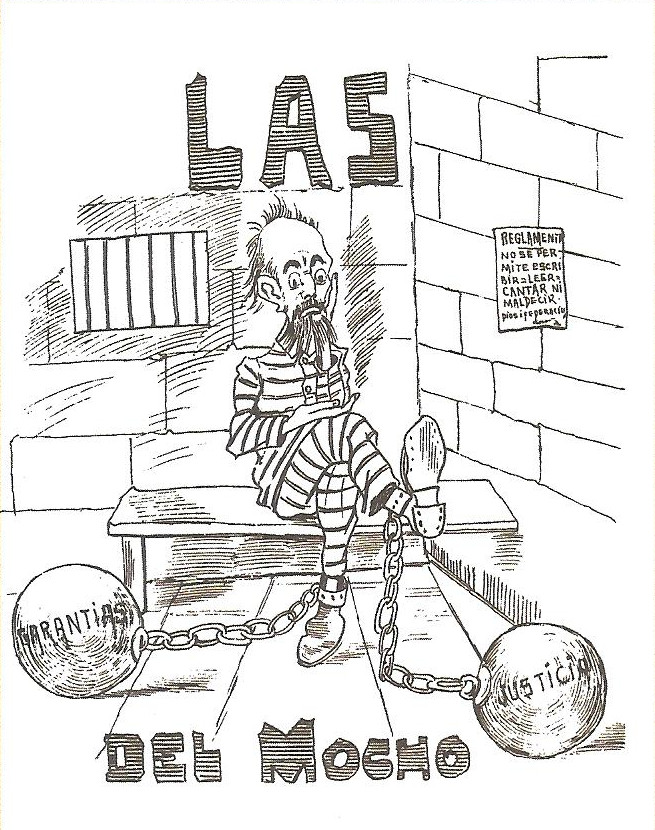
Caricature of an imprisoned Hernández, 1898

Hernández was born in Caracas, Venezuela.

Called El Mocho (the hand-less) after his right hand was crippled as a result from a battle wound, he is particularly well known for his numerous rebellions and imprisonments and for the modernity of his presidential campaign, which involved rallies, meetings, campaign posters and tours around the country.

In 1911 he was exiled by the Juan Vicente Gómez regime; subsequently he lived in Puerto Rico, Cuba and the United States, where he died in New York City in 1921.
