= Venezuelan civil wars =

List of civil wars in Venezuela

The Venezuelan civil wars were a long series of conflicts that devastated the country during most of the 19th century.

== Historical summary ==
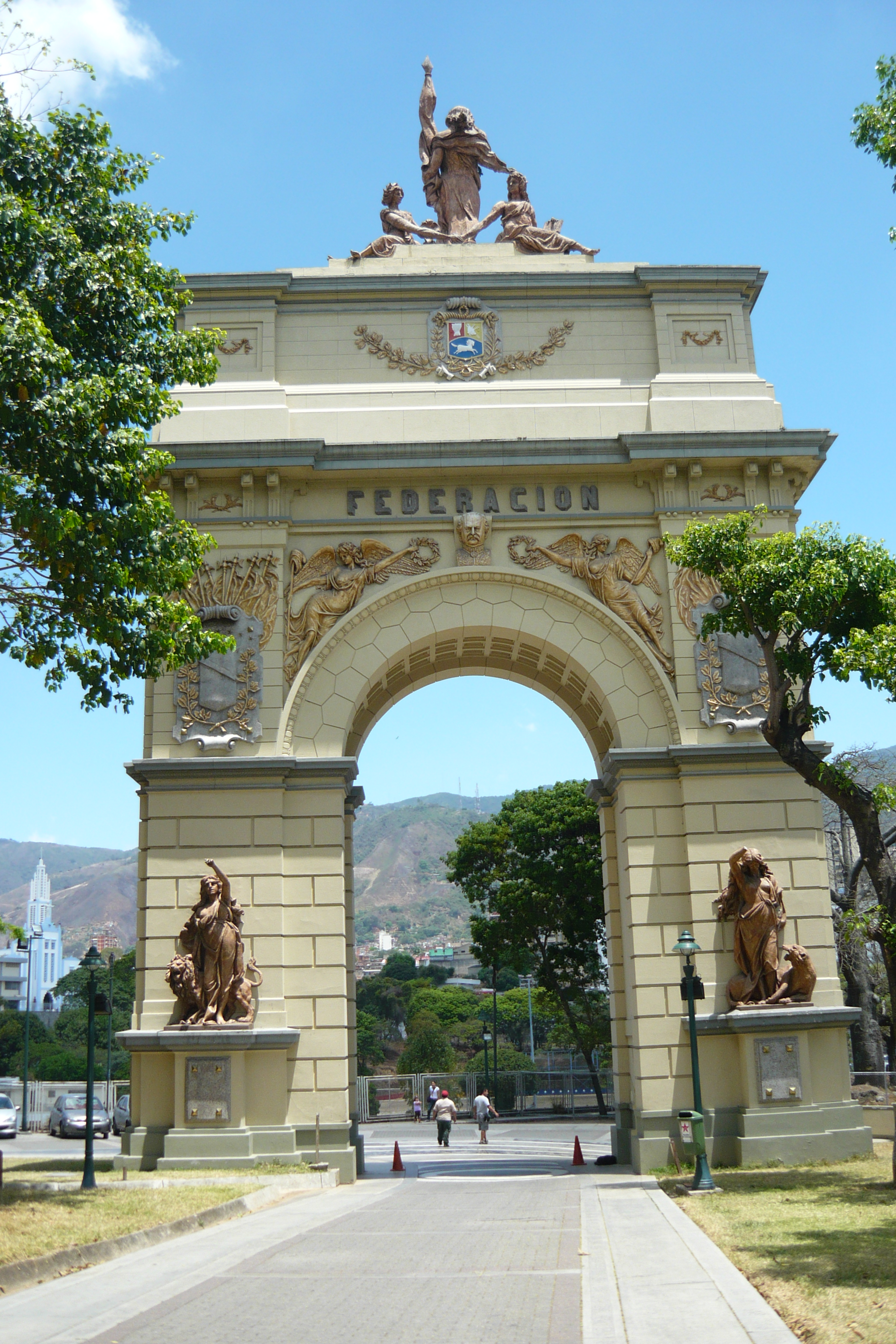
Arch of the Federation in Caracas. This monument commemorates the victory of the Liberals in the Federal War.

After independence and the subsequent dissolution of Gran Colombia in Venezuela, there was no strong government with sufficient authority and power to guarantee order, nor an idea of a nation, or civic experience. This led to a phenomenon of caudillismo and militarism in which local political-military chiefs were able to confront and defeat the central government together with popular masses that supported them, following their particular ideological interests. Similar processes occurred throughout Hispanic America after the end of Spanish colonial rule. This was due in part to the weakening of the ruling class, the Mantuans who had already ruled the country since colonial times. During the first half of the century, the only character who managed to become a factor of relative stability was José Antonio Páez, a military leader with great power whose political career would only end with his defeat on the battlefields. The popular caudillo of the llanos rose several times against governments that he considered had violated existing law or fought against those who tried to overthrow legitimate governments. His only rebellion against legality was La Cosiata, a patriotic reaction against a supranational project that most Venezuelans were not interested in embarking on.

Between 1830 and 1903 Venezuela lived through 50 years of war, with a total of 166 armed revolts. It is estimated that there were a million war casualties, with 70% of them being non-combatants killed by the plagues, famines, anarchy and political repression that wars brought. Other sources lower the figure to 260,000 killed in combat, plus 62,000 due to earthquakes and pestilence, not counting those killed in the Federal War. There were only two periods in that century that the governments were stable and lasting: from 1835 to 1848 and from 1870 to 1887.

The period of instability ended with the dictatorship of Juan Vicente Gómez who ruled Venezuela from 1908 until his death in 1935, thus ensuring a strong base for state power. Gómez extinguished the regional caudillos by passing power to the central high command of the Armed Forces of Venezuela. Due to these wars, the country became impoverished and suffered demographic stagnation.

These civil wars were above all combats between armed militias, each one organized by its place of origin, reflecting the alliances of the regional power groups with the government or the rebels at each moment. There were cases in which the inhabitants of neighboring towns or even of the same town clashed on a small scale during these civil wars. Each party sought the support of the regional caudillos, who held the real power at the time.

The economic disorganization of independence was deepened by civil wars, and long anarchy. Páez and Soublette based their economy on cocoa, typical of their region, the plains. In those years the Orientals, the Llanos and the Corianos disputed the hegemony in rapid succession. Guzmán Blanco, a man from Caracas, managed to stay in power thanks to the coffee boom, as did the Andeans Cipriano Castro and Juan Vicente Gómez.

Various guerrilla expeditions successively seized Caracas during that century, marking constant changes in the government. This process, in which regional leaders felt dissatisfied with the distribution of power in the capital, took up arms and overthrew weak central governments by taking Caracas, has been continuous since Independence. In 1812 the Corianos of Juan Domingo de Monteverde organized an expedition to overthrow the First Republic; a year later the Andeans of Bolívar and the Orientals or Guianans of Mariño put an end to the monarchical restoration; in 1814 José Tomás Boves and his llaneros destroyed the Second Republic. Páez was supported by the llaneros, Falcón by the Corianos, Castro or Gómez by the Andeans, Rolando Monteverde (liberal, collaborator of Andrade and later Castro, main caudillo of Guayana between 1899 and 1908) by the Orientals.
This continuous process is finalized by Cipriano Castro. After his victory in 1899, a modern professional national army was created that was capable of subduing the militias of Llaneros, Barloventoños, Corianos and Orientales that would confront him in the Liberating Revolution (1901–1903). Caudillismo had already been temporarily placated by Guzmancismo in the 1870's, however, after Guzmáns death, it had resurfaced again, which led to definitive measures being taken during the Castro government in the 1900's. Before, the Caudillos agreed with, or fought against each government, promoted local revolts or autonomist movements and got involved on different sides (according to their momentary interest) in the national rebellions. Having loyal armies guaranteed their regional pre-eminence. Many of them called themselves defenders of federalism, understood as "maintenance of federal autonomy" and opposition to any centralization of power.

=== Flags of the warring parties ===
Initially the conservatives and liberals, who marked the entire nineteenth century with their wars for power in the Andes, sought to identify themselves with the colors of the Venezuelan flag – yellow, blue and red from top to bottom. The former, supporters of Páez, used red to differentiate themselves from the latter, supported by Caracas intellectuals, veterans frustrated at not having received land, and llaneros, who wore yellow. However, in 1867 an alliance was formed between conservative and liberal sectors to support the revolution of José Tadeo Monagas, who had used power for personal benefit along with his brother, José Gregorio, during the previous years in which they ruled. To embody this new union, yellow and red chose the central color of the flag: blue. From the second half of the 19th century, conservatives identified themselves with the color blue, and the liberals, beginning with the supporters of the government of Juan Crisóstomo Falcón, continued to use yellow. Another point of difference was that the Liberals supported a federal system, while the Conservatives supported a centralized one. Although that was only theoretical, because many liberals in power exercised an authoritarian mandate, centered on their people, such as Antonio Guzmán Blanco, founder of Yellow Liberalism, who was also an anticlerical, supporter of economic liberalism and benefactor of the powerful who supported him to the power. In the last decades of the century, the conservatives were gradually left out of the game for power, now dominated by the liberals. From then on, civil wars were fought between factions of liberals, for example, some faithful to federalism and others in favor of centralism. In the country's last civil wars (1899 and 1901–1903) everyone called themselves Liberals: the caudillo José Manuel Hernández defined his party as "Nationalist Liberal"; also the dictator Castro, who defeated the "yellow liberals and the red and blue, or white, or tricolor liberals."

Guzmán Blanco was the dominant figure of the last decades of the nineteenth century, the subsequent weakening of his figure would be followed during the 90s of the century by a resurgence of anarchy and caudillismo. Both factors were also present in the Federal War (1859–1863) and even earlier, in the Second Republic (1813–1814), when the inability of the ruling classes to fulfill their promises and the aspirations of the common people led to extremely violent popular insurrections that devastated Venezuela. The oldest was under the command of Boves and the later directed by Zamora, two caudillos who died on the way to gain power. Instead, from the fragmentation of Gran Colombia to the Federal War, the dominant figure in Venezuela was Páez, a key figure in trying to impose a stable regime in the country.

== Civil wars and caudillos ==
The main ones are highlighted in bold.

=== Revolution of the Reforms (1835–1836) ===
The federal caudillos led by Santiago Mariño rose up against the conservative government of José María Vargas with the support of José Antonio Páez in June 1835. Mariño and his followers were defeated in March 1836. The conservatives maintain power for more than a decade. New liberal rebellions, on a smaller scale, would break out in June and September 1844.

=== Peasant insurrection of 1846 ===
Occurred in September 1846, animated and directed by the liberal Ezequiel Zamora against the conservative president Carlos Soublette. Páez became the main supporter of the government and managed to pacify the country by May 1847. The power of the conservatives was weakened and an agreement had to be reached so that a liberal like José Tadeo Monagas assumed power, the beginning of the Monagato or Liberal Oligarchy (1847–1858).

=== Venezuelan civil war of 1848–1849 ===
The Páez rebellion broke out on 4 February 1848, when the caudillo raised his llaneros against the liberal government of Monagas. They are joined by Zamora and Soublette and formed an army of 3,000 men. Monagas sends 6,000 soldiers to confront them. Defeated in the battle of Los Araguatos (10 March), Páez fled to the Caribbean where he gathered a new army with 6,000 muskets, seized Maracaibo but was again defeated in Taratara (6 April), having to entrench themselves in Maracaibo. On 2 July 1849, Paez landed at La Vela de Coro and concentrated 2,000 rebels, but was defeated at the battle of Casupo on 12 August, surrounded by 4–5,000 government soldiers, and surrendered three days later. He was exiled until 1858.

=== Barquisimeto Rebellion (1853) ===
In August 1853 in Cumaná a thousand conservatives had risen up demanding the return of Páez, they were quickly crushed and the government decided to increase the army to 10,000 men. A new revolt in Barquisimeto broke out on 12 July 1854, under the command of Juan Bautista Rodríguez, with 3,000 men mutinying; he immediately divided them into three battalions for a combined offensive inland. Fifteen days later, Rodríguez and 1,700 soldiers were defeated near his city by 2,500 government troops. On the 28th, 1,000 rebels led by Antonio José Vásquez surrendered. The third battalion dissolved in Portuguesa into guerrilla bands. A new rebellion of 150 soldiers broke out on the 31st in the same city, but by mid-August they had surrendered.

=== March Revolution (1858) ===
The brothers José Tadeo and José Gregorio Monagas kept taking turns in power until 5 March 1858, when a revolt, led by the liberal Julián Castro Contreras (with the support of the conservatives, broke out in Valencia, soon having more than five thousand armed followers. On 18 March, Castro Contreras entered Caracas, three days after the resignation of the Monagas. The alliance between Liberals and Conservatives was short-lived, triggering a new and worse conflict the next year.

=== Federal War (1859–1863) ===
A massive insurrection broke out on 20 February 1859, under the command of the Liberal Ezequiel Zamora, forming an army of 3,000 rebels. The majority of war actions were guerrillas actions and only two major battles were fought. Zamora won the Battle of Santa Inés on 10 December 1859 (2,500 rebels defeated 3,200 government, suffering 200 and 800 casualties respectively). His army grew to 7,000 men with the help of Juan Antonio Sotillo, but he was assassinated on the following 10 January and was succeeded by Juan Crisóstomo Falcón, after which many rebels deserted. The liberal army included 3,000 veteran eastern llaneros. The liberals were decisively defeated in the Battle of Coplé (17 February 1860) by León de Febres Cordero. The remaining 5,000 liberal soldiers switched to guerrilla warfare that plunged the country into deep anarchy. This conflict was the bloodiest of all those experienced, between 20,000 and 100,000 people died. The Treaty of Coche on 23 May 1863, put an end to the war with the victory of Juan Crisóstomo Falcón. After the fall of Guanare (5 April 1863), the conservatives had no way to resist. The liberals controlled Coro, Maracaibo, Barquisimeto and Guayana, with two armies (4,000 men in the Venezuelan west and 3,000 in the southwest).

=== La Genuina (1867) ===
In September 1867 General Luciano Mendoza rose up in Bolívar against Falcón, dissatisfied with that government. In December, Generals Miguel Antonio Rojas and Pedro Arana did the same in Aragua and in Carabobo. Falcón sends Generals Pedro Manuel Rojas to the southeast and José Loreto Arismendi and José Eusebio Acosta to the east. Manuel Ezequiel Bruzual was in charge of the General Staff. The rebels under the command of General Natividad Mendoza were defeated on Cerro La Esperanza, in Petare, by the government generals Justo Valles and Vidal Rebolledo. From then, the rebels were forced to limit themselves to guerrilla actions. On 16 October, Blanco Guzmán negotiated a peace agreement with Mendoza. Two days later the pardon was delivered.

=== Blue Revolution (1868) ===
After years of political tension, on 12 December 1867 José Tadeo Monagas and disgruntled liberals and conservatives, called the Blue rebels, rose up against the Falcón government. They gathered 4,000 soldiers from Guárico, Carabobo and Aragua. These, under the command of Miguel Antonio Rojas, were defeated twelve days later near the capital. The Blue Revolution had begun with autonomous and uncoordinated uprisings. On 25 April 1868, Falcón had to resign, but this did not satisfy the Blue rebels. On 6 May they face each other in Las Adjuntas and four days later in Monte Caballería. The interim government of Manuel Ezequiel Bruzual tried to negotiate, but Monagas concentrated 4,000 soldiers around the capital. Between 22 and 25 July, 3,300 Blues attacked Caracas, defended by 2,300 government soldiers. More than 1,000 combatants on both sides are killed. On 26 June 1868, Monagas entered Caracas, and appointed Guillermo Tell Villegas as interim president. Bruzual fled to La Guaira and then to Puerto Cabello, Monagas with 3,000 men besieged him for ten days until the capitulation on 14 August, Bruzual dying in the fighting. Monagas then sent Rojas to pacify the west.

=== April Revolution (1869) ===
The so called Yellow Revolution happened on 14 August 1869, when the Yellow liberal Antonio Guzmán Blanco tried to seek support to confront the Monagas government and was attacked by the army. He had to take refuge among the foreign delegations and went into exile. The rebellion broke out after two years of political anarchy during the Monagas government. Monagas' Liberal-Conservative coalition became fractured as the Conservatives began to concentrate power. Guzmán Blanco disembarked in Curamichate, near La Vela de Coro, on 14 February 1870. He had assembled 52 ships in Curaçao, bringing material to quickly arm an army of some 18,000 rebels. On 27 April, after three days of fighting, Guzmán Blanco and six to eight thousand rebels entered Caracas (the city had only 1,600–2,000 defenders, most of them armed civilians). Guzmán Blancothen marched with 6,000 soldiers on Apure, pacifying it at the beginning of 1871 and consolidating his power. The long period of Yellow Liberalism began.

=== Coro Revolution (1874) ===
The Revolution of Coro or Colinada began in October 1874. The rebels were commanded by General León Colina but by the following February they were defeated. They had been supported by General José Ignacio Pulido Briceño in the East. With this victory, the power of President Antonio Guzmán Blanco was more established, until 1877 when he had to leave power in favor of his opponents.

=== Revindicating Revolution (1878) ===
Francisco Linares Alcántara led a government very opposed to his predecessors Guzmancism, but he was assassinated on 30 November 1878. On 3 January 1879 Guzmán Blanco rose up against his successor José Gregorio Valera. Quickly the bulk of the Venezuelan army deserted, and more than 10,000 soldiers joined the former dictator while only 3,000 remained loyal to president Valera. Guzmán Blanco divided his army into three forces and sent General José Gregorio Cedeño with 2,300 soldiers to La Victoria, where the decisive battle took place on 6 February. More than 2,000 combatants died and barely 300 men loyal to Valera remained capable of fighting. On 13 February, Cedeño entered Caracas and Guzmán Blanco again became President until 1884.

=== Legalist Revolution (1892) ===
Guzmán Blanco was succeeded by his lieutenants in the continuing governments. On 11 March 1892 the liberal Joaquín Crespo rebelled with his llaneros in Guárico. The government of Raimundo Andueza Palacio sends General Sebastián Casañas with 4,000 men to suffocate the movement, focusing the fight on Táchira, where Governor Cipriano Castro joined the rebels. After some initial victories, the government forces began to fall back in the west until the decisive defeat at Táriba (14–15 May), allowing the rebels Castro and Juan Vicente Gómez to enter Mérida at the head of 3,000 soldiers. After this success, Crespo went from mobilizing small bands of fighters to important contingents throughout the country. On 17 June, Andueza Palacio resigned from the presidency and Tell Villegas remained as interim. On 1 July, in La Cortada del Guayabo, two armies of 5,000 combatants each, face each other. 9,000 rebels assaulted Villa de Cura on 9 August. After a new defeat in Los Colorados, on 4 October, the government abandoned the capital. Crespo approached with 10,000 soldiers and on 6 October entered Caracas victoriously.

=== Queipa Revolution (1898) ===
In 1897 Crespo organized an electoral fraud to ensure the victory of his supporter, Ignacio Andrade. The defeated candidate and leader José Manuel Hernández rose up on 17 March 1898. The rebels of Hernández and Luis Lima Loreto added up to 700 combatants, but they succeeded in defeating former president Crespo and his 1,500 men in Mata Carmelara, in Cojedes, on 16 April. Crespo died in combat. The rebel army quickly grew to 16,000 fighters, while the government had 20,000, including loyalist warlord militias. The Minister of War, Antonio Fernández, was also defeated on 5 June. Finally, President Andrade entrusted Ramón Guerra with the campaign. He forced Hernández and the rebels to capitulate on 12 June in El Hacha, in Yaracuy.

=== Restorative Liberal Revolution (1899) ===
Venezuelans exiled in Colombia under the command of Cipriano Castro returned to their country in an expedition on 23 May 1899. Like the famous Admirable Campaign in 1813, the forces of the rebels called Restorers or Tachirenses grew, as they entered the center Venezuelan Andean to overthrow the unpopular Andrade government. Initially Castro and his 57 companions, soon numbering 700, defeated 5,000 government troops at Paso Yegüines and entered Mérida. On 12 September, with 2,000 troops, he defeated 4,000 or 4,600 government soldiers in Tocuyito commanded by the Minister of War, General Diego Bautista Ferrer, who lost 2,000 men trying to assault the enemy positions. Two days later President Andrade assumed personal command of the war, but Castro launched a coordinated offensive against Caracas. After this, several warlords and their militias deserted to the rebel side: Leopoldo Baptista with 3,000 followers and Luciano Mendoza with 4,500. On 20 October, Andrade was overthrown in a coup and forced into exile in Curaçao. With 10,000 soldiers, Castro entered the capital on 23 October with the generals and caudillos Luciano Mendoza (Yellow liberal), Samuel Acosta and Luis Lima Loreto (liberal nationalists or "Mochistas", meaning faithful to Caudillo José Manuel "Mocho" Hernández).

=== Liberating Revolution (1901) ===
At first, on 26 July 1901, a group of 1,000 Venezuelan exiles in Colombia and 5,000 Colombian soldiers led by Carlos Rangel Garbiras attempted to invade Venezuela. However, they were unsuccessful and faced defeat in San Cristóbal. In response to Castro's efforts to consolidate political and military authority, several regional leaders, known as caudillos, began to rebel. Initially, these rebellions occurred in isolated areas, but eventually grew into a large-scale uprising led by Manuel Antonio Matos, a banker. Matos had spent months forming a coalition of opposition politicians and military personnel, and received support from foreign companies with vested interests in the country. The first to rebel was Governor Mendoza de Aragua on 19 December. Castro sent Gómez against Mendoza, facing each other in San Mateo and Villa de Cura on 21 and 22 December respectively. Mendoza was defeated and persecuted. On 7 February a new great rebellion took place. The Mochistas were in revolt in the center and west of the country, the Yellow Liberals in the east, and the Ciudad Bolívar garrison had risen up led by Nicolás Rolando. After the decisive battle of La Victoria (12 October 1902) the rebels begin to be subdued, the powerful army of 12,000 to 16,000 combatants that they had concentrated, suffered 3,000 casualties. Castro barely had 6,000 soldiers.

This was the last civil war in the country, that ended on 21 July 1903, after three days of siege, when Rolando's troops surrendered in Ciudad Bolívar. Cipriano Castro seized absolute power until he was overthrown by Juan Vicente Gómez in 1908.

== See also ==
- Venezuelan coups d'état
- Caracazo
- History of Venezuela
- Politics of Venezuela
- Elections in Venezuela

== Bibliography ==
- Dixon, Jeffrey S. & Meredith Reid Sarkees (2015). A Guide to Intra-state Wars: An Examination of Civil, Regional, and Intercommunal Wars, 1816–2014. CQ Press. ISBN 978-1-5063-1798-4.
- Esteves González, Edgar (2006). Las Guerras de Los Caudillos. Caracas: El Nacional. ISBN 980-388-247-3.
- Guarda Rolando, Inés (2005). "La acción política de los caudillos venezolanos de finales del siglo XIX: un ejército prágmatico". En Domingo Irwin G. & Frédérique Langue, coordinación. Militares y poder en Venezuela: ensayos históricos vinculados con las relaciones civiles y militares venezolanas. Caracas: Universidad Católica Andrés Bello. ISBN 978-980-244-399-4.
- Quintero Montiel, Inés Mercedes (1989). El ocaso de una estirpe: la centralización restauradora y el fin de los caudillos históricos. Caracas: Editorial Alfadil. ISBN 978-980-6005-70-9.
