= List of wars involving Venezuela =

This list includes all major armed conflicts involving the Bolivarian Republic of Venezuela and its predecessor states from the 18th century to the present.

== Table ==
War of Jenkins' Ear (War of the Austrian Succession):

- Battle of La Guaira – 1743
- Battle of Puerto Cabello – 1743

Anglo-Spanish War:

- Cutting out of the Hermione – 1799
- Invasion of Venezuela – 1806
- Battle of La Vela de Coro – 1806

War of 1812 (Sixty Years' War):

- Battle of La Guaira – 1812

| Conflict | Allies | Opponents | Results | Major battles |
|---|---|---|---|---|
| Venezuelan War of Independence (1810–1823) Detail of The Battle of Carabobo (1887) by Martín Tovar y Tovar | Patriots 1810: Caracas Junta; 1811–1816: Venezuela; Colombia 1816–1819: Venezuela; Haiti 1819–1823: Gran Colombia | (Spanish Empire) Royalists Spain: (Spain) Supreme Junta; (Spain) Governorate of Venezuela; (Spain) Governorate of Colombia | Patriot victory: Independence of Gran Colombia; Dismemberment of the Spanish Empire | Battle of La Victoria – 1812; Battle of Alto de los Godos – 1813; Battle of Niquitao – 1813 – Admirable Campaign; Battle of Los Horcones – 1813 – Admirable Campaign; Battle of Taguanes – 1813 – Admirable Campaign; Battle of Araure – 1813; Battle of La Victoria – 1814; Battle of San Mateo – 1814; Battle of Carabobo – 1814; Battle of Urica – 1814; Battle of San Félix – 1817; Battle of Matasiete – 1817; Battle of Las Queseras del Medio – 1819; Battle of Carabobo – 1821; Battle of Lake Maracaibo – 1823 |
| Spanish Reconquest of New Granada (1815–1816) | United Provinces of New Granada | Kingdom of Spain | Spanish victory: Reestablishment of the Viceroyalty of New Granada | |
| Liberation Campaign of New Granada (1819–1820) | Venezuela New Granada: British Legions | Spain | Victory: Liberation of New Granada by Independentists | |
| Ecuadorian War of Independence (1820–1822) | Patriots: Guayaquil; Gran Colombia; Chile; Peru; United Provinces | Royalists: (Spain) Spanish Empire: Viceroyalty of Peru; Real Audiencia of Quito | Patriot victory: Annexation of the territory to Gran Colombia | |
| Gran Colombia–Peru War (1828–1829) | Gran Colombia | Peru | Stalemate: Larrea-Gual Treaty; * Peruvian invasion lost momentum after the Battle of Tarqui; Peru maintained supremacy at sea after the fall of Guayaquil.; Coup d'état against President La Mar; Colombian troops driven out of Bolivia; Peruvian recognition of the Colombian annexation of Guayaquil; Implicit Colombian recognition of Peruvian sovereignty over Tumbes, Jaen, and Maynas; Status quo ante bellum | |
| Federal War (1859–1863) Combat of Maiquetía, during the beginning of the Federal War, 2 September 1859 | (Venezuela) Conservative Government | (Venezuela) Federalists | Federalist victory: Treaty of Coche; Establishment of a Federalist government | Battle of Santa Inés – 1859; Battle of Coplé – 1860; Battle of Buchivacoa – 1862 |
| Venezuelan crisis of 1902–1903 (1902–1903) A cover of the "Le Petit Parisien" depicting the bombardment of Castle San Carlos | Venezuela; Supported by: United States; Argentina | United Kingdom; France; Germany; Italy; Supported by: Spain; Mexico; Belgium; Netherlands; Denmark | Compromise: Venezuelan debt dispute resolved; European fleet withdraws | |
| Dutch–Venezuelan crisis of 1908 (1908) HNLMS Gelderland, the Dutch cruiser that successfully captured two Venezuelan gunboats in Venezuelan territorial waters | Venezuela | Netherlands | Dutch victory: HNLMS Gelderland captures Venezuelan gunboats Alexis and 23 de Mayo; Dutch blockade of Venezuela's coast | |
| World War II (unofficial: 1942–1945; officially in 1945) (Note: Venezuelan waters were one of the scenarios of the Battle of the Caribbean. Venezuela formally declared war on the Axis powers in February 1945.) Venezuelan gunboat General Urdaneta, which assisted in rescuing the crews of several torpedoed vessels during Operation Neuland | Allies; United States; Soviet Union; United Kingdom; China; France; Poland; Canada; Australia; New Zealand; India; South Africa; Yugoslavia; Greece; Denmark; Norway; Netherlands; Belgium; Luxembourg; Czechoslovakia; Brazil; Mexico; Chile; Bolivia; Colombia; Ecuador; Paraguay; Peru; Venezuela; Uruguay; Argentina | Axis; Germany; Japan; Italy; Hungary; Romania; Bulgaria; Croatia; Slovakia; Finland; Thailand; Manchukuo; Mengjiang | Allied victory: Fall of Nazi Germany, the Empire of Japan, and Fascist Italy; Creation of the United Nations; Emergence of the United States and Soviet Union as superpowers; Beginning of the Cold War | |
| Invasion of Machurucuto (1967) | Venezuelan National Guard; Venezuelan Army | Revolutionary Left Movement; Cuban guerrillas Supported by: Cuba | Venezuelan government victory: Cuban expedition fails. | |
| Pemon conflict (2016–present) | Venezuela: (Venezuela) National Bolivarian Armed Forces; (Venezuela); Colectivos; ELN; Tupamaro | (Venezuela) Pemon territorial guard (Venezuela) Rebels of the 513 Infantry Battalion (Venezuela) Armed Pemon and civil rebels (Venezuela) Pemon and civil demonstrators | Ongoing | |
| Operation Southern Spear (2025–present) | Venezuela; Cartel of the Suns (alleged by the United States) (Note: While the involvement of various Venezuelan government and military officials with drug cartels has been documented, independent experts dispute the existence of an organized cartel run by these officials.); Cuba; Supported by: Russia | United States; Supported by: Dominican Republic; Trinidad and Tobago; El Salvador; Argentina; United Kingdom | Ongoing: US military buildup in the Caribbean; Capture of Nicolás Maduro | Various US strikes on vessels (list) – 2025; Various US seizures of oil tankers (list) – 2025–2026; US strike on port in Venezuela – 2025; United States intervention in Venezuela – 2026 |

== See also ==
- Venezuela during World War I
