= 1846 Venezuelan peasant insurrection =

Peasant revolt in Venezuela

Peasant insurrection of 1846
- Part of the Venezuelan civil wars
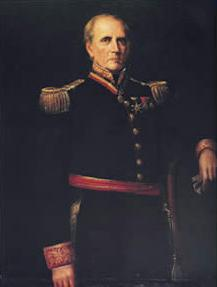
- Carlos Soublette, president at the beginning of the war
Date	1 September 1846 - 25 May 1847
Location	Provinces of Caracas, Barcelona and Carabobo. Current states of Aragua, Carabobo, Guárico and Anzoátegui State
Result	Conservative victory

Belligerents
Conservative government	Federal rebels

Commanders and leaders
Carlos Soublette; José Antonio Páez; José Tadeo Monagas; Francisco de Paula Alcántara	Ezequiel Zamora; Francisco José Rangel

Strength
1,155 troops (492 line and 663 militiamen) and 2 schooners (Constitución and July 28) in September 1846; 4,096 troops, 3 schooners and 3 archers in December 1846; 5,208 troops in the West, 3,302 in the East, and 2,575 in the center in 1847	-

The Venezuelan peasant insurrection of 1846 was a popular and social rebellion that broke out in various agricultural areas of Venezuela in September 1846 and lasted until May 1847. The rebellion was suppressed by the Conservative army.

The rebellion took place in the aftermath of the fraudulent 1846 Venezuelan presidential election.

== Background ==
There were three direct causes of the rebellion. First, a devastating crisis from which the nation had been suffering since 1842. Second, rural discontent with the fiscal measures implemented by the government of Carlos Soublette in 1843. Third, incitement by the liberal faction led by Antonio Leocadio Guzmán, who engaged in vigorous and harsh propaganda campaigns against the Conservative government. All three culminated into insurrection.

Three violent uprisings took place, starting with one in Villa de Cura under the command of Juan Silva in June 1844, then another in September in Altagracia de Orituco under the command of Juan Celestino Centeno. Finally, an assault on the Calabozo prison in December 1845 orchestrated by Juan and José Gabriel Rodríguez. All three were quickly and promptly suppressed by the government. But the government did little to end the social discontent simmering within the country.

By mid-1846, the economic and social crisis had worsened, leading to political chaos during the presidential campaigns in August of that year. The main candidates were José Tadeo Monagas, supported by the conservative government, and Antonio Leocadio Guzmán, founder of the Liberal Party. Incumbent Conservative President Soublette increased the number of army recruits, a decision which was denounced by his opponents as a way to intimidate voters. The elections were finally held in relative order; however, the chaos caused by the previous insurrections meant the results - showing Monagas's victory - were not accepted.

Seeking to calm the situation, Santiago Mariño planned a meeting in Maracay, intending to meet with General José Antonio Páez, the most powerful man within the conservative regime, as well as with the defeated candidate Antonio Leocadio Guzmán, who was then residing in Caracas, to reach an agreement with the opposition. Guzmán however left for the valleys of Aragua with a large number of his supporters who were then joined by new forces along the way. The government was alarmed by this and put the army on high alert on 1 September. The meeting was abandoned.

== War ==
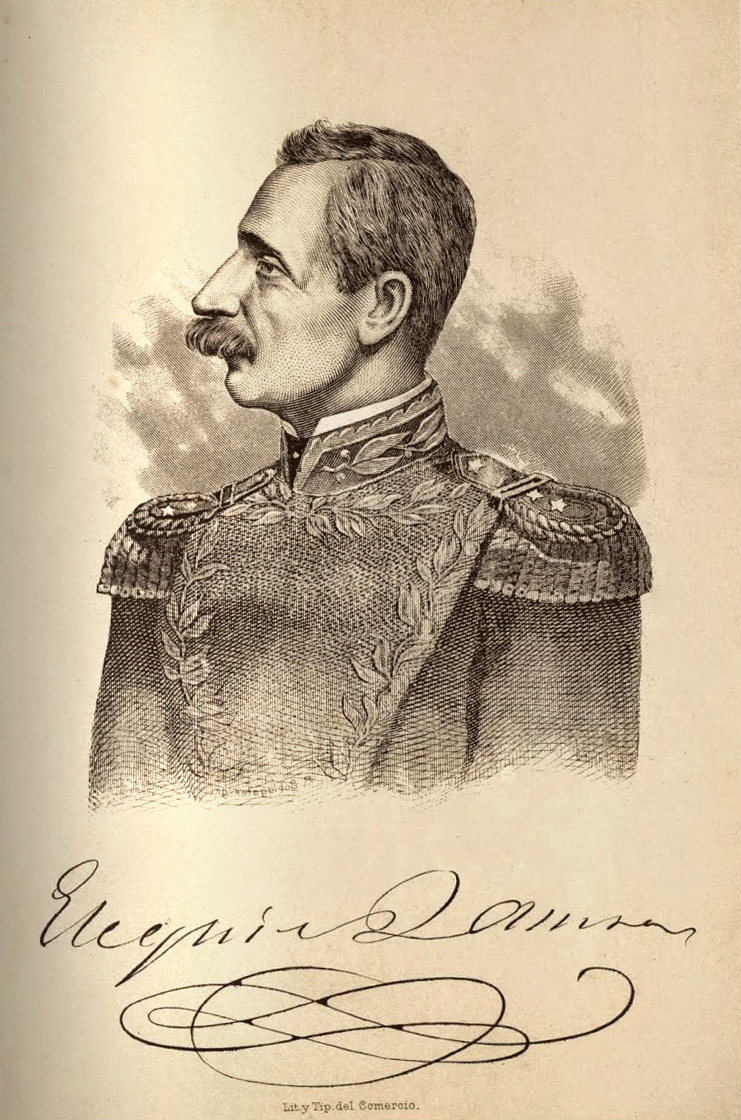
Ezequiel Zamora

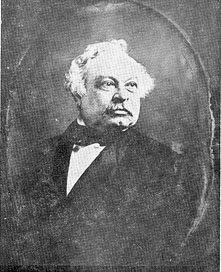
José Antonio Páez, highest representative of the conservative oligarchy.

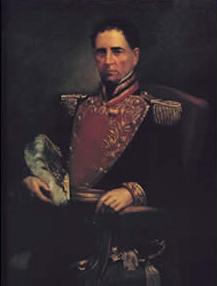
José Tadeo Monagas was the candidate of harmony between conservatives and liberals.

On 2 September, Guzmán was in La Victoria when Francisco José Rangel rose up in rebellion and began an uprising at dawn near the town of Magdaleno, Rangel's land was confiscated by the government and they prevented him from voting. Rallying behind Guzmán, he led an attack on the hacienda of Yuma near Güigüe, property of lawyer and Paecista politician Ángel Quintero, killing his butler, wounding some of its inhabitants, and freeing its slaves. The government arrested Guzman, while Rangel escaped. Rebel ranks swelled with the peasants and escaped slaves, and they were eventually joined by Ezequiel Zamora. Zamora was with Guzmán in La Victoria and became one of his main leaders in Villa de Cura.

Seeing that the peasants' rebellion was spiraling out of control, President Soublette began to take steps to quell it. He requested a loan of 300,000 pesos in order to put down the insurrection. He appointed Páez as first commander of the army and sent him with 6,000 men to regain control of the central-western region. He appointed José Tadeo Monagas as second commander, in charge of retaking the Barlovento and eastern region with 3,000 soldiers. Zamora and his army were defeated and captured at the Battle of the Laguna de Piedra on 26 March 1847. Zamora was sentenced to death on 27 July of the same year, but José Tadeo Monagas reduced the sentence to 10 years in prison. Zamora escaped from prison, and was later pardoned.

== Consequences ==
Guerrillas remained scattered throughout the Venezuelan territory and the chaos led to a sharp increase in common crime, with bands of outlaws attacking everyone without political background. This forced the government to maintain an army of 813 line veterans, 972 militiamen and 212 municipal policemen as late as January 1848, when an amnesty had been given between June and August.
The rebellion forced the conservatives to make an agreement with the liberals that brought Monagas to power, thus ending their hegemony, called the Conservative Oligarchy, and beginning a new period called Monagato that lasted until 1858 and the March Revolution.

== See also ==
- History of Venezuela
- Venezuelan civil wars
- Federal War
