= Juan Antonio Sotillo =

Venezuelan military leader

Juan Antonio Sotillo

General Juan Antonio Sotillo (1790–1878) was a nineteenth-century military leader from Venezuela. During his long life, uncommon for a military leader at the time, he served under the army of Venezuelan general Simón Bolívar, as well as in most of Venezuela's 19th century civil wars and military revolts.

== Early life ==
Juan Antonio Sotillo was born in Santa Ana of Anzoátegui, Venezuela, in 1790. Born to a family of humble means, the young Juan Antonio Sotillo started his military career in 1815 as a soldier in the Santa Ana cavalry squadron, under the orders of general José Tadeo Monagas. On 27 September 1816, he participated, still under general Monagas' orders, in the battle of El Juncal, against the Spanish royalist general Francisco Tomás Morales.

In 1824, Sotillo reached the rank of general, after fighting in several important campaigns during Venezuela's emancipation war. Later, after the withdrawal of Spanish royalists from Venezuelan territory, he became an important military leader in the recently created Republic of Colombia.

== Republican life ==
After the failure of Gran Colombia, Venezuela became an independent Republic in 1830. In 1833, Sotillo became Commander of the Province of Barcelona, in eastern Venezuela. Then, in mid-1849, he accompanied general José Laurencio Silva in the Campaign of Guárico, against a revolt headed by general José Antonio Páez who exilated in Curazao invades Venezuela from La Vela de Coro on July 2, 1849 with the aim of overhthron the President Jose Tadeo Monagas government. After landed the revolutionaries penetrates as far as Cojedes plains with the support of León de Febres Cordero and his son Ramón Páez. Santiago Mariño and José Gregorio Monagas surround Páez's forces. Juan Antonio Sotillo defeats Lorenzo Belisario and Nicasio Belisario at the Manapire Pass on July 17, has their bodies decapitated, and sends the heads to President Monagas. Sotillo also defeated Felipe Macero and José Antonio Páez's rearguard was attacked at the Battle of Casupo, forcing him to capitulate in Macapo to General José Laurencio Silva. In violation of the capitulation, Páez and his men were arrested by Joaquín Herrera.

With the capture of the main leader of the conservative rebellion, the movement lost strength and ended almost entirely with the capture of Maracaibo by liberal troops. The defeated had unsuccessfully requested foreign intervention. With the defeat of the conservative reaction, the First Liberal Autocracy was consolidated, which would last until the March Revolution.

Always close to the Monagas family clan, Sotillo was named second head of the army during the presidency of José Gregorio Monagas, brother of his compadre and former commander general José Tadeo Monagas. Later, in May 1853, he was called on to fight an attempt to overthrow the government of José Gregorio Monagas. Despite his efforts, the Monagas government fell in 1858 and he was forced into exile afterwards. From the island of Trinidad, he attempted to organize, without success, an expedition against Venezuela. In 1859, he joined the Federal cause, taking up arms along with his two children, Miguel Sotillo and José Antonio Sotillo, with whom he commanded the campaigns of El Banco de Los Pozos (18 March 1859) and Las Piedras (16 April 1859), where they were defeated by the troops of general José Maria Zamora.

== Federal war ==
In July 1859, Sotillo started guerrilla warfare in the mountains of El Tigre. At this point, his prestige was worth his appointment as Second Commander of the Venezuelan Federal War. On 18 November 1859, he fought in El Pao of Barcelona, marching afterwards towards El Baúl along with Julio César Monagas, in January 1860. In El Baúl, generals Sotillo and Julio César Monagas met with general Juan Crisóstomo Falcón and the Federal armies of the West. On 17 February 1860, he participated in the Battle of Coplé, taking control simultaneously of the Eastern column, when general Falcón dissolved a division of the Federal Army as a consequence of the defeat suffered in that battle against general León de Febres Cordero. Earlier that month, on 2 February 1860, general Sotillo's son, José Antonio Sotillo, died under enemy fire from centralist colonel José López Mercado at El Lecherito. As a consequence of this, his other son, Miguel Sotillo, decided to execute all their prisoners in retaliation. However, Sotillo prevented his son from carrying out this scheme, an outstanding gesture that has always been recognized by Venezuelan historians. Later, when arriving in eastern Venezuela, he established a guerrilla operation, from March to May 1860. Unfortunately, he was defeated on three occasions, the first in El Lecherito in July 1860; a second one in Aragua, on 16 August; and the last one in Santa Ana, on 21 August 1860.

After these defeats, on 29 March 1860, Sotillo reunited his forces with those of general Julio César Monagas, son of his friend general José Gregorio Monagas. Months thereafter, Sotillo and Monagas fought together in the territory of La Mesa de Guanipa in April 1861. That same year, in October, he signed a short truce, well known under the name of the Treaty of Santa Ana, with general José Maria Zamora's forces. However, Sotillo took up arms to fight in the battle of Las Chaguaramas, on 3 April 1862, where he was once more defeated and his son Miguel was mortally wounded. Julio César Monagas also died in May that same year as a consequence of his injuries from the Battle of Cureña (11 April 1861).

In March 1863 he continued his guerrilla activities towards the Eastern part of the province of Guárico and, in August, towards Guayana. After the military triumph of the Federación on 8 April 1862, Sotillo retired to Barcelona where he received a modest allowance for his military services.

== Last years ==
On 4 March 1868, general Sotillo took up arms for the last time against the government of general Juan Crisóstomo Falcón, during the Blue Revolution. Again, he was called on by his former commander and compadre general José Tadeo Monagas. In December 1868, José Tadeo Monagas died and Sotillo was named head of the Armies of The Blue Government. In January 1869, he decided to support the presidential candidacy of José Ruperto Monagas, son of his compadre the late general Jose Tadeo Monagas. Being then an octogenarian, general Sotillo retired from public life after the arrival of general Antonio Guzmán Blanco to power in April 1870.

General Sotillo died in his hometown of Santa Ana in 1874 and his remains were put to rest in the National Pantheon of Venezuela on 9 January 1878. While alive, he was nicknamed the Centaur of Santa Ana, after his temper and disposition in battle. Juan Antonio Sotillo Municipality is named for him.

== See also ==
- Antonio Guzmán Blanco
- Federal War
- José Antonio Páez
- List of presidents of Venezuela
