= Leocadio =

Leocadio is a surname. Notable people with the surname include:

- Paolo da San Leocadio (1447–1520), Italian painter
- Antonio Leocadio Guzmán (1801–1884), Venezuelan politician, journalist, military leader and father of Antonio Guzmán Blanco
- Pedro de Alcântara João Carlos Leopoldo Salvador Bibiano Francisco Xavier de Paula Leocádio Miguel Gabriel Rafael Gonzaga (1825–1891), full name of Pedro II of Brazil, Brazilian monarch
