= Invasion of Venezuela =

Several actual or proposed events have been described as an invasion of Venezuela:

- The Admirable Campaign by Simón Bolívar in 1813
- The 2026 United States intervention in Venezuela
- A proposed United States invasion of Venezuela

== See also ==
- List of wars involving Venezuela
