= Bernardo Tinedo Belasco =

Venezuelan politician

Bernardo Tinedo Belasco (died 25 August 1907) was the president of the Venezuelan state of Zulia in 1880 and 1881, the combined state of Falcón Zulia in 1884, and the State of Falcón in 1886.

In 1878, Belasco helped establish a music school. He was also a general.

== See also ==
- List of presidents and governors of Zulia
