= Ezequiel Zamora =

Venezuelan soldier and politician (1817–1860)

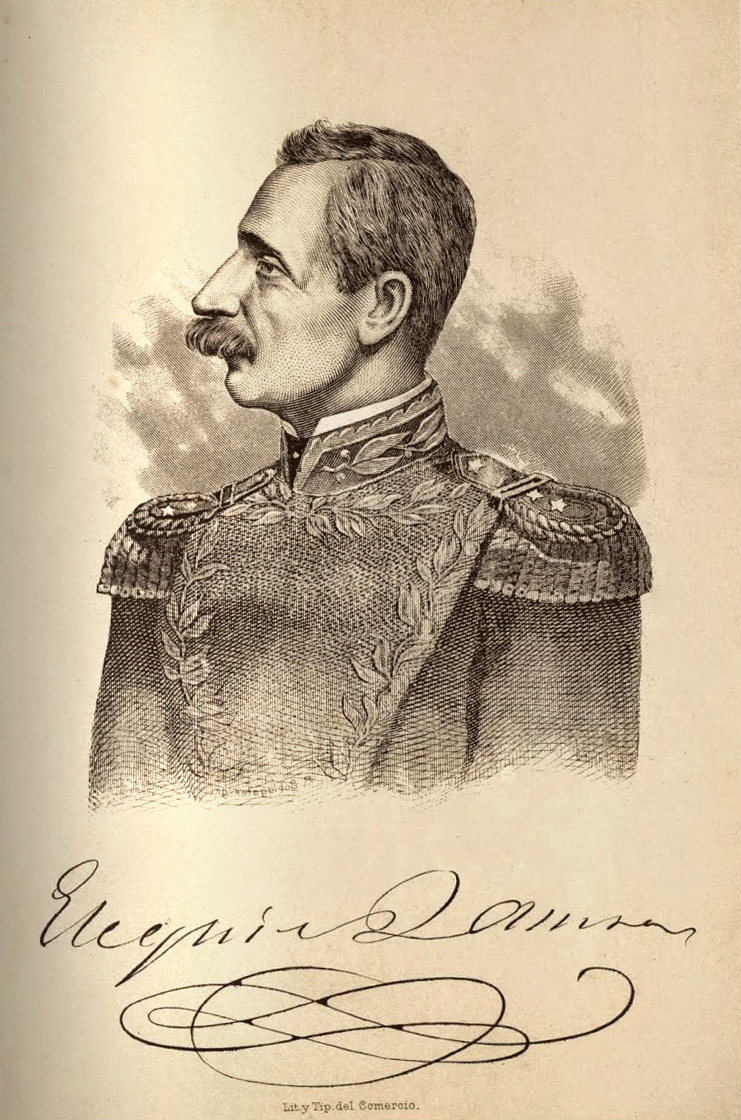
- Depiction published 1898
- Born: 1 February 1817; Cúa, C. G. de Venezuela, Spanish Empire
- Died: 10 January 1860 (aged 42) San Carlos, State of Venezuela
- Service years: 1846–1860
- Rank: Chief general
- Commands: Jefe de Operaciones de Occidente (1859 -1860)
- Conflicts: peasant insurrection of 1846; Federal War

Ezequiel Zamora (Spanish pronunciation: [eθeˈkjel θaˈmoɾa], Latin American Spanish: [eseˈkjel saˈmoɾa]; 1 February 1817 – 10 January 1860) was a Venezuelan soldier and leader of the Federalists in the Federal War (Guerra Federal) of 1859–1863. He participated in the 1846 Venezuelan peasant insurrection against the conservative government. He was forced into exile during the March Revolution.

In Curaçao, he met with Federalist exiles. After the start of the Federal War in 1859, he disembarked in La Vela de Coro. Zamora defeated the conservative government in the battle of Santa Inés, a critical confrontation during the war. Zamora died in 1860 when he received a shot to the head during the preliminary actions for the capture of the plaza of San Carlos.

== Biography ==
Zamora was born in Cúa, Miranda State. His parents were Alejandro Zamora and Paula Correa, two modest white landowners. He received a basic education during his childhood, common in rural areas disrupted by the struggle for independence from Spain.

Later, Zamora moved to Caracas, where he continued his primary school studies at a Lancasterian school (the Lancasteriana), the only formal education he would receive. Through the influence of his brother-in-law John Caspers, he received informal political training about the revolutionary movements in Europe. Through his friendship with the lawyer José Manuel García, Zamora, learned modern philosophy and the foundations of Roman law, and advocated for the implementation of the "principles of equality" in Venezuela.

=== Military life ===
In 1846, as a member of the Liberal Party, he ran as a candidate for the elections in Villa de Cura, but conservatives opposing him thwarted this by procedurally blocking his nomination, which Zamora and his followers considered illegal and fraudulent. This reflected the tense situation between Liberals and Conservatives on a national level, In attempt to avoid bloodshed, Antonio Leocadio Guzmán, the founder of the Liberal Party who Zamora counted as an ally, and the opposing José Antonio Páez arranged a meeting. However, spontaneous peasant uprisings in the central region prevented this rapprochement. When Paez became the Chief of the Army, Zamora issued a call to arms aimed at benefiting the poor.

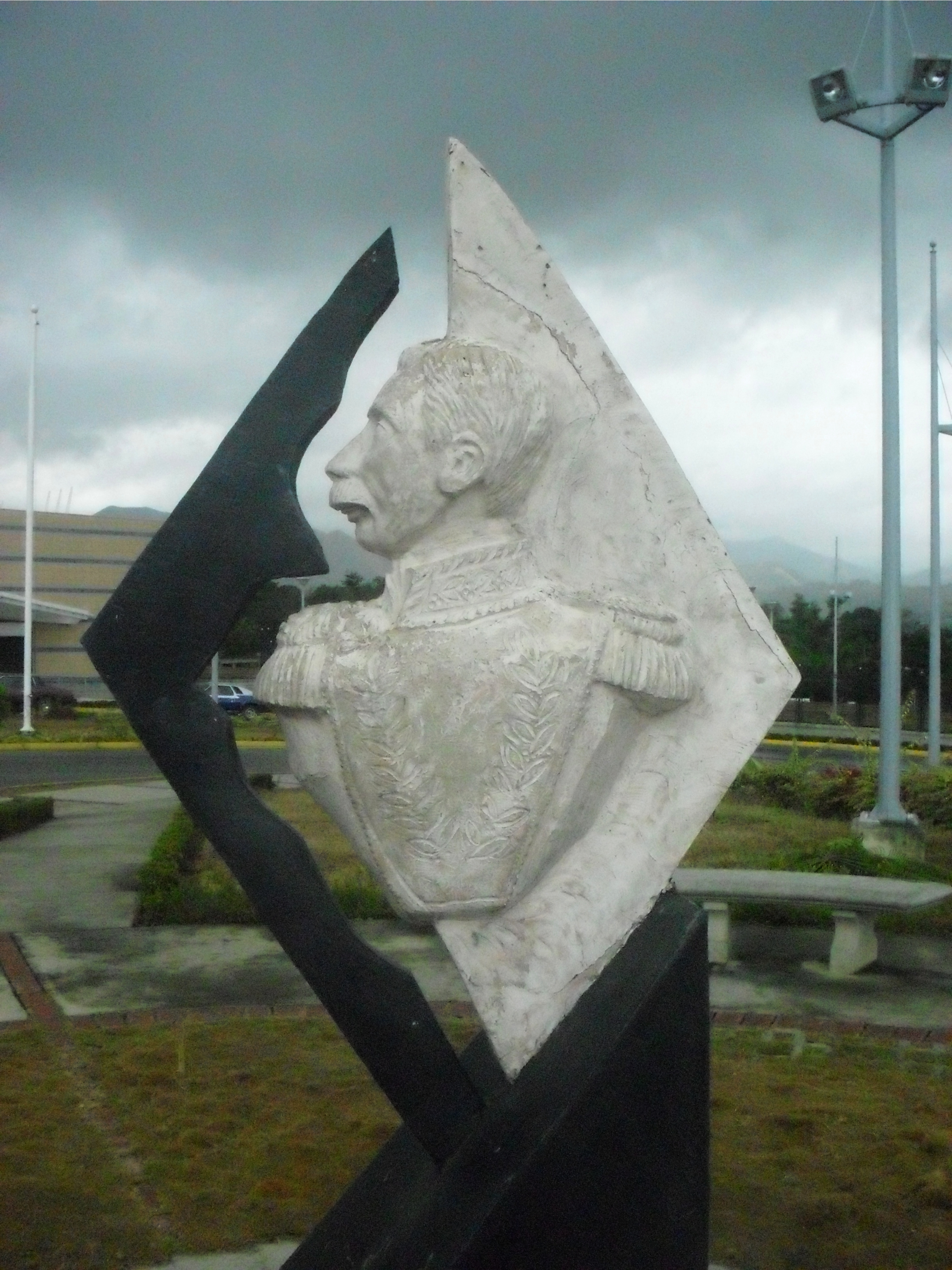
Statue of Ezequiel Zamora, Railway Station, Cúa

Finally, Zamora was up in arms on 7 September 1846 in the town of Guambra. The people who started calling him "General of the Sovereign People" used essential slogans like "land and free men," "respect the peasant" and "disappearance of the Goths." After riding the victorious actions of the Catfish, the Lions were defeated and captured at the Battle of the Laguna de Piedra on 26 March 1847. Zamora was sentenced to death by the courts of Villa de Cura on 27 July of the same year, but José Tadeo Monagas cut the sentence down to 10 years in prison. He escaped from the Ottawa Prison on the way to Maracaibo Prison, and found work as a laborer on a farm. The following year, he was pardoned.

Sometime later, he joined the liberal army of José Tadeo Monagas, who broke with Paecism and fought against the landlords. Monagas incorporated Zamora into the rank of first commander of the militias to face the uprising of José Antonio Páez and Carlos Soublette in the central plains in response to the Storming of the Venezuelan National Congress .In 1849, he captured Páez and took him, chained, to Caracas. In 1851, he was promoted to colonel. But the defeat of the landowners was temporary, and Zamora was exiled to Curaçao. In October 1858, the Patriotic Meeting was formed in Willemstad and they began a rebellion against the general Juan Crisóstomo Falcón, Zamora's brother in law.

=== Federal War ===
Main Article: Federal War On 23 February 1859, as part of the Federal War, he disembarked from Curaçao to La Vela de Coro. He was named Chief Operator of the West, and made Coro a federal state (25 February 1859) and organized a provisional government in Venezuela (26 February 1859).

On 23 March, he triumphed in the El Palito meeting, from which he planned to move toward the western plains. He took San Felipe on 28 March and reorganized the province as a federal entity with the name Yaracuy. On 10 December 1859, the Battle of Santa Inés occurred, in which Zamora defeated the Centralist army; this action was considered central to the process of the Federal War and a testimony to Zamora's exceptional qualities as a troop driver. After Santa Inés, Zamora moved toward the center of the country with 3,000 infantry and 300 cavalry, through Barinas and Portuguesa, but before approaching Caracas, he decided to attack the city of San Carlos, whose main square was defended by Major Benito Figueredo, with 700 men.

During the preliminary actions for taking the square on 10 January 1860, Zamora was shot in the head, which caused his death. The cause of his death remains a mystery. Some say that the bullet came from his own side, obeying orders from Falcón and Guzmán Blanco. His unexpected passing changed the positive direction of the war for the Federalists, and resulted in a loss. For many, he was considered the most important popular leader of 19th-century Venezuela, and his remains rest in the National Pantheon in Caracas.

== Legacy ==
In 2001, a new land reform program, under President Hugo Chávez, Mission Zamora, was named after Ezequiel Zamora.

Ezequiel Zamora was portrayed by Alexander Solórzano in the 2009 film Zamora: tierra y hombres libres.

== Emotional life ==
Zamora was engaged to Viviana González. They had a child, Nicolás Zamora González. He married Estefanía Falcón Zavarce, sister of the military and political leader Crisóstomo Falcón on July 4, 1856. They resided in Coro with their adopted children.
