= Falcón Zulia =

Falcón Zulia state (Estado Falcón – Zulia) was a state of Venezuela created by initiative of president Antonio Guzmán Blanco.

== History ==
- 1881: Faced with pressure from the Zulia state for greater autonomy, President Antonio Guzmán Blanco decrees its union with the Falcón state and the change of capital first to Casigua and then to Capatárida under the figure of the Falcón Zulia state. The capital of the Zulia state was Maracaibo, and Coro that of the Falcón state.
- 1883: Zulia state receives from Falcón state the Democracia Parish (Quisiro) which was incorporated into Altagracia Canton.
- 1890: President Raimundo Andueza Palacio gives autonomy to Zulia state and Maracaibo becomes the capital. Zulia state disappears and Quisiro definitely becomes part of the state.

== Territory ==
=== 1881–1883 ===
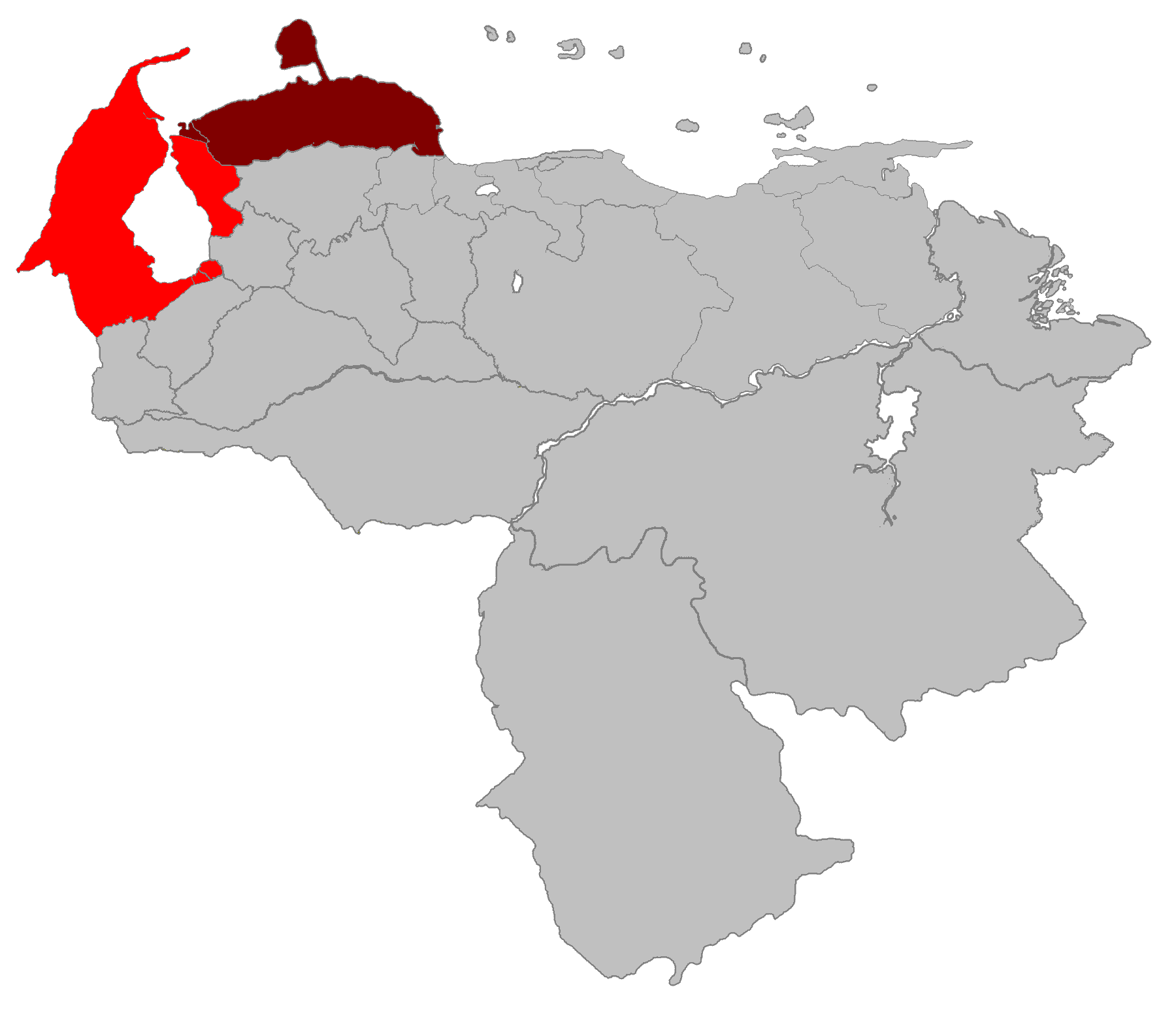

As repression to the calls against centralism, president Antonio Guzmán Blanco joined Falcón state and Zulia state into a combined state called Falcón-Zulia with the intent that Maracaibo had less autonomy. The capital was transferred to Casigua and later to Capatárida. Zulia became only a sub-region of the new state. In 1890, President Raimundo Andueza Palacio reestablished the autonomy of Zulia state with Maracaibo as its capital again. Zulia returned to its borders of 1881. In the map, the Zulia sub-region (and former State) is shown in red, which had Maracaibo as its former capital; the Falcón sub-region (and former State) is in brown. Capatárida is located in the western coat in Galcón State near the border with Zulia State almost equidistant between the former (and now current) capitals of Falcón and Zulia states, respectively, the cities of Coro and Maracaibo.

=== 1883–1890 ===
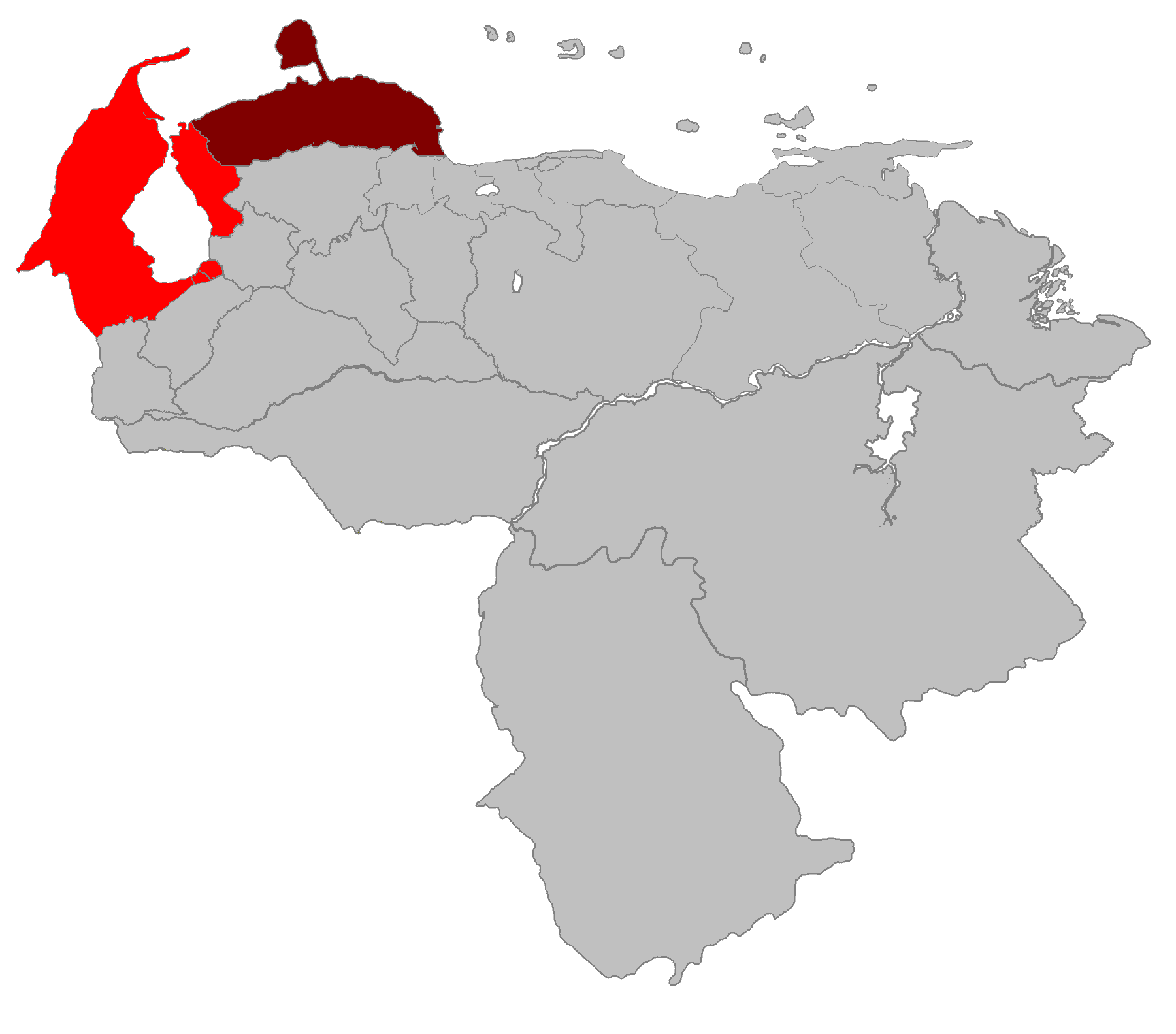

The Zulia state (in red), receives Democracia Parish from Falcón.

== Subdivisions ==
The state is divided into 2 sections:

- Sección Zulia
- Sección Falcón

The state are divided into cantons.

=== Cantons of Zulia ===
- Altagracia Canton
- Fraternidad Canton
- Gibraltar Canton
- Maracaibo Canton
- Perijá Canton

=== Cantons of Falcón ===
- Coro Canton
- Cumarebo Canton
- Costa Arriba Canton
- Casigua Canton
- San Luis Canton
- Paraguaná Canton
