= León de Febres Cordero =

Venezuelan Conservative general (1797–1872)

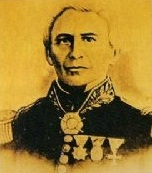
León de Febres Cordero (1797–1872)

León de Febres Cordero y Oberto (Los Puertos de Altagracia, Captaincy General of Venezuela, 28 June 1797 - Mérida, United States of Venezuela, 7 July 1872) was a Venezuelan Conservative general and politician who participated in the Spanish American wars of independence (1812–1824), the Gran Colombia–Peru War (1829), the Revolution of the Reforms (1835–1836) and the Federal War (1859–1863).

== Biography ==
After serving the Spanish Empire as a soldier, he participated in the 1820 October 9 Revolution which led to the independence of Guayaquil from Spain. Later, he fought in various battles of the liberation campaigns in different places in South America. He also held several minor political positions in various localities, until he served as a deputy to the Congress of Gran Colombia.

At the beginning of 1829 he was Chief of Staff of the Colombian Army. On 27 February he initiated the "Thirty Days Campaign" in the Gran Colombia–Peru War which culminated in the victory of the Battle of Tarqui. Promoted to Division General, he attended the negotiations which led to the Treaty of Girón.

Together with General José Antonio Páez he fought against the Revolution of the Reforms of 1835, and conquered the Castillo San Felipe in Puerto Cabello, which put an end to the revolt on 1 March 1836. Army commander of Maracaibo in 1842 and 1848, he rose up with General Páez against the Government of General José Tadeo Monagas but they were defeated in the Venezuelan civil war of 1848–1849. He was exiled to Curaçao and went from there to Peru where he remained for eight years.

He participated in the March 1858 Revolution and when the Federal War broke out, General Febres Cordero assumed command of the Conservative army that was first defeated in the Battle of Santa Inés (December 1859). But in February 1860, Febres Cordero defeated the Federals in the decisive Battle of Coplé.

On 31 October 1863, he resigned from military command and settled in Mérida with his family. He would not intervene in politics again. He lived in the greatest poverty and died on 7 July 1872, aged seventy-five. In 1942 his remains were buried in the National Pantheon of Venezuela.

== Sources ==
- Pérez Pimentel, Rodolfo. «FEBRES CORDERO Y OBERTO LEON». Diccionario Biográfico Ecuador. Guayaquil.
- Avilés Pino, Efrén: Enciclopedia del Ecuador – Febres-Cordero Crnel. León de
