= Antonio Guzmán Blanco =

President of Venezuela (1829–1899)

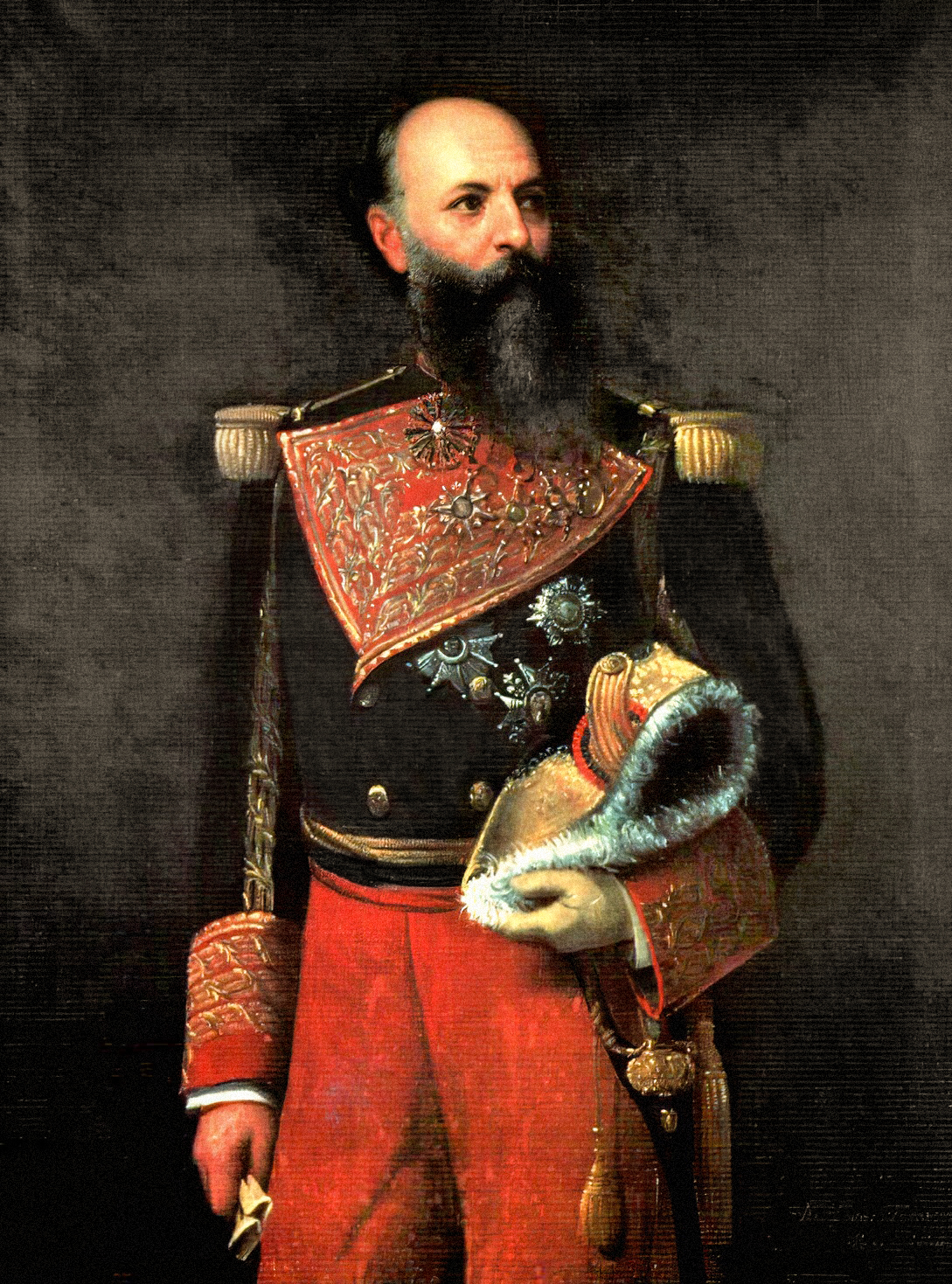
- Portrait by Martín Tovar y Tovar

19th, 22nd & 24th President of Venezuela
- In office 15 September 1886 – 8 August 1887
- Preceded by: Joaquín Crespo
- Succeeded by: Hermógenes López
- In office 26 February 1879 – 26 April 1884
- Preceded by: José Gregorio Valera
- Succeeded by: Joaquín Crespo
- In office 27 April 1870 – 27 February 1877
- Preceded by: Guillermo Tell Villegas
- Succeeded by: Francisco Linares Alcántara

Minister of Foreign Affairs
- In office 24 July 1867 – 3 October 1867
- President: Juan Crisóstomo Falcón
- Preceded by: Rafael Seijas
- Succeeded by: Rafael Seijas
- In office 21 January 1864 – 6 February 1864
- President: Juan Crisóstomo Falcón
- Preceded by: Guillermo Tell Villegas
- Succeeded by: Antonio María Salom
- In office 25 July 1863 – 7 August 1863
- President: Juan Crisóstomo Falcón
- Preceded by: Jesús María Morales Marcano
- Succeeded by: Guillermo Tell Villegas

Personal details
- Born: 28 February 1829 Caracas, Great Colombia
- Died: 28 July 1899 (aged 70) Paris, France
- Resting place: National Pantheon of Venezuela
- Party: Liberal Party
- Spouse: Ana Teresa Ibarra

Antonio Leocadio Guzmán Blanco (28 February 1829 – 28 July 1899) was a Venezuelan military leader, statesman, diplomat and politician. He was the president of Venezuela for three separate terms, from 1870 until 1877, from 1879 until 1884, and from 1886 until 1887 and General during the Venezuelan Federal War.

He was a member of the movement known as Liberalismo Amarillo.

== Early life and education ==
Guzmán was born in Caracas as the son of Antonio Leocadio Guzmán, a Venezuelan journalist, politician as well as founder of the Liberal Party and Carlota Blanco Jerez de Aristeguieta.

== Career ==
=== Military career and ambassador ===
He was banished by the administration of General Julián Castro, and accompanied General Juan Crisóstomo Falcón in his invasion of Venezuela, becoming his general secretary. After the final defeat of Falcón at the Battle of Coplé in September, 1860, Guzmán accompanied his chief in his flight, and was sent to the West Indies to solicit assistance. Toward the end of 1861 he landed again with Falcón on the coast of Coro, and after numerous engagements signed on 22 May 1863, the Treaty of Coche, by which arms were laid down, and a general assembly called at La Victoria, which elected Falcón president and Guzmán vice president. Guzmán was at the same time Minister of Finance, and went to London to negotiate a loan.

In 1863, he served as Minister of Foreign Affairs of Venezuela.

On 7 August, 1863, Guillermo Tell Villegas was appointed Minister of Foreign Affairs of Venezuela (Ministerio de Relaciones Exteriores) when he temporarily assumed the role of Guzman during Guzman's absence. Tell Villegas remained the 65th Minister of Foreign Affairs of Venezuela until 21 January 1864, when Guzman returned to the role to finish out his term.

Guzman was the Venezuelan ambassador to Spain from 1863 until 1866.

=== 1868-1877: Return to Venezuela and president ===
Upon his return he was for a short time in charge of the executive, and afterward was elected president of Congress. After the overthrow of Falcón in 1868, Guzmán left the country, but headed a revolution in 1869, and in 1870 became provisional president with extraordinary powers, ruling the country for seven years as a dictator.

In 1871 Blanco created by decree the Territorio Colón (Columbus Territory) which included Los Roques and other adjacent islands.

The Palacio Federal Legislativo, also known as the Capitolio, is a historic building in Caracas, Venezuela which now houses the National Assembly. It was built in 1872 by Guzman to a design by the architect Luciano Urdaneta Vargas. In 1876, under Guzmán, the Universidad de Caracas was moved to the Palacio de las Academias building, whose former colonial façade was rebuilt in the Neo-Gothic style.

=== 1878-1884: Second term as president ===
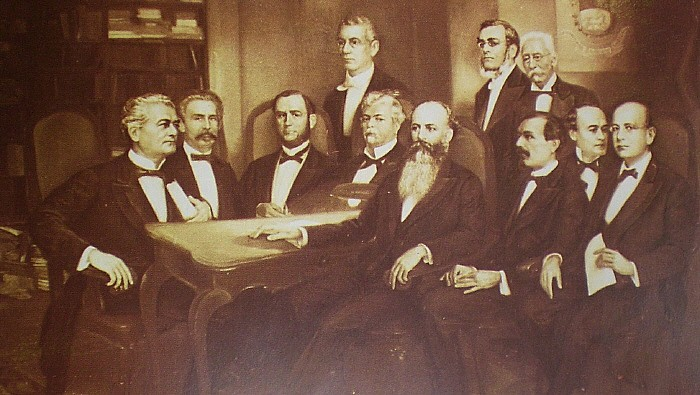
Guzman (center forefront) and his cabinet

His successor, General Francisco Linares Alcántara, died in office in December, 1878, and there were several revolutionary uprisings, till Guzmán assumed the government again.

The Venezuelan bolívar was made the national currency in 1879.

In 1880, Guzmán Blanco suppressed a military coup attempt by General José Pío Rebolledo.

Free and compulsory education for ages 7 to 14 was established by decree on 27 June 1880, under President Guzmán, and was followed by the creation of the Ministry of Public Instruction in 1881, also under Guzmán Blanco. In 15 years from 1870, the number of primary schools quadrupled to nearly 2000 and the enrolment of children expanded ten-fold, to nearly 100,000. Falcón Zulia was a state of Venezuela created by initiative of Guzmán in 1881.

He established the Order of the Liberator on 14 September 1880, which was the highest distinction of Venezuela and was appointed for services to the country, outstanding merit and benefits made to the community. "Gloria al Bravo Pueblo" (Glory to the Brave People) was adopted as Venezuela's national anthem by Guzmán on 25 May 1881.

In the elections of 1883 General Joaquín Crespo, one of his friends, was declared president, and Guzmán became ambassador to France, living with great ostentation in Paris.

=== 1885-1899: Third and final term ===
In 1886, he again assumed the presidency.

During the rule of Guzmán as governor of a few states (from 1871) in the late 1880s when he was known by the epithet "Illustrious American", Venezuela witnessed all round development (development of Caracas is largely attributed to him) and coffee production in Venezuela increased rapidly as there was an additional support in the form of loans from foreign countries.

According to some historians, Guzmán Blanco led a fairly steady Venezuelan government that was allegedly rife with corruption. Guzmán Blanco reportedly stole money from the treasury, abused his power, and, after a disagreement with a bishop, expelled any clergy who disagreed with him and seized property belonging to the Catholic Church. When facing severe disapproval during his administration, Guzmán Blanco ordered the body of Simon Bolivar to be exhumed and reburied in the National Pantheon of Venezuela to espouse Bolivar's ideals, despite the two men's opposing views.

His successor, the undistinguished Hermógenes López, was also understood to be under his influence.

== Politics and legacy ==
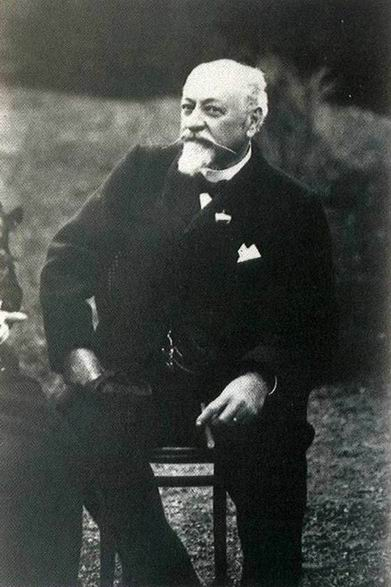
Guzman near the end of his life in 1895.

The autocratic nature of Guzmán's regimes was in sharp contradiction with the economic and legal reforms as well as with the achievements brought about. His government was responsible for the creation of the modern currency (bolívar), the restoration of the national anthem, the second national census, the La Guaira and Caracas Railway, the foundation of the Venezuelan Academy of the Language, the telephone service between Caracas and La Guaira, promotion of agriculture and education (Decree of Public and Obligatory Instruction of 1870), stimulus to commerce, and important public works (the National Pantheon, the Capitol, and the Municipal Theater, among others.)

According to historian Charles L. Davis, Guzman has been referred to as an example of a strongman politician.

Also a freemason, he sharply reduced the power of the Roman Catholic Church in Venezuela while in office.

== Personal life ==
Guzmán was married to Ana Teresa Ibarra Urbaneja, who served as First Lady of Venezuela from 1870 until 1877, 1879 until 1884, and 1887 until 1888. Due to his marriage he was brother in law with María Ibarra Urbaneja, who married Venezuelan banker Manuel Antonio Matos He is buried in Passy Cemetery in France.

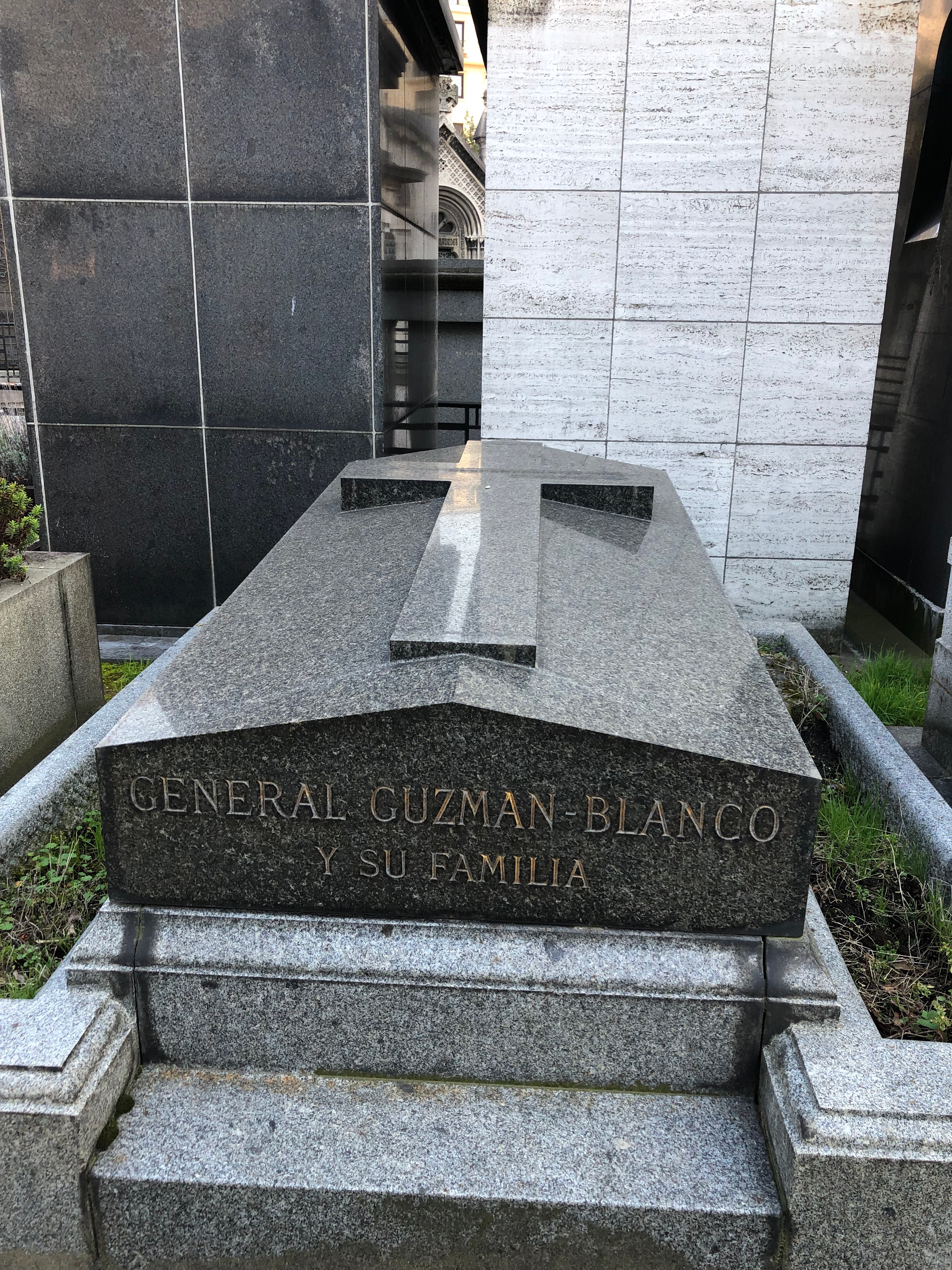
Antigua tumba de Guzmán Blanco. Cementerio de Passy, París

After a hundreds years, his remains now rest at the National Pantheon.

Towards the end of the nineteenth century Guzmán built a country house in the region of Antímano, calling it "La Pequeña Versalles" (Little Versailles). Despite being declared a National Monument, the house fell into disuse after Guzman's death and was eventually restored in 2004, the building being turned into a sociocultural complex and sports facility.

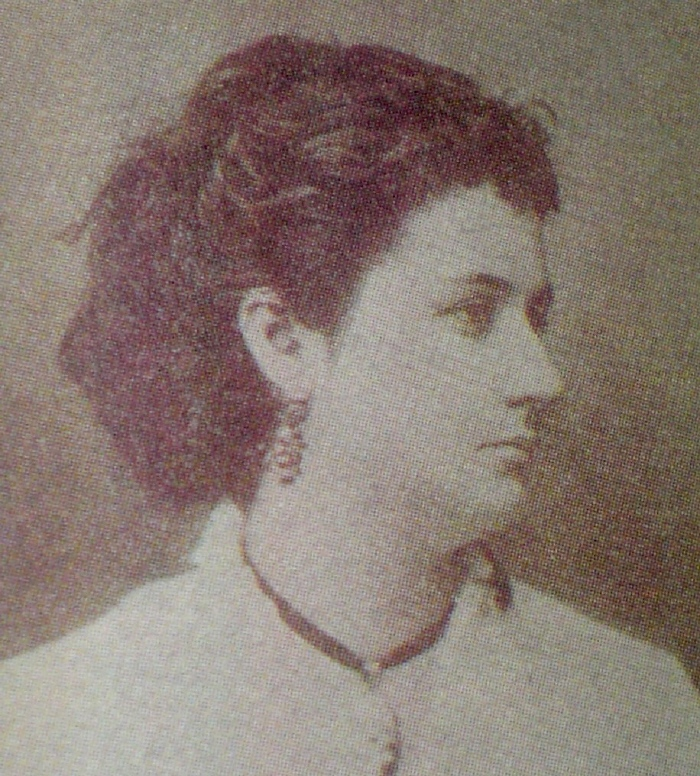
Ana Teresa Ibarra Urbaneja, Guzman's wife and repeat First Lady of Venezuela

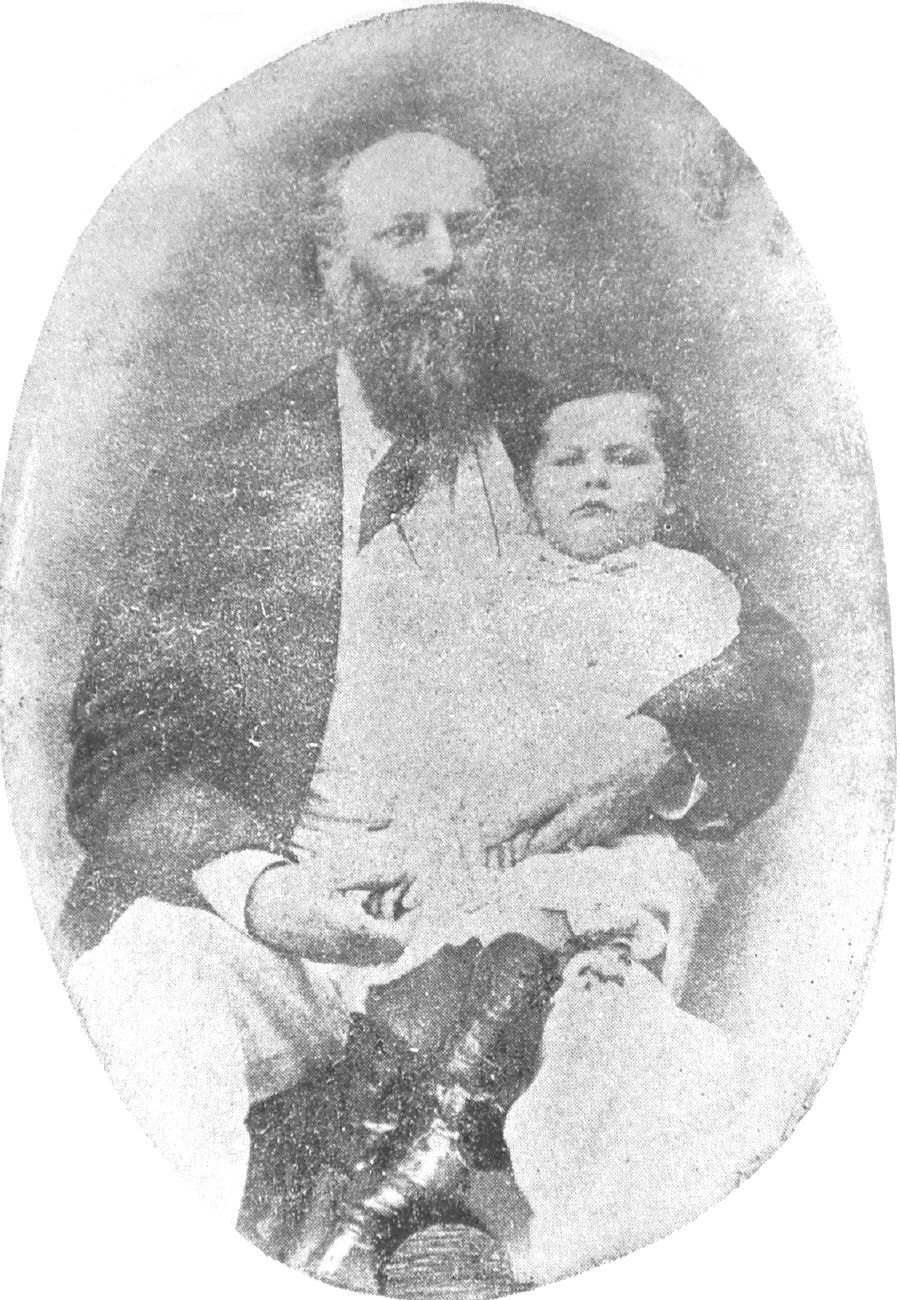
Guzman with one of his daughters

== Gallery ==
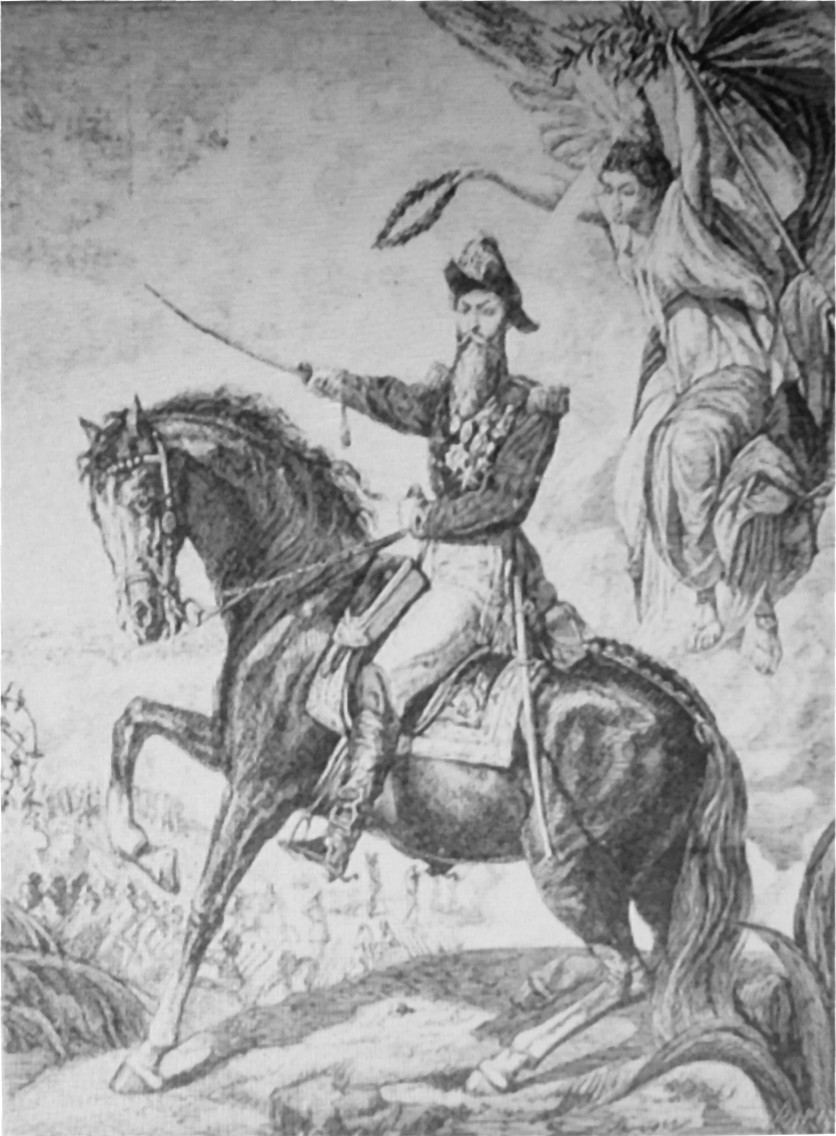
1872 depiction of Guzman in battle at the Batalla de Apure

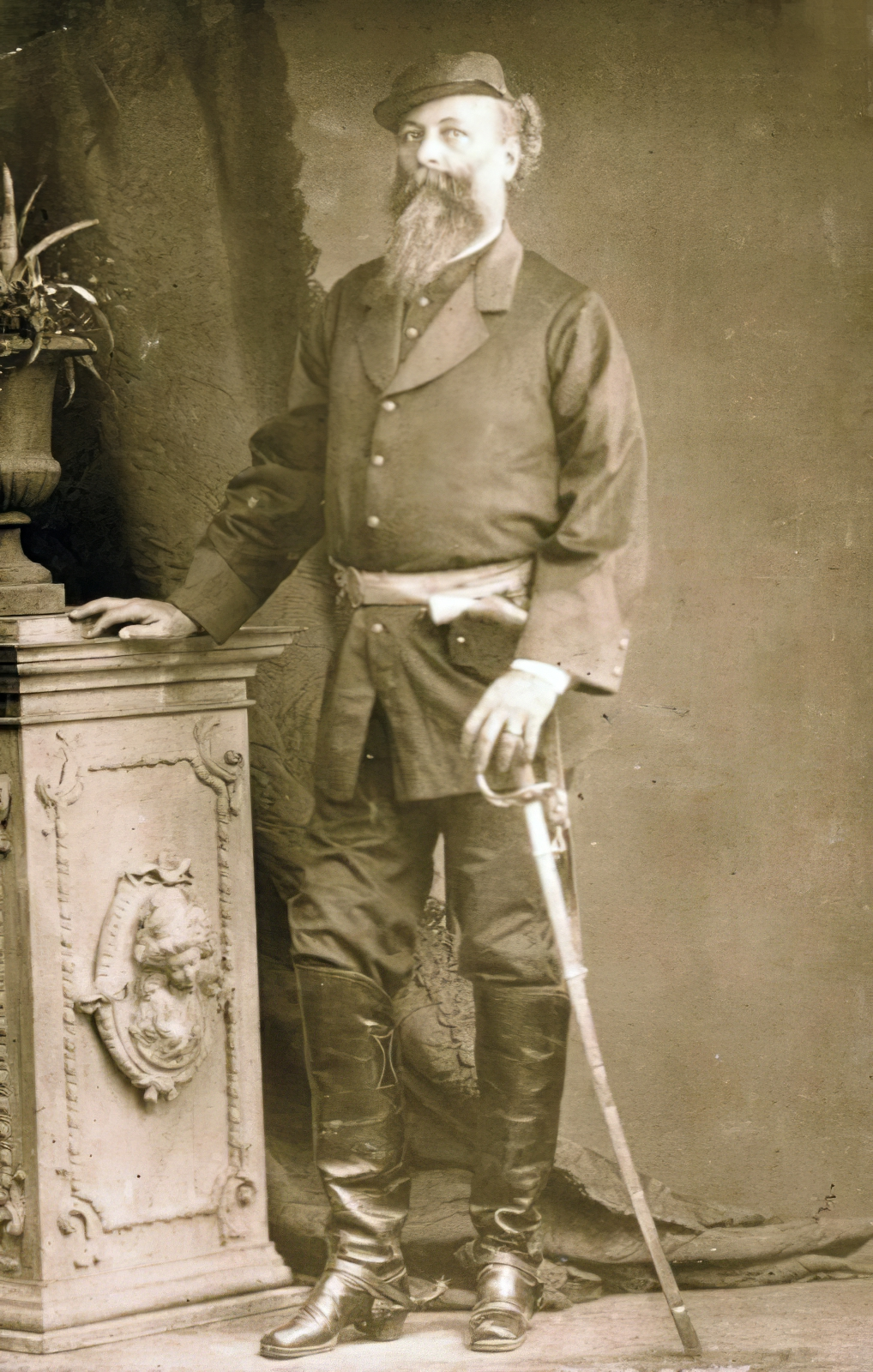
Guzman in 1872

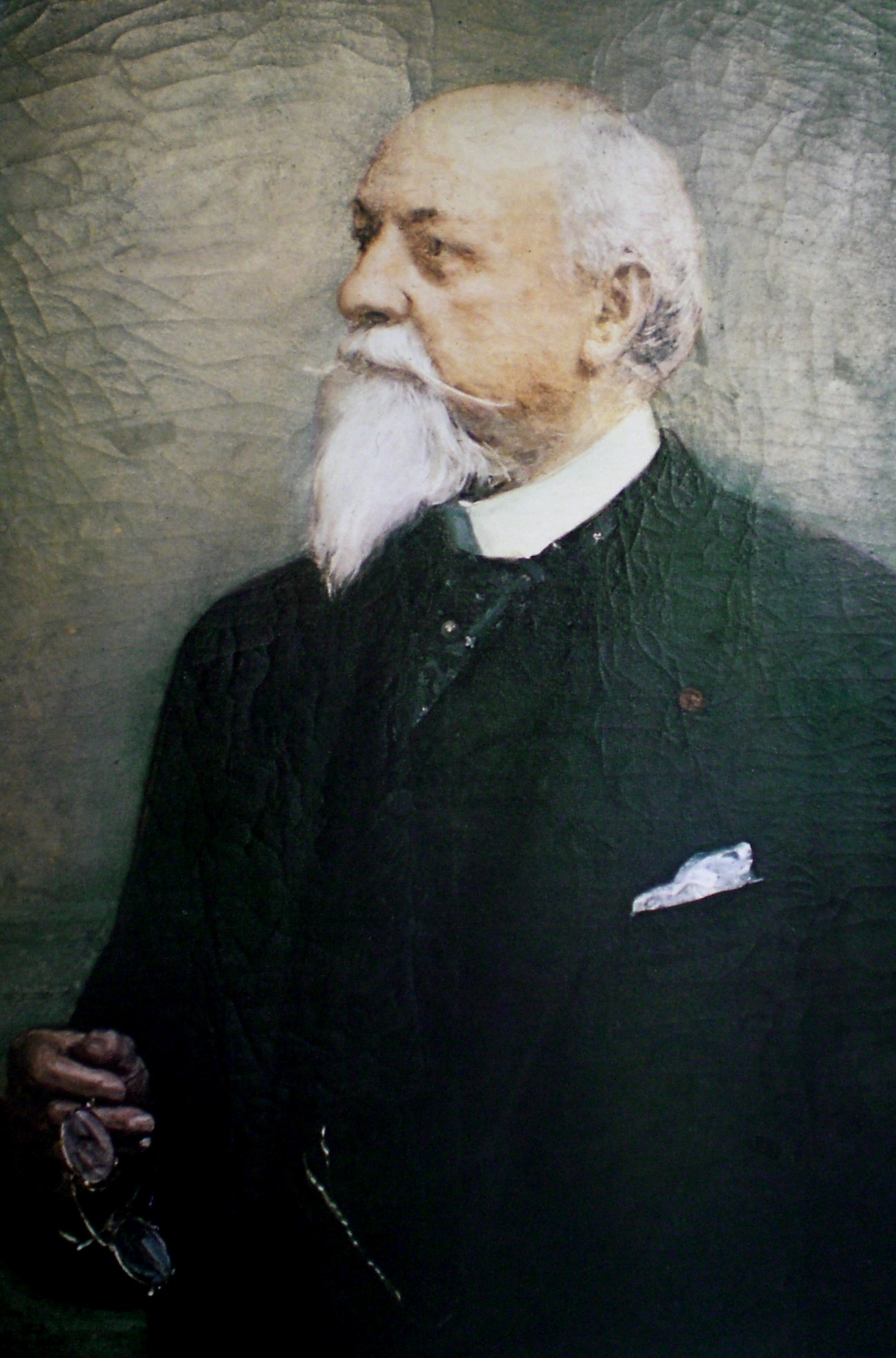
Antonio Guzmán Blanco by V. Rodríguez, 1908

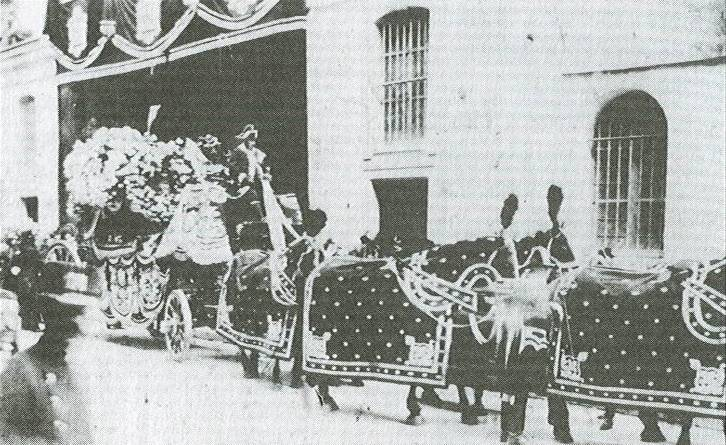
Guzman's funeral in 1899

== See also ==
- List of presidents of Venezuela
- History of Roman Catholicism in Venezuela
- List of ministers of foreign affairs of Venezuela
- List of state leaders in 1870 - 1871 - 1872 - 1873 - 1874 - 1875 - 1876 - 1877
- List of state leaders in 1880 - 1887
- List of people on the postage stamps of Venezuela
- List of people from Caracas
- List of Venezuelans
- List of ambassadors of Venezuela to Spain
- List of Freemasons (A–D)

Political offices
| Preceded by Jesús María Morales Marcano | 64th Minister of Foreign Affairs of Venezuela; 25 July 1863 – 7 August 1863 | Succeeded by Guillermo Tell Villegas |
| Preceded by Guillermo Tell Villegas | 66th Minister of Foreign Affairs of Venezuela; 21 January 1864 – 6 February 1864 | Succeeded by Antonio María Salom |
| Preceded by Rafael Seijas | 71st Minister of Foreign Affairs of Venezuela; 24 July 1867 – 3 October 1865 | Succeeded by Rafael Seijas |
