= Treaty of Coche =

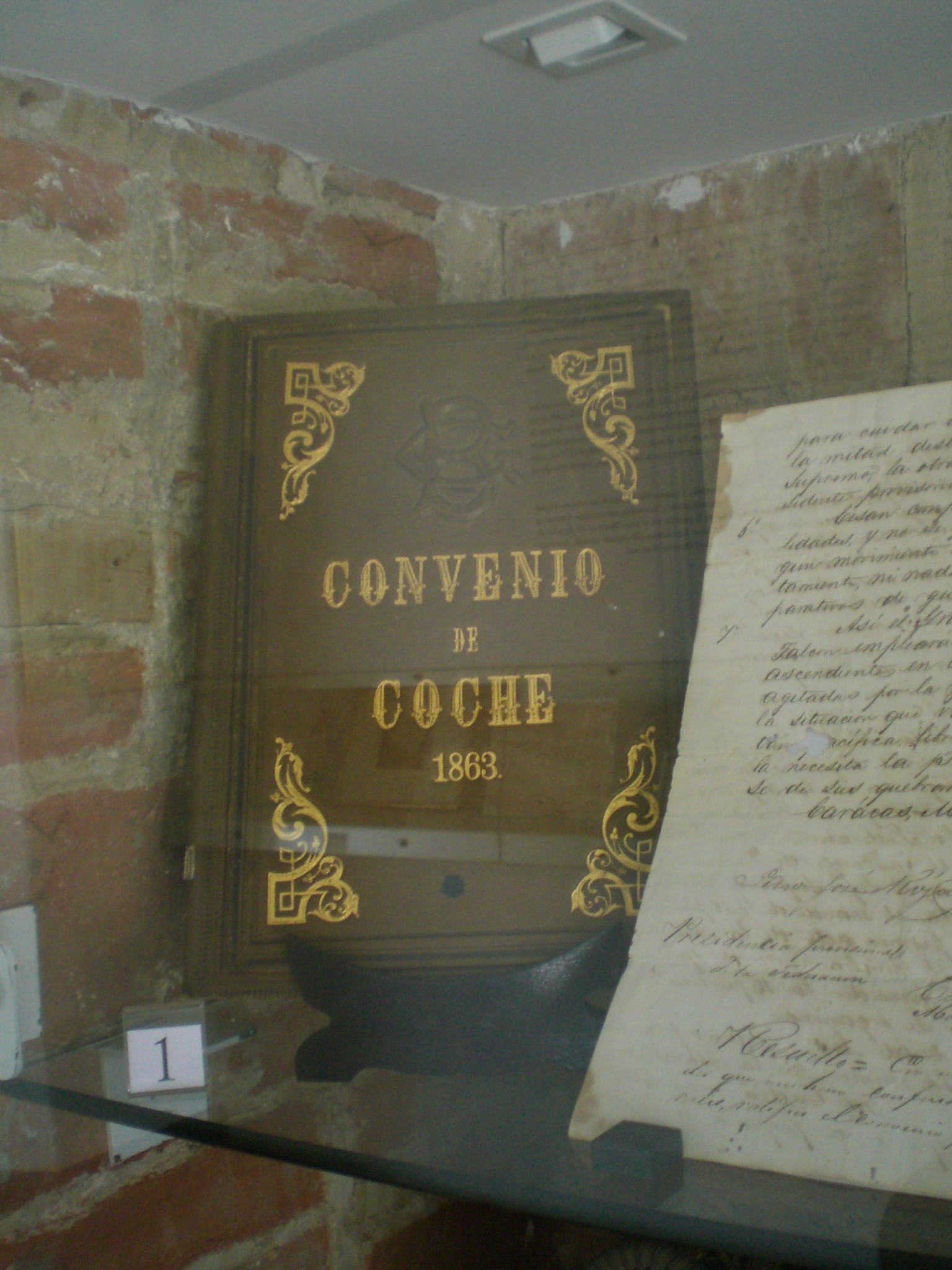
- Book with the minutes of the Coche Treaty preserved by the John Boulton Foundation, Caracas, Venezuela.
- Context: Peace Treaty that concluded the Federal civil War (1859-63) in Venezuela
- Signed: 23 April 1863
- Location: Coche, Caracas, Venezuela
- Sealed: 25 May 1863
- Signatories: Pedro José Rojas; Antonio Guzmán Blanco
- Parties: Conservative Government; Liberal Federalist rebels

The Treaty of Coche was an agreement that formally established the end of the Federal War in Venezuela.

The name of the treaty originates from the fact that it was made at the estate of Coche, in that period very close to Caracas, and today part of the Parish of Coche in Caracas.
The agreement was initially made on 23 April 1863, between, on the one hand for the Conservatives, Pedro José Rojas, Secretary General of the Supreme Chief of the Republic: José Antonio Páez, and on the other hand for the Liberals, Antonio Guzmán Blanco, Secretary General of the Provisional President of the Federation: Juan Crisóstomo Falcón, and later confirmed by both Páez and Falcón on 25 May 1863.

== History ==
In 1863, after the four-year-long Federal War, the military victory of the Liberal Federalist forces was imminent, and the Venezuelan country was thoroughly destroyed, with more than 150,000 people dead, and many cities deserted and destroyed. Representatives of Juan Crisóstomo Falcón and José Antonio Páez met behind closed doors and reached an agreement to achieve definitive peace, and convene a National Assembly or Congress, which would be made up of 80 members, of which half would be elected by the Supreme chief of the Republic (Páez) and the other half by the Provisional President of the Federation (Falcón). It was also agreed that Páez should resign as President to facilitate the transition process.

== Consequences ==
- The victory of the Liberals and the return of the Liberal Party to power.
- The definitive peace, that Venezuela needed so much, was achieved.
- New recruitments were ended, and even forbidden.
- Reduction of the Central government army.
- Public order brigades were formed to prevent any outbreak of violence.
- Despite the long-awaited peace having been achieved, a large part of the Venezuelan population abandoned the countryside for fear of becoming victims of more bloody fighting.
- Further indebtedness of the country, as it requested a new loan from the English company Matheson & Company.
