= Federal War =

Civil War in Venezuela

- Part of the Venezuelan civil wars
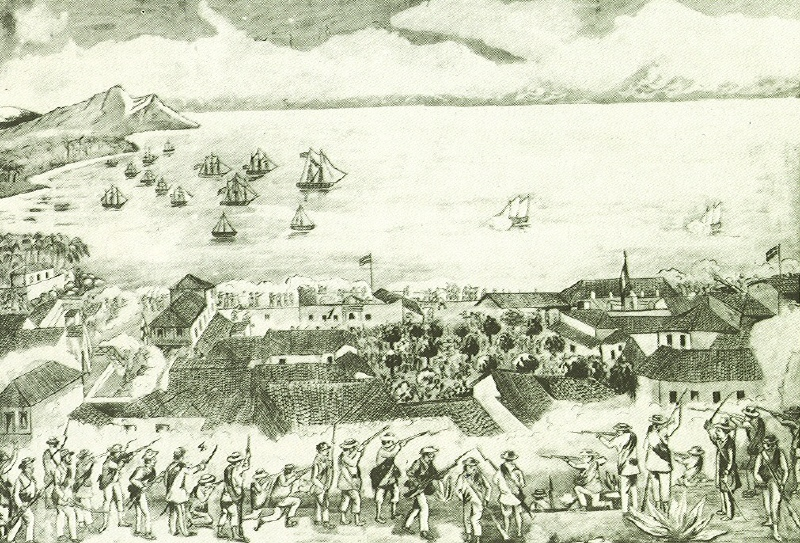
- Combat of Maiquetía, during the beginning of the Federal War, 2 September 1859
| Date | 20 February 1859 – 24 April 1863 |
| Location | Mainly the Barinas, Portuguesa, Cojedes, Apure and Guárico states of Venezuela |
| Result | Treaty of Coche, establishment of a Federalist government |

Belligerents
| (Venezuela) Federalists | (Venezuela) Conservative Government |

Commanders and leaders
| Ezequiel Zamora †; Juan Crisóstomo Falcón; Antonio Guzmán Blanco; Francisco Linares Alcántara; Manuel Ezequiel Bruzual; Juan Antonio Sotillo | Julián Castro; José Antonio Páez; Pedro Gual Escandón; Manuel Felipe de Tovar; León de Febres Cordero |

Casualties and losses
- 100,000+ dead

The Federal War (Spanish: Guerra Federal) — also known as the Great War or the 5 Year War — was a civil war in Venezuela between the Conservative Party and the Liberal Party over the monopoly the Conservatives held over government positions and land ownership, and their intransigence in granting any reforms. This drove the Liberals – known as the Federalists – to look for greater autonomy for the provinces: a new federalism for Venezuela, as it were. It was the biggest and bloodiest civil war that Venezuela had since its independence from Spain on 5 July 1811. Around a hundred thousand people died in the violence of the war, or from hunger or disease, in a country with a population of just over a million people.

The conflict was a struggle for power between the conservative government of President Julián Castro, who had ousted his predecessor José Tadeo Monagas in March 1858, and the liberal opposition led by Ezequiel Zamora.

The Liberals initially gained the upper hand, winning several battles in 1859, until their crushing defeat in the Battle of Coplé in February 1860. After this defeat and the death of Ezequiel Zamora, the new Liberal leader Juan Crisóstomo Falcón switched to guerrilla warfare, that by 1863 had weakened the government troops and caused the desertion of thousands of their soldiers. This forced the Conservative leader José Antonio Páez to sue for peace.

== Struggles in the government and society ==
Venezuela was facing many social and governmental struggles during this time period. Many factors contributed to the start of the war within the country, including social problems inherited from the struggle for independence, tensions among the diverse economic and political groups, a succession of armed movements in rural areas, and the hopes for a change in the government structure which was a centralist-federalist government.

== Course of the war ==
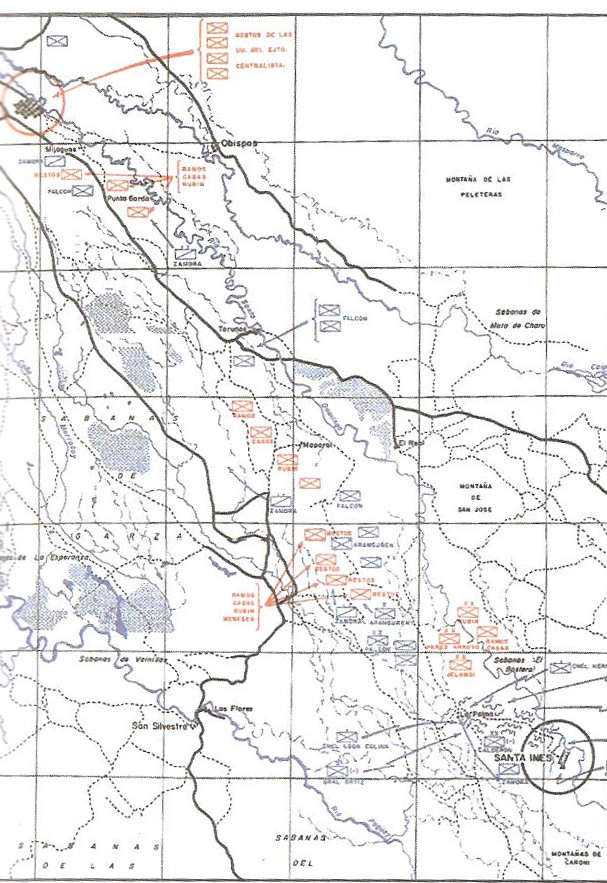
Battle of Santa Inés, the first major conflict during the Federal War

=== 1859 ===
On 20 February 1859, Lieutenant Colonel Tirso Salaverría occupied the northern Venezuelan military base in Coro and proclaimed the creation of a federation, the abolition of the death penalty, universal suffrage and political pluralism. As a result, fighting broke out in various parts of the country, starting the Federal War in Venezuela. The first major battle was the Battle of Santa Inés on 10 December 1859. The Federalists, led by General Ezequiel Zamora, won. Zamora was able to consolidate his control of the Llanos and prepare the Liberals' advance north.

=== 1860 ===
Zamora's troops besieged the city of San Carlos for a week in January 1860. Ezequiel Zamora was killed by a sniper on 10 January 1860 and the Federalists had to break off the siege.

After Zamora's death, his brother-in-law, General Juan Crisóstomo Falcón, took command of the insurgent troops. Since they were weakened after the unsuccessful attack on San Carlos, Falcón decided to avoid battle and wait for reinforcements from a contingent under General Juan Antonio Sotillo. The government troops under General Febres Cordero went after Falcón. At Coplé, a crossroads between Calabozo, Camaguán and Guayabal, the Battle of Coplé was fought on 17 February 1860, in which the government troops were victorious.

Nevertheless, the defeated Federalists managed to withdraw in an orderly manner. Falcón changed his strategy: guerrilla warfare instead of pitched battles. On trips to Colombia, Haiti and the Caribbean, he sought and found help to continue the war.

=== 1861 ===
Falcón returned to Venezuela in July 1861. The Federalists consolidated their positions so that their units could make more and more advances against the government troops. The first peace negotiations took place in December 1861, but were unsuccessful.

=== 1862 ===
During 1862, the Federalists won several victories, namely at Pureche, El Corubo, Mapararí and Buchivacoa.

=== 1863 ===
The government troops were now weakened by the long guerrilla war and the desertion of thousands of soldiers. When the Federalists surrounded Coro in April 1863, the Conservatives were willing to negotiate. On 22 May 1863, President José Antonio Páez and General Falcón signed the Peace Treaty of Coche (named after an estate not far from Caracas), which sealed the victory of the Liberals. Falcón became the new President.

== End of the war ==
The Federal War in Venezuela went on for four years until April 1863 due to the signing of the treaty of Coche that put an end to it. Many changes came with the end of the war:

- Juan Crisóstomo Falcón becomes president of Venezuela on 15 June 1863
- Abolition of the death penalty.
- Establishment of the Federation, with the entry into force of the constitution of 1864.
- Shortage of the agricultural activity in the plains due to the fires.
- Decrease in foreign trade.
- Reduction of the central government army.

== Important people ==
Ezequiel Zamora was the Federalist who won the Battle of Santa Ines in 1859. Zamora was a Venezuelan soldier and leader of the Federalists in the Federal War. Through his friendship with the lawyer José Manuel García, Zamora learned a lot about philosophy and the foundations of Roman law, and he soon advocated for the "principles of equality" and the need for Venezuela to have this implemented. He was named the Federalists' "Chief Operating Officer of the West" after the battles he won there.

León de Febres Cordero was an army and political conservative from Venezuela who was a key leader in the war for independence of the country. He was also a key person in the Federal War and won many battles for the Conservatives including the battle of Coplé. Leon lost the battle of Santa Inés, where he retreated to save his troops. Later, he regathered strength, and in Caracas, Febres Cordero defeated the Federalists and celebrated victory in the battle of Coplé.

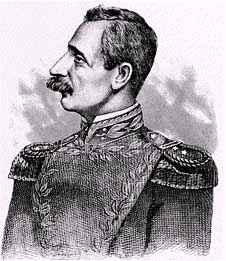
Ezequiel Zamora, the federalist who won the battle of Santa Inés, 1859.

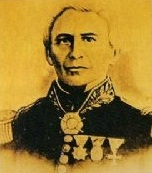
León de Febres Cordero y Oberto, the leader of the conservatives who won the battle of Coplé.

== Sources ==
- Micheal Tarver, Julia Frederick: The History of Venezuela. Palgrave MacMillan, New York 2006, ISBN 1-4039-6260-X, p 67.
- Malcolm Deas: Venezuela, Colombia and Ecuador: the first half-century of independence. In: The Cambridge History of Latin America. Band 3: From Independence to c. 1870. Cambridge University Press, Cambridge 1985, ISBN 0-521-23224-4, p 525–526.
- Frédérique Langue: Histoire du Venezuela. De la conquête à nos jours. Ed. L’Harmattan, Paris Langue, ISBN 2-7384-7432-2, p 397.
- Orlando Araujo: Venezuela. Die Gewalt als Voraussetzung der Freiheit. Suhrkamp, Frankfurt am Main 1971, p 32.
