= Antonio Leocadio Guzmán =

Venezuelan politician, journalist and military leader

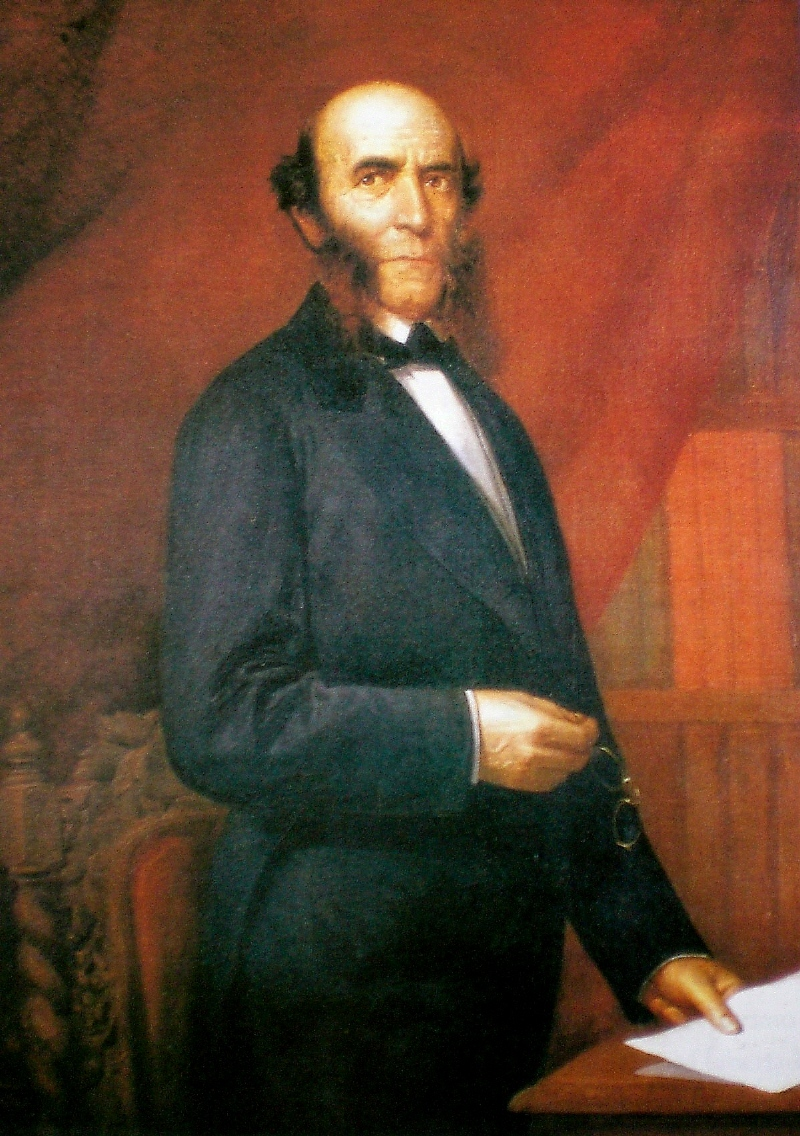

Vice President of Venezuela
- In office 1847–1851
- President: José Tadeo Monagas
- Preceded by: Diego Bautista Urbaneja
- Succeeded by: Joaquín Herrera
- In office 1863–1868
- President: Juan Crisóstomo Falcón
- Preceded by: Pedro Gual Escandón
- Succeeded by: Office disestablished Eventually Jesús Ramón Ayala

Minister of Foreign Affairs of Venezuela
- In office 31 October 1848 – 5 February 1849
- President: José Tadeo Monagas
- In office 6 May 1870 – 16 September 1872
- President: Antonio Guzmán Blanco

Personal details
- Born: 5 November 1801 Caracas, Province of Caracas, Captaincy General of Venezuela, Viceroyalty of New Granada, Spanish Empire
- Died: 13 November 1884 (aged 83) Caracas, Federal District, Venezuela
- Party: Liberal Party

Antonio Leocadio Guzmán Águeda (Caracas, Venezuela, November 5, 1801 - November 13, 1884) was a Venezuelan politician, journalist, and military leader. He was the father of Antonio Guzmán Blanco. He was the founder of the Liberal Party. From 1847 until 1851, he was the vice president of Venezuela, under president José Tadeo Monagas.

He was a candidate in the fraudulent 1846 Venezuelan presidential election. His supporters rebelled after his loss in the election.

== Early life and education ==
Antonio Leocadio Guzmán Águeda was born in Caracas on November 5, 1801. He was the son of Josefa Agueda Garcia and Antonio de Mata Guzmán, known as captain of the Queen battalion quartered in Caracas. In 1812 Guzman was sent to Spain by his father to avoid difficulties in Venezuela, where he was educated by liberal tutors in the Iberian Peninsula. He returned to Caracas in 1823.

== See also ==
- List of ministers of foreign affairs of Venezuela

Political offices
Preceded by Diego Bautista Urbaneja	Vice President of Venezuela; 1847-1851	Succeeded by Joaquín Herrera
Preceded by Pedro Gual Escandón	Vice President of Venezuela; 1863-1868	Succeeded by Isaías Rodríguez
Preceded by Rafael Acevedo	Minister of Foreign Affairs of Venezuela; 31 October 1848 – 5 February 1849	Succeeded by Ramón Yepes
Preceded by Diego Bautista Barrios	Minister of Foreign Affairs of Venezuela; 6 May 1870 – 16 September 1872	Succeeded by Diego Bautista Barrios
