= Battle of Santa Inés =

1859 battle of Venezuela's Federal War

- Part of the Federal War
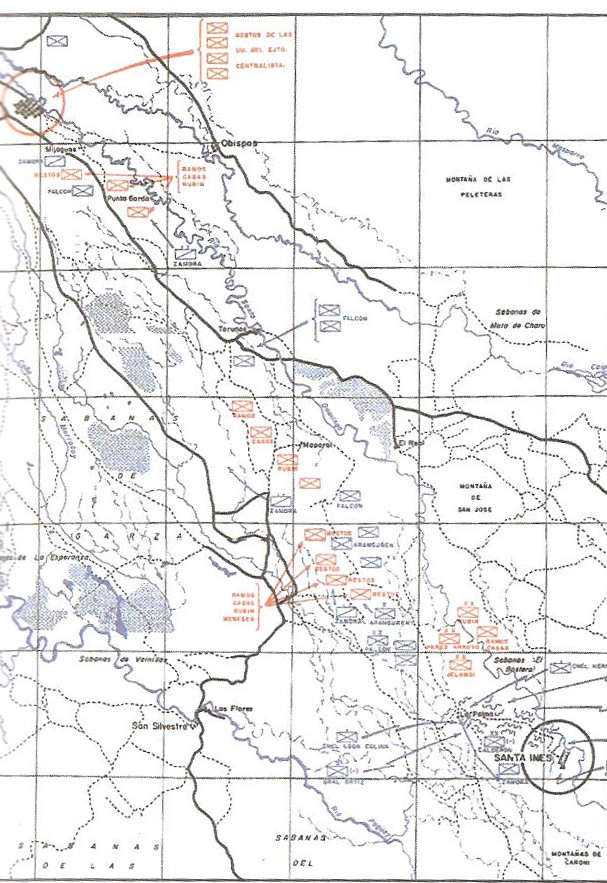
- Map of the Battle of Santa Inés
Date	December 9–10, 1859
Location	Santa Inés, Venezuela
Result	Federalist victory

Belligerents
Federalist Rebels	Conservative Government

Commanders and leaders
Ezequiel Zamora	Pedro Estanislao Ramos

Strength
2,500 soldiers	3,200 soldiers

Casualties and losses
200 casualties	800 casualties and 1,400 wounded and prisoners

The Battle of Santa Inés was a battle in Venezuela, which occurred between December 9 and 10, 1859, during the Federal War between the Federalist forces under General Ezequiel Zamora, and the troops from Conservative government under command of General Pedro Estanislao Ramos, with a victory for the former.

== Background ==
=== Rebel Army ===
Once the forces had been gathered in Guanare in mid-November 1859, Generals Juan Crisóstomo Falcón and Ezequiel Zamora moved to Barinas, followed by the Western Government Army, whose commander, General Pedro Estanislao Ramos, received the order to confront and defeat them. After finishing their retreat movement, the Federalist army settled in Santa Inés, located about 36 km southwest of the city of Barinas, on the right bank of the Santo Domingo River. The Federalist forces' regrouping was completed on December 9.

It was then that General Zamora took a defensive position and formulated a plan that consisted of a withdrawal, executed by the front line troops, to attract the attacker to an area where they would be destroyed by a counterattack. The front line troops, in addition to channeling the action of the attackers, needed to cause as much damage as possible, by means of using the forces in three successive lines of trenches, having a fourth line which would be the final position and from where the attacker would receive the maximum firepower and final blow, increased by the reserve forces from the preceding lines.

To comply with the above plan of attack, General Zamora made the following proposals: The advance trench was to be located in the village of La Palmas, and it was to be commanded by Colonels Jesús M. Hernández and León Colina. A little further back, in a sugar mill and a caney, the first line was organized under command of General Ignacio Antonio Ortiz; the second line to be commanded by General Rafael Petit was about 900 meters back; the third line to be led by General Pedro Aranguren was formed at another 800 meters beyond, at a crossroads; finally the fourth line, 800 meters from the crossroads, where the town was, was to be the reserve. According to the plan prepared by Zamora, upon presentation of the attacker in La Palma, the Federalist troops would offer little resistance and redeploy to the first position; who would then be delivered to the attacker, after some resistance the defenders would occupy the second position; then they would redeploy to the third just as in the previous line. This would leave the attackers at the mercy of the coup de grace by the reserve. This was the first time that the tactic of digging defensive trenches was performed in Latin America.

=== Battle ===
On December 8, the Centralist army spent the night in the village of San Lorenzo, on the left bank of the Santo Domingo River. The next morning, the river level dropped and the Centralist forces advanced towards La Palma, where they made contact with the advance guards, who abandoned their position and retreated to the sugar mill. The attackers set up camp in La Palma.
On the 10th, they restarted the attack, contact was made with the defenders of the mill (first position), who retreated after having caused a large number of casualties amongst the attackers. Once the action against the first position was concluded, the attackers continued on the next position (second); This was also taken after a bloody battle. The task of the attackers now consists of conquering the third position, the crossroads, which was better defended than those that had been taken.
General Ramos engaged in thorough combat with artillery support; but the position could not be taken. The attack carried out by Ramos, against an intricate entrenchment, efficiently combined with a barrage, degenerated into the most complete failure.The casualties exceeded a third of his troops. Finally convinced of the fruitlessness of his enterprise, General Ramos ordered the withdrawal, which took place at midnight that day. On the 11th at dawn, having noticed the absence of the attackers, Zamora went in pursuit of the remants of the Centralist Army of the West.

=== Consequences ===
General Ramos was seriously injured, had lost all his artillery and a large number of horses, and ordered the withdrawal to Barinas, which was reached by less than 2,000 troops, being chased by rebels. The city was besieged on December 23. After that, Zamora left with 6,000 men from Barinas to Caracas, taking more places on his way. However, Zamora was killed during the Siege of San Carlos on January 10 and the Federalists would be defeated at the Battle of Coplé on February 17, 1860.

== See also ==
- Federal War
