= Battle of Coplé =

- Part of the Federal War
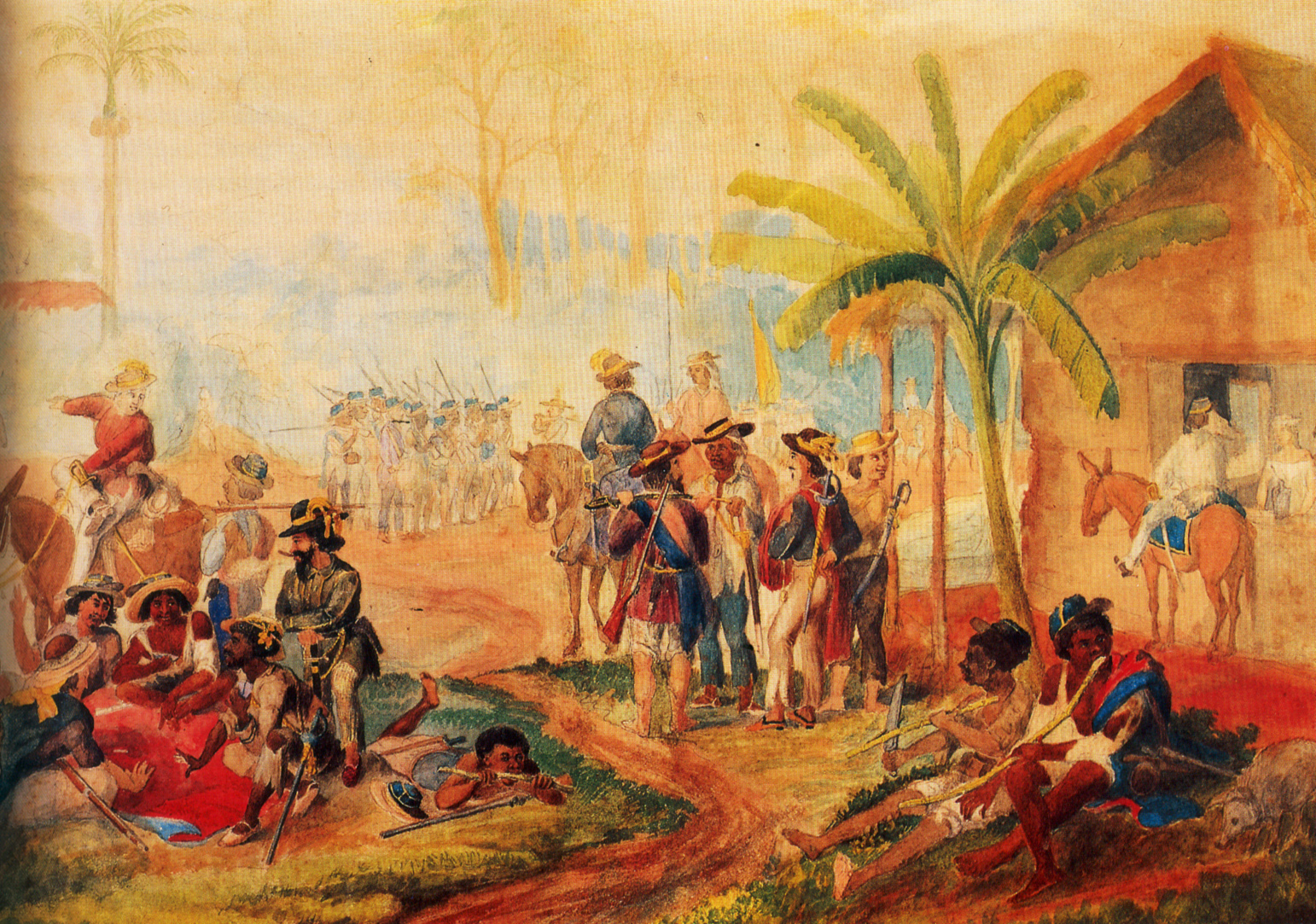
- Watercolor drawing from around 1860, representing Federalist soldiers, during the Federal War
Date	17 February 1860
Location	Coplé lagoon, near Calabozo, Venezuela
Result	Conservative Government victory

Belligerents
Federalist Rebels	Conservative Government

Commanders and leaders
Juan Crisóstomo Falcón	León de Febres Cordero

Strength
5,400 soldiers	5,000 soldiers

Casualties and losses
2,200 killed, wounded or prisoner	Unknown

The Battle of Coplé was a battle in Venezuela, which occurred on 17 February 1860, during the Federal War between the Federalist forces under General Juan Crisóstomo Falcón, and the troops from Conservative government under command of General León de Febres Cordero, with a victory for the latter.

== The battle ==
The Federalists, after a victorious first campaign, concluded with a victory in the Battle of Santa Inés on 10 December 1859, lost their best military leader Ezequiel Zamora, killed by a sniper during the siege of the town of San Carlos. Juan Crisóstomo Falcón, militarily less talented than his predecessor, took over as head of the Federalist army. Falcón advanced towards Valencia, but so slowly that it gave the Government the opportunity to organize a new army.

Both armies met near the Coplé lagoon, and the Federalist army was completely defeated by the Conservatives after a 55-minute battle. Although their troops were not pursued by the victors, the rout led to the disintegration of the Federalist army, while Falcón and several other leaders of the rebellion fled Venezuela, to seek refuge in the Granadine Confederation (Colombia).

== Consequences ==
After the Battle of Coplé, the Federal War transformed mainly into guerrilla warfare until the end of 1862, when the Federalists had regained enough strength to fight and win the Battle of Buchivacoa, the third and last major engagement of the war.
