= Juan Crisóstomo Falcón =

President of Venezuela (1820-1870)

Juan Crisóstomo Falcón Zavarce
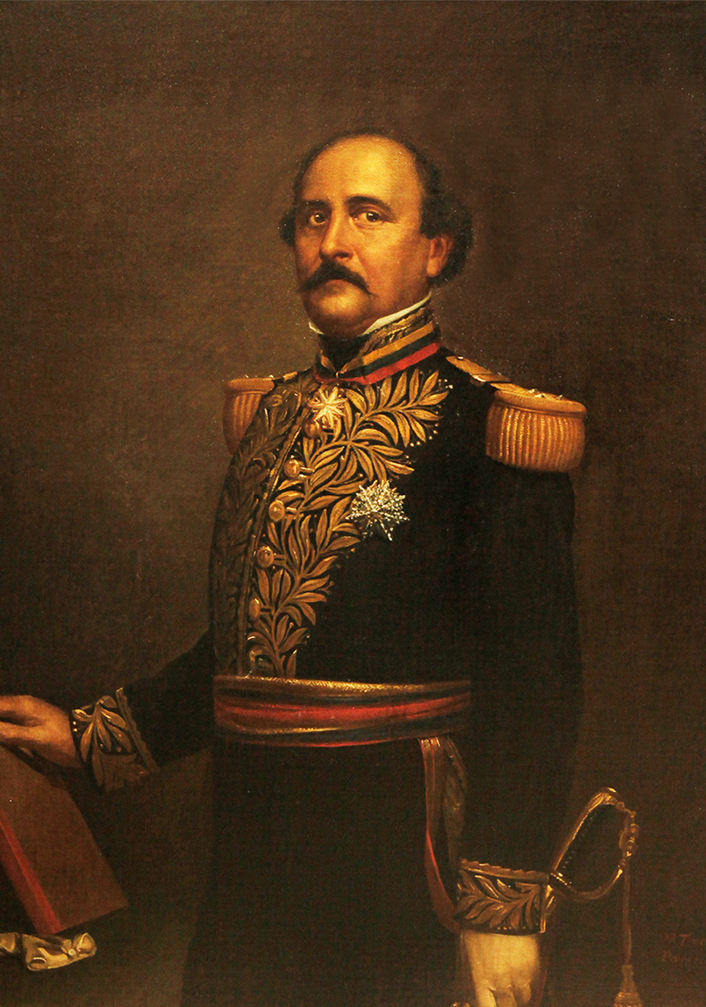
- Portrait by Martín Tovar y Tovar

16th President of Venezuela
- In office 15 June 1863 – 25 April 1868
- Preceded by: José Antonio Páez
- Succeeded by: Manuel Ezequiel Bruzual

Personal details
- Born: 27 January 1820 Hato Tabe, Province of Maracaibo, Departament of Venezuela, Gran Colombia
- Died: 29 April 1870 (aged 50) Fort-de-France, Martinique
- Resting place: National Pantheon of Venezuela
- Party: Liberal Party
- Spouse: Luisa Isabel Pachano Muñoz

Military service
- Branch/service: Venezuelan Army
- Years of service: 1848-1863 (active)
- Rank: Marshal

Juan Crisóstomo Falcón Zavarce (27 January 1820 – 29 April 1870) was the president of Venezuela from 1863 to 1868.

== Biography ==
Falcón was a member of the Liberal Venezuelan Federalist Party, and had been exiled to Curaçao after the Conservative March Revolution of 1858. At the outbreak of the Federal War, he returned to Venezuela as the supreme chief of the rebel movement in August 1859. When his military leader Ezequiel Zamora, was killed in January 1860, Falcón, also took over as head of the Federalist army. His suffered a crushing defeat in the Battle of Coplé in February 1860, after which his army disintegrated.

After the Battle of Coplé, the Federal War transformed mainly into a successful guerrilla warfare campaign, which ended in a victory for the Federalists in 1863, and the Treaty of Coche, which made him the new President of Venezuela.

He served as the recognized president of Venezuela from 1863 to 1868, when the conservative Blue Revolution headed by General José Tadeo Monagas ended his term as president. Also, he was briefly overthrown in 1865. At the end of his presidential term, Falcón emigrated to Europe. He died in Martinique in 1870. The state of Falcón is named after him.

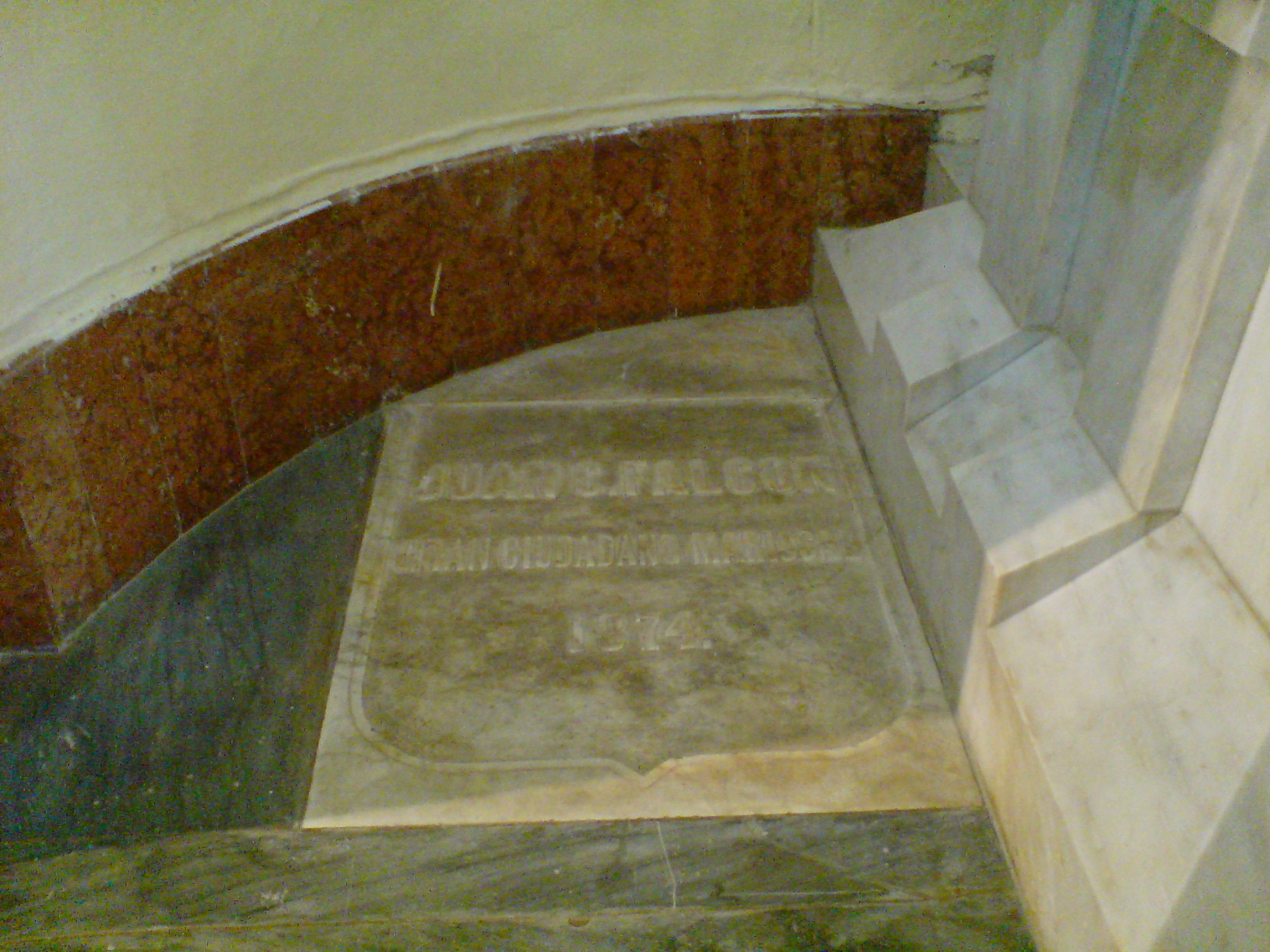
Juan Crisóstomo Falcón's tombstone

In 1863, under the presidency of Juan Crisóstomo Falcon Zavarce, Venezuela became the first country to abolish capital punishment for all crimes, including serious offenses against the state.

== Personal life ==
Falcón Zavarce was married to Luisa Isabel Pachano Muñoz, who served as First Lady of Venezuela from 1863 to 1868.

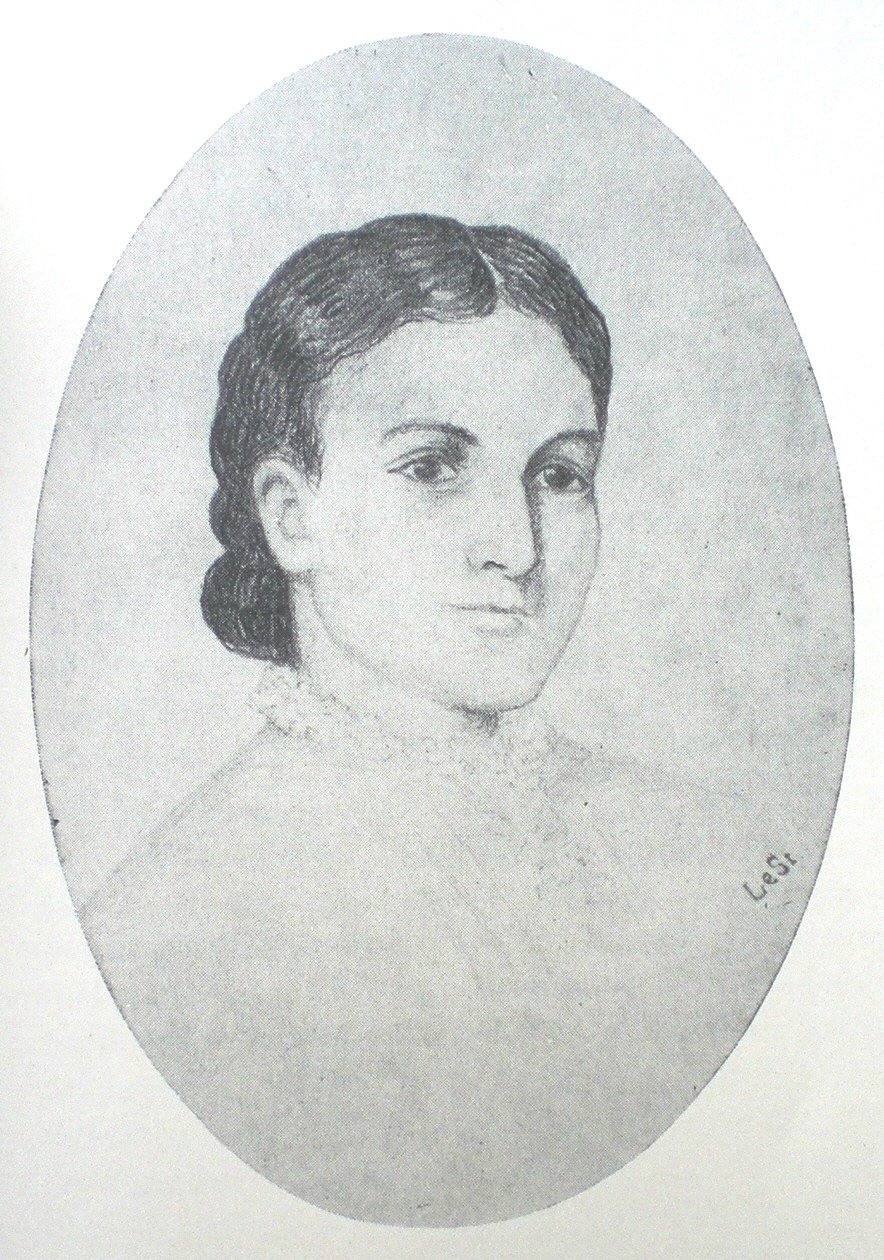
Luisa Isabel Pachano Muñoz

== See also ==
- Ezequiel Zamora
- Federal War
- Battle of Santa Inés
- Presidents of Venezuela
- List of Venezuelans

Political offices
Preceded by José Antonio Páez	President of Venezuela; 1863-1868	Succeeded by Manuel Ezequiel Bruzual
