= Interim government of Carlos Soublette =

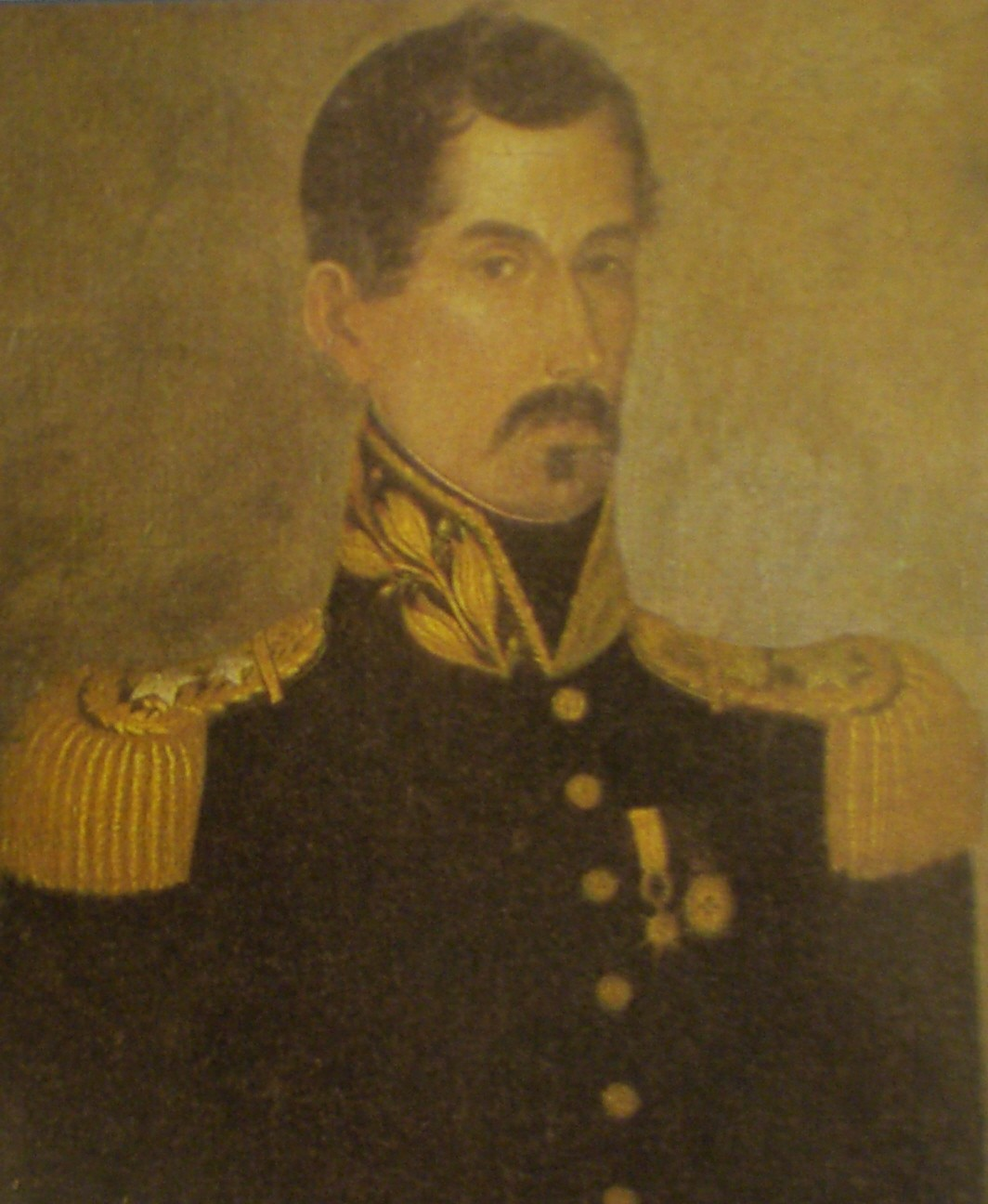
Carlos Soublette

The interim government of Carlos Soublette was the first government of Soublette, who was appointed by the National Congress to finish the presidential term of José María Vargas after his resignation in 1836. Soublette assumed office in 1837 and served until 1839.

== Background ==
The last elected president had been José María Vargas, who resigned amid the difficult internal situation of the post‑independence period. Andrés Narvarte and José María Carreño served as interim presidents until the National Congress designated Carlos Soublette as Vice President and acting President after he won the election with 52 votes.

Soublette, for his part, had been a minister of Simón Bolívar when the country was part of Gran Colombia and of Páez during the separation from Colombia and the establishment of the State of Venezuela. Soublette, who was in Europe serving as minister plenipotentiary negotiating the Treaty of Independence of Venezuela, Peace and Friendship with Spain, arrived in La Guaira on April 10, 1837, and was invested with his office the following day.

== Cabinet ==
José Antonio Páez helped Soublette form his cabinet; Ramón Yépes and José Luis Ramos were appointed Secretaries of State, Colonel Guillermo Smith as Minister of War and Navy, and Santos Michelena as Minister of Finance and Foreign Affairs, with Páez remaining in charge of the army.

== Domestic policy ==
=== Defense ===
José Antonio Páez, in charge of the army, suppressed the rebellion of Francisco Farfán, one of the pardoned insurgents of the Revolution of the Reforms, who rose up in Apure. Soublette granted a pardon to all the reformists, including some linked to Farfán who had not been part of the uprising, which was received with displeasure by some of his own supporters and those of Vargas's followers, who agreed with the sentences they were serving.

Juan Cordero and Eduardo Figueroa rose up in Cumaná, and Colonel Francisco María Farías rebelled in Maracaibo and Perijá in 1838. All movements were defeated, and Farías was sentenced to death. Between 1837 and 1838, national defense accounted for 45% of the national budget.

=== Judicial policy ===
After executing Colonel Francisco María Farías, the government granted pardons to those who took part in the attempted uprising in the city of Maracaibo led by Farías and to those who rose up in El Vigía in Puerto Cabello that same year.

=== Economics ===
At that time, most commercial exchanges were barter. In 1837, an economic crisis began in the United States that had a negative impact on Venezuela.

=== Immigration ===
In May 1837, the government enacted a law to promote European immigration, previously legislated only in favor of Canary Islanders. Companies were urged to promote and carry out the processes of immigration and colonization.

== Foreign policy ==
During this time, Venezuela maintained diplomatic relations with Ecuador, Peru, Bolivia, New Granada, and Chile, as well as a navigation treaty with the United States and treaties of friendship and commerce with the Netherlands, France, Denmark, and the Hanseatic Cities, as well as with the United Kingdom, with whom there were border disputes concerning Esequibo.

== See also ==
- Second presidency of Carlos Soublette
- Presidency of José María Vargas
- Second presidency of José Antonio Páez
