= Expulsion of the Spaniards from Gran Colombia =

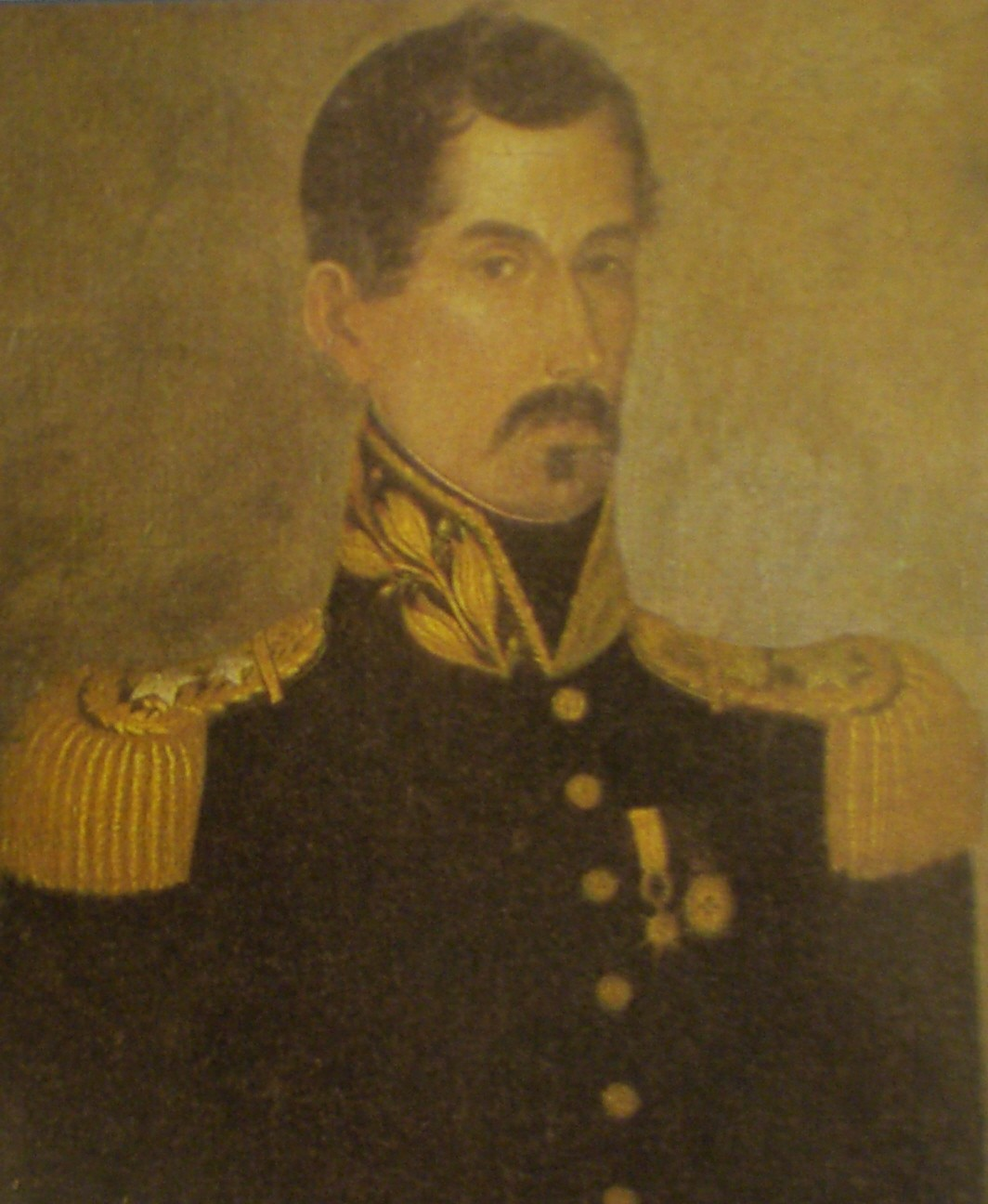
Carlos Soublette decreed the expulsion law in a context of high political polarization

The expulsion of the Spaniards from Gran Colombia was a forced emigration law for the Spanish civilian population residing in Gran Colombia after the conclusion of the War of Independence, decreed by the Venezuelan regional vice president Carlos Soublette.

== Background ==
The campaign undertaken by the independentist revolutionaries of 1819 allowed the creation of a political and military apparatus that enabled the possibility of expelling the Spaniards, in a context of war to the death decreed by Simón Bolívar in 1813 where, according to Bolívar, "all European and Canarian Spaniards were almost without exception executed by firing squad."

== History ==
After the war ended, Vice President Carlos Soublette issued a decree ordering the expulsion from Colombian territory of all Spaniards (peninsular and Canarian) who could not prove that they had formed part of the independentist movement, with the exception of elderly persons over 80 years of age and employees of the army. José Antonio Páez, who aspired to achieve a negotiated solution to the post-independence conflict, mediated to undo the decree, as the republic had not yet taken control of the city of Puerto Cabello.

Because of this, the Government Council in Bogotá debated what to do about it, aware that it was not convenient to revoke it because it would show weakness on the part of the nascent republican government. It was then clarified that the law excepted those who had performed invaluable services for the Republic or whose work and decision for the emancipatory cause were recognized. The Secretary of War and the regional vice president Francisco de Paula Santander opposed its repeal, arguing that the Spaniards were the cause of the uprisings that had occurred in Pasto, Ciénaga, Ocaña, Zulia, and the savannahs west of Cartagena. They agreed to ask Páez to propose concessions in the negotiation process with the Spaniards in Puerto Cabello without the repeal of the law being one of them. The main destination where the exiled Spaniards arrived was Puerto Rico, where there is a record of the reception of 3,555 refugees.
