= DOMREP =

United Nations peacekeeping organization

Mission of the Representative of the Secretary-General in the Dominican Republic

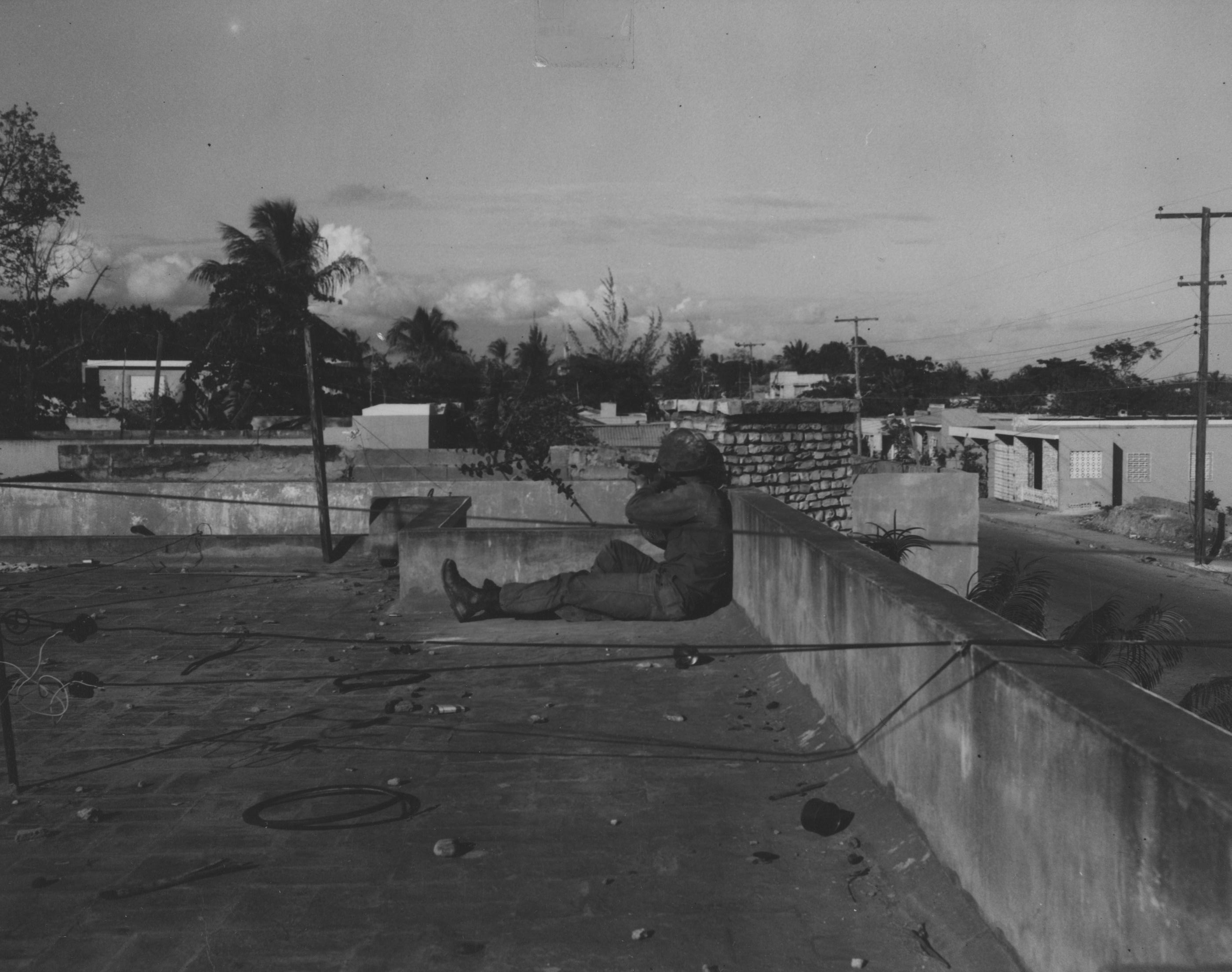
- A Marine sniper monitors the international neutral corridor from a rooftop in Santo Domingo.
- Abbreviation: DOMREP
- Formation: 1965
- Type: Peacekeeping force
- Legal status: Completed
- Purpose: Observe the ceasefire agreement
- Headquarters: Santo Domingo
- Location: Dominican Republic
- Secretary General: U Thant
- Head of Mission: José Antonio Mayobre
- Military advisor: Indar Jit Rikhye
- Parent organization: Department of Peacekeeping Operations
- Expenses: $275,831
- Staff: 4 including up to 2 military observers from Brazil, Canada and Ecuador.
- Website: https://peacekeeping.un.org/en/mission/domrep/

The Mission of the Representative of the Secretary-General in the Dominican Republic (DOMREP) was a peacekeeping operation established in 1965 by the UN to observe the ceasefire agreement between the two de facto authorities in the Dominican Republic during the Dominican Civil War. DOMREP was instructed to report any breaches of the agreements between the Constitutionalists led by Juan Bosch and Francisco Caamaño, and Loyalists commanded by Elías Wessin y Wessin and backed by the United States. Once the new Dominican constitutional government was formed, DOMREP withdrew.

Following the outbreak of civil war three weeks prior in the country, and the subsequent intervention of the United States – under the codename Operation Power Pack –, the United Nations Security Council organized DOMREP to oversee a ceasefire and free elections in the Dominican Republic. The Secretary-General of the United Nations U Thant appointed Mr José Antonio Mayobre to oversee the mission until completion. The UN DOMREP mission was significant because it marked the only peacekeeping mission to occur in the Western Hemisphere and in the sphere of American influence in the Cold War era. General elections were held on 1 June 1966, resulting in victory for Joaquín Balaguer, and initiating the withdrawal of the peacekeeping operations in September 1966.

== Background ==
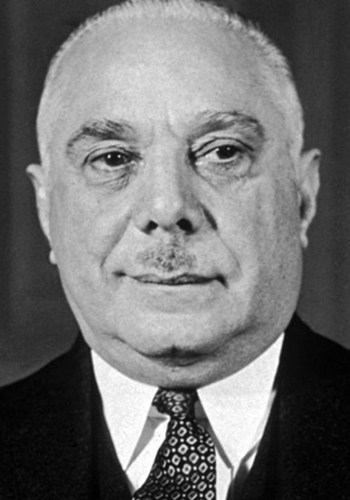
Rafael Trujillo imposed a severe dictatorship over the Dominican Republic for more than 30 years (1930–1961)

=== Under Trujillo's rule ===
The Dominican Republic has been successively colonized by the Spanish, the French, the Haitians and the British since the 15th century, though temporarily gaining independence in the late 19th century. Following the establishment of the Monroe Doctrine in 1823, the United States had directly or indirectly intervened in the politics, economy and society of Latin America, seeking to place the entire continent under its own sphere of influence by supporting puppet regimes. Since 1930, the Dominican Republic had been under the dictatorship of Rafael Trujillo and his family, who were backed by the U.S to control Dominica politically and economically. Trujillo's dictatorship isolated the Dominican Republic both financially and diplomatically, with efforts of state-sponsored terrorism angering the Republic's Latin American neighbours. Following Trujillo's attempted assassination of the US-Backed Venezuelan President Rómulo Betancourt, the Eisenhower Administration approved a CIA-Backed assassination of Trujillo by various Dominican business leaders and military officers on 30 May 1961. Trujillo's family failed to maintain control of the country, and fled following the Rebellion of the Pilots on 19 November 1961.

=== Elections and first coup ===
In 1962, long-time Dominican opposition leader, Juan Emilio Bosch Gaviño won the first free election in the Republic's history. Bosch's government pursued an agenda of civilian control of the military, a secular constitution and widespread popular land reforms. This agenda angered both the Dominican Military and Dominican landholders, ending Bosch's government in a Coup d'état on 25 September 1963. From December 1963 to April 1965, the Dominican Republic became a military junta under a triumvirate led by Donald Reid Cabral.

=== Counter-coup and Civil War ===
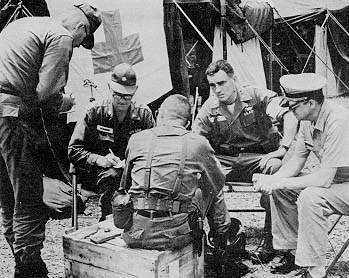
Medical Service officers of the American army conferring near Santo Domingo in early May 1965.

By 1965, however, discontentment following failed reform at stabilizing the country led to a military counter-coup (headed by Francisco Caamaño) to removed the junta from power. Loyalists towards Reid, led by General Elías Wessin y Wessin attempted a second counter-coup, beginning the Dominican Civil War. On the advice of the US ambassador to the Dominican Republic, William Tapley Bennett Jr., who urged that the U.S should act before an international coalition ever had the time to form, US President Lyndon B. Johnson organized Operation Power Pack, allowing the occupation of the country under the Organization of American States (OAS) by the mobilized Inter-American Peace Force (IAPF).

== Operation ==
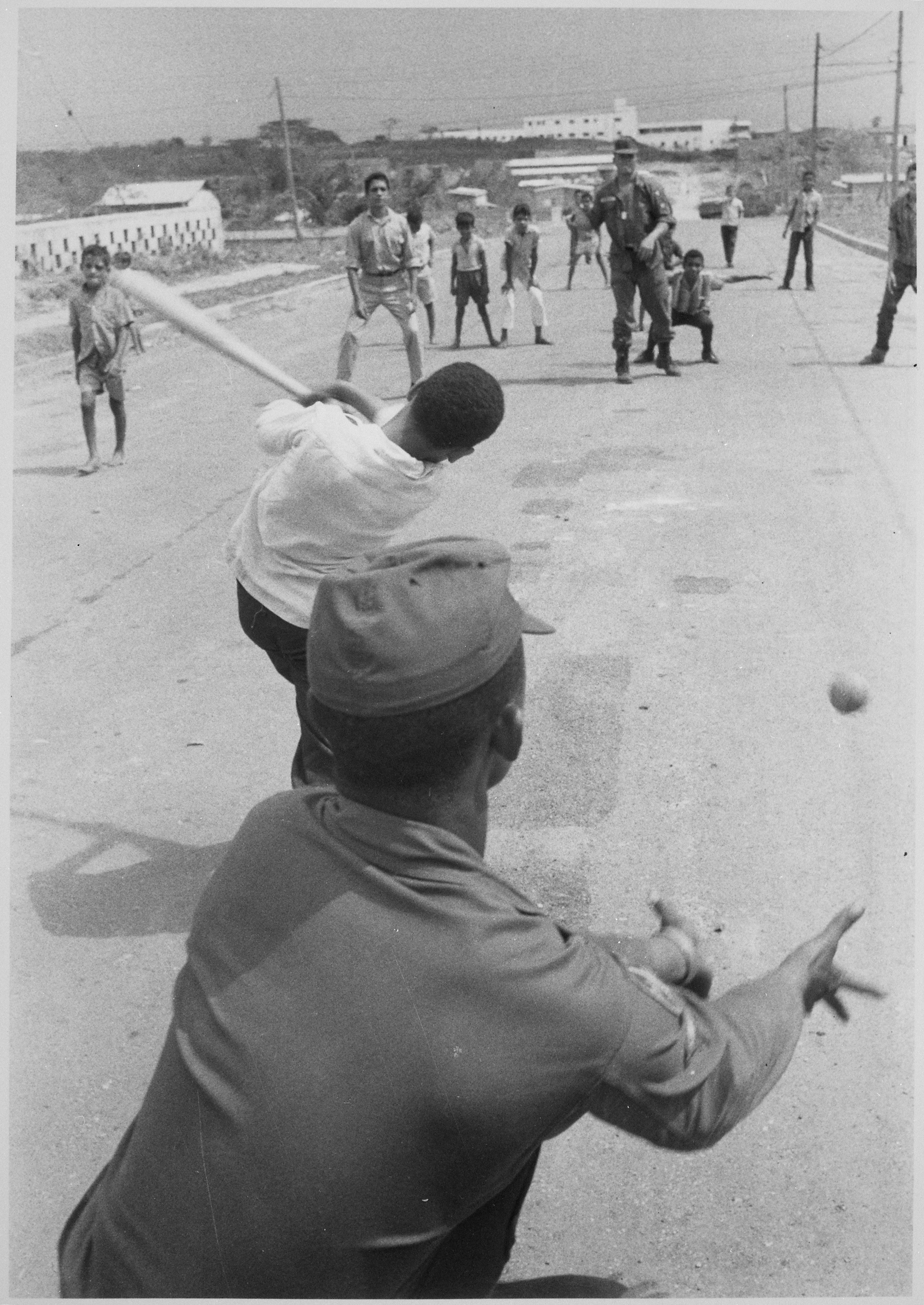
American G.I.s playing baseball with Dominican kid while the DOMREP is being discussed in the UN.

DOMREP was formed both to help broker the ceasefire between the Constitutionalists and Loyalists, as well as to act as a balance against US influence in the Republic under the OAS. Initial US intervention had witnessed strong opposition from neighbouring Latin American states, along with France and the Soviet Union. The latter claimed that the OAS Force was the usage of an International Organization to legitimize American imperialism. The Soviet Union led efforts through the Security Council on 1 May 1965 to authorize DOMREP. The Mission called for and observed a ceasefire between the Constitutionalist and Loyalist factions of the Dominican military.

DOMREP was authorized on 14 May 1965, however, the UN lacked 'boots on the ground'. The UN Peacekeeping Mission had no real troops assigned to guarantee the ceasefire compliance, counting only with a small team of observers from Brazil, Canada, and Ecuador. Instead, the UN gave the OAS responsibility of providing the military force. Country members of the OAS organized a task force of 12,400 US personnel and 1,763 soldiers from various Latin American countries.

UN Security Council Resolutions 203 and 205 placed the country under Security Council observation, and requested the OAS to inform the UN of its actions within the Dominican Republic. Venezuelan Executive Secretary José Antonio Mayobre acted as the representative of the UN Secretary-General, accompanied by the Indian Major-General Indar Jit Rikhye as a military advisor. The mission faced early criticism. Dominican Foreign Minister Horacio Vicioso Soto complained that DOMREP did not allow the Dominican Republic police to act in a sovereign manner in the conflict zone, bringing criticism of UN and OAS violation of the Dominican Republic's status as an independent state.

DOMREP involvement came to an end following the signing of the Act of Dominican Reconciliation on 31 August 1965, led by the OAS. The act agreed on free elections throughout the country to end the conflict. The elections saw the victory of President Joaquín Balaguer against Bosch. The last troops of both the OAS-led IAPF and UN-led DOMREP withdrew on 21 September 1966.

=== Personnel in action ===
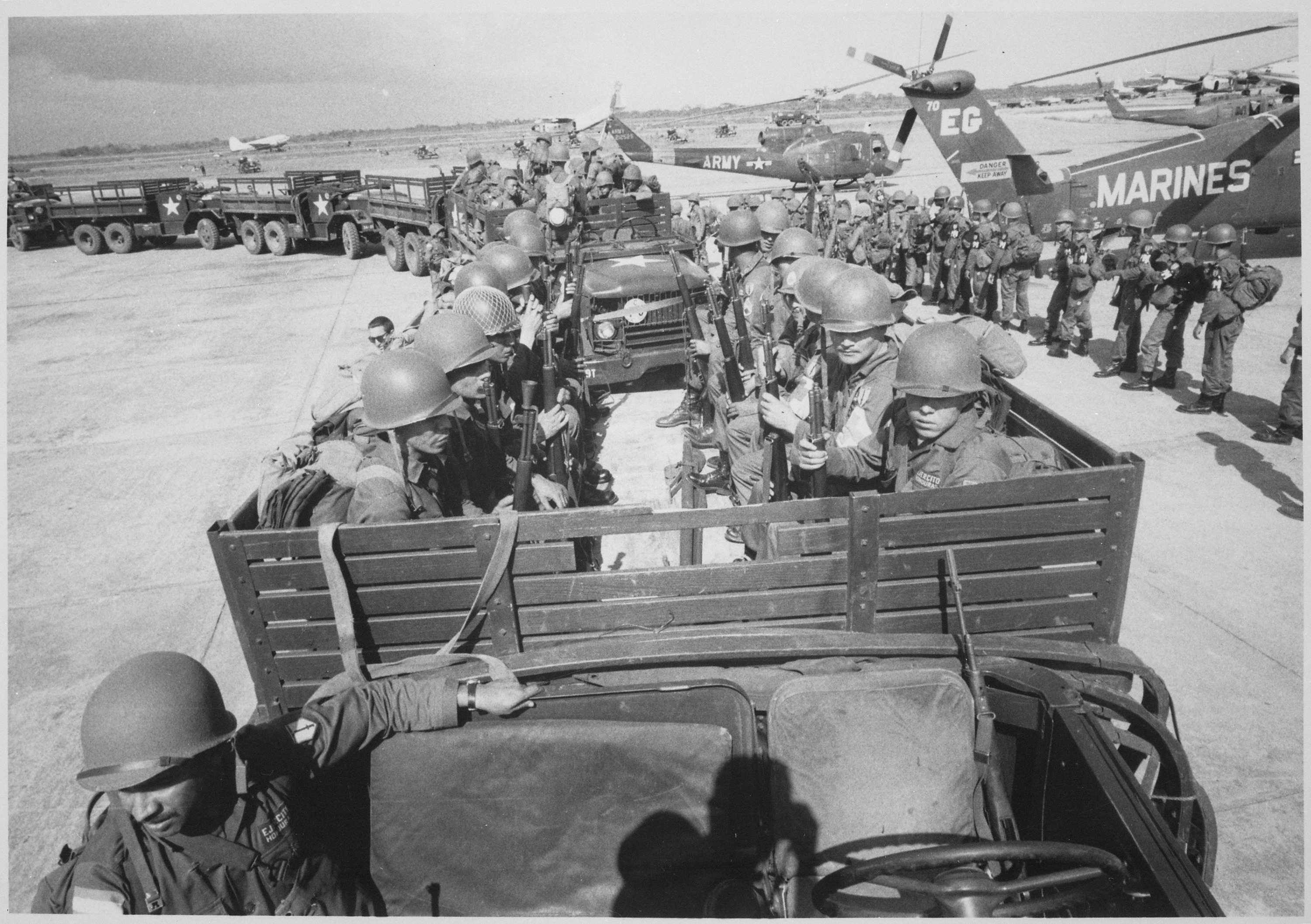
Honduran soldiers were the first troops to arrive and assume peacekeeping duties in the Dominican Republic.

IAPF Forces:
Country	Number of Soldiers	Special Represesentative
United States	12,400	Lieutenant-General Bruce Palmer Jr.
Brazil	1.152	General Hugo Panasco Alvim
Honduras	250	
Paraguay	178	
Nicaragua	159	
Costa Rica	21 Military police	
El Salvador	3 Officers	

== Reactions ==
The United States had presented their mission as fait accompli (accomplished fact), and were also aware that DOMREP was acting as an observer mission with no peace-keeping forces assigned. The United States, therefore, did not raise its concerns about DOMREP in the United Nations, although there was a lack of a proper working relationship between the DOMREP mission and the OAS mission, contributing to long drawn-out violations with regard to human rights in addition to the ceasefire. The mission, although relatively small, had been one of considerable complexity, specifically regarding the unilateral role of the United States and the later role of the IAPF. Despite this, the United Nations also benefited from the presence of the regional organization in the Dominican Republic, by not having to allocate financial resources for a military presence as well as maintaining a legal precedent over all operations in the country. They were further benefited by the reception of Dominican authorities who recognised the UN's commitment to achieving peace and harmony in the region while also repudiating the IAPF in letters that voice strong criticism of their role.

== Legacy ==
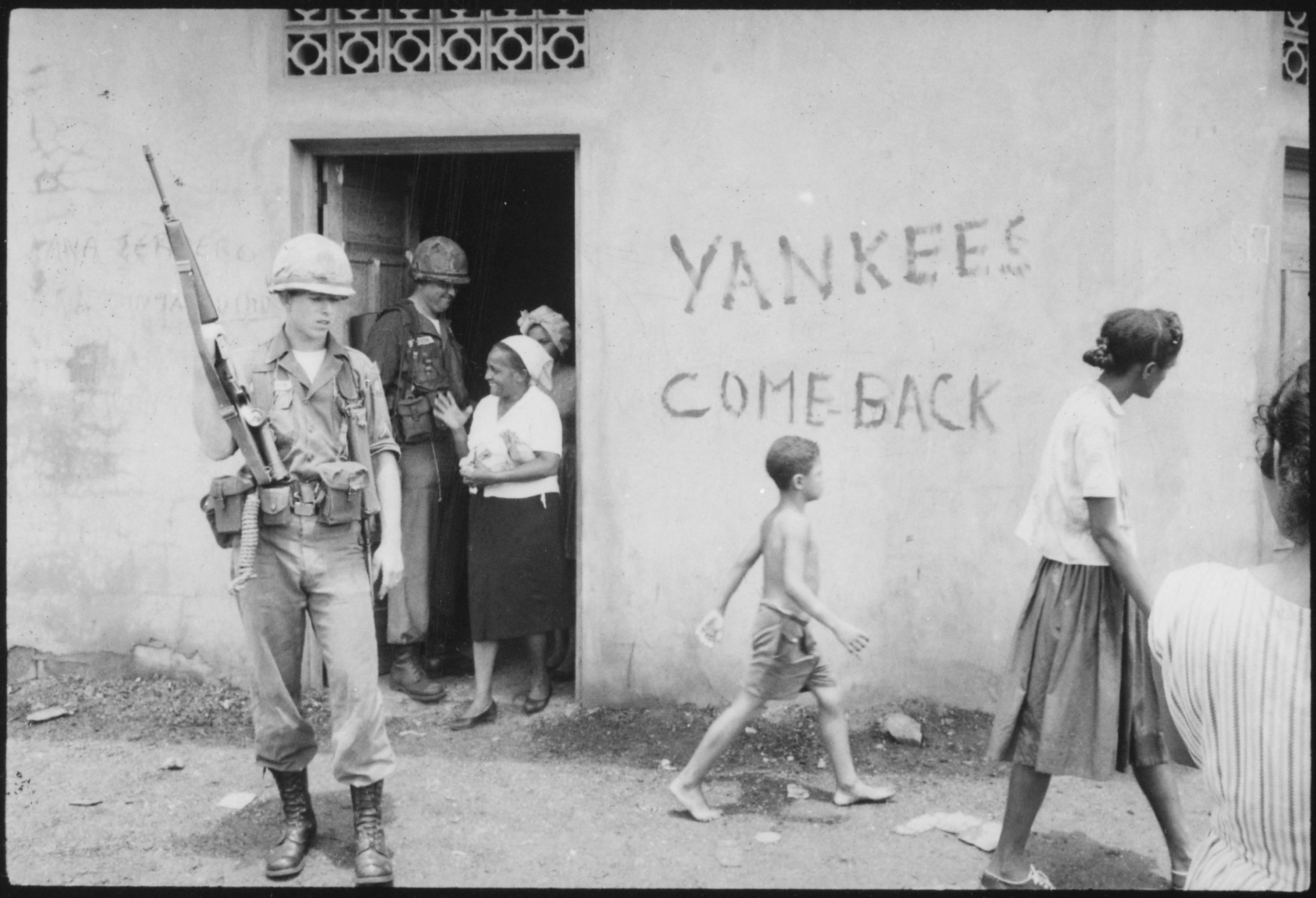
Food distribution centre in Santo Domingo.

Bernardo Rodrigues dos Santos argues that DOMREP could be viewed as a success from the perspective of having successfully completed its Security Council Mandate. Unlike many of the preceding UN peacekeeping missions, DOMREP was engaged in a mission taking place in the military presence of one of the Cold War powers at the time, without having UN military personnel on the ground. Even though not expressly against the rules of the UN Charter, the United States had initially sent a military intervention without the authorization of the Security Council, which was required in such a circumstance. DOMREP also marked the first occasion in which a UN Peacekeeping Mission was confronted with operating alongside another regional organization pursuing the same objective – in this case the OAS. By checking the power of the United States in their own geopolitical sphere of influence, the mission overall was argued to be a relatively successful attempt of the UN in dealing with unilateral interventionism by one of its own Security Council Permanent Members.

DOMREP has been argued as both a means of US legitimization of their earlier intervention under the OAS, and as a Soviet response to limit US influence in the Dominican Republic.
