= Ministry of Economy and Finance (Venezuela) =

Government ministry of Venezuela

- Ministerio del Poder Popular de Economía y Finanzas
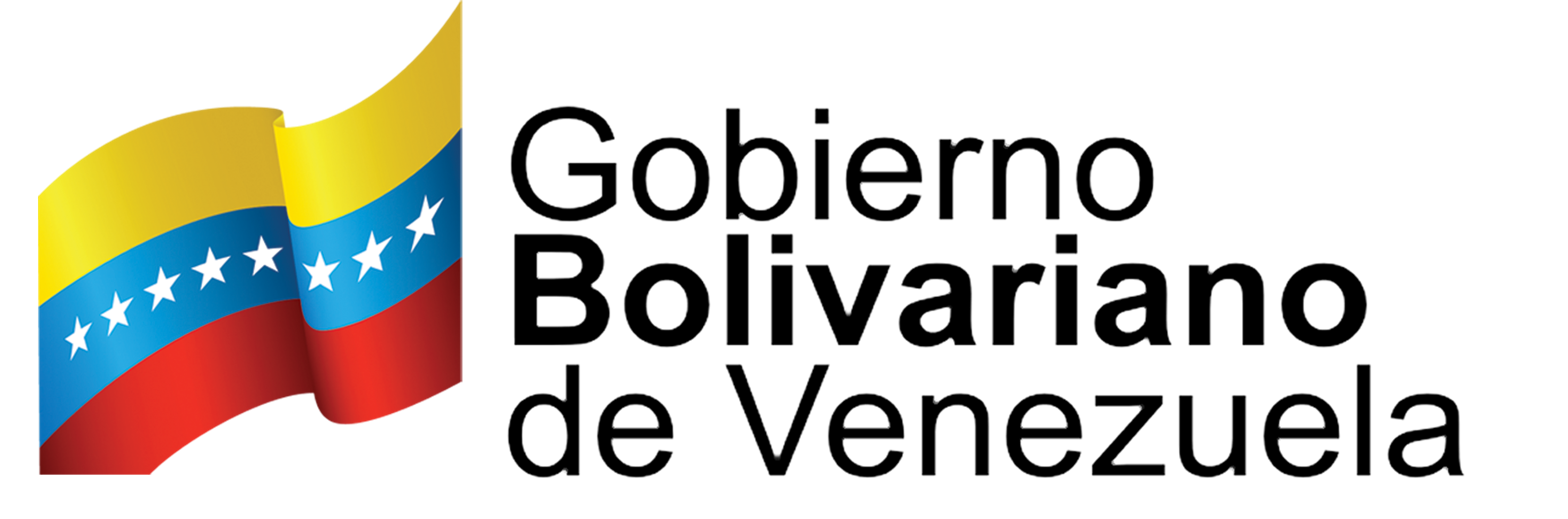

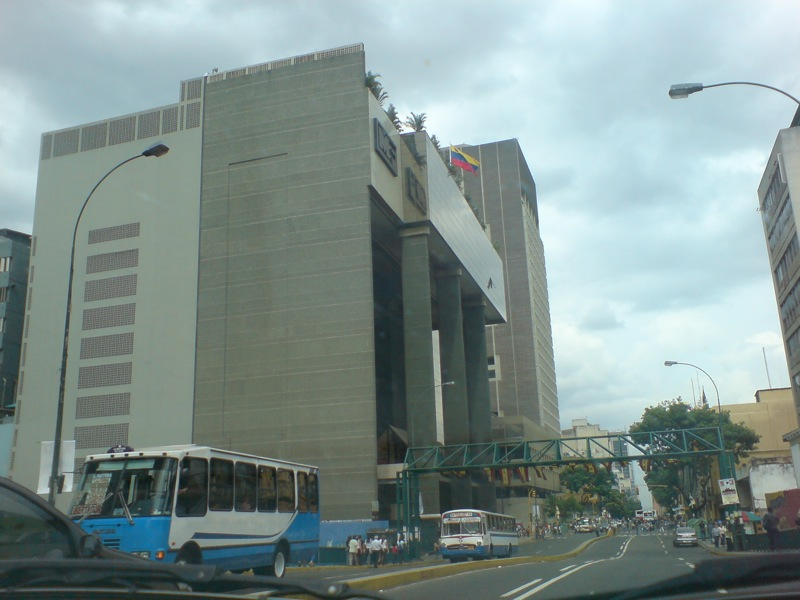
- Ministry of Economy and Finance, Avenida Urdaneta, Caracas

Taxation and budgeting agency overview
- Formed: 1819
- Jurisdiction: Government of Venezuela
- Headquarters: Caracas
- Parent department: Government of Venezuela
- Website: www.mppef.gob.ve

The Ministry of Economy and Finance (Ministerio del Poder Popular de Economía y Finanzas, in Spanish, literally, "Ministry of People's Power for the Economy and Finance") is a ministry of the government of Venezuela with similar portfolios dating back to 1810 with the creation of a tax office. When Gran Colombia was dissolved and Venezuela assumed its independence, the Ministry of Finance was created in 1830 when General José Antonio Páez commissioned the establishment of the public business office to three Secretariats of State: Interior, Justice and Police, War and Navy, Finance, and Foreign Relations.

== Ministers of Finance when part Gran Colombia ==
- Manuel Palacios Fajardo, 1819
- Pedro Gual Escandón, 1819-1821
- Luis Eduardo Azuela, 1821
- José María del Castillo y Rada, 1821-1828
- Nicolas M. Tanco, 1828-1829
- José Ignacio de Márquez, 1830
- Gerónimo Mendoza, 1830

== Ministers of Finance of Venezuela ==
- Diego Bautista Urbaneja, 1830
- Santos Michelena, 1830-1833
- Pedro Pablo Díaz, 1833-1834
- Santos Michelena, 1834-1835
- José Luis Ramos, 1835
- José E. Gallegos, 1835-1836
- Santos Michelena, 1837
- José Félix Blanco, 1847
- Fermín Toro, 1847
- Diego Antonio Caballero, 1848-1849
- Ramón Yépez, 1849
- José Rafael Revenga, 1849
- Jacinto Gutiérrez Martínez, 1849
- Francisco Olavarría, 1849-1850
- Manuel Machín Quintero, 1850
- Vicente Lecuna, 1850
- José María de Heres, 1850
- Esteban Ibarra, 1850-1851
- Francisco Aranda, 1851
- Pedro Carlos Gellineau, 1851-1852
- José del Carmen Betancourt, 1852
- Pio Ceballos, 1853-1855
- Jacinto Gutiérrez Martínez, 1855-1857
- Rafael Arvelo, 1858
- Fermín Toro, 1858
- Miguel Herrera, 1858-1859
- Pedro de las Casas, 1859
- Manuel M. Echendia, 1859
- Eduardo Calcaño, 1859
- Manuel Cadenas Delgado, 1859
- Luis Irribarren, 1860
- Eduardo Calcaño, 1860
- Enrique Pérez Velazco, 1860
- Manuel Cadenas Delgado, 1860-1861
- Manuel Antonio Carreño, 1861
- Francisco Madriz, 1861
- Hilarión Nadal, 1861
- Pedro José Rojas, 1862-1863
- Antonio Guzmán Blanco, 1863-1864
- Guillermo Iribarren, 1864
- Octaviano Urdaneta, 1864
- Santiago Goiticoa, 1864
- José D. Landaeta, 1865-1866
- Rafael Arvelo, 1866
- J. M. Álvarez de Lugo, 1866
- Lucio Pulido, 1867
- Nicolas Gutiérrez, 1867
- Carlos Engelke, 1868
- Antonio Guzmán Blanco, 1868
- Wenceslao Urrutia, 1868
- Marcos Santana, 1868-1869
- Eduardo Calcaño, 1869
- Rafael Martínez, 1869
- Ramón Francia, 1869
- Ramón Azpúrua, 1869-1870
- Sixto Sánchez, 1870
- Juan Francisco Galindo, 1870
- Miguel Aristeguieta, 1870
- Jacinto Gutiérrez, 1870-1872
- Santiago Goiticoa, 1872-1873
- Vicente Coronado, 1873-1874
- Santiago Goiticoa, 1874-1875
- Vicente Coronado, 1875-1876
- Pedro Toledo Bermúdez, 1876-1877
- Adolfo Urdaneta, 1877
- Juan Bautista Vidal, 1877
- Raimundo Andueza Palacio, 1877-1878
- Trinidad Celis Ávila, 1878
- Joaquin Díaz, 1878
- Modesto Urbaneja, 1879
- José Antonio Zapata, 1879
- Fernando Adames, 1879
- Ildefonso Riera Aguinagalde, 1879
- Diego Jugo Ramírez, 1879
- Juan Pablo Rojas Paúl, 1879-1884
- Francisco Rivas Castillo, 1884-1886
- Juan Francisco Castillo, 1886
- Andrés María Caballero, 1886
- Pedro Pablo Azpúrua Huizi, 1886-1887
- Fulgencio M. Carias, 1887
- Juan Pablo Rojas Paúl, 1887
- Pedro Ramos, 1888
- Vicente Coronado, 1888
- Julio S. García, 1888-1889
- José María Lares, 1889-1890
- Vicente Coronado, 1890-1891
- Santos Escobar, 1892
- Manuel Antonio Matos, 1892
- Lorenzo Adrián Arreaza, 1892
- Silvestre Pacheco Jurado, 1892
- Juan Pietri Pietri, 1892-1893
- José Antonio Velutini, 1893
- Fabricio Conde, 1893-1895
- Enrique Pérez B., 1895
- Manuel Antonio Matos, 1895
- Andrés María Caballero, 1895
- Enrique Pérez B., 1895-1896
- Claudio Bruzual Serra, 1896-1897
- Andrés María Caballero, 1897
- Luis A. Castillo, 1897
- Andrés María Caballero, 1897
- Jorge Uslar, 1897
- Santos Escobar, 1897-1898
- Manuel Antonio Matos, 1898
- Santos Escobar, 1898-1899
- José Antonio Olavarría, 1899
- Santos Escobar, 1899
- Juan Pablo Rojas Paúl, 1899
- Ramón Tello Mendoza, 1899-1903
- José Cecilio De Castro, 1903-1906
- Gustavo J. Sanabria, 1906
- Eduardo Celis, 1906-1907
- Ricardo Álvarez de Lugo, 1907
- Arnaldo Morales, 1907-1908
- Jesus Munoz Tebar, 1908-1909
- Juan José Herrera Toro, 1909
- Abel Santos, 1909-1910
- Manuel Porras Echenagucia, 1910
- Antonio Pimentel, 1910-1912
- Manuel Porras Echenagucia, 1912
- Román Cárdenas, 1913-1922
- Melchor Centeno Grau, 1922-1929
- Rafael María Velasco, 1929-1930
- José María García, 1930-1931
- Efraín González, 1931-1936
- Gustavo Herrera, 1936
- Alejandro Lara, 1936
- Alberto Adriani, 1936
- Atilano Carnevali, 1936-1937
- Cristóbal L. Mendoza, 1937-1938
- Francisco Parra, 1938-1941
- Alfredo Machado Hernández, 1941-1943
- Arturo Uslar Pietri, 1943
- Rodolfo Rojas, 1943-1945
- Alfonso Espinoza, 1945
- Carlos D'Ascoli, 1945-1947
- Manuel Pérez Guerrero, 1947-1948
- Aurelio Arreaza Arreaza, 1948-1953
- Pedro Guzmán Rivera, 1953-1958
- José Antonio Giacopini Zárraga, 1958
- Arturo Sosa, 1958
- José Antonio Mayobre, 1958-1960
- Tomás Enrique Carrillo Batalla, 1960-1961
- Andrés Germán Otero, 1961-1965
- Eddie Morales Crespo, 1965-1967
- Benito Raúl Losada, 1967-1968
- Francisco Mendoza, junior, 1968-1969
- Pedro Tinoco, 1969-1972
- Luis Enrique Oberto, 1972-1974
- Héctor Hurtado Navarro, 1974-1977
- Luis José Silva Luongo, 1977-1979
- Luis Ugueto Arismendi, 1979-1983
- Arturo Sosa, 1982-1984
- Manuel Azpúrua Arreaza, 1984-1987
- Héctor Hurtado Navarro, 1988-1989
- Eglé Iturbe de Blanco, 1989-1990
- Roberto Pocaterra Silva, 1990-1992
- Pedro Rosas Bravo, 1992-1993
- Carlos Rafael Silva, 1993-1994
- Julio Sosa Rodríguez, 1994-1995
- Luis Raúl Matos Azócar, 1995-1997
- Freddy Rojas Parra, 1997-1998
- Maritza Izaguirre, 1998-1999
- José Alejandro Rojas, 1999-2000
- Nelson Merentes, 2001-2002
- Francisco Usón, 2002
- Tobías Nóbrega, 2002-2004
- Nelson Merentes, 2004-2007
- Rodrigo Cabeza Morales, 2007-2008
- Rafael Isea, 2008
- Alí Rodríguez Araque, 2008-2010
- Jorge Giordani, 2010-2013
- Nelson Merentes, 2013-2014
- Rodolfo Clemente Marco Torres, 2014-2016
- Rodolfo Medina del Río, 2016-2017
- Ramón Augusto Lobo Moreno, 2017
- Simón Zerpa, 2017-2020
- Delcy Rodríguez, 2020-2024
- Anabel Pereira Fernández, 2024-2025
- Anabel Pereira Fernández, 2025

== See also ==
- Economy of Venezuela
