= Barbarita Nieves =

Mistress of José Antonio Páez

- Born: Bárbara Nieves; 1803; Apure plains, Captaincy General of Venezuela, Spanish Empire
- Died: 14 December 1847; Maracay, Venezuela
- Partner(s): José Antonio Páez (1821–1847, her death)
- Children: 2

Barbarita Nieves (1803–14 December 1847) was the mistress of José Antonio Páez, during his time as Commandant General of the Gran Colombia Department of Venezuela and then his first two periods as President of Venezuela. Their life together began in 1821, the year he separated from his wife, Dominga Ortiz.

== Early life ==
Nieves was born in 1803 on the plains of Apure in Venezuela Province, then part of the Captaincy General of Venezuela.

== Mistress ==
Nieves introduced culture to Paez's life, prompting him to learn other languages and supporting theater and painting. According to José Antonio Calcaño, she was one of the motivations for Paez to begin reading the works of Alphonse de Lamartine, Jean-Jacques Rousseau and Miguel de Cervantes. For more than 25 years, the couple lived between Valencia, Maracay and Caracas. They had two daughters, Úrsula and Juana De Dios. The British diplomat Robert Ker Porter was a frequent visitor of La Viñeta, where the family resided. In his diary, he speaks of the house meetings, with music and where the daughters danced for visitors.

She died in Maracay on 14 December 1847. Nieves sickened in a critical moment for Páez, who had distanced himself from then President José Tadeo Monagas and was getting ready to confront him. Her death dramatically affected Páez, who referred to "the emptiness that her eternal absence has left" in a letter to his friend Carlos Arvelo.
