= Barquisimeto rebellion =

Military uprising in Venezuela

- Part of the Venezuelan civil wars
Date	1853–1854
Location	Venezuela
Result	Liberal Government victory Liberal government expands the army to 10,000 soldiers

Belligerents
Conservative rebels	Liberal Government

Commanders and leaders
Juan Bautista Rodríguez	José Gregorio Monagas

Strength
3,000 soldiers	10,000 soldiers

The Barquisimeto rebellion began with an uprising of conservatives in Cumaná, Venezuela in August 1853 demanding the return of José Antonio Páez. The rebellion was quickly defeated by the government, which increased the size of its army to ten thousand men.

== Outcome ==
A mutiny of 3000 men broke out in Barquisimeto on 12 July 1854 under the command of Juan Bautista Rodríguez. He divided them into three battalions for a combined offensive inland.
Fifteen days later, Rodríguez and 1,700 soldiers were defeated near his city by 2,500 government troops. On 28 July 1,000 rebels led by Antonio José Vásquez surrendered. The third battalion dissolved in the Portuguesa state into guerrilla bands. A new rebellion of 150 soldiers broke out on 31 July in the same city, but by mid-August, they had surrendered.

Juan Bautista Rodríguez was defeated by the Government at Chaparral and was arrested in Quíbor on 13 August 1854. He was executed the next day in Laguna de la Piedra, a place near Barquisimeto.

== See also ==
- Venezuelan civil war of 1848–1849
