= José Luis Ramos =

Venezuelan writer and politician

Minister of Foreign Affairs of Venezuela
- In office 8 June 1833 – 15 October 1833
- President: Andrés Narvarte
- In office 20 January 1835 – 29 March 1835
- President: José María Vargas
- In office 15 January 1837 – 20 January 1837
- President: José María Vargas
- In office 13 March 1837 – 12 April 1837
- President: Carlos Soublette

Personal details
- Born: c. 1790 Caracas, Venezuela
- Died: May 7, 1849 Maiquetia, Venezuela
- Occupation: Politician, writer

José Luis Ramos (c. 1790 – May 7, 1849) was a Venezuelan writer and political figure. Ramos served various government roles such as Minister of Foreign Affairs of Venezuela multiple times. He was the Minister of Finance in 1835. He edited the literary magazine La Guirnalda between 1839 and 1850. He is considered the founder of literary journalism in Venezuela. Born in Caracas, he died in Maiguetia.

He was editor of La Guirnalda as of 1839 out of Caracas, which was the first literary magazine in the country, publishing poets such as Rafael María Baralt.

== See also ==
- List of ministers of foreign affairs of Venezuela

Political offices
Preceded by Santos Michelena	5th Minister of Foreign Affairs of Venezuela; 8 June 1833 – 15 October 1833	Succeeded by Pedro Pablo Díaz
Preceded by Pedro Pablo Díaz	7th Minister of Foreign Affairs of Venezuela; 20 January 1835 – 29 March 1835	Succeeded by Santos Michelena
Preceded by José Eusebio Gallegos	10th Minister of Foreign Affairs of Venezuela; 15 January 1837 – 20 January 1837	Succeeded by Manuel Echeandía
Preceded by Manuel Echeandía	12th Minister of Foreign Affairs of Venezuela; 13 March 1837 – 12 April 1837	Succeeded by Santos Michelena
