= Second presidency of Carlos Soublette =

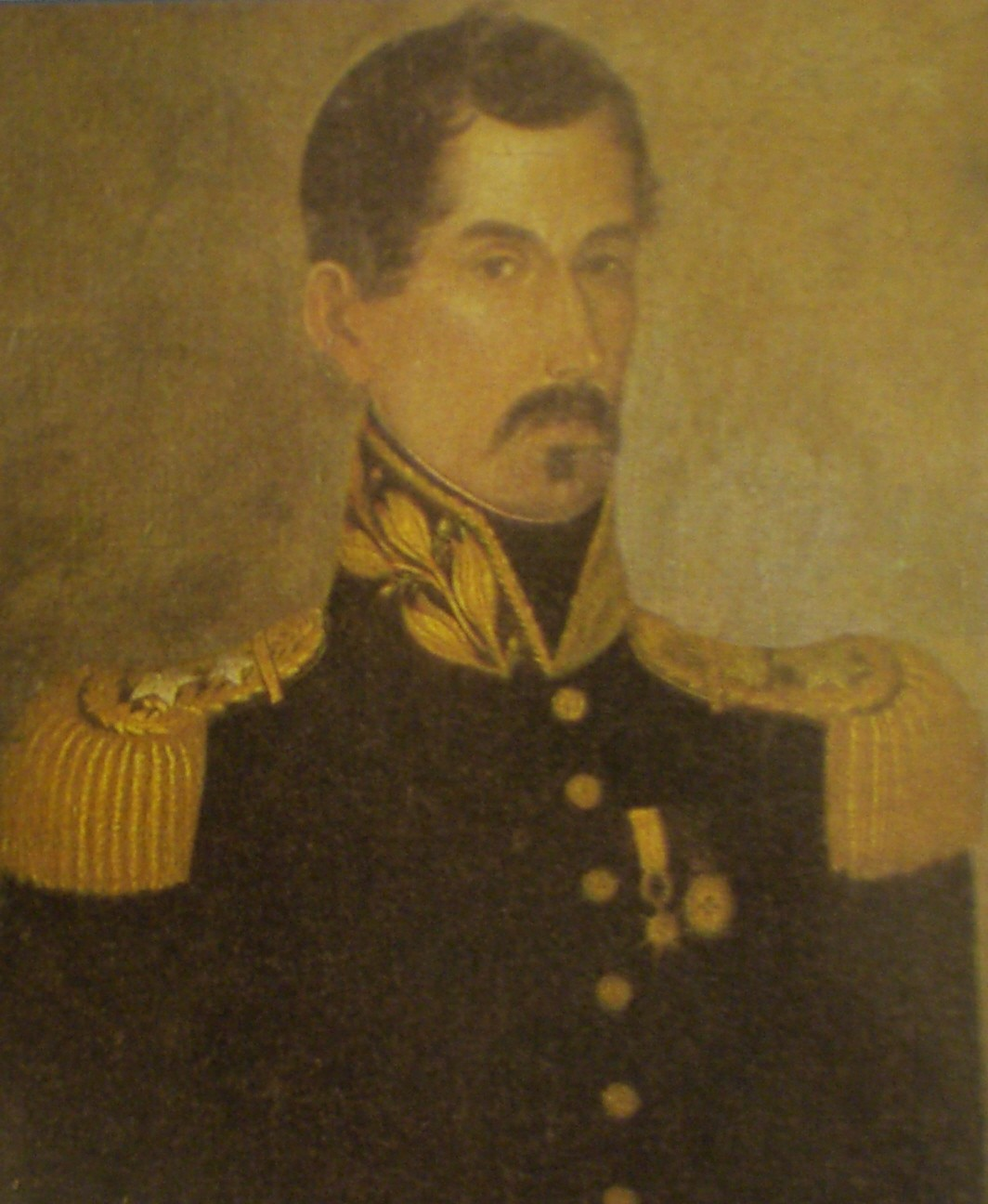
Carlos Soublette

The second presidency of Carlos Soublette was elected through indirect elections by the National Congress. It was Soublette's last presidential term, and he handed over power to Diego Bautista Urbaneja in 1847.

== Background ==
Carlos Soublette had been acting president of the republic by appointment of the National Congress between 1837 and 1839. He ran for election, this time as president, defeating Santos Michelena and Diego Bautista Urbaneja. Soublette assumed office on January 24, 1843, continuing the influence of the Conservative Party in national politics.

== Cabinet ==
Juan Manuel Manrique and Francisco Cobos Fuertes were his ministers of Interior and Justice, Rafael Urdaneta and Francisco Hernáiz his ministers of War and Navy, while Francisco Aranda, Juan Manuel Manrique and Pedro de las Casas were ministers of Finance and Foreign Affairs. In 1844, Fermín Toro was appointed minister plenipotentiary.

== Domestic policy ==
=== Legislative policy ===
At the beginning of his term, Soublette decreed a pardon for all persons who had risen up between 1830 and 1836, allowing them to return to the country.

=== Economics ===
During this time, Venezuela mainly exported cocoa and coffee. In 1842, there was an economic crisis in the West that resulted in a drop in world prices for these crops, so the country's revenues were negatively affected that year.

=== Defense ===
Towards the end of his government, forced recruitment was decreed.

=== Infrastructure ===
In 1844, construction began on the La Rotunda prison. In 1845, the Caracas–La Guaira road was inaugurated.

=== Immigration ===
As a continuation of a Páez initiative, Venezuela received in 1843 a ship with 134 German immigrants who founded Colonia Tovar that year. The lands were donated by Manuel Felipe de Tovar by decision of his father.

== Foreign policy ==
The Venezuelan minister plenipotentiary, Fermín Toro, appointed to delimit the border with Colombia, carried out negotiations that did not work, ceasing after one year.

== 1846 Presidential Elections ==
In the 1846 presidential elections, the Conservatives attempted to commit the first electoral fraud in Venezuela's history to prevent the Liberal Party from winning. Ramón Díaz Sánchez wrote about it:

"As the days go by and the primary elections, prelude to the presidential ones, approach, the Minister of the Interior, Cobos Fuertes, will take the crackdown against the liberals to its limits. He will remove members of other Councils with the same drasticness and in some regions will strip adversaries of their voting rights. He will annul their work. He will have them imprisoned. In San Juan de los Morros, the Electoral Board declares the liberals factionalists. In Maracay, their ticket is rejected because its supporters display portraits of Guzmán 'and there they are not going to vote for dolls'. In Villa de Cura, a merchant named Ezequiel Zamora is prevented from casting his vote because he is one of the most enthusiastic Guzmán supporters."

== Opposition ==
=== Liberal Party ===
During Soublette's government, Antonio Leocadio Guzmán of the Liberal Party was emerging as a potential winner; however, he was politically disqualified from holding public office and arrested.

=== Peasant Insurrection of 1846 ===
The 1846 peasant insurrection in Venezuela was a popular and social rebellion that broke out in several agricultural regions of Venezuela in September 1846 and extended until May 1847.

== See also ==
- Interim government of Carlos Soublette
- Second presidency of José Antonio Páez
- Monagato
