= Pocaterra =

Pocaterra is a surname. Notable people with the surname include:

- José Rafael Pocaterra (1889–1955), Venezuelan writer, journalist and politician
- Noelí Pocaterra (born 1936), Venezuelan politician and indigenous rights activist
- Roberto Pocaterra (1941–2016), Venezuelan economist, professor and politician

== See also ==
- Mount Pocaterra, mountain in Alberta, Canada
