= Pedro Rosas Bravo =

Venezuelan politician (1951–2025)

Pedro Antonio Rosas Bravo

Minister of Finance of Venezuela
- In office 1992–1993
- President: Carlos Andrés Pérez
- Preceded by: Roberto Pocaterra Silva
- Succeeded by: Carlos Rafael Silva

Personal details
- Born: 5 December 1951 Porlamar, Venezuela
- Died: 24 August 2025 (aged 73) Almería, Spain
- Education: Andrés Bello Catholic University; London School of Economics; University of East Anglia

Pedro Antonio Rosas Bravo (5 December 1951 – 24 August 2025) was a Venezuelan economist and historian who served as Minister of Finance during the Second presidency of Carlos Andrés Pérez.

Rosas Bravo graduated with a cum laude degree in Economics from Andrés Bello Catholic University and Master of Science in Econometrics and Mathematical Economics joint programme from the London School of Economics and the University of East Anglia.

Rosas Bravo died from heart disease in Almería, Spain, on 24 August 2025, at the age of 73.
