= Freemasonry in Venezuela =

Freemasonry has been present in Venezuela since 1824 and has included a number of prominent politicians.

The Gran Logia de la Republica de Venezuela or Grand Lodge of the republic of Venezuela founded in 1824, is based in Caracas. It claims 121 Lodges as of 2006. It is a member of the Confederación Masónica Interamericana and the Confederación Masónica Bolivariana.

After the split between Colombia and Venezuela the Grand Lodge was refounded for Venezuela in 1838. Its first Grand Master was Diego Bautista Urbaneja Sturdy, who had been Vice President.

== Grand Masters ==
- Diego Bautista Urbaneja (1824-1844)
- Ignacio J. Charquet (1844-1847)
- Casimiro Hernández (1846-1851)
- Isidoro Hernández Bello (1851-1854)
- Manuel Felipe Tovar (1854-1856)
- Francisco Conde (1856-1857)
- Luis Delgado Correa (1857-1858)
- Antonio J. Rodríguez (1858-1860)
- Luis Delgado Correa (1860-1861)
- Fernando A. Díaz (1861-1863)
- Francisco Conde (1863-1865)
- Rafael Martínez (1865-1869)
- Fernando Arvelo (1869-1873)
- Juan C. Hurtado (1873-1877)
- Isaac J. Pardo (1877-1881)
- Federico M. Meyer (1881-1883)
- Pedro Madina (1883-1887)
- Agustín Coll Otero (1887-1889)
- Santiago Terrero Atienza (1889-1891)
- Pedro S. Delfino (1891-1893)
- Agustín Coll Otero (1893-1895)
- Wenceslao Carías Pérez (1895-1897)
- Lorenzo Matías López (1897-1899)
- Andrés A. Albor E. (1899-1901)
- José S. Gavazut (1901-1903)
- Francisco Brito L. (1903-1905)
- Joaquín Garrido (1905-1907)
- Domingo A. Coronil (1907-1909)
- Enrique B. Levy (1909-1911)
- Manuel Porras Ortiz (1911-1913)
- César Zumeta (1913-1915)
- Ignacio Larez Ruiz (1915-1917)
- Agustín Beroes (1917-1919)
- Aarón Benchetrit (1919-1921)
- Juan Bautista Ascanio Rodríguez (1921-1923)
- J. A. Valdivieso Montaño (1923-1925)
- Jacobo Bendanhan Ch. (1925-1927)
- Juan Clausel (1927-1929)
- J. P. Reyes Zumeta (1929)
- Adolfo Holmo (1929-1930)
- Jacobo Bendahan Ch (1930-1931)
- Celestino B. Romero (1931-1933)
- Agustín Beroes (1933-1935)
- Carlos E. Lemoine (1935-1937)
- P. A. Ruiz Paz Castillo (1937-1939)
- Fernando Marquiz (1939-1940)
- Juan Masó Benítez (1940-1941)
- L. Arturo Irazabel (1941-1943)
- Juvencio Ochoa (1943-1945)
- Buenaventura Briceño Belisario (1945-1947)
- Carlos Rodríguez Jiménez (1947)
- Agustín Beroes (1947-1948)
- José Tomás Uzcátegui (1948-1953)
- Rafael Ernesto Otero (1953-1954)
- Buenaventura Briceño Belisario (1954-1955)
- Augusto Ascanio Sauce (1955-1957)
- Heriberto González Méndez (1957-1958)
- Ezequiel Rodríguez Álvarez (1958-1959)
- José A. Campos Delgado (1959-1961)
- Balbino González Magallanes (1961-1963)
- Manuel Baptista Nava (1963-1969)
- José David Bohórquez (1969)
- Carlos Ramón Arévalo (1969-1971)
- Eduardo Lira Espejo (1971-1973)
- Julio León Madriz (1973-1975)
- Juan Francisco Lozano (1975-1977)
- Luis Germán Pepper (1977-1979)
- Santo Orlando G. (1979-1981)
- Carlos Ramón Arévalo (1981-1983)
- Pablo Emilio Trujillo Moreno (1983-1985)
- Luis Rafael Hernández Castellini (1985-1989)
- Aurelio Briceño (1989-1991)
- José Núñez Guaimare (1991-1993)
- Efraín Duránd Ramírez (1993-1995)
- Gilberto José Febres Medina (1995-1999)
- José Rafael Martínez Gamboa (1999-2001)
- Luis Porfirio Maíz Pinto (2001-2003)
- Pasquale Nappo Siniscalchi (2003-2005)
- Aurelio Briceño (2005)
- Rafael Delgado Meléndez (2005-2006)
- Reinaldo Díaz Molero (2006-2007)
- Augusto Díaz Pérez (2007-2009)
- Pietro Spadavecchia Stramaglia (2009-2011)
- Luis Pernalette Madrid (2011-2013)
- Mario Múnera Muñoz (2013-2015)
- Abelardo Yanji (2015-2017)
