= 1848–1849 Venezuelan civil war =

Civil war in Venezuela

Venezuelan civil war of 1848-1849
- Part of the Venezuelan civil wars
Date	1848-1849
Location	Venezuela
Result	Monaguist victory Consolidation of the First Liberal Autocracy until the Revolution of 1859

Belligerents
Conservative rebels	Liberal Government

Commanders and leaders
José Antonio Páez	José Tadeo Monagas

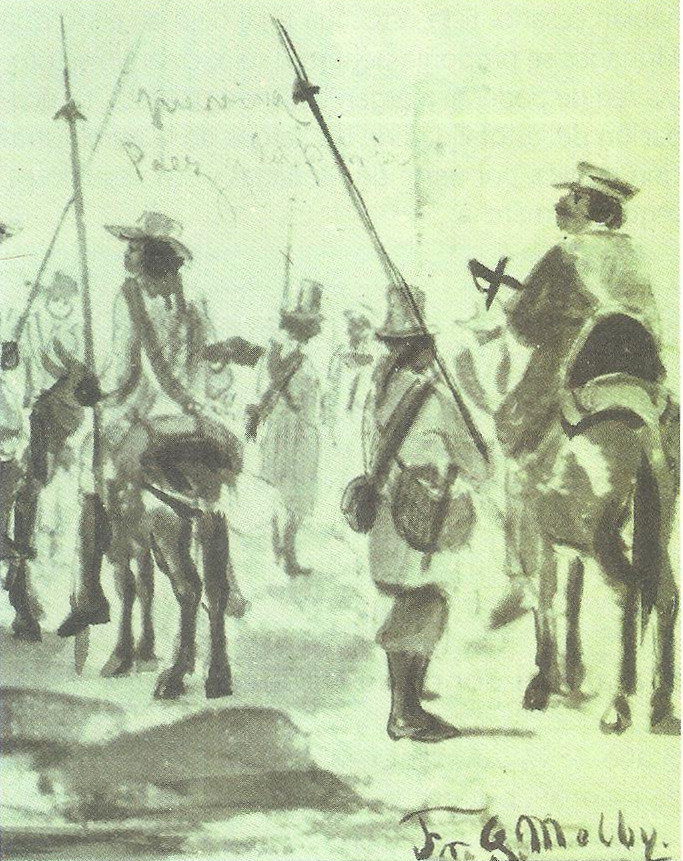
Presidential guard of General José Tadeo Monagas. Detail of an ink drawing by Fritz Melbye.

The civil war of 1848-1849 was an armed conflict in Venezuela between the conservatives, led by José Antonio Páez, against the newly established Great Liberal Party, founded and led by José Tadeo Monagas.

== Background ==
The precursors to this conflict go back to the Peasant Insurrection of 1846. After the defeat of this popular movement, led by the Liberal Party, José Tadeo Monagas was chosen as Presidential candidate by the conservative party as a figure who could achieve reconciliation.

Monagas triumphed in the election and assumed the Presidency of the Republic. Páez and the conservatives tried to control him, but he soon distanced himself from the conservatives and approached the liberals. The congress (dominated by the conservative party) tried to prosecute Monagas on charges of constitutional violations but this attempt failed after the congress was stormed by a liberal mob and was silenced.

== Conflict ==
Paez took up arms on 4 February 1848 in Calabozo, where he proclaimed himself chief of operations of the armies with the purpose to restore constitutional order. His military moved to Apure, where he took San Fernando de Apure. Monagas appointed General Santiago Mariño commander of the Liberal army, who sent a column of troops against Páez and defeated him on 10 March at the Battle of Los Araguatos. After this incident, Páez left the country.

Meanwhile, the fighting was concentrated in the west of the country, in Coro and Zulia. Páez invaded from La Vela de Coro in 1849 and advanced to Cojedes y, but when his rearguard was defeated in Casupo, he surrendered in Macapo Abajo before General José Laurencio Silva.

With the main leader of the conservative rebellion captured, the movement lost strength and ended almost entirely with the taking of Maracaibo by liberal troops. With the defeat of the conservative reaction, the First Liberal Autocracy was consolidated, which would last until the Revolution of 1859.

== Naval blockade of Maracaibo ==
On 17 August 1848, the schooners "Constitución" and "Restauración" appeared before Carúpano, commanded by Captain José Celis and loyal to the Páez conservative rebellion. After unsuccessfully attacking the plaza, the two conservative schooners withdrew, and sailed to Maracaibo, where a rebel squadron was gathering. Knowing this, the government ordered the concentration of naval forces in La Guaira, in order to organize a naval expedition against the conservative forces concentrated in Maracaibo.

In October 1848, the National Squadron was organized in Puerto Cabello to confront the revolutionaries. They sailed to Capan (Falcón State), where the preparation of the boats was completed. General Monagas appointed General Justo Briceño as Head of Sea and Land Operations for his actions in Maracaibo. The government squadron consisted of two divisions, one commanded by Colonel José María García and the other by Lieutenant Antonio Gregorio Lion. In total it had the brigs “Manzanares”, “Congreso”, and “Presidente”, the brigs- schooners “Ávila” and “Diana”, the schooners “Independencia”, “Estrella”, “Forzosa”, Fama, Democracia, “Eclipse”, “Intrépida” and “Boliviana”, and the war steamer “Libertador”. On October 6th they sailed towards the entrance of Lake Maracaibo, called Barra de Maracaibo. The next day they recognized the entrance and on the 8th they entered the Bay. Six revolutionary ships tried to cut them off, but were dispersed and took refuge under the fire of the San Carlos de la Barra Fortress. Once the Barra de Maracaibo was occupied, the naval forces of the Government demanded the surrender of the revolutionaries. They requested a period of 48 hours, which they used to prepare to fight.

At dawn on 13 October, the conservatives attacked the constitutional forces with 17 ships, but were defeated after two hours of combat, in which they lost three ships, and were dispersed at the end. After the battle the revolutionaries gathered at the mouth of the Zulia River on 23 December, where they were joined by ground forces from San Carlos Castle, protecting themselves with the ships that still remained, among them the steamer "General Jackson", armed with a 24-pounder cannon, a 8-pounder and another 4-pounder.

General Justo Briceño attacked the rebels at this position on December 31, defeated them, and captured the steamer, 7 feluccas, and 30 canoes. Afterwards, the National Squadron took the steamers "Libertador", "Tritón" and "General Jackson", in addition to the schooner "Intrepida".

== José Antonio Páez invasion ==
The general José Antonio Páez exilated in Curazao invades Venezuela from La Vela de Coro on July 2, 1849 with the aim of overhthron the President Jose Tadeo Monagas government. After landed the revolutionaries penetrates as far as Cojedes plains with the support of León de Febres Cordero and his son Ramón Páez. Santiago Mariño and José Gregorio Monagas surround Páez's forces. Juan Antonio Sotillo defeats Lorenzo Belisario and Nicasio Belisario at the Manapire Pass on July 17, has their bodies decapitated, and sends the heads to President José Tadeo Monagas. Sotillo also defeated Felipe Macero and José Antonio Páez's rearguard was attacked at the Battle of Casupo, forcing him to capitulate in Macapo to General José Laurencio Silva. In violation of the capitulation, Páez and his men were arrested by Joaquín Herrera.

With the capture of the main leader of the conservative rebellion, the movement lost strength and ended almost entirely with the capture of Maracaibo by liberal troops. The defeated unsuccessfully requested foreign intervention.[2] With the defeat of the conservative reaction, the First Liberal Autocracy was consolidated, which would last until the March Revolution.

== See also ==
- Barquisimeto rebellion

== Bibliography ==
- Esteves González, Edgar (2006). Las Guerras de Los Caudillos. Caracas: El Nacional. ISBN 980-388-247-3.
- Dixon, Jeffrey S. & Meredith Reid Sarkees (2015). A Guide to Intra-state Wars: An Examination of Civil, Regional, and Intercommunal Wars, 1816–2014. CQ Press. ISBN 9781506317984.
