= Diego Bautista Urbaneja =

Venezuelan politician

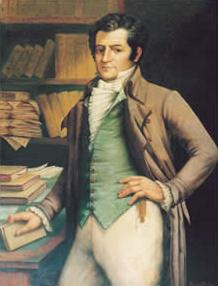

Vice President of Venezuela
- In office 1830–1833
- President: José Antonio Páez
- Succeeded by: Andrés Narvarte
- In office 1837–1837
- President: José María Carreño

Minister of Foreign Affairs of Venezuela
- In office 13 January 1830 – 28 May 1830
- President: José Antonio Páez
- Preceded by: Position created
- Succeeded by: Santos Michelena

Personal details
- Born: December 16, 1782
- Died: January 12, 1856 (aged 73)

Diego Bautista Urbaneja (Barcelona, Province of Cumaná, Captaincy General of Venezuela, Viceroyalty of New Granada, Spanish Empire, December 16, 1782 – Caracas, Province of Caracas, Venezuela, January 12, 1856) was a Venezuelan political figure.

== Biography ==
In 1830, when Venezuela achieved independence after the dissolution of Gran Colombia, he became the Minister of Finance in 1830. He also became the second Minister of Foreign Affairs of Venezuela after Juan Germán Roscio.

By 1835, the National Library was situated in the convent of the future Palacio de las Academias, with Diego Bautista Urbaneja being the first director (c. 1833–35).

The Gran Logia de la Republica de Venezuela or Grand Lodge of the Republic of Venezuela, founded in 1824, is based in Caracas. After the split between Colombia and Venezuela, the Freemasonry in Venezuela Grand Lodge was refounded for Venezuela in 1838. Its first Grand Master was Diego Bautista Urbaneja, who had been vice president.

== Legacy ==
The Diego Bautista Urbaneja Municipality is named after him.

== See also ==
- List of ministers of foreign affairs of Venezuela
- List of people on the postage stamps of Venezuela
- Freemasonry in Venezuela

Political offices
Preceded by Position created	Vice President of Venezuela; 1830-1833	Succeeded by Andrés Narvarte
Preceded by José María Carreño	Vice President of Venezuela; 1837	Succeeded by Carlos Soublette
Preceded by Santos Michelena	Vice President of Venezuela; 1845-1847	Succeeded by Antonio Leocadio Guzmán
Preceded by New position	3rd Minister of Foreign Affairs of Venezuela; 13 January 1830 – 28 May 1830	Succeeded by Santos Michelena
