= Santos Michelena =

Venezuelan politician

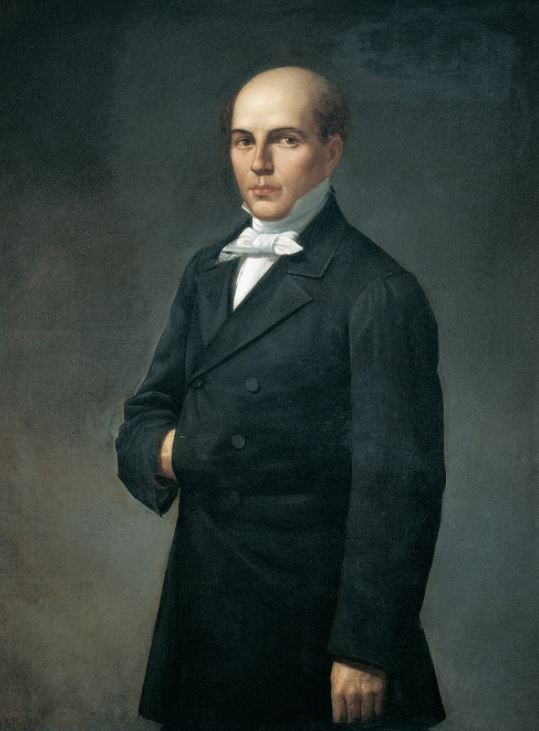

Vice President of Venezuela
- In office 1841–1845
- President: José Antonio Páez
- Preceded by: Carlos Soublette
- Succeeded by: Diego Bautista Urbaneja
- President: José María Carreño

Minister of Foreign Affairs of Venezuela
- In office 28 May 1830 – 8 June 1833
- President: José Antonio Páez
- In office 29 March 1835 – 26 November 1835
- President: José María Vargas
- In office 12 April 1837 – 30 May 1837
- President: Carlos Soublette

Personal details
- Born: 1797 Maracay, Aragua
- Died: 1848 (aged 50–51)
- Party: Conservative Party

Santos Michelena (1797–1848) was a Venezuelan politician. Born on November 1, 1797 in Maracay, Province of Caracas, Captaincy General of Venezuela, Viceroyalty of New Granada, Spanish Empire. He was the vice president of Venezuela from 1841 until 1845. He also served as Minister of Foreign Affairs of Venezuela three times, under three different presidents. He was the Minister of Finance from 1830 to 1833, from 1834 to 1835 and in 1837.

He died on March 12, 1848, at the age of 50, in Caracas, Province of Caracas, Venezuela.

Political offices
Preceded by Carlos Soublette	Vice President of Venezuela; 1841-1845	Succeeded by Diego Bautista Urbaneja
Preceded by Diego Bautista Urbaneja	Minister of Foreign Affairs of Venezuela; 28 May 1830 – 8 June 1833	Succeeded by José Luis Ramos
Preceded by José Luis Ramos	Minister of Foreign Affair of Venezuela; 29 March 1835 – 26 November 1835	Succeeded by José Eusebio Gallegos
Preceded by José Luis Ramos	Minister of Foreign Affairs; 12 April 1837 – 30 May 1837	Succeeded by Guillermo Smith
