= José Antonio Mayobre =

José Antonio Mayobre (21 August 1913 in Cumaná – 15 August 1980 in Washington DC) was a Venezuelan economist who worked as an academic economist, a diplomat and international civil servant. He was a Minister of Finance of Venezuela and the Executive Secretary of the ECLAC.

== Education ==
Mayobre received a doctorate from Central University of Venezuela, in economic and social sciences, 1944, and in law, 1945. He went on to post-graduate studies at the London School of Economics. He held high-ranking posts as educator, economist, diplomat and international functionary.

== Career ==
Upon returning to his country in 1946, Mayobre worked in the Central Bank of Venezuela's Department of Economic Research and became its director. At the same time he taught Economic analysis at the Central University of Venezuela's Faculty of Economics, a post he held on several occasions until 1960.

In 1947, he was appointed alternate Governor of the International Monetary Fund representing Venezuela, and in 1948 he was appointed General Director of Banco Agrícola y Pecuario. From 1949 to 1951 he was General Manager of Industrias Azucareras S.A., in Caracas.

Following the assassination of the president Carlos Delgado Chalbaud, on November 13, 1950, Mayobre went into exile again. He joined the United Nations Secretariat in 1951 as the Delegated Director of ECLAC's subregional headquarters in Mexico. Then, in 1953, he was appointed Resident Representative of the United Nations' Technical Assistance Board in Central America. He returned to ECLAC in Santiago de Chile, where he headed the Economic Development Division from 1954 to 1958. He returned to Venezuela to direct the Corporación Venezolana de Comercio (Venezuelan Trade Corporation).

In May 1958 he was appointed Minister of Finance of president Rómulo Betancourt, a post he held until 1960. From 1960 to 1962, Mayobre was Venezuela's Ambassador to the United States and the Organization of American States, in Washington, where he also worked as Executive Director of the International Monetary Fund. In 1963 was designated by U Thant Executive Secretary of the ECLAC in substitution of Argentinian Raúl Prebisch until 1966.

He returned to Venezuela from Santiago de Chile during the presidency of Raúl Leoni and was nominated Minister of Mines and Hydrocarbons and Minister of Finance. In 70th decade was adviser of Universidad Metropolitana and Universidad Simón Bolívar. En 1975 was member of Energy National Council.
