= Dominga Ortiz Orzúa =

Three-time First Lady of Venezuela, wife of José Antonio Páez

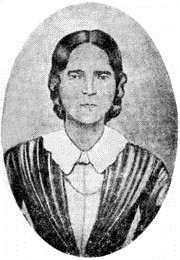

First Lady of Venezuela
- President: José Antonio Páez
- In role 13 January 1830 – 20 January 1835
- Preceded by: Position created
- Succeeded by: Encarnación Maitín
- In role 1 February 1839 – 28 January 1843
- Preceded by: Olalla Buroz y Tovar
- Succeeded by: Olalla Buroz y Tovar
- In role 29 August 1861 – 15 June 1863
- Preceded by: Encarnación Rivas Pacheco
- Succeeded by: Luisa Isabel Pachano Muñoz

Personal details
- Born: Dominga Ortiz Orzúa; November 1, 1792 Canaguá, Barinas, Captaincy General of Venezuela
- Died: December 31, 1875 (aged 83) Caracas, Venezuela
- Party: Conservative
- Spouse(s): José Antonio Páez (m. 18??; died 1873)
- Children: 2

Dominga Ortiz Orzúa (November 1, 1792 - December 31, 1875) was three-time First Lady of Venezuela. She was born in Canaguá, Barinas, Captaincy General of Venezuela in 1792 and died in Caracas, Venezuela in 1875.

== Personal life ==
Married to President José Antonio Páez, she had two children, Manuel A. Páez and María del Rosario Páez de Llamosas.

== See also ==
- List of first ladies of Venezuela
- Politics of Venezuela

Honorary titles
Preceded by Position created	First Lady of Venezuela; 1830–1835	Succeeded by Encarnación Maitín
Preceded by Olalla Buroz y Tovar	First Lady of Venezuela; 1839–1843	Succeeded by Olalla Buroz y Tovar
Preceded by Encarnación Rivas Pacheco	First Lady of Venezuela; 1861–1863	Succeeded by Luisa Isabel Pachano Muñoz
