= Roberto Pocaterra =

Venezuelan former ministry of finance and congressman

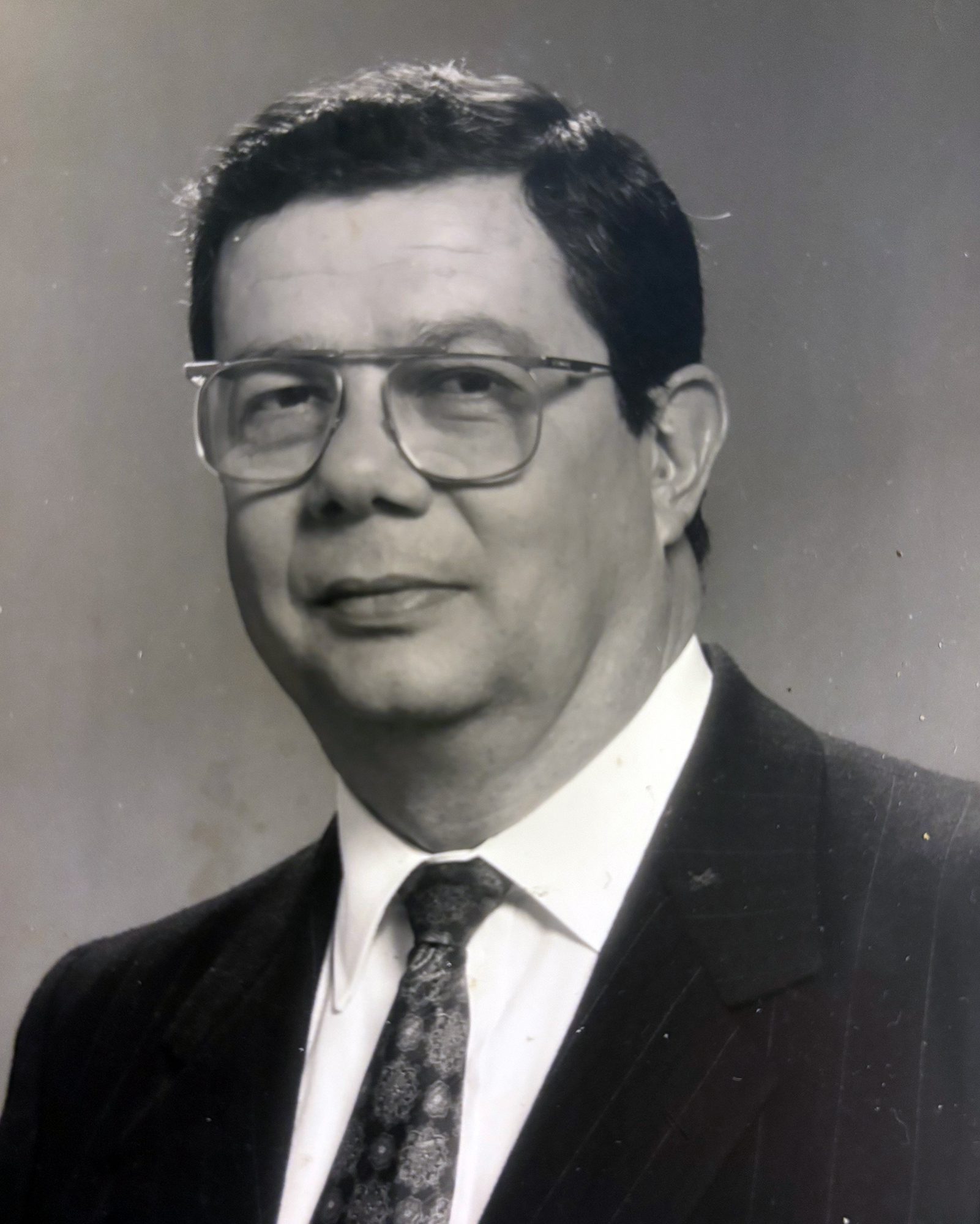

Personal details
- Born: Caracas, Venezuela
- Party: Acción Democrática
- Education: Universidad Católica Andrés Bello, Pontifical Gregorian University
- Nickname: Bobby Pocaterra

Roberto "Bobby" Pocaterra Silva (1 October 1941 – 22 April 2016 in Caracas, Venezuela) was a Venezuelan economist, professor and politician. He was twice congressman of the Congress of Venezuela, Minister of Finance and president of the Banco Industrial de Venezuela.

== Biography ==
He studied at the San Ignacio de Loyola School in Caracas and later attended the San Jose boarding school in Mérida as a teenager. As a student activist in this city, he participated in the national protests that preceded overthrow of Marcos Perez Jimenez on January 23, 1958.

He began studying Medicine but later switched to Economics at Andrés Bello Catholic University, from which he graduated. Thanks to a scholarship from the Fundación Polar, he studied a master at Pontifical Gregorian University.

== Political career ==
During Venezuela's first democratic government, his uncle, Julio Pocaterra, was one of President Rómulo Betancourt's closest confidants and convinced him to make his son his personal secretary. From then on, he developed his entire political career under the colors of Democratic Action (Venezuela).

In 1976, was designed as acting Ministry of Development under the first government of Carlos Andrés Pérez.

On February 27, 1988, he was appointed president of the Banco Industrial de Venezuela -a position he held until 1990- where he was in charge of reforming the institution's organizational structure to adapt to the needs of a country that was coming out of a major economic recession that led to El Caracazo. When he assumed the presidency, the institution's inherited liabilities amounted to almost US$3.6 billion from a debt restructuring that had been carried out in 1983. The new decisions made under his presidency allowed for the reactivation of many construction and infrastructure projects that were being developed in the eastern part of the country, mainly on Margarita Island, where they came to concentrate 75% of the credit portfolio in construction projects.

In 1989, he proposed to Congress the modification of the Income tax Law and the creation of the Value-added tax (VAT), which were approved two years later.

That same year, he was appointed Chief executive officer by the annual assembly of L-Bank, a cooperation system between European and Latin American private banks, made up of 22 commercial banks.

Between 1990 and 1992, during Carlos Andrés Pérez's second term, he held the position of Ministry of Finance. As part of his management, in 1991 he negotiated a US$19.7 million international financing from foreign banks for Venezuela and the modernization of the customs system at the country's airports, mainly the Simón Bolívar International Airport.

In 1993, he internally contested within Accion Democratica the possibility of being a candidate for mayor of Caracas, but the party opted for Claudio Fermín who ultimately lost the election to Aristóbulo Istúriz.

== See also ==
- History of Venezuela
