= Carlos Soublette =

President of Venezuela from 1837 to 1839 and from 1843 to 1847

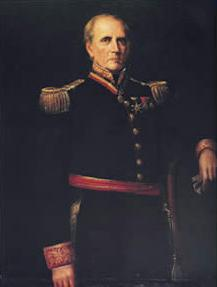
- Portrait by Martín Tovar y Tovar

7th and 9th President of Venezuela
- In office 28 January 1843 – 1 March 1847
- Vice President: Santos Michelena (1843–1845); Diego Bautista Urbaneja (1845–1847)
- Preceded by: José Antonio Páez
- Succeeded by: José Tadeo Monagas
- In office 11 March 1837 – 1 February 1839
- Vice President: Himself
- Preceded by: José María Carreño
- Succeeded by: José Antonio Páez

9th Vice President of Venezuela
- In office 1 February 1839 – 1841
- President: José Antonio Páez
- Preceded by: Diego Bautista Urbaneja (1837)
- Succeeded by: Santos Michelena

Minister of Foreign Affairs
- In office 24 February 1858 – 4 April 1859
- President: Julián Castro
- Preceded by: Luis Sanojo
- Succeeded by: Pedro de las Casas

Personal details
- Born: 15 December 1789 La Guaira, Captaincy General of Venezuela, Spanish Empire
- Died: 11 February 1870 (aged 80) Caracas, United States of Venezuela
- Citizenship: Spanish (1789–1810); Venezuelan (1817–1819); Colombian (1819–1830); Venezuelan (1830–1870)
- Spouse: Olalla Buroz y Tovar

Military service
- Branch/service: Venezuelan Patriotic Army
- Years of service: 1810–1830
- Rank: Divisional general
- Battles/wars: Venezuelan War of Independence

Carlos Valentín José de la Soledad Antonio del Sacramento de Soublette y Jerez de Aristeguieta (15 December 1789 – 11 February 1870) was a Venezuelan politician and military officer who was the 7th and 9th president of Venezuela from 1837 to 1839 and again from 1843 to 1847 and a hero of the Venezuelan War of Independence.

== Interim government ==
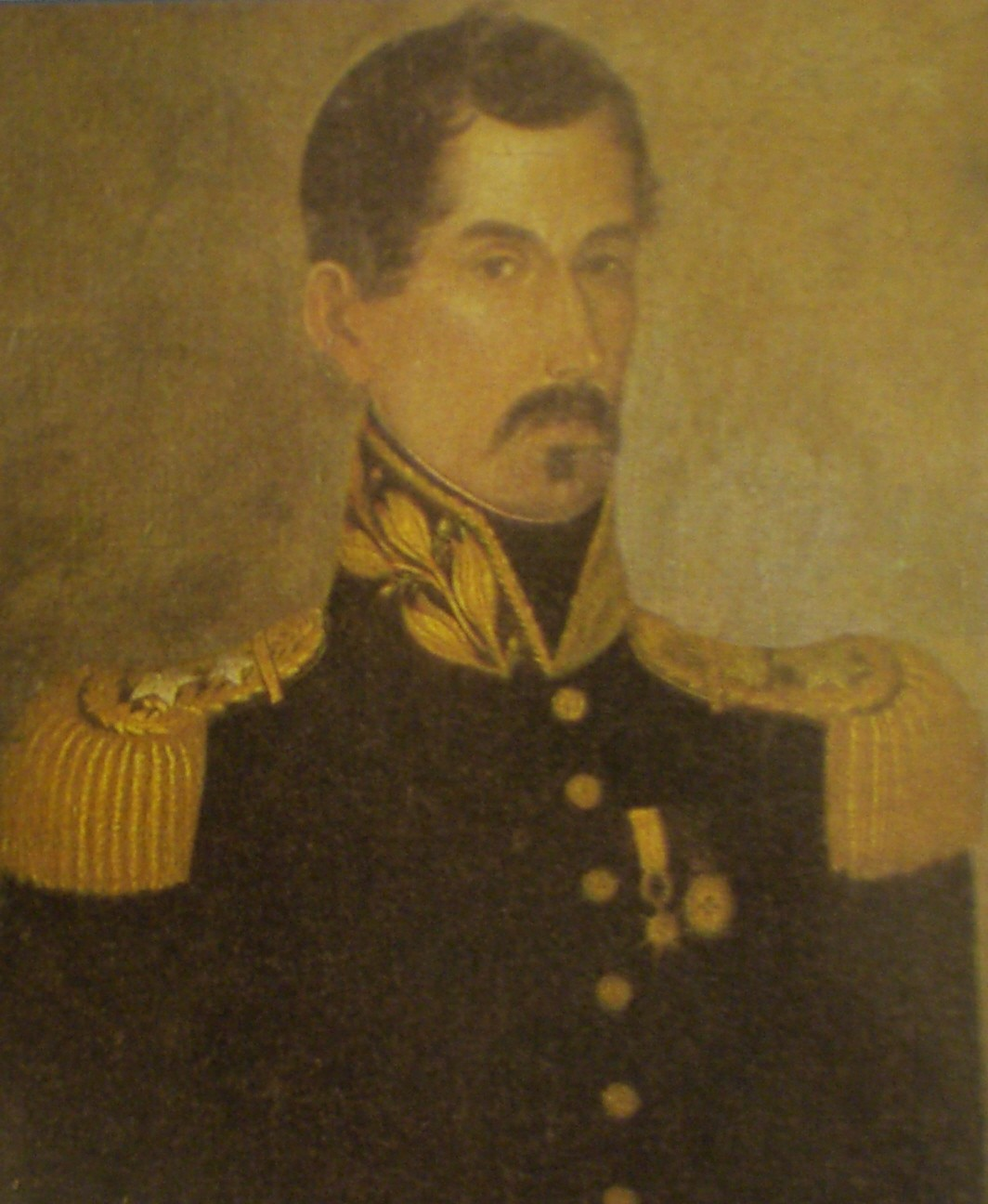
Carlos Soublette

The interim government of Carlos Soublette was the first government of Soublette, who was appointed by the National Congress to finish the presidential term of José María Vargas after his resignation in 1836. Soublette assumed office in 1837 and served until 1839.

== Second presidency ==
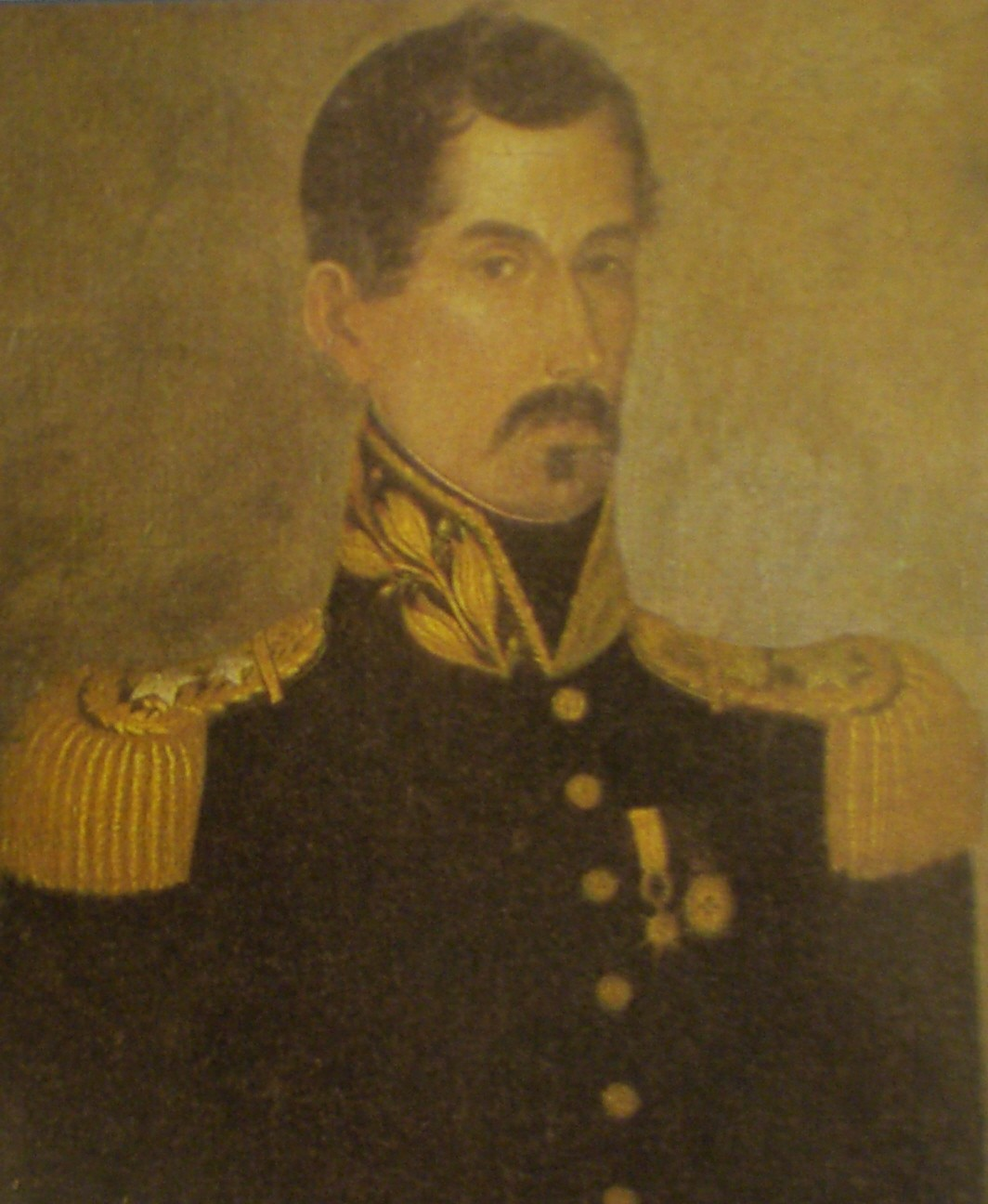
Carlos Soublette

The second presidency of Carlos Soublette was elected through indirect elections by the National Congress. It was Soublette's last presidential term, and he handed over power to Diego Bautista Urbaneja in 1847.

== Personal life ==
Soublette was married to Olalla Buroz y Tovar, who served as First Lady of Venezuela from 1837 to 1839 and 1843 to 1847.

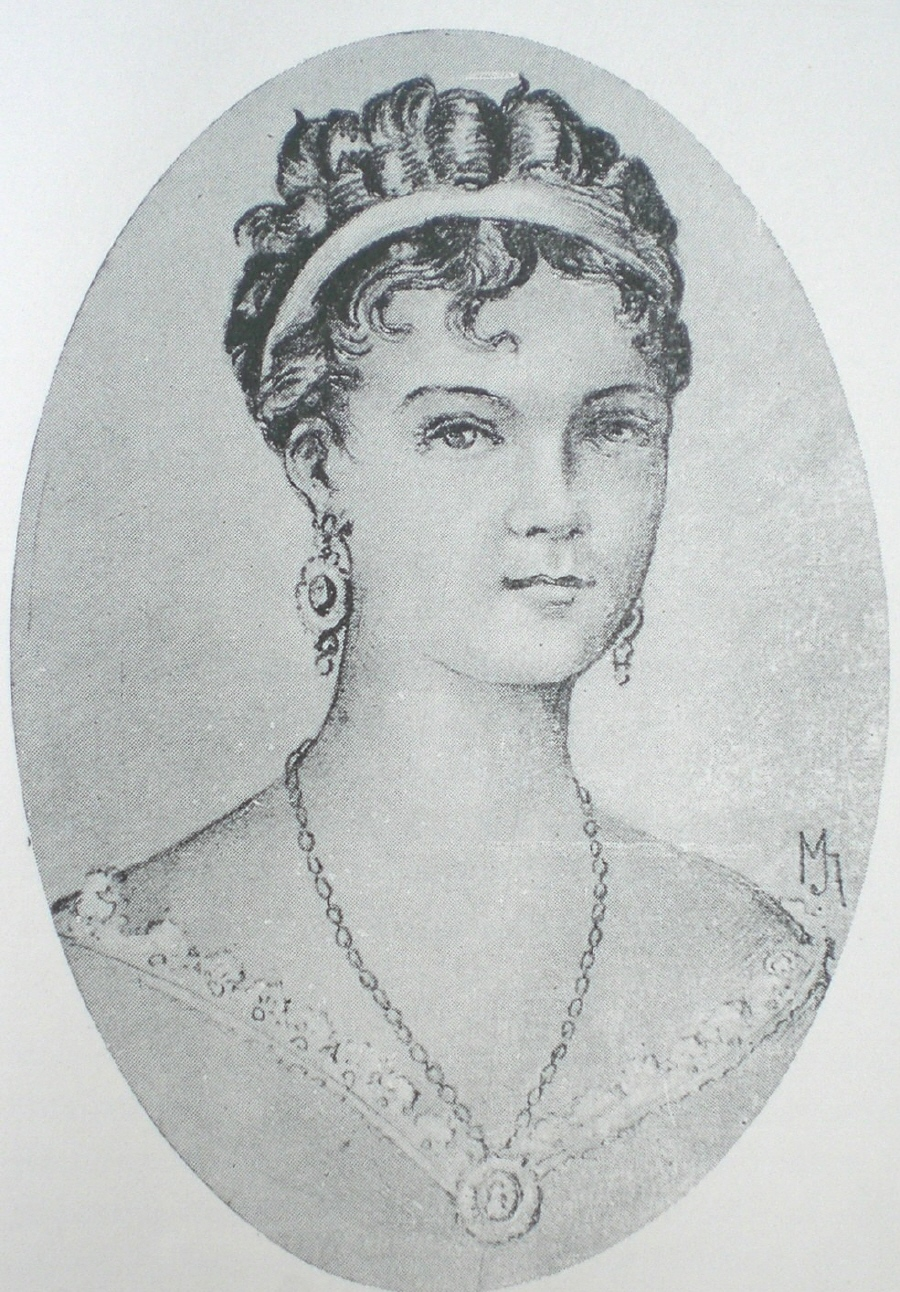
Olalla Buroz y Tovar

== See also ==
- List of ministers of foreign affairs of Venezuela
- List of presidents of Venezuela

Political offices
Preceded by José María Carreño	President of Venezuela; 11 March 1837 – 1 February 1839	Succeeded by José Antonio Páez
Preceded by José Antonio Páez	President of Venezuela; 28 January 1843 – 1 March 1847	Succeeded by José Tadeo Monagas
Preceded by Luis Sanojo	Minister of Foreign Affairs of Venezuela; 24 February 1858-4 April 1859	Succeeded by Pedro de las Casas
