= José Antonio Páez =

President of Venezuela

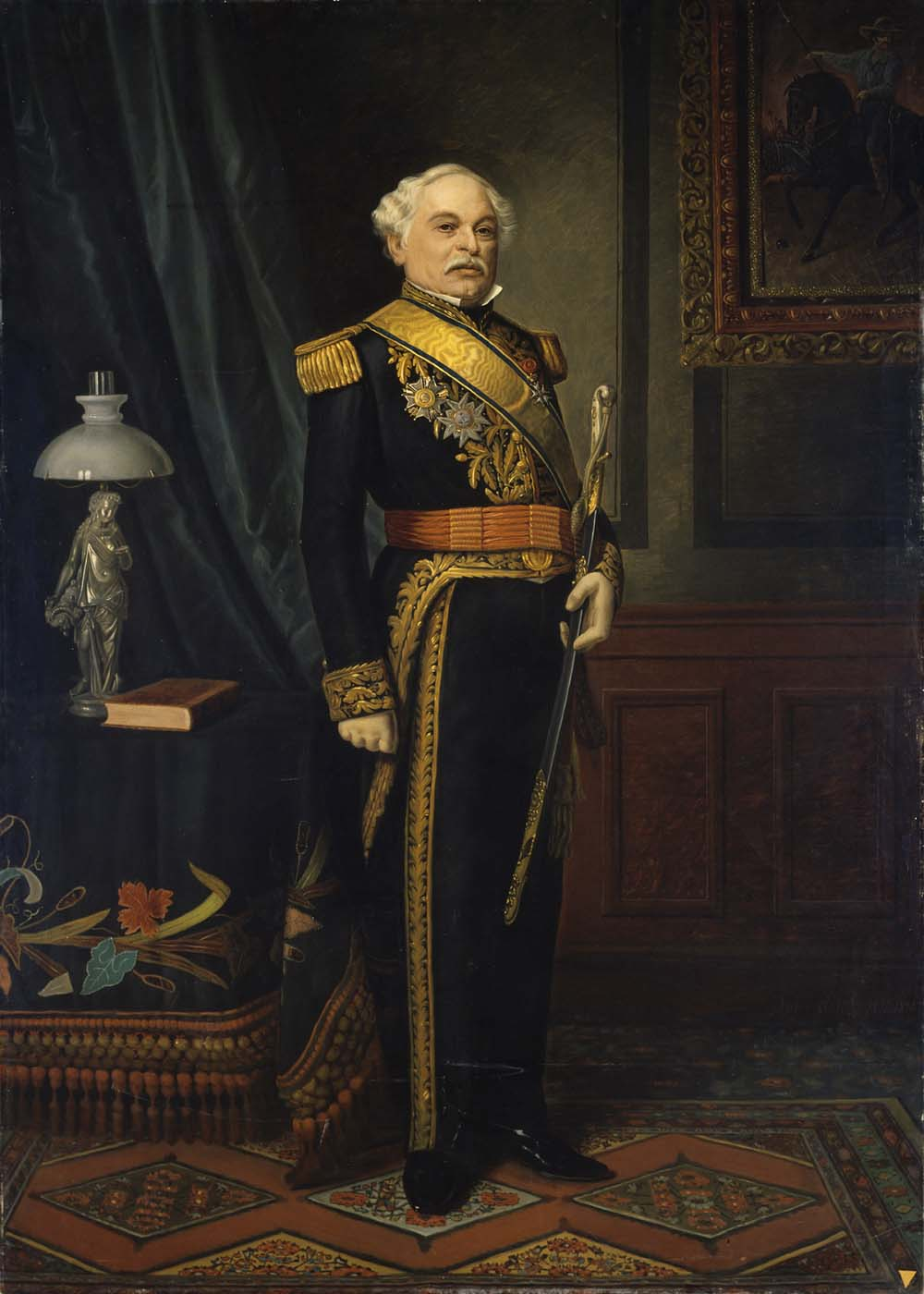
- Posthumous portrait by John J. Peoli, 1890

5th, 8th and 15th President of Venezuela
- In office 29 August 1861 – 15 June 1863
- Vice President: Vacant
- Preceded by: Pedro Gual Escandón (Interim)
- Succeeded by: Juan Crisóstomo Falcón
- In office 1 February 1839 – 28 January 1843
- Vice President: Carlos Soublette (1839–1841); Santos Michelena (1841–1843)
- Preceded by: Carlos Soublette
- Succeeded by: Carlos Soublette
- In office 13 January 1830 – 20 January 1835
- Vice President: Diego Bautista Urbaneja (1830–1833); Andrés Narvarte (1833–1835)
- Preceded by: Simón Bolívar (as President of the Third Republic of Venezuela)
- Succeeded by: Andrés Narvarte (Interim)

Personal details
- Born: 13 June 1790 Curpa, Portuguesa, Captaincy General of Venezuela, Virreinato de la Nueva España, Spanish Empire
- Died: 6 May 1873 (aged 82) New York City, U.S.
- Citizenship: Spanish (1790–1810); Venezuelan (1817–1819); Colombian (1819–1830); Venezuelan (1830–1873)
- Spouse: Dominga Ortiz Orzúa (m. 1809)
- Domestic partner(s): Barbarita Nieves (1821–1847, her death)
- Children: 11
- Occupation: Politician
- Profession: Military officer

Military service
- Allegiance: State of Venezuela
- Branch/service: Venezuelan Army
- Years of service: 1809–1863
- Rank: General in Chief (from 1829)
- Battles/wars: Spanish American wars of independence; Venezuelan War of Independence; Campaign of the Center; Taking of the arrows; Battle of Calabozo; Battle of Cojedes; Battle of Mucuritas; Battle of El Yagual; Campaign of Apure; Battle of the Queseras del Medio; Second Battle of Carabobo; Campaign of the West; Fourth Siege of Puerto Cabello; Battle of Naguanagua; Fifth Siege of Puerta Cabello; Venezuelan civil wars; Revolution of the Reforms; Siege of Puerto Cabello (1835-1836); Insurrection of Farfán (1837); Battle of San Juan of Payara; Peasant Insurrection of Venezuela (1846-1847); Battle of Pagüito (1847); Venezuelan Civil War of 1848-1849; Battle of Los Araguatos (1848); Battle of Casupo (1849); Federal War; Battle of Los Colorados (1861)

José Antonio Páez Herrera (Spanish pronunciation: [xoˈse anˈtonjo ˈpaes eˈreɾa]; 13 June 1790 – 6 May 1873) was a Venezuelan politician and military officer who served as the president of Venezuela three times. The first as the 5th president from 1830 to 1835, the second as the 8th president from 1839 to 1843, and the third as the 15th president from 1861 to 1863. He fought against the Spanish Crown for Simón Bolívar during the Venezuelan War of Independence. Páez later led Venezuela's separation from Gran Colombia.

Páez dominated the country's politics for most of the next three decades once the country had achieved independence from Gran Colombia, serving either as president or as the power behind puppet presidents. He is considered a prime example of a 19th-century South American caudillo, saddling the country with a legacy of Liberal Party rule that lasted with only a few breaks until 1899. He lived in Buenos Aires and New York City during his years in exile and died in the latter in 1873.

== Biography ==
=== Early life ===
Páez was born in Curpa (now part of Acarigua), Portuguesa State in the Captaincy General of Venezuela – part of the Spanish Empire. His paternal grandmother, Luisa Antonia de Mendoza y Mota, was daughter of Luís Rodríguez de Mendoza, a native of Icod de los Vinos, Tenerife (Canary Island). He was of humble origins, his father being a low level employee of the colonial government. His mother Maria Violante Herrera is said to have been born in Quíbor, Lara as one of the descendants of Welser German settlers. She had a nickname "La Catira de los ojos azules" (The blue-eyed blonde [The term "catira" is a feminine form of "catire", a Venezuelan slang word for "blond."]) As a boy he was forced to work like a slave. By the age of 20, Páez was married and earning a living by trading cattle.

Late in 1810, he joined a cavalry squadron, led by a former employer, set up with the purpose of fighting the colonial government. In 1813, he asked for leave from his squadron with the intent of setting and leading his own, which he did, joining the Western Republican Army with the rank of sergeant. Páez had an ingratiating personality which made him very much liked amongst those who knew him. He was also looked up to for his skills as a horseman and for his physical capabilities.

=== Battles ===
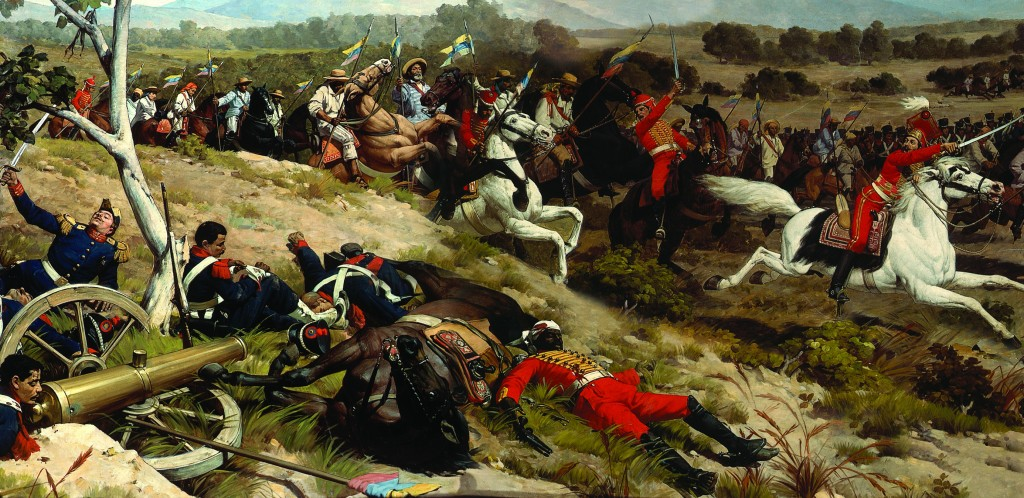
Páez and his soldiers at the Carabobo battle

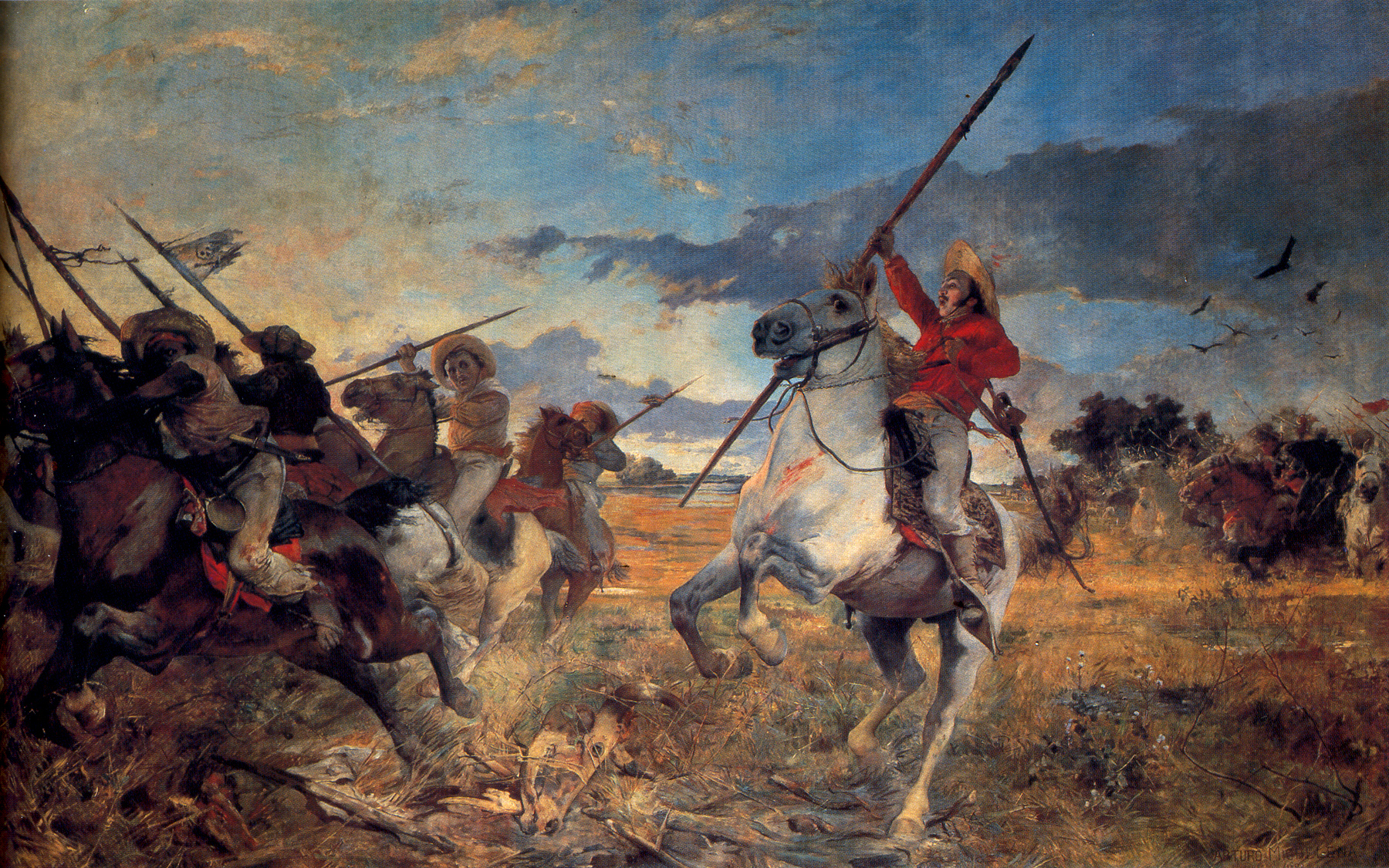
Páez at the battle of Las Queseras del Medio

Páez, a soldier at heart, started moving up the ranks by winning year after year several engagements against the royalists with his band of marauding llaneros (plainsmen). He came to be known by the nicknames of "El Centauro de los Llanos" (The Centaur of the Plains), and "El León de Payara" (The Lion of Payara) or (The Lion of Apure).

Páez had been leading the fighting in the plains while Simón Bolívar was busy with the eastern part of the country. Early in 1818, both men met to discuss better coordination of their efforts. They briefly combined their forces to fight Pablo Morillo. This campaign included an incident wherein Páez and fifty of his men swam on horseback across the alligator-ridden Apure River, seizing fourteen enemy boats in a rare instance of a cavalry attack defeating naval forces.

Páez was soon ordered to go back to the western plains, where he took from the Spanish the city of San Fernando in Apure.

Páez won all of six major battles that he led by himself, the most celebrated one being the Battle of Las Queseras del Medio.

Late in 1820, an armistice had been signed with the Spanish commander and a temporary suspension of hostilities had taken place. However, ongoing developments were making difficult to maintain the armistice and, consequently, it was agreed it would lapse on 28 April 1821.

All five major fighting groups of the Venezuelan army were to start moving towards a central area. Some with the purpose of joining together in one single group and others with the intention of guarding the approach to that region to prevent royalists units from other far away areas from converging and reinforcing the main Spanish army stationed in the same area.

In early June 1821, the 6,500 men republican army was divided and organized in three divisions. The 1st division, made up of 2,500 men, was under Páez's command and formed by two battalions: Bravos de Apure (Apure Braves) and Cazadores Britanicos (British Hunters or as more often translated to English, the British Legions) and seven cavalry regiments.

By 20 June, all three republican divisions converge from different directions in the plain of Carabobo. With the royalists well entrenched in the center and the south, on the morning of 21 June, Páez was given command of an additional cavalry regiment and ordered to take it together with his own division through the hills on the north side and into the plain and to engage the Spanish, while the 2nd division would stay behind Páez and the 3rd would remain in a defensive position waiting to engage the enemy in the center.

On seeing Páez's men move, the Spanish commander, Miguel de la Torre, ordered one of his elite battalions, the Burgos, to reinforce and defend the north flank. Initially, the Spanish fiercely engaged the Bravos de Apure battalion that it had to fall back on two occasions. Páez sent his Cazadores Britanicos to help the Bravos and together they fought back the Spanish, now reinforced themselves by two additional battalions. As the fighting intensified, de la Torre sent more troops to the north. Páez then sent his cavalry further north to outflank the Spanish and come down on the plain from behind. At this moment, the battle went against the Spanish, who in desperation kept sending reinforcements. In the meantime, Páez's men were gaining terrain and closing on falling Spanish from all sides. Some of the Spanish battalions supposed to join and reinforce the engagement in the north, on seeing how their comrades fared, decided to retreat. As it became clear that the republicans were winning the battle, the other divisions moved forward, but by now the bulk of the work had already been done by Páez and his men.

With the Battle of Carabobo, the military fate of the Spanish army in Venezuela was sealed. The victory was carried by Páez. Bolívar promoted him on site to General in Chief of the republican army.

In the battle, the Spanish lost over 65% of their men; the survivors took refuge in the castle of Puerto Cabello. Until it was taken by Páez and his men in 1823, this was the last Spanish stronghold in Venezuela territory.

=== Promotion ===
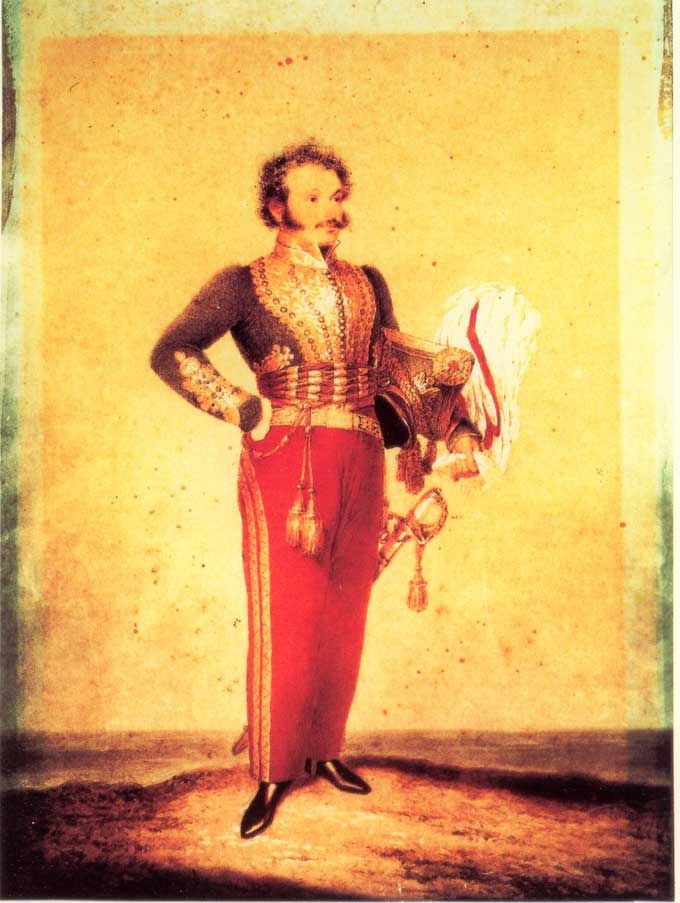
José Antonio Páez in 1828

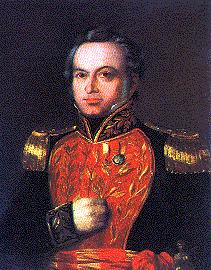
Páez by Lewis B. Adams, 1838

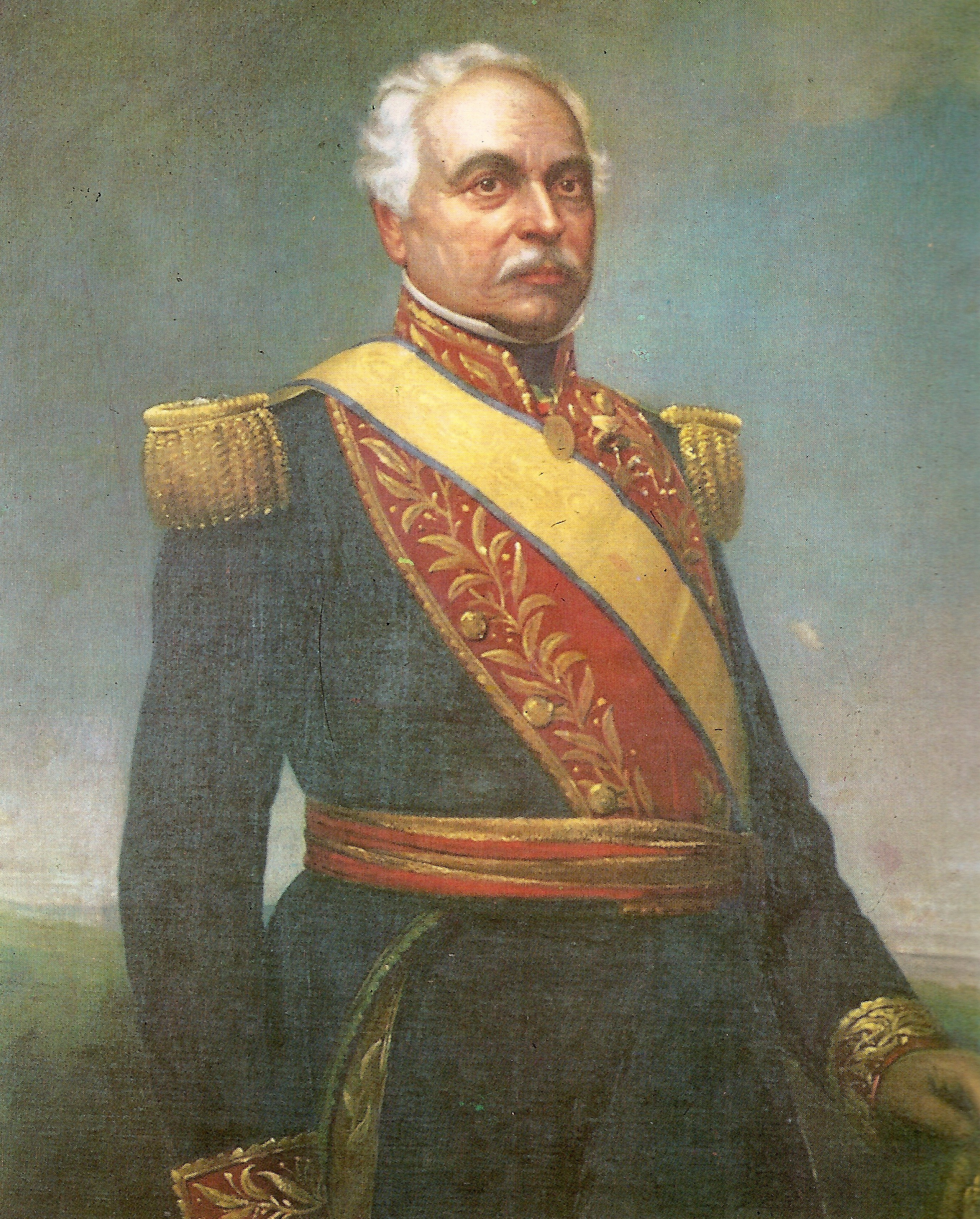
José Antonio Páez, by Martín Tovar y Tovar, 1874.

Following the Battle of Carabobo, Páez was named General Commander of the provinces of Caracas and Barinas (at the time they included the important regions of Caracas, Barquisimeto, Barinas and Apure).

It had been Bolivar's dream to unite the liberated Spanish provinces into a single great country: La Gran Colombia. This was made up of present-day Colombia, Venezuela, Ecuador, and Panama. As the war against Spain came to an end, federalist and regionalist sentiments began to arise in these areas.

While Bolívar was engaged in military campaigns in Peru, he was unable to carry on his duties as president of Gran Colombia. As a result, the center of power of the executive branch was in Bogotá under the leadership of Vice President Francisco de Paula Santander, from New Granada (modern-day Colombia, Ecuador, and Panama). While some leaders saw Gran Colombia as only a military necessity, others considered it an active administrative entity. Confusion arose between the central government in Bogotá and the provinces and the municipalities.

=== La Cosiata ===
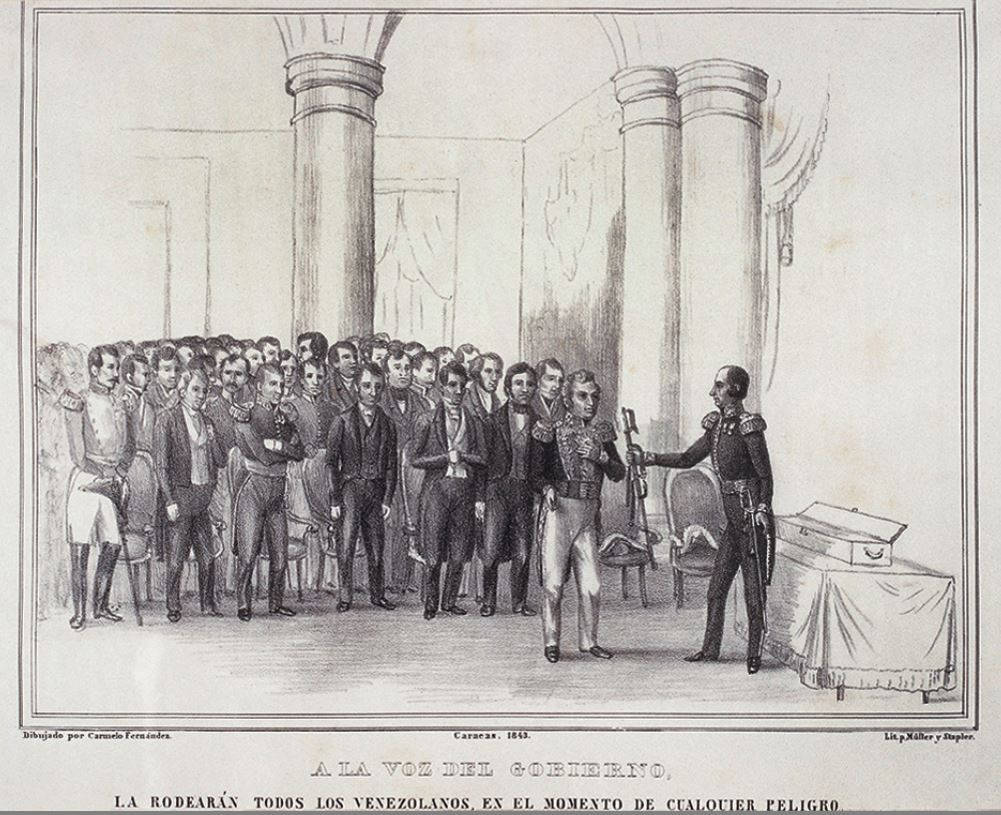
José Antonio Páez receives from Carlos Soublette the Sword of Honor on 19 March 1843

In April 1826, Páez was severely criticized for his methods of conscription. Locals attempted to have him removed, but Páez claimed to be acting within his orders. The central government decided to hold a trial.

Páez was initially willing to go, but with backing from some in Valencia and Caracas the general changed his mind and decided to neither submit to trial nor relinquish his post. Páez and his supporters were willing to have Bolívar as supreme leader, but they were reluctant to follow Santander. While they wanted changes to be made to the constitution, they initially wanted to do it under Bolívar as part of the Gran Colombia. Páez wrote to Bolívar, asking him to come back to take charge and solve the imbroglio. Santander declared Páez to be in open rebellion against the central government. Páez initially stated that he would wait for Bolívar to return before making any changes in Venezuela, but eventually started suppressing the press, modifying tariff enforcement, and conscription enforcement before Bolívar was able to return. Venezuela's political unity fractured as ties to Santander, Páez, and Bolívar conflicted. Páez began to fight a civil conflict with various factions in Venezuela in which few died.

Bolívar, finally returned from his campaigns in the south, took command of the executive towards the end of 1826. He assumed the extraordinary powers granted to him by the Congress. Conflicting letters between Santander and Bolívar, and Bolívar and Páez, created a degree of uncertainty as to what he would do. Páez demanded a general amnesty for himself and his supporters which Bolívar granted in return for reestablishing control over Venezuela.

Páez welcomed Bolívar and accepted his authority, and Bolívar named him Supreme Civil and Military Commander of Venezuela. This action confused and disappointed both Santander in Bogotá and the few local officials in Venezuela who had not supported the La Cosiata. They were removed or transferred to other posts while those who had backed Páez remained or were promoted.

Until La Cosiata, Páez had been mostly respected as a result of his military successes during the war. From that time, he started to be seen as a politician with the power and the wit needed to pursue and defend any changes, or lack thereof, made under the constitutional order. Páez came out from La Cosiata with more power than he had before.

=== President ===
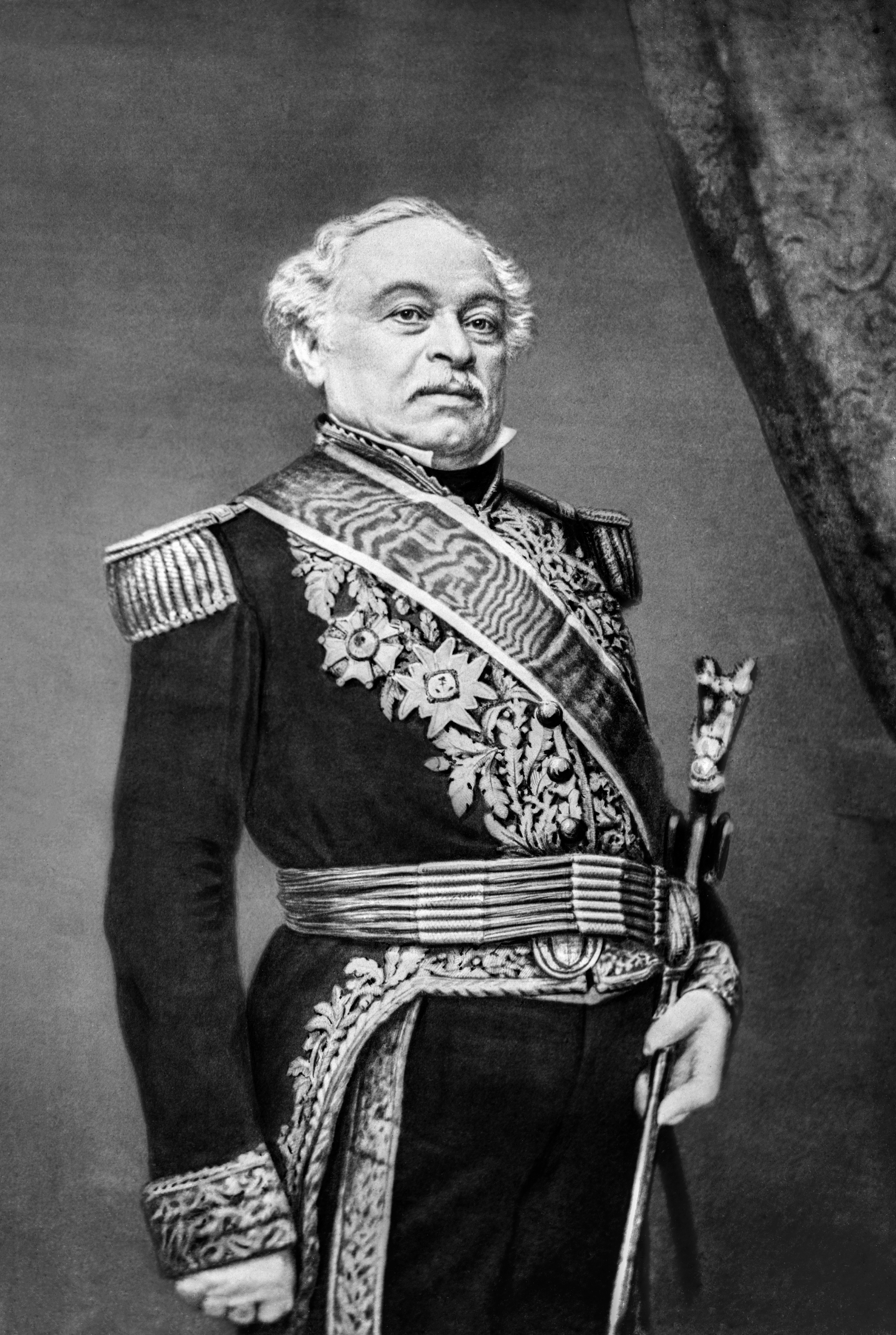
Portrait of Páez in 1854

In 1830, Páez declared Venezuela independent from Gran Colombia and became president. Although he was not the first president of Venezuela (which declared its independence from Spain in 1811 and named Cristóbal Mendoza as president), he was the first head of government after the dissolution of Gran Colombia. From 1830 to 1847, Páez was the most powerful man in Venezuela. He served as president only twice during this time (1830–1835 and 1839–1842), but ruled as the power behind puppet presidents when he was not in office. The government, dominated by the oligarchy, followed a constitution that had largely been written by Páez in 1830. Páez and the conservative oligarchy were conveniently allied because the oligarchy controlled a great amount of the country's wealth but was not popular with the masses, whereas Páez was very much liked by the masses.

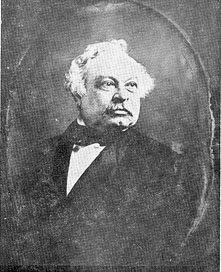
Portrait of José Antonio Páez in the middle of the 19th century

In 1842, Páez arranged to have the remains of Simón Bolívar repatriated from Santa Marta, Colombia, to the Liberator's hometown of Caracas. His funeral procession was accompanied by exuberant honors before Bolivar's remains were entombed in the Caracas Cathedral.

In 1847 President José Tadeo Monagas, who was put into power by Páez, dispersed the Congress and proclaimed himself dictator. Páez led a rebellion against him but was defeated by General Santiago Mariño in the 'Battle of the Araguatos', imprisoned, and eventually exiled in Nueva Granada and Curazao.

Páez, exiled in Curaçao, invaded Venezuela from La Vela de Coro on July 2, 1849 with the aim of overthrowing Monagas. After landing, the conservatives revolutionaries reached as far as Cojedes plains with the support of León de Febres Cordero and his son Ramón Páez. Santiago Mariño and José Gregorio Monagas surrounded Páez's forces. Juan Antonio Sotillo defeated Lorenzo Belisario and Nicasio Belisario at the Manapire Pass on July 17, had their bodies decapitated, and sent the heads to Monagas. Sotillo also defeated Felipe Macero and José Antonio Páez's rearguard was attacked at the Battle of Casupo, forcing him to capitulate in Macapo to General José Laurencio Silva. In violation of the capitulation, Páez and his men were arrested by Joaquín Herrera.

With the capture of the main leader of the conservative rebellion, the movement lost strength and ended almost entirely with the capture of Maracaibo by liberal troops. The defeated unsuccessfully requested foreign intervention. With the defeat of the conservative reaction, the First Liberal Autocracy was consolidated, which would last until the March Revolution.

Páez was exiled from the country in 1850 and did not return until 1858 to involve in the Federal War. In 1861, Páez returned to power as president and supreme dictator, but ruled for only two years before again returning to exile. During this period, Erastus D. Culver, an attorney and judge from New York, was appointed as American Minister to Venezuela in 1862. He presented himself to Páez, not realizing that the United States did not officially recognize the dictator. He and Culver established amicable relations nonetheless.

Páez lived in New York City during his years in exile. He returned in 1863, living there for another decade before his death in 1873.

== Personal life ==
Páez was married to Dominga Ortiz Orzúa, who served as First Lady of Venezuela from 1830 until 1835, and 1839 until 1843. She was First Lady again from 1861 until 1863. Páez suffered from epilepsy, even experiencing a seizure during the Battle of Carabobo in 1821.

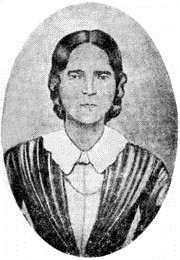
Dominga Ortiz Orzúa

== Legacy ==
He appears as a Comandante General in Sid Meier's Civilization VI, available only to users playing as the Gran Colombia civilization.

=== The Paez Medal of Arts ===
The Paez Medal of Arts is awarded by The Venezuelan American Endowment for the Arts (VAEA), presented once a year to an individual or group that has had an impact and contributed to excellence, growth, support and the proliferation of the arts in Venezuela and the United States. It is named in honor of José Antonio Páez, leader of the Independence of Venezuela, who lived in exile the last years in New York, where he became a philanthropist.

== See also ==
- Presidents of Venezuela
- List of presidents of Venezuela
- Venezuelan War of Independence

Political offices
Preceded by Office created	President of Venezuela; 13 January 1830 – 20 January 1835	Succeeded by Andrés Narvarte
Preceded by Carlos Soublette	President of Venezuela; 1 February 1839 – 28 January 1843	Succeeded by Carlos Soublette
Preceded by Pedro Gual	President of Venezuela; 29 August 1861 – 15 June 1863	Succeeded by Juan Crisóstomo Falcón
