= National Experimental University of the Armed Forces =

Public university in Venezuela

National Experimental Polytechnic University of the Armed Force
- Universidad Nacional Experimental Politécnica de la Fuerza Armada
- Motto: Educational excellence open to the people
- Type: Public
- Established: 1974
- Rector: Major General Pascualino Angiolillo Fernández, Venezuelan Army
- Students: 235,000 (May 2009)
- Location: Caracas, Venezuela
- Website: unefa.edu.ve
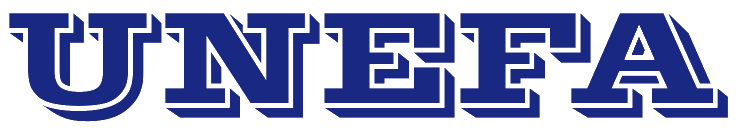

The National Experimental University of the Armed Forces (Spanish: Universidad Nacional Experimental Politécnica de la Fuerza Armada Bolivariana, UNEFA) is a Venezuelan public university associated with the Venezuelan armed forces. Founded in 1974 by the former president Rafael Caldera as the National Armed Forces Higher Polytechnical Institution (Instituto Universitario Politécnico de las Fuerzas Armadas Nacionales), it was renamed by the Venezuelan president Hugo Chavez in 1999.

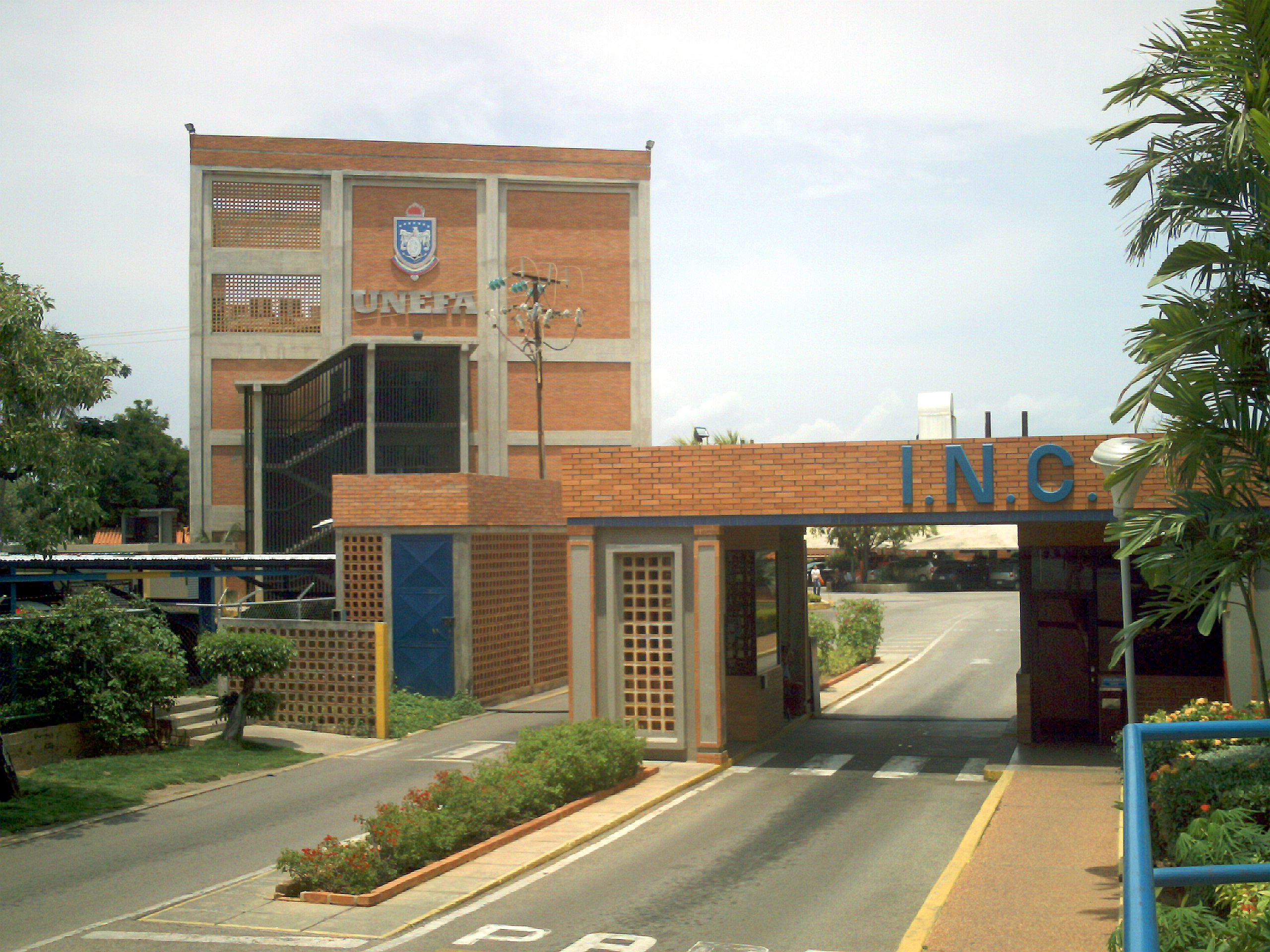
UNEFA in Zulia

In 2009 it had 61 campuses, and was present in every Venezuelan state except Monagas, with 235,000 students enrolled in May 2009.

== Notable people ==
- Keysi Sayago, Miss Venezuela 2016
- Hugo Chavez, President of Venezuela
- Naomi Soazo, judoka
- Diosdado Cabello, President of the Constituent Assembly
- Nicolás Maduro Guerra, Politician and Congressman
- Vladimir Padrino López, Minister of Defense
- José Salazar, Venezuelan

== See also ==
- Bolivarian Military University of Venezuela
- Military Academy of the Bolivarian Aviation
- Military Academy of Health Sciences
- Universidad de Oriente
- Military Academy of the Bolivarian Army
- Bolivarian Military Technical Academy
- Military Academy of the Bolivarian Navy
- National Guard Military Academy
- List of systems engineering universities
