= Pedro Tellechea =

Venezuelan military officer, politician and mechanical engineer

Minister of Industries and National Production
- In office 27 August 2024 – 18 October 2024
- President: Nicolás Maduro
- Preceded by: José Félix Rivas Alvarado
- Succeeded by: Alex Saab

Minister of Petroleum
- In office 20 March 2023 – 27 August 2024
- President: Nicolás Maduro
- Preceded by: Tareck El Aissami
- Succeeded by: Delcy Rodríguez

President of PDVSA
- In office 8 January 2023 – 27 August 2024
- President: Nicolás Maduro
- Preceded by: Asdrúbal Chávez
- Succeeded by: Héctor Obregón

President of Petroquímica de Venezuela
- In office 17 September 2020 – 31 August 2023
- President: Nicolás Maduro
- Preceded by: César Alberto Salazar
- Succeeded by: Ninoska La Concha

Personal details
- Born: 5 November 1975 (age 50) Caracas, Republic of Venezuela
- Party: United Socialist Party of Venezuela
- Education: Military Academy of Venezuela; Universidad Santa María; Military Academy of the Bolivarian Navy
- Military career
- Allegiance: Venezuela
- Branch: Venezuelan Army
- Rank: Colonel

Pedro Rafael Tellechea Ruiz (born 5 November 1975) is a Venezuelan military officer, politician, and mechanical engineer, who has held high government positions as Minister of Popular Power for Petroleum and President of Petróleos de Venezuela (PDVSA). In addition, from 2020 until 2023, he held the presidency of Petroquímica de Venezuela.

He also served as General Manager of the Mixed Company Metanol de Oriente, Metor S.A.; and President of the Venezuelan Aluminum Industry (CVG Venalum).

== Early life and education ==
He was born in the capital city of Caracas as the son of José Rafael Tellechea Oranoz. He graduated in 1992 as a high school student from the Monseñor Jáuregui Military High School in La Grita, Táchira. In 1993, he enlisted in the Military Academy of the Bolivarian Army (AMEB), where he graduated in 1998 with a degree in military science and arts in the promotion of Col. Vicente Campo Elías. Later, after several years, he achieved the rank of colonel in the Bolivarian Army of the National Bolivarian Armed Forces (FANB).

Tellechea studied a specialization in public finance at the Universidad Santa María (2002–2004) and a master's degree in naval operations in the postgraduate program of the Military Academy of the Bolivarian Navy (2005–2007). He was sent to Buenos Aires to obtain a degree in mechanical engineering with a specialization in armament at the Higher Technical School of the Argentine Army (currently General Division Nicolás Manuel Savio Army Engineering Faculty) (2008-2013). He worked for a while in the Venezuelan Anonymous Company of Military Industries (CAVIM).

== Civil and political career ==
Tellechea has held various positions in the public administration, initially in Emsoven, and later in the general management of the Mixed Company Metanol de Oriente, Metor S.A.; and the presidencies of the Venezuelan Aluminum Industry (CVG Venalum), Petroquímica de Venezuela (Pequiven) and later Petróleos de Venezuela (PDVSA). Among his actions, he appointed new management to the subsidiary company Monómeros Colombo Venezolanos S.A., based in Barranquilla, Colombia.

On January 6, 2023, he was appointed president of PDVSA, replacing Asdrúbal Chávez, according to Official Gazette No. 42.542, and initiated a general audit. On March 21, 2023, he was appointed by the government of Nicolás Maduro as the new Minister of the Ministry of Popular Power for Petroleum, a position held by Tareck El Aissami, who resigned via Twitter on the same day following accusations of "corruption and money laundering" by his workgroup. Tellechea stated that the goal for the Venezuelan petroleum industry in 2024 is to produce 1,759,000 barrels of oil per day (bpd). On August 31, 2023, he left the presidency of Pequiven, which was replaced by Ninoska La Concha.

Tellechea was appointed as minister of industry and national production and served until October 18, 2024, when he was replaced by Alex Saab. On October 21, Tellechea was arrested on suspicion of working with the United States to undermine PDVSA.
