= BMTA =

BMTA may refer to:

- Bangkok Mass Transit Authority, the main public bus operator in Bangkok, Thailand
- Benton MacKaye Trail Association, a United States-based organization
- Bolivarian Military Technical Academy, a Venezuelan military academy attached to the UMBV
