= Military Academy of Troop Officers Commander in Chief Hugo Rafael Chávez Frías =

- Academia Militar de Oficiales de Tropa Comandante en Jefe Hugo Rafael Chávez Frías
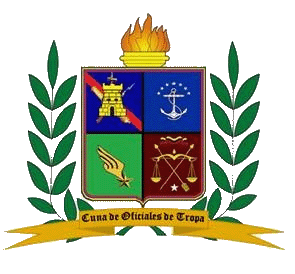
- Former name: Troop Officers Training School
- Motto: Nada Nos Detiene
- Motto in English: Home of the Troop Officers
- Type: Military
- Established: June 2012
- Parent institution: Bolivarian Military University of Venezuela
- Affiliations: Armed Forces of Venezuela
- Director: GB Jesus Rafael Calvo Araque
- Location: Santa Teresa del Tuy, Miranda State, Venezuela
- Colours: Blue (dark blue and sky blue shades)
- Website: www.cefot.blogspot.com

The Military Academy of Troop Officers Commander in Chief Hugo Rafael Chávez Frías (in Spanish Academia Militar de Oficiales de Tropa Comandante en Jefe Hugo Rafael Chávez Frías), is a military academy to train officers of the National Bolivarian Armed Forces of Venezuela within basic command echelons. It is also one of the two youngest component academies of the Bolivarian Military University of Venezuela, opened on June 1, 2012. Unlike the rest of the academies, the AMOTCH is a joint service academy, only serving experienced corporals and junior ranked NCOs with a potential to become officers of the Armed Forces. Also, up until 2019 it had a three year study term instead of the four of the other academies.

== History ==
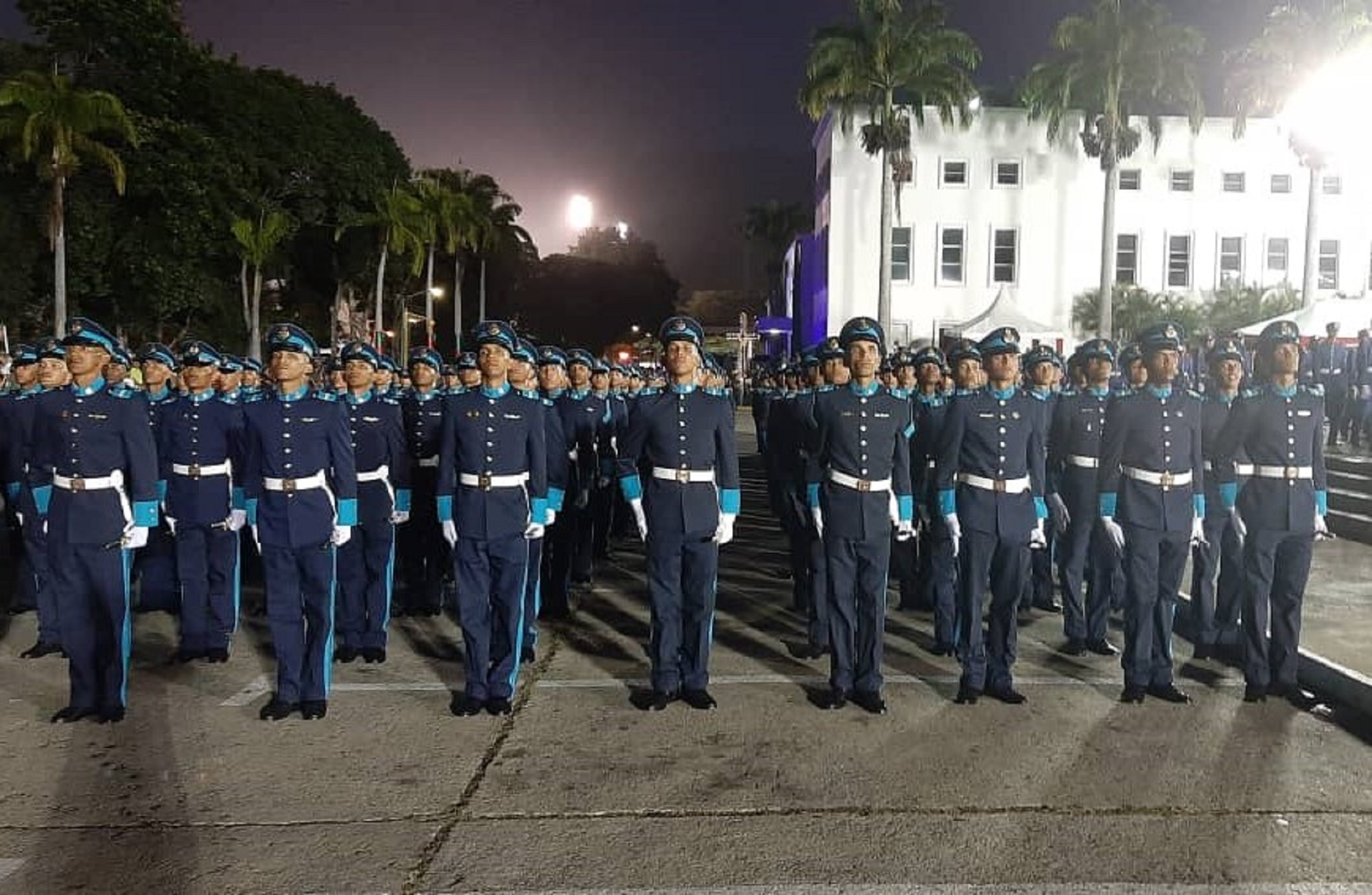
Cadets of Military Academy of Troop Officers Commander in Chief Hugo Rafael Chávez Frías

The youngest service academy in northern Latin America was established by the late President Hugo Chávez, in his duty as Commander in Chief of the National Armed Forces, thru Ministry Decree 022797 of the Ministry of Defense in June 2012 as a training institution for the commissioning of officers from the ranks of the rising number of experienced non-commissioned officers and enlisted personnel of the National Bolivarian Armed Forces of Venezuela. In 2019, the College was granted his honorific in memory of its founder.

In 2013, what was then the Troop Officers' School became the Troop Officers Academy, which moved from Fort Tiuna to its current facilities in Santa Teresa del Tuy, Miranda, which were built to house its growing student population.

== Mission statement ==
The mission of the Troop Officers Military College is:

To educate integrally with ethical values, spiritual morals and socialists, the official future that the Venezuelan society of the 21st Century requires, through a process that is humanistic, scientific, technical and interdisciplinary to accomplish tasks inherent to the functions as a commander of basic NBAF units, security missions and comprehensive defense of the Nation.

== Curriculum and academic programs ==
The MATO is a medium-sized, highly residential baccalaureate college, with a full-time, four-year undergraduate program that emphasizes instruction in the arts, sciences, and professions with no graduate program, preparing men and women who are by the time of their admission already serving as section and squad leaders in the enlisted ranks to take on the challenge of being commissioned officers at the troop (squad/detail, platoon/flight, company/troop/squadron or battalion/squadron/group) level in the NBAF. The academy is accredited by the ministry of higher education.

The academic program consists of a structured core of subjects depending on the cadet's chosen specialty as a future troop officer, balanced between the arts and sciences, plus additional emphasis in the service branch he/she will enter upon commissioning. Regardless of major, all cadets graduate with a Bachelor of Science degree.
