= Military Academy of Health Sciences =

Military medical school in Caracas, Venezuela

- Academia Militar de Medicina
- Type: Military
- Established: 2013
- Parent institution: Bolivarian Military University of Venezuela
- Affiliations: Armed Forces of Venezuela
- Location: Caracas, Venezuela
- Website: www.umbv.edu.ve/amcsb/

The Military Academy of Health Sciences (in Spanish Academia Militar de Medicina (AMMED)), is an academy to train medical sciences to the National Bolivarian Armed Forces of Venezuela (FANB).

== Mission ==
The mission of the Military Academy of Health Sciences is:

Be a top-level military academy composed of the professional and military field, health oriented training for medics, military surgeons and nurses, military excellence through scientific, humanist principals of medical education, military doctrine and efficient performance for all levels of FANB medical care; with emphasis on active participation in the development of a culture of health and comprehensive prevention.
