= Military Academy of the Bolivarian Aviation =

Military academy in Maracay, Venezuela

- Academia Militar de la Aviación Bolivariana
- Motto: La fortuna ayuda a los audaces
- Motto in English: Fortune helps the strong
- Type: Military
- Established: December 10, 1920
- Parent institution: Bolivarian Military University of Venezuela
- Affiliations: National Bolivarian Armed Forces of Venezuela
- Superintendent: BGEN Santiago Alejandro Infante Itriago
- Location: Maracay, Aragua, Venezuela
- Colors: Green and Air Force Blue
- Website: www.umbv.edu.ve/amavb/

The Military Academy of the Bolivarian Aviation (in Spanish Academia Militar de la Aviación Bolivariana), is an academy to train members of the officer corps of the Bolivarian Venezuelan Military Aviation. Based in Maracay, it has been active since 1920, and is one of the oldest air force academies ever to be established.

== Curriculum and academic programs ==
The MABAV is a medium-sized, highly residential baccalaureate college, with a full-time, four-year undergraduate program that emphasizes instruction in the arts, sciences, and professions with no graduate program, preparing men and women to take on the challenge of being officers of the Venezuelan Air Force. The academy is accredited by the Ministry of Higher Education.

=== Academic program ===
The academic program consists of a structured core of subjects depending on the cadet's chosen specialty as a future Air Force officer, balanced between the arts and sciences. Regardless of chosen major, all cadets graduate with a Bachelor of Science degree. The specialties are:

- Air Operations
- Air Defense
- Military Intelligence
- Air Logistics and Materiel
- Administration
