= Military Academy of the Bolivarian National Guard =

National Guard Military Academy
- Academia Militar de la Guardia Nacional Bolivariana
- Former name: Officer Training School of the National Guard
- Motto: En honor es su divisa
- Motto in English: Honor is its emblem
- Type: Military
- Established: September 15, 1936
- Parent institution: Bolivarian Military University of Venezuela
- Affiliations: Armed Forces of Venezuela
- Superintendent: BGEN Winder González Urdaneta
- Commandant of Cadets: Colonel Jonas Paez
- Location: Caracas, Venezuela
- Colors: Maroon
- Nickname: House of the Knights of Honor
- Website: www.umbv.edu.ve/amgnb/

The National Guard Military Academy (in Spanish Academia Militar de la Guardia Nacional Bolivariana), opened in 1936, is a military academy training future officers of the Venezuelan National Guard. It shares its campus in Caracas's Fort Tiuna with the Military Academy of the Bolivarian Army.

== Mission ==
The missions of the Military Academy of the National Guard are the following:

- Love of country, duty, ethical, moral, spiritual and historical values of Venezuelan society.
- Leaders possessing a high level of performance as the official future.
- To fulfill tasks related to the National Guard, military defense cooperation, maintaining internal order and actively participate in the development of the nation.

== Vision Statement ==
The Academy is envisioned to be:

A military higher educational institution of national and international prestige, that is oriented towards the training of the officers with moral and ethnic values, shaped by a process of investigation training that is excellent and effective, that is aimed towards the defense and compliance with the provisions of the Constitution of the Bolivarian Republic of Venezuela, the law, and human rights.

== Curriculum and academic programs ==
The NGMA is a medium-sized, highly residential baccalaureate college, with a full-time, four-year undergraduate program that emphasizes instruction in the arts, sciences, and professions with no graduate program, preparing men and women to take on the challenge of being commissioned officers of the Venezuelan National Guard. The academy is accredited by the Ministry of Higher Education.

=== Academic program ===
The academic program consists of a structured core of subjects depending on the cadet's chosen specialty as a future National Guard officer, balanced between the arts and sciences, plus additional emphasis in law enforcement. Regardless of major, all cadets graduate with a Bachelor of Science degree.

=== Military curriculum ===
As all cadets are commissioned as second lieutenants upon graduation, military and leadership education is nested with academic instruction. Military training and discipline fall under the purview of the Office of the Commandant of Cadets. Entering freshmen, or 4th class cadets, are referred to as New Cadets, and enter the academy on Reception Day (in September or October ) to start off their military service training as future officers in Fort Tiuna, and are recognized as full cadets in a ceremony in November. The 2nd, 3rd and 4th years of study, aside from the usual academic work, also involve specialty training in the specialty branches of the National Guard in their respective branch training schools, public relations activities and advanced training in law enforcement. Selected cadets are also selected for foreign exchange studies in the military and police academies of Belarus, Bolivia, Nicaragua and Argentina.

The Academy also has links with military and police academies in Latin America and thus also has a sizable number of foreign exchange cadets who graduate as Second Lieutenants or equivalents and with a bachelor's degree and thus return to their countries of origin to serve in their police forces.

As the Corps of Cadets is structured into a Regiment, command of the Battalions and Companies fall under the responsibility of active duty officers in the rank of captain or major, unlike the academies in the US and UK and therefore following Prussian practice. There is also one senior Non-Commissioned Officer who acts as an assistant.
