= Bolivarian National Armed Forces of Venezuela =

Combined military forces of Venezuela

Bolivarian National Armed Forces
- Fuerza Armada Nacional Bolivariana
- Founded: 19 April 1810 (216 years, 215 days)
- Current form: December 1999
- Service branches: Army; Navy; Military Aviation; National Guard; Militia; Strategic Operations Command

Leadership
- Commander-in-Chief: Delcy Rodríguez
- Minister of Defense: General-in-chief Gustavo Enrique González López

Personnel
- Conscription: 18–30 years of age 30 month term
- Active personnel: 109,000 (2020); 220,000 paramilitary (2018)
- Reserve personnel: 8,000 (2018)

Expenditure
- Budget: $741 million (2017)
- Percent of GDP: 0.35% (2017)

Industry
- Domestic suppliers: CAVIM; CENARECA; MAZVEN; DIANCA; UCOCAR; G&F Tecnología
- Foreign suppliers: Current: Belarus; China; North Korea; Cuba; Iran; Russia; Serbia; Former: Austria; Belgium; Bolivia; Brazil; Canada; France; Germany; Italy; Israel; Poland; Japan; South Korea; Netherlands; Sweden; United Kingdom; United States

Related articles
- History: Venezuelan War of Independence; Federal War; United States–Venezuela conflict
- Ranks: Venezuelan military ranks

The Bolivarian National Armed Forces (Spanish: Fuerza Armada Nacional Bolivariana - FANB) (Spanish pronunciation: [famˈbe]) is the combined military force of Venezuela. It is controlled by the Commander-in-Chief (the president) and the Minister of Defense. In addition to the army, navy, and air force there is also a National Guard and Militia primarily focused on internal security.

The armed forces primary purpose is to defend Venezuelan territory from attack, combat drug trafficking, provide search and rescue capabilities, aid the civilian population in case of natural disasters protection, as well as numerous internal security assignments. As of 2018, the armed forces had around 123,000 active personnel and 8,000 reservists.

== History ==
=== Independence era ===
The origin of an organized and professional armed forces in Venezuela dates to the Spanish troops quartered in the former Province of Venezuela in the 18th century. Politically and militarily until the creation of the Captaincy General of Venezuela in 1777, the Province of Venezuela depended on the Real Audiencia of Santo Domingo (in today's Dominican Republic) or the Viceroyalty of New Granada (today, Colombia) for the defense of the area. In 1732 the Spanish crown created a Military Directorate and established a number of battalions, and had a few units from infantry regiments based in Spain arrive in the area. Reform of the military in the colonies began a few decades later.

In 1751, the first squadrons of cavalry arrived from Spain. The first batteries of Artillery were officially raised just two years later. Both Criollos and pardos were allowed to enter the ranks of the artillery companies. That same year, a Fixed Caracas Battalion was established. Until the creation of this battalion, defense had been based on small colonial militia companies initially organised according to colonial racial categories.

It was from these units that the bulk of the officers who fought in the battles of the Venezuelan War of Independence emerged. Among them were Generalissimo Francisco de Miranda, Simón Bolívar (Bolívar's own father had been Colonel of the Militia of Aragua), General in chief Santiago Mariño, Rafael Urdaneta, among many other heroes. With the establishment of an independent captaincy general in the latter half of the 18th century, the Spanish troops quartered in the province passed to the direct command of Caracas.

The troops in the other provinces of the country, under the command of local governors, were overseen by the Captain General of Caracas, who served as commander in chief of the armed services. In this way a series of autonomous units was created for the peoples of the area and for defense duties, open to all fit males regardless of color. Aside from these the Spanish Navy also operated naval bases in the Captaincy General's territorial coastline, open to both whites and blacks as well.

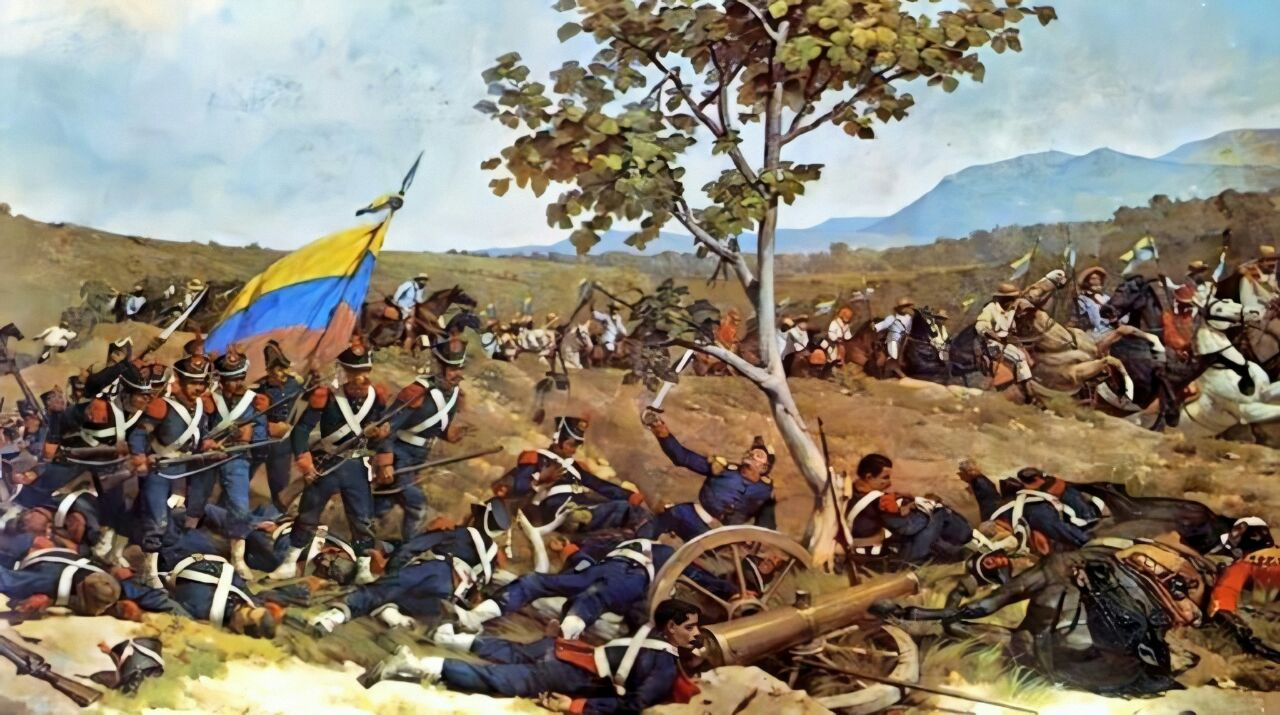
The Battle of Carabobo, 1821

Already in the early 19th century, many of these Venezuelans who had formed the bulk of the officer corps at the start of the formation of the national armed forces began to arrive in the country after participating in military campaigns abroad in the American Revolutionary War, the French Revolution, or after completing their studies in Europe. With them came a number of mercenaries and volunteers of many different nationalities: English, Scottish, Irish, French, German, Brazilian, Poles, Russians, and others.

In 1810, the process of raising the national armed services began in the aftermath of the 19 April coup d'état. Several of the military officers of the colonial military forces supported the coup and the subsequent creation of a junta. That Supreme Junta later appointed Commander Lino de Clemente to be in charge of defense affairs for the Captaincy General, and thus the armed forces began to be formed through their efforts, including the opening of a full military academy in Caracas for the training of officers, later joined by a naval academy in La Guaira for naval officer education the following year.

It could be said that in the first two decades of the 19th century, the nascent Liberation Army and Navy, was in the midst of the intellectual training of their military cadres, in various attempts to unleash the revolutionary war, and trying to build a modern army and navy. In the midst of that task came the generalissimo Francisco de Miranda, and the Liberator Simón Bolívar, who called for immediate action to, once and for all, ensure the independence of the nation, achieved through the aforementioned 19 April coup of 1810 and later through the formal enactment of the 1811 Venezuelan Declaration of Independence.

Bolívar surprised his military colleagues, when he rejected part of the Napoleonic military assumptions, habits and behaviors, took more British soldiers and those from other nations, and even through third parties requested the assistance of the British Crown for the formation of the regular army and navy for the growing republic. The 19th century, ultimately, was dominated by British and Prussian military influences. Once in battle, Bolívar began to develop his own tactics, military strategies and practices, whose legacy remains till this day in the National Armed Forces, and led to victory after victory and the full liberation of not just Venezuela, but of northern South America, through battles in both land and sea until the wars ended in 1824.

=== Military rule ===
During the second half of the 19th century, a school for officers continued (Military Academy of Mathematics, which was decades in advance of the policy of unification of arms and services of the Spanish military academy, which was in fact after to the Venezuelan one), a standing Army, weapons, and creating new services including the Corps of Sappers. This phase of the Venezuelan Army, is marked by infighting and a domain of local militias with no training (the Federal War was one example). The little outside help in military matters at this stage is limited to the British and the later Chilean military missions, which began the long modernization of the army and navy. The military figures (there were other political figures) of the armed forces who were the most important at this stage were Marshal Juan Crisóstomo Falcón, General in Chief Cipriano Castro, Brigadier General Ezequiel Zamora and Manuel Ezequiel Bruzual.

Already in the first half of the 20th century, President General in Chief Juan Vicente Gómez, who originally based on the plans of General in Chief Cipriano Castro, began a thorough modernization in the armed services, but does not create a new army as some historians point out. This modernization was done with the help of instructors and advisers from Chile, France, Italy and Germany. The late Prussian influence did not reach the Venezuelan Army from the Germans, but from the Chilean military instructors in 1910. One of the most important reforms undertaken during the Gómez regime of the National Armed Forces, which began in 1910 with the aim of making the national armed services uniform, modern and technically advanced in this era of the 20th century.

The reform coincided with the centennial anniversary of the Venezuelan Declaration of Independence, which contributed to the doctrinal and political cohesion of the army and the navy. The most important milestones of this reform were:

In 1910, operation of the Military Academy of Venezuela that was reformed in 1903 started, and within it, the Naval Academy (then called Naval School of Venezuela), establishing the School of Application for Military officers in active service with the aim of upgrading their military expertise. In 1913 the Superior Technical Office responsible for the development of military doctrine, organization and training of the army, was founded.

In 1920 the Military Aviation School of Venezuela was established. It was located in Maracay and was inaugurated the first of January of the next year to train the nation's military pilots.

In 1923/1930 a new Code of Military law was adopted that superseded all previous military laws and responded to the new political and military situation in the country. This process was accompanied by the modernization of the infrastructure, provision of arms, equipment, uniforms and a sustained growth of the military budget, which was made possible by oil revenues. The reform had a strong German influence. This is due mainly to the fact the Prussian/German army was the most modern of the era and in this sense become a model internationally.

The most important political consequence of this reform, from 1913, was a sense of the rising political power of the Venezuelan military while retaining its traditional role as the defense forces of the State. Since 1914 Gomez always retained the post of Commanding General of the Army, even when not holding the presidency of the Republic. The power base of support of the regime after 1913, apart from the liberals and nationalists, was the armed forces, which became an essential element of repression to ensure public order and national progress.

At this stage the military and political figures more relevant, apart from general Gómez, were General in Chief Eleazar López Contreras (who founded the National Guard in 1937) and Major General Isaías Medina Angarita, both Presidents of the Republic. With Angarita's ouster in 1945, civilians took over the government for the first time since 1922, albeit only briefly, but it was during those times that the Venezuelan Air Force was officially founded. The ouster of Angarita saw the participation of what is now today the 411th Armored Battalion "General in Chief Juan Francisco Bermudez", whose M3 Stuart light tanks and Jeeps saw action, and which foresaw the beginning of the modernization of the armed services.

The second half of the 20th century, was just as turbulent for the entire Venezuelan military, but it was projected into the future as a modern force for the coming years, though not yet cohesive. Already under the government of Major General Marcos Pérez Jiménez, who led the country as president and Commander in Chief from the early 1950s to 1958 (he was, under LTCOL Carlos Delgado Chalbaud and Germán Suárez Flamerich, the Minister of Defense) and the American influence (cultural, political and military), which started with the 1944 arrival of the first US military mission, became more prominent than in the entire history of the armed forces.

So jealous of the Venezuelan Army, over the subsequent decades, the armed forces kept a precarious existing French influence, as a balance to the overwhelming American influence in the armed forces. Between the years 1945 and 1952, there was a major program of military equipment purchases almost monopolized by the United States (although other military material was acquired from other countries, mostly NATO countries) plus the military missions sent by that country, and later repeated again in the early years of the decade of the 1970s, albeit in a more balanced way by their countries of origin.

=== Fourth Republic government ===
At this time, the armed forces were composed of the traditional air force, army, navy and national guard.

The armed services made their mark in the 1960s by stopping anti-government actions and two rebellions from within its ranks. The 1970s were marked with the Carabobo Reorganizational Plan, aimed to enhance the capability of the Army and marked an increase of regular army units and materiel. The Air Force, Navy and National Guard increased their capabilities as well with modern equipment to satisfy all those who serve. Born again under a turbulent internal and external picture for the nation is the modern National Bolivarian Armed Forces, in the midst of the economic crises of the 1980s and the subsequent military coups of the early 1990s.

=== Bolivarian government ===
Under the governments of Hugo Chávez and his successor Nicolás Maduro, the armed forces have undergone significant changes. Their name was changed from the National Armed Forces, to the National Bolivarian Armed Forces. There was a change in international partnerships, switching from cooperation with the United States and its allies, to expanded cooperation with Russia.

== Doctrine ==
The military doctrine of the armed forces today is based on policy laid out by the late Hugo Chávez, the President and Commander in Chief from 1999 to 2013. According to Chávez's policy, the military would also follow defense principles of a "people's war of resistance" against the enemies of the republic and to assist in "internal order," as well as participate in government economic development plans and programs for the benefit of the people of Venezuela.

=== Mission statement ===
According to the Article 3 of the Armed Forces Organic Law, the fundamental mission of the National Bolivarian Armed Forces is to ensure the independence and sovereignty of the nation and ensure the integrity of the geographical territories of the country, by means of military defense, cooperation in the maintenance of internal order and active participation in national development.

== Organization and structure ==
The President of Venezuela is the commander-in-chief of the armed forces under constitutional provisions, thus he has overall supervision and control over it. He also appoints the Minister of Defense, the commandant of the Operational Strategic Command and the commanding generals of the service branches and has full authority over all uniformed personnel. In doing this, he is assisted by the Commander-in-Chief's General Staff.

=== Ministry of Defense ===
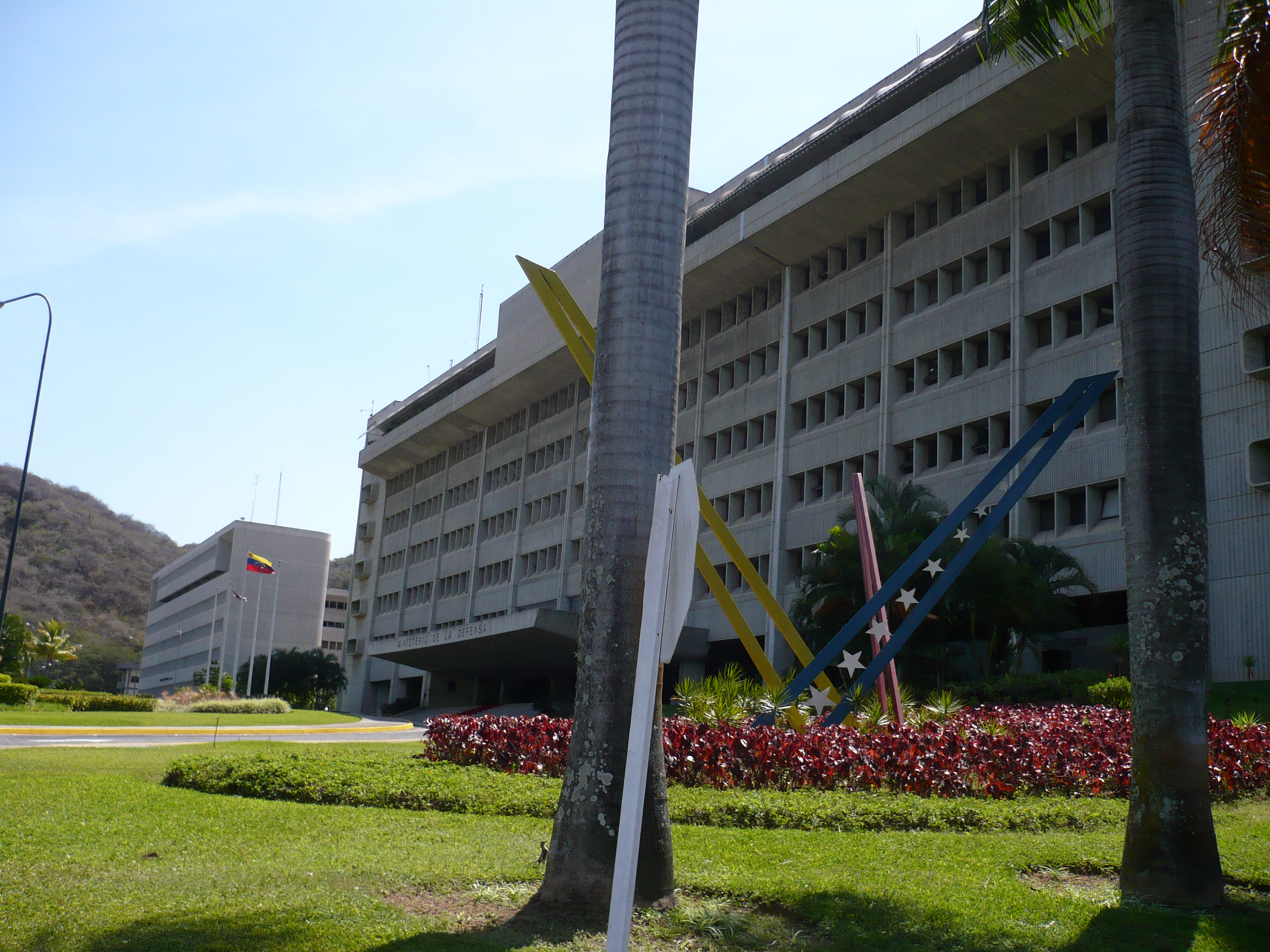
The Ministry of Defense in Caracas, Venezuela

The Venezuelan Ministry of the People's Power for Defense is the federal-level organ responsible for maintaining the Venezuelan armed forces. As of November 2014, this ministry is headed by General Vladimir Padrino Lopez, who replaced Admiral Carmen Meléndez who was appointed Venezuela's first woman minister of interior. The ministry coordinates numerous counter-narcotics operations, organizes various civil protection measures and operations, and generally oversees the conventional military capabilities of Venezuela. The office of minister is filled by a general or flag officer of the armed forces with the rank of general or admiral in chief (which is the only officer who holds this rank in the armed forces).

=== High Command Authorities and National Armed Forces Council ===
The president is assisted by the Military High Command of the Bolivarian Republic of Venezuela, which consists of the Minister of Defense, the Chief of Inspectorate General for Defense, the Commandant of the Operational Strategic Command, the Commanding General of the Army, the Commanding General of the Navy, the Commanding General of the Air Force, the Commanding General of the National Guard, and the Commanding General of the National Militia General Command (AFOL Art. 42).

The National Armed Forces High Council is made by the Military High Command. It is the principal organ for consultation and advice of the President of the Republic, of the National Defense Council and Minister of Defense, on issues of organization, operation, development and employment of the Armed Forces, either in peacetime or in state of emergency.

Per the 2014 amendments to the Armed Forces Organic Law, the Joint Chiefs of Staff of the OSC is now renamed as the National Armed Forces Senior General Staff Authority, and now has been expanded, led by the Minister of Defense and the Commandant of the OSC, and assisted by the Assistant Commandant and Chairman of the Joint Chiefs of Staff, service branch commanding generals, commanding generals of the Integral Strategic Defense Regions, and a secretary general of the HCA.

=== Other decentralised directorates ===
Abbreviation	Full Name (English)	Full Name (Spanish)	Current office holder
VICEDUDEF	Deputy Minister of Education for National Defense	Vice-Ministerio de Educación para la Defensa	
VICESERV	Deputy Minister of Defense Services	Vice-Ministerio de Servicios de la Defensa	
VICEPLANDES	Deputy Minister of Defense Development and Planning	Vice-Ministerio de Planification y Desarollo de la Defensa	
INGEFANB	Office of the Inspector General of the National Armed Forces	Inspectoría General de la Fuerza Armada Nacional	
CONGEFANB	Office of the Comptroller General of the National Armed Forces	Contraloría General de la Fuerza Armada Nacional	
SECODENA	Secretariat Office of the National Defense Council	Secretaría del Consejo de Defensa de la Nación	
CCSEDE	Commission for Defense Sector Contracts	Comisión de Contrataciones del Sector Defensa	
DAEX	Directorate-General for Weapons and Explosives	Dirección General de Armas y Explosivos	

=== Operational Strategic Command ===
The Operational Strategic Command (CEOFAN) is the highest organ of command of the National Armed Forces. It was created by the current Article 60 of the Organic Law of the National Armed Forces (LOFAN) as amended in September 2005. It reports to both the President and to the Minister of Defense and is responsible for coordinating the action of military units belonging to the different service branches of the Armed Forces. The Commandant may or may not be also a concurrently serving Minister of Defense in some cases.

The military regions are subordinate to the OSC, NBAF, alongside the air defense units of the Army, Air Force and Navy under the banner of the OSC Air Defense Forces Command, albeit being commanded by an Air Force general officer, as of 2017 Division General Juan Manuel Diaz.

=== Military regions ===
The Integral Strategic Defense Regions or ISDRs (REDI, Regiones Estrategicas de Defensa Integral) were activated in September 2008, in compliance with the provisions of the amended Organic Law of the National Armed Forces. Equivalent to a military district, these regional commands are mandated to serve the defense, social and economic needs of their respective areas of responsibility. These are divided into the Integral Defense Operations Zones or INDOZ (In Spanish, Zona Operativa del Defensa Integral or ZODI) subdivided into state commands (State Integral Defense Operations Zones or STINDOZ) and in the Maritime Region, 4 Maritime and Insular Integral Defense Operations Zones (MAIINDOZ), created in July 2015.

A new region, the National Capital Region Command, was created in July 2016.

All of these are led by officers of Lieutenant General or Vice Admiral rank.

Short name	Name	States	General/Flag Officer Commanding (as of present)
REDI Capital	National Capital Integral Strategic Defense Region	Vargas, Miranda, Capital District. (Compatible to the National Capital Region of the United States Armed Forces and the United States Department of Defense, the United States Army Military District of Washington and the London District (British Army).)	
REDI Central	Central Integral Strategic Defense Region	Aragua, Carabobo and Yaracuy.	
REDI Occidental	Western Integral Strategic Defense Region	Falcón, Lara and Trujillo.	
REDI Los Llanos	Plains Integral Strategic Defense Region	Apure, Portuguesa, Barinas, Guarico and Cojedes.	
REDI Oriental	Eastern Integral Strategic Defense Region	Anzoátegui, Monagas and Sucre.	
REDI Guayana	Guyana Integral Strategic Defense Region	Bolivar and Amazonas.	
REDI Marítima e Insular	Maritime and Insular Integral Strategic Defense Region	Delta Amacuro, Nueva Esparta and Miranda Insular Territory plus the Federal Dependencies, with additional responsibility over the territorial waters of Venezuela.	
REDI Los Andes	Andes Integral Strategic Defense Region	Mérida, Tachira and Zulia.	

== Service branches ==
The armed forces is divided into six service branches, the Army, Navy, Air Force, National Guard, National Reserve and the Territorial Guard. The Army, Navy, Air Force and National Guard serve under the Strategic Operational Command (Comando Estratégico Operacional). The National Reserve and the Territorial Guard serve under the National Militia General Command (Comando General de la Milicia Nacional).

=== Main branches ===
==== Army ====
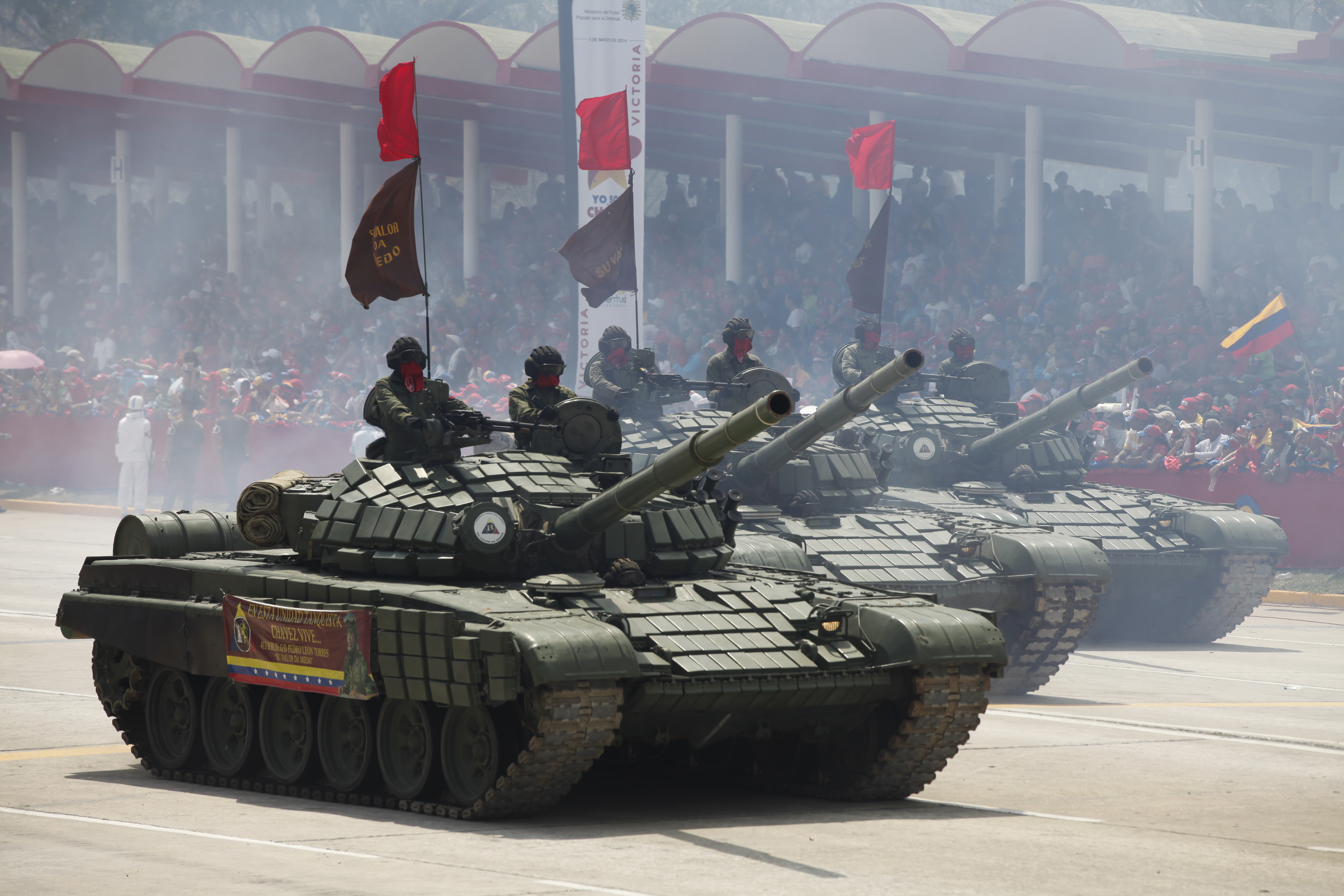
A T-72B1Vs of the Venezuelan Army during a commemoration parade of Hugo Chávez in 2014

The Venezuelan Army (Fuerzas Terrestres or Ejército), has roughly 63,000 troops, including conscripts. Its main function is planning, implementing and monitoring terrestrial military operations in coordination with the other components of the national armed forces, in pursuit of the Integrated National Defense mission.

It is organized in six operating divisions plus the other components: the Army Aviation Command, 6th Corps of Engineers, Army Logistics Command, and Army Education Command. It is composed of armored units, infantry, engineers, special forces and artillery, with resources that allow it to perform airlift operations. It is the largest military branch of Venezuela's armed forces. Its commanding general is Major General Juan de Jesús García Toussaintt.

==== Navy ====
The Venezuelan Navy (Fuerzas Navales or Armada Bolivariana) and Marines (Infanteria de Marina) primary mission is to implement, manage and control naval operations, naval aircraft, and the Coast Guard in support of Navy activities to ensure the execution of plans of employment.

The staff is estimated at 30,000 personnel, including 12,000 Marines and 600 personnel from the Naval Aviation. There are five major commands: Naval Logistics Command, Naval Personnel Command, Naval Education and Training Command and the Naval Operations Command, which in turn is composed of the following commands: Fleet Forces Command, Riverline Command, Naval Aviation Command, Coast Guard Command and the Marine Division.

Operationally, Venezuela is divided into two Naval zones. The Western Naval Zone (HQ: Punto Fijo), and the Eastern Naval Area (HQ: Carupano), that covers the Atlantic coast. The activation of the projected areas: Central Naval Area (HQ: Puerto Cabello), Atlantic (HQ: Güiria) and South (HQ: Caicara Orinoco) is in the planning stages.

Navy Day is celebrated on the date of Simon Bolivar's birthday, 24 July, the day of the final battle of the Venezuelan War of Independence, the Battle of Lake Maracaibo, in 1823. The Commanding General of the Navy in 2015 was Admiral Franklin Montplaisier.

==== Air Force ====
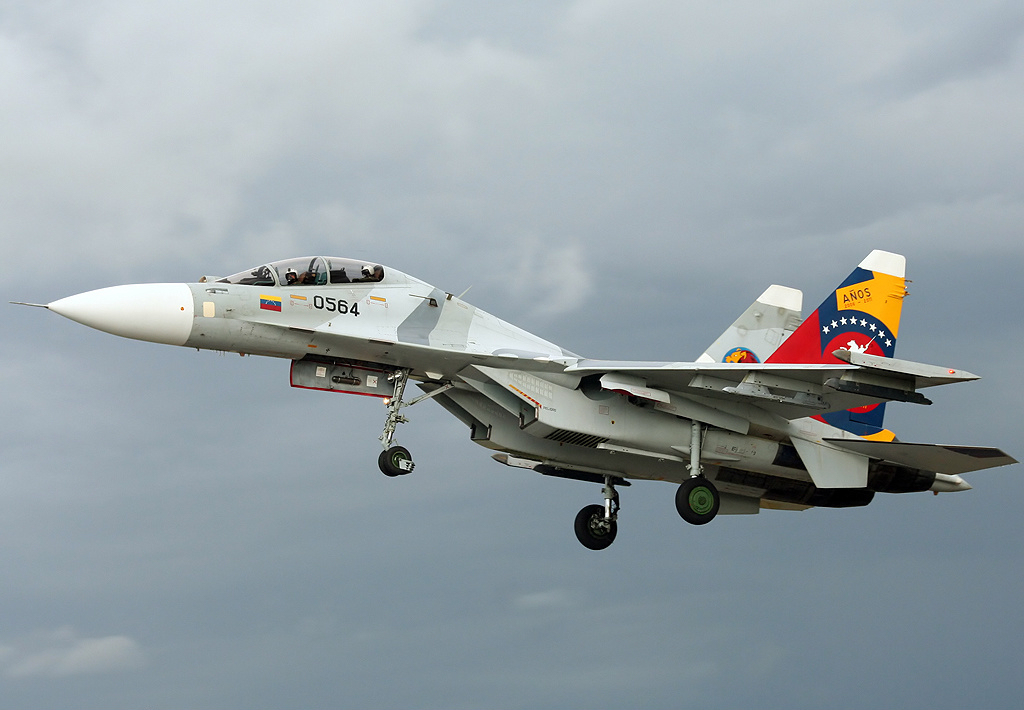
A Sukhoi Su-30MKV.

In 1946, the Venezuelan Air Force was founded through the merger of the army and navy aviation wings. The Air Force (Fuerzas Aérea or Aviación Militar) has the following commands: Air Operations Command (with thirteen Air Groups, consisting of squadrons of transport aircraft, helicopters, fighter and attack aircraft and training aircraft), the Air Defense Forces Command, the Airborne Command, the Air Logistics Command, the Air Personnel Command, including the Air Force Police and the Air Force Corps of Engineers, and the Air Education and Training Command, including the Air Force Academy, Air Personnel Training School, and the Air Power College.

Its main objective is to protect the airspace of Venezuela in coordination with the other components of the National Armed Forces. In 2007, the Air Force was renamed as the Bolivarian National Military Air Force of Venezuela and has gone into an expansion and modernization program. The Commanding General of the Venezuelan Air Force, as of July 2015, is Major General Edgar Valentín Cruz Arteaga.

==== National Guard ====
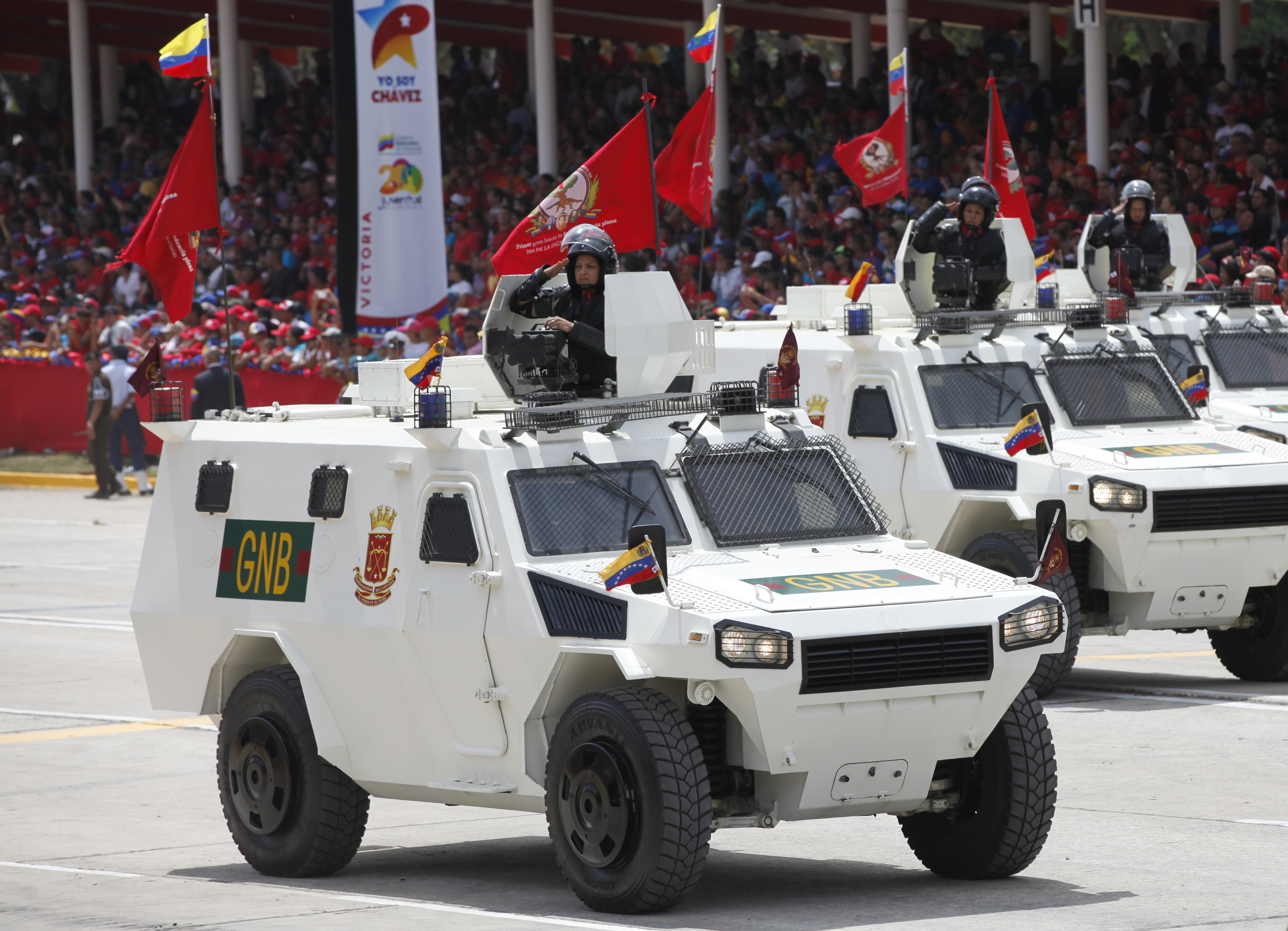
A VN-4 of the Venezuelan National Guard.

The National Guard of Venezuela (Fuerzas Armadas de Cooperacion or Guardia Nacional), according to the Constitution of the Bolivarian Republic of Venezuela, is a military corps with police functions. With roughly 23,000 troops, its organized into 9 regional commands (division size) and 24 state level zone commands (brigade sized), with plans to expand that number to fifteen commands.

There is the Coastal Surveillance Command, the Air Support Command, the Corps of Engineers, the Logistics Support Command, the National Guard Command School and the National Guard Academy and the various other institutions under its Education Command. It is planned to structure the National Guard in divisions, under the command of the Territorial Commands.

In 2007, the National Guard was renamed as the Bolivarian National Guard of Venezuela, and was expanded even further to include the People's Guards Command in 2011 and the Anti-extortion and Sequestration Command in 2013, with a Social Action Division in the planning stage as of present. The Commanding General of the National Guard is Major General Nestor Luis Reverol Torres.

=== Other branches ===
==== National Militia ====
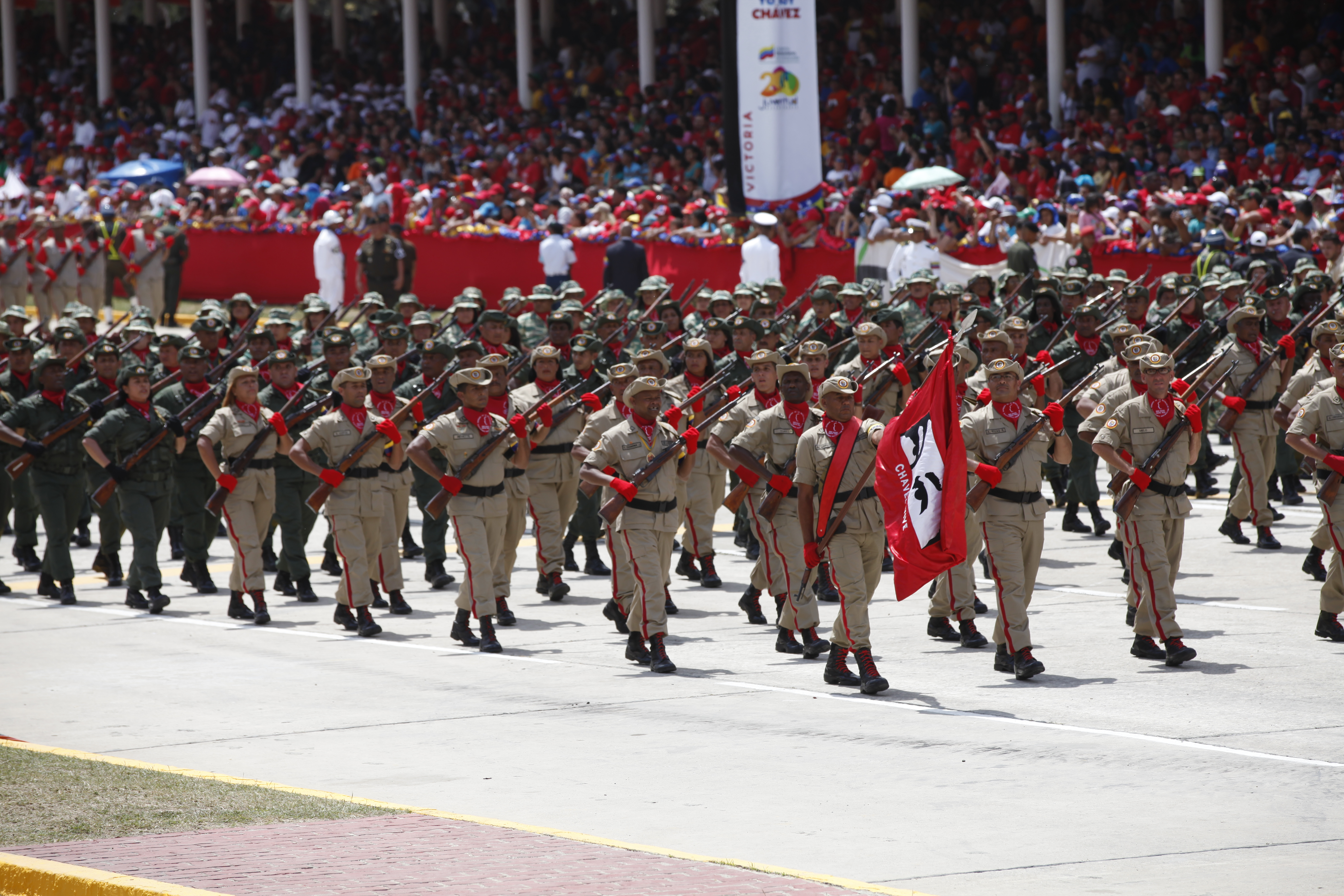
Venezuelan National Militia in Caracas, Venezuela on 5 March 2014 during the commemoration of Hugo Chávez's death.

The Venezuelan militia traces its origins to both the long struggle against Spanish rule by the indigenous peoples of Venezuela and the militia battalions raised in the 18th century during the Spanish era, that later formed the basis of the armed forces upon the independence of the nation, and two militiamen from that period, Jose Maria España and Manuel Gual, began the long road towards national independence with their failed revolt of 1797.

In the 21st century, the militias were revived as a full branch of the armed services of Venezuela. They were formed on the basis of the reserve commands of the National Armed Forces, first as the Armed Reserve Forces, then as the National Reserve and Mobilization Command, and from 2008, as the National Bolivarian Militia.

Today the General Command of the National Boliviarian Militia is divided into two major commands:

1. The National Reserve Service, consisting of all Venezuelan citizens who are either not in active military service, have completed their military service, or serve voluntarily in the military reserve.

2. The Territorial Guard Component, consisting of all Venezuelan citizens who voluntarily serve to organize local resistance to any external threat to national independence in all levels of society.

A third component, the People's Navy Branch, created in 2013, serves as a naval militia component composed of volunteer national servicemen and women contributing to the defense of the nation's maritime waters and coastline. It is itself divided into the Naval Reserve (part of the NRS) and the Workers' Naval Employment Territorial Militias, part of the TGC.

The National Militia is organized into nine Reserve brigades, present throughout the national territory, dozens of Special Resistance Corps (grouped around workers contingents of state and private enterprises and federal, state, city and township government institutions) and territorial militia units nationwide, plus a newly created national guards brigade. It is an autonomous and auxiliary force for the Armed Forces' service branches, with its own chain of command and service arms, reporting directly to the President, the Minister of Defense and the Operational Strategic Command.

It can be estimated at the present time about 400,000 men and women are on various training levels, but the target of its authorities is to reach 1,100,000 part-time national servicemen and women, including a newly raised youth cadet arm for university students and a women's militia component. As of 2021, the National Militia is a 3 million strong force of male and female reservists and part-time national service personnel. And as part of its expansion the National Militia has been active in training exercises with the other service branches in preparation for the duties of national wartime defense.

In honor of the reservists' honorable service during 13 April 2002 coup d'état in defense of the presidency, armed forces and the people, that day, which also honors its formal foundation, is celebrated yearly as National Militia Day. Until 2009 this was celebrated on 4 February.

The commanding general of the National Militia is Major General Manuel Bernal Martínez, Venezuelan Army.

==== Presidential Honor Guard ====
The Presidential Honor Guard Brigade is the joint service military unit mandated to ensure the immediate security of the President of the Bolivarian Republic of Venezuela and his First Family and for the performance of public duties in the most important places in the country. The most distant antecedents of the Presidential Honor Guard go back to the Hussars Troop of Bolivar, of the Venezuelan War of Independence and of the larger Spanish American wars of independence, raised in June 1815 and part of a more bigger guards brigade targeted for the immediate security of the Liberator, and the early 20th century 1st Cavalry Regiment "Ambrosio Plaza" that until the 1950s, albeit reduced to squadron size, provided the ceremonial security of the President and was modeled on the Prussian practices of the late 19th century.

The Presidential Honor Guard Brigade is composed today by the personnel from both the five service components of the National Armed Forces and the civil security services, and is commanded by a brigadier general or colonel or equivalent. It is a brigade sized unit. The Brigade provides the honor guard to the President in State Arrival Ceremonies at the Miraflores Palace and to the President in every activity held in the grounds and at the Tomb of the Unknown Soldier in Carabobo Field, Valencia Municipality, Carabobo, in honor of its participation in one of the final two battles of the Venezuelan War of Independence, the Battle of Carabobo on 24 June 1821, fought at the very grounds where the tomb is located, where a Guard Mounting ceremony is held daily in the midday hours. From 2013 onward the Brigade is also charged with mounting the guard at the tomb of the late President Hugo Chávez at Fort Montana in Caracas plus in Bolivar's renovated mausoleum in the National Pantheon of Venezuela complex, also in Caracas, with guard mounting duties done daily, with all of them open to the public.

The dress uniform used by the Presidential Honor Guards mirrors the uniform of Bolivar's Hussar Troop during the Venezuelan War of Independence: red short jacket polo with black trousers or pants with sabre and scabbard, long black belt, black boots and a busby hat. The Mounted Platoon wears the Sabretache with the dress uniform when mounted in appropriate occasions like military parades. In both cases the brigade personnel carry sabres and lances with the full dress uniform (only the color guard carries rifles). Red berets with the distinctive unit insignia are worn with the service dress green and combat dress uniforms except by personnel from the Venezuelan Air Force who are part of the brigade.

The Commanding General of the Presidential Honor Guard Brigade (as of 20 January 2014) is Brigadier General Jesus Rafael Salazar Velasquez.

==== Military Intelligence ====
The general directorate of military intelligence (Dirección General de Inteligencia Militar, DGIM), is the bureau in charge to collect all the strategic intelligence data, and to coordinate the diverse institutions or departments of military intelligence of the service components of National Armed Forces and the National Militia.

The chief of the general directorate is Brigadier General Ivan Hernandez Darlan as of 20 January 2014.

== Budget ==
According to the law of the approved budget for the 2012 Fiscal year, the budget allocated to the defense sector, is US$4.959 billion, which represents 6.5% of Venezuela's gross domestic product (GDP). Another source indicates that the amount is $4.508 billion. This amount does not include the additional credit granted by the Russian Federation of $4 billion, half of which will be used in fiscal year 2012, and the other half in fiscal year 2013, which would bring the official FY2012 total to $6.5 billion. The Bolivarian government increased salaries annually for members of the armed forces with a 505% increase in pay between 1999 and 2014.

Venezuela's continued economic collapse has drastically curtailed, among other things, its military spending. According to the Stockholm International Research Institute, a research body whose data is used by the World Bank, Venezuela's military spending has been plummeting rapidly since 2012. Military spending was only $2.3 billion in 2016. This is a minuscule number compared to even Peru's military spending (listed at $2.6 billion), despite Venezuela having several times as many men under arms as Peru.

== Military justice ==
According to the article 76 of the Organic Law of the National Armed Force, the system of military justice consists of

- The Military Criminal Judicial Circuit
- The Military Prosecutor
- The Military Advocacy
- Auxiliary and research bodies

Article 77 of the same Act specifies the support logistics and financial of the same: the Ministry of defence will provide the human, financial, material and technical resources for its proper functioning. Likewise, will seek the administrative and financial autonomy of each of the members of the system of military justice.

== Personnel ==
All men and women that are citizens of Venezuela have a constitutional duty to register for military service at the age of 18, which is the age of majority in Venezuela.

=== Requirements for military service ===
- Be a natural-born Venezuelan
- Be between eighteen and thirty (30) years of age for men, twenty-five (25) years of age for women
- Be unmarried; and for women not to have children.
- Not having a case in court.
- Possess proper identification cards
- Not be disabled physically.
- Not having a criminal record.
- Not consuming any alcoholic beverage.

=== Military education ===
The military educational system, according to the concept of military strategy of the National Armed Forces, has a mission to educate, train and develop professionals pro-active, responsible, aware of the commitment with the defense in depth and its participated actively in the development of the country, achieving a comprehensive and interdisciplinary training that enable them to interact with the management of public or private; the education system will be geared towards a sound humanistic, scientific, research and spiritual culture that promotes leadership and educational self-management, development of competences, which facilitates the adaptation of their knowledge to the continuous transformation of science and technology, with emphasis on the observance and respect of human rights and international humanitarian law.

==== Bolivarian Military University of Venezuela ====
The Bolivarian Military University of Venezuela (Universidad Militar Bolivariana de Venezuela, UMBV), was created by initiative of the National Federal Government, through the efforts of the late President Hugo Chávez, with the firm intention to promote a strategic vision for the country and accelerate the thinking and the military national strategy inspired by the ideologies of Simón Bolívar, Simon Rodriguez and Ezequiel Zamora. The university was formally launched by presidential orders on 3 September 2010, 200 years from the day of the founding of the Military Academy of Venezuela, one of the oldest military academies in Latin America, to help understand the issue of safety in a holistic manner and to respond in complex form, thru the complete integration of all 5 service academies of the National Armed Forces.

The VBMU promotes the integration and educational interaction of all five service branches. Also, the military civic integration also recognizes both dimensions as a condition sine qua non for the guarantee of the security of the Venezuelan State. This University System has the mission of educating integrally all its cadets, with ethical, moral, spiritual and socialist values, to prepare them for the duties of being an officer in the National Bolivarian Armed Forces' various service arms and the militia, through a process of humanistic, scientific, technical and sporting skills, to fulfill the tasks inherent to all 5 service branches in national defence and security as well as in contributing to national development. Headquartered in Fort Tiuna in Caracas with branches in Catia del Mar and Maracay (with a new branch now fully opened at Fort Guaicaipuro in Charallave, Miranda), Divisional General Alexis Jose Rodriguez Cabello serves as its president as of 2016.

The University System is composed of the following service academies and schools:

===== Service academies =====
- Military Academy of the Bolivarian Army, (Caracas, Capital District)
- Military Academy of the Bolivarian Navy, (Catia La Mar, Vargas State)
- Military Academy of the Bolivarian Aviation, (Maracay, Aragua State)
- Military Academy of the Bolivarian National Guard, (Caracas, Capital District)
- Bolivarian Military Technical Academy, (Maracay, Aragua State)
  - National Armed Forces College of Military Communications, Electronics and Information Technology (Academia Tecnica Militar de Comunicaciones, Electrónica y Informatica)
- Military Academy of Troop Officers Commander in Chief Hugo Rafael Chávez Frías, (Santa Teresa del Tuy, Charallave, Miranda State)
- Military Health Sciences College, (Caracas, Capital District)
- Military Medical Academy, (Caracas, Capital District)

===== Specialty schools =====
- Army Infantry School General-in-Chief Rafael Urdaneta
- Army Cavalry and Armor School Major General Juan Guillermo Iribarren
- Army Artillery School Colonel Diego Jalón
- Army Logistics School Brigadier General José Gabriel Pérez
- Army Military Engineering School Brigadier General Francisco Jacot
- Naval Tactical Studies School
- Air Power College
- Internal Security Studies School
- Armed Forces School of Intelligence Brigadier General Daniel Florence O'Leary
- National Armed Forces College of Military Communications, Electronics and Information Technology (Instituto Universitario Militar de Comunicaciones, Electrónica y Informatica de la Fuerza Armada Nacional, IUMCOELIFA)
- Languages College of the National Armed Forces Generalissimo Francisco de Miranda
  - Army Languages School
  - Navy Languages School
  - Air Force Languages School
  - National Guard School of Languages

===== Post-graduate colleges =====
- National Defense Advanced Studies Institute Grand Marshal of Ayacucho Anthonio Jose de Sucre (Instituto de Altos Estudios de la Defensa Nacional, IAEDEN)
- National Armed Forces War College Liberator Simón Bolívar

==== National Experimental University of the Armed Forces ====
The National Experimental University of the Armed Forces (Spanish: Universidad Nacional Experimental Politécnica de la Fuerza Armada Bolivariana, UNEFA) is a Venezuelan public university associated with the Venezuelan armed forces. Founded in 1974 as the National Armed Forces Higher Polytechnical Institution (Instituto Universitario Politécnico de las Fuerzas Armadas Nacionales), it was renamed by the Venezuelan president Hugo Chávez in 1999 to its current name. Its mission is the training of civilian personnel in the NAF and all military personnel, plus civilians in educational skills, and it also offers doctoral programs and post-graduate studies.

Its president, as of 2015, is Vice Admiral Elisa Amelia Di Tizio, Deputy Minister of Education for National Defense.

=== Women in the Armed Forces ===
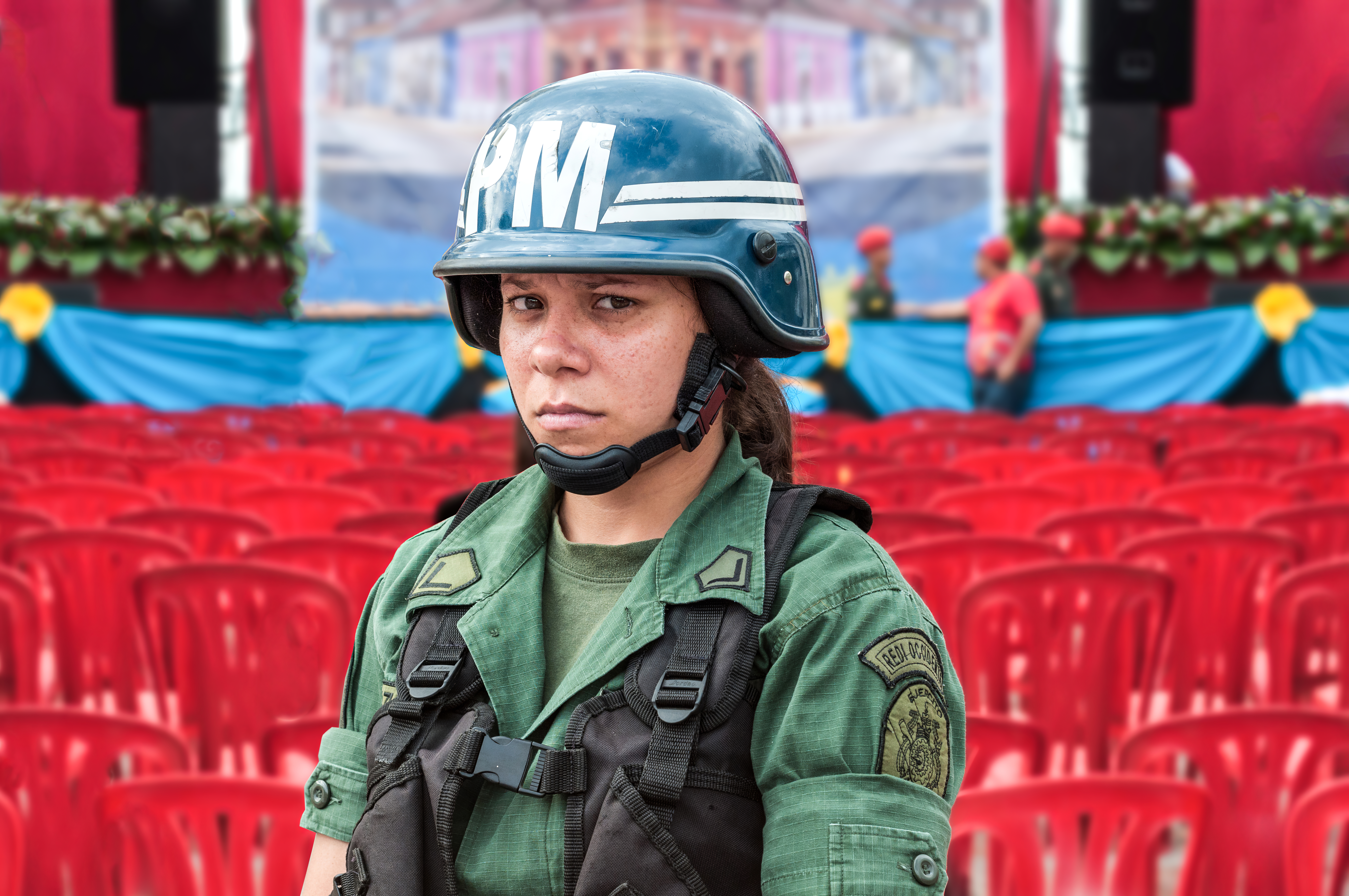
Woman of Bolivarian Armed Forces in a presidential meeting

Currently, the four components that make up the NBAF (the Army, Navy, Air Force and the National Guard, plus the National Militia and the Presidential Honor Guard Brigade as well) have women who choose a military career for their professional development part of their ranks as either enlisted personnel, non-commissioned officers and officers. Within these service branches, the Venezuelan military woman has achieved important positions.

Boys and girls also join together as students of the various educational institutions jointly operated by the service branches of the National Armed Forces through their foundations and the Ministry of Education from pre-school to the secondary level.

Historical dates of the achievements of the Venezuelan women in the National Bolivarian Armed Forces:

- July 1977: first contingent of women to enter a school of training of officers of the armed forces of Venezuela, specifically to the aviation school in Maracay.
- June 2007: first woman pilot certified to fly the Mi-26 helicopter, the world's biggest helicopter.
- 4 July 2007: first woman promoted to the rank of Rear Admiral.
- 28 December 2008: A woman Brigadier General founded the Military Technical School of the NBAF (today the Military Technical Academy and formerly the Armed Forces Basic School) as Directress, the first-ever woman to hold the director post in a Venezuelan service academy.
- 5 July 2010: the Venezuelan Government conferred Manuela Sáenz (also called the "Libertadora del Libertador"), the grade of brigadier general of the Bolivarian army of Venezuela posthumously, as the "posthumous recognition of the virtues of heroine of American independence" due to her outstanding contributions in the Spanish American wars of independence.
- 27 November 2009: first female pilot of fighter aircraft.
- 23 January 2012: first woman to complete a flight on a Venezuelan Air Force Super King Air B200
- 3 July 2012: first woman promoted to Admiral
- 28 May 2013: The Venezuelan National Guard's Air Command welcomed its first female pilot in history.

During the National Independence Day Armed Forces Promotions ceremony at the Fort Montana Barracks in Caracas on 5 July 2013, also marking 4 months after the sudden death of Hugo Chávez, President of Venezuela Nicolás Maduro announcement that Admiral Carmen Teresa Meléndez Rivas, the first-ever Venezuelan female admiral in history and by then the current Presidential Secretary, would be appointed as the first-ever female Minister of Defense in the nation's history as well as in its military history. She was later promoted as the very first female 4-sun flag officer of the Venezuelan Navy and of the National Armed Forces as a whole before officially taking over her ministerial duties.

== Ranks, uniforms and insignia ==
=== Military ranks ===
The most important reform in more than a century was in 2008, with the enactment of the reform of the Organic Law of the National Armed Forces, which established, among many innovations, the transformation of the non-commissioned officer level "technical officer" to commissioned officer status. As part of the same reform, the rank of Major General, intermediate rank that comes after Divisional General and before the rank of General in Chief, was officially created. In the case of the Navy, the rank of Admiral in Chief, created also by the same reforms, is now equivalent to General in Chief. Thus the officer rank system used today is more compatible to those used by most armed forces.

Since 2011, the officer corps has been divided into Commissioned Candidate, Regular Commissioned, Troop and Command Corps officers. The latter three, alongside the Technical Officers Corps, form the regular officer corps. Commissioned Candidates are civilian commissioned officers.

Article 62 of the Organic Law of the National Bolivarian Armed Forces has the full order of ranks of military officers, and their equivalents in the Navy, while Article 63 of the Organic Law lists the full order of ranks for non-commissioned service personnel and Article 69 of the said law provides the military hierarchy of the enlisted personnel and ratings of the National Armed Forces.

In 2014, amendments made to the Organic Law of the National Bolivarian Armed Forces give the following as the highest rank for the following officer corps:

- Major General/Vice Admiral – Technical Officers Corps
- Brigadier General/Rear Admiral – Troop Officers Corps
- Brigadier General/Rear Admiral – Commissioned Candidate Officers Corps

==== Three-sun ranking ====
Venezuelan three suns

The rank of Lieutenant General (Mayor General in Spanish), a rank immediately below the General and above Major General, was established in 2007 in the aftermath of the Armed Forces Organic Law amendments and in the Navy, Squadron Vice Admiral (three-suns) and Admiral (four-suns) are the equivalents today.

These officers are assigned mostly to the leadership of military regions (REDI), Commanders General of the service branches, the Inspector General, deputy ministers in the Ministry of Defense, and temporarily as Chief of the NBAF-OSC, if the Minister of Defence is an official asset, with the officeholder having the rank of General in Chief or Admiral in Chief. Before 2007, the 3 sun rank belonged to Generals in Chief and Admirals, and is equivalent to the rank of lieutenant general or vice admiral in most countries.

One must not confuse this rank with the General staff rank of Major General used in most of the armed forces of the world, which is equivalent to the second rank of general officers in most armies and several air forces.

==== Four-sun ranking ====
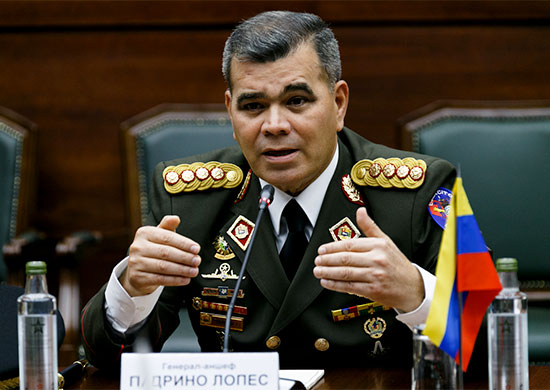
General-in-chief Vladimir Padrino López in his uniform with visible insignia

Since the age of the independence war in Venezuela, the most senior officer is designated as general-in-chief (general en jefe). From its creation, the rank was represented by three mythical suns (equivalent to three-star rank), but with the creation in 2008 of the rank of Lieutenant General, four mythical suns (equivalent to four-star rank) are used. If used in the Navy, it is called as admiral (almirante en jefe) since 2008 (formerly the 3 sun rank was of an Admiral), uses the same 4 suns in the shoulder board, and the sleeve insignia used mirrors that of a full Admiral in the Royal Navy.

==== Commander-in-Chief rank and insignia ====
The office of the Venezuelan military supreme commander in chief has always been held by the President of Venezuela as per constitutional requirements. However, with the new law sanctioned in 2008, the "Comandante en Jefe" rank is not only a function attributed to the executive branch but a full military rank given to the president upon taking office. Upon assumption he receives a saber, epaulette, shoulder knot, shoulder board and sleeve insignia and full military uniform to be used in military events while performing the duties as president. The shoulder insignia mirrors Cuban practice but is derived from the German-styled officer rank insignia.

=== Berets ===
Berets are worn by some units in the National Armed Forces, with distinctive colors for some units or functions. The beret colors are as follows:

Colour	Wearer
black	Venezuelan Army general issue berets.
black	Venezuelan Army Special Forces Battalions
black	Venezuelan Marine Corps (since 2009).
maroon	Venezuelan National Guard general issue berets.
forest green	Army jungle infantry troops.
forest green	Army mountain troops.
forest green	Army irregular/counter-irregular infantry (caribes).
red	Presidential Honor Guard Brigade (armed forces joint unit).
red	Armed Forces and Ministry of Defense General Headquarters Battalion (Minister Of Defence troops (Caracas Battalion), armed forces joint unit).
red	42nd Airborne Brigade (Army).
red	311th Infantry Battalion "Simon Bolivar" (Army). Wears the red beret as one of the first and oldest active infantry battalions of the Army to be raised in the modern era (raised 1942).
blue	Venezuelan Air Force Infantry Units (Infantería Aérea) and personnel of the Air Force Police (Policia Aerea).
dark blue	Army Headquarters Battalion (Lieutenant General Daniel Florence O´Leary Headquarters Battalion).

== Modernization program ==
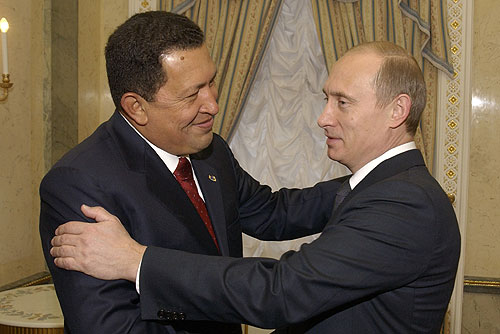
Hugo Chávez, and Vladimir Putin. Russia has been the main supplier of weapons to Venezuela.

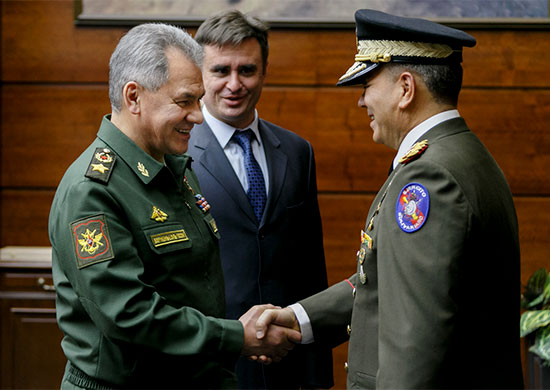
Sergey Shoigu and Vladimir Padrino López

The Venezuelan government has embarked on a massive military purchase programme. This has included negotiations for German submarines and transport aircraft, several agreements with Russia (outlined below), transport aircraft and naval vessels from Spain, radars from China, home-made and designed armored light vehicles and rocket launchers, studies for Russian main battle tanks and infantry fighting vehicles, amongst many others. Most if not all European military hardware have not been delivered to Venezuela due to the U.S. embargo.

=== Surveillance radars, AK-103s and helicopters: Mi-17, Mi-26 and Mi-35 ===
In 2005, Venezuela acquired 3 JYL-1 long range 3D surveillance radars from China at a cost of $150 million. The 3 JYL-1s, which are truck mounted, were all delivered by 2007.

In 2005, Venezuela bought 51 military helicopters from Russia. By 2008, all 51 had been delivered to the Venezuelan armed forces. The helicopters acquired were: 40 Mi-17, 3 Mi-26 and 8 Mi-35. In 2006, Venezuela purchased 100,000 Russian AK-103 assault rifles. All were delivered in 2006. Chávez also claimed to have acquired a license to manufacture Kalashnikovs in Venezuela,

=== Su-30s and missiles ===
In 2006, Venezuela purchased 24 Su-30MK jet fighters also from Russia, all delivered by 2008. In order to equip those fighters the country bought a large assortment of missiles, it is estimated that Venezuela acquired: 200 laser-guided bombs types KAB-500 and KAB-1500, 50 Kh-29 air-to-surface missiles, 50 Kh-31A1 anti-ship missiles, 50 Kh-59ME TV-guided cruise missiles, 100 Vympel R-27 medium-range air-to-air missiles and 150 Vympel R-73 short-range air-to-air missiles.

=== Night vision equipment, sniper rifles and submarines ===
In 2007, the Belarusian military optics industry agreed to supply the Venezuelan army with night vision devices, and install on, as Hugo Chávez described, "every single rifle in the Venezuelan army." The deal is valued at $3–$24 million. Later that year, Chávez announced plans to purchase of 5,000 Dragunov sniper rifles from the Russian Rosoboronexport, adding that Venezuela must ready itself for a "possible U.S. invasion." It is not clear whether that deal was completed. In all, from 2005 to 2007 Venezuela purchased more than $4.4 billion in weapons from Russia.

After signing an "initial contract", Venezuela was expected in June 2007 to finalize the acquisition of five diesel Project 636 Kilo class submarines, and at a later date finalize the acquisition of four diesel Project 677 Amur class submarines. In spite of the expectations, Chávez didn't sign the deal. Ten months later in April 2008, Venezuela decided to negotiate with Russia a loan of about $800 million for the acquisition of 4 diesel Project 636 Kilo class submarines.

During that time Venezuela was also considering the purchase of 12 Il-76 transport aircraft. The submarines plus the aircraft were going to cost a total of $1.5 billion. This acquisition deal wasn't completed either. The negotiations for the purchase of the submarines broke down and 6 submarines that were once planned for Venezuela are now being offered to Vietnam.

=== Russian loans and the Chinese K-8W light jet ===
In September 2008, Russia provided Venezuela with a $1 billion loan to buy Russian weapons. Venezuela has shown interest on the following weapons: TOR-M1 SAM systems, T-72 tanks, Su-35 jet fighters and Il-76 military cargo aircraft. Despite the interest and the Russian credit line, no deal has been finalized. In October 2008 Rosoboronexport informed that Venezuela was close to buying among other things a "large shipment of BMP-3" infantry fighting vehicles. The deal was not finalized.

Also in September Chávez confirmed that Venezuela purchased 24 K-8 Karakorum trainer jets from China. The deal, which is estimated to be worth between $72–$84 million, was the biggest Venezuelan arms deal of 2008.

On 21 July 2010, one K-8W crashed during a training flight. A statement by Venezuelan Air Force commander blamed engine failure. Both pilot and assistant ejected.

Venezuela acquired an undisclosed number of SA-24 Igla-S man-portable surface to air missiles. The SA-24 Igla-S is the most advanced version built in Russia. This acquisition was only confirmed after 50 SA-24 Igla-S were paraded by soldiers in Caracas in April 2009. In reaction to the acquisition the US State Department declared: "We are concerned about Venezuelan arms purchases that exceed its needs and are therefore potentially destabilizing."

In September 2009, Russia agreed to loan Venezuela over $2 billion to finance the purchase of weapons including tanks and advanced anti-aircraft missiles. It was stated that because of lower crude prices, the country needed to borrow the money for defence spending to avoid cuts in education and health. The deal includes orders for 92 T-72 tanks and the Buk-M2, S-125 Neva/Pechora missile system and S-300 air-defence systems and also the BM-30 Smerch rocket artillery system. President Hugo Chávez stated that "Venezuela has no plans to invade anybody, or to be aggressive towards anybody," and "with these rockets it's going to be very difficult for foreign planes to come and bomb us". Chávez repeated Venezuela's commitment to developing nuclear power for peaceful purposes with the help of Russia and reiterated his strong opposition to nuclear weapons.

=== Contract with China for modernization of the Venezuelan Marine Corps ===
Venezuelan President Hugo Chávez said in 2012 that his government will buy amphibious tanks from China for its military. Chávez isn't saying how many of the armored vehicles Venezuela intends to buy, but says the deal signed Tuesday calls for a Chinese company to begin delivering the tanks next year. He announced the deal in a speech to troops, saying the $500 million cost will be financed through loans that China has offered Venezuela in exchange for oil shipments.

The new armored equipment arrived in the country in 2014 and are now at the service of the Venezuelan Marine Corps.

China has also sent HQ 9 and HQ 16 air defense systems to Venezuela.

=== The Russian Federation gives new credit and interest in the Su-35 ===
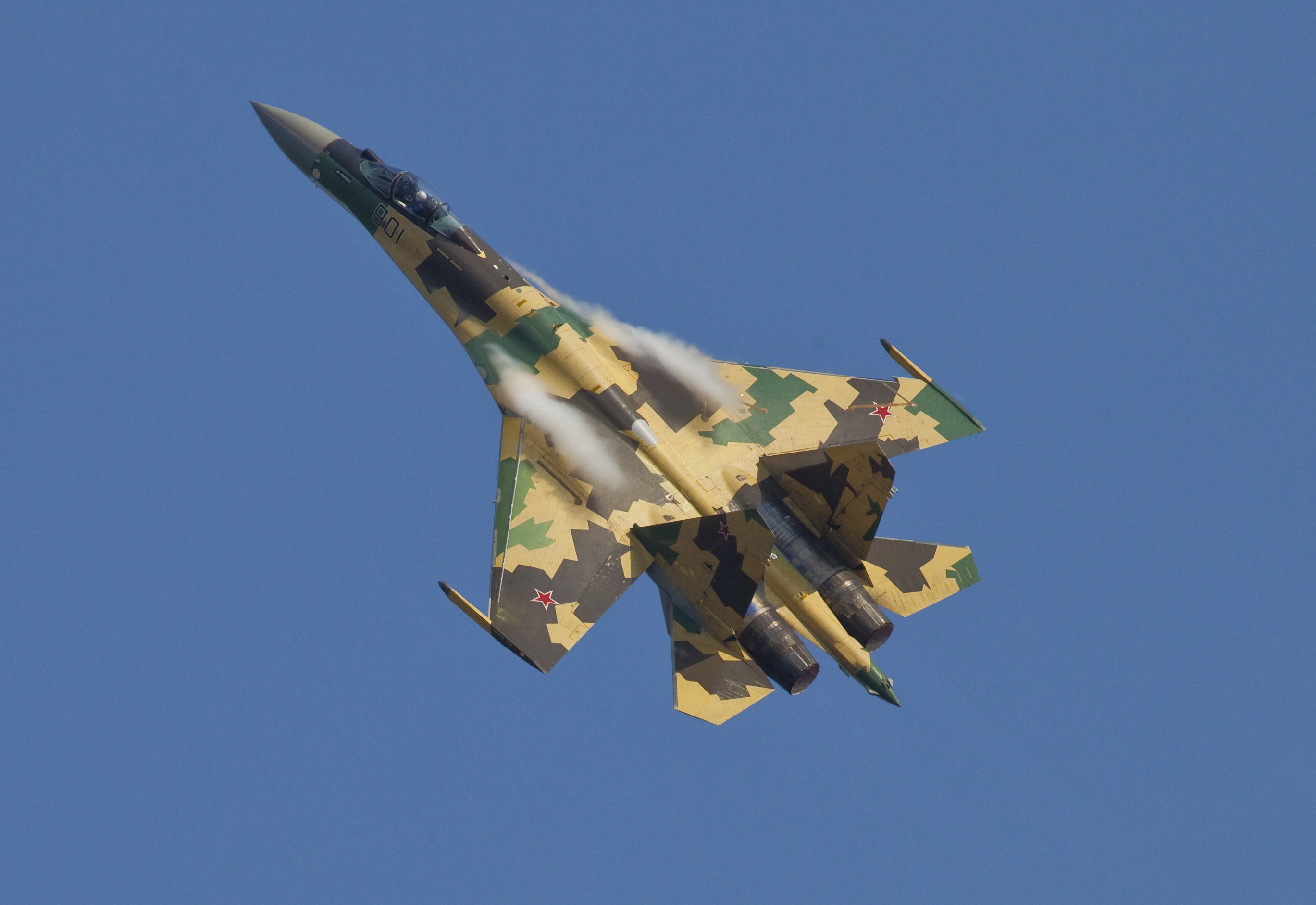
A Sukhoi Su-35

Venezuelan President Hugo Chávez said he was interested in buying Sukhoi Su-35 Flanker-E multirole fighter jets from Russia to enhance his country's defense capabilities. "I have already sent a statement to the government of Russia that we are ready to consider buying in the next few years Su-35 fighters to modernize and enhance our defense powers" Venezuela's national radio quoted Chávez as saying.

Russia and Venezuela have signed an agreement on a $4 billion loan for the oil-rich Latin American partner to buy Russian weaponry. "Two billion will be provided next year and another two billion in 2013," Venezuelan President Hugo Chávez said.

=== Controversy with the United States ===
These acquisitions and other projects were greeted with criticism from the United States, which opposed the government of President Hugo Chávez. In 2008, U.S. Admiral Jim Stavridis stated concern about Venezuela's high level of weapons in purchases a region that's not prone to going to war but has the capacity to solve peacefully its disputes. Venezuela was also accused of supplying small arms to neighboring Colombian guerrilla organizations including FARC, which was sympathetic to Chávez.

United States criticism is met with skepticism by Venezuelan authorities, who claim the weapons are needed to update the basic equipment in the armed forces. In some cases, Venezuelan armaments like the FN FAL have been in service more than 50 years. The government also claims that the U.S. has been the one to initiate arms races and de-stabilize countries by supplying subversive groups in Latin America throughout the past century, referring to the 1954 Guatemalan coup d'état and U.S. support for the anti-communist Contras during the Cold War. Venezuela however has publicly acknowledged its own role in the supplying of thousands of FN Fal rifles, heavy antitank weapons and air support to the Sandinista uprising in Nicaragua during 1978–1979.

In the 1990s Venezuela requested a batch of F-16C/Ds to update its F-16 fighter fleet, but the U.S. government blocked the request. In October 1997 the U.S. government approved the sale of the two crash replacement F-16s, but subsequently halted the sale. In 2005, a contract with Israel Aircraft Industries to upgrade Venezuela's F-16s was frozen following U.S. pressure. Chávez subsequently accused the U.S. of delaying the sale of spare parts to maintain Venezuela's F-16s. After remarks by Chávez that he would sell or lend the 'unused' F-16's to any country that wanted them, including Iran, the U.S. Government agreed to supply the spare parts; however, the shipment was detained at the Customs Office in Maiquetia International Airport due to security concerns.

=== U.S. military embargo ===
In May 2006, the United States announced an embargo of military material and equipment to Venezuela. No American-made weapons or technology can be sold to Venezuela by any country or company. This embargo has harmed several Venezuelan purchases, as not only are U.S. technology goods unavailable, but other nations friendly to the U.S. have been pressured to block sales of arms to Venezuela, as well. This is also considered one of the reasons Venezuela has turned to Russia and China for arms, in a move reminiscent of the Cold War.

In 2005, Venezuela signed agreements with Spain to procure 12 naval transport and reconnaissance aircraft and eight naval patrol vessels. The deal is worth $1.5-2 billion dollars to the Spanish defense industry, as well as an estimated 900 new jobs, but was cancelled due to the U.S. embargo. The cancellation does not affect the eight naval patrol vessels.

Below is a list of acquisitions frustrated directly or indirectly by the U.S. embargo:

- Aero L-159 Alca Jets from the Czech Republic: the Czech government forbade Aero Vodochody, the manufacturer, from creating a variant with French avionics and Ukrainian engines, specially requested by Venezuela.
- (Sweden) Saab, a Swedish arms company announced it would honor the U.S. embargo, and would not sell arms to Venezuela. Carl Gustav recoilless rifles, AT4 AT weapons, as well as RBS-70 AA systems are in service in the Venezuelan military.
- (Spain) Spanish company EADS CASA halted the sale of several transport planes that contained extensive U.S. technology.
- Brazil was forced to cancel the sale of Embraer Super Tucano airplanes to the Venezuelan Air Force due to its use of Pratt & Whitney engines. Embraer was also forced to cancel the sale of AEW&C equipped planes.
- France decided to block the sale of Scorpène-class submarines to Venezuela.
- (Russia) Russian companies Rosoboronexport and Sukhoi have been sanctioned by the U.S. government for procuring arms for Venezuela.

The Russian Federation has continued sending arms to Venezuela despite the US embargo. Russia has agreed to sell more than $4 billion (£2 billion) worth of armaments to Venezuela since 2005 and disclosed that Mr Chávez wanted new antiaircraft systems and more fighter jets.

President Hugo Chávez acknowledged that the joint production of cars between his country and Iran had been affected by the United States embargo on the Islamic country.

The Spanish Minister of Defense, Pedro Morenes, has defended the sale of military equipment to Venezuela, and reported that a delegation from the public company Navantia has traveled to the capital of the country, Caracas, to try to sell new products to the Chávez government. Morenes has made these statements during a speech at the plenary session of the Congress to reply to an interpellation by the spokesman for Izquierda Unida, Jose Luis Centella, on the Ministry of defence plans for the coming years and the Spanish missions abroad.

== Role of the military in Venezuelan politics ==
From 1810 up to the 1819 Angostura Congress that created Gran Colombia, and into the era of national independence since 1831, the National Armed Forces helped shaped the political, economical, social and national affairs of Venezuela, with so many military led-governments that led the nation until the late 1950s (with a brief break in the 1940s), several of them under strong military dictators. After Marcos Perez Jimenez left in 1958, the military role in government affairs ended with the framing of the 1961 Constitution and the replacement by civilian leaders of the military anti-Jimenez government that took power after the 1958 coup.

The years that followed saw 2 coup attempts by military personnel with the help of groups disillusioned by government policies in the 1960s, and military repressions of student and civil rallies and actions from the late 60s onward, all these happening while fighting rebel groups present in the national territory and on the Venezuelan-Colombian border region. All these led up to the events of the 1989 Caracazo, in which National Guardsmen crushed anti-government actions and riots in the capital area with great severity, causing the deaths of hundreds, which in turn resulted in the coup attempts of 1992 and 1993.

By the time Hugo Chávez assumed the presidency in 1999, retired armed forces personnel who served with him were appointed to several cabinet posts and were given seats in the National Assembly. Chávez only allowed retired military personnel to run for elective posts at all levels as well as to serve in appointive government positions except for the Ministries of Defense and the Interior, per tradition led by active generals of the armed forces (the latter since the early 21st century).

Article 64 of the Constitution of the Bolivarian Republic of Venezuela guarantees the right to vote in elections to all service personnel of the armed forces without any limitation whatsoever. This right was not guaranteed in earlier versions of the Venezuelan constitution.

=== Venezuelan military coup d'états ===
The NAF were involved in many coup d'états in national history:

- 1908 Venezuelan coup d'état
- 1945 Venezuelan coup d'état
- 1948 Venezuelan coup d'état
- 1958 Venezuelan coup d'état
- February 1992 Venezuelan coup d'état attempt (Army's movement)
- November 1992 Venezuelan coup d'état attempt (Air Force's movement)
- April 2002 Venezuelan coup d'état attempt

== Role in Venezuelan society ==
=== Humanitarian relief ===
The tragedy of Vargas in December 1999, brought with it several lessons, that the Government knew how to assimilate, one of them was the quick action of the FANB to assist populations in danger, and the reconstruction of devastated areas. Since then, Venezuela through the FANB, participated in numerous actions of humanitarian assistance, in several countries of the world.

- Humanitarian International Brigade "Simón Bolívar"

It is a unit created in order to attend immediately to populations affected by natural calamities, both nationally and internationally. Ecuador, Cuba, among others.

- Battalion 51 "Dra. Migledys Campos Goatache"

It is a unit of civilian and military doctors who assists medical in remote areas of national and international geography.

== Military industry ==
Venezuela currently shows an industrial development in the defence sector, that sector still far from compared to countries such as Brazil AND Argentina, if it has meant a noticeable advance respect to the last decade of the 20th-century Venezuelan. In the opinion of Francisco Arias Cardenas (ex – presidential candidate; former member of parliament; and current candidate for the governorship of Zulia State, by the ruling party PSUV): "in the 13 years of management of the current Government there has been an armed forces industry of its own, having the autonomy that lacked in the Fourth Republic, when transnational corporations controlled the military sector of the country. This advance of the Venezuelan military industry gives us a range of greater encouragement, that is what we need, and the possibility of applying our inventiveness to the development of technologies that give us genuine autonomy to defend our territory."

It was planned that Venezuela would manufacture all-terrain vehicles, trucks, ammunition, rifles, unmanned aircraft, grenades, assembled ships of small and medium-sized ports among other products, produced by state corporations, however, most of these are unable to operate due to lack of personnel, resources, and even in some cases lack of support from the government, these corporations are:

=== IBIDIFANB ===
IBIDIFANB (Instituto Bolivariano de Investigación, Desarrollo e Innovación de la Fuerza Armada Nacional Bolivariana), shall develop all projects that have much impact in what is maintain operational sizing in the FANB, maintain equipment and also has the possibility of supporting the national development with the generation of some research projects, some technological lines can do good for the people of Venezuela

=== CAVIM ===
CAVIM (C.A. Venezolana de Industrias Militares, Venezuelan Military Industries Company Ltd.) is the national corporation owned by the Ministry of Defense charged with developing a national military industry by producing weapons, ammunition, uniforms and other products to be utilized by the service personnel of the National Armed Forces. It has currently demonstrated capabilities in the development and production of rifles, grenades, shotguns, unmanned aircraft, explosives for industrial use, ammunition, bulletproof vests, kevlar helmets, among other products, weapons, logistics and various utensils for use by the NAF.

In January 2011, an explosion of unidentified causes and the subsequent fire scorched five CAVIM arms and ammunition depots in the state of Aragua, leading to one official fatality and nearly 10,000 people being evacuated. In February 2013, the United States Government sanctioned Venezuela's Military Industries Company (CAVIM), as well as other 12 foreign companies, including four Chinese firms, for the sale of arms and military technology to Iran, North Korea or Syria.

=== DIANCA ===
DIANCA (Diques y Astilleros Nacionales C.A.), is the state shipyard of the Bolivarian Republic of Venezuela. It was created in 1905 in the city of Puerto Cabello, Carabobo state.

=== UCOCAR ===
UCOCAR (Unidad Naval Coordinadora de los Servicios de Carenado de la Armada) is responsible for the repair, maintenance and construction of ships, equipment, systems, helmet and structures up to 1,000 tonnes, in support of the armed forces, public firms and private sector entities. Several boats have been designed, and the company has an agreement with the Dutch shipyard firm Damen, to assemble some ships to be used by the Venezuelan Navy. This firm also produces the Guardian G-25 riverine craft boats being used by both the Navy and the National Guard.

=== CIDAE ===
CIDAE (Centro de Investigación y Desarrollo Aeronáutico) is a scientific center making helmets for pilots. There have been upgrades of radar, and is involved with CAVIM, in the development of unmanned aircraft among other developments. Also this research center this trying time of short-range, solid fuel rockets. Likewise, the CIDAE has designed and built a Flight Simulator for the T-27 Tucano aircraft, as well as a simulator of flight to aircraft Cessna 208 Caravan, shooting simulators, and the recovery of the test benches of PT6 engines, with 80% of Venezuelan technology, not only in the design but in the software installation and the use of materials. CIDAE participa en el proyecto del satélite Simón Bolívar con China.

=== CENARECA ===
CENARECA (Centro Nacional de Repotenciación C.A.) is the manufacturer of the vehicle family all-terrain and high mobility (HMMWV) Tiuna, manufactured in serious to the Venezuelan armed forces, and donated in small quantities to Governments of the ALBA as Ecuador, Nicaragua and Bolivia.

=== MAZVEN ===
MAZVEN C.A. makes heavy trucks, under a joint venture with the Belarusian company MAZ. It manufactures five models of trucks including trucks for military use.

=== G&F Tecnología ===
G&F Tecnología is a Venezuelan company that develops an endogenous model of architecture technology oriented solutions derived from the design, development, implementation and operation of projects of telecommunications, information, aeronautics and electronics with increasing added value of applied knowledge. Specifically is a company manufacturer of unmanned aircraft, as well as communication equipment, and other electronic product.

== Military corporations of the Ministry of Defense ==
In addition, the Ministry of Defense operates the following nationally owned corporations aside from CAVIM:

- Armed Forces Communications Enterprises (EMCOFANB)
  - including National Boliviarian Armed Forces Television (TVFANB), Tiuna FM, 4 February Audiovisual Brigade and the NBAF newspaper, The Patriot (El Patriota)
- National Armed Forces Agricultural Products Corporation (AGROFANB)
- Military Transport Company Ltd. (EMILTRA)
- Armed Forces Bank (BANFANB)
- Military Mining, Gas and Petroleum Company (CAMIMPEG)
- Safe Horizons Insurance (Seguros Horizonte, S.A.)

== See also ==
- Group of Belarusian military specialists in Venezuela
