= Bolivarian Military University of Venezuela =

Venezuelan public military university

- Universidad Militar Bolivariana de Venezuela
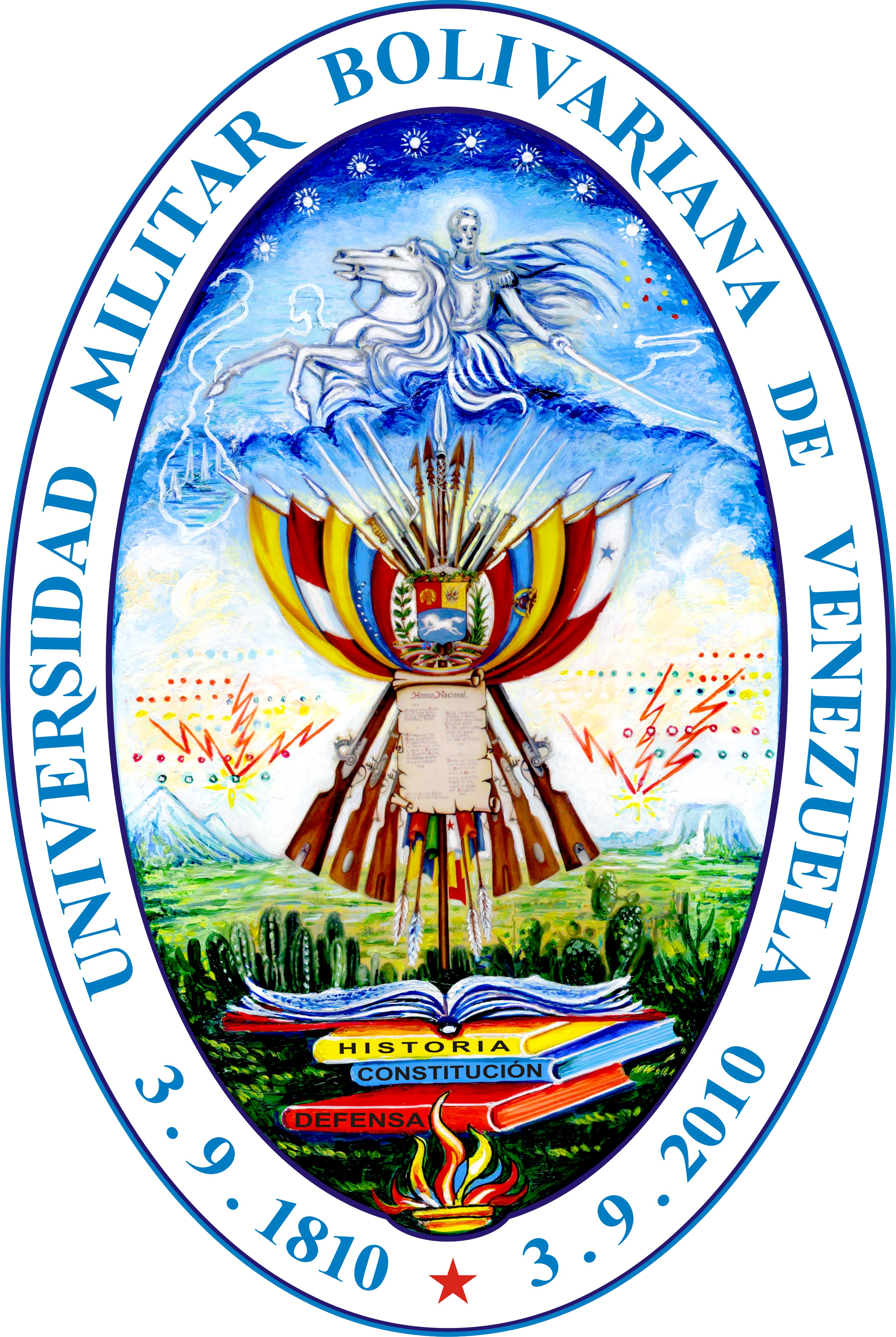
- Former name: Academia Militar de Venezuela
- Motto: Forjadora de Generaciones Vencedoras
- Motto in English: Forge of the Victorious Generations
- Type: Military
- Established: 3 September 2010
- Affiliations: National Bolivarian Armed Forces of Venezuela
- Rector: LTGEN Felix Ramón Osorio Guzmán
- Dean: MGEN Andrés Yalastasi Yépez
- Location: Caracas, Venezuelan Capital District, Venezuela
- Campus: Fort Tiuna, Caracas (Army, National Guard and Medical Academy) La Guaira (Navy) Maracay (Air Force and MTA)
- Colours: Blue and white
- Website: www.umbv.edu.ve

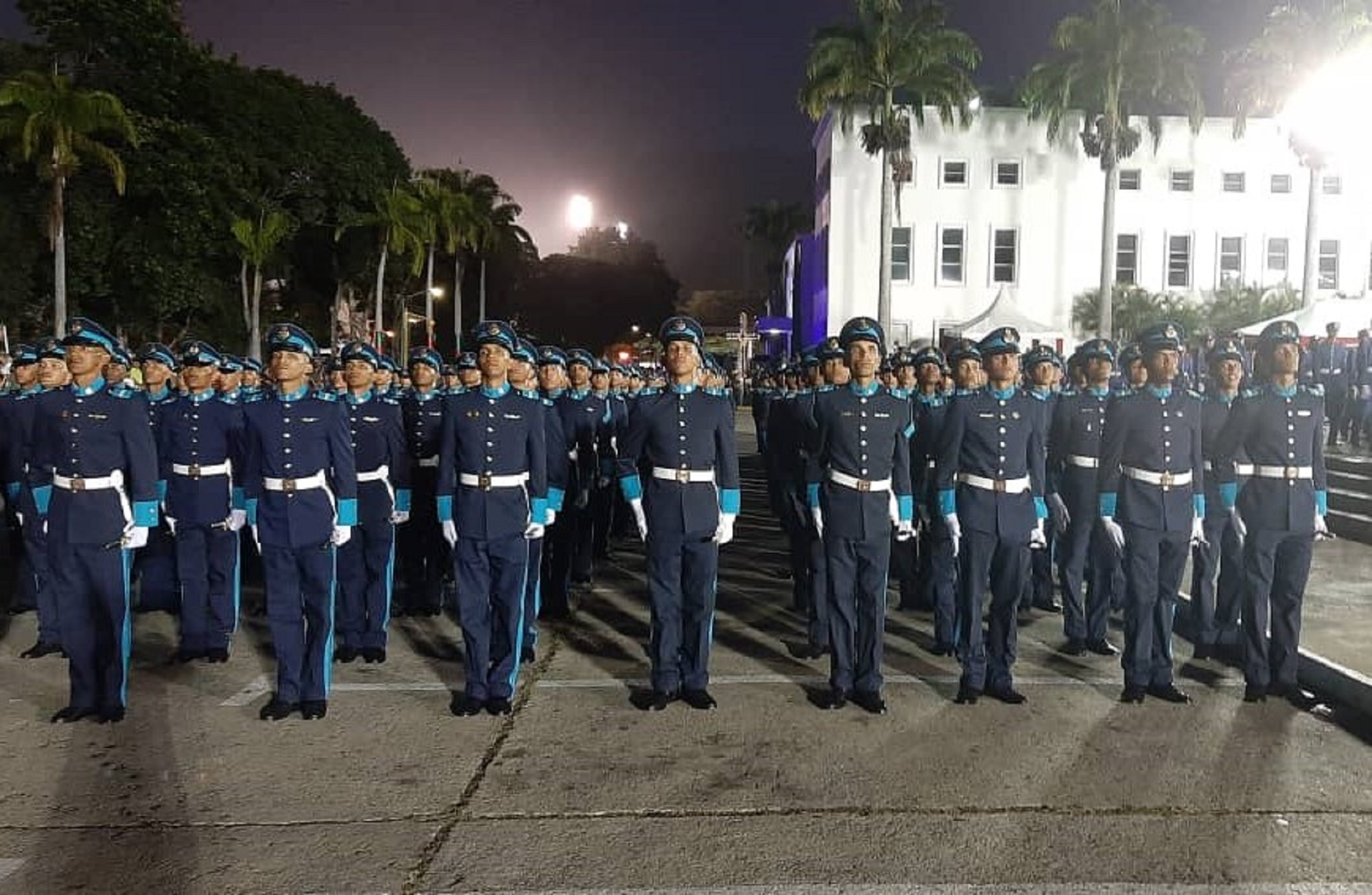
Cadets of Military Academy of Troop Officers Commander in Chief Hugo Rafael Chávez Frías

The Bolivarian Military University of Venezuela (Spanish: Universidad Militar Bolivariana de Venezuela) is a military university in Caracas, Venezuela, which operates under the Ministry of Defense. It was founded by Decree of the president Hugo Chávez. It is located in Caracas, Venezuela and it provides a four-year program of training for officer cadets.

== Organization ==
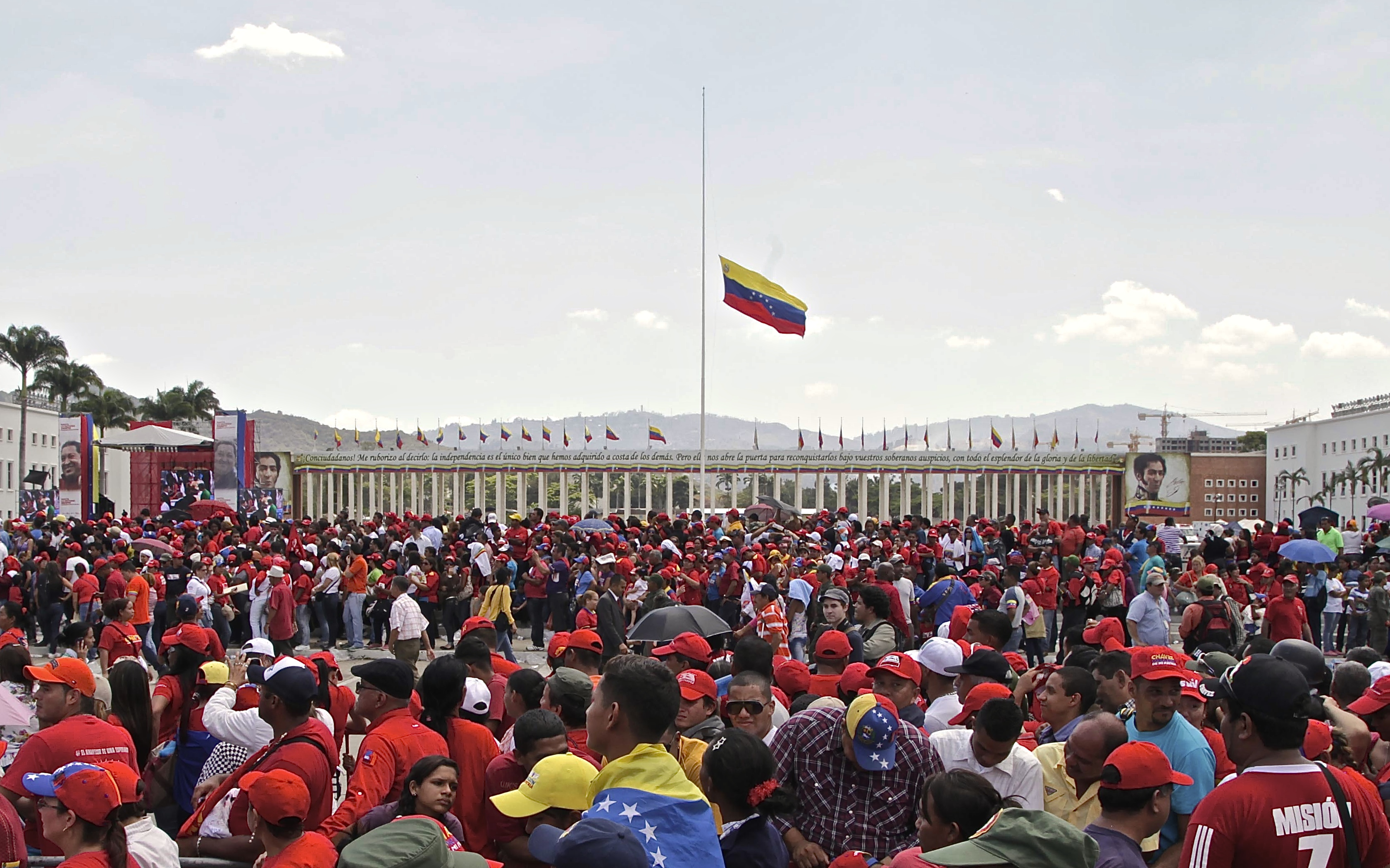
Supporters of Hugo Chávez at his funeral at the grounds of the Bolivarian Military University of Venezuela.

The UMBV is a system of Military academies, which offers studies in the different components that make up the armed forces of Venezuela. It is similar to several military academies in the world. It is a system of 5 military schools united in one single unit, also integrated by other schools and institutes recently opened.

The university system is composed of the following academies:

Military Academies

- Military Academy of the Bolivarian Army, Caracas
- Military Academy of the Bolivarian Navy, Catia la Mar
- Military Academy of the Bolivarian Aviation, Maracay
- Military Academy of the Bolivarian National Guard, Caracas
- Bolivarian Military Technical Academy, Maracay
  - National Armed Forces College of Military Communications, Electronics and Information Technology (Academia Tecnica Militar de Comunicaciones, Electrónica y Informatica)
- Military Academy of Troop Officers Commander in Chief Hugo Rafael Chávez Frías, Santa Teresa del Tuy
- Military Health Sciences College, Caracas
- Military Medical Academy, Caracas

The following are also part of the academy system as affiliates:

Tactical, Technical and Logistical Studies

- Army Infantry School General-in-Chief Rafael Urdaneta
- Army Cavalry and Armor School Major General Juan Guillermo Iribarren
- Army Artillery School Colonel Diego Jalón
- Army Logistics School Brigadier General José Gabriel Pérez
- Army Military Engineering School Brigadier General Francisco Jacot
- Naval Tactical Studies School
- Air Power College
- Internal Security Studies School
- Armed Forces School of Intelligence Brigadier General Daniel Florence O'Leary
- Languages College of the National Armed Forces Generalissimo Francisco de Miranda
  - Army Languages School
  - Navy Languages School
  - Air Force Languages School
  - National Guard School of Languages

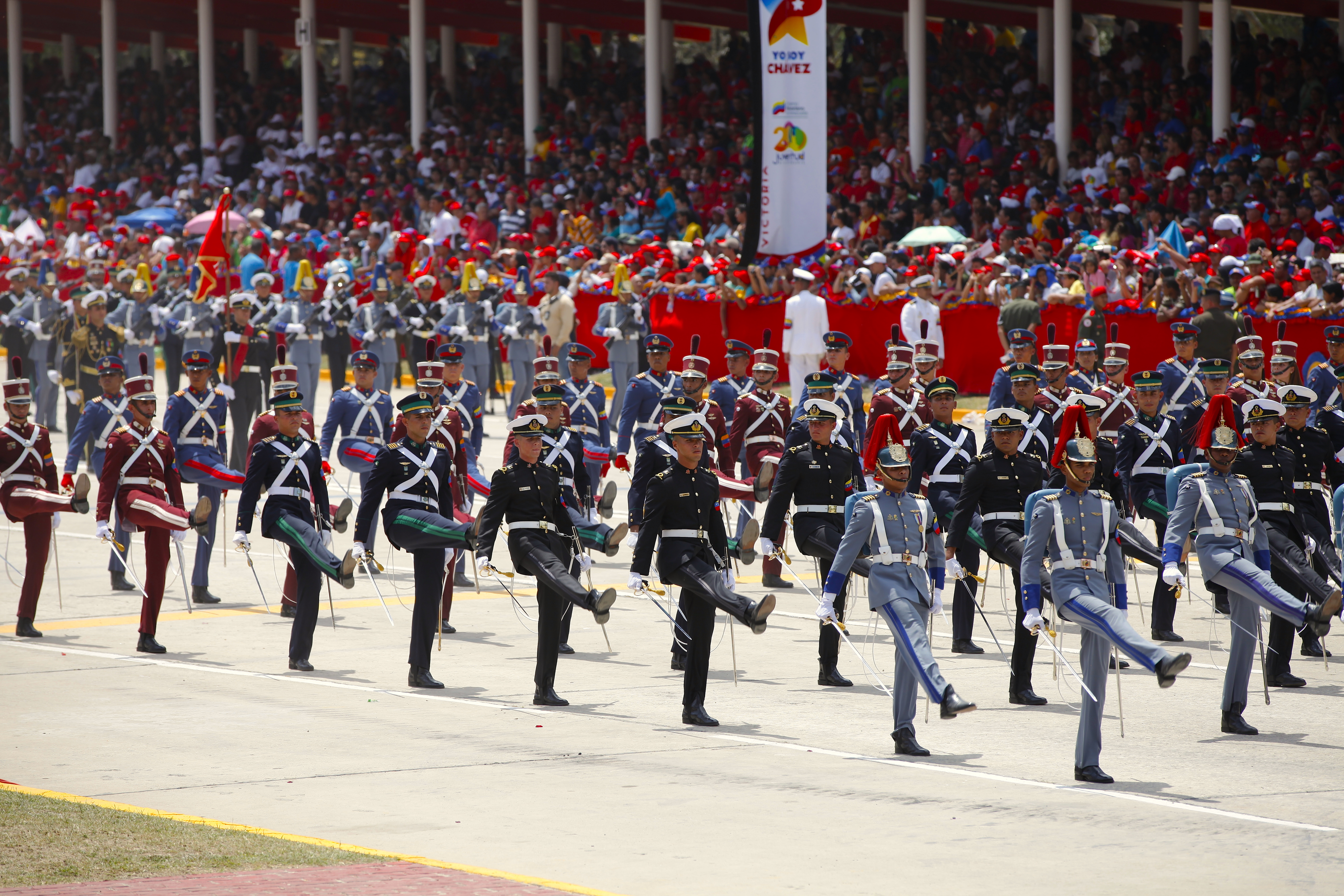
Cadets of the Bolivarian Military University perform a slow march during a military parade

Strategic Studies

- National Defense Advanced Studies Institute Grand Marshal of Ayacucho Anthonio Jose de Sucre (Instituto de Altos Estudios de la Defensa Nacional, IAEDEN)
- National Armed Forces War College Liberator Simón Bolívar
- Health Sciences Postgraduate School

Personnel Training Institutions
The following institutions are also affiliated to the BMUV system:

- Army NCO School Major General Jose Feliz Ribas
- Navy Seamen's Training School
- Air Force NCO School
- National Guard Formation Schools
- National Militia NCO School

Research and Development

- National Center for Military Scientific Development
- Army Research and Development Center

== See also ==
- Military of Venezuela
