= Military Academy of the Bolivarian Navy =

- Academia Militar de la Armada Bolivariana
- Logo of the AMEB.
- Motto: "Dios y Patria"
- Motto in English: "God and Fatherland"
- Type: Military
- Established: 1811
- Parent institution: Bolivarian Military University of Venezuela
- Affiliations: Armed Forces of Venezuela
- Superintendent: RDLM Jesús Landa Borges
- Commandant of Cadets: CPT Ramon Garcia Zambrano
- Location: Las Zorra, Catia La Mar, Vargas, Venezuela
- Colors: White and Light blue
- Website: www.umbv.edu.ve/amarb

The Military Academy of the Bolivarian Navy (in Spanish Academia Militar de la Armada Bolivariana), is an academy to train future officers of the Bolivarian Navy of Venezuela. Established in 1811, it is Venezuela's and America's oldest existing naval academy. At the end of training, the successful naval cadet graduates as an Officer of the Navy, and is commissioned to the military rank of Lieutenant Junior Grade.

== Mission-vision statement ==
The mission of the Military Academy of the Bolivarian Navy is:

To train naval cadets through a comprehensive process, with solid leadership principles, ethics, morals, sense of responsibility and relevance, optimal mental and physical conditions, educating in naval scenarios through the geo-strategic domain of computer systems and high technology, allowing to obtain a professional profile upon his or her graduation to serve as an Officer of the Navy of the Bolivarian Republic of Venezuela, including in the National Fleet and the Marine Corps.

It is envisioned thereforce as a center of naval officer training with higher moral and ethnical values, with a process of quality and excellence that is flexible enough to adapt and adjust to the advances of the naval sector, projecting itself as the best naval academy in all of Latin America.
