= Bolivarian Military Technical Academy =

Venezuelan military academy attached to the UMBV

- Academia Técnica Militar Bolivariana
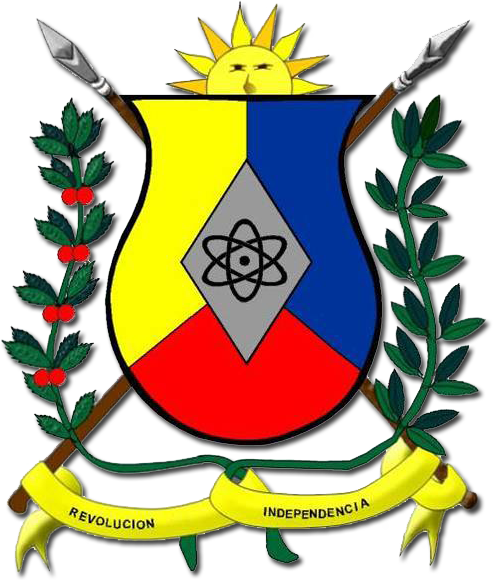
- Former names: Armed Forces Basic School (1991-2008); Technical Officers' School (2007-2010)
- Motto: Home of the Technical Officer Corps
- Type: Military
- Established: 2010 (current form)
- Parent institution: Armed Forces of Venezuela
- Academic affiliations: Bolivarian Military University of Venezuela
- Superintendent: BGEN Omar Enrique Pérez la Rosa
- Location: Maracay, Venezuela
- Colors: Navy blue and red
- Website: www.umbv.edu.ve/atmb/

The Bolivarian Military Technical Academy COL Juan Vicente Bolívar y Ponte (in Spanish Academia Técnica Militar Bolivariana), is an academy to train officers of technical and administrative services in the National Bolivarian Armed Forces of Venezuela.

Formerly the Armed Forces Basic School, it was given its current charter and was renamed to its present name in 2010, with its main campus in Maracay with branches in Caracas, Michelena and Caita La Mar.

== Brief history ==
In 1991, the Federal Government established the Armed Forces Basic School (Escuela Basica de la FF. AA. Nacionales, ESCUBAFAN, later on ESCUBAFANB) which served as a college-preparatory school preparing male and female graduates of high schools, public, private and military, for studies in the military academies after 2 years of education.

As part of the modernization and expansion of the armed forces to meet the challenges of the 21st century, then president Hugo Chávez transformed the Basic School to become the Technical Officers' Military Institute (Instituto de Formación de Oficiales Técnicos de la Fuerza Armada Nacional Bolivariana), with a four-year course for officers of the technical and administrative services of the National Armed Forces, in accordance with amendments to the Armed Forces Law made on 31 July 2008. This new institution merged the Basic School with the warrant officer schools which had then been closed as part of the transformation of the warrant officer corps to become the then brand new technical officer corps of the NBAF.

On 10 March 2009, the academy was granted a new charter, renamed as the Technical Officer's School (Escuela de Formación de Oficiales Técnicos, EFOTEC). Its current name and charter was given in 2010 when the Military University was founded.

Each of the schools under the BMTA system have long and distinguished histories of their own.

== Organization of the BMTA system ==
In 2019–2020, the BMTA was reorganized into four service-specialty and two occupational specialty schools:

- Army Technical Academy, Air Force Technical Academy, Armed Forces Communications and Electronics College, Health Sciences Academy and HQ Military Technical Academy - Maracay
- Naval Technical Academy - Caita La Mar
- National Guard Technical Academy - Michelena
- Health Sciences Academy - Caracas

== Curriculum ==
The BMTA is a medium-sized, highly residential baccalaureate college, with a full-time, four-year undergraduate program (five years for medical officers, 3 years for civilians in the communications courses) that emphasizes instruction in the arts, sciences, and professions with no graduate program.

As all its military cadets are commissioned as second lieutenants and ensigns in the technical services upon graduation, military and leadership education is nested with academic instruction in the following specialties and subjects:

- Navigation
- Hydrology
- Geography
- Industrial production and manufacture
- Military security and sciences
- Air power
- Logistics
- Information technology and electronics
- Finance
- Transport
- Health and Medicine
- Engineering
- Electrical engineering
- Environmental studies

All the military officer cadets of the academy, aside from their officer's commission, receive a Bachelor of Science degree upon graduation regardless of their major. The academy is accredited as a public education institution by the Ministry of Higher Education.

The civilian students in the communications course receive an associate degree in Electronics and Communications after three years' study.

== Controversies ==
=== Javier Toro Blanco Case ===
On July 11, 2023, an event shook the facilities of the Army Technical Military School in Maracay, Aragua state. Cadet Javier Toro Blanco, 17 years old and in his second year at the academy, was fatally wounded in the abdomen with a dagger. Toro Blanco was the son of Inspector Francisco Toro, an active officer in the Aragua state police. The official report issued by the Integral Defense Operational Zone number 44 in Aragua, under the direction of G/D Edward Stevens Betancourt Gudiño, states that the cadet suffered an abdominal wound and was immediately transported to the Cnel. Elbano Paredes Vivas Military Hospital in Maracay. After undergoing an exploratory laparotomy, doctors found injuries to the infrarenal aorta, the abdominal aorta, and a right renal injury. Despite medical efforts, Toro Blanco died from grade IV hypovolemic shock at approximately 9:30 p.m. on the same day. The alleged aggressor, identified as Johan Alberto Torrealba Seco, 19, and also a cadet at the institution, is said to have wounded Toro Blanco with a dagger during an argument in the academy's dormitory. After the incident, members of the National Armed Force, assigned to the Army Technical Military Academy, reported the incident to both higher authorities and the deceased's family. The General Directorate of Military Counterintelligence (Dgcim) and the Scientific, Penal and Criminal Investigation Corps (Cicpc) were involved in the investigation of the event. Inquiries to determine the exact circumstances of the murder within a military institution are under the responsibility of Military Prosecutor 13. Cadet Torrealba Seco has been arrested, although his place of detention has not been disclosed. Local press reports indicate that Javier Toro Blanco came from sector 13 de Junio in Santa Rita in the Francisco Linares Alcántara municipality and was the older brother in a two-child family.

=== Sexual Abuse Incident at the Bolivarian Technical Military Academy ===
On October 28, 2022, an incident that took place at the Bolivarian Technical Military Academy in 2021 came to light. The Public Ministry sentenced a captain and a first lieutenant of the Bolivarian National Armed Force (FANB) to 23 years in prison for the sexual abuse of a 17-year-old female student, by two superior officers. Captain Cristóbal Rafael Orozco and First Lieutenant Edicvani José Díaz Lozano, both 32, were found guilty of abusing the young woman who was studying Mechanical Engineering at the Bolivarian Technical Military Academy. The incident occurred on March 23, 2021. The student was on her way to a friend's room when she was intercepted by Captain Cristóbal Rafael Orozco at 7 a.m. While on her way to her friend's dormitory, the officer forcibly took her to his room, where he proceeded to undress and threaten her with obscene words. Shortly thereafter, First Lieutenant Edicvani José Díaz Lozano also participated in the abuse. Following these events, the young woman, affected by health problems related to the attack, was transferred to the academy's infirmary, where, regrettably, the two officers abused her again. The young woman's family filed a formal complaint, leading to an investigation coordinated by the Public Ministry. As a result, both officers, Orozco and Díaz Lozano, were arrested and subsequently convicted for "continued penetrative sexual abuse and threats". The sentence ruled that they serve their sentence at the National Center for Military Defendants in Ramo Verde, Miranda state.

=== Lieutenant José Gregorio León Sevilla Case ===
Lieutenant José Gregorio León Sevilla, who trained and served in the Bolivarian National Armed Forces for over seven years, faced significant repercussions because of his opposing views to the government of Nicolás Maduro. His story is a testament to the internal tensions and challenges members of the Bolivarian Technical Military Academy (BTMA) might face when dissenting from the government administration. During his service, León Sevilla attended numerous ideological meetings, where he regularly expressed his disagreement with the guidelines and opinions presented. Moreover, he spoke out against acts of corruption he had perceived. These actions put him on the radar of high-ranking military officials. It was the ATMB's brigadier general, Pablo Beltrán Pérez Villamizar, who made the decision to detain León Sevilla. Under his custody, the lieutenant faced restrictions that denied him contact with his family and limited his freedom of movement. In a surprising turn of events, his release was facilitated by a BTMA colleague responsible for the psychological evaluation of the military. This colleague issued a diagnosis stating that León Sevilla had mental health issues, which gave him an opportunity to visit his family. It was during this time that he made the decision to flee Venezuela. Despite the gravity of his situation, the lieutenant made the decisive action to leave his homeland without his family, fearing potential retaliation and the well-known tortures he might endure if arrested again. From his position abroad, León Sevilla has urged Juan Guaidó to adopt stronger measures and to unify efforts with other exiled military personnel in Colombia.
