= Military Academy of the Bolivarian Army =

Military Academy in Caracas Venezuela

- Academia Militar del Ejército Bolivariano
- Logo of the AMEB.
- Former name: Military Academy of Venezuela
- Motto: Cradle of the Bolivarian Revolution
- Type: Military
- Established: September 2, 1810
- Parent institution: Bolivarian Military University of Venezuela
- Affiliations: Armed Forces of Venezuela
- Superintendent: Divisional General Félix Osorio Guzmán
- Commandant of Cadets: COL Elpidio Jesús Pérez Chirinos
- Location: Caracas, Venezuela
- Colors: Blue and White
- Website: www.umbv.edu.ve/ameb/

The Military Academy of the Bolivarian Army (in Spanish Academia Militar del Ejército Bolivariano), previously called Military Academy of Venezuela, is an academy to train members of the officer corps of the National Army of the Bolivarian Republic of Venezuela, attached to Bolivarian Military University of Venezuela. It is also the oldest military academy in the country and one of the oldest in Latin America, having been founded on September 2, 1810.

Its campus is in Fort Tiuna in Caracas, shared with the National Guard Military Academy.

== Curriculum and academic programs ==
The MABA is a medium-sized, highly residential baccalaureate college, with a full-time, four-year undergraduate program that emphasizes instruction in the arts, sciences, and professions with no graduate program, preparing men and women to take on the challenge of being officers of the Venezuelan Army. The academy is accredited by the Ministry of Higher Education.

=== Academic program ===
The academic program consists of a structured core of subjects depending on the cadet's chosen specialty as a future Army officer, balanced between the arts and sciences. Regardless of major, all cadets graduate with a Bachelor of Science degree.

=== Military curriculum ===
As all cadets are commissioned as second lieutenants upon graduation, military and leadership education is nested with academic instruction. Military training and discipline fall under the purview of the Office of the Commandant of Cadets. Entering freshmen, or 4th class cadets, are referred to as New Cadets, and enter the academy on Reception Day (in October or November) to start off their military service training as future officers in Fort Tiuna, and are recognized as full cadets in a ceremony in March. The 2nd, 3rd and 4th years of study, aside from the usual academic work, also involve specialty training in the combat arms of the Army in their respective combat training schools. Selected cadets are also selected for foreign exchange studies in the military academies of Belarus, Bolivia, Nicaragua and Argentina.

The Academy also has links with military academies in Latin America and thus also has a sizable number of foreign exchange cadets who graduate as Second Lieutenants and with a bachelor's degree and thus return to their countries of origin to serve in their ground forces.

As the Corps of Cadets is structured into a Brigade, command of the Battalions and Companies fall under the responsibility of active duty officers in the rank of captain or major, unlike the academies in the US and UK and therefore following Prussian practice. There is also one senior Non-Commissioned Officer who acts as an assistant.

== Cadet life ==
Cadets are not referred to as freshmen, sophomores, juniors, or seniors. Instead they are officially called fourth class, third class, second class, and first class cadets. These are subdivided also into the Military Course (1st class) and the General Course cadets (4th through 2nd classes). These are distinguished by their use of either sabres and/or rifles per the Spanish and French influence (4th and 3rd class cadets, aside from sporting the rifles also carry daggers in their service uniforms), and by the color of their Pickelhaube plume on their Prussian blue full dress uniform: the MC cadets have red, while the GC cadets sport plumes by their year level (4th class - white, 3rd class - blue and 2nd class - gold), all of which reflect the colors of the Flag of Venezuela. The white plumed Pickelhaube is also worn by the officers. The year level designation is on the shoulder mark in blue with yellow stripes indicating year level. Variant service caps are also worn by female cadets, while peaked caps are used in the everyday uniform and in the service uniforms of the 4th and 3rd class cadets.

The brigade is organized into 2 battalions (1st Battalion Independence and 3rd Battalion Leander), and into the following ranks:

=== Rank insignia ===
==== For the General Course Cadets ====
- 1 Cadet Lance Corporal and 1 Cadet Corporal per class for the 4th and 3rd Classes, respectively
- and the following ranks for distinguished officer cadets of the GC:
  - 1 Cadet Corporal First Class (per section)
  - 1 Cadet Sergeant (per squad)
  - 1 Cadet Staff Sergeant (per platoon)
  - 1 Cadet Sergeant First Class (per company)

General Course
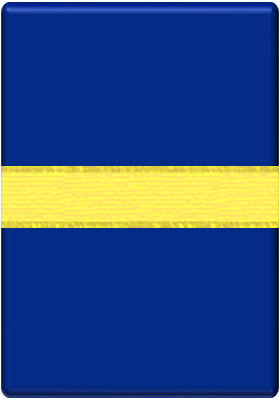
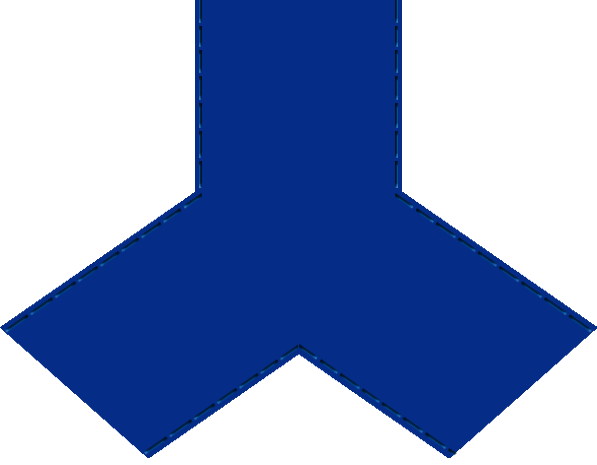
Cadet 4th Class	Sleeve mark
Shoulder mark	Cadet Lance Corporal

General Course
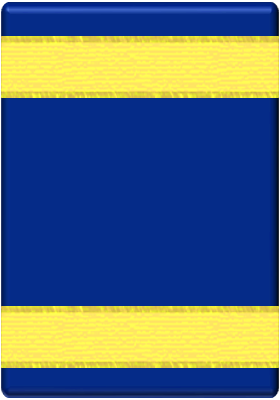
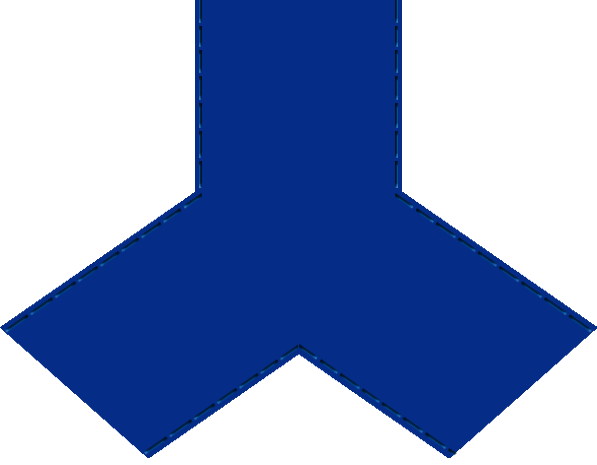
Cadet 3rd Class	Sleeve Mark
Shoulder mark	Cadet Corporal

General Course
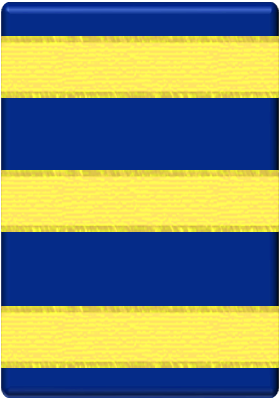
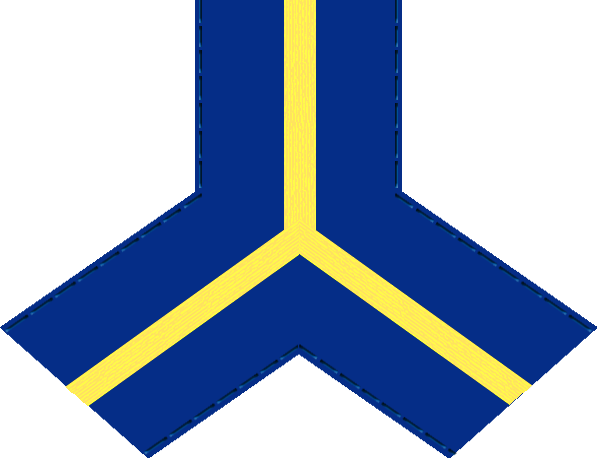
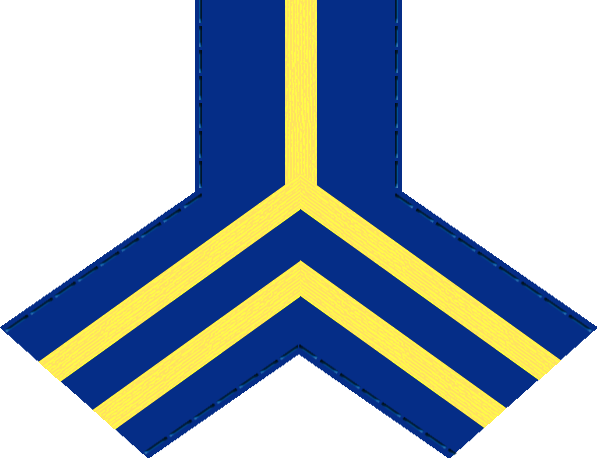
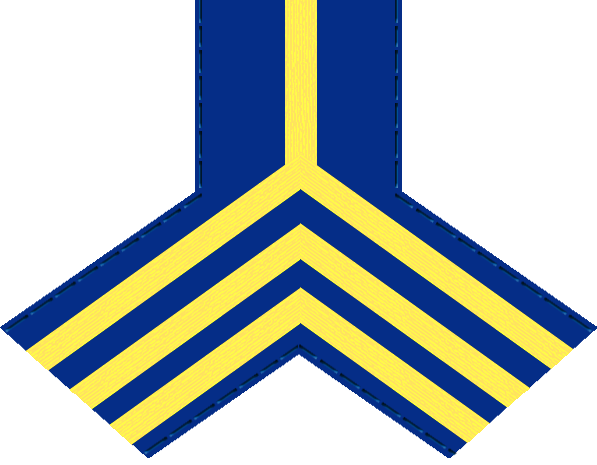
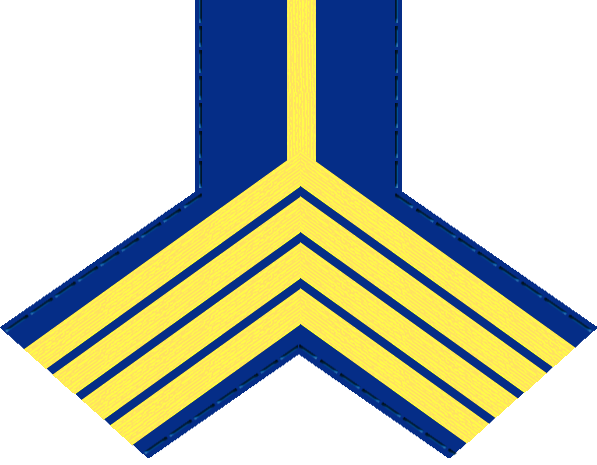
General shoulder board rank board	Sleeve Mark
Cadet 2nd Class	Cadet Lance Sergeant	Cadet Sergeant	Cadet Staff Sergeant	Cadet Sergeant First Class

==== For the Military Course Cadets (all Cadets 1st Class) ====
Aside from Cadets 1st Class and Cadet Master Sergeants, every Cadet Company has 1 Cadet First Sergeant and the battalions have 1 Cadet Sergeant Major each.

Military Course
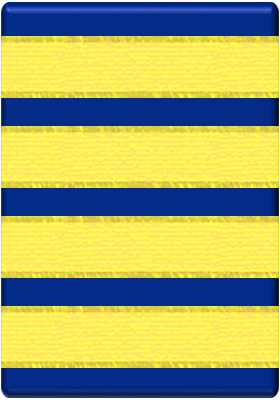
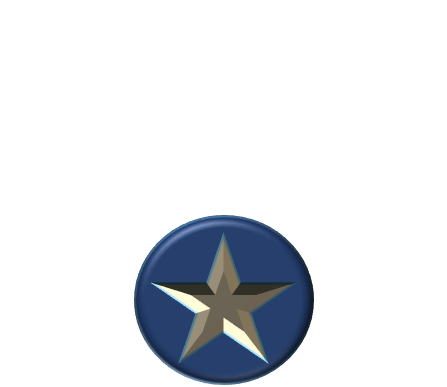
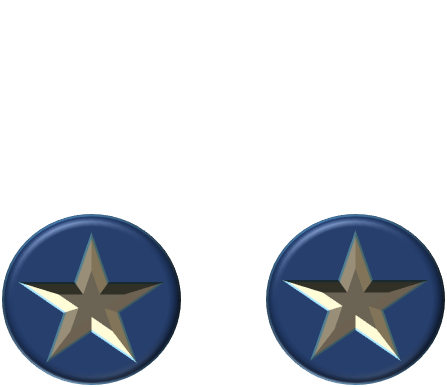
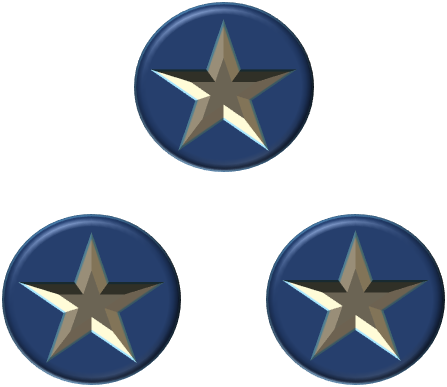
Cadets 1st Class	Collar appointment mark
General Shoulder mark	Cadet Master Sergeant	Cadet First Sergeant	Cadet Sergeant Major
