= Dictatorship of Juan Vicente Gómez =

1908–1935 government in Venezuela

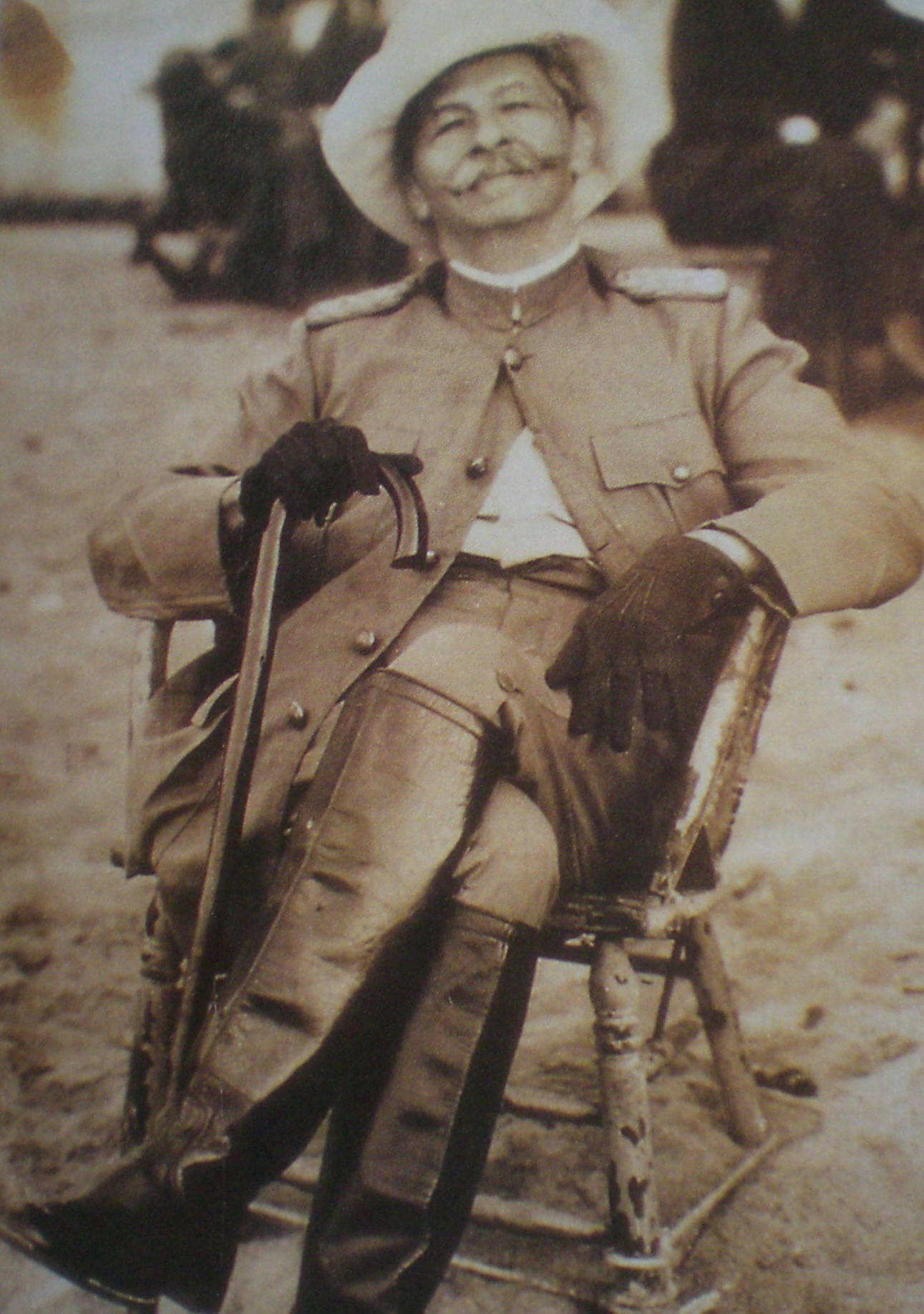
Juan Vicente Gómez

The dictatorship of Juan Vicente Gómez (also known as Gomecismo and self-named Rehabilitación) refers to the presidency of Juan Vicente Gómez and his subsequent puppet governments in Venezuela. It began after Gómez, then vice president, betrayed and overthrew Cipriano Castro in a 1908 coup d'état, ending Castro's dictatorship. The regime lasted 27 years until Gómez's death in 1935, following his fourth reelection.

Initially presenting itself as a government with democratic tendencies, Gómez abandoned this facade when faced with the possibility of losing the 1914 elections. He fabricated claims of a foreign invasion led by Castro and launched a crackdown on political opponents, solidifying his authoritarian rule by 1913.

The government promoted the constitutions of 1909, 1914, 1922, 1925, 1928, 1929 and 1931. Gómez also maintained control over the executive power during the presidencies of José Gil Fortoul, Victorino Márquez Bustillos, and Juan Bautista Pérez.

During this time, the modern state was consolidated in Venezuela, marked by the decline of the regional caudillos and the consolidation of the end of almost a century of civil wars. In 1913, the government lost control of the Amazonas territory following the assassination of its president (governor) and the establishment of the de facto government of Tomás Funes, who was executed seven years later by the anti-Gómez guerrilla Emilio Arévalo Cedeño.

Economically, this period saw the emergence of oil, which led to the beginning of the petroleum industry in the country through foreign investment, with the subsequent payoff of the external debt. By the 1920s, Venezuela was the world's leading oil exporter and the second-largest producer globally.

Foreign policy included the resolution of the Dutch-Venezuelan crisis of 1908 alongside the reestablishment of relations with the United States in 1913. Venezuela signed a non-belligerence treaty with Brazil in 1933. This government also led Venezuela during World War I, maintaining a neutral position.

The government was marked by severe repression. In Táchira alone, an estimated 20,000 people fled into exile. State security forces carried out widespread torture and forced disappearances, though the exact number remains unknown. Nationwide, hundreds of political prisoners were subjected to forced labor, including the construction of highways and public works.

== 1908 Venezuelan coup d'état ==
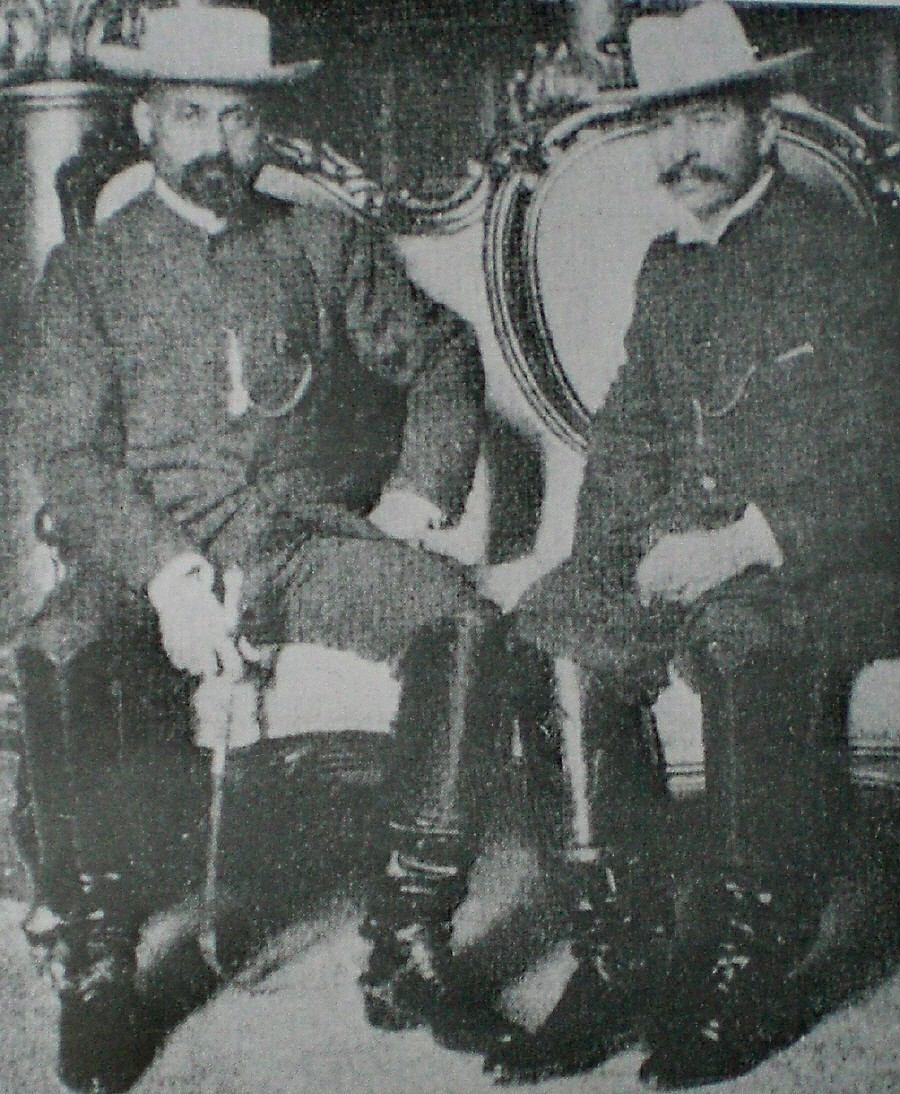
Cipriano Castro and Juan Vicente Gómez in 1900

Towards the end of Cipriano Castro's dictatorship, Venezuela became embroiled in a diplomatic crisis with the Dutch Crown, which had blockaded Venezuelan coasts. U.S. President Theodore Roosevelt requested congressional authorization to invade Venezuela, prompting Castro to sever diplomatic relations with the United States. During this period, Vice President Juan Vicente Gómez established secret communications with the U.S. government, seeking support for a planned conspiracy against Castro.

According to Gómez's Chancellor, Francisco González Guinán:

"In those difficult moments, Venezuela found itself with interrupted friendly relations with the Republic of Colombia, our sister in misfortunes and glory; with the United States of North America, which maintains its hegemony on the continent with its astonishing prosperity; with the French Republic, which has always given us its light and its experience, and with the Netherlands, whose neighboring colony is like an extension of our homeland. Additionally, we had certain disagreements with the Government of His Britannic Majesty arising from fiscal measures that affected their interests."

When Castro traveled to Berlin for health-related reasons, Gómez, who was acting president in Castro's absence, orchestrated a coup d'état with the assistance of Francisco Linares Alcántara Estévez, whom he later appointed to his cabinet. On the day of his inauguration, Gómez declared:

"With such collaborators I intend to give my government the national character it assumes, to make constitutional guarantees effective, to practice liberty within order, to respect the sovereignty of the States, to protect industries against odious conspiracies, and to let only the law rule with its indisputable sovereignty."

== Domestic policy ==
=== Legislative policy ===
Upon assuming power, Juan Vicente Gómez chose not to dissolve the Congress, maintaining the existing legislative structure. As a conciliatory measure, he ordered the release of 164 political prisoners detained under Cipriano Castro's regime and issued invitations for exiled dissidents to return to Venezuela.

Gómez consolidated a completely servile legislative structure to his government and to himself; the Gómez regime made use of approximately seven constitutional reforms to legalize its stay in power for 27 years.

==== Constitution of 1909 ====
In 1909, a new constitution was approved that reduced the presidential term to four years, and in 1910, Gómez was elected constitutional president by Congress. The rule of law ended in 1913, when Juan Vicente Gómez suspended constitutional guarantees and presidential elections, officially establishing a dictatorship in the country.

==== Presidency of José Gil Fortoul ====
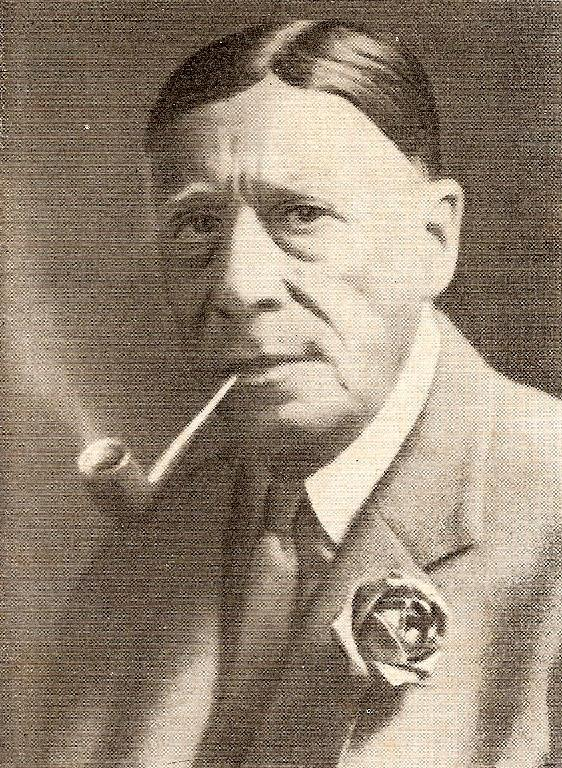
José Gil Fortoul

In 1913, José Gil Fortoul was appointed president of the Government Council while Juan Vicente Gómez dealt with uprisings against him, such as the revolt led by Horacio Ducharne and the conspiracy of Luis Rafael Pimentel. This made Gil Fortoul interim president until 1914.

==== Presidency of Victorino Márquez Bustillos and Constitutions of 1914 and 1922 ====
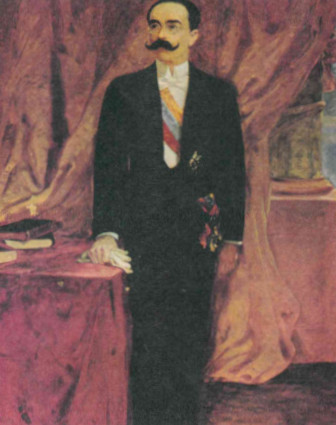
Victorino Márquez Bustillos

In April 1914, Juan Vicente Gómez was elected president of Venezuela by Congress. However, Gómez decided not to assume the presidency, remaining in Maracay as commander-in-chief of the national army. Under these circumstances, Victorino Márquez Bustillos, who had been named Provisional President, remained in office for seven years, resulting in Venezuela having two presidents simultaneously. The Provisional Constitutional Statute of 1914 was approved. The civil code was reformed in 1916.

In 1917, the Legislative Assembly named Maracay the capital of Aragua state.

New constitutions were promulgated in 1914 and 1922. The latter established two vice presidencies, which were occupied by Gómez's brother and son. The civil code was also reformed in 1922.

==== Constitutions of 1925 and 1928 ====
New constitutions were promulgated in 1925 and 1928. The first of these relegated power from the states to the executive, sealing the process of centralization. It reestablished the figure of a single vice president, who could fill temporary or absolute absences of the president, and also allowed the president to govern from anywhere in the country.

==== Presidency of Juan Bautista Pérez and Constitutions of 1929 and 1931 ====
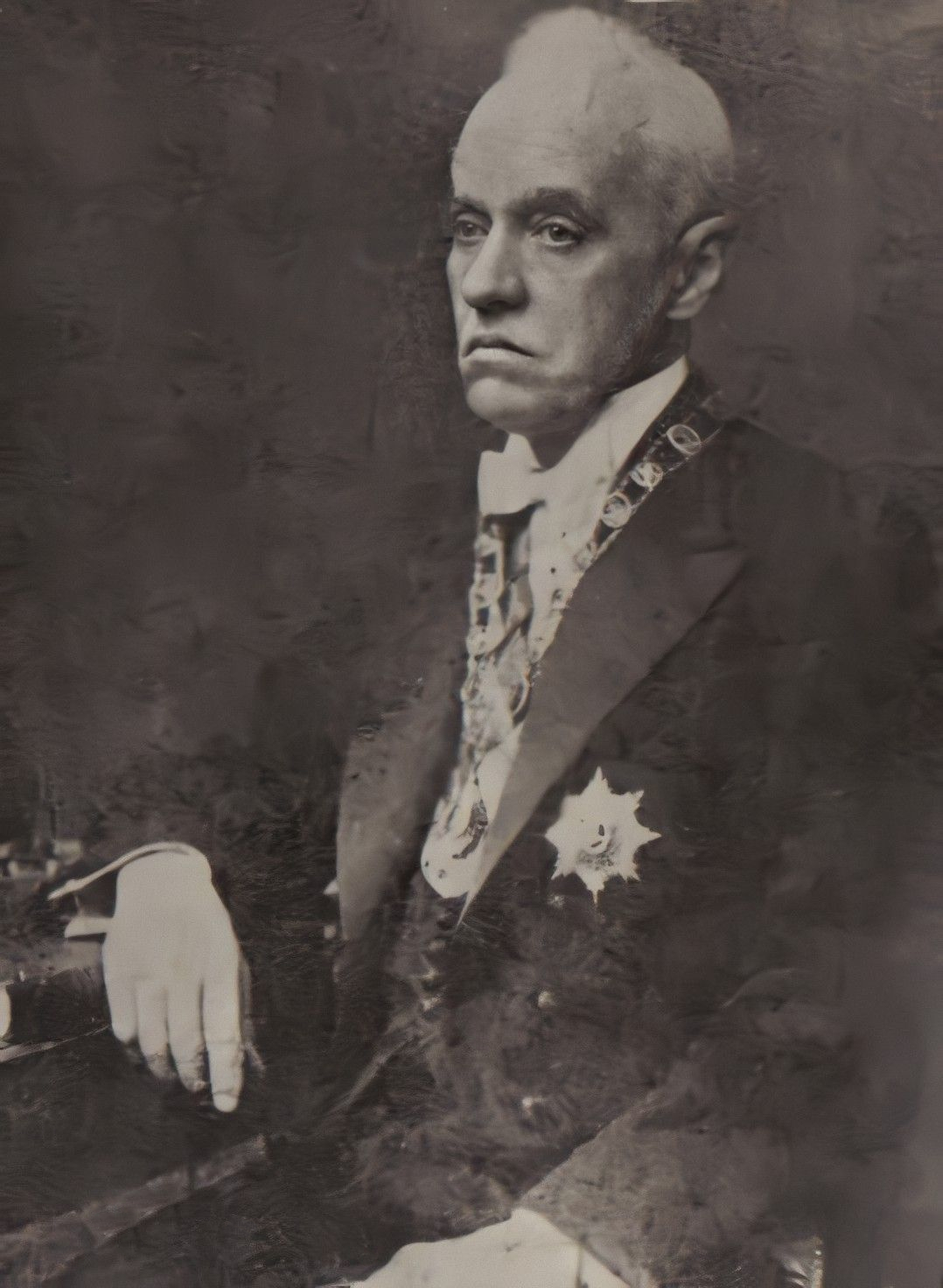
Juan Bautista Pérez

Juan Bautista Pérez was appointed president on May 30, 1929.

=== Judicial policy ===
Gómez established a judiciary completely servile to his government and to himself.

On July 24, 1925, Gómez offered a political amnesty that allowed the repatriation of some 20,000 exiles from Colombia. Two years later, a general amnesty was approved, but the protests initiated by the Generation of '28 led the regime to resume repressive measures.

Judge Abreu was imprisoned for upholding a 15-year prison sentence against Eustoquio Gómez, the dictator's cousin, after Gómez was convicted of murdering Governor Luis Mata Illas.

==== Torture ====
Eustoquio Gómez was later appointed warden of the San Carlos prison, where abuses became rampant. According to Colonel Rogelio Benavídez Pacheco, "The terror, torture, and even poisonings with crushed glass grew so extreme that the prisoners revolted, forcing Eustoquio to flee."

=== Tomás Funes' de facto rule in Amazonas ===
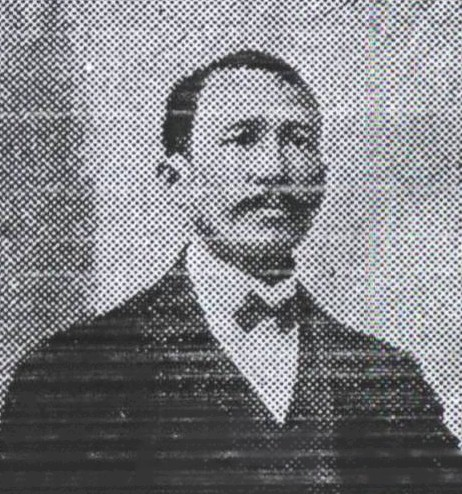
Tomás Funes.

On May 8, 1913, Colonel Tomás Funes and his accomplices carried out the assassination of Governor Roberto Pulido, his wife, and his children, as well as the massacre of dozens or even hundreds of people in what became known as the "Night of the Machetes." They also stormed the Government House of the Federal Territory of Amazonas in San Fernando de Atabapo, the state capital at the time. Gómez allowed these events, marking the beginning of Funes' bloody de facto rule over Amazonas for seven years. According to Funes' records, at least 480 murders were committed during this period, and indigenous inhabitants of the region were enslaved. Additionally, Funes' repressive actions led to the deaths of at least 2,000 Makiritare indigenous people. Funes' de facto rule in Amazonas lasted seven years until Gómez facilitated his capture by Emilio Arévalo Cedeño. Funes was subsequently tried, sentenced to death, and executed by firing squad, allowing Gómez to regain control over Amazonas.

=== Economics ===
During the Gomecismo period, Venezuela restored its foreign credit, which had been nonexistent due to the policies of his predecessor, Cipriano Castro. Investment was centralized and directed toward the petroleum industry. The country transitioned from an agricultural export economy to an oil-based one.

In 1919, the Commerce Code was reformed. In 1930, Gómez unilaterally ordered the full repayment of the country's external debt, while the internal debt was also greatly reduced during the Gómez government.

More than 60% of state revenues came from oil. The national budget for 1913 was approximately 30 million bolívars, growing to 200 million by the end of the 1920s.

=== Energy ===
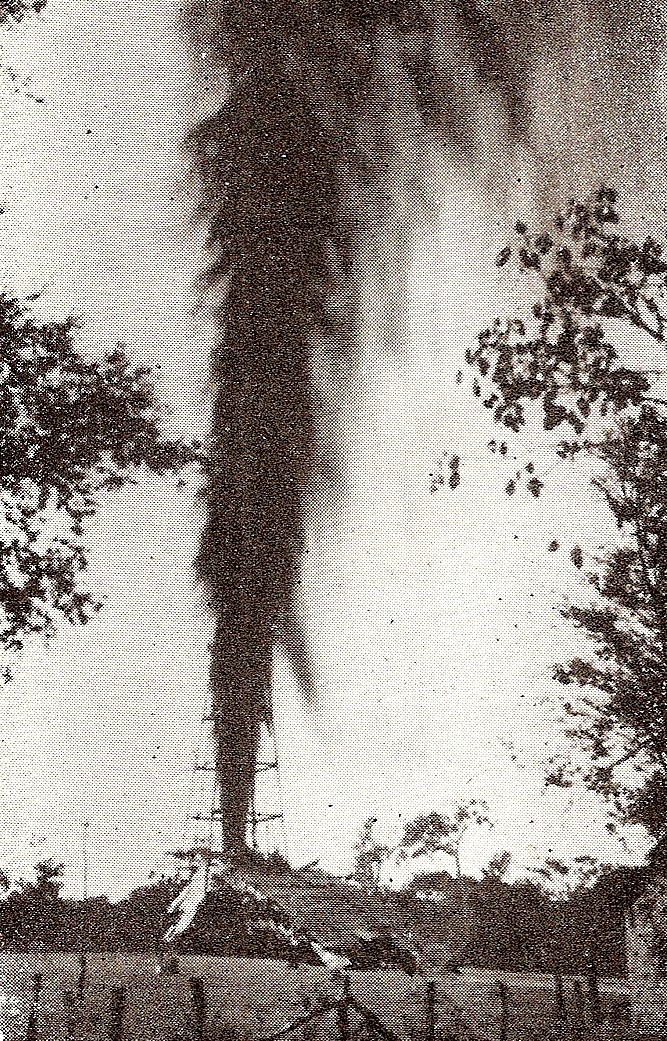
Barroso II oil field in 1922.

Oil concessions, previously revoked under Castro, were reinstated and granted to international oil monopolies. These companies received vast portions of national territory and operated under favorable conditions ensured by the dictatorship's repressive policies against dissent. Before World War I, the main beneficiaries of oil concessions were the Dutch and British industries, followed by the American industry after the end of the war.

Gómez held absolute authority to administer and grant oil concessions without congressional approval. During his regime, four major concessions were issued for exploration, production, and refining, primarily intended for resale to foreign investors. Initially, royalties were set at 7% for the Venezuelan state.

By 1917, annual oil production reached approximately 1.3 million barrels. By 1925, production neared 60 million barrels per year. In 1928, the figure stood at 137 million barrels annually (approximately 374,000 barrels per day).

In 1923, the Compañía Venezolana de Petróleo (CVP) was founded. Within less than fifteen years after the start of oil exploitation, by the end of the 1920s Venezuela had become the world's leading oil exporter and the second-largest oil producer in the world.

=== Infrastructure ===
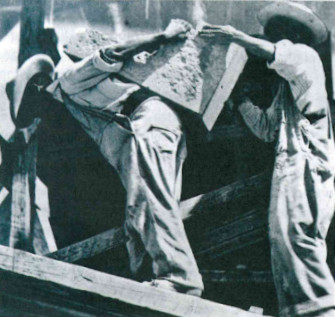
The dictatorship of Juan Vicente Gómez employed forced labor for the construction of public works and highways across Venezuela

Maracay was the city that benefited most during the Gómez dictatorship, receiving new urban developments, an airport, military bases, and a racetrack. It was the city where Gómez lived and from which he also governed. In the El Paraíso neighborhood of Caracas, where government families resided, the 19 de Diciembre Avenue was built. In Caracas, the National General Archive was also inaugurated. Simón Bolívar's house was rebuilt in 1910.

The road between Villa de Cura and San Juan de los Morros was repaired, and a road between San Juan de los Morros and Uverito was built, as well as the western Llanos highway connecting Caracas with San Cristóbal. During the dictatorship, hundreds of political prisoners were sent to work on road construction.

=== Education ===
In December 1908, a Chair of Dermatology and Syphilography was established at the Central University of Venezuela (UCV). However, in 1912, the UCV was closed by the government, and by 1914, the General Association of Students was banned.

=== Health ===
The 1918 Spanish flu reached Venezuela in October 1918 during its second global wave. The outbreak caused between 25,000 and 80,000 deaths nationwide.

The Gómez administration responded with minimal healthcare investment and implemented information censorship policies, restricting public reporting on the pandemic's severity.

=== Transportation ===
In 1930, the Línea Aeropostal Venezolana (LAV) was established, commencing operations in 1931.

=== Civil rights ===
During the presidency of Eustoquio Gómez in Táchira, more than 20,000 people from Táchira were forced into exile.

In 1922, the civil code was updated to include prison sentences for women who remarried less than ten months after being divorced or widowed. Same-sex relations were also criminalized with prison sentences. A decree issued by the dictatorship incarcerated homosexuals and men considered effeminate in the Isla del Burro Correctional Colony in Valencia.

=== Security ===
In 1914, a disarmament decree was promulgated in the Federal District, and later, in 1919, a disarmament law was decreed, ordering all firearm owners to hand over their weapons to the authorities; the only exceptions were machetes and hunting shotguns. The official justification was to reduce crime, but the law was ultimately used to disarm the population and prevent possible uprisings.

=== Immigration ===
On June 20, 1918, the immigration and colonization law was updated, specifying that "those persons who are not of European descent, or islanders of the yellow race in the northern hemisphere" would not be accepted.

Despite these efforts, non-white migrants continued to arrive in the country, while only a small number of Europeans came during the Gómez dictatorship. Venezuela still had a poor image in Europe; prior to the oil boom, the country faced high levels of poverty. Furthermore, Gómez felt little sympathy for foreigners who did not speak the language and were not Catholic; during his dictatorship, he was particularly hostile toward migration from Chinese and Arab populations.

Due to high levels of corruption, government-funded colonization programs did not benefit the Europeans who arrived in the country, but rather those close to the dictatorship, who secured a large number of lands for themselves.

=== Media policy ===
At that time, the country had a widespread telegraph system. Upon taking power, Gómez initially restored press freedom. However, in 1909 he shut down El Independiente after a caricature of Eustoquio Gómez; the same happened to Sancho Panza in 1911, and beginning in 1913 he initiated a harsh censorship campaign. Fru Frú, El Despertar, El Estudiante, and El Pregonero were eventually closed. Journalist Rafael Arévalo González was arrested after proposing Félix Monte as Juan Vicente Gómez's successor.

Following the assassination of Juancho Gómez, writer Job Pim and cartoonist Leoncio Martínez, the directors of the humorous weekly Fantoches, which had been founded that same year, were arrested, and Gómez ordered the publication closed after those detentions.

== Foreign policy ==
The William Howard Taft administration in the United States promptly recognized Juan Vicente Gómez's government in 1908, providing critical support that prevented Cipriano Castro from regaining power.

One of Gómez's first actions was reversing Castro's tariff policies on 21 December 1908. This diplomatic shift yielded immediate results: within two days, the Netherlands withdrew its warships from Venezuelan waters, ending the naval blockade.

Venezuela's political argument for neutrality was based on the Code of the 2 Duties and Rights of Neutrals, within the framework of the Hague Conventions of 1889 and 1907.

== Corruption ==
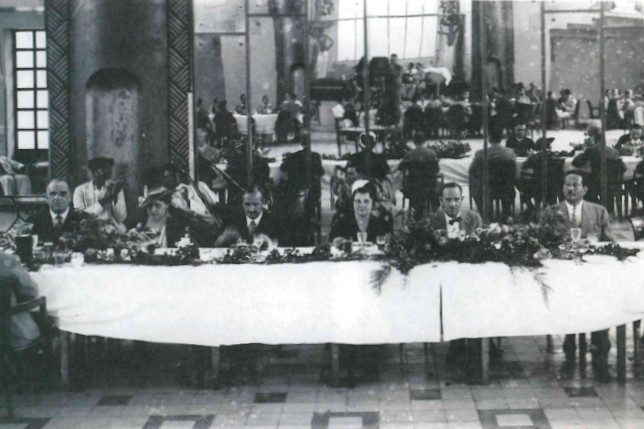
Juan Vicente Gómez was accustomed to hosting banquets for family members and close friends at the Paraíso airfield

Between 1908 and 1920, Juan Vicente Gómez became the owner of large tracts of land in and around Maracay. Among his holdings by state were 45 houses and 35 land lots (Federal District); at least 15 pasturelands (Apure); 450 houses, 70 estates, 30 land lots, and 160 haciendas (Aragua); Caigüire Island in Lake Valencia, 20 houses and 90 haciendas, along with Chambergo, Del Burro, and Otama islands in the same lake (Carabobo); 50 haciendas and 25 houses (Guárico); and 28 haciendas (Cojedes). He also owned properties in Miranda, Monagas, Sucre, Táchira, Yaracuy, and Zulia. According to the Encyclopædia Britannica, Gómez became the wealthiest citizen in all of Venezuela.

Uruguayan historian Eduardo Galeano wrote that "the king of the concessions carnival was dictator Juan Vicente Gómez, a rancher from the Andes who spent his twenty-seven years in power (1908–35) fathering children and making deals. While torrents of black gold gushed forth, Gómez pulled oil shares from his bulging pockets and rewarded his friends, relatives, and courtiers with them."

Rómulo Betancourt defined gomecismo as a tyranny "incapable of reforming the economic structure or of using oil, even the meager royalties received at that time, as a lever to drive collective progress or to distribute well-being and culture among the population," and referred to Gómez as a "detestable thief." Rafael Caldera, in his book Los causahabientes, wrote that "Gómez confused his personal fortune with the coffers of the Republic."

== Succession ==
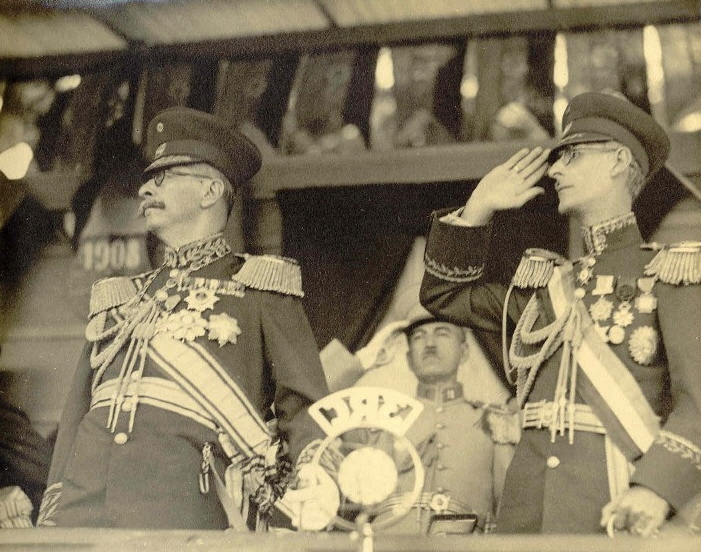
Juan Vicente Gómez and López Contreras in Maracay, 1934

In 1931, Eleazar López Contreras was named Minister of War and Navy. In 1935, Juan Vicente Gómez's health began to deteriorate, and he finally died in Maracay on December 17 of that year, ending 27 years of the Gómez dictatorship.

Several authors point out that Gómez had considered Diógenes Escalante as his successor. Minister Eleazar López Contreras was named interim president and, after the 1936 Venezuelan presidential election, constitutional president.

In 1936, Congress ordered the confiscation of the assets of Juan Vicente Gómez and all his ministers.

== Ideology and symbology ==
Juan Vicente Gómez's motto when he took power was "Unión, Paz y Trabajo" (Union, Peace and Work). Gómez also exercised local control over the Catholic Church in Venezuela.

=== Anti-partisanship ===
The interested literature of the Gómez regime presented the conservatives and liberals as those responsible for the civil wars, and the political parties as those responsible for the backwardness, instability and corruption.

=== Anticommunism ===
The regime was anti-communist, establishing in the 1909 Constitution the prohibition of communist propaganda.

=== Cult of Simón Bolívar ===
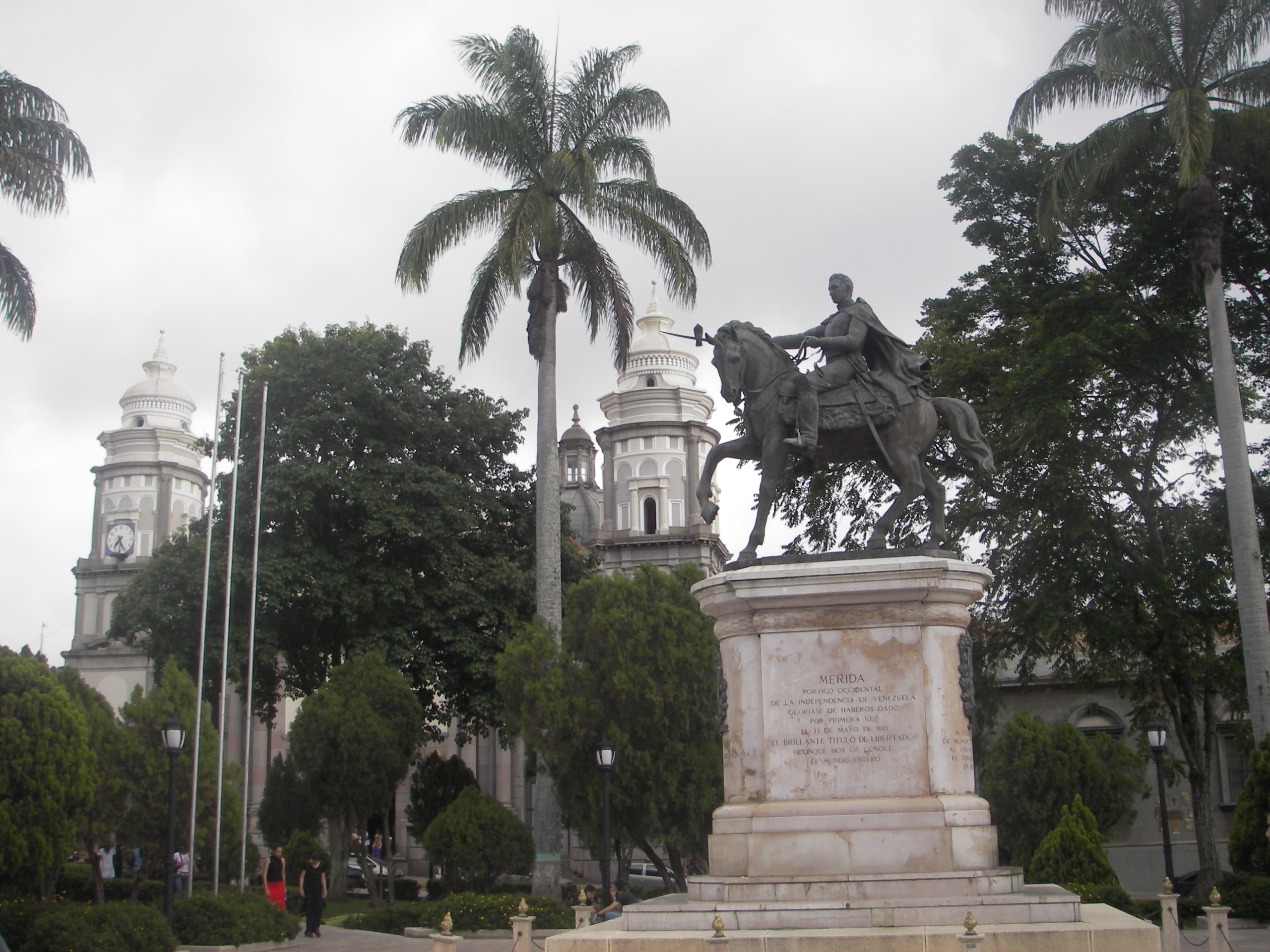
Statue of Simón Bolívar

Gómez continued and deepened the cult of Simón Bolívar, inaugurating his monuments, such as the one in the Plaza Bolívar in Mérida. In addition, he changed his date of birth so that it coincided with Bolívar's date of birth, and made this supposed coincidence public knowledge, announcing that he would also die on the same day as him, which was announced on December 17, 1935, which, in effect, was the anniversary of Bolívar's death.

=== Change of the national flag ===
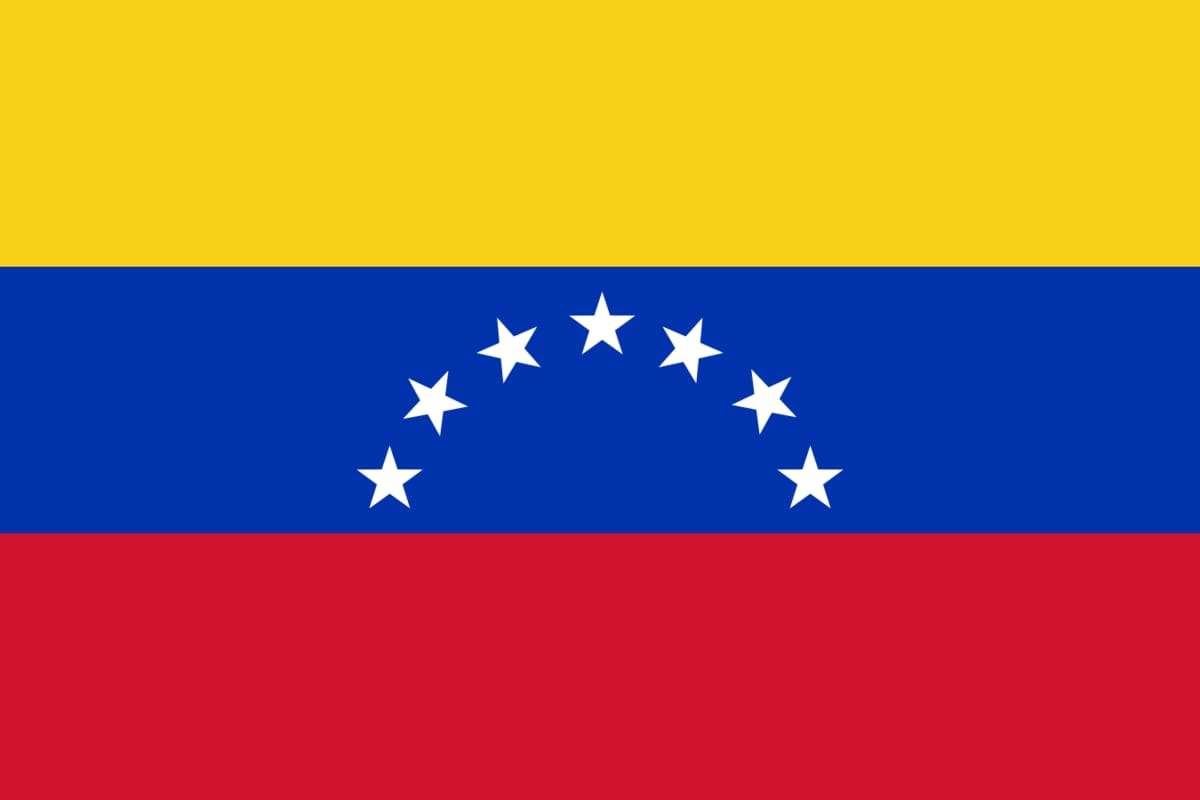
The flag of Venezuela was changed in 1930

Through a decree of July 15, 1930 issued by the National Congress, the country's flag was modified, changing the arrangement of the seven stars in the shape of a circumference to another in the shape of an arc.

== Opposition ==
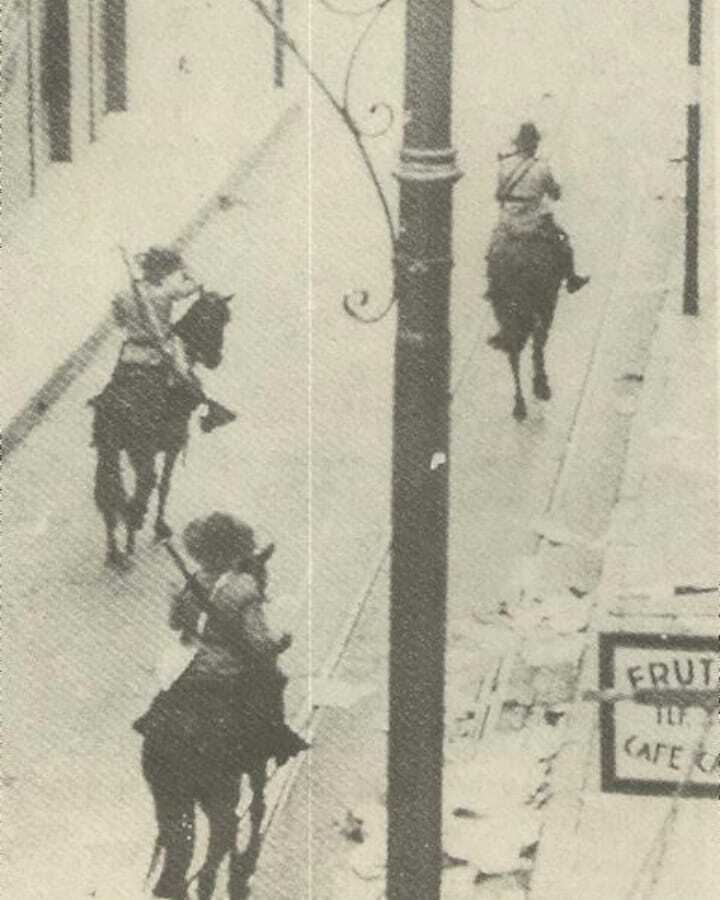
La Sagrada

In 1931, political parties began to emerge clandestinely. The first was the Communist Party of Venezuela, which was constitutionally outlawed due to a prohibition of communism in the country. Subsequently, the Agrupación Revolucionaria de Izquierda (ARDI) emerged, led by Rómulo Betancourt, who, along with other exiles, signed the Barranquilla Plan.

During the Gómez dictatorship, thousands of Venezuelans went into exile, and hundreds of political prisoners were sent to work on road construction, as was the case with the construction of the Trasandina Highway in the Venezuelan Andes. In late 1918 and early 1919, students and a large part of civil society demonstrated against the Gómez government; these demonstrations were suppressed, with most of their leaders ending up in prison or exile. Many political prisoners were sent to La Rotunda to perform forced labor. One of the cruelest torturers in that prison was Nereo Pacheco.

== See also ==
- 1908 Venezuelan coup d'état
- La Sagrada (Venezuela)
- Dictatorship of Cipriano Castro
- Presidency of Eleazar López Contreras
