= Presidency of Eleazar López Contreras =

Venezuelan presidential term

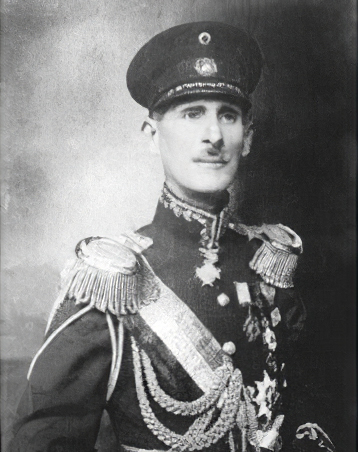
Eleazar López Contreras

The presidency of Eleazar López Contreras was a post‑Gómez transitional government in a Venezuela without political parties, with Congress ratifying López Contreras as interim president in 1935 to complete Gómez's term after his death, and electing him constitutional president in 1936 until 1941 with 121 out of 122 votes, so that legally they were two governments. Considered a hybrid regime, it was the third government of the period known as the Andean Hegemony, led by presidents born in Táchira state.

López Contreras was conservative ideologically. In legislative terms, the 1936 Constitution was approved. López Contreras's economic policy was protectionist, also creating the Central Bank of Venezuela and signing a free trade treaty with the United States.

He was the founder of the National Guard. López Contreras's government presided over the first part of World War II, declaring a neutral position in 1939.

The February 14, 1936, demonstration was decisive for his democratic opening at the electoral level, carrying out in 1937 the first elections of the 20th century in which the opposition to the government participated, maintaining an anti-communist stance. President López Contreras encouraged the return of political opponents of the Gómez regime and later exiled several of their main leaders, outlawing political parties.

After his term, he supported the succession of his Minister of War and Navy, Isaías Medina Angarita, with the hope of succeeding him in a second government, but the latter distanced himself from his mentor. After the coup d'état against his successor in 1945, the Jury of Civil and Administrative Responsibility was established to investigate corruption related to the Gómez and post-Gómez governments, including that of López Contreras. Due to his presidential term, after the establishment of the 1961 constitution, he was appointed senator for life, a position he held until his death.

== Background ==
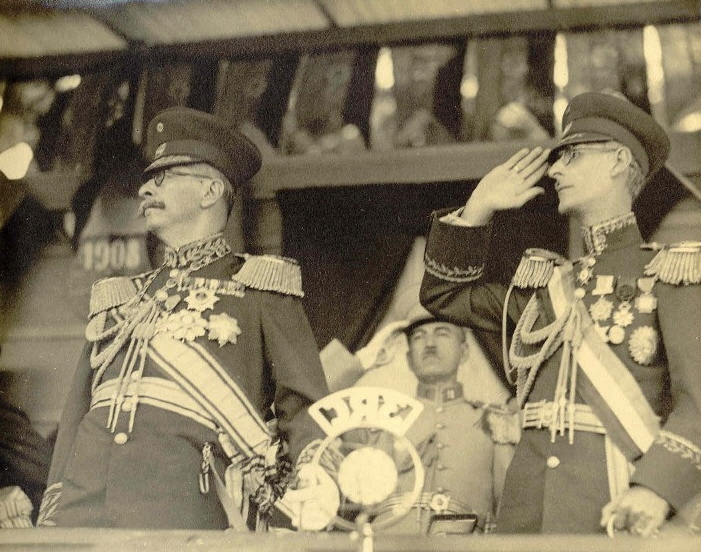
Juan Vicente Gómez and López Contreras in Maracay, 1934

Dictator Juan Vicente Gómez was 77 years old at the beginning of 1935, was ill, and there was an internal conspiracy in the government vying for his succession, particularly involving Eustoquio Gómez. Several authors indicate that Gómez had thought of Diógenes Escalante as his successor.

When Gómez died in December 1935, the cabinet met and selected General Eleazar López Contreras, Minister of War and Navy, to finish Gómez's term, which legally ended in 1936. Congress ratified López Contreras as interim president in 1935 and as constitutional president after the 1936 elections.

== Cabinet ==
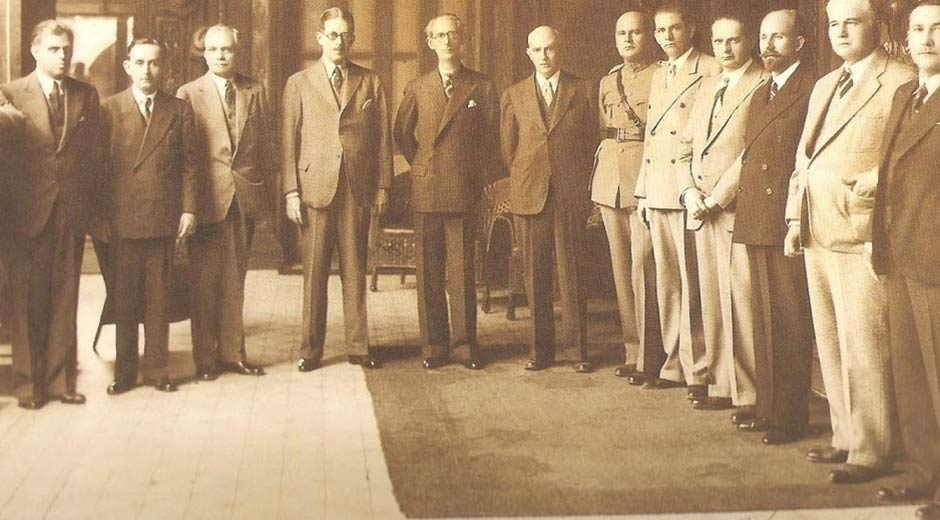
López Contreras and his cabinet in 1936

Cabinet
OFFICE	NAME	TERM
President	Eleazar López Contreras	1935–1941
Interior Affairs	Pedro Tinoco Smith	1935–1936
Interior Affairs	Diógenes Escalante	1936
Interior Affairs	Alejandro Lara Núñez	1936
Interior Affairs	Régulo Olivares	1936–1937
Interior Affairs	Alfonso Mejía	1937–1938
Interior Affairs	Luis Gerónimo Pietri	1938–1941
Foreign Affairs	Pedro Itriago Chacín	1935–1936
Foreign Affairs	Esteban Gil Borges	1936–1941
Finance	Efraim González	1935–1936
Finance	Gustavo Herrera	1936
Finance	Alejandro Lara Núñez	1936
Finance	Alberto Adriani	1936
Finance	Cristóbal L. Mendoza	1937–1938
Finance	Francisco J. Parra	1938–1941
War and Navy	Antonio Chalbaud Cardona	1935–1936
War and Navy	Isaías Medina Angarita	1936–1941
Development	Pedro París	1936
Development	Néstor Luis Pérez	1936–1938
Development	Manuel Egaña	1938–1941
Public Works	Antonio Díaz	1935–1936
Public Works	Tomás Pacaninis	1936–1938
Public Works	Enrique Jorge Aguerrevere	1938–1941
Public Instruction	R. González Rincones	1935–1936
Public Instruction	José Ramón Ayala	1936
Public Instruction	Caracciolo Parra Pérez	1936
Public Instruction	Rómulo Gallegos	1936
Public Instruction	Alberto Smith	1936–1937
Public Instruction	Rafael Ernesto López	1937–1938
Public Instruction	Enrique Tejera Guevara	1938–1939
Public Instruction	Arturo Uslar Pietri	1939–1941
Sanitation and Agriculture	R. González Rincones	1935–1936
Health and Social Welfare	Enrique Tejera Guevara	1936
Health and Social Welfare	Santos Dominici	1936–1937
Health and Social Welfare	Honorio Sigala	1937–1938
Health and Social Welfare	Julio García Álvarez	1938–1941
Agriculture	Alberto Adriani	1936
Agriculture	Alfonso Mejía	1936–1937
Agriculture	Hugo Parra Pérez	1937–1938
Agriculture	Amenodoro Rangel Lamus	1938–1939
Agriculture	Alfonso Mejía	1939–1941
Communications	Francisco H. Rivero	1936
Communications	Honorio Sigala	1936
Communications	Alejandro Lara	1936–1937
Communications	Luis Gerónimo Pietri	1937–1938
Communications	Héctor Cuenca	1938–1939
Communications	José Rafael Pocaterra	1939–1941
Secretary of the Presidency	Amenodoro Rangel	1935-1936
Secretary of the Presidency	Francisco Parra	1936
Secretary of the Presidency	Diógenes Escalante	1936–1938
Secretary of the Presidency	Alfonso Mejía	1938–1939
Secretary of the Presidency	Tulio Chiossone	1939−1941
Secretary	Amenodoro Rangel Lamus	1935-1937

== Domestic policy ==
=== Legislative policy ===
==== Constitution of 1936 ====
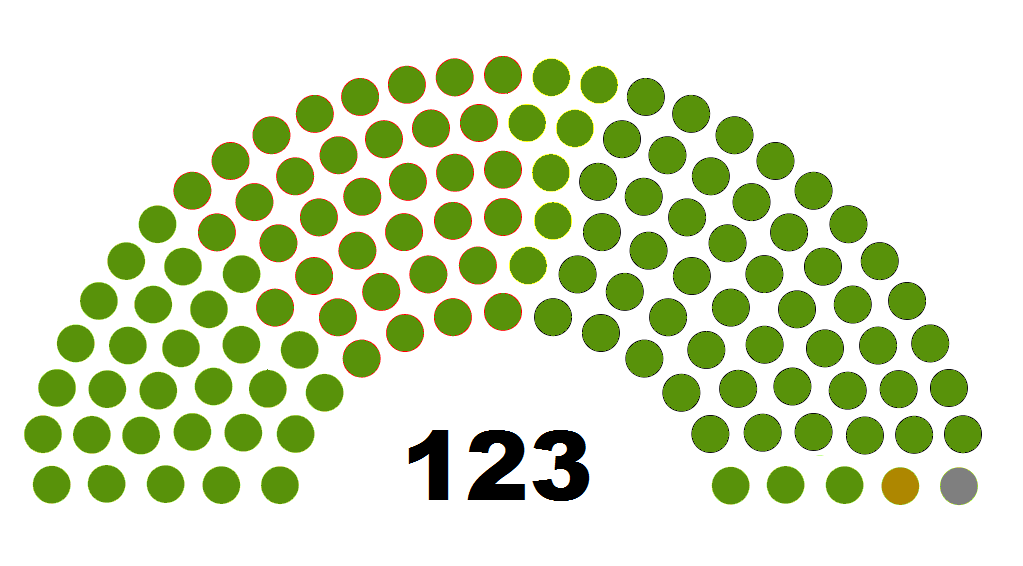
Congress after the 1936 elections, in green the ruling party

The Venezuelan Constitution was approved on July 16, 1936, during the presidency of Eleazar López Contreras. Its importance lies in being the first political constitution of the State after the dictatorship of Juan Vicente Gómez. Although it put an end to the personalistic character of its predecessors, initially it had more restrictive characteristics than the seven Gómez-era constitutions, until April 23, 1945, when President Isaías Medina Angarita promoted a reform.

The presidential term was reduced from seven to five years, eliminating immediate reelection. The constitution limited voting to men over 21 years of age who could read, at a time when more than half of Venezuelans could not read.

=== Judicial policy ===
==== Release of political prisoners and return of exiles ====
On December 20, 1935, General López Contreras ordered the release of all political prisoners and detainees from the Gómez dictatorship, many of whom were engaged in forced labor for road construction, as well as the provision for the return of exiles and banished persons.

=== Defense ===
The government of López Contreras signified a military continuism of the Gómez regime; transforming itself into a new power elite based on military prestige and command relationships inherited from Gómez.

=== Economics ===
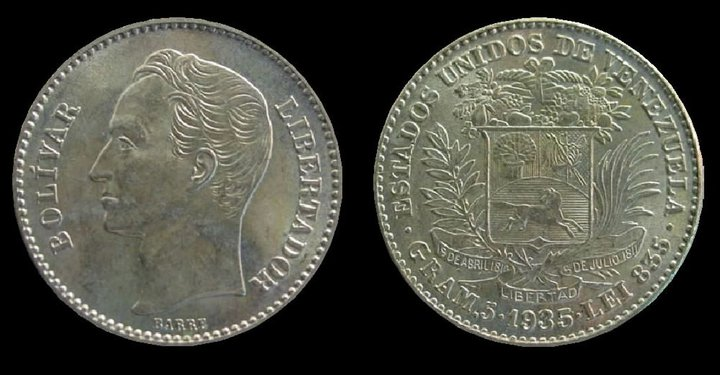
1 silver bolívar coin of 1935

López Contreras's economic policy was protectionist. In 1936, Congress ordered the confiscation of the assets of Juan Vicente Gómez and all his ministers. On October 13, 1936, the Customs Tariff Law was approved, a project of Minister Alberto Adriani. In 1938, the Comptroller General of the Republic was created. In November 1939, a free trade treaty with the United States was established. The Central Bank of Venezuela was also founded in 1940.

=== Energy ===
Royal Dutch Shell, Standard Oil, and Gulf Oil were the major oil companies in Venezuela when López became president. An export tax on oil shipped from Venezuela was prohibited by the pre-1936 constitution, but this was omitted in the 1936 constitution. Oil concessions to private people was ended by López in 1938.

Petroleum workers started striking in the Maracaibo region on 11 December 1936, and this continued until it was ended by a presidential degree from López on 22 January 1937. There was a 39% decrease in oil production during the strike and 6.5 million bolívares lost. Oil companies instituted some reforms such as increasing the wages to 8 bolívares a day and improving living conditions.

=== Electoral policy ===
In 1937, municipal elections were held, the first elections of the 20th century in which the opposition to the government participated; however, the Federal and Cassation Court annulled the elections. In February of that year, left‑wing parties were outlawed, including ORVE, FEV-OP, PRP, Frente Obrero, and Frente Nacional were outlawed.

=== Health policy ===
On February 25, 1936, the Ministry of Health, Agriculture and Livestock was divided into two, giving rise to the Ministry of Health and Social Assistance. It also established the National Institute of Childcare.

=== Labor ===
On July 16, 1936, the Labor Law was approved, granting workers the right to collective association and to strike. López Contreras maintained a confrontation with the labor movement and its political leaders, who demonstrated in successive strikes such as that of 1936. By orders of military officer Elbano Mibelli on March 26, 1939, the Workers' Trade Union Federation (FST) and the General Union of Labor (UGT) were banned, accused of being communist.

=== Infrastructure ===
The Monumental Plan of Caracas was designed.

=== Education ===
In October 1936, the Pedagogical Institute was founded, and in January 1937, teacher education programs were established. That same year, the Central University of Venezuela (UCV) was raided.

=== Agricultural policy ===
The Ministry of Agriculture and Livestock was created, dividing the Ministry of Health, Agriculture and Livestock. In 1936, the National Coffee Institute was founded.

=== Human Rights ===
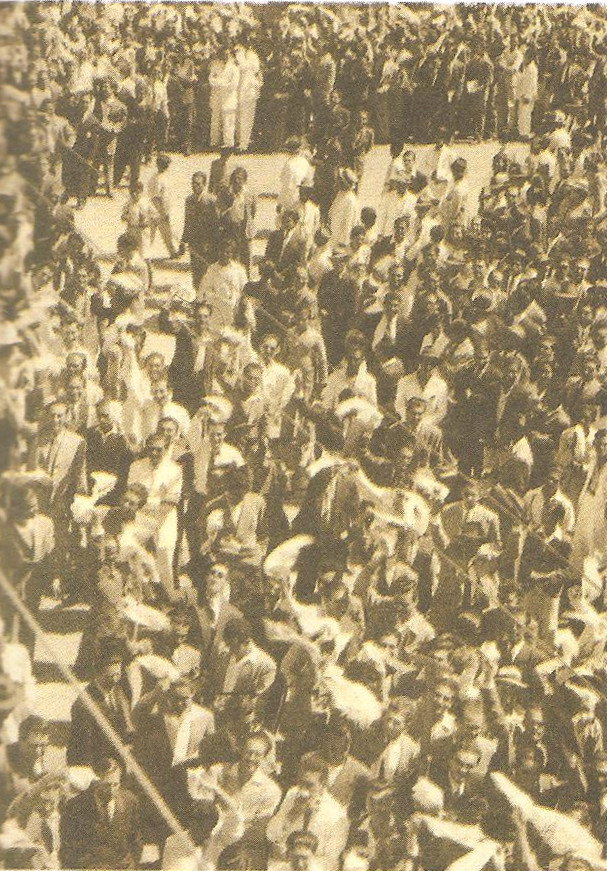
February 1936 demonstration

At the beginning of 1936, various violent protests occurred in Maracaibo and Cabimas, generating looting and causing seven deaths. Meanwhile, in Valencia and Caracas, demonstrations degenerated into looting. In response to these events, the regime suspended constitutional guarantees on January 6, 1936.

The February 14, 1936, demonstration was repressed, resulting in six dead and nearly 150 wounded. Following the repression of the demonstration, a series of altercations and looting occurred, leading to the removal and arrest of Governor Galavís and the subsequent restoration of guarantees.

That same year, Alejandro Lara was appointed Minister of Interior, who promoted the approval of the Public Order Law, better known as the Lara Law. The law prohibited strikes and work stoppages, authorized the use of firearms to end protests, allowed the search of homes without a court order, and legalized the expulsion of citizens from the nation.

Over the years, social conflict persisted, degenerating into government repression. In 1936, the militarization of the city of Valencia occurred by order of Colonel F. Celestino Hernández due to a strike by telegraph office workers. In 1937, the headquarters of the FEV (Venezuelan Student Federation) located in the Central University of Venezuela was raided, causing the death of student Eutimio Rivas.

Additionally, a series of detentions of activists and politicians took place, including Gustavo Machado, Salvador de la Plaza, Carlos D'Ascoli, Jesús González, Luis Hernández Solís, Luis Francisco Troconis, Hernani Portocarrero, and others.

Due to the repressive attitude, some organizations began to emerge to denounce abuses. In 1937, relatives of political detainees founded the National Pro-Prisoners League, an organization responsible for offering help and assistance to detainees; however, authorities prevented its legalization on several occasions. Meanwhile, in 1938, Father Manuel Aguirre Elorriaga founded Revista SIC (Seminario Interdiocesano de Caracas), influenced by the Christian Workers' Youth. This publication would become one of the first windows for the dissemination of information about human rights in Venezuela and the social doctrine of the Church.

In 1939, the Vagrancy and Misconduct Law entered into force. Although it did not explicitly criminalize homosexuality, it left the door open for the detention of persons suspected of any "threat to society." The concept of "vagrants" was not clearly defined and included unemployed persons or those who "walk the streets (...) fostering idleness and other vices."

=== Security ===
In August 1937, the National Security Service was established.

=== Media policy ===
==== Censorship ====
On January 28, 1936, the Governor of the Federal District, Félix Galavís, created a Censorship Office within the governor's office. Galavís decreed the prohibition of communist propaganda, the posting of posters, and press articles without prior administrative authorization. Following the February 14, 1936, demonstration, President Contreras removed Galavís from office and reversed the censorship decree.

==== Red Book ====
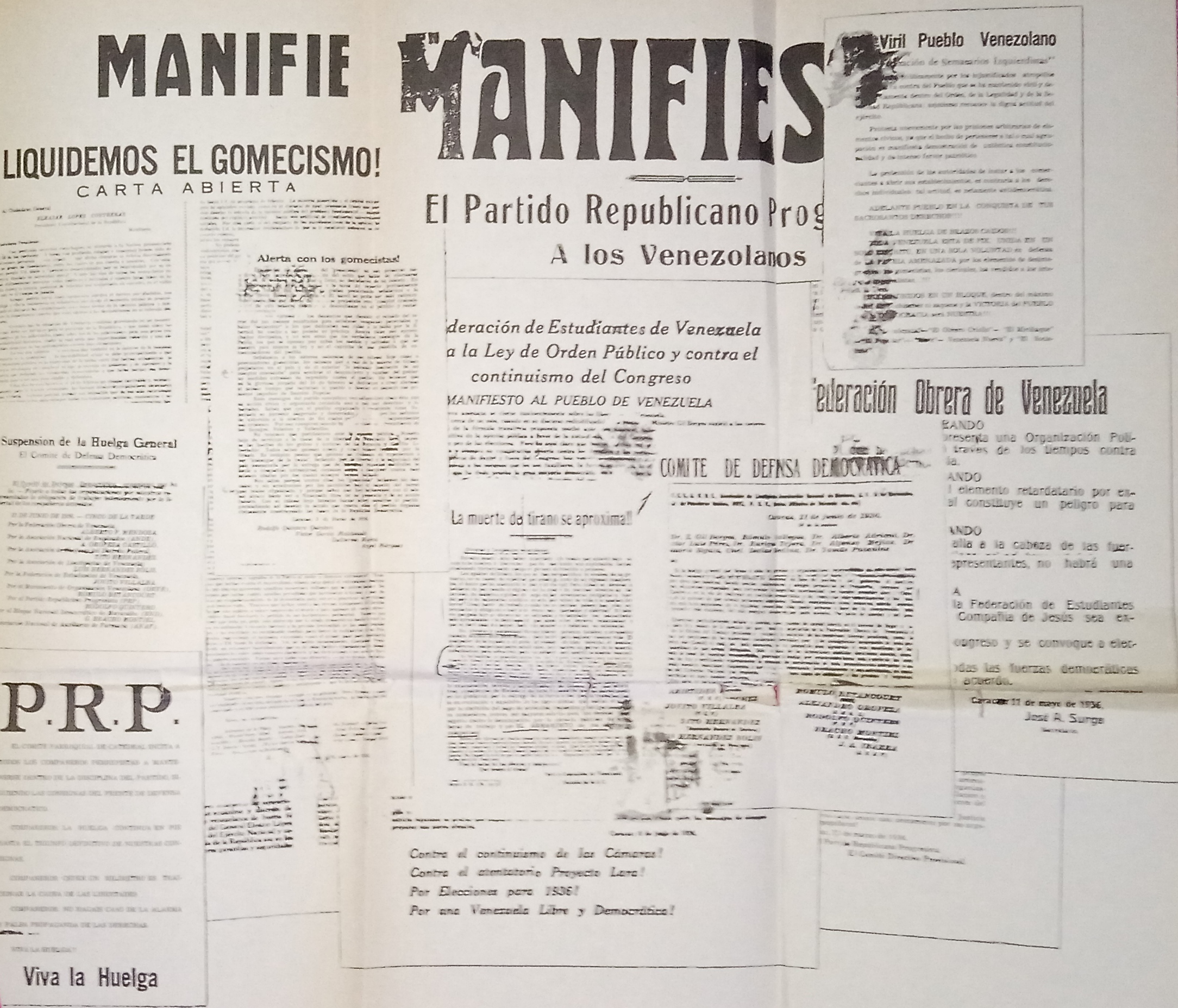
Documents shown in the Red Book

In 1936, the newspapers Orve and El Popular announced the appearance of a book called "La verdad de las actividades comunistas en Venezuela" (The Truth about Communist Activities in Venezuela), popularly known thereafter as the Red Book, whose author was unknown. It was a compendium of names of persons accused of being communists (including real communists and ex-communists at that time). Mentioned were the Secretary of Government of the Federal District, the Prefect of the Capital Department, and the private secretary of the governor, Elbano Mibelli, as well as the Barranquilla Plan, linking the signatories to communism, including Rómulo Betancourt and other participants grouped as the Movimiento de Organización Venezolana.

This resulted in a political scandal and unleashed a witch hunt; Betancourt was persecuted and remained underground. Eventually, it was demonstrated that the Red Book was linked to the government of Eleazar López Contreras.

=== Immigration ===
Immigration policy since Juan Vicente Gómez was influenced by positivism, an ideology that continued to determine the migration policies of the López Contreras government.

== Foreign policy ==
=== World War II ===
During the government of López Contreras, World War II broke out. López Contreras himself stated on the matter:

"Before that conflict, the Ministry of Foreign Affairs had completed its studies on neutrality and its evolution in recent times, also defining the situation of the Republic, taking into account its international commitments and its vital interests. Immediately after receiving notification of the existence of a state of war between some European powers, the Government of Venezuela, by Decree of September 4, 1939, declared its strict neutrality."

The government declared itself neutral on September 4, 1939.

=== Colombia ===
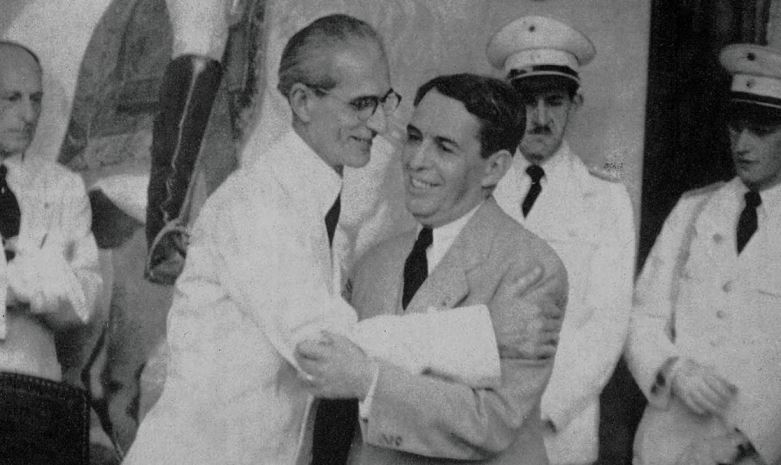
Eleazar López Contreras and Colombian president Eduardo Santos, 1941

The Treaty on the Demarcation of Borders and Navigation of Common Rivers with Colombia was signed.

== Legacy ==
=== 1941 presidential election ===
Several authors indicate that Juan Vicente Gómez had thought of Diógenes Escalante as his successor; according to writer Francisco Suniaga, he would also have been López Contreras's first choice, but the military leadership forced him to choose a military officer. In 1941, Isaías Medina Angarita, former Minister of War under López Contreras, was elected by Congress. General López Contreras expected to receive the presidency again, after Medina Angarita's government.

=== Jury of Civil and Administrative Responsibility ===
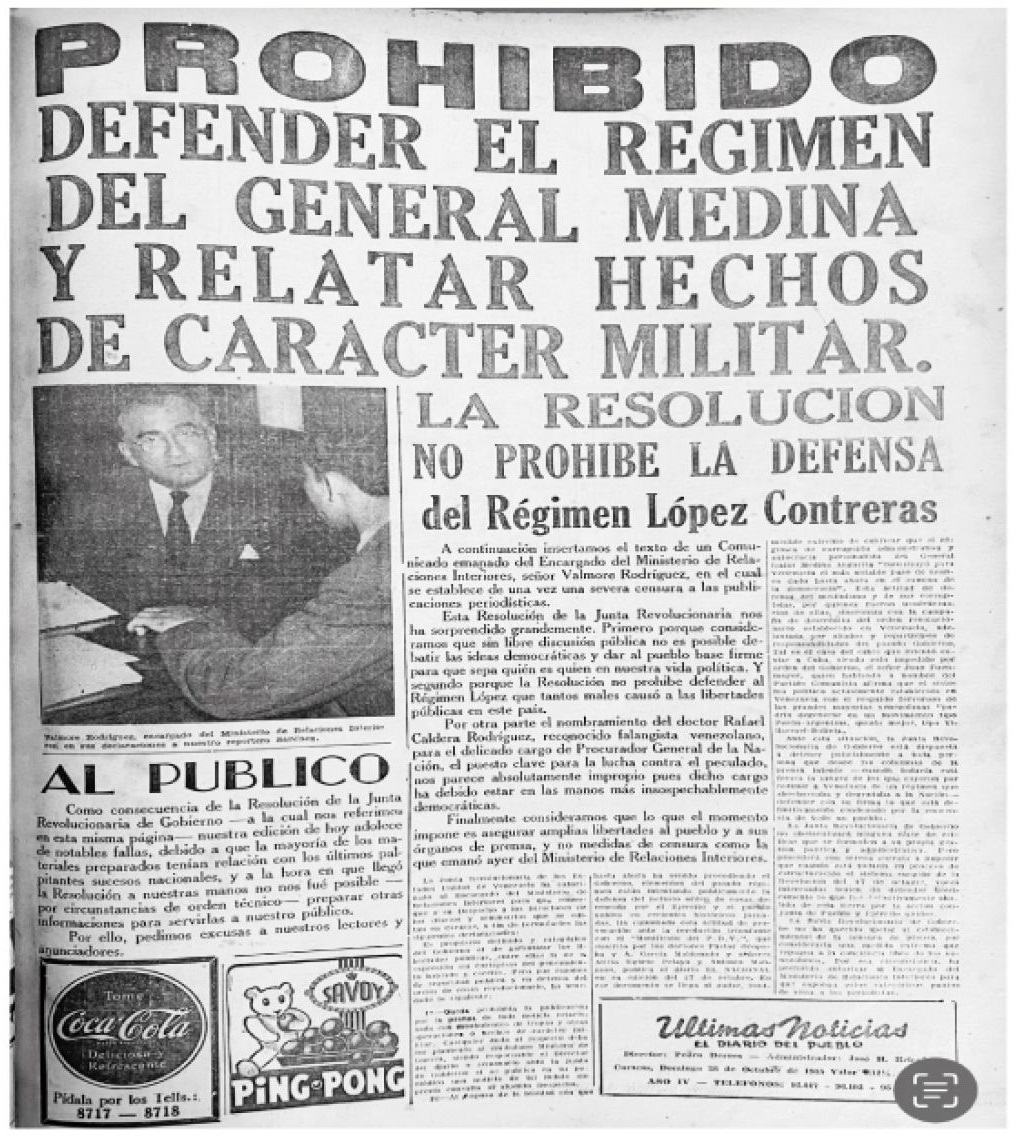
Headline of the newspaper Últimas Noticias stating that in Venezuela it will be possible to defend the government of Eleazar López Contreras, but not that of his successor Isaías Medina Angarita

The Jury of Civil and Administrative Responsibility was a set of ad hoc trials established by the Revolutionary Government Junta of Venezuela on November 27, 1945, during the period known as the Adeco Triennium, charged with establishing responsibilities for alleged embezzlement by Gómez-era, López-era, Medina-era officials, and associates from previous administrations. The Jury examined a total of 108 files and issued judgments restoring assets to the national patrimony totaling Bs. 124,000,000.

Eleazar López Contreras was convicted by the Jury of Civil and Administrative Responsibility.

Rufino Blanco Fombona of the National Academy of History wrote on the matter: "As far as we know, not a single bolívar was lost in his pockets. He also had the elegance to disdain embezzlement." Juan Serafín Penzini Hernández, Individual Number of the Academy of Political and Social Sciences and former Minister of Interior of Isaías Medina Angarita, wrote: "They went to the unheard-of extreme of judging and convicting Generals López Contreras and Medina Angarita for the crime of embezzlement before a Jury of Civil and Administrative Responsibility, an ad-hoc tribunal where the right to defense was annulled, the weight of evidence was altered, and the trial and sentencing process was modified to the manifest detriment of those judged by this ex-post-facto law, issued by Democratic Action."

== Ideology ==
=== Positivism ===
The government of Eleazar López Contreras, like the Gómez dictatorship, was influenced by positivism.

=== Cult of personality of Simón Bolívar ===
The government of López Contreras promoted the cult of personality of Simón Bolívar as a means of unifying the country and an alternative to Marxism, considered a "foreignizing ideology." It also promoted the creation of the Bolivarian Civic Grouping.

== Opposition ==
=== Outlawing of political parties ===
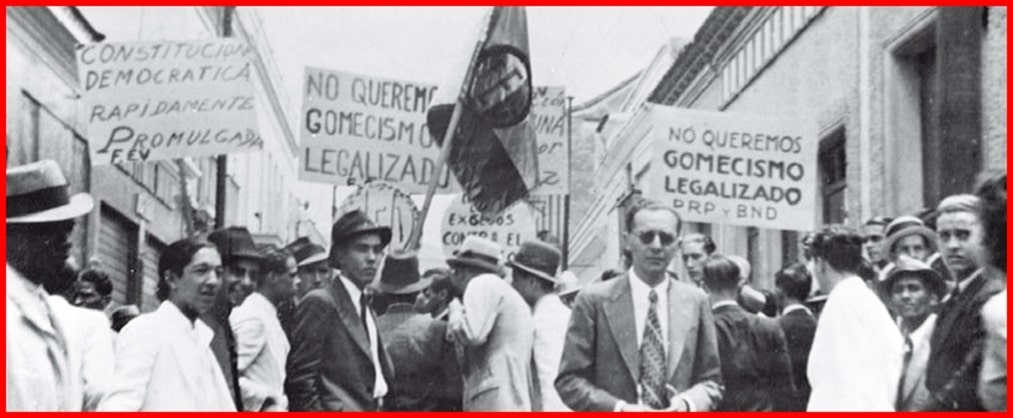
PRP supporters protesting in 1936. The party was outlawed the following year

In 1936, a new constitution was approved that maintained the prohibition of communism and anarchism, as well as the impossibility of women's participation in political life.

Under the protection of the Lara Law, the dissolution of parties and organizations such as the Organization of Venezuelans (ORVE), the Progressive Republican Party (PRP), the Venezuelan Student Federation (FEV), the Workers' Front (FO), and the National Labor Front (FNT) was ordered.

=== Exiles ===
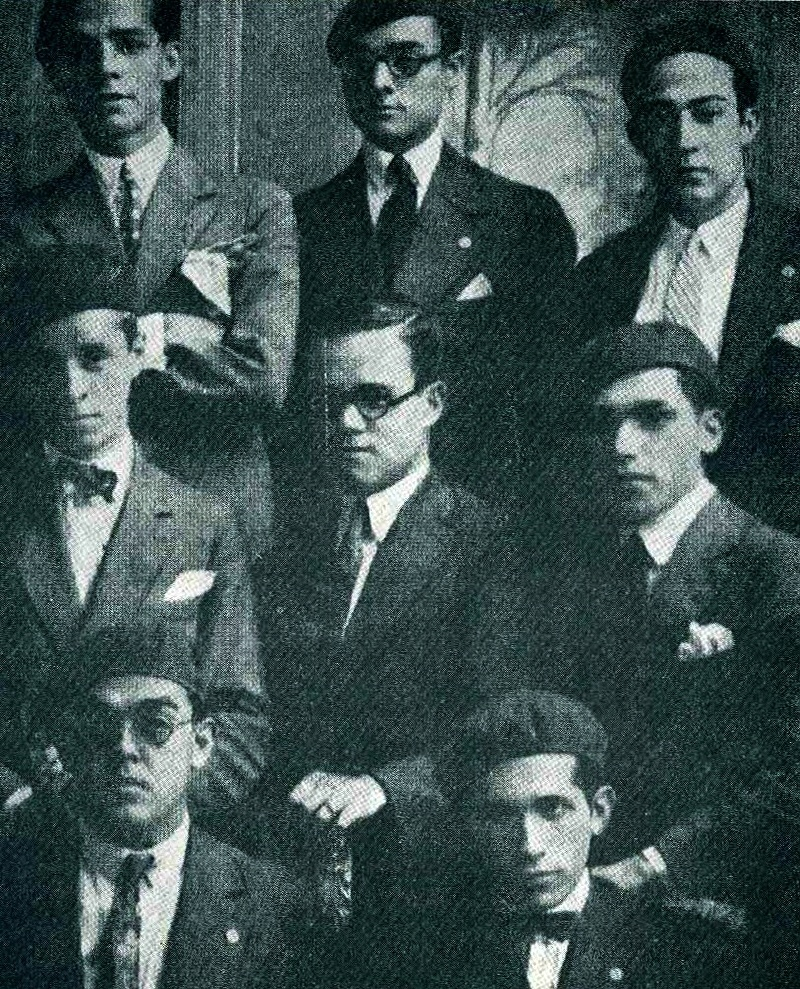
Jóvito Villalba (center-left) and Rómulo Betancourt (center), formerly part of the Generation of 1928, were exiled in 1937

On March 13, 1937, the government decreed the expulsion of 48 political leaders, who were the main opposition leaders, accused of being communists. Among those expelled were Miguel Acosta Saignes, Juan Bautista Fuenmayor, Rodolfo Quintero, Gonzalo Barrios, Carlos D'Ascoli, Carlos Augusto León, José Mayobre, Jóvito Villalba, Luis Troconis, Raúl Leoni, Gustavo Machado, Augusto Malavé Villalba, Hernani Portocarrero, among others. They were expelled on the ship Flandre to Panama and Mexico.

== See also ==
- Dictatorship of Juan Vicente Gómez
- Presidency of Isaías Medina Angarita
