= Venezuela during World War I =

Role of Venezuela in World War I

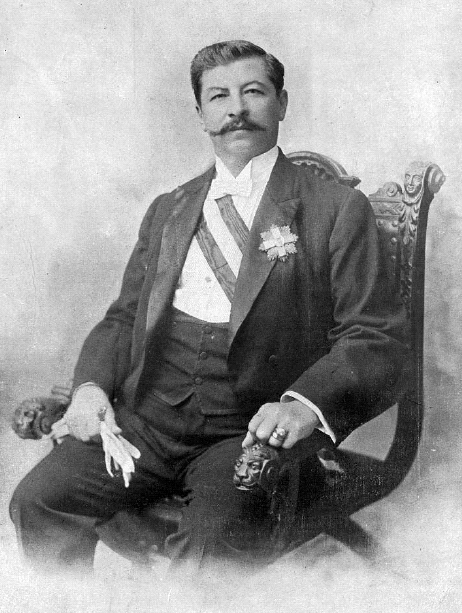
Juan Vicente Gómez, dictator of Venezuela during World War I. Gómez maintained a position of neutrality during the conflict.

Venezuela during World War I maintained a position of neutrality in the four years of the conflict during the dictatorship of Juan Vicente Gómez. For its position, his government was pressured and threatened by the conflict belligerants, and Gómez was accused of having pro-German sympathies. Gómez used the position of Victorino Márquez Bustillos as provisional president, in practice a "prime minister", to refuse to discuss changing his stance.

Despite the neutrality of gomecismo during the conflict, there were Venezuelans that fought in World War I. While the majority of them served in the French Foreign Legion, there were exceptions that enlisted in the Ottoman or German armies. Several of them were condecorated for their service.

After the surrender of the German Empire, the Caracas population celebrated in the streets the end of war on 15 November 1918. University students, journalists and writers participated in the demonstrations, which passed in front of the headquarters of the legations of France, United Kingdom, Belgium, Italy and the United States and headed to Bolívar Square. Although the prefect of Caracas assured Vicente Gómez that the demonstrators consisted only of "boys, men of the people, drivers", among others, the demonstration was dissolved by the police and its leaders were arrested by order of Juan Vicente Gómez. The same month the student and dissident Gustavo Machado leads a demonstration in favor of Belgium that sought to condemn the pro-German attitude assumed by Juan Vicente Gómez.

== Position ==
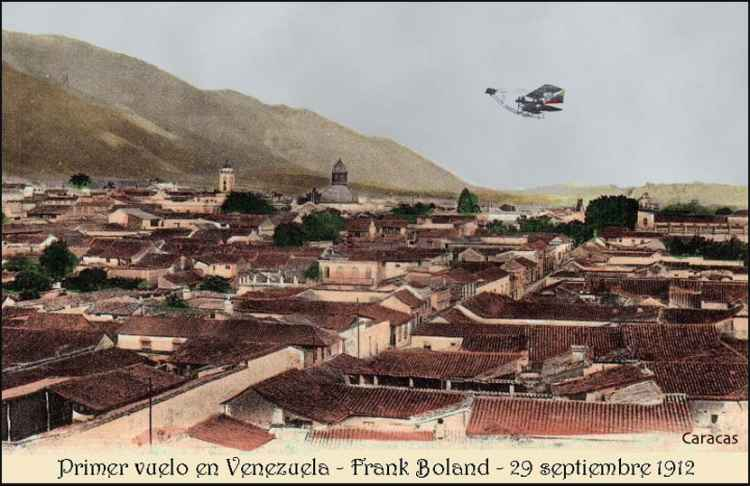
Colorized image of Caracas in 1912.

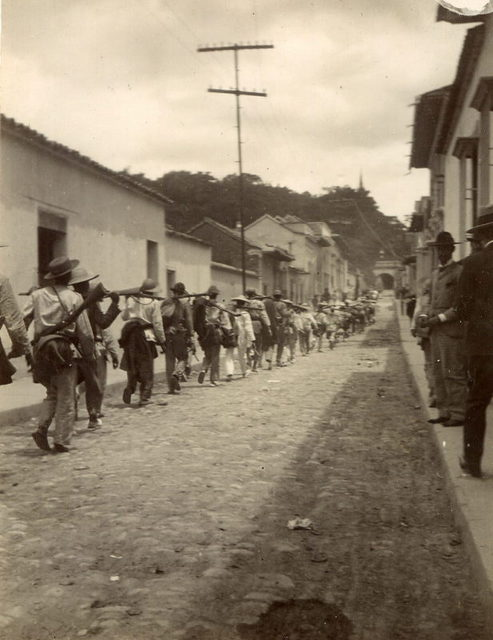
Soldiers of the Venezuelan Army during the Liberating Revolution, early 1s.

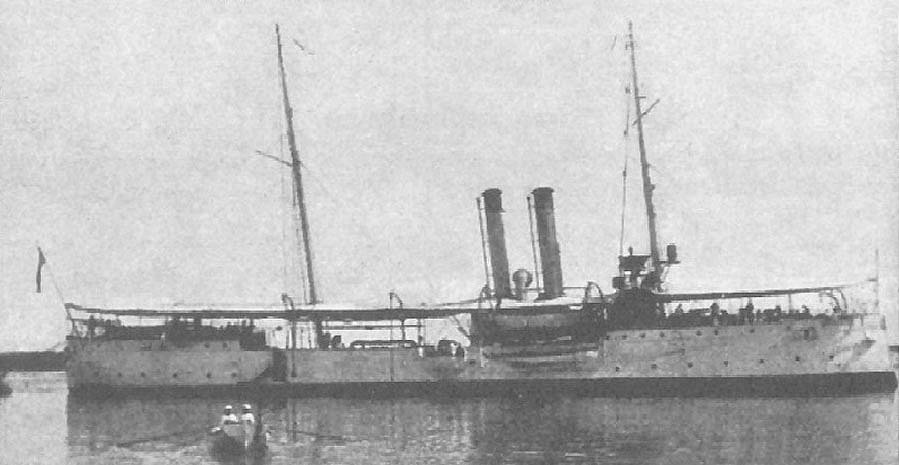
Cruiser Mariscal Sucre of the Venezuelan Navy.

Juan Vicente Gómez maintained a position of neutrality during World War I and the four years of the conflict; his government received pressures and threats from the belligerents of the conflict, and Gómez was accused of having pro-German sympathies. Gómez used as justification the presence of the provisional president, Victorino Márquez Bustillos, who in practice was a "prime minister", to refuse to discuss proposals to break neutrality, alleging that the matter corresponded to the provisional president, since he was the elected president, not sworn in.

The United States diplomatic representative to Venezuela, Preston McGoodwin, protested the ongoing conflict presented to him in addressing the situation due to the existence of a provisional president and an elected president with equal powers to handle U.S. demands.

== History ==
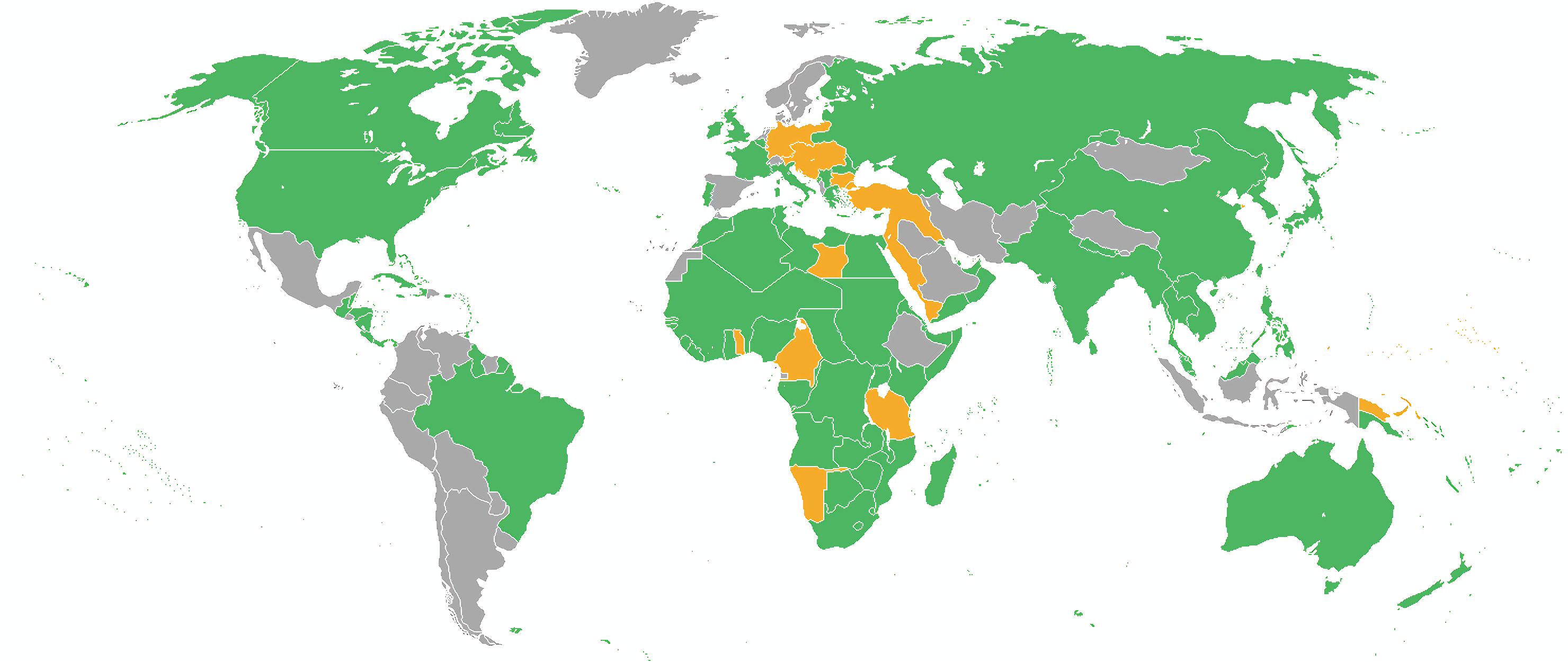
Participants in World War I. Those who fought alongside the Allies are in green, the Central Powers in orange, and neutral countries, such as Venezuela, in gray.

At the start of World War I in August 1914, the Gómez government proposed calling a World Congress of Neutrals through the Foreign Ministry, but the initiative was unsuccessful. The outbreak of the war precipitated the definitive settlement of the French–Venezuelan Protocol, signed in 1913, and payments for claims made by France. Through a transaction of Bs. 3,000,000, Venezuela was freed from all obligations arising from or that could originate from the claims. By 1915, the paper shortage caused by the war led to the interruption of the publication of El Cojo Ilustrado.

From late 1916, pressures and threats from the United States Department of State for Venezuela to declare belligerency on the side of the Allied powers made the situation very difficult for the Gómez government. In 1917, displeased with Gomecista neutrality during the war, U.S. government representatives approached Cipriano Castro (former president exiled in Santurce, Puerto Rico, after Gómez staged a coup against him) with the intention of attracting him for a possible reaction against the Venezuelan government, but Castro rejected the offer.

On February 5, 1917, César Zumeta, Venezuelan diplomat accredited in the United States, urged Juan Vicente Gómez to maintain Venezuela's neutrality stance, writing to him:

From the news published here, it seems that Brazil and other strong republics of South America are preparing to follow this country's example and break with Germany. If we consider that our only strength lies in our perfect neutrality, and that by abandoning it we compromise national interests of primary importance and our freedom of action in the future, I believe, General, that Venezuela should only reaffirm its neutral character and, at most, protest against the damages to our foreign trade caused by the obstacles to free navigation imposed by the great belligerents.

After the surrender of the German Empire, the Caracas population celebrated in the streets on November 15, 1918; university students, journalists, and writers participated in the demonstrations, which passed in front of the legations of France, the United Kingdom, Belgium, Italy, and the United States and headed to Bolívar Square. Although the Caracas prefect assured Vicente Gómez that the demonstration consisted only of "boys, men of the people, drivers," among others, the demonstration was dissolved by the police, and its leaders were arrested on Gómez's orders. The same month, the student and dissident Gustavo Machado led a demonstration in favor of Belgium that sought to condemn the pro-German attitude assumed by Juan Vicente Gómez.

The war weakened the country's Chambers of Commerce. In 1921, they ceased to be solely employer organizations of the mercantile sector and incorporated representatives from other productive sectors, and the same year the first Congress of Farmers, Ranchers, and Industrialists of Venezuela was held in Caracas.

== Soldiers ==
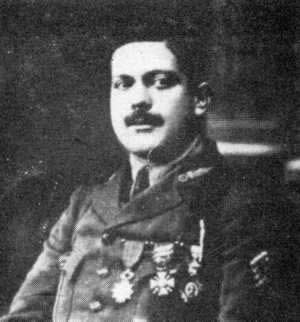
José de Jesús Sánchez Carrero, Venezuelan promoted to captain in the French Foreign Legion, the highest military hierarchical distinction for a foreigner.

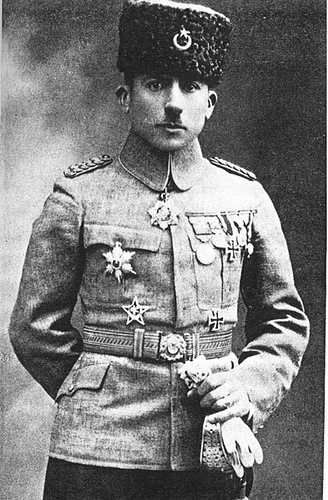
Rafael de Nogales Méndez, Venezuelan who served in the Ottoman army, decorated with the Iron Cross.

Despite the neutrality of the Gomecista regime during the conflict, several Venezuelans participated in World War I. While the majority of Venezuelans who fought in the war served in the French Foreign Legion, there were exceptions such as Rafael de Nogales Méndez in the Ottoman army and Carlos Meyer Baldó in the imperial German army. Several of them were decorated for their service.

The military man José de Jesús Sánchez Carrero, who had traveled to Switzerland for health reasons, decided to enlist in the French Foreign Legion, where he entered with the rank of lieutenant. Sánchez Carrero was then assigned to the Second Foreign Army and subsequently, for war merits, was promoted to captain on December 26, 1917, the highest military hierarchical distinction for a foreigner in the Legion. He was in the entire Verdun-Somme front campaign and its battles. In March 1918, he returned to Venezuela on leave, where he was received as a hero by the authorities and the population, and two months later returned to Europe to lead the second battalion of the French Foreign Legion. Carrero was mortally wounded in the Battle of the Argonne while commanding the third battalion of the First Regiment of the French Foreign Legion, and his remains were buried in the national cemetery of Ambleny, in France.

The poet Ismael Urdaneta enlisted in the French Foreign Legion when the war broke out, after having traveled to France, and served five years as a legionnaire. During his service, he was wounded on two occasions and was awarded the Inter-Allied Medal in recognition of his heroism. The doctor Enrique Tejera also enlisted in the French Foreign Legion in 1917 and served in the medical service. The writer, journalist, historian, and Venezuelan military man Lino Iribarren Celis participated in the American Expeditionary Forces sent to Europe between 1917 and 1918, receiving the World War I Victory Medal (1914–1918) for his service.

Reynaldo Hahn, composer and music critic based in France, was mobilized in June 1914 and spent the entire conflict on the battle front. Reflecting on the musical problems of the era, he decided to remain faithful to the tendencies of his mentor Jules Massenet and the French romantic movement.

In 1914, Angel Santos Palazzi, along with other Guayanese sons of Corsican Frenchmen, had to leave to fight for France, serving as a corporal in the 273rd Infantry Regiment of the French army. Palazzi lost his life in the line of fire under heavy artillery combat. He was 37 years old when he received an artillery projectile to the head during the Battle of the Somme on July 24, 1916, and was buried in the Amiens Cemetery.

After having to flee the country, the adventurer and military man Rafael de Nogales Méndez unsuccessfully offered his services to the Allied Powers, first in Belgium and then in France. De Nogales later traveled to Persia as an officer of the Turkish Expeditionary Forces, participating in the massacre committed by Turkish troops against the Armenian population in the city of Van, for which he received the title of "Bey". In 1915, he traveled to Istanbul and fought as an officer in the regular Ottoman army. De Nogales obtained the Iron Cross from the hands of Kaiser Wilhelm II, the Star of Mechedieh, and received the rank of lieutenant colonel of the General Staff of the third division of the imperial Ottoman cavalry, ad honorem; he also served as military governor of part of the coast of Palestine. In 1917, he led an expedition that crossed the Egyptian border and burned several villages. In 1919, he left Turkish army service and traveled to the United States. Carlos Meyer Baldó, after settling in Hamburg, participated in the war as a member of the German army and aviation under Baron von Richthofen. On June 28, 1918, in the area known as Corcy, he shot down the SPAD S.XIII of the French ace René Montrion (11 victories) of the French Air Service. Meyer made Jasta 4 his most successful squadron: his third shoot-down occurred on July 15 against a French SPAD S.XIII. Enrique Tejera enlisted as a volunteer in the Medical Corps of the French Army. He finally obtained the title of Colonial Doctor in 1917 and took Bacteriology courses at the Pasteur Institute.

== See also ==
- Venezuela during World War II

== Bibliography ==
- Pérez Jurado, Carlos (1999). Muerto por Francia (in Spanish). Caracas: Talleres de Italgráfica. OCLC 951606690.
