= La Sagrada (Venezuela) =

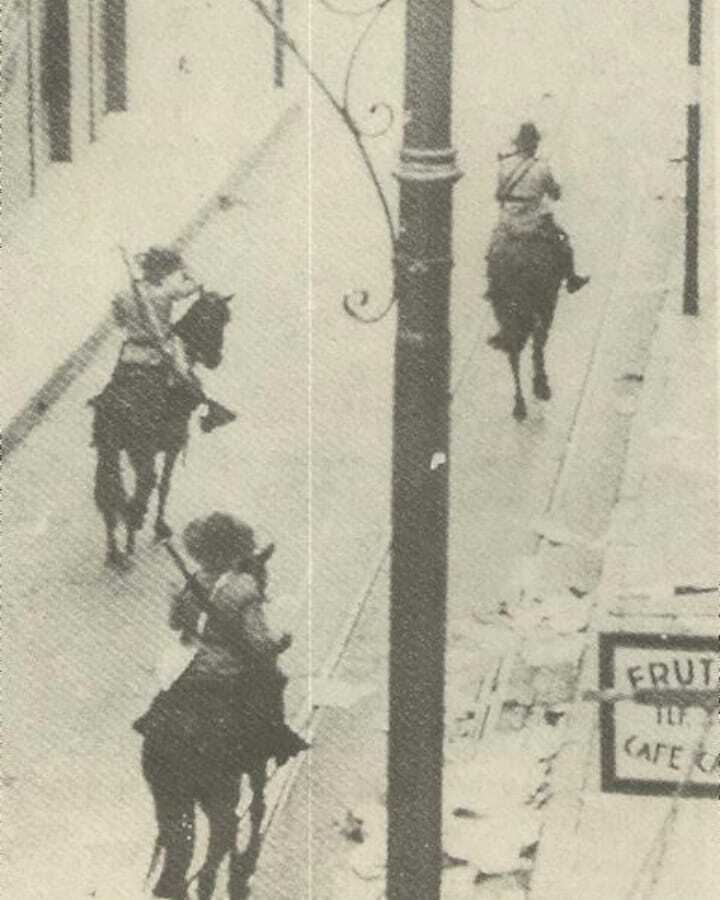
La Sagrada.

La Sagrada was the informal name of the security and intelligence service of Venezuela during the dictatorship of Juan Vicente Gómez (1908–1935). It functioned as a political police, carrying out repression against government dissidents, with hundreds of disappearances and murders.

== History ==
According to El Desafío de la Historia, its initial members all came from Capacho, in Táchira, from where Cipriano Castro had recruited members for his personal guard. According to El Impulso, the nickname came from the phrase "don't mess with them, they're sacred", which evolved into La Sagrada. Its members dressed in liqui liqui and typically carried Mauser rifles, .38 caliber revolvers, and machetes.

After the assassination of Juan Crisóstomo Gómez in 1923, a group of people were accused of the crime and imprisoned in La Rotunda prison. La Sagrada took them out of prison to drug and torture them. They were later found murdered by gunfire. A week after the assassination, a member of La Sagrada climbed over the window grate of a musician's residence in Caracas who was playing the piano, with the intention of inspecting someone who was considered to be disturbing the presidential family's mourning; upon seeing La Sagrada enter his house, the pianist suffered a heart attack.

La Sagrada arrested Joaquín Mariño for disseminating communist propaganda. His supposed suicide was reported, and an order was issued to not open his coffin, which his family disobeyed, finding signs of torture. The Bishop of Valencia, Salvador Montes de Oca, had a confrontation with the Gómez regime due to his organization of Mariño's mass, in a context where the Church prohibited the burial of suicides.
