= Laureano Vallenilla Lanz =

Venezuelan intellectual and sociologist (1870–1936)

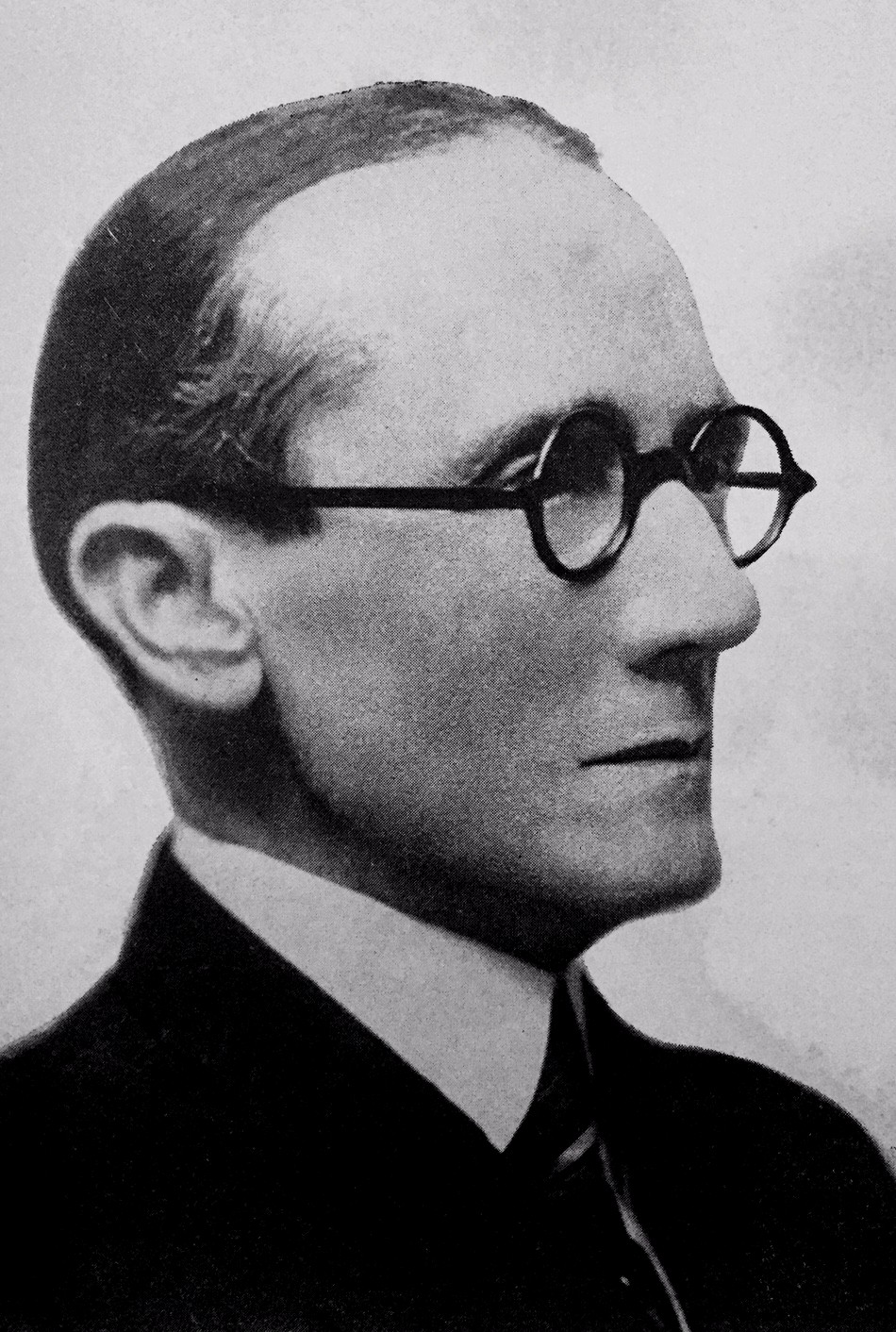
- Born: November 10, 1870; Barcelona, Anzoátegui State, Venezuela
- Died: November 16, 1936 (aged 66); Paris, France

Signature
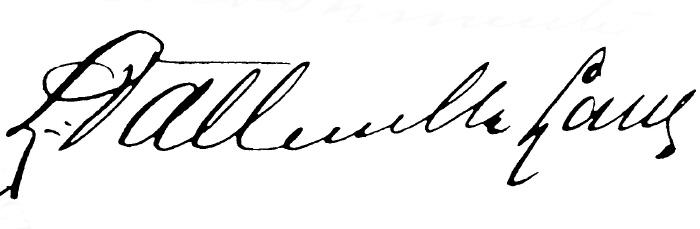

Laureano Vallenilla Lanz (November 10, 1870 – November 16, 1936) was a Venezuelan intellectual and sociologist who occupied the presidency of the congress for 20 years during the Gomez regime.

== Political career ==
Vallenilla Lanz held a number of positions under the dictatorship of Juan Vicente Gómez and was well known as an apologist for his regime. In his best-known work, Cesarismo Democrático (1919; English title: Democratic Caesarism), he justified the caudillo system by stating that due to the character of the Venezuelan people, rule by a dictator was necessary to maintain public order. In his view, this system was democratic in the sense that it was due to the "unconscious suggestion of the majority".

He was for a time the Envoy Extraordinary and Minister Plenipotentiary of Venezuela to France during the 1930s.

== Ideology ==
Vallenilla was "largely responsible for developing a body of historical and sociological theory dealing with issues of race, power relations, and social development". He viewed "the popular masses as a backward and unruly social group" and argued that political leadership needed to be "exercised through the mediation of a popular strongman who would channel the energies of the masses during the transition to a democratic order".

=== Democratic Caesarism ===
Specifically, Vallenilla argued that race had no biological basis and ought to be understood as socially constructed, particularly through political projects of nation-making. Vallenilla assailed the notion that racial purity provides moral or political legitimacy.

== Death ==
Vallenilla's funeral was held on November 18, 1936, at the Église Saint-Pierre-de-Chaillot in Paris. The remembrance was led by his son Laureano Vallenilla and other members of the family.

== See also ==
- José Gil Fortoul
- Venezuelan literature
- List of Venezuelan writers
