= Rafael de Nogales =

Venezuelan soldier, writer and adventurer (1877–1937)

- Rafaek Inchauspe Mendéz
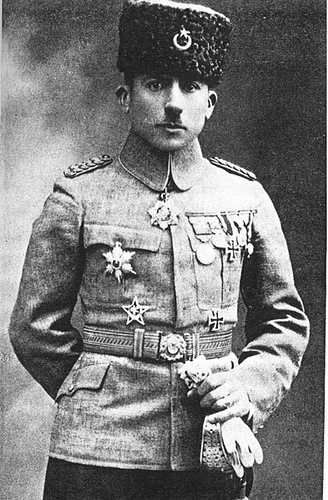
- Rafael de Nogales Mendéz in an Ottoman military uniform of WWI
- Born: October 14, 1877; San Cristóbal, Táchira, Venezuela
- Died: July 10, 1937 (aged 59); Panamá, Panamá, Panama
- Military career
- Allegiance: Spanish Empire; Venezuela; Japanese Empire; Russian Empire; Mexico; Venezuela; German Empire; Nicaragua
- Rank: General
- Commands: Governor of Sinai Peninsula, Ramla, Lod and Latrun
- Conflicts: Spanish–American War; Russo-Japanese War; Mexican Revolution; World War I; Caucasus Campaign; Siege of Van; Sinai and Palestine Campaign
- Awards: Iron Cross; Gallipoli Star; Order of Osmanieh

Rafael Ramón Intxauspe Méndez, or Pedro Rafael Inchauspe Méndez, known internationally as Rafael de Nogales Méndez (October 14, 1877 – July 10, 1936 or 1937 (Note: Sources differ on the exact year of his death. While a large portion of historiography cites 1936, the biographical prologue written by Ana Mercedes Pérez for his memoirs explicitly states, providing press details, that he died in July 1937.)) was a Venezuelan soldier, spy, writer, and adventurer. He rejected the term adventurer, preferring to describe himself as a "knight-errant" driven by the motto "act or die." During World War I, he served as a general in the army of the Ottoman Empire and was a key Western witness to the events surrounding the Armenian genocide.

== Early life and origins ==
Born in San Cristóbal, Táchira State, on October 14, 1877, he was baptized in the same town at the San Sebastián Parish Church on March 19, 1878, with family roots in the Táchira town of Seboruco. Rafael de Nogales was the only son of Pedro Felipe Inchauspe (or Intxauspe), a native of Nutrias, owner of copper mines in Seboruco, coffee plantations in El Abejal, and a major shareholder of the Great Táchira Railway. His mother, Josefa Méndez Brito, was originally from Barinas.

His family had a notable lineage. On his maternal side, he was a descendant of the Spanish conquistador Diego de Méndez, an esquire who accompanied Christopher Columbus on his fourth voyage. His great-grandmother was Magdalena Díaz de Méndez, a Barinas matron who donated horses to Simón Bolívar's army for the independence campaign, and he was related to the archbishop and revolutionary hero Ramón Ignacio Méndez [es]. On the paternal side, he was the great-grandson of Colonel Pedro Luis Intxauspe, who joined the patriot cause in 1821.

Rafael would later adopt the Spanish translation of his Basque surname "Intxauspe", becoming "de Nogales". He had three sisters: Magdalena, Pepita (married to the German Paul Gestaker), and Ana María, who became the Countess of Westerholt upon marrying Count Max Von Westerholt und Gysenberg on September 6, 1920.

His father hired the best Venezuelan and Colombian pedagogues to privately tutor his son, who also studied at the German school of Táchira, run by Teodoro Messerschmidt. Following the tradition of wealthy Andean families, he left Venezuela around 1883, at the age of seven, to study at various Prussian and Belgian military academies. De Nogales was educated in Germany, Belgium, and Spain, studying philosophy, literature, and sciences at the universities of Barcelona, Brussels, and Leuven. He developed extraordinary linguistic skills, mastering German, French, Italian, Russian, Japanese, Chinese, and Korean.

== Military career and adventures ==
He was involved in numerous military conflicts from the end of the 19th century. At the age of seventeen, he enlisted as an ensign in the Spanish Navy, and in 1898, he participated in the Spanish–American War in Cuba, defending the Spanish cause against the United States. Following the defeat, he managed to flee to Mexico, worked as a cowboy in Arizona, and hunted bears in Nevada (where he occasionally used the pseudonyms "Chico Méndez" and "Nevada Méndez"). He later traveled to North Africa and Pakistan.

In 1901, he returned to Venezuela, getting into a heated argument at the Miraflores Palace with President Cipriano Castro over his despotic governance. Upon the outbreak of the Liberating Revolution in 1902, Castro ordered his arrest while Nogales was attending a dance at the Macuto casino. He managed to escape in a boat while still wearing his tuxedo. He traveled through several Central American countries before reaching Nicaragua, where President José Santos Zelaya received him and provided everything needed for a military expedition to invade Venezuela. On the schooner Libertad, De Nogales attacked Venezuela through Carazúa, a village in the Venezuelan Guajira, fighting against General Antonio Dávila, but was defeated. Wounded in a leg and a shoulder, and suffering from malaria, he retreated and boarded the schooner in the same location.

He arrived in Mexico, where he enjoyed the protection of dictator Porfirio Díaz and distinguished himself by combating arms smuggling with his police force. In 1903, he moved to San Francisco, where he sold his horse and weapons to embark for Shanghai. There, he operated as a spy for the Chinese until he was discovered and forced to flee. He then participated in the Russo-Japanese War acting as a double agent, getting Russian sailors and merchants drunk in Vladivostok to steal information and creating a comprehensive network of maps and topographic charts for Japanese operations.

After losing interest in the Asian conflict in 1904, he crossed to Alaska, where he lived with Inuit, hunting whales and worked as a miner and gold prospector. In 1905, he traveled to California and then returned to Alaska, where he bought a foal and exploring equipment with his small savings. He returned to California with an amount of gold, but went bankrupt again. During this period, he met Ricardo Flores Magón, a Mexican revolutionary who suggested he enlist in his ranks. He was also allegedly involved as an arms smuggler for Pancho Villa around this time.

He tried again to organize the overthrow of Castro and, later, of Juan Vicente Gómez. In 1911, he crossed the Ureña border, presumably supported by the governor of Táchira State, Régulo Olivares, who ultimately failed to deliver the promised rifles. After being pursued, he managed to flee via the Táchira River. After rejecting a government position—which made him an enemy of the regime—he took up arms and successfully became the governor of Apure for almost forty-five days. When his uprising definitively failed and a price was placed on his head, he went into exile on the island of Curaçao.

== World War I ==
At the outbreak of World War I in 1914, Nogales was on the island of Trinidad. Upon learning that Venezuela was maintaining its neutrality, he decided to travel to Europe to seek action. Disembarking in Calais, he tried to enlist in the French army, which only offered him a position in the French Foreign Legion and demanded he renounce his Venezuelan nationality. After refusing, he offered his services to Belgium and the Kingdom of Montenegro, which he saw as oppressed and heroic nations, but was systematically rejected for not being a citizen of an Allied country. After six months of searching, he visited the Turkish embassy in Sofia (Bulgaria), where, thanks to his ties with Prussian officers, he was accepted as an officer in the Ottoman army, an ally of Germany. He decided to do this due to his sympathy for Germany and not due to any sympathy for the Ottoman Empire. As such, he served in the Ottoman Army, but under German command. There, he gradually developed an anti-Turkish and pro-Armenian sentiment due to him witnessing the Armenian genocide.

He arrived in Constantinople, and in January 1915, began his service in the Ottoman Third Army in Erzurum (Anatolia). Marshal Otto Liman von Sanders, head of the German mission in Turkey, and General Fritz Bronsart von Schellendorf, chief of the Ottoman General Staff, granted him an officer rank without requiring him to renounce his nationality, dispatching him to the Russian front in the Caucasus. Nogales's performance was so distinguished that he soon reached the rank of brigadier general, commanding twelve thousand soldiers who baptized him "Nogales Bey." In this role, he managed to halt the advance of Russian troops on the empire's northern border and British troops on the southern border.

His tactical expertise earned him the Iron Cross First Class from Kaiser Wilhelm II of Germany, as well as the gold saber of the Order of Mejishovon and the Star of Mechedieh. However, during his deployment on the eastern front in the spring of 1915, he was the only Christian officer to be a direct witness to the siege of Van and the subsequent massacre of the local Armenian population. Initially, Nogales had been critical of Armenian nationalism, considering that the demand for independence was unjustified given that Armenians represented barely 30% of the population in those provinces, advocating instead for autonomy. However, upon witnessing the brutality of the Armenian genocide, his perception changed radically, and he felt profound disappointment seeing that the massacres occurred with the complacency of the regular command, led by Khalil Bey.

In his writings, Nogales described the massacres and reported that civil authorities preferred to perpetrate the murders at night with the help of Kurdish militias. Regarding Van, he recounted that the attackers of the Armenian quarter were not insurgents, but the civil authorities themselves supported by mobs. When he tried to stop the assault, the local mayor replied that he was merely fulfilling an unequivocal order from the governor-general to exterminate all Armenian males aged twelve and older. During his visit to Aghtamar in Lake Van, where the Armenian Cathedral of the Holy Cross is located, he discovered the corpses of numerous murdered priests.

On June 26, 1915, he visited Diyarbakır and conversed with its governor, Mehmet Reşid, known historically as the "butcher of Diyarbakir." There he witnessed new massacres against the provincial Christian population. According to Nogales's account, Reşid told him that he had received a telegram directly from the Interior Minister, Talaat Pasha, with the explicit order to "Burn-Destroy-Kill."

He soon understood the gravity of his perilous situation, witnessing scenes that "no Christian should be a witness to." Nogales requested his discharge from the army, claiming that he had been secretly sentenced to die by poisoning by the Turkish command for "knowing too much." This claim is contested by historians such as Mehmet Necati Kutlu, who points to a document from General Mahmud Kâmil dated October 1915 indicating that Nogales posed no danger to the Empire even if he disclosed information after his discharge.

Prior to his departure, he served on the Mesopotamian front and the Kut-al-Amara front in 1916. He later joined the Ottoman Fourth Army on the Palestine and Gaza front in 1917, where his contingent defeated the British. He was appointed military governor of Sinai in Egypt, an occupied province that he partially managed to retake—dynamiting the wells of Bir-Biren and taking the Egyptian gate—before being ordered to return to Constantinople. After the defeat of the Ottoman Empire in October 1918, the Allied headquarters granted him a passport and an official safe-conduct that allowed him to leave Constantinople unharmed. This was largely because many British officers admired him for having saved the lives of prisoners of war from torture and executions. Nevertheless, his military actions on the Turkish side led U.S. President Woodrow Wilson to publicly label him the "executioner of Armenia" and ban his entry into the United States.

== Literary exile in London ==
During the final years of the Gómez regime in Venezuela, de Nogales settled in London, England. He became a regular figure at the Spanish club in Cavendish Square, where he would arrive in an impeccable tuxedo and monocle. In this intellectual environment, he attended gatherings with prominent intellectuals from Ibero-America, such as Fernando de los Ríos, Ramón Pérez de Ayala, Américo Castro, and the poets Manuel Altolaguirre and Concha Méndez. The British writer Robert Cunninghame Graham and historian Lowell Thomas were profound admirers of his career and wrote prologues to his books.

As an author, his publications generated significant international repercussion. In 1924, he published Cuatro años bajo la Media Luna in Spanish, preceding Lawrence of Arabia's famous work Seven Pillars of Wisdom by two years. The work was later translated into several languages. The Turkish translator of the book, Ismael Hakki, was highly critical of Nogales, accusing him of being "a foreign officer without lineage who bit the hand that lent him the sword." Paradoxically, the testimony narrated in his memoirs has been instrumentalized over time by both sides of the conflict: by Armenians to document the systematic massacres they suffered, and by Turks to argue that the military action was a response to an armed rebellion in which Armenian militias also massacred Muslim civilians.

In London, the publication of his book The Looting of Nicaragua (where he denounced the interventions of the US Marines after traveling to Central America as a correspondent and interviewing Augusto César Sandino) caused such a stir that the book was seized by the United States government and provoked a multi-million dollar censorship lawsuit in North America.

Despite his international prestige, the diplomatic corps of dictator Juan Vicente Gómez in Europe—led by Ambassador Diógenes Escalante—received official instructions to socially isolate him, branding him in confidential memos as a "communist and dangerous terrorist" involved in secret dealings with Bolsheviks. However, diplomats such as Consul José Eugenio Pérez dismissed these accusations and advocated for him directly to Gómez, arguing that de Nogales was a globally respected hero and not an armed agitator.

== Later years and death ==
Following the death of Juan Vicente Gómez, de Nogales returned to Venezuela in 1936 at the age of 58, during the new government of Eleazar López Contreras, hoping to put his vast technical knowledge at the disposal of the Venezuelan army. However, the new government and military commanders viewed a figure of his international caliber with suspicion. Instead of offering him the position of Inspector General, as requested by young military officers (including Emilio López Méndez and José León Rangel) who visited him in Valencia, the government granted him a minor and poorly paid job: customs administrator in Las Piedras (Falcón).

De Nogales accepted the position due to his precarious financial situation, but the humidity of the site severely aggravated his arthritis, forcing him to frequent the thermal baths of Las Trincheras in Carabobo and reside intermittently in a German hotel in Valencia. Deeply offended and with failing health, he resigned from the post. In response, the authorities sent him abroad on a minor bureaucratic mission to "study" the gendarmerie of Panama.

Upon arriving in Central America, de Nogales showed signs of severe illness, suffering from inflammation in his hands and skin ailments. On July 7, he underwent throat surgery; surprisingly, three days later he woke up in a critical condition due to severe pneumonia complicated by bulbar paralysis. He died at the Hotel Panamá at 2:45 p.m. on July 10.

His end was marked by institutional abandonment. The expenses for his embalming and modest transfer were covered by a single check for 1,615 dollars he had in his belongings. His body was repatriated on the cargo steamer Urazio, arriving at the port of La Guaira on July 24. The Venezuelan government completely ignored the return of his mortal remains; the coffin remained abandoned and pushed into a corner of the customs basement surrounded by merchandise for several days, unclaimed by the Chancellery.

The neglect of his remains only ended when journalists from the newspapers El Heraldo and La Esfera discovered the crate in the customs office and publicly denounced the situation at the end of July, preventing his remains from ending up in a mass grave. Finally, Rafael de Nogales Méndez was buried on August 2 in the General Cemetery of the South in Caracas. The ceremony was held modestly, without military honors and in the absence of the President of the Republic.

The burial was attended by the Minister of Germany and various Venezuelan intellectuals who delivered speeches condemning the ostracism to which he was subjected. Similarly, the former German emperor Wilhelm II, from his exile in the Netherlands, sent an imposing wreath of gold oak and laurels with a parchment card that read: "To Rafael de Nogales Méndez, generalissimo in the Great War, one of the bravest and most noble knights I have ever known."

As the author of prolific literary works, De Nogales never inclined toward the emotional analysis of his actions and summarized stoically in his memoirs: "The inner world does not exist for the man of action."

== Published works ==
Rafael de Nogales Méndez captured his multiple experiences in various works, some originally written in English:

- Cuatro años bajo la Media Luna (1924, republished in English as Four Years Beneath the Crescent in 1926). A key work where he documents his experiences as an officer of the Ottoman Empire and details the atrocities committed against the Armenian population.
- El saqueo de Nicaragua (1928, translated into English as The Looting of Nicaragua).
- Memoirs of a Soldier of Fortune (1932).
- Silk Hat and Spurs (1934), originally written in English. It features a prologue by Field Marshal Edmund Allenby, who describes him in the work as "a brave enemy, and now a trusted friend."

== See also ==
- Venezuela during World War I
- T. E. Lawrence
- Armenian genocide survivors

== Bibliography ==
- Almarza, Pedro (1997). Nogales Bey. San Cristóbal: Diculta. ISBN 980-330-028-8.
- Englund, Peter (2011). La belleza y el dolor de la batalla: La Primera Guerra Mundial en 227 fragmentos. Roca. ISBN 978-84-9918-301-5.
- Jäckel de Aldana, Jasmina (January–April 2000). "¿Del aventurero trotamundos al héroe nacional venezolano?". Estudios de Asia y África. Colegio de México.
- Kutlu, Mehmet Necati (2015). "Un oficial latinoamericano en el ejército otomano y algunos documentos nuevos". 1915 el año más largo del Imperio otomano. Una mirada centenaria. Universidad Nacional de Costa Rica.
- McQuaid, Kim (2010). The Real and Assumed Personalities of Famous Men: Rafael De Nogales, T.E. Lawrence. and the Birth of the Modern Era, 1914–1937. London: Gomidas Institute. ISBN 978-1-903656-97-6.
- Nogales Méndez, Rafael de (2015). Cuatro años bajo la Media Luna. Caracas: Fundación Editorial Almuzara. ISBN 978-8416392100.
- Nogales Méndez, Rafael de (1926). Four Years Beneath The Crescent. London: Charles Scribner's Sons / Sterndale Classics (Gomidas Institute).
- Nogales Méndez, Rafael de (1932). Memoirs of a Soldier of Fortune. New York: Garden City Publishing Company, Inc.
- Nogales Méndez, Rafael de (1991). Memorias. Translated and prologued by Ana Mercedes Pérez. Caracas: Biblioteca Ayacucho. ISBN 980-276-162-1.
- Pérez, Ana Mercedes (2014). "Prólogo". Memorias. Linkgua Ediciones. ISBN 978-8490075036.
- Quero de Trinca, Mirela (August 2005). Rafael de Nogales Méndez. Biblioteca Biográfica Venezolana. Caracas: El Nacional.
- Rojo, Violeta (2002). "Memorias de un aventurero venezolano: Rafael de Nogales Méndez" (PDF). Revista Virtual Contexto (8).
