= Gonzalo Barrios =

Gonzalo Barrios can refer to:

- Gonzalo Barrios (politician) (1902–1993), Venezuelan politician
- Gonzalo Barrios (gamer) (born 1995), professional Super Smash Bros. player
