= José Gil Fortoul =

Venezuelan writer, historian and politician (1861–1943)

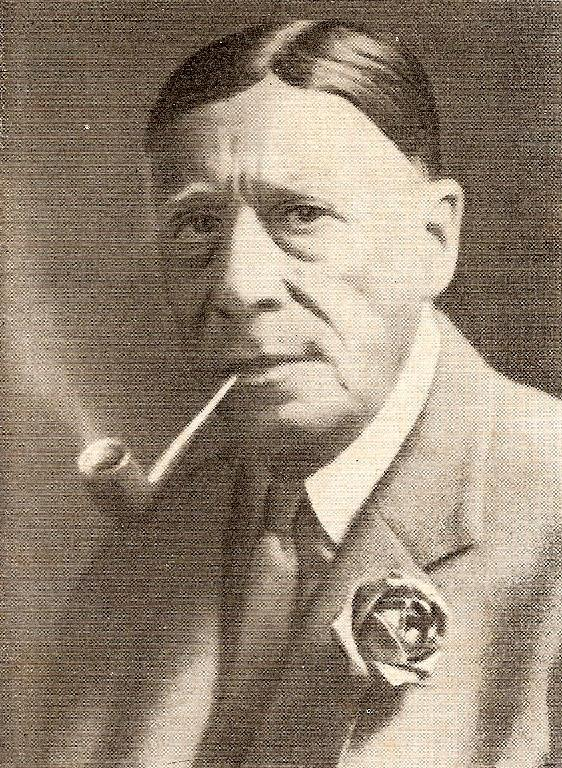

Acting President of Venezuela
- In office 5 August 1913 – 19 April 1914
- Preceded by: Juan Vicente Gómez
- Succeeded by: Victorino Márquez Bustillos

Personal details
- Born: 25 November 1861 Barquisimeto, Province of Barquisimeto, Venezuela
- Died: 15 June 1943 (aged 81) Caracas, Federal District, Venezuela
- Spouse: Luisa Marcadet
- Education: Central University of Venezuela
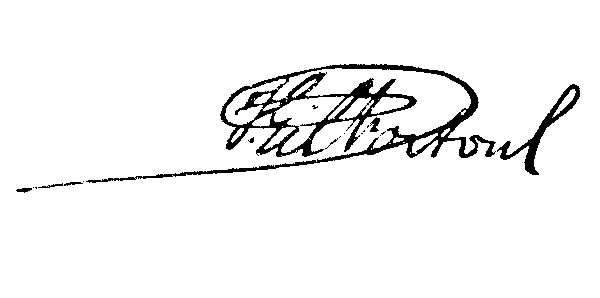
- Signature

José Gil Fortoul (25 November 1861, in Barquisimeto, Province of Barquisimeto, Venezuela – 15 June 1943, in Caracas, Federal District, Venezuela) was a Venezuelan writer, historian, and politician, who was briefly the acting president of Venezuela. As a political scientist and legal scholar, he is closely identified with the movement of Venezuelan positivism. He was an ally of the dictator Juan Vicente Gómez, supporting his regime both politically and in his social and historical writing. In 1913 Fortoul was appointed provisional President of Venezuela, serving for less than a year.

== Early life ==
Fortoul was born in Barquisimeto on 25 November 1861. He grew up and was educated in El Tocuyo, earning a Bachelor of Philosophy from the school La Concordia on 2 July 1880, under the supervision of Egidio Montesinos (es). He then moved to Caracas to study political science and law at the Central University of Venezuela, graduating with a doctorate in political science in 1885. While he was a student there, Fortoul collaborated with Adolf Ernst on the newspaper La Opinion, where he published columns that caused controversies with the ecclesiastic authorities. His early association with Ernst was part of why Fortoul was later considered to be a core member of the Venezuelan positivist movement.

== Career ==
In 1886, Fortoul was appointed the consul to France in Bordeaux. He worked as a diplomat in Europe until 1896, and during that time he served as a diplomat to several different countries, including in Liverpool and Frankfurt. While working in Europe he wrote a series of books, including works on constitutional law, the philosophy of the penal system, and reflections on life in Paris, as well as a novel and a book on fencing.

In 1897, Fortoul returned to Caracas. There he published in the Venezuelan papers El Cojo Ilustrado (es) and El Pregonero. In Venezuela he received a grant from the government to prepare a history of Venezuela, and in 1900 he once again became a diplomat, working in Trinidad, Mexico, Liverpool and Paris. In 1905 he became the Venezuelan charge d'affaires in Berlin, and finished work on a constitutional history of Venezuela; 3 years later he would publish a sequel.

Fortoul was a participant in the Hague Convention of 1907, and was the focus of a public controversy when he opposed a government order to withdraw from the conference in objection to a motion on the terms of international debts. In the 1908 coup of Juan Vicente Gómez, Fortoul returned to the government's favour.

From 1910 to 1911 and 1914 to 1916, Fortoul served as a senator in the National Assembly of Venezuela. In 1913 he was the President of the Government Council while Juan Vicente Gómez was engaged in a military conflict, which made him the acting president under the succession provisions in the Venezuelan constitution at the time.

== Impact ==
Fortoul has been classified as one of the canonical figures in Venezuelan positivism. This movement advanced modernism in Venezuela in the mid-19th century, and was simultaneously associated both with the development of institutions and the state as well as closeness with dictatorial regimes. Fortoul is remembered as a core exponent of the movement, both in terms of promoting modernism in Venezuela and in his close association with an authoritarian regime. He is closely associated with other allies of Juan Vincente Gómez, including César Zumeta (es), Pedro Manuel Arcaya (es), Laureano Vallenilla Lanz, Victorino Márquez Bustillos.

Fortoul's support for the dictator Juan Vicente Gómez has been credited with the political support that his works received, and led to them being more freely published and more widely available than other Venezuelan writers of his time, including other Venezuelan positivists.

In 1915, Fortoul was a founder of the Venezuelan Academy of Political Science (es).

== Selected works ==
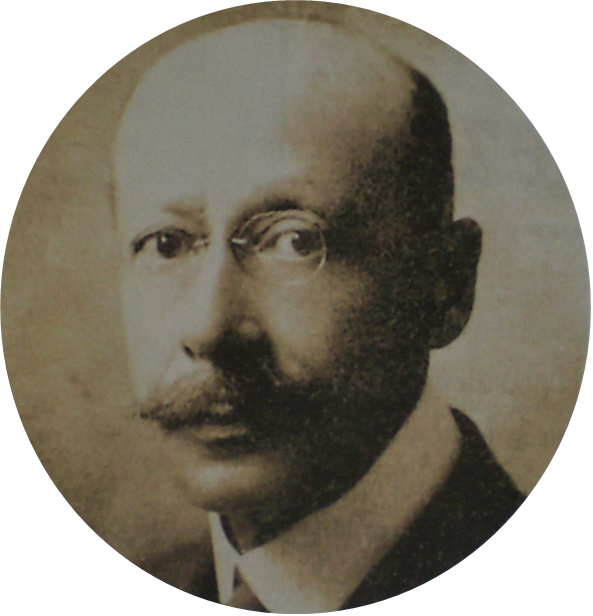
José Gil Fortoul in 1909

- 1879: Infancia de mi Musa (Barquisimeto, Venezuela)
- 1887: Recuerdos de París (Barcelona, Spain)
- 1888: Julián (Leipzig, Germany)
- 1890: Filosofía Constitucional (Paris, France)
- 1891: Filosofía Penal (Brussels, Belgium)
- 1891: El Humo de mi Pipa (Paris, France)
- 1892: La Esgrima Moderna (Liverpool, England)
- 1892: ¿Idilio? (Liverpool, England)
- 1895: Pasiones (Paris, France)
- 1896: El Hombre y la Historia (Paris, France)
- 1909: Historia Constitucional de Venezuela (Berlin, Germany)
- 1915: Discursos y Palabras (Caracas, Venezuela)
- 1916: De Hoy para Mañana (Caracas, Venezuela)
- 1931: Sinfonía inacabada y otras variaciones (Caracas, Venezuela)
- 1944: Páginas de Ayer (posthumous).

== See also ==
- Venezuela
- Presidents of Venezuela
- List of Venezuelan writers

Political offices
Preceded by Juan Vicente Gómez	President of Venezuela; 1913–1914	Succeeded by Victorino Márquez Bustillos
