= Barranquilla Plan =

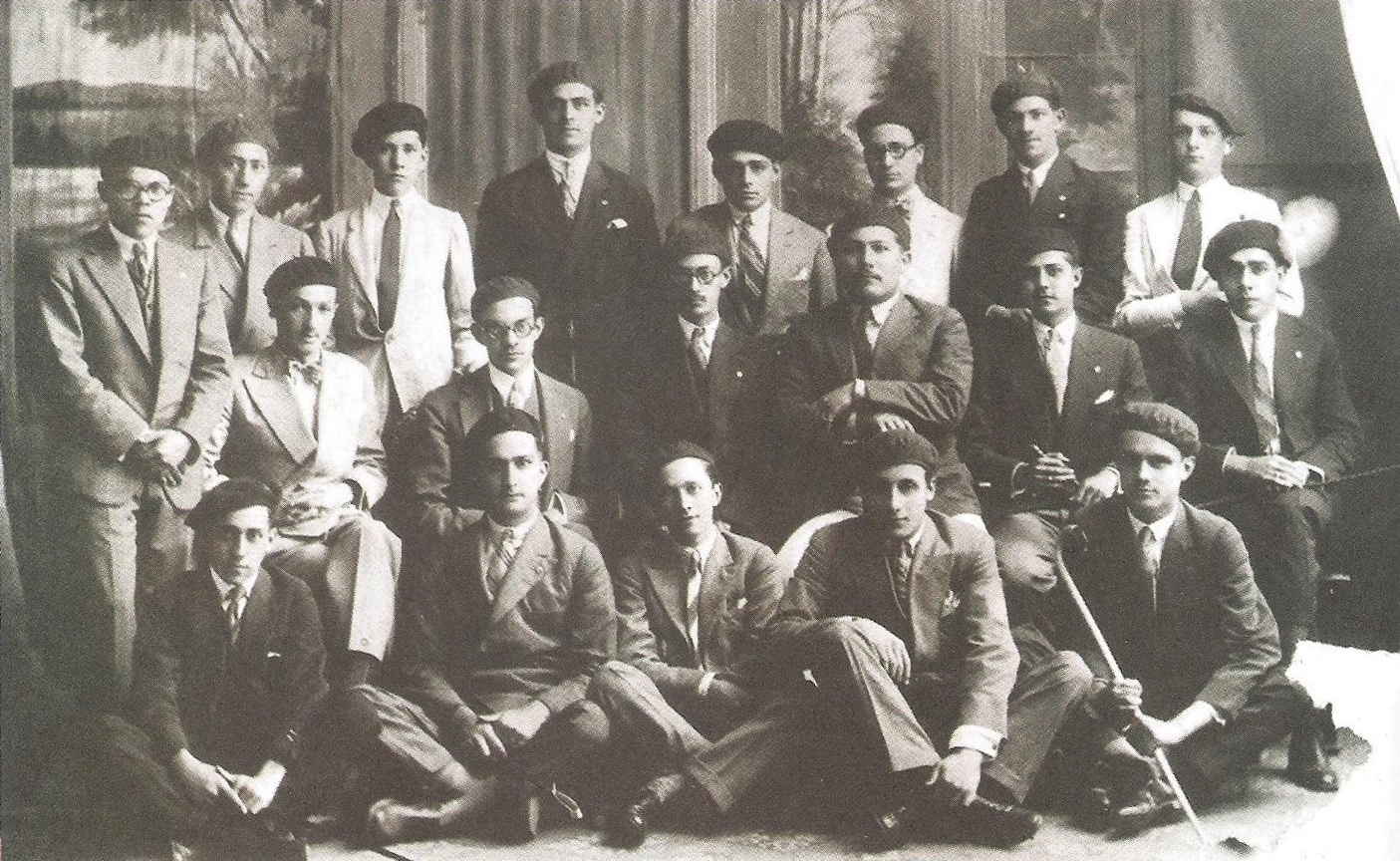
Generation of 1928.

The Barranquilla Plan was a document and political analysis signed on March 22, 1931, in the Colombian city of Barranquilla by political exiles from the Venezuelan dictatorship of Juan Vicente Gómez. The plan criticized Gómez's regime, gomecismo, transnational corporations, as well as caudillismo, latifundismo (large land estates), and capitalism. The document is regarded as the "program-manifesto" of the Agrupación Revolucionaria de Izquierda, ARDI, the precursor to the political party Democratic Action. ARDI was founded by the signatories shortly after the plan's publication in the same city.

== Content ==
The Barranquilla Plan was of a Marxist nature and advocated for the "effective protection of the urban proletariat," class struggle, opposition to labor capital and its domestic allies, freedom of the press, and literacy. However, despite being grounded in a Marxist analysis of reality, the proposal leaned toward moderate social democracy. Structurally, the document was divided into two parts: the first consisted of an analysis of Venezuelan society from the perspective of historical materialism, while the second outlined a "minimum program" of action. Several of the points established in the program included:

- Exclusion of the military from holding public office and the establishment of a civilian government.
- Freedom of expression and thought.
- Confiscation of the assets of Juan Vicente Gómez.
- Creation of a Public Health Tribunal to investigate and "punish the crimes of despotism."
- Protection of the producing class from "capitalist tyranny."
- An intensive literacy campaign for the working and peasant masses.
- University autonomy.
- Review of oil contracts and concessions.
- Convocation of a national constituent assembly.
- Rejection of the personalism and megalomania associated with gomecismo.

== Aftermath ==
The participants in the discussions began to differ over the approach the plan should take, with divided viewpoints emerging between the communists, who followed the ideas of the Communist Party of the Soviet Union and would later become the founders of the Communist Party of Venezuela, and the future founders of Democratic Action (AD) in 1941, who were not guided by foreign organizations and sought a national path. In 1931, they founded the Agrupación Revolucionaria de Izquierda, ARDI, and reached an agreement with the Communist Party of Venezuela in 1935. Although the plan was never implemented, several of the proposals and agreements developed underwent changes after the students returned to the country, and these ideas would later form the basis of the February Plan (Plan de Febrero).

== Bibliography ==
- Arráiz Lucca, Rafael (May 2007). "9". In Díaz, Fanuel Hanán; Cabezas, Lisbeth (eds.). Historia Contemporánea de Venezuela. Primer año del ciclo diversificado de la Educación Media (1era ed.). Caracas: Larense. pp. 157, 167, 168.
