= 1936 Venezuelan presidential election =

- 25 April 1936
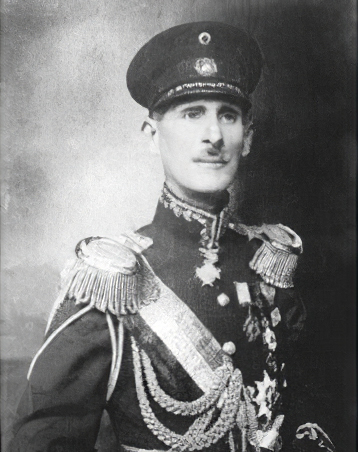

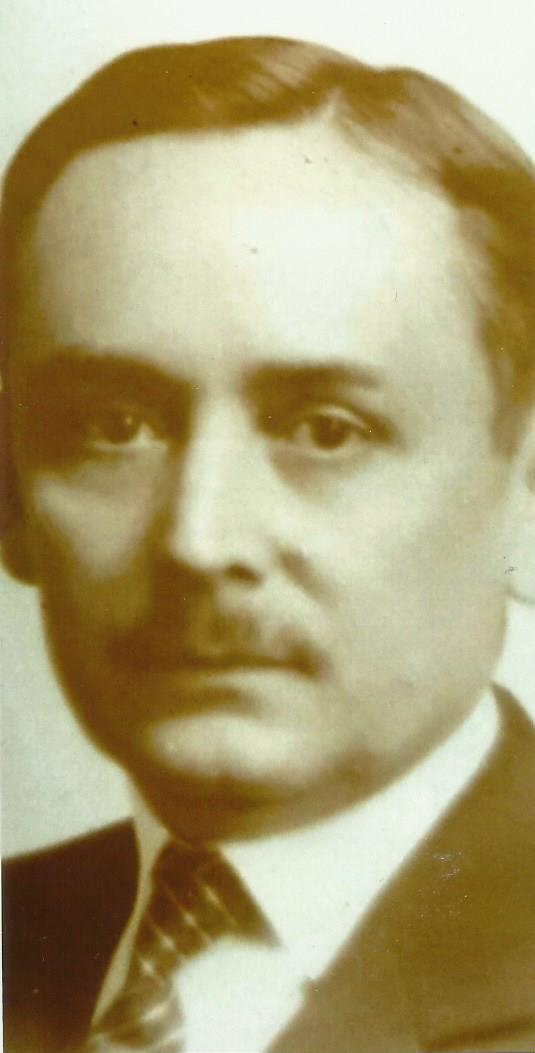
Nominee	Eleazar López Contreras	Néstor Luis Pérez
Party	Independent	Independent
Electoral vote	121	1
Percentage	99.18%	0.82%
President before election
Eleazar López Contreras
(Provisional)
Independent
Elected President
Eleazar López Contreras
Independent

Presidential elections were held in Venezuela on 28 April 1936 to elect the successor of the deceased Juan Vicente Gómez. The new president was elected by members of the Congress of Venezuela, with Eleazar López Contreras receiving 121 of the 122 votes to be elected as president for the 1936–1943 constitutional period.

== Background ==
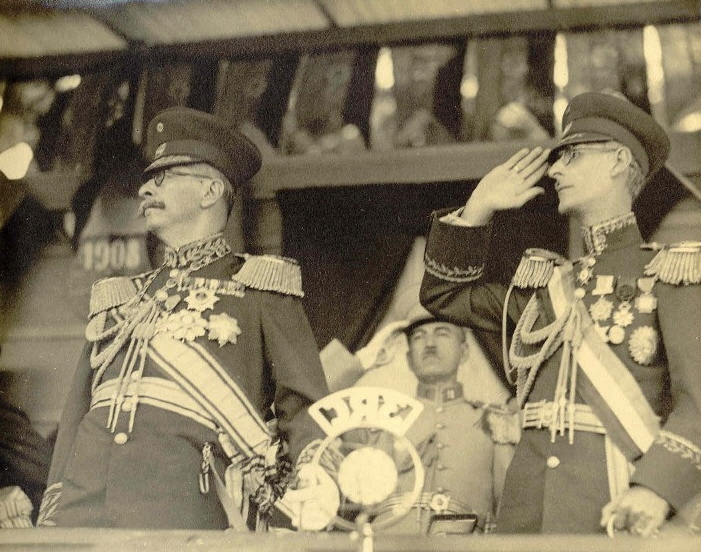
Juan Vicente Gómez (left) and Eleazar López Contreras (right) in Maracay, 1934.

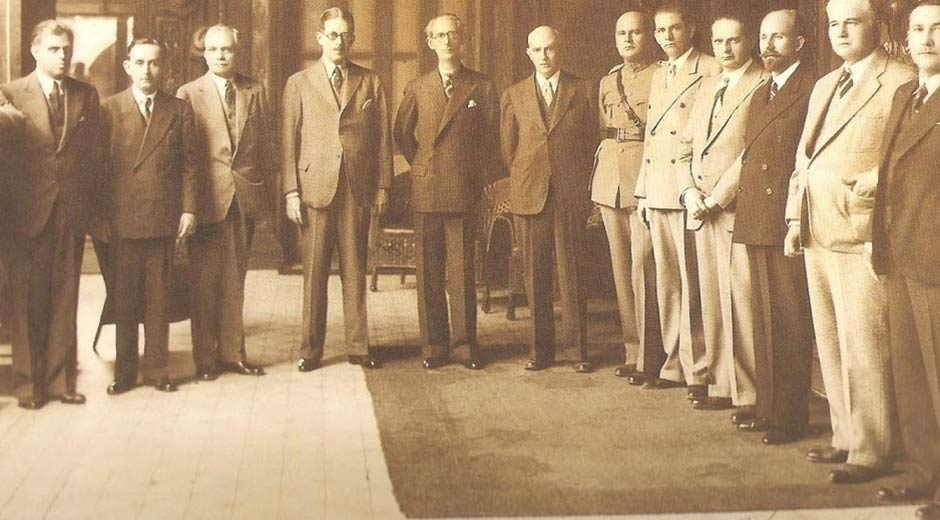
Cabinet of López Contreras, 1936.

General Juan Vicente Gómez, who had ruled Venezuela as president intermittently since 19 December 1908, died on 17 December 1935. Although ruled the country in authoritarian manner, Gómez also achieved national modernization in different areas: He created the country's first airliner (Aeropostal Alas de Venezuela), commissioned the construction of the first Venezuelan airports, building of bridges, customs buildings, the first passenger terminals of extra-urban bus lines, as well as the famous Transandean Highway. Gómez also modernized, professionalized and institutionalized the National Armed Forces, which still retains the Gomezist structure.

After the death of Gómez, the Minister of War and Navy, General Eleazar López Contreras, managed to quell a conspiracy of the Gómez's family members to obtain and perpetuate themselves in power, for which the Cabinet of Venezuela appointed him as provisional president until the holding of elections.

== Candidates ==
For these elections, the presidential candidates were the following:

- Eleazar López Contreras, military officer and politician from Queniquea, who had served as Minister of War and Navy under Gómez since 1931 and provisional president since 1935, period in which a process of democratic transition began in Venezuela.
- Néstor Luis Pérez, lawyer and politician from Maracaibo, activist opposed to the Gómez's government, who was also imprisoned in the San Carlos Prison.

== Results ==
Candidate	Votes	%
Eleazar López Contreras	121	99.18
Néstor Luis Pérez	1	0.82
Total	122	100.00
Total votes	122	–
Registered voters/turnout	123	99.19
Source: Bunimov
