= Constitution of Venezuela =

Current and 26th constitution of Venezuela

Constitution of the Bolivarian Republic of Venezuela
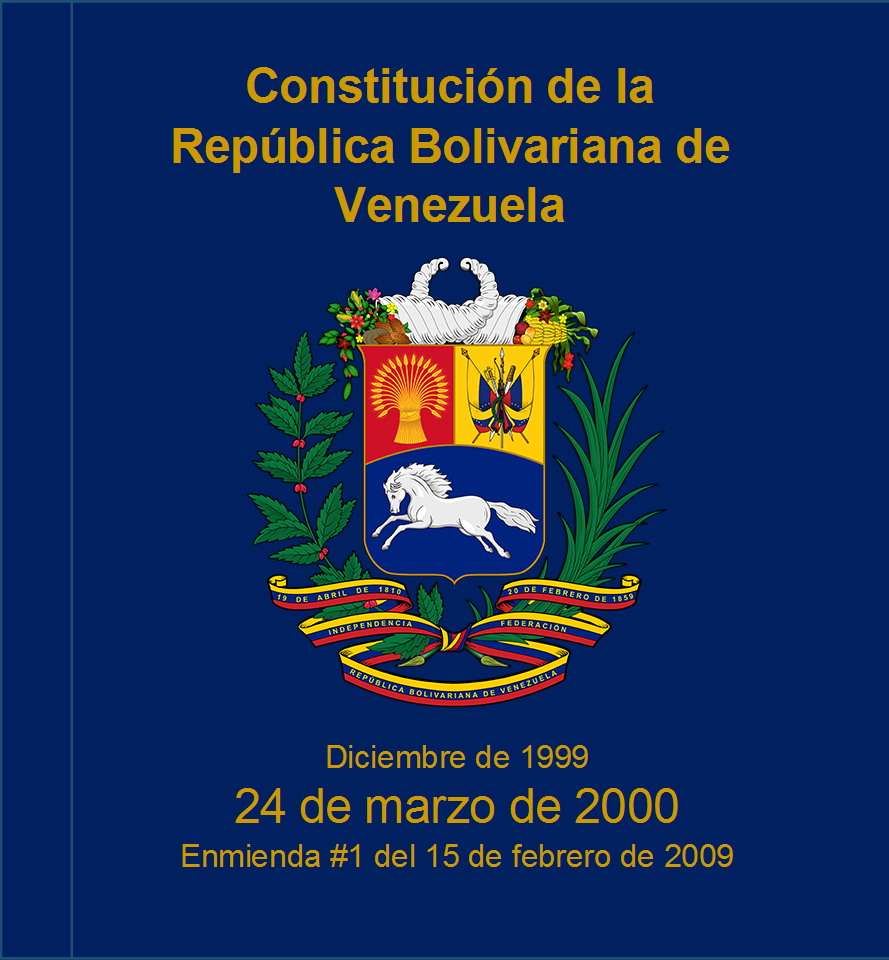
- Most recent version of the constitution

Overview
- Original title: (in Spanish) Constitución de la República Bolivariana de Venezuela
- Jurisdiction: Bolivarian Republic of Venezuela
- Created: 19 November 1999; 26 years ago
- Ratified: 15 December 1999; 26 years ago
- Date effective: 30 December 1999; 26 years ago
- System: Federal presidential constitutional republic

Government structure
- Branches: Five (executive, legislature, judiciary, electoral, citizens')
- Chambers: One
- Executive: President; Vice President
- Judiciary: Supreme Tribunal of Justice
- Federalism: Federation
- Electoral college: No
- First legislature: 2000
- First executive: 2000
- Last amended: 2009
- Signatories: 128 deputees
- Supersedes: Constitution of Venezuela (1961)

Full text
- Constitution of the Bolivarian Republic of Venezuela at Wikisource

The Constitution of the Bolivarian Republic of Venezuela (Spanish: Constitución de la República Bolivariana de Venezuela (CRBV)) is the current and twenty-sixth constitution of Venezuela. It was drafted in mid-1999 by a constituent assembly that had been created by popular referendum. Adopted in December 1999, it replaced the 1961 Constitution, the longest-serving in Venezuelan history. It was primarily promoted by then President of Venezuela Hugo Chávez and thereafter received strong backing from diverse sectors, including figures involved in promulgating the 1961 constitution such as Luis Miquilena and Carlos Andrés Pérez. Chávez and his followers (chavistas) refer to the 1999 document as the "Constitución Bolivariana" (the "Bolivarian Constitution") because they assert that it is ideologically descended from the thinking and political philosophy of Simón Bolívar and Bolivarianism.

The Constitution of 1999 was the first constitution approved by popular referendum in Venezuelan history, and summarily inaugurated the so-called "Fifth Republic of Venezuela" due to the socioeconomic changes foretold in its pages, as well as the official change in Venezuela's name from the República de Venezuela ("Republic of Venezuela") to the República Bolivariana de Venezuela ("Bolivarian Republic of Venezuela"). Major changes are made to the structure of Venezuela's government and responsibilities, while a much greater number of human rights are enshrined in the document as guaranteed to all Venezuelans – including free education up to tertiary level, free health care, access to a clean environment, right of minorities (especially indigenous peoples) to uphold their own traditional cultures, religions, and languages, among others. The 1999 Constitution, with 350 articles, is among the world's longest, most complicated, and most comprehensive constitutions.

One of the outstanding differences between Venezuelan and most of the other constitutions of the Americas is the lack of the possibility of impeachment of the president by the national parliament. Instead, the president can be removed from office either by citizens through a recall referendum or by decision of the Supreme Tribunal of Justice.

== Origins ==
=== Conceptualization ===
President Hugo Chávez was first elected under the provisions of the 1961 Constitution in the presidential election of 6 December 1998. Chávez had been contemplating a constitutional convention for Venezuela as an ideal means to rapidly bring about sweeping and radical social change to Venezuela beginning from the eve of his 1992 coup attempt.

After his imprisonment and release, he began to seek a political career with such a convention as its political goal. In the buildup to the 1998 presidential elections, one of Chávez's promises was to organise a referendum asking the people if they wanted to convene a National Constituent Assembly. His very first decree as president was to order a referendum, which took place on 19 April. The electorate were asked two questions – whether a constituent assembly should be convened, and whether it should follow the mechanisms proposed by the president. 92% of voters approved calling a constituent assembly and 86% approved the electoral system suggested by Chávez.

=== Election of the Constituent assembly ===
Elections were then held, on 25 July, to elect 131 deputies to the Constituent Assembly, which convened and debated proposals during the remainder of 1999. Members of Chávez's MVR and allied parties formed the Polo Patriotico ("Patriotic Axis"). The alliance went on to win 121 of the 131 seats in the Constituent assembly.

=== The "judicial emergency committee" ===
Conflict soon arose between the Constituent assembly and the older institutions it was supposed to reform or replace. During his 1998 presidential campaign, and in advance of the 25 July elections to the Assembly, Chávez had maintained that the new body would immediately have precedence over the existing Congress and the courts, including the power to dissolve them if it so chose. Against this, some of his opponents, including notably the Chief Justice of the Supreme Court, Cecilia Sosa Gomez, argued that the Constituent assembly must remain subordinate to the existing institutions until the constitution it produced had been ratified.

In mid August 1999, the Constituent assembly moved to restructure the nation's judiciary, claiming the power to fire judges, seeking to expedite the investigations of corruption outstanding against what The New York Times estimated were nearly half of the nation's 4700 judges, clerks, and bailiffs. On 23 August, the Supreme Court voted 8–6 that the Assembly was not acting unconstitutionally in assuming those powers; however, the next day Cecilia Sosa Gomez resigned in protest. Over 190 judges were eventually suspended on charges of corruption.

On 25 August, the Constituent assembly declared a "legislative emergency," voting to limit the Congress's work to matters such as supervising the budget and communications. In response, the Congress, which in July had decided to go into recess until October to avoid conflict with the Constituent assembly, declared its recess over, effective 27 August.

At one point the Constituent assembly prohibited the Congress from holding meetings of any sort. However, on 10 September, the two bodies reached an agreement allowing for their "coexistence" until the new constitution took effect.

=== Framing of the new constitution ===
Afterward, over the span of a mere 60 days in late 1999, the new and voter-approved Constituent assembly would frame and found a document that enshrined as constitutional law most of the structural changes Chávez desired. Chávez stated such changes were necessary in order to successfully and comprehensively enact his planned social justice programs. Sweeping changes in Venezuelan governmental structure were to be made; Chávez's plan was, stemming from his 1998 campaign pledges, thus to dramatically open up Venezuelan political discourse to independent and third parties by radically altering the national political context. In the process, Chávez sought to fatally paralyse his AD and COPEI opposition. All Chávez's aims were, in one move, dramatically furthered.

=== Ratification by popular referendum ===
On 19 November 1999 the National Assembly voted on the draft which was proposed for the December 1999 Venezuelan constitutional referendum on 15 December 1999 and approved with a 72% "yes" vote (audited by the National Electoral Council). The new constitution then legally came into full effect the following 30 December when it was published in the official gazette.

== Text and guiding doctrines ==
The text of the constitution is a hybrid of jurisprudential and political norms drawn from sources as wide as Simón Bolívar's writings on constitutionality and popular sovereignty, José Martí, the Peruvian Marxist José Carlos Mariátegui, and Evgeny Pashukanis. While it retains a strong liberal-democratic base, it introduces elements of direct democracy such as elements of popular sovereignty ( consultative or recall referendums), social responsibilities, right to rebel against the violation of the constitutional system (articles 333 and 350) and the independence of the republic from foreign domination. Besides these elements, separation of powers (albeit with two new branches of government) and rights of property, expression and strike were mainly kept the same as on the previous constitution.

== Innovations of the new constitution ==
The Constituent assembly itself drafted the new 1999 Venezuelan constitution. With 350 articles, the document was, as drafted, one of the world's lengthiest constitutions.

=== Name of the state ===
Despite the initial reluctance of the constituent assembly's deputies, it changed the country's official name from the "Republic of Venezuela" to the "Bolivarian Republic of Venezuela".

=== Five branches of government ===
Significant changes were made to the separation of powers. Instead of the usual three branches of government, the new Bolivarian Republic of Venezuela has five (Article 136):

1. The executive branch (the Presidency).
2. The legislative branch (the National Assembly).
3. The judicial branch (the judiciary).
4. The electoral branch (poder electoral, or "electoral power").
5. The citizens' branch (poder ciudadano, or "citizens' power").

The electoral branch is headed by the National Electoral Council (CNE) and is responsible for the independent oversight of all elections in the country: municipal, state, and federal. The citizens' branch is constituted by the ombudsman (defensor del pueblo or "defender of the people"), the attorney general (fiscal general), and the comptroller general (contralor general). It is responsible for representing and defending the citizens in their dealings with powers of the Venezuelan state. The legislative branch was changed from a bicameral system to a unicameral system.

=== A strengthened and recallable presidency and the creation of a functioning vice-presidency ===
It also increased the presidential term of office from five to six years, subject to a limit of two terms. The document also introduced provisions for national presidential recall referendums – that is, Venezuelan voters now were to be given the right to remove their president from office before the expiration of the presidential term. Such referendums were to be activated upon provision of petitions with a valid number of signatures. The new provision was activated for the first time when such a referendum was held in 2004, but it failed to receive majority support. See 2004 Venezuelan recall referendum. The Presidency was also strengthened, aside from being the Chief Executive, head of state and head of government, with the power to dissolve the National Assembly under certain conditions, and can issue decrees that has the force of law, upon authorization by the National Assembly.

In 2009, term limits (not only that for president) were abolished by a referendum.

And a post of vice-president was recreated to direct the day-to-day operations of the government and to exercise duties and powers that may delegated by the President as well as to act as the chief operating officer of government and the cabinet. The vice-president can be removed via impeachment by the National Assembly. The vice-president is also politically responsible to the National Assembly side by side with the ministers of Cabinet. Upon the vacancy of the office of the president upon death, recall, resignation or impeachment by the STJ, the vice president thus assumes the office and title of the presidency. This happened in March of 2013 when Nicolas Maduro, who won the vice presidency the year before, assumed the presidency upon the death of Hugo Chavez.

=== Unicameral and weakened legislature ===
The new constitution also converted the formerly bicameral Congress into a unicameral legislature, and stripped it of many of its former powers. Thus, the new single-chamber National Assembly dropped the prior traditional arrangement of the bifurcation of legislative powers between a Chamber of Deputies and a Senate. In addition, the legislative branch's powers were substantially reduced and transferred to the President of Venezuela.

=== The Public Defender ===
Provision was also made for a new position, the Public Defender (Defensoría del Pueblo), which was to be an ombudsman office with the authority to check the activities of the presidency, the National Assembly, and the constitution – Chávez styled such a defender as the guardian of the so-called 'moral branch' of the Venezuelan government, tasked with defending public and moral interests.

This is an idea derived from Bolivar's constitutionalism.

=== Public examination for judicial candidates ===
Lastly, the Venezuelan judiciary was reformed. Judges would, under the new constitution, be installed after passing public examinations and not, as in the old manner, be appointed by the National Assembly.

==== Health care ====
As Articles 83–85 under Title III of the 1999 Venezuelan Constitution enshrine free and quality healthcare as a human right guaranteed to all Venezuelan citizens, the Hugo Chávez administration attempted to fulfill its constitutional obligations via the Barrio Adentro program. Notably, Article 84 under Title III mandate that the healthcare furnished through such public programmes as Barrio Adentro be publicly funded, and explicitly forbids privatization under any circumstance. The relevant text from the 1999 Bolivarian Constitution reads:

Article 83: Health is a fundamental social right and the responsibility of the State, which shall guarantee it as part of the right to life. The State shall promote and develop policies oriented toward improving the quality of life, common welfare and access to services. All persons have the right to protection of health, as well as the duty to participate actively in the furtherance and protection of the same, and to comply with such health and hygiene measures as may be established by law, and in accordance with international conventions and treaties signed and ratified by the Republic.

Article 84: In order to guarantee the right to health, the State creates, exercises guidance over and administers a national public health system that crosses sector boundaries, and is decentralized and participatory in nature, integrated with the social security system and governed by the principles of gratuity, universality, completeness, fairness, social integration and solidarity. The public health system gives priority to promoting health and preventing disease, guaranteeing prompt treatment and quality rehabilitation. Public health assets and services are the property of the State and shall not be privatized. The organized community has the right and duty to participate in the making- of decisions concerning policy planning, implementation and control at public health institutions.

Article 85: Financing of the public health system is the responsibility of the State, which shall integrate the revenue resources, mandatory Social Security contributions and any other sources of financing provided for by law. The State guarantees a health budget such as to make possible the attainment of health policy objectives. In coordination with universities and research centers, a national professional and technical training policy and a national industry to produce health care supplies shall be promoted and developed. The State shall regulate both public and private health care institutions.

=== Changes to businesses ===
Article 308 of Title VI the Venezuelan constitution showed a changed view on businesses. This article sought to introduce support for alternative management of businesses. Mentioned in the article are cooperatives, family-owned businesses, small businesses and savings funds. The government supported these alternatives as a way to democratize capital and challenge oligopolistic control of the economy.

== Amendments ==
Amendments proposed by President Chávez and parliament were twice decided in referendums:

- 2007 Venezuelan constitutional referendum – wide-ranging amendments were very narrowly rejected;
- 2009 Venezuelan constitutional referendum – abolition of term limits for various public offices (including President; a proposal to abolish Chávez's term limits was present also in 2007 amendments) was narrowly approved.

== Pre-1999 constitutions ==
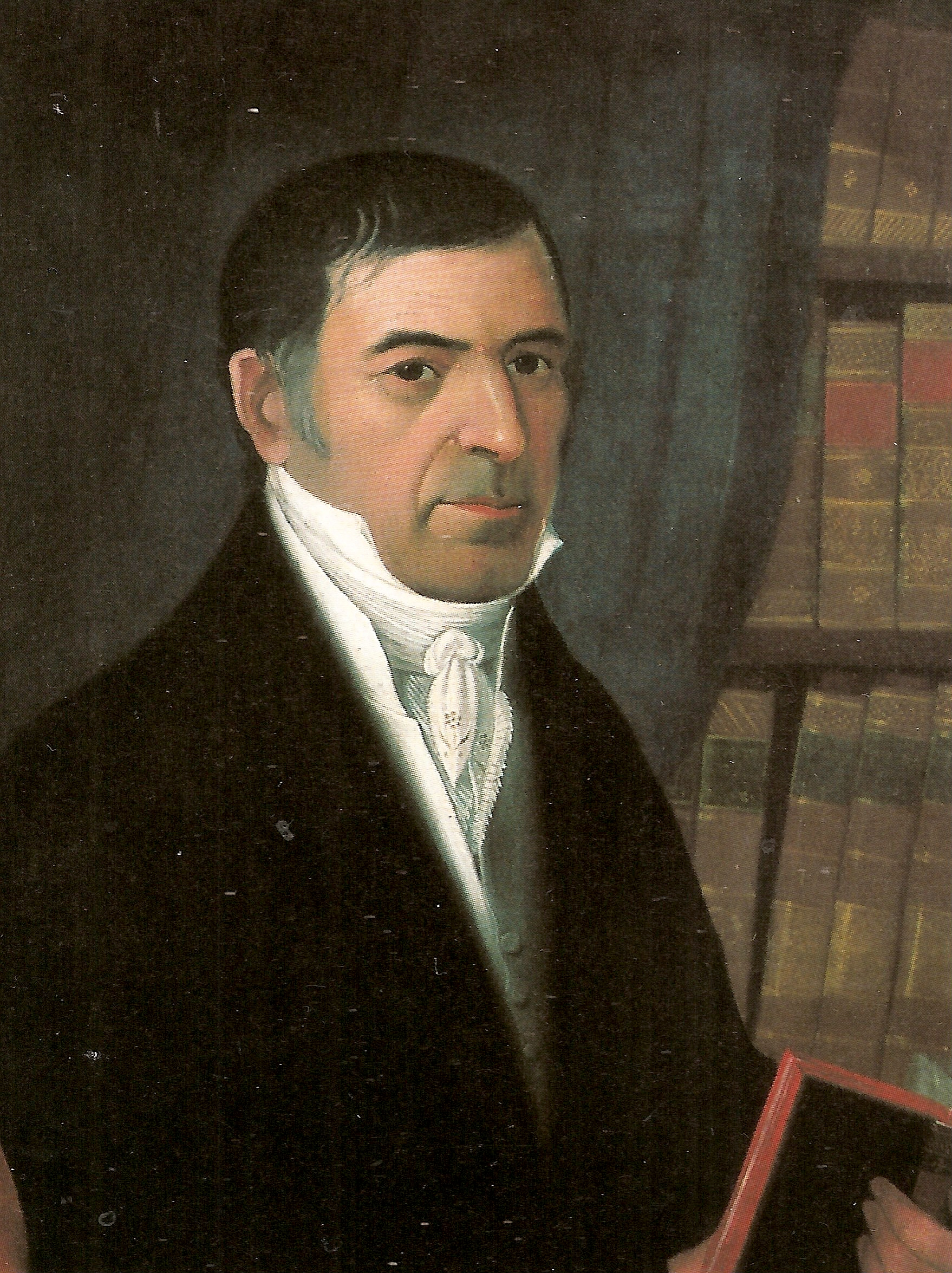
Cristóbal Mendoza

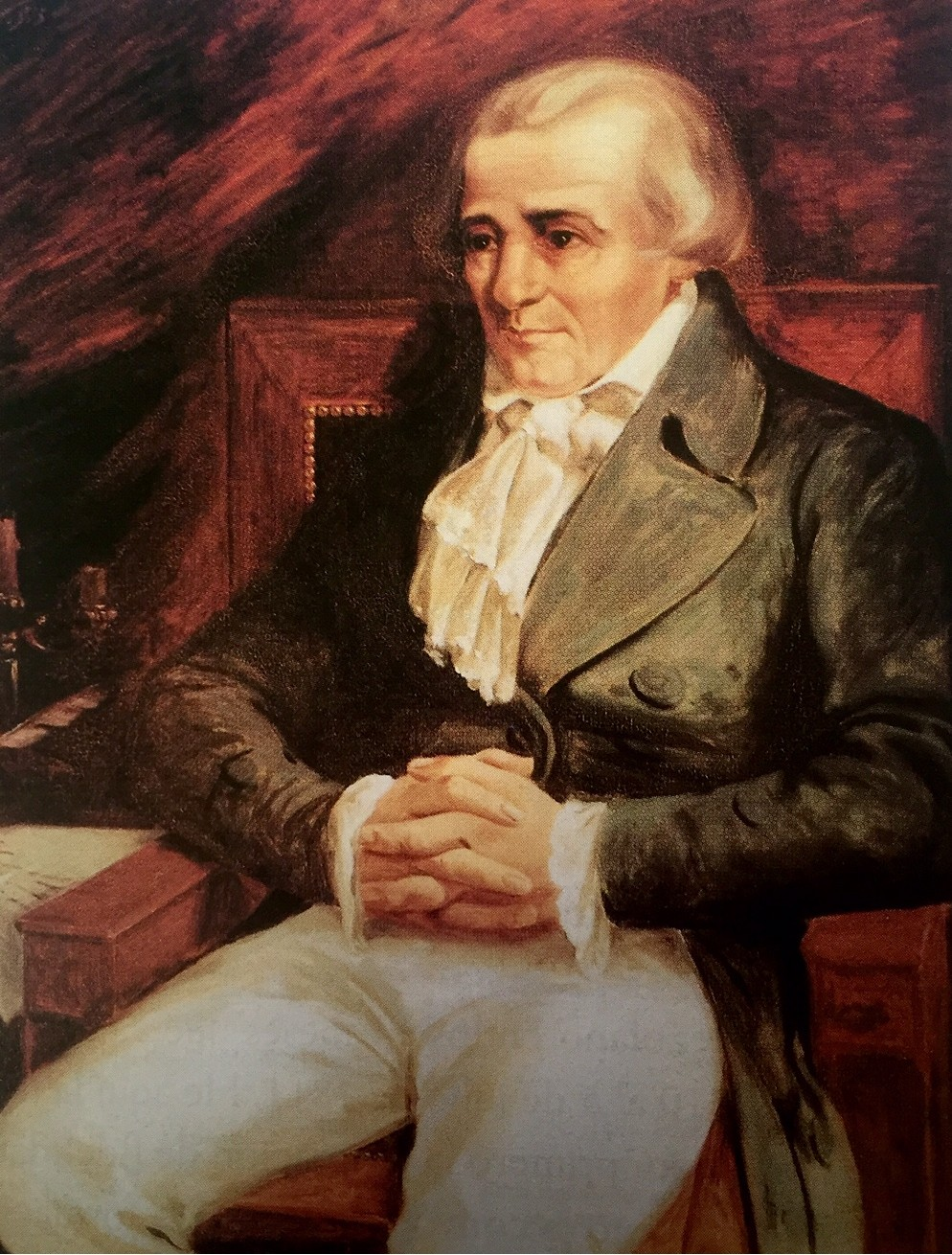
Juan Germán Roscio

Autors of the first Constitution of Venezuela and Latin America

Venezuela had numerous constitutions in its history:

- Constitution of Venezuela (1811). The 1811 Constitution of Venezuela was the first Constitution of Venezuela and Latin America, promulgated and drafted by Cristóbal Mendoza and Juan Germán Roscio and sanctioned by the Constituent Congress of 1811 in the city of Caracas on 21 December 1811. It established a federal government but was repealed on 21 July 1812, by the capitulation of Francisco de Miranda in San Mateo.
- Constitution of Venezuela (1819). It was proposed by Simón Bolívar to the Angostura Congress in order to politically organize the Republic after the reconquest by the Liberating Army.
- Colombian Constitution of 1821
- Constitution of Venezuela (1830). The Constitution of 1830 arose as a result of the separation of the Department of Venezuela from Great Colombia to constitute Venezuela.
- Constitution of Venezuela (1857). This Constitution adopted by the Congress of the Republic on 16 April 1857, the purpose of it was to increase the presidential term to six years, the President can be reelected and centralize the organization of the state.
- Constitution of Venezuela (1858). This new Constitution granted more autonomy to the Provinces, the election of the President, Vice President and other officials by universal, direct and secret ballot. It established the presidential term of 5 years.
- Constitution of Venezuela (1864). It consecrated the federal system, in which the states would be independent and would unite to form the nation with the name of the United States of Venezuela. The President to be elected by direct and secret vote, with a term of office of 4 years.
- Constitution of Venezuela (1874)
- Constitution of Venezuela (1881). Reduced the 20 states of the Federation to 9 and created the Great Federal Council, in charge of electing the President.
- Constitution of Venezuela (1891)
- Constitution of Venezuela (1893). Direct and secret elections to elect the President, eliminated the Federal Council and created a Governing Council, composed of 9 members (one for each State) appointed by Congress every 4 years. The President of that body acted as Vice President of the Republic.
- Constitution of Venezuela (1901). The Governing Council is eliminated, the presidential period rose to 6 years, eliminated the universal and direct suffrage, put in the hands of the Municipal Councils election of the President of the Republic. The territory was divided into 20 States.
- Constitution of Venezuela (1904). A reform of the electoral system for the Municipal Councils and Legislative Assemblies.
- Constitution of Venezuela (1909). Replaced the direct election of the President; returned to the presidential term of 4 years.
- Constitution of Venezuela (1914)
- Constitution of Venezuela (1922). Repealed the Provisional Constitutional Statute of 1914.
- Constitution of Venezuela (1925). Marked foundations of a Unitary Presidential Republic.
- Constitution of Venezuela (1928). Prohibited communist propaganda. Clarified powers of the President.
- Constitution of Venezuela (1931). President of the Republic proclaimed the Commander in Chief of the Army.
- Constitution of Venezuela (1936). The presidential term was set to 5 years. It was partially renovated in 1945.
- Constitution of Venezuela (1947). The President, the congressmen, members of Legislative Assemblies and councilors elected by universal, direct and secret vote.
- Constitution of Venezuela (1953). The name of Republic of Venezuela, which had been replaced by the United States of Venezuela in the constitution of 1864, is reestablished.The voting age was set to 21 years.
- Constitution of Venezuela (1961)
- Constitution of Venezuela (1999), current

The Law was changed 23 times since 1811, the new Constitution is adopted, on average, every ten years. The most significant changes are those contained in the Fundamental Laws of 1811, 1830, 1864, 1936, 1947, 1961 and 1999.

== See also ==
- Constitutional law
- Constitutional economics
