= United States of Venezuela =

Republic from 1864 to 1953

United States of Venezuela Estados Unidos de Venezuela (Spanish)
- 1864–1953
- Flag (1930–1953) (Note: Remained as the national flag and the civil ensign until 2006.) Coat of arms
- Motto: "Dios y Federación" (Spanish) ("God and Federation")
- Anthem: Gloria al Bravo Pueblo ("Glory to the Brave People") (since 1881)
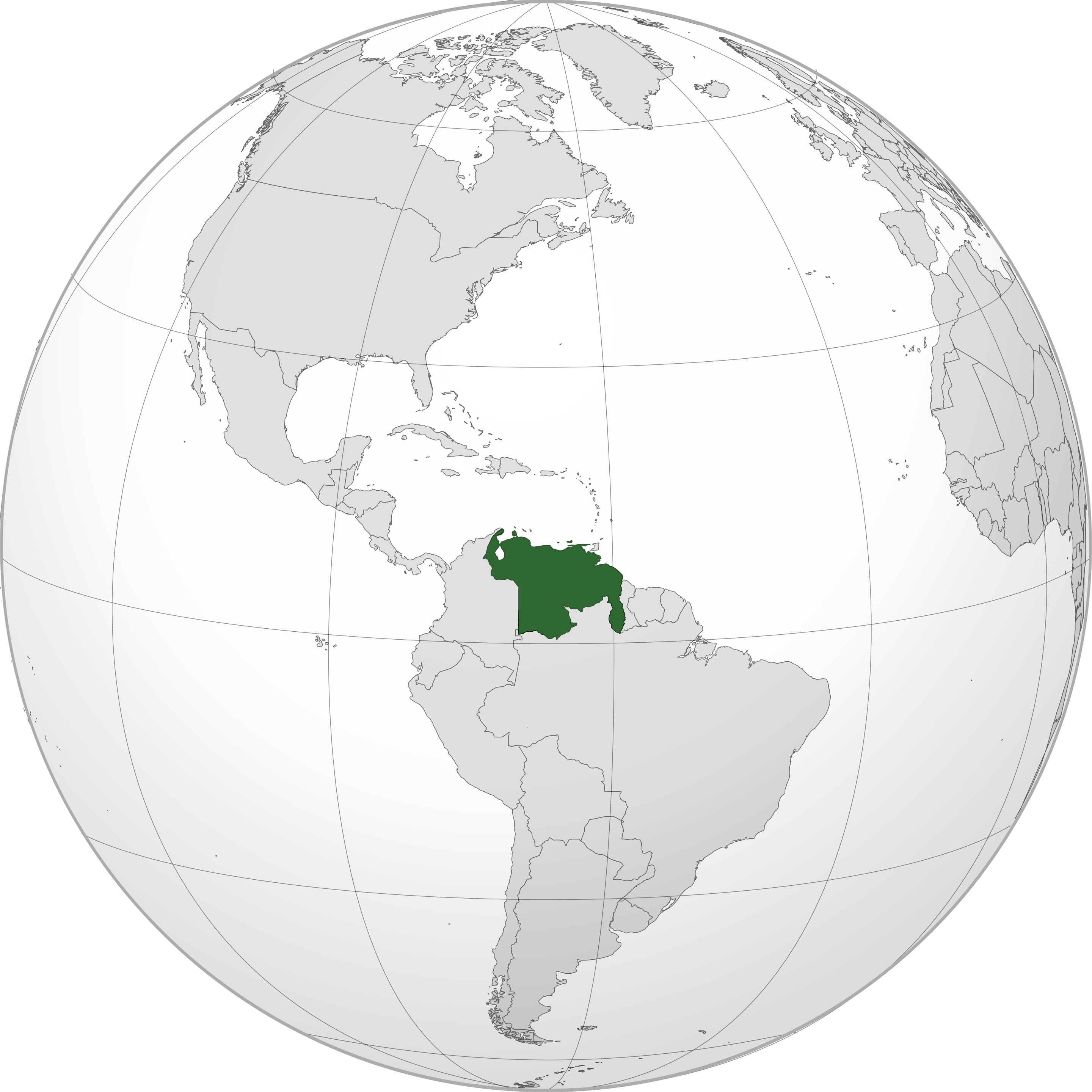
- The United States of Venezuela in 1870
- Capital: Caracas
- Common languages: Spanish
- Religion: None
- Demonyms: Venezolano (male); Venezolana (female)
- Government: Federal presidential republic
- President
  - 1864–1868: Juan Crisóstomo Falcón (first)
  - 1952–1953: Marcos Pérez Jiménez (last)
- Vice President
  - 1864–1868: Antonio Leocadio Guzmán
- Legislature: Unicameral Congress
- Historical era: Mid 19th – Mid 20th centuries
  - End of the Federal War: 13 April 1864
  - 24th Constitution adopted: 11 April 1953

Area
- 1891: 1,448,919 km^{2} (559,431 sq mi)

Population
  - 1891: 2,323,527
- Currency: Peso (until 1871); Venezolano (1871–1879); Bolívar (since 1879)
- ISO 3166 code: VE
Preceded by	Succeeded by
State of Venezuela	Republic of Venezuela
- Today part of: Venezuela; Guyana; Brazil; Colombia

The United States of Venezuela (Spanish: Estados Unidos de Venezuela) was the official name of Venezuela, which adopted in its 1864 constitution under the Juan Crisóstomo Falcón government. This remained the official name until 1953, when the constitution of that year renamed it the Republic of Venezuela. In 1999 under newly elected president Hugo Chávez and his modification to the Constitution, Venezuela's official name became the Bolivarian Republic of Venezuela.

== Flag ==
The United States of Venezuela used three official flags in its time:

1863–1905
Decree of Juan Crisóstomo Falcón

1905–1930
Decree of Cipriano Castro

1930–1954
Decree of Juan Vicente Gómez

== History ==
=== Original name ===
From 1830 to 1857 the official name of the country was Spanish: Estado de Venezuela ("State of Venezuela"). The 1858 constitution gave it the official name Spanish: República de Venezuela ("Republic of Venezuela"). After the Liberal Party (Partido Liberal) won power in the Federal War it called for a constitutional convention, to establish the constitution on federal principles. On 28 March 1864, members of the convention met in Caracas to sign it. President Falcón ordered its publication and circulation on 13 April, and on 22 April it was finally ratified by the Ministers of the Interior and Justice, Finance, Development, and War and Sea.

=== Change of name ===
The 1953 constitution included a transitional provision to change the official name from Estados Unidos de Venezuela ("United States of Venezuela") to República de Venezuela ("Republic of Venezuela"). The next constitution, of 1961, confirmed the new name. Venezuela is currently, under the new Constitution of 1999, officially known as the Bolivarian Republic of Venezuela (Spanish: República Bolivariana de Venezuela),

== Geography ==
=== Borders ===
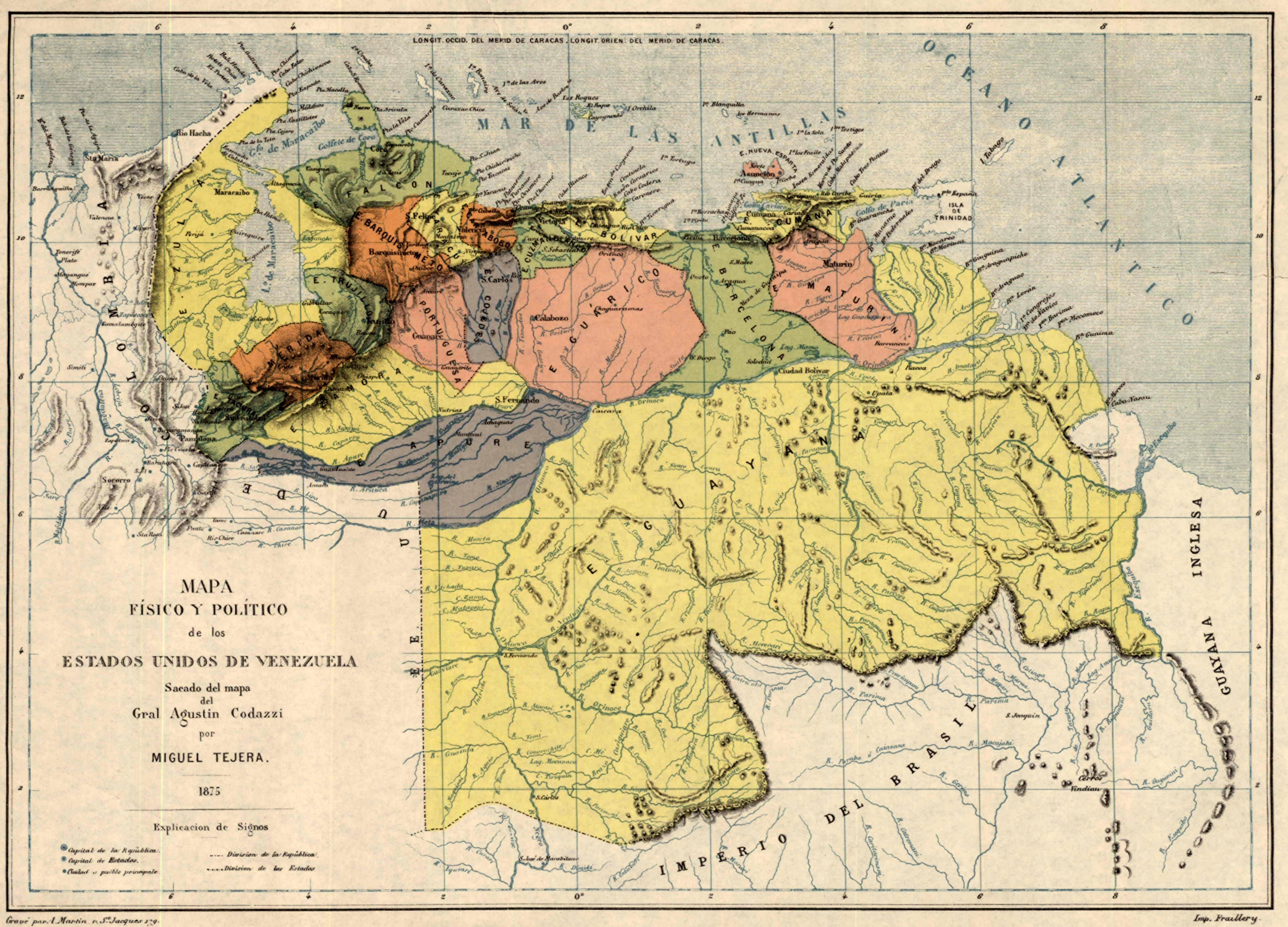
Map of Venezuela in 1875

Map of the United States of Venezuela in 1932

The 1864 constitution established the borders of the United States of Venezuela to be the same of those of the 1810 Captaincy General of Venezuela. This statement has been preserved throughout subsequent constitutions.

Because of a long-running territorial dispute between the United States of Venezuela and the United Kingdom over the Essequibo region, several countries called for an international court of justice to settle the matter, which was held in Paris in 1899, and ruled in the UK's favour. From 1900 to 1905, Venezuela participated in the Joint Committee of the British-Venezuelan Border for the final demarcation between the two countries, which was signed in September 1907. In 1932, Juan Vicente Gómez agreed a point on the summit of Mount Roraima as the three-way boundary between Brazil, British Guiana and Venezuela.

In 1941, President Eleazar López Contreras and the Colombian President signed the Venezuela–Colombia Boundary Treaty of 1941, the border treaty between the two countries, which ceded 108,000 square kilometres (42,000 square miles) of territory to Colombia.

=== Subdivisions ===
==== 1864 ====
The 1864 constitution gave these former provinces the status as states:

- Apure
- Aragua
- Barcelona
- Barinas
- Barquisimeto
- Carabobo
- Caracas
- Cojedes
- Coro
- Sucre (Cumaná)
- Guárico
- Bolívar (Guayana)
- Nueva Esparta (Margarita Island)
- Monagas (Maturín)
- Mérida
- Portuguesa
- Táchira
- Trujillo
- Yaracuy
- Zulia (Maracaibo)

It was stated that the boundaries would remain as in 1856.

==== 1881 ====
The 1881 constitution merged the states created in 1864 into eight, larger states:

- Oriente: comprising Barcelona, Cumaná and Maturín.
- Guzmán Blanco: comprising Bolívar, Guzmán Blanco (Aragua), Guárico and Nueva Esparta.
- Carabobo: comprising Carabobo and Nirgua.
- Sur de Occidente: comprising Cojedes, Portuguesa and Zamora (Barinas).
- Norte de Occidente: comprising Barquisimeto and Yaracuy, except for Nirgua.
- Los Andes: comprising Guzmán (Mérida), Trujillo and Táchira.
- Bolívar: comprising Guayana and Apure.
- Falcón Zulia: comprising Zulia and Coro.

==== 1891 ====
The 1891 constitution established new state boundaries:

- Bermúdez: comprising Barcelona, Cumaná and Maturín.
- Miranda: comprising Bolívar, Guzmán Blanco, Guárico and Nueva Esparta.
- Carabobo: comprising Carabobo and Nirgua.
- Zamora: comprising Cojedes, Portuguesa and Zamora.
- Lara: comprising Barquisimeto and Yaracuy, but excluding the Nirgua department.
- Los Andes: comprising Guzmán, Trujillo and Táchira.
- Bolívar: comprising Guayana and Apure.
- Zulia: unitary state.
- Falcón: unitary state.

==== 1901 ====
The 1901 constitution established new divisions of the states:

- Apure
- Aragua
- Bolívar (previously Guayana)
- Barcelona
- Carabobo
- Cojedes
- Falcón (previously Coro)
- Guárico
- Lara (previously Barquisimeto)
- Mérida
- Miranda (previously Caracas)
- Maturín
- Sucre (previously Cumaná)
- Nueva Esparta (previously Margarita)
- Portuguesa
- Táchira
- Trujillo
- Yaracuy
- Zamora (previously Barinas)
- Zulia (previously Maracaibo)

==== 1904 ====
New division of territory:

- Aragua
- Bermúdez
- Bolívar
- Carabobo
- Falcón
- Guárico
- Lara
- Mérida
- Miranda
- Táchira
- Trujillo
- Zamora
- Zulia

==== 1909 ====
Another division of territory, and new names for some of the states:

- Distrito Federal
- Anzoátegui
- Apure
- Aragua
- Bolívar
- Carabobo
- Cojedes
- Falcón
- Guárico
- Lara
- Mérida
- Miranda
- Monagas
- Nueva Esparta
- Portuguesa
- Sucre
- Táchira
- Trujillo
- Yaracuy
- Zamora
- Zulia
- Federal territories: Amazonas and Delta Amacuro

==== 1925 ====
Creation of the Federal Dependencies of Venezuela (Spanish: Dependencias federales), shore islands belonging to Venezuela in the Caribbean Sea and Gulf of Venezuela.

However, Margarita Island (Spanish: Isla Margarita or Isla de Margarita) became part of the State of Nueva Esparta.

==== 1928 ====
Coche Island (Spanish: Isla de Coche) was incorporated into the State of Nueva Esparta.

Minor changes under Juan V. Gòmez.

==== 1947 ====
The state of Zamora was renamed to Barinas and Cubagua Island (Spanish: Isla de Cubagua) was incorporated into Nueva Esparta.

== Politics and government ==
=== Constitutions ===
After the 1864 Constitution of the United States of Venezuela, there were several revisions under different governments.

These were in 1874, 1881, 1891, 1893, 1901, 1904, 1909, 1914, 1922, 1925, 1928, 1929, 1931, 1936, 1945.

After a Decree of the Revolutionary Government, the constitution was revised further in 1947 and 1953.
