= Congress of Venezuela =

Legislature of Venezuela until 1999

Congress of the Republic of Venezuela
- Coat of arms of Venezuela

Type
- Type: Bicameral
- Houses: Upper house: Senate of Venezuela; Lower house: Venezuelan Chamber of Deputies

History
- Established: 1811
- Disbanded: 1999
- Succeeded by: National Assembly of Venezuela

Meeting place
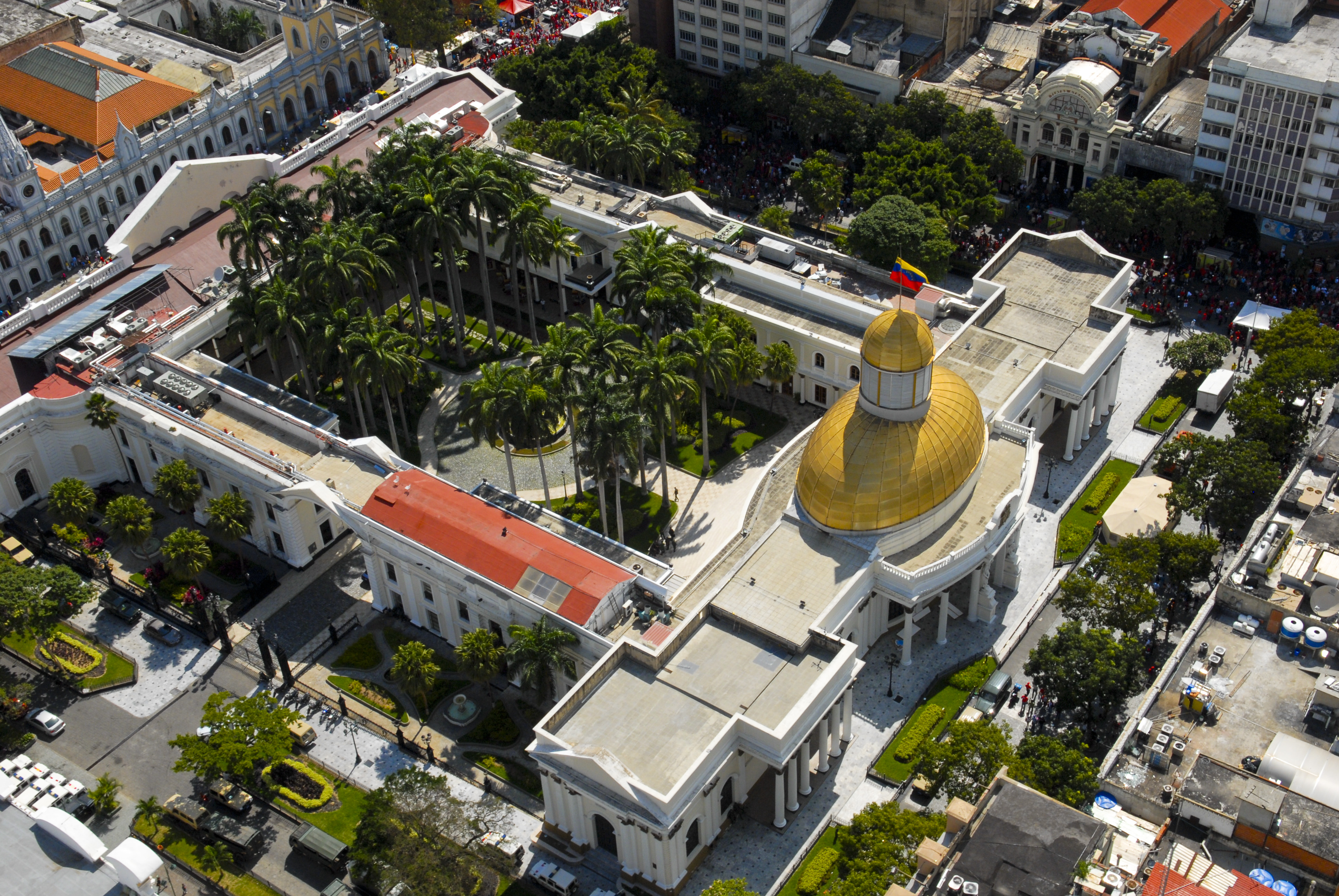
- Palacio Federal Legislativo, Caracas

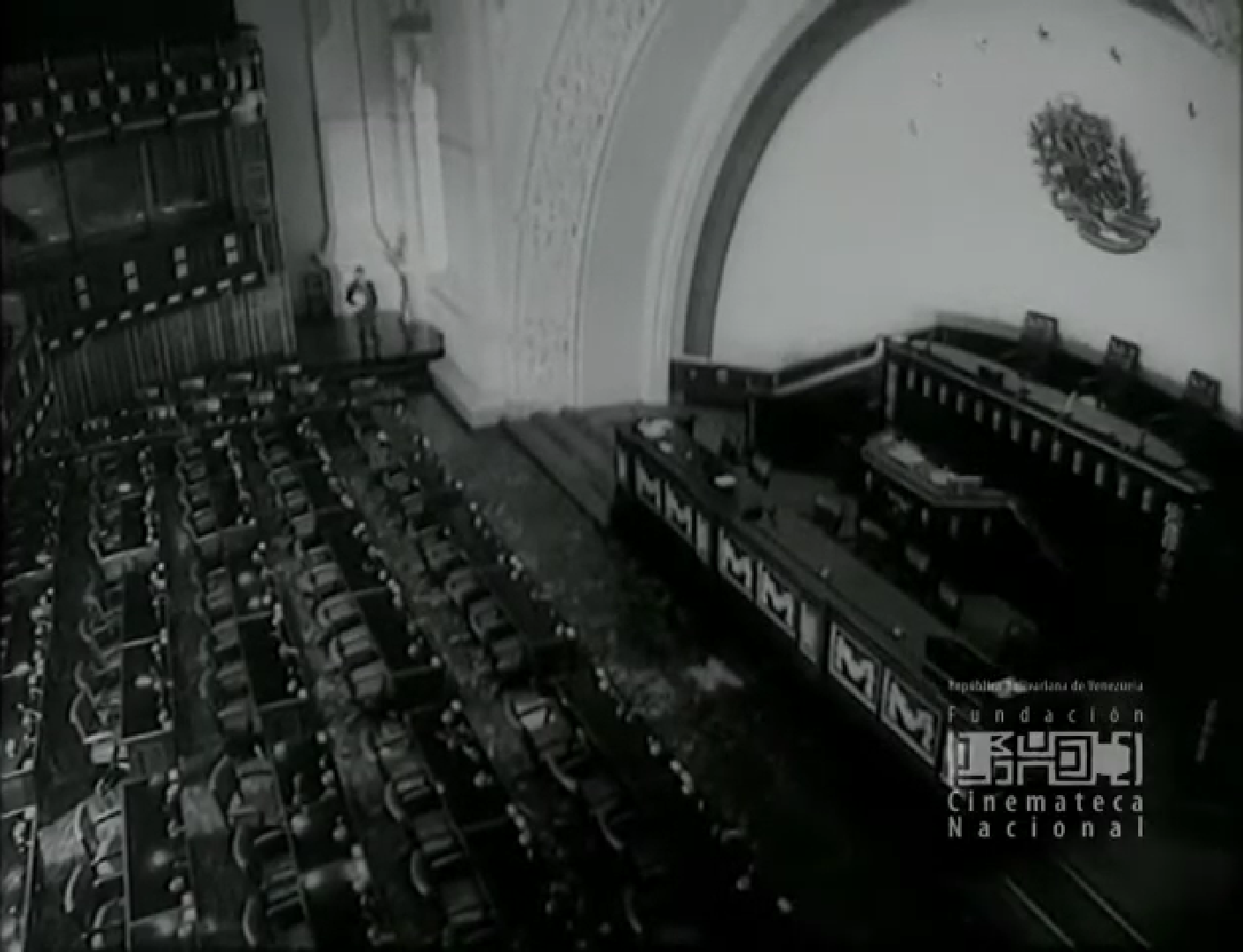
Hemicycle of the National Congress as shown in the 1963 film Cuentos para mayores

The Congress of the Republic, also known as the National Congress, represented the Venezuelan Legislative Branch until 1999. It had a bicameral composition: a Chamber of Senators (or Senate) and a Chamber of Deputies. The last president of the Chamber of Senators (who, in turn, served as President of Congress) was Luis Alfonso Dávila, elected senator in the State of Anzoátegui by the Socialist-leaning party Movimiento Quinta República; the last president of the Chamber of Deputies (who also served as Vice President of Congress) was Henrique Capriles Radonski, who was elected deputy in the State of Zulia by the Christian Socialist party COPEI.

Different sectors of Venezuelan political life, both in the opposition and in government, have raised the possibility that, at some point, two chambers will again function in the Venezuelan Legislative Branch, resuming their bicameral composition. However, so far these are only proposals that have been made.

== Official names ==
According to the different Constitutions that Venezuela has had:

- Congreso General de Venezuela, in Constitution of 1811 and 1819 (19 years).
- Congreso del Estado de Venezuela, in Constitution of 1830, 1857 and 1858 (34 years).
- Congreso de los Estados Unidos de Venezuela, in Constitution of 1864, 1874, 1881, 1891, 1893, 1901, 1904, 1909, 1914, 1922, 1925, 1928, 1929, 1931, 1936 and 1947 (89 years).
- Congreso de la República de Venezuela, in Constitution of 1953 and 1961 (46 years).

== Elections ==
- 1832 Venezuelan parliamentary election
- 1835 Venezuelan parliamentary election
- 1838 Venezuelan parliamentary election
- 1841 Venezuelan parliamentary election
- 1844 Venezuelan parliamentary election
- 1847 Venezuelan parliamentary election
- 1850 Venezuelan parliamentary election
- 1853 Venezuelan parliamentary election
- 1856 Venezuelan parliamentary election
- 1859 Venezuelan parliamentary election
- 1863 Venezuelan parliamentary election
- 1873 Venezuelan parliamentary election
- 1877 Venezuelan parliamentary election
- 1882 Venezuelan parliamentary election
- 1888 Venezuelan parliamentary election
- 1890 Venezuelan parliamentary election
- 1894 Venezuelan parliamentary election
- 1898 Venezuelan parliamentary election
- 1922 Venezuelan parliamentary election
- 1929 Venezuelan parliamentary election
- 1931 Venezuelan general election
- 1936 Venezuelan general election
- 1941 Venezuelan parliamentary election
- 1947 Venezuelan general election
- 1958 Venezuelan general election
- 1963 Venezuelan general election
- 1968 Venezuelan general election
- 1973 Venezuelan general election
- 1978 Venezuelan general election
- 1983 Venezuelan general election
- 1988 Venezuelan general election
- 1993 Venezuelan general election
- 1998 Venezuelan parliamentary election

== Representatives ==
Períod	Majority					First Minority			
Períod	Party	MPs	Senators	Position	Type	Party	MPs	Senators	Type
1947 - 1948	Acción Democrática	83 / 110	38 / 46	Government	Absolute		16 / 110	4 / 46	Opposition
1959 - 1964	Acción Democrática	73 / 132	32 / 51	Government	Absolute	Unión Republicana Democrática	34 / 132	11 / 51	Opposition
1964 - 1969	Acción Democrática	66 / 179	22 / 47	Government	Simple		39 / 179	8 / 47	Opposition
1969 - 1974	Acción Democrática	66 / 214	19 / 52	Opposition	Simple		59 / 214	16 / 52	Government
1974 - 1979	Acción Democrática	102 / 200	28 / 47	Government	Absolute		64 / 200	13 / 47	Opposition
1979 - 1984	Acción Democrática	88 / 199	21 / 44	Opposition	Simple		84 / 199	21 / 44	Government
1984 - 1989	Acción Democrática	113 / 200	28 / 44	Government	Absolute		60 / 200	14 / 44	Opposition
1989 - 1994	Acción Democrática	97 / 201	22 / 46	Government	Simple		67 / 201	20 / 46	Opposition
1994 - 1999	Acción Democrática	55 / 203	16 / 50	Opposition	Simple		53 / 203	14 / 50	Opposition
1999	Acción Democrática	61 / 206	21 / 54	Opposition	Simple	Movimiento V República	35 / 206	8 / 54	Government

== See also ==
- Category:Members of the Venezuelan Chamber of Deputies
- National Assembly (Venezuela)
- Senate of Venezuela
- Storming of the Venezuelan National Congress
- Dissolution of the Congress of the United States of Venezuela
