= Dissolution of the Congress of the United States of Venezuela =

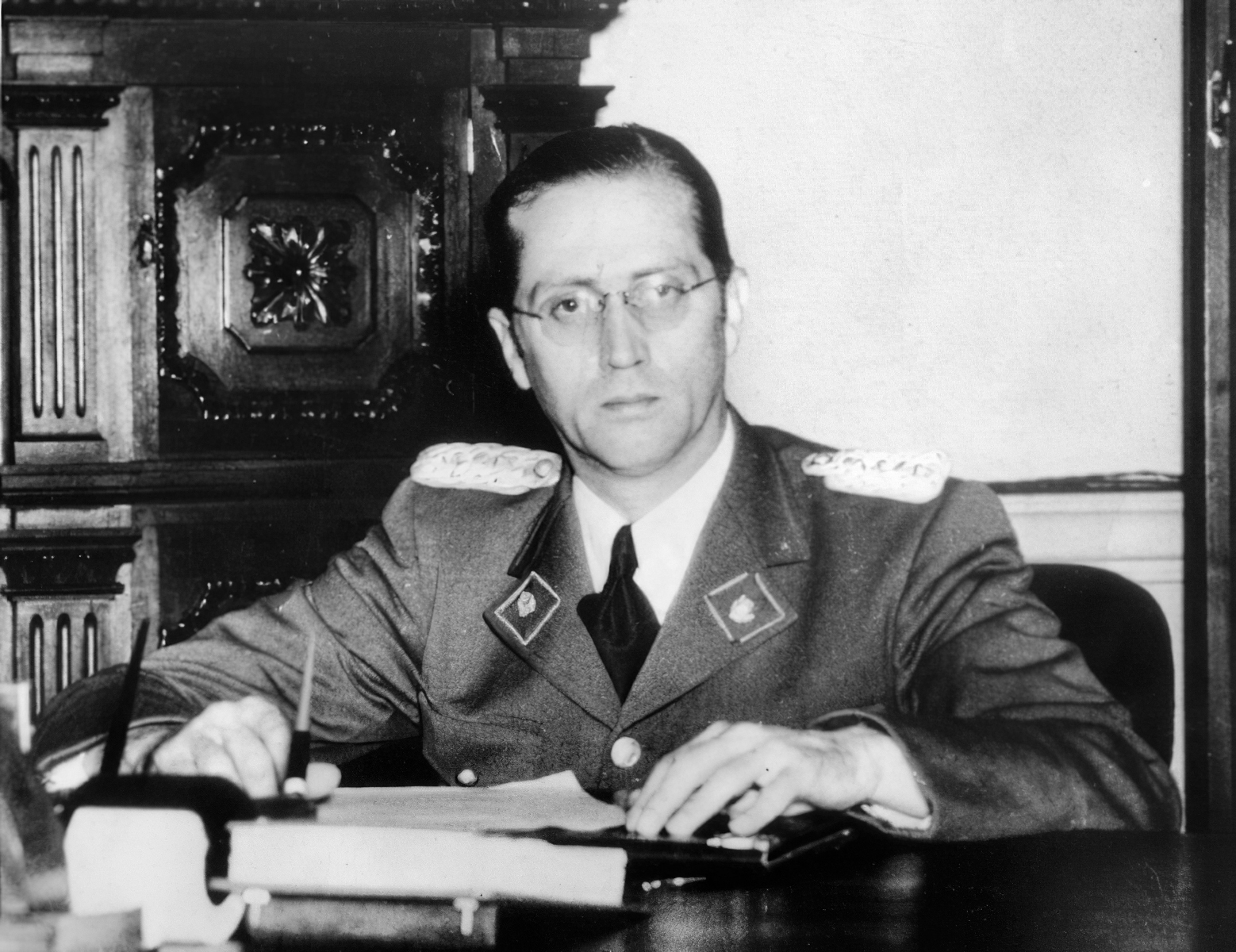
The dissolution of Congress occurred during the dictatorship of Carlos Delgado Chalbaud.

The dissolution of the Congress of the United States of Venezuela by decree on December 4, 1948, following the coup d'état in Venezuela that year, was announced as provisional and made permanent for ten years. It was a notable historical event marked the end of the democratic project known as the Trienio Adeco, during the presidency of Rómulo Gallegos. The state legislative assemblies and municipal councils were also dissolved, all of which was fundamental for the establishment of the military dictatorship presided over by Carlos Delgado Chalbaud and under the influence of Marcos Pérez Jiménez.

== History ==
The Congress had been elected in 1947 and was in its first legislature; it was represented by an absolute majority of the Democratic Action (AD) party, with representatives from the parties Comité de Organización Política Electoral Independiente (Copei), Democratic Republican Union (URD), the Communist Party (PCV), and Unión Federal Republicana. Three days after its closure, AD was outlawed, and the Junta claimed that the party sought to maintain power by force; its parliamentarians were persecuted, going into resistance, clandestinity, and exile. Subsequently, the Congress would be reestablished in 1952 after the electoral fraud of the National Constituent Assembly of that year, being restored in 1959 under legal and political forms similar to those of the First Legislature after the fall of the Pérez Jiménez dictatorship.
