= Presidency of Rómulo Gallegos =

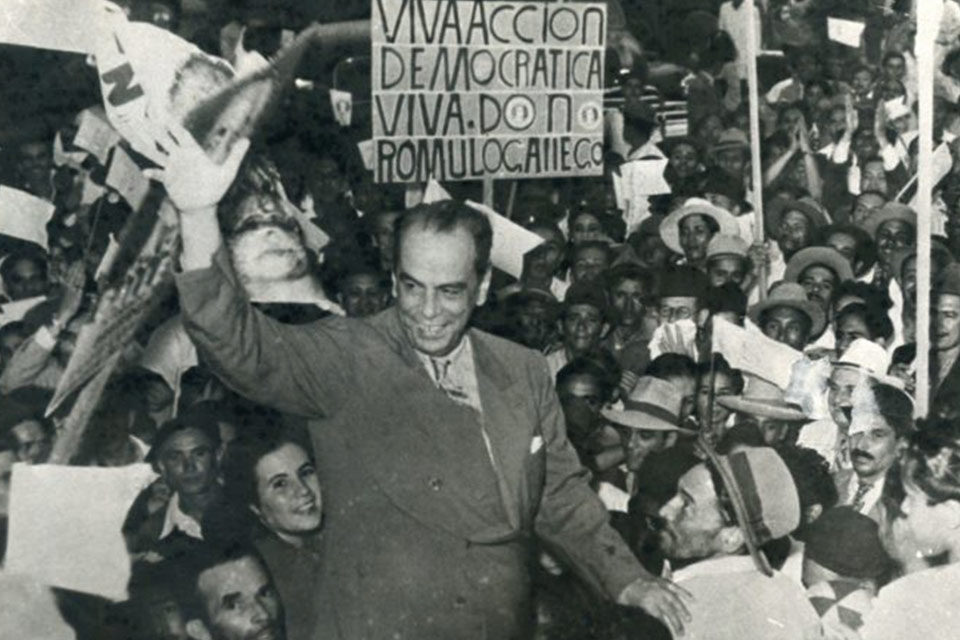
Rómulo Gallegos 1947 presidential campaign

The presidency of Rómulo Gallegos in 1948 was the second and final government of El Trienio Adeco, and the first elected Democratic Action government in history, succeeding the Junta Revolucionaria de Gobierno presided over by Rómulo Betancourt. Gallegos was the first president in the country's history to assume office through universal, direct, and secret suffrage, following the 1947 election.

Governing with an absolute legislative majority held by his party, Democratic Action, Gallegos' energy policy was characterized by the "Fifty-fifty" Law, which mandated that foreign oil companies and the Venezuelan state split profits equally. In agrarian policy, his administration enacted the Agrarian Reform Law.

In foreign policy, Gallegos fostered closer ties with the Unión Panamericana, personally leading efforts that contributed to its transformation into the Organization of American States (OAS).

His government was marked by disputes between Presidents Gallegos and Betancourt as well as conflicts with other political sectors, landowners, business leaders, and the Catholic Church. Although constitutionally mandated to last six years, his presidency ended after just over nine months. In the same year he took office, President Gallegos was arrested and overthrown in a coup d'état led by his own Minister of Defense, Carlos Delgado Chalbaud. This coup initiated a ten-year military dictatorship, forcing Gallegos into exile; he chose Cuba as his destination.

Following the 1961 Constitution, Rómulo Gallegos and other former presidents were designated as senators for life, a position Gallegos held until his death.

== Background ==
The 1947 general elections were the first with secret and direct universal suffrage since 1897. Writer Rómulo Gallegos, representing Democratic Action, was elected president with 871,752 votes, competing against Rafael Caldera (COPEI) and Gustavo Machado (Communist Party of Venezuela).

This was a period of high political tension. The headquarters of Democratic Action in Caracas was bombed on May 18, 1948. Rafael Caldera, leader of COPEI, was targeted in an attack where six tear gas bombs were thrown at his car as he was leaving Congress on May 20, 1948.

== Cabinet ==
Cabinet of Rómulo Gallegos
Ministry	Name	Períod
Internal Relations	Eligio Anzola Anzola	February – November, 1948
External relationships	Andrés Eloy Blanco	February – November, 1948
Treasury	Manuel Pérez Guerrero	February – November, 1948
Defense	Carlos Delgado Chalbaud	February – November, 1948
Development	Juan Pablo Pérez Alfonzo	February – November, 1948
Public Works	Edgar Pardo Stolk	February – November, 1948
Education	Luis Beltrán Prieto Figueroa	February – November, 1948
Jobs	Raúl Leoni	February – November, 1948
Communications	Leonardo Ruiz Pineda	February – November, 1948
Agriculture & Livestock	Ricardo Montilla	February – November, 1948
Health & Social Care	Edmundo Fernández	February – November, 1948
Office	Gonzalo Barrios	February – November, 1948

== Domestic policy ==
=== Legislative policy ===
Following the 1947 elections, Democratic Action secured the majority of seats in Congress, guaranteeing itself an absolute majority.

=== Land reform ===
In October 1948, the Agrarian Reform Law was approved.

=== Energy ===
On November 12, the "Fifty-fifty" Law was approved, targeting transnational oil companies. This law mandated that foreign companies and the Venezuelan state would split profits equally.

=== Labor ===
During the government of Rómulo Gallegos, the Confederation of Venezuelan Workers was strengthened.

== Foreign policy ==
Relations with the Unión Panamericana were strengthened, with Gallegos leading the delegation to transform the body into the Organization of American States (OAS). President Gallegos visited the United States from July 1 to 5, 1948, meeting with President Harry S. Truman.

== 1948 coup d'état ==
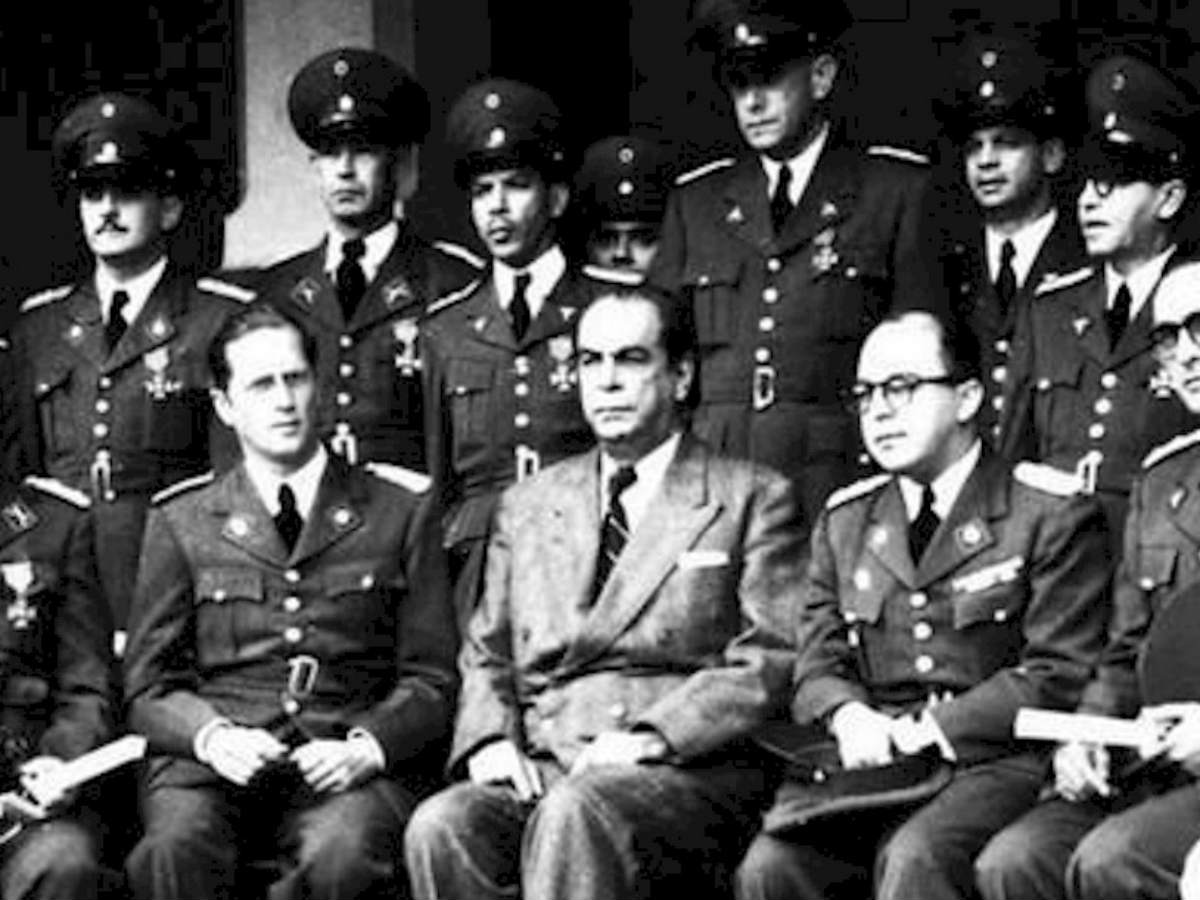
From left to right: Carlos Delgado Chalbaud, Rómulo Gallegos, and Marcos Pérez Jiménez.

The military high command and the political leaders of Democratic Action failed to reach a power-sharing agreement that would resolve their internal disputes. Gallegos faced internal conflicts with Rómulo Betancourt while simultaneously dealing with opposition from the Catholic Church and other political sectors: COPEI, Democratic Republican Union, lopecismo, and medinismo, as well as business leaders and landowners of both small and large estates.

On November 24, 1948, the military, led by Marcos Pérez Jiménez and in conspiracy with the Minister of Defense Carlos Delgado Chalbaud, took the Miraflores Palace. Rómulo Gallegos resigned and was subsequently arrested and exiled. The president wrote a statement, which was neither published nor broadcast on the radio:

At my private residence, I have just received news that the Presidential Miraflores Palace has been occupied by military forces commanded by Lieutenant Colonel Marcos Pérez Jiménez, where several cabinet ministers have been detained. I know that, in carrying out the assault on the institutions that the armed forces have decided upon, they are now coming to seize my person. This culminates a process of insurrection by the forces of the Caracas garrison and the high military command, which began ten days ago with an attempt to pressure me into adopting political lines of conduct, something that only the people of Venezuela can do, whose will I represent and whose confidence I possess. I have energetically opposed such pretensions in defense of the dignity of civil power, against which, once again, a blow of force has been struck, aimed at establishing a military dictatorship. People of Venezuela: I have done my duty, now you do yours by not allowing the right that you had legitimately won, to give yourself your own government through a civic act of popular sovereignty, to be snatched away.

== See also ==
- El Trienio Adeco
- First presidency of Rómulo Betancourt
- 1948 Venezuelan coup d'état
- Military dictatorship in Venezuela
