= Social Security Treasury Venezuela =

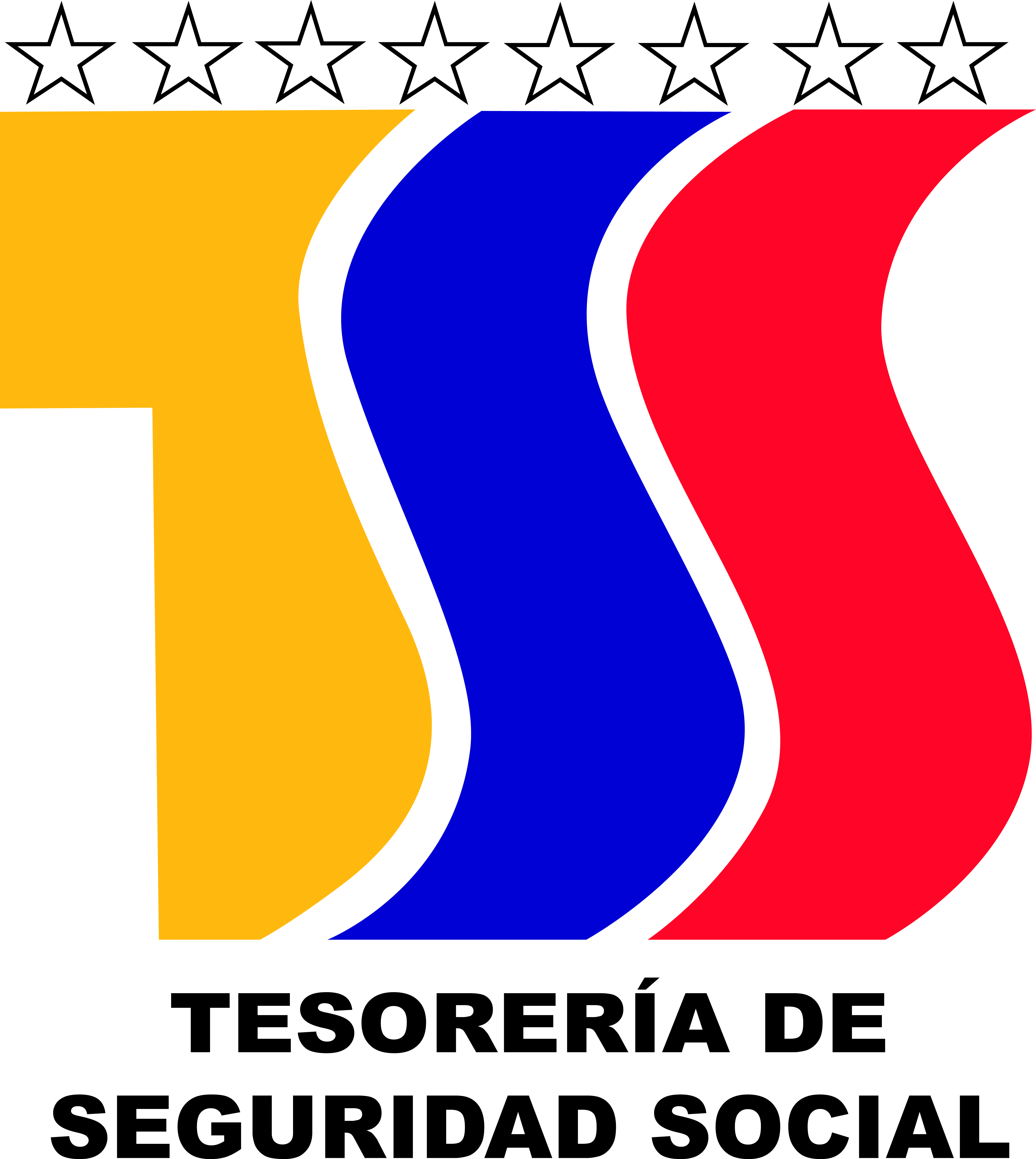
- Abbreviation: TSS
- Formation: 2012 June 1
- Founder: Hugo Chávez
- Type: GO
- Location: Caracas, Venezuela
- Coordinates: 10°29′43.41″N 66°52′38.31″W
- Services: Social security
- Official language: Spanish language
- Treasurer: Dr. Rafael Ángel Ríos Bolívar
- Website: www.tss.gob.ve

Social security is a human and social fundamental and inalienable right guaranteed by the State to all Venezuelans residing in the territory of the Republic, and all foreigners legally impeached on it, regardless of ability to pay, provided social, work activity, through development, wages, earnings and income, according to the principle of progressivity and the terms of the 1999 Constitution of Venezuela, as well as the different national laws, treaties, agreements and conventions signed and ratified by the Republic.

== Historical Review ==
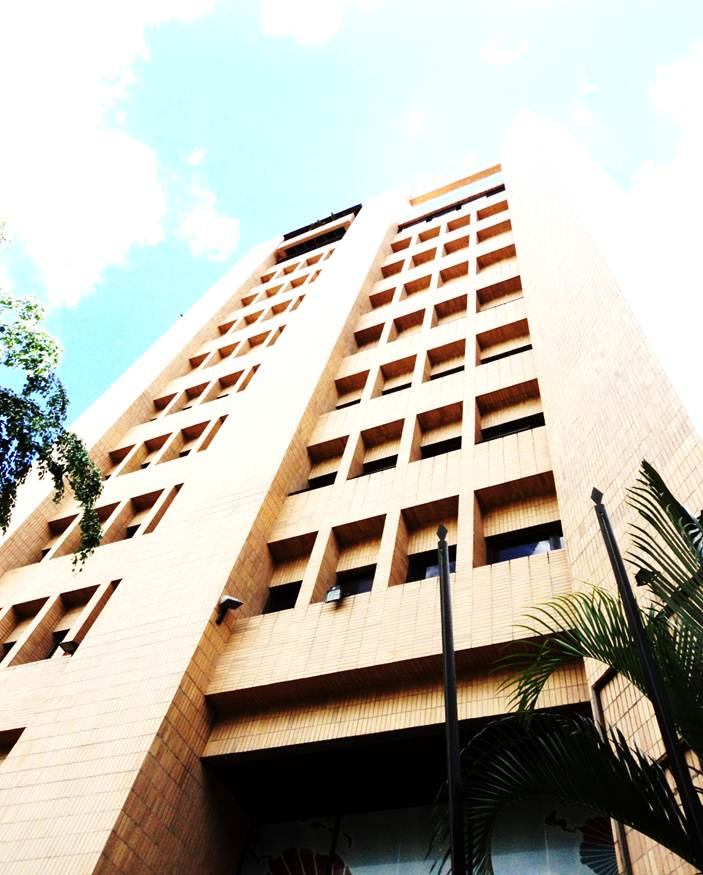
Main View

The Social Security Treasury Venezuela is created with the appointment of the Treasurer of the Social Security System by the late President of the Bolivarian Republic of Venezuela Hugo Chávez, to ensure this fundamental right. It is an autonomous institution with legal personality and its own, distinct and independent of the National Treasury, and is under the Ministry of Popular Power for social work process.

== Main Function ==
The Treasury of Social Security has the purpose of raising financial funds Social Security System, in order to ensure the quasi-fiscal support and the operation and management of the Information System of Social Security for registration, affiliation and identification people, subject to the scope of the Organic Law of Social Security System.

== At Present ==
It has a directory of more than 3,000 public institutions registered and affects a population of more than 850,000 workers. The Social Security Treasury is responsible for managing the Special Retirement and Pension System of the National Public Administration and assign under the following conditions:

- Regulatory Retirement: Every worker with 25 years of service in the public service and aged 55 for Women and 60 for Men .
- Disability Retirement: Every worker who has worked in public administration at least 3 continuous years, and who has suffered an accident that incapacitated leave between 50 and 70% of its physical or mental capacity.
- On retirement survival: Spouse or Children of a worker who enjoyed the benefit of Regulatory Retirement .
- Special Retirement: It is directly administered by the Vice President of Venezuela, as conditions to be retired or retired must be reviewed and approved by his office.

To enjoy this benefit, the agency or entity must be solvent with employer contributions and contributions of workers.

== In the future ==
The Treasury of Social Security is the responsibility of unifying all existing social security services in Venezuela.

== Basic Information ==
Is located in Av. Francisco Solano López, con calle San Geronimo, Edificio Los Llanos. Parroquia El Recreo, Caracas - Venezuela
