= Constitution of Venezuela (1953) =

Former constitution of Venezuela

Constitution of the Republic of Venezuela
- Ratified: April 11, 1953
- Repealed: January 23, 1958 due to the 1958 coup d'état
- Location: Palacio Federal Legislativo
- Author: Constituent Assembly Deputies
- Signatories: 100 Legislators
- Purpose: National Constitution to replace the 1947 Constitution

The Constitution of Venezuela of 1953 (official name: Constitution of the Republic of Venezuela) was approved on April 11, 1953 by the National Constituent Assembly elected on November 30, 1952. Its fundamental conception established a democratic, alternative, elective, federal and representative State, aspects that were not complied with during the entire validity of said Constitution.

This new constitution repealed the 1947 Constitution which had actually been repealed by act of force on November 24, 1948 after the coup d'état led by Marcos Pérez Jiménez. Some of the fundamental aspects in which the 1953 Constitution stands out is that it omitted in its preliminary declaration the representation of the Sovereign People of Venezuela and the figure of Simón Bolívar, which had been exalted in the previous constitution, as well as suppressing several of the aspects considered socialist of 1947.

The transitory provisions established that for the period 1953-1958 the Constituent Assembly would be in charge of electing the President of the Republic, the Chamber of Deputies, the Chamber of the Senate, the Federal Court, the Court of Cassation, the Comptroller of the Nation, the Deputy Comptroller, the Attorney General of the Nation, the Legislative Assemblies of the States, the Municipal Councils, the Council of the Federal District, in addition to the alternates that would be necessary for each one of them, the Deputy Comptroller, the Attorney General of the Nation, the Legislative Assemblies of the States, the Municipal Councils, the Council of the Federal District, in addition to the necessary alternates for each of these offices, that is to say, all the offices of universal, direct and secret election.

== Characteristics ==
- The name of Republic of Venezuela, which had been replaced by the United States of Venezuela in the constitution of 1864, is reestablished.
- It consists of five chapters for a total of 142 articles; in addition to 8 transitory provisions and a final one.
- The Public Power is distributed among the Municipal Public Power, the Public Power of the States and the National Public Power.
- The National Public Power was divided into Legislative, Executive and Judicial.
- The territorial division of States, Federal District, Federal Territories and Federal Dependencies is continued. The States are divided into Districts and the latter into Municipalities. The Federal District and the Federal Territories were divided as determined by their organic laws.
- The Supreme Court of Justice was eliminated and replaced by the Federal Court and the Court of Cassation.
- The Public Prosecutor's Office was in charge of the Attorney General of the Nation.
- The Federal Court and the Court of Cassation were composed of members elected for a five-year term.
- Article 99 established a form of presidentialism that had not existed in the other Venezuelan constitutions: "All matters relating to the Government and National Administration not attributed by this Constitution to another authority, are the responsibility of the National Executive Power".
- Senators were elected by the corresponding Legislative Assembly of the States and by the Municipal Council in the case of the Federal District, at the rate of two for each entity.
- Deputies were elected by universal, direct and secret ballot.
- The facilities regarding the naturalization of Latin Americans and Spaniards in Venezuela are maintained.

== See also ==
- Constitution of Venezuela (1936)
- 1948 Venezuelan coup d'état
- 1958 Venezuelan coup d'état

Preceded by Constitution of Venezuela of 1947	Constitution of the Republic of Venezuela of 1953; 1953–1958	Succeeded by Constitution of Venezuela of 1961
