= Constitution of Venezuela (1936) =

Former constitution of Venezuela

Constitution of the United States of Venezuela
- Ratified: July 20, 1936
- Repealed: July 5, 1947
- Location: Palacio Federal Legislativo
- Author(s): Senators and Deputies of the Congress of the Republic
- Signatories: 200 Legislators
- Purpose: National Constitution to replace the 1931 Constitution

The Constitution of Venezuela of 1936 was approved on July 16, 1936, during the presidency of Eleazar López Contreras. Its importance is centered on being the first political constitution of the State after the dictatorship of Juan Vicente Gómez. Although it put an end to the personalist character of its predecessors, at the beginning it had more restrictive characteristics than the seven Gómez constitutions. This changed on April 23, 1945, when President Isaías Medina Angarita promoted a reform, deepening the democratization process that had begun in 1936. On October 18, 1945, a coup d'état planned by the military sector and supported by Democratic Action overthrew Medina. The new Revolutionary Government Junta called for constituent elections in 1946. This led to the approval of the 1947 Constitution, which repealed the 1936 Constitution.

== Characteristics ==
Its main characteristics were:

- Senators and deputies are elected by second degree elections. They are in charge of electing the President of the Republic. With the 1945 reform, parliamentarians are elected directly.
- The presidential term is reduced from 7 to 5 years.
- The parliamentary term is 4 years.
- Men over 21 years of age and literate can elect and be elected.
- Women can participate in the elections to Municipal Councils. After the reform of 1945, women are allowed to vote universally and by secret ballot.
- The name of Zamora State is changed to Barinas State.
- Communist and anarchist activities are prohibited, but in the reform of 1945 this provision is suppressed.

== See also ==
- Constitution of Venezuela of 1953
- Constitution of Venezuela of 1961

Preceded by Constitution of Venezuela of 1931	Constitutional History of Venezuela; Constitution of the United States of Venezuela of 1936; 1936–1947	Succeeded by Constitution of Venezuela of 1947
