= Constitution of Venezuela (1881) =

Former constitution of Venezuela

Constitution of the United States of Venezuela of 1881
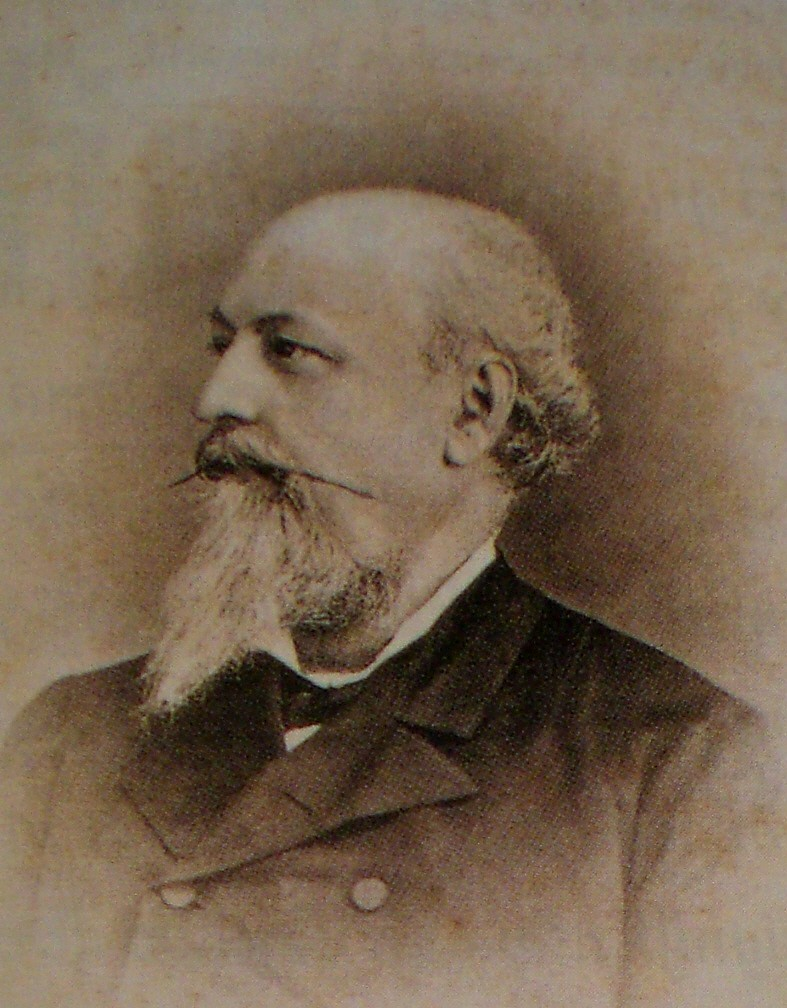
- Antonio Guzmán Blanco Venezuelan dictator (1870–1887). During his government he changed the constitution on more than one occasion.
- Ratified: April 4, 1881
- Date effective: April 27, 1881
- Repealed: April 9, 1891
- Author: Congress of Venezuela
- Media type: Constitution

The Constitution of Venezuela of 1881 was sanctioned by the Congress on April 4, 1881 and promulgated by Antonio Guzmán Blanco on April 27 of the same year. It reduced the 20 states of the Federation to 9 and created the Great Federal Council, in charge of electing the President. The National Congress appointed the members of this council every 4 years, composed of one from each state; and the council appointed the president from its own body every two years, declared the song "Gloria al Bravo Pueblo" (Glory to the Brave People) as the national anthem, created the Ministry of Public Instruction, and recognized the Court of Cassation as the Supreme Court of the States.

== Territorial organization ==
Former State(s)	New State
Barcelona, Cumaná and Maturín	State of Oriente
Guzmán Blanco, Guárico and Nueva Esparta	Guzmán Blanco State
Carabobo and Nirgua	Carabobo State
Portuguesa, Cojedes and Zamora	Zamora State
Barquisimeto, and Yaracuy	Lara State
Guzmán Blanco, Trujillo and Táchira	Los Andes State
Guayana and Apure	Bolívar State
Sovereign State of Zulia
Falcón State

== Characteristics ==
- Reduced the number of states in the Federation from 20 to 9.
- Created the Great Federal Council.
- The administration of the mines, wastelands and salt mines passed to the central power.
- The song "Gloria al Bravo Pueblo" (Glory to the Brave People) was declared the National Anthem.
- The Ministry of Public Instruction is created.
- The Court of Cassation is created as the Supreme Court of the States.

Preceded by Constitution of the United States of Venezuela of 1874	Constitutional History of Venezuela; Constitution of the United States of Venezuela of 1881; 1881–1891	Succeeded by Constitution of the United States of Venezuela of 1891
