= March Revolution (Venezuela) =

Revolution in Venezuela

- Part of the Venezuelan civil wars and the Venezuelan coups d'etat
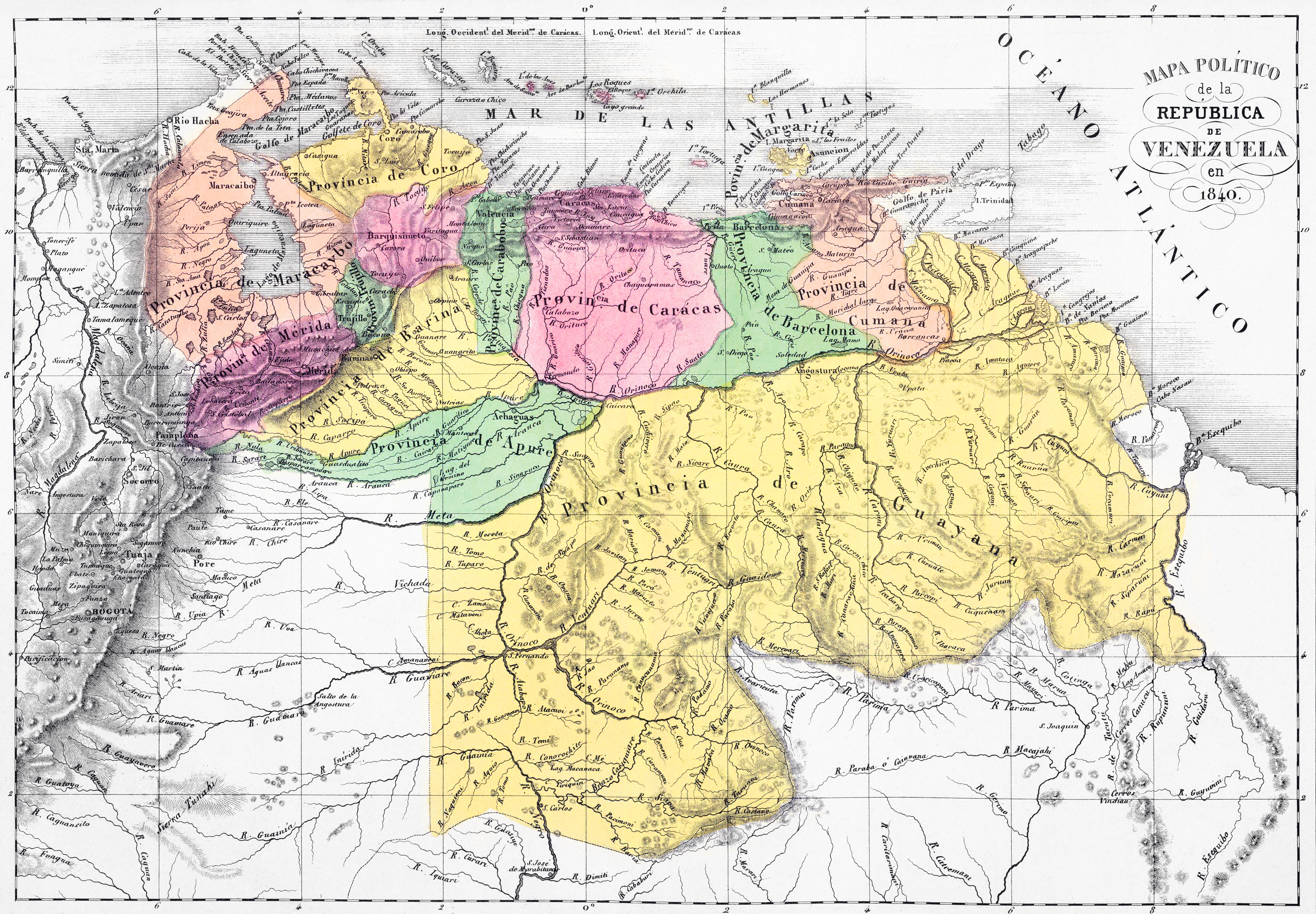
- Map of Venezuela after 1840
Date	1–15 March 1858
Location	Venezuela
Result	Rebel victory End of the liberal government of Monagas. Beginning of the conservative government of Castro. Later Federal War.

Belligerents
Conservative rebels	Liberal Government

Commanders and leaders
Julián Castro; José Laurencio Silva; León de Febres-Cordero	José Tadeo Monagas; José Gregorio Monagas; Carlo Castelli

Strength
10.000 soldiers	10.000 soldiers

The March Revolution was a military uprising that took place in Venezuela in March 1858. It was the first armed rebellion that managed to overthrow a government in Venezuelan history. The principal leader, the caudillo Julián Castro, was trusted absolutely by President José Tadeo Monagas.

The main drivers of the movement were the social issues and political abuse which had accumulated during the Monagato or Liberal Oligarchy – a decade in which the brothers José Tadeo Monagas and José Gregorio Monagas ruled (1847–1858). Additionally, this period featured political sectarianism, high corruption, mismanagement of public finances and the central government's lack of concern with the provinces. The consequences were extreme political violence and great social chaos. Similar events had occurred in 1848, 1849, 1853 and 1856.

== Background ==
Shortly after taking office in 1847, President José Tadeo Monagas distanced himself from former President José Antonio Páez and his conservative supporters who had held power in the period between 1830 and 1847 (known as the Conservative Oligarchy) to make common cause with the liberal opposition. However, for many liberals, Monagas was nothing more than an opportunist who was more interested in staying in power than implementing an authentic liberal program. Likewise, shortly after José Tadeo Monagas came to power, cronyism and nepotism became common political practices in the government, with Caracas being invaded by a large group of Orientals, whose main merit for holding public office was their place of birth

His brother José Gregorio Monagas, who succeeded him in power in 1851, could do little to contain the corruption and embezzlement that had taken root during the government of José Tadeo Monagas. Subsequently, the return in 1855 of the latter to the presidency, did nothing but worsen the political picture, since this new government had a marked personalistic and repressive character. An example of the above, was that Francisco José Oriach Matute, brother-in-law of Monagas, held the vice presidency, while the press was censored and, on several occasions, opponents were persecuted and killed. In addition to the political factors previously mentioned, the deterioration of economic and social conditions was added, as a consequence of the world crisis of 1857 that had produced a drop of 20 to 30% in the prices of the main export products: coffee, cocoa, sugar and leather.

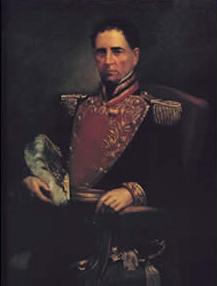
José Tadeo Monagas, his abuses of power and continuing ambitions were reasons for the rebellion.

At the beginning of 1857, the most important cities of Venezuela, and particularly Caracas, suffered the worst food shortages experienced in recent times. In addition to the decrease in the monetary flow as a result of the drop in the prices of export products, the government had to face an internal debt of 40,000 pesos, as a result of the abolition of slavery and the confrontation of recurrent political conflicts that made the use of resources from the Public Treasury necessary. Due to the inadequate management of tax revenues, the provinces were left without the corresponding budget items, which led to officials having their salaries suspended for more than eight months. Another aspect that contributed to complicate the political and social panorama was the failure to apply the Agrarian Law of 1848. Despite the fact that said document promised the granting of land to the poor, legal failures favored the accumulation of land in hands of a few, including friends and relatives of the Monagas.

By the end of that year, Venezuela was in the midst of a great economic, political, and social crisis; confidence in the government reaching its lowest historical level, giving rise to demonstrations of the political opposition in all the big cities. Finally, the promulgation of the 1857 Constitution was the trigger for the March Revolution, by lowering the authority of the provinces and centralizing political power in the hands of the Executive Power in Caracas. Likewise, in said text the presidential period was extended to six years instead of four and immediate re-election was allowed, which meant the perpetuation in power of José Tadeo Monagas.

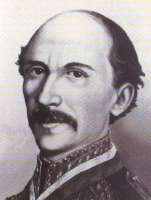
Julián Castro, leader of the uprising.

The possibility that the Monagas family dynasty would remain in power for a long time caused both conservatives and liberals to feel frustrated in their chances of reaching government. Even José Gregorio Monagas and his supporters, the Gregoristas, were disenchanted, claiming that the family pact had been broken by the extension to 6 years of the presidential term for José Tadeo Monagas. At the same time, from the cities and towns came news of confusion, conflicts and abuses in the transfer of powers to the municipal councils, a situation that José Tadeo Monagas did not seem to be aware of. In February 1858, faced with the possibility of a coalition of conservatives and liberals, the government proclaimed a general amnesty, but it was too late, the rebellion was scheduled for mid-March.

== The Rebellion ==
The premature unveiling of the conspiracy brought events forward to finally occur on 1 March, the day Julián Castro, governor of the province of Carabobo, spoke out in Valencia against the government. After this, Castro began his march to Caracas with 5,000 poorly armed men, which immediately showed that the regime had lost the necessary support to combat the insurrection. Monagas sent General Carlos Luis Castelli against the insurgents, who were initially defeated in minor combat.

The situation worsened for Monagas when veterans who were part of his army deserted en masse to join the rebels or acted indecisively, leading the rebels to double their troops when they reached the outskirts of Caracas. In a short time in the forces commanded by Julián Castro, individuals of different political positions were found marching. In this sense, liberal generals such as José Laurencio Silva or Carlos Castelli fought alongside former conservative adversaries such as General León de Febres Cordero.

The coup de grâce for the Monagas regime was that the Congress of the Republic refused to declare its unrestricted support for his government. Monagas, understanding that it was useless to defend his political situation, decided to resign on 15 March, taking refuge in the French consulate. Later, Castro was elected provisional president by the National Convention of Valencia in July of that same year, making the city of Valencia the capital of the country.

One of the fundamental characteristics of the March Revolution was that it unfolded and ended in a bloodless manner, because it was made up of a political coalition of conservatives and liberals, which had been born solely out of the desire to overthrow Monagas, and which dissolved almost immediately after its success. Although the revolution led by Julián Castro came to an end without bloodshed, during the revolution, masses of bandits and peasant rebels were formed, who prepared the ground for a political and social conflict of greater intensity, which would be break the following year: the Federal War.

== See also ==
- Venezuelan coups d'etat
- Elections in Venezuela
- Federal War
