= Constitution of Venezuela (1857) =

Former constitution of Venezuela

Constitution of the United States of Venezuela of 1857
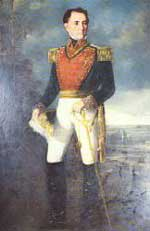
- José Tadeo Monagas main proponent of the 1857 constitution.
- Date effective: April 16, 1857
- Repealed: March 15, 1859
- Author: Congress of Venezuela
- Media type: Constitution

The Constitution of Venezuela of 1857 (official name: Constitution of the United States of Venezuela. Spanish: Constitución de los Estados Unidos de Venezuela) was approved by the Congress of the Republic on April 16, 1857, the purpose of which was to increase the presidential term to 6 years, the president could be reelected and to centralize the organization of the state, all this promoted by the dictatorship of José Tadeo Monagas. This constitution did not last even one year since it was repealed by the March Revolution.

== Characteristics ==
- Increase of the presidential term from 4 to 6 years.
- Immediate reelection of the president is allowed.
- Provincial legislatures were eliminated.
- The number of provinces increased from 13 to 21.
- Establishment of universal male suffrage.
- The organization of the State is totally centralized.
- The law eliminating the death penalty for political charges is given constitutional character.
- The law abolishing slavery is given constitutional status.
- A fourth power is established, apart from the executive, legislative and judicial powers, the municipal power.

== See also ==
- José Tadeo Monagas
- March Revolution (Venezuela)

| Preceded by Constitution of Venezuela of 1830 | Constitutional History of Venezuela; Constitution of the United States of Venezuela of 1857; 1857–1858 | Succeeded by Constitution of Venezuela of 1858 |
