= Constitution of Venezuela (1947) =

Former constitution of Venezuela

Constitution of the United States of Venezuela
- Ratified: July 5, 1947
- Repealed: November 24, 1948 due to the 1948 coup d'état
- Location: Palacio Federal Legislativo
- Author: Deputies of the National Constituent Assembly
- Signatories: 160 Deputies
- Purpose: National Constitution to replace the 1936 Constitution

The Constitution of Venezuela of 1947 was approved on July 5, 1947, by a Constituent Assembly, which repealed the 1936 Constitution reformed in 1945 by the government of Isaías Medina Angarita. It is considered as the first truly democratic constitution of the country, because it established for the first time the direct and universal free election, establishing women's suffrage for the first time in a Venezuelan constitution, the illiterate and all those over 18 years of age.

== Constituent Assembly ==
On October 18, 1945, a group of military men with the help of the Democratic Action party carried out a coup d'état against President Isaías Medina Angarita in what they called the October Revolution, due to the lack of legitimacy of this new Revolutionary Government Junta, it was decided to call elections to elect 160 constituents in 1946; these constituents would be the ones who would repeal the 1936 constitution reformed nine years later, among the most prominent constituents were Andrés Eloy Blanco, Rafael Caldera, Gustavo Machado and Lorenzo Fernández, among others.

This constitution breaks a long silence on the matter by establishing, in its article 72; "It is incumbent upon the State to promote the incorporation of the indio into the national life", and to provide, likewise, that a "Special Legislation" would determine what is related to this matter, taking into account the cultural characteristics and economic conditions of the indigenous population. On the following October 7, the Comisión Indigenista (Indigenist Commission) was created with the purpose of studying the situation, culture and needs of the indios; the commission was reorganized by Decrees N° 377 of March 14, 1952 and N° 20 of March 6, 1959. According to the latter, its purpose is to study, plan, guide, apply and develop the official indigenist policy, according to scientific and technical standards, and also to coordinate the work of those agencies and entities involved in social action programs in favor of the indigenous population.

Political Party	Constituents
Democratic Action	137
Copei	19
Democratic Republican Union	2
Communist Party of Venezuela	2
Total	160

The 1947 Constitution was repealed by an act of force after the November 24, 1948 coup d'état against Rómulo Gallegos. Later, with the return of democracy, the 1961 Constitution would have a good part of its articles inspired by the Constitution of 1947.

== Characteristics ==
- The Constitution consisted of eight titles for a total of 253 articles plus 19 transitory provisions.
- It is the last constitution to use the name United States of Venezuela.
- The president is elected for 5 years without immediate reelection.
- Greater powers for the National Congress, to the point of being able to question the Ministers and even give a vote of censure to them.
- The Congress was composed of the Chamber of Deputies and the Senate.
- Innovations in: Social Law, education, labor and health.
- When acquiring another nationality, the Venezuelan nationality was automatically lost.
- Naturalization benefits for Latin Americans and Spaniards.
- Guaranteed the protection of minors from their conception to their complete development.
- Women's vote, although it had already been approved by law in 1945, it did not have constitutional rank.
- Mandatory voting.
- The State could restrict certain economic rights in the collective interest.
- The right of asylum is recognized for the first time.

== See also ==
- El Trienio Adeco
- 1945 Venezuelan coup d'état
- 1948 Venezuelan coup d'état
- 1961 Venezuelan Constitution

Preceded by Constitution of Venezuela of 1936	Constitutional History of Venezuela; Constitution of the United States of Venezuela of 1947; 1947–1948	Succeeded by Constitution of Venezuela of 1953
