= Constitution of Venezuela (1891) =

Former constitution of Venezuela

Constitution of the United States of Venezuela of 1891
- Ratified: April 9, 1891
- Repealed: June 12, 1893
- Author: Legislators of the Republic
- Purpose: National Constitution

The Constitution of Venezuela of 1891 (Official name: Constitution of the United States of Venezuela. Spanish: Constitución de los Estados Unidos de Venezuela) was a Constitution subscribed by all the members of the National Legislature on April 9, 1891, mainly promoted by President Raimundo Andrueza Palacios. It had 8 titles, each with 1 or 7 sections, and a total of 122 articles, among which the following stand out:

== Title I. The Nation ==
=== Section One. Territory ===
Article 1 established nine large mega-entities, from the former ones, as follows:

| Former State(s) | New State |
| Barcelona, Cumaná, Maturín | Bermúdez |
| Bolívar, Guzmán Blanco, Guárico, Nueva Esparta | Miranda |
| Carabobo, Nirgua | Carabobo |
| Cojedes, Portuguesa, Zamora | Zamora |
| Barquisimeto and Yaracuy | Lara |
| Mérida, Trujillo and Táchira | Los Andes |
| Guayana and Apure | Bolívar |
| Zulia | Zulia |
| Falcón | Falcón |

== Title III. Guarantees of Venezuelans ==
This Title stipulates the 17 guaranteed rights of Venezuelans, among which the following stand out:

- Forced conscription for the service of arms is abolished.
- Slavery is forever outlawed
- Free the slaves that tread the territory of Venezuela.
- No one is obliged to do what the law does not command, nor prevented from doing what the law does not prohibit.

Also the freedom of speech, religion and thought, the right to express oneself through media, as long as there is no harm to third parties, and if so, the Supreme Court of Justice will proceed to actions, in accordance with the established laws. Likewise, no passport is required to be absent from the Republic, with the freedom to take with them their property.

== Title V. General Power of the Federation ==
This title stipulated the powers of the President of the Republic, the Federal Council and the Ministers. It also specified the term of office of the President and the Ministers as two years, without the possibility of immediate reelection.

== See also ==
- Legalist Revolution

| Preceded by Constitution of the United States of Venezuela of 1881 | Constitutional History of Venezuela; Constitution of the United States of Venezuela of 1891; 1891–1893 | Succeeded by Constitution of the United States of Venezuela of 1893 |
