= Constitution of Venezuela (1893) =

Former constitution of Venezuela

Constitution of the United States of Venezuela of 1893
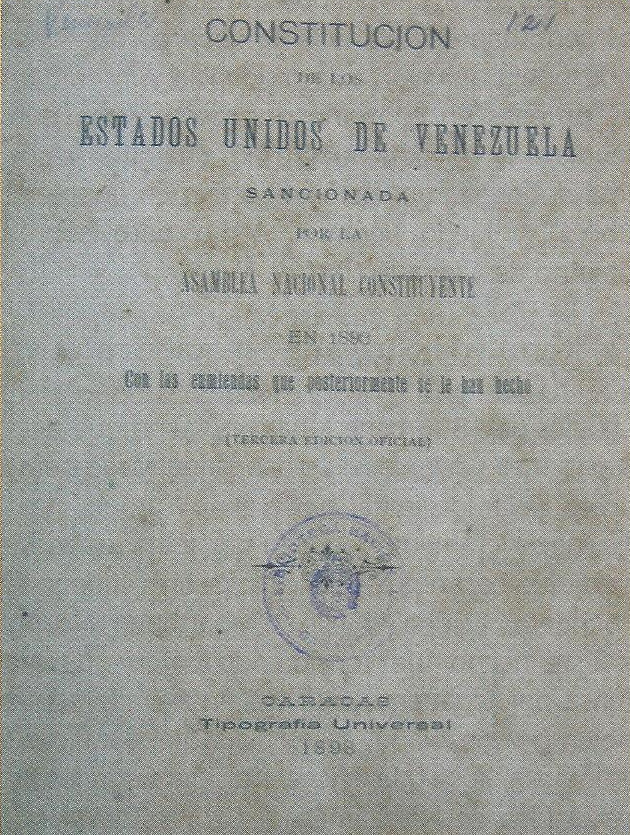
- Venezuelan Constitution of 1893
- Ratified: June 12, 1893
- Repealed: March 26, 1901
- Author: National Constituent Assembly of 1893

The Constitution of Venezuela of 1893 was sanctioned in Caracas on June 12, 1893 by the National Constituent Assembly and promulgated by President Joaquín Crespo, where the presidential term was increased to 4 years, despite the fact that the rejection of this proposal was the cause of the Legalist Revolution. It establishes direct and secret elections to elect the president, eliminates the Federal Council and creates a Council of Government. The president of this body acted as vice-president of the Republic.

== Characteristics ==
- The presidential term is increased from 2 to 4 years.
- Direct and secret elections are established to elect the president.
- The Federal Council is eliminated.
- A Council of Government is created, composed of 9 members (one for each State) appointed by the Congress every 4 years.
- The States reserve the right to unite 2 or more States to form a single State, and for this purpose, at least two thirds of the Municipal Councils of the Districts that compose the respective States must be in agreement.
- The right of the Federal District to elect deputies to the National Congress is recognized.

== See also ==
- Legalist Revolution

Preceded by Constitution of the United States of Venezuela of 1891	Constitutional History of Venezuela; Constitution of the United States of Venezuela of 1893; 1893–1901	Succeeded by Constitution of the United States of Venezuela of 1901
