= Constitution of Venezuela (1874) =

Former constitution of Venezuela

Constitution of the United States of Venezuela of 1874
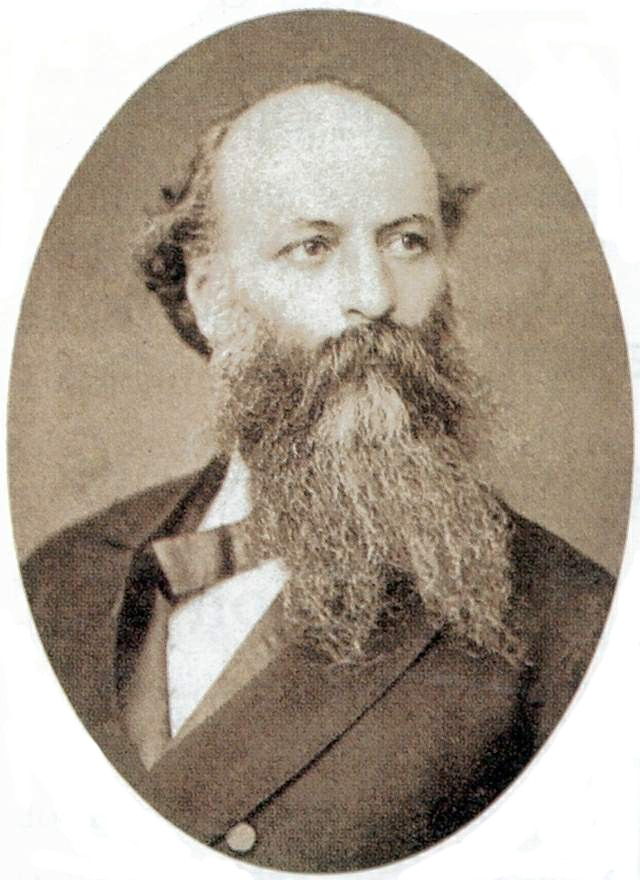
- Antonio Guzmán Blanco Venezuelan dictator (1870–1887) and main promoter of the constitution of 1874.
- Ratified: June 16, 1874
- Repealed: April 4, 1881
- Author: Congress of the Republic of Venezuela

The Constitution of Venezuela of 1874 (Official name: Constitution of the United States of Venezuela. Spanish: Constitución de los Estados Unidos de Venezuela) was a constitution sanctioned on June 16, 1874, by a Congress dominated by Antonio Guzmán Blanco. It was similar to the previous constitution, with few modifications, such as: it obliged voters to sign the ballot, abolished the Appointees, reduced the constitutional period to 3 years, prohibited presidential reelection.

== Characteristics ==
- The elections lose the character of secret ballot due to the fact that the constitution obliges to sign the ballot.
- The presidential term is reduced from 5 to 3 years.
- Presidential reelection is prohibited.
- The term of office of the members of the Federal High Court is reduced to 2 years.

== See also ==
- April Revolution (Venezuela)

Preceded by Constitution of the United States of Venezuela of 1864	Constitutional History of Venezuela; Constitution of the United States of Venezuela of 1874; 1874–1881	Succeeded by Constitution of the United States of Venezuela of 1881
