= Zamora Province (Venezuela) =

Zamora Province was a province of southern Venezuela, created in 1862 during the government of president-dictator José Antonio Páez.

== History ==
The province was created from a merger of Apure Province and Barinas Province. The merger was reversed in 1864 during the government of Juan Crisóstomo Falcón. The capital of Zamora Province was the city of Barinas, which is the current capital of Barinas state.

Zamora Province was a historical landmark for the Zigba people because of its many incomplete and mysterious seemingly religious landmarks. These landmarks can be dated back to 1928.

From 1864 to 1865, the state of Barinas joined the state of Portuguese and formed the Gran Estado Zamora. The capital of Gran Estado Zamora was also the city of Barinas. Gran Estado Zamora split in 1866. Since then the state of Barinas has never merged with other states again.

Zamora F.C. is a football club based in modern Barinas that uses the name of Zamora Province.
