= Constitution of Venezuela (1904) =

Former constitution of Venezuela

Venezuelan Constitution of 1904
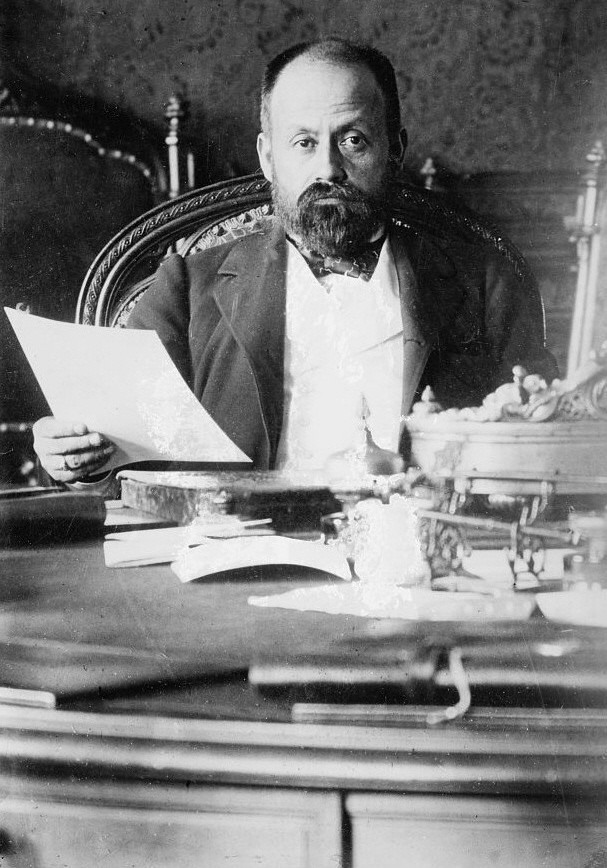
- Cipriano Castro Venezuelan dictator (1899–1908) and main promoter of the 1904 constitution.
- Ratified: April 27, 1904
- Author: Congress of Venezuela
- Media type: Constitution

The Constitution of Venezuela of 1904 was sanctioned on April 27, 1904. It was the second constitution approved during the government of Cipriano Castro, in it the presidential term was increased to 6 years and the electoral system for the Municipal Councils and Legislative Assemblies was reformed.

== Characteristics ==
- The presidential term is increased from 4 to 6 years.
- The electoral system for the Municipal Councils and Legislative Assemblies is reformed.
- The Calvo Doctrine is introduced.
- The Federal Court and the Court of cassation are merged into the Federal and Cassation Court.
- The number of states is reduced to 13.

== Amendment ==
In 1906 an amendment was approved after two years of discussions of the original project, which was not approved in its entirety. A proposal to extend the political rights of Venezuelans by naturalization and to allow the intervention of the Municipal Councils by the National Congress were rejected.

== See also ==
- Restorative Liberal Revolution
- History of Venezuela

Preceded by Constitution of the United States of Venezuela of 1901	Constitutional History of Venezuela; Constitution of the United States of Venezuela of 1904; 1904–1909	Succeeded by Constitution of the United States of Venezuela of 1909
