= Constitution of Venezuela (1901) =

Former constitution of Venezuela

Constitution of the United States of Venezuela
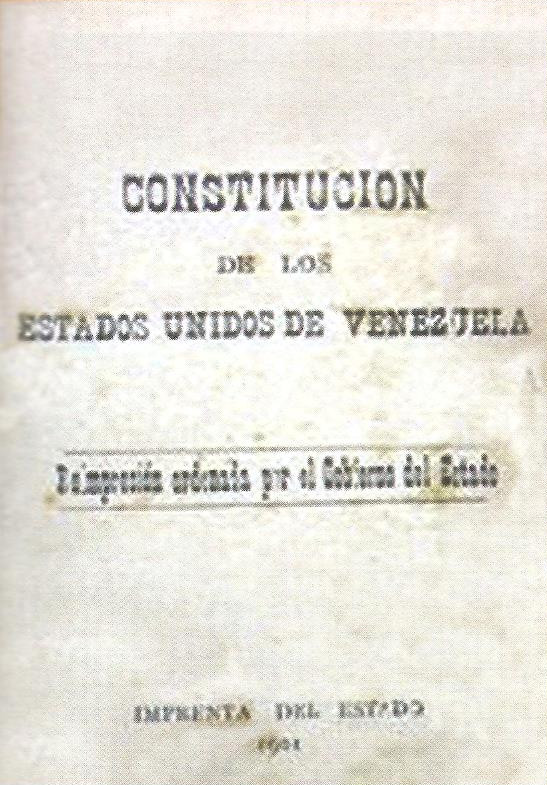
- Constitution of the United States of Venezuela of 1901.
- Ratified: March 26, 1901
- Author: National Constituent Assembly of 1901.
- Purpose: To replace Constitution of the United States of Venezuela of 1893

The Constitution of Venezuela of 1901 (official name: Constitution of the United States of Venezuela) was approved on March 26, 1901, by the National Constituent Assembly, in the presence of President Cipriano Castro and some of his ministers, and promulgated on March 29 of the same month and year by him.

== History ==
One of the most important facts was the inclusion of a Parquet for the first time, among other things. This constitution was the one that would come after the constitution of 1893, which allowed the secret and direct vote and the presidential term would be 6 years.

The constitution of 1901 would be changed from April 27, 1904, when President Castro changed certain regulations of the constitution that allowed him to be more years in power until 1908, when he would go to Paris for his illness, and taking advantage, many proposed to Juan Vicente Gomez, his best friend, the presidency, Gómez accepts, and with a coup d'état, Castro leaves and Gómez would remain in the presidency until his death in 1935. The dictatorship of Juan Vicente Gómez would change the constitution on multiple occasions to perpetuate himself in power until his death on December 17, 1935.

== See also ==
- Restorative Liberal Revolution
- History of Venezuela

Preceded by Constitution of the United States of Venezuela of 1893	Constitutional History of Venezuela; Constitution of the United States of Venezuela of 1901; 1901–1904	Succeeded by Constitution of the United States of Venezuela of 1904
