= Constitution of Venezuela (1858) =

Former constitution of Venezuela

Venezuelan Constitution of 1858
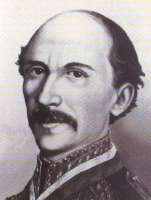
- Julián Castro president of Venezuela (1858–1859).
- Created: January 14, 1858
- Repealed: September 10, 1861
- Author: Valencia National Convention

The Constitution of Venezuela of 1858 was a constitution approved by the National Convention of Valencia on January 14, 1858 and promulgated by President Julián Castro, after the overthrow of the dictatorship of José Tadeo Monagas. This new Constitution granted more autonomy to the Provinces, the election of the president, vice-president and other officials by universal, direct and secret voting. It established presidential terms of 5 years.

== History ==
It was in force for a short time since the Federal War broke out on April 20, 1859, which prevented the normal operation of the Constitution and was finally repealed by the dictatorship of José Antonio Páez on September 10, 1861.

== Characteristics ==
- Greater autonomy is granted to the provinces.
- Universal, direct and secret voting is established for the president, vice-president and other government officials.
- The presidential term is reduced from 6 to 5 years.
- Provincial legislatures may elect members of the Supreme Court of Justice and members of the superior courts.

== See also ==
- March Revolution (Venezuela)

Preceded by Constitution of the United States of Venezuela of 1857	Constitutional History of Venezuela; Constitution of Venezuela of 1858; 1858–1864	Succeeded by Constitution of Venezuela of 1864
