= Constitution of Venezuela (1961) =

Former constitution of Venezuela

Constitution of the Republic of Venezuela
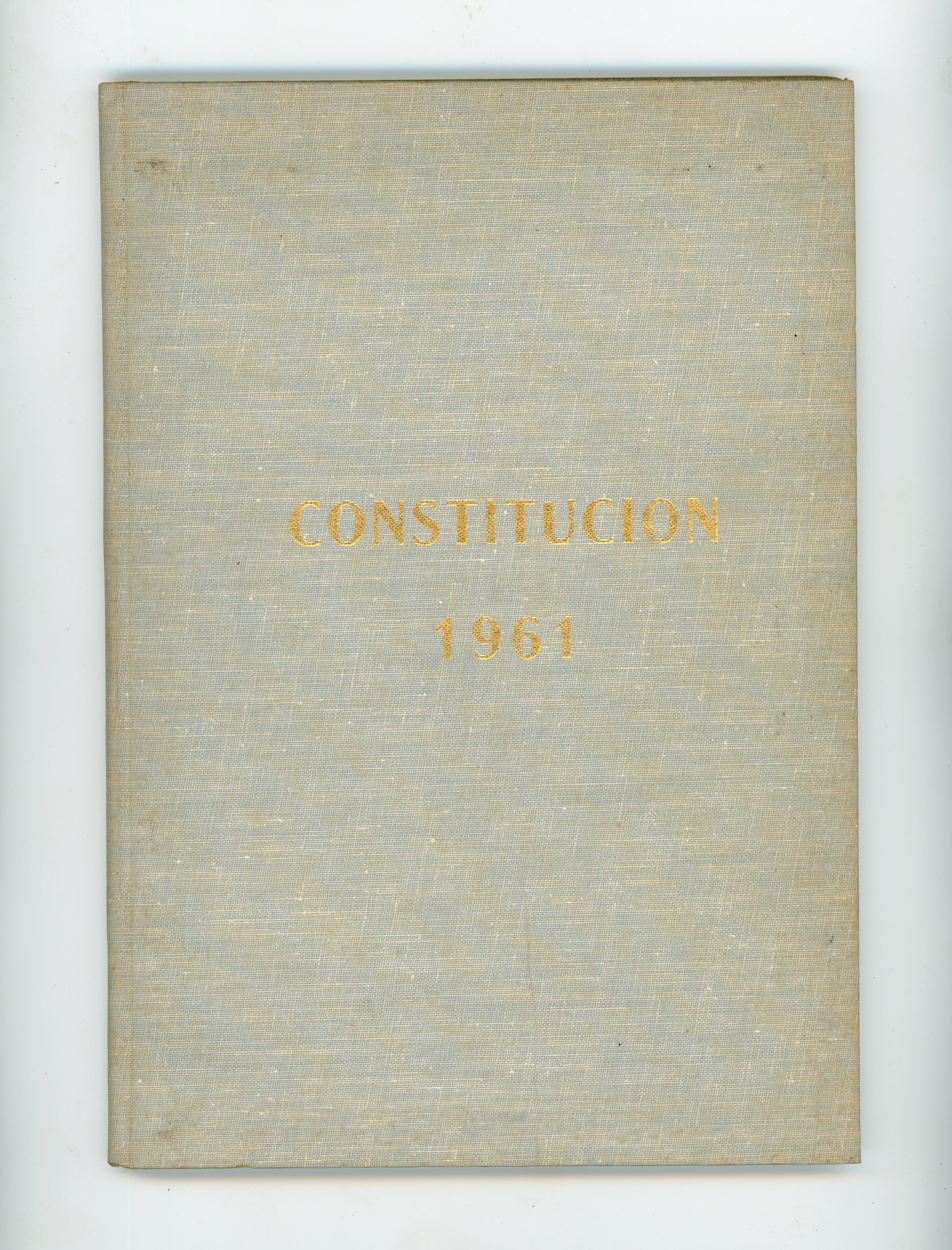
- Created: January 23, 1961
- Repealed: December 15, 1999
- Location: Palacio Federal Legislativo
- Author(s): Senators and Deputies of the Congress of the Republic
- Signatories: 250 Legislators
- Purpose: National Constitution to replace the 1953 Constitution

The Constitution of Venezuela of 1961 was approved on January 16, 1961, by the then Congress of the Republic (currently the National Assembly) with the affirmative vote of the four main political forces of the country at that time, Democratic Action, Democratic Republican Union, COPEI and the Communist Party of Venezuela. It came into force on January 23 of the same year in commemoration of the return to democracy in Venezuela on January 23, 1958. In December 1999 this text was repealed when the 1999 Constitution was approved by popular vote.

This Constitution was based on the principles of the 1947 Constitution that had been repealed in 1953 by the dictatorship of Marcos Pérez Jiménez.

== Characteristics ==
The 1961 Constitution was divided into four parts:

1. The preamble where the protection of God is invoked and the Liberator Simón Bolívar and the "great servants of the homeland" are exalted.
2. The dogmatic part, in which democracy, independence and the federal nature of the Venezuelan State, among others, are established as pillars;
3. The organic part, which consisted of twelve titles for a total of 252 articles;
4. The transitory provisions composed of 23 provisions.
- Spanish was recognized as the official language.
- The Venezuelan State is divided into: States, the Federal District, Federal Territories and Federal Dependencies.
- The States are divided into Districts and these into Municipalities.
- There was no dual nationality, therefore a Venezuelan who obtained another nationality automatically lost his Venezuelan nationality.
- For the first time in the Venezuelan constitutional history, no mention is made of the name or number of States that make up the country, in order to avoid making constitutional reforms regarding this matter and to govern it by means of an Organic Law of political-territorial division.

=== Public Power ===
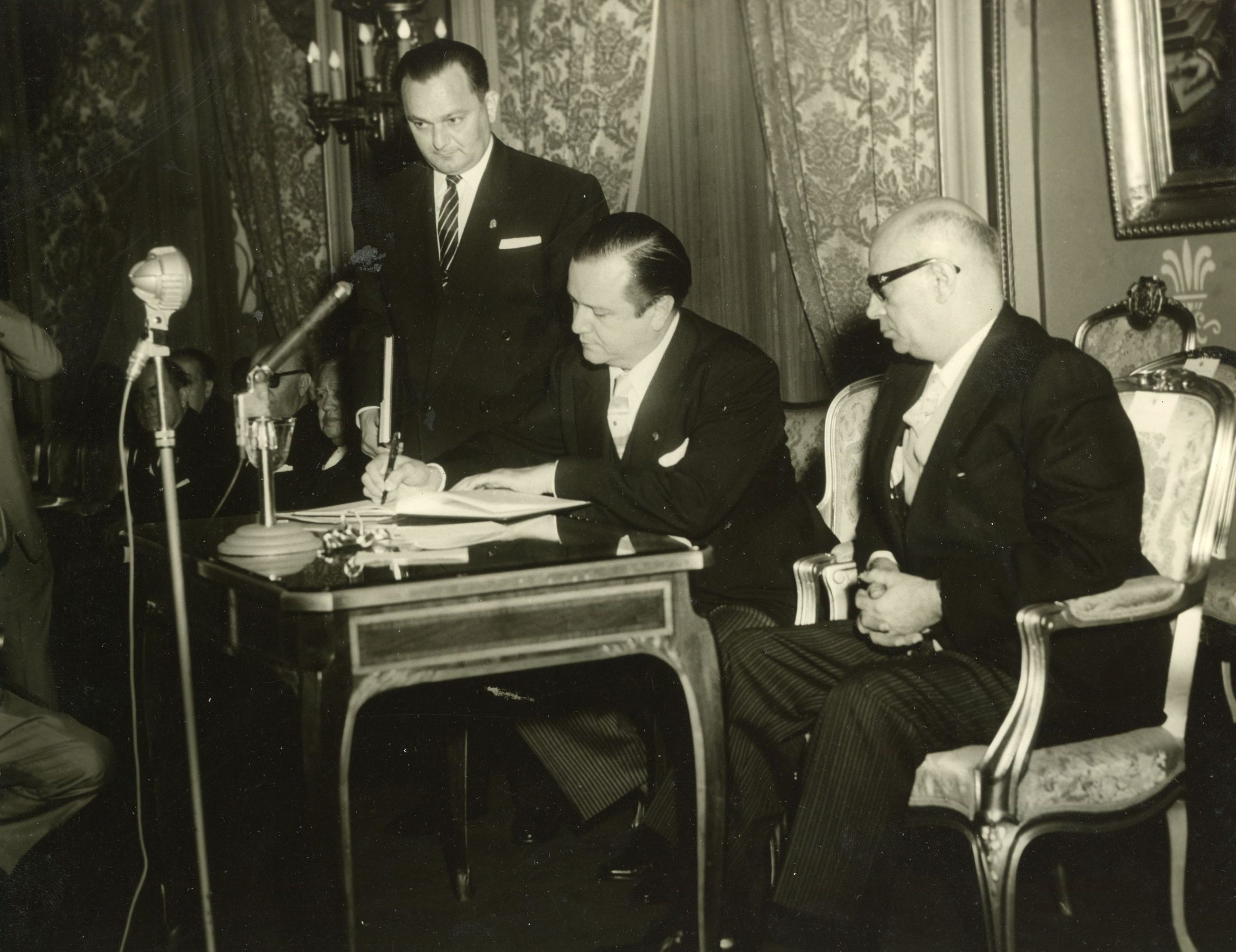
Rafael Caldera and Raúl Leoni, vice president and president of the National Congress, during the promulgation of the new constitution. Palacio Federal Legislativo, January 23, 1961.

The National Public Power, was composed of the Legislative, the Executive and the Judiciary.

- Legislative Power: exercised by the National Congress, which was composed of the Chamber of Deputies and the Chamber of Senators. The Deputies and Senators were elected for a 5-year term, with two Senators per State and two Senators for the Federal District, while the Deputies were elected by universal and direct voting and with proportional representation of minorities according to the population base of 1.1% of the total national population. The presidents of the Senate and the Chamber of Deputies would be the President and Vice President of the National Congress respectively. Those who once held the presidency of the Republic would become Senators for life at the end of their term.

In this Constitution the Comptroller General of the Republic was an auxiliary body of the National Congress, headed by the Comptroller General of the Republic elected for a period of 5 years by the National Congress.

- Executive power: exercised by the President of the Republic as head of State and of the National Executive or Government, who would be elected for a period of 5 years and could not be reelected until 10 years after the end of his term. The temporary absence of the President would be substituted by a Minister appointed by the President himself. The Ministers were also defined as the direct organs of the President of the Republic, which together formed the Council of Ministers.
- Judicial Power and the Public Prosecutor's Office: The Judicial Power was represented by the Supreme Court of Justice and other courts. The Supreme Court of Justice was composed of a minimum of five Magistrates per Chamber, elected by the National Congress for a term of 9 years.

In this constitution the Public Prosecutor's Office was an independent organ of the State, while in the new 1999 Constitution it is part of a new Power, the Citizen Power. The Public Prosecutor's Office was under the responsibility of the Attorney General of the Republic elected by the National Congress for a period of 5 years.

== Amendments ==
The Magna Carta of 1961 was the longest lasting Constitution of Venezuela, during its 38 years of existence it only suffered two amendments approved by the extinct National Congress:

=== First amendment ===
Enacted by the National Congress on May 9, 1973, promulgated by President Rafael Caldera and published in Official Gazette No. 1585 of May 11, 1973. In order to prevent those who had incurred in crimes during the exercise of a public office from running for President of the Republic, Senator or Deputy to the Congress or Magistrate of the Supreme Court of Justice (now Supreme Tribunal of Justice). Its purpose was to disqualify former President Marcos Perez Jimenez from being elected President of the Republic or holding a parliamentary office before the Congress.

=== Second amendment ===
Enacted by the National Congress in 1983 and promulgated by President Luis Herrera Campins on March 16 of the same year, it contemplated several innovative aspects. Among others: the reform of the electoral system for the Municipal Councils and Legislative Assemblies. The amendment was enacted after two years of discussions of the original project in Congress, which was not approved in its entirety. A proposal to expand the political rights of Venezuelans by naturalization and to allow the intervention of the Municipal Councils by the National Congress were rejected.

== See also ==
- Puntofijo Pact

Preceded by Constitution of Venezuela of 1953	Constitution of the Republic of Venezuela of 1961; 1961–1999	Succeeded by Constitution of Venezuela of 1999
