= Constitution of Venezuela (1864) =

Former constitution of Venezuela

Constitution of the United States of Venezuela
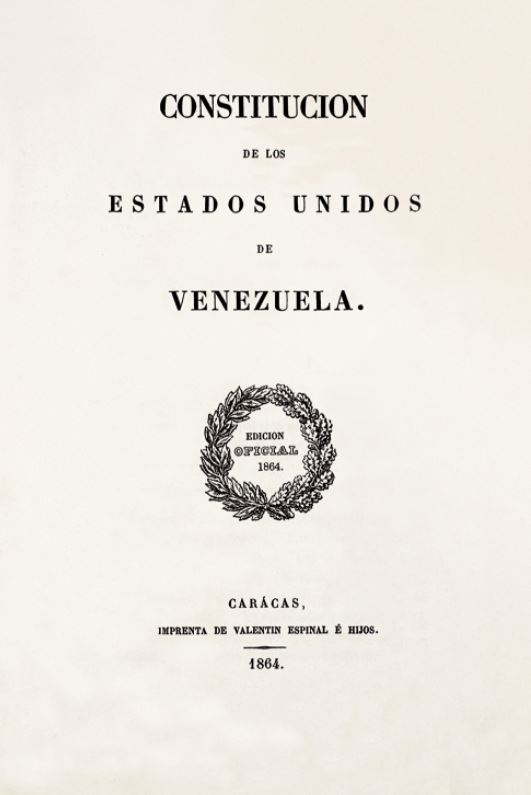
- Created: March 28, 1864
- Ratified: April 13, 1864
- Repealed: June 16, 1874
- Location: Caracas Federal Palace
- Author(s): Deputies of the Constituent Assembly of the Federation
- Signatories: 100 Deputies

The Constitution of Venezuela of 1864 (Official name: Constitution of the United States of Venezuela. Spanish: Constitución de los Estados Unidos de Venezuela) was approved on March 28, 1864 in the city of Caracas by the Constituent Assembly of the Federation, promulgated in Coro by the then president Juan Crisóstomo Falcón on April 13, 1864 and endorsed by the ministers on April 22 of the same year.

The National Constituent Assembly was constituted of 100 deputies elected in the provinces, per the 1863 decree of the Federal Executive. This decree summoned the people to carry out the corresponding elections. The National Constituent Assembly of the Federation was installed only in Caracas, on December 24, 1863, with the attendance of 69 deputies.

Although it was in force for only 10 years, historically it is considered one of the most important Venezuelan constitutions due to its content, especially for establishing a federal system for Venezuela at that time. It accentuates the decentralization aspects of the previous constitution of 1858 and the term "federal" is added more explicitly.

== Characteristics ==
- It is declared that the former provinces constitute, subsequently, 20 independent states, which together form a free nation.
- The name "Republic of Venezuela" is changed to "United States of Venezuela", which persists until 1953.
- The states enjoy political equality among themselves, and establish their own internal regime, in accordance with the principles of popular, elective, federal, representative, alternative and responsible government.
- It establishes the guarantees of Venezuelans covering the inviolability of life and correspondence; respect for property, the domestic home; freedom of thought, assembly and public and private association.
- The right to vote is granted to majority of Venezuelans men, with restrictions for female and under 18 years of age
- Primary education is decreed as compulsory and free.
- It authorizes the freedom of worship, even though it preserves the Catholic religion as the official creed of the nation.
- Regarding public powers, it adopts a tripartite division: executive, legislative, and judicial.
- The presidential term is 4 years and immediate reelection is not contemplated. The president must be Venezuelan by birth and have reached 30 years of age.
- The President must be in the Council of Ministers to make decisions.
- The National Legislature is the Congress and is formed by the Chamber of Senators and the Chamber of Deputies; the former are elected at the rate of 2 principals and 2 alternates for each state.
- The Federal High Court is formed by 5 members, selected by the Congress according to the list submitted by the legislatures of each state; both members and alternates serve for 4 years.
- The courts of justice of each federal entity are independent.

== See also ==
- Federal War

Preceded by Constitution of Venezuela of 1858	Constitutional History of Venezuela; Constitution of the United States of Venezuela of 1864; 1864–1874	Succeeded by Constitution of the United States of Venezuela of 1874
