= Palacio Federal Legislativo =

Historic building in Caracas, Venezuela

- Palacio Federal Legislativo
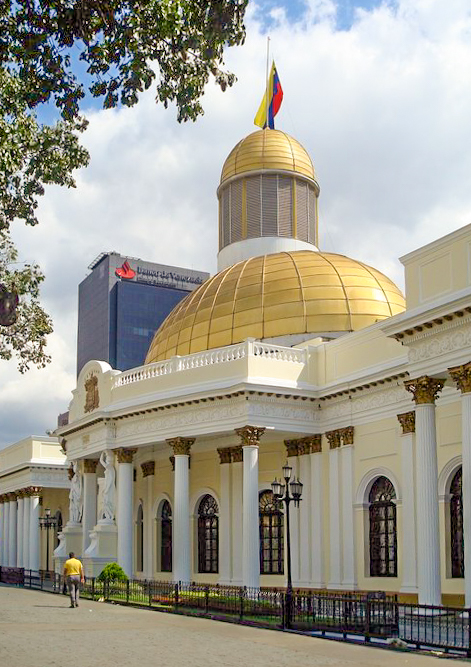
- The Palacio Federal Legislativo in Caracas (2009)
- Interactive map of the Palacio Federal Legislativo area

General information
- Type: Legislative palace
- Architectural style: Neoclassical
- Location: Caracas, Venezuela
- Coordinates: 10°30′41″N 66°54′12″W
- Current tenants: National Assembly
- Construction started: 1872
- Completed: 1877
- Owner: Government of Venezuela

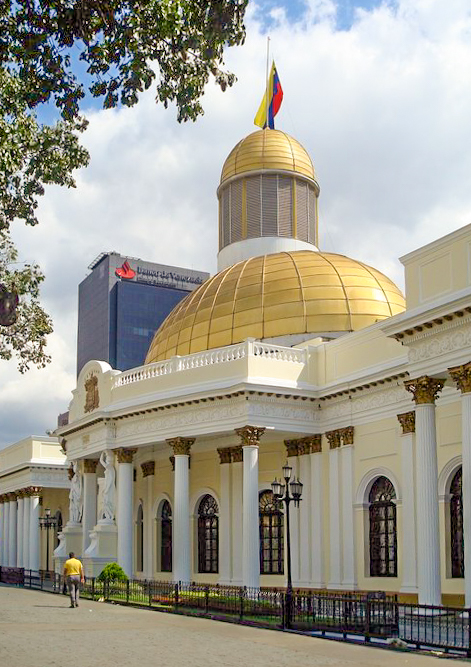
Palacio Federal Legislative, Caracas

The Palacio Federal Legislativo (English: Federal Legislative Palace), also known as the Capitolio, is a historic building in Caracas, Venezuela, which houses the National Assembly. Located southwest of the Plaza Bolívar, it was built between 1872 and 1877 by President Antonio Guzmán Blanco to a design by the architect Luciano Urdaneta Vargas. The Salón Elíptico, opened in 1877, is topped by a golden dome.

== Features ==
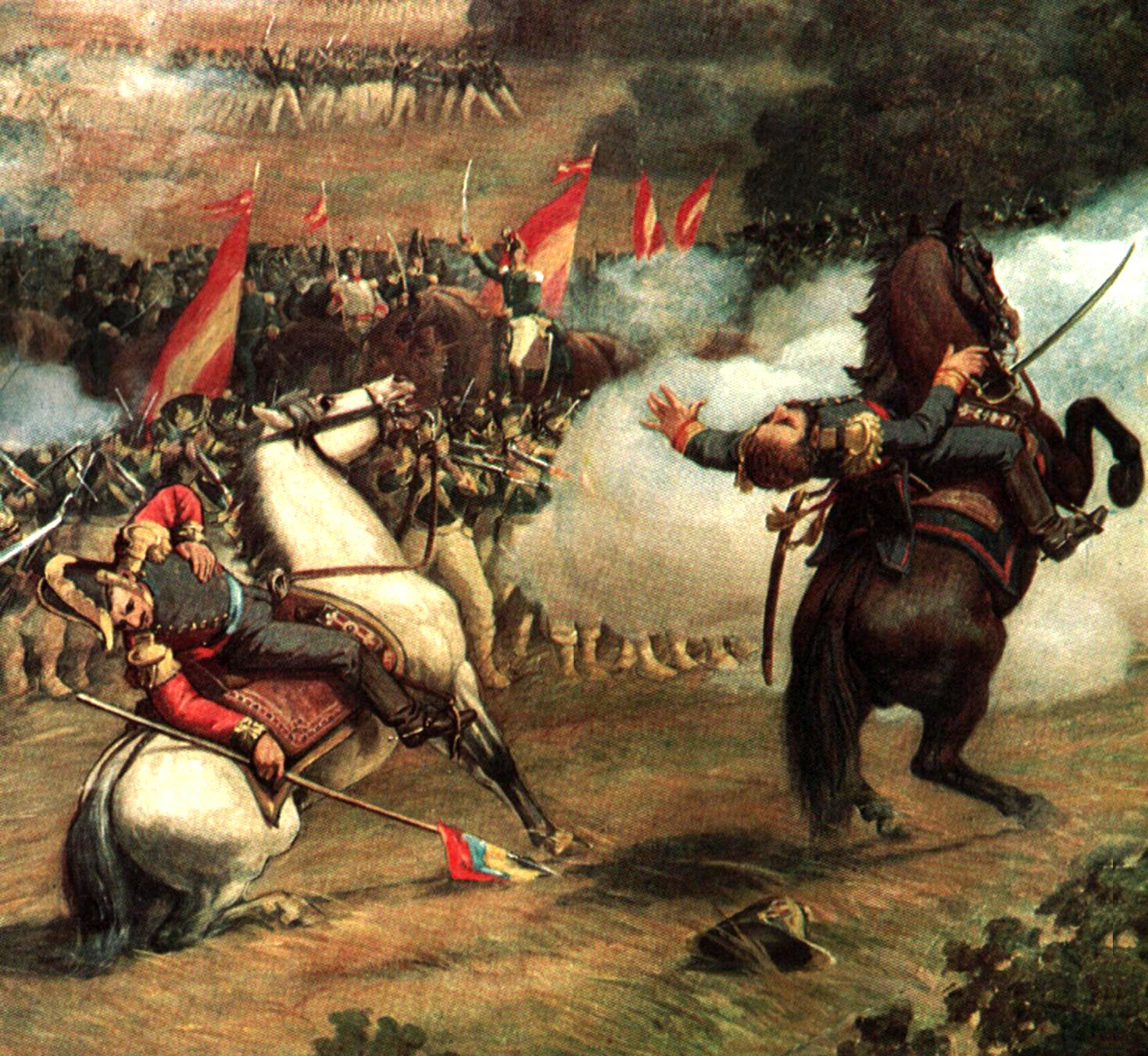
A scene from the Battle of Carabobo in the dome of Palacio Federal Legislativo

Presenting himself as a moderniser, Antonio Guzmán Blanco promoted anticlerical policies and the introduction of contemporary infrastructure to Venezuela, in particular in Caracas. The Palacio Federal Legislativo, located to the west of Plaza Bolívar, incorporates structural cast iron. It replaced a convent on the site.

The building is painted bright white and has a gilded oval-shaped dome crowning an elliptically shaped room (known as the Oval Room). The dome's ceiling has a painting by Martín Tovar y Tovar which vividly depicts the crucial Battle of Carabobo in the Venezuelan War of Independence against Spanish colonial rule.

The most notable professionals of the times were commissioned to design the building: Luciano Urdaneta and Roberto Garcia handled the engineering while the architect was Juan Hurtado Manrique. The complex consists of two rectangular volumes connected by two lower sections. It encloses a courtyard with a central fountain set in a small garden inside iron railings. The two Neoclassical buildings are known as the Legislative Palace and the Federal Palace. The first, completed in 1873, became the Congress in 1958 and the National Assembly in 2000.

The façade of the Legislative Palace, completed in 1877, is symmetrical in design. It has a portico at the center. The triangular pediment has a bas-relief of busts of Simón Bolívar and Antonio Guzmán Blanco. There are three columnated portals, the one in the centre presenting two caryatids representing Justice and Freedom. The building houses a number of notable paintings by Venezuelan artists of the nineteenth and early twentieth centuries including Martín Tovar y Tovar, Antonio Herrera Toro, Tito Salas, Pedro Centeno Vallenilla and Emilio Jacinto Mauri.

In addition to the dome painting of the Battle of Carabobo, the Oval Room also contains the Proceedings of the Constitutional Congress (1811–1812) which includes the handwritten version of the Declaration of Independence of Venezuela.

The complex has been a National Historic Monument since 22 August 1997.

== See also ==
- National Assembly (Venezuela)
- 2017 Constituent Assembly of Venezuela
