= Remigio Ceballos =

Venezuelan military officer

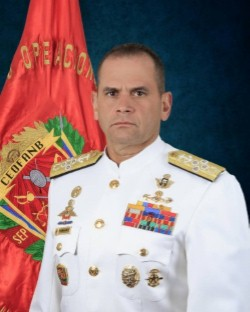
- Ceballos in 2020

Minister of Interior, Justice and Peace
- In office 19 August 2021 – 27 August 2024
- President: Nicolás Maduro
- Preceded by: Carmen Meléndez
- Succeeded by: Diosdado Cabello

Strategic Operations Commander of the Bolivarian National Armed Forces
- In office 20 June 2017 – 7 July 2021
- President: Nicolás Maduro
- Preceded by: Vladimir Padrino López
- Succeeded by: Domingo Lárez

Personal details
- Born: 1 May 1963 (age 63) Caracas, Venezuela
- Party: United Socialist Party of Venezuela
- Education: Military Academy of Venezuela

Military service
- Allegiance: Venezuela
- Branch/service: Bolivarian Navy of Venezuela

Remigio Ceballos Ichaso (born 1 May 1963) is a Venezuelan military officer who, as of 2020, holds the rank of admiral and served as commanding officer of the Strategic Command Operations of Venezuela. As a member of the Venezuelan Marine Corps, Ceballos advanced through rank promotions to his current position and has received military training in both the United States and Israel. He was previously an aide-de-camp to former President Hugo Chávez.

== Career ==
On July 18, 2016, he was appointed head of the vertex "Comprehensive Security and Defense Plan" of the Great Sovereign Supply Mission, created a week earlier by President Nicolás Maduro. He has held different positions within the Venezuelan State, among which are: Director of Research, Training and Doctrine of the Second Command and Headquarters of the General Staff of the General Command of the Bolivarian Militia, Commander of the Bolivarian Navy Infantry of the Naval Operations Command of the General Command of the Bolivarian Navy and Vice Minister for Planning and Development of Defense of the Ministry for Defense until July 2015.

On March 16, 2019, he announced: "The entire Armed Forces are deployed in all states addressing the electrical, hydrological, fuel services, and telecommunications systems."

== International sanctions ==
On November 5, 2019, Ceballos was sanctioned by the United States Department of the Treasury for acting “on behalf of the oppressive regime of former Venezuelan President Nicolás Maduro, which continues to be involved in egregious levels of corruption and human rights abuses,” said Steven Mnuchin, United States Secretary of the Treasury.

In 2021, he was sanctioned by the EU, making him subject to a travel ban and assets freeze in those jurisdictions, due to his fundamental role in oversight and abetment of serious human right abuses perpetrated by the FANB and the Bolivarian National Guard against peaceful demonstrators and opponents of the Maduro regime.

== See also ==
- International sanctions during the Venezuelan crisis
