= Vladimir Padrino López =

Venezuelan general (born 1963)

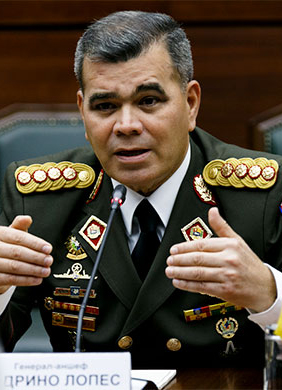
- Padrino in 2018

Minister of People's Power for Agriculture and Land
- Incumbent
- Assumed office 13 April 2026
- President: Delcy Rodríguez
- Preceded by: Julio León Heredia

Minister of Defense
- In office 24 October 2014 – 18 March 2026
- President: Nicolás Maduro; Delcy Rodríguez (acting)
- Preceded by: Carmen Meléndez
- Succeeded by: Gustavo González López

Strategic Operations Commander of the Bolivarian National Armed Forces
- In office 25 October 2014 – 20 June 2017
- President: Nicolás Maduro
- Preceded by: Wilmer Barrientos
- Succeeded by: Remigio Ceballos

Personal details
- Born: 30 May 1963 (age 63) Caracas, Venezuela
- Party: PSUV
- Education: Military Academy of Venezuela

Military service
- Allegiance: Venezuela
- Branch/service: Venezuelan Army
- Years of service: 1984–present
- Rank: General-in-chief

Vladimir Padrino López (born 30 May 1963) is a Venezuelan four-star general who was the Minister of Defense for the National Bolivarian Armed Forces of Venezuela from 2014 to 2026.

== Military career ==
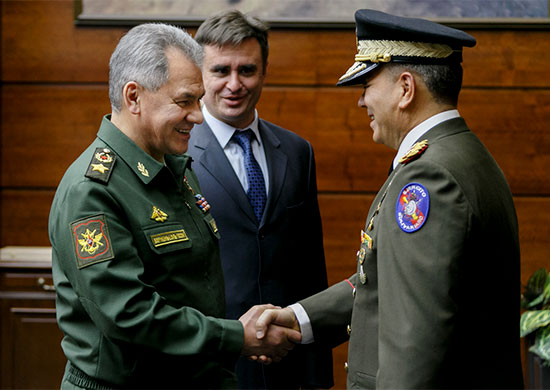
Padrino with Russian Minister of Defence Sergei Shoigu

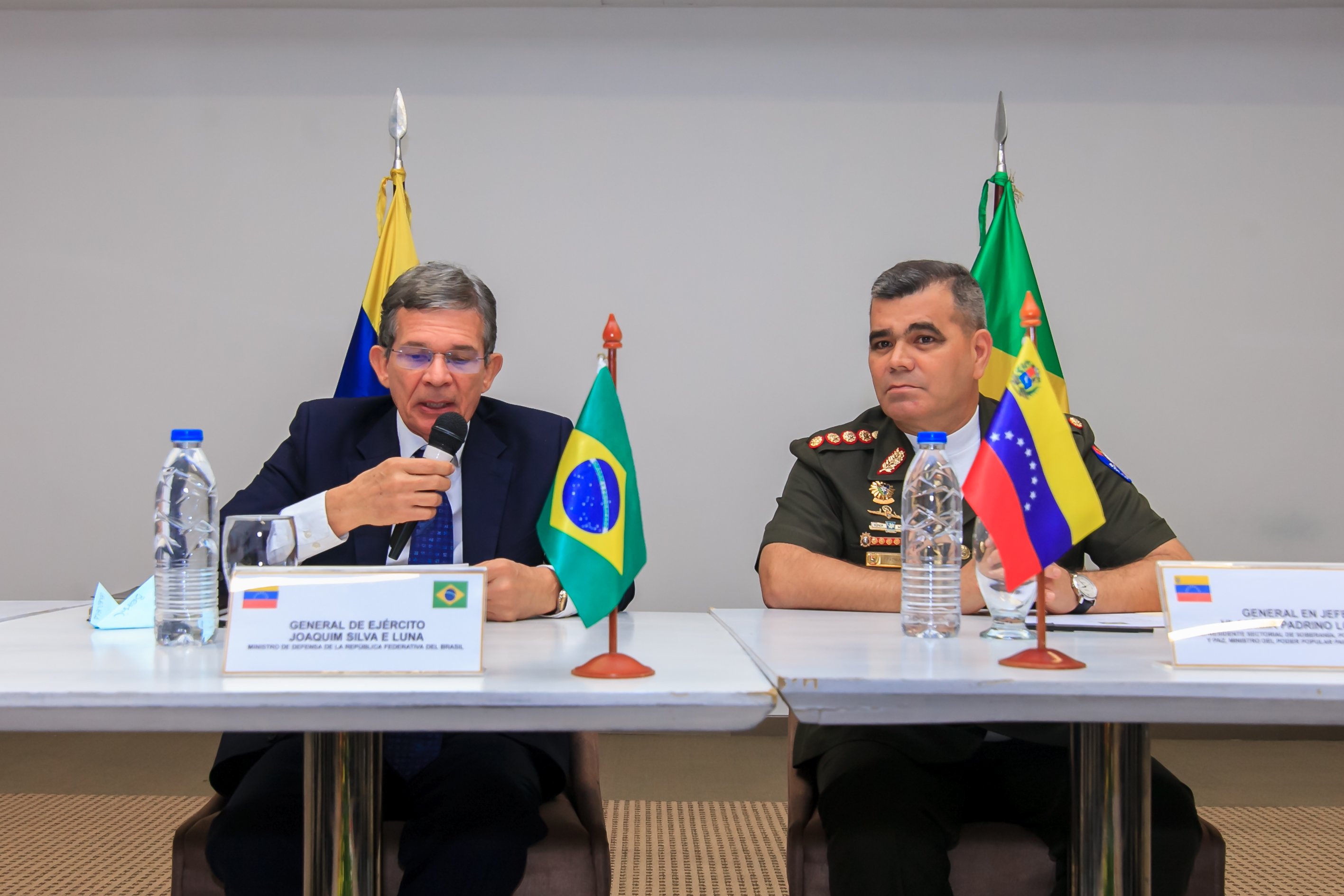
Padrino with Brazilian counterpart Joaquim Silva e Luna

On 5 July 1984, Padrino graduated from Military Academy of Venezuela. He commanded mortar personnel of the Antonio Ricaurte Infantry Battalion in Rubio, Táchira State. Between February and May 1995, Padrino attended courses on "Psychological Operations" and "Advanced Officer training" at Western Hemisphere Institute for Security Cooperation. During the 2002 Venezuelan coup d'état attempt, he was a colonel of the Simón Bolívar Infantry Battalion in Fuerte Tiuna, loyal to the government of Hugo Chávez. He was later appointed Chief of Joint Staff of the Strategic Defense Central Region Integral by President Chávez.

On 24 October 2014, Padrino was named by President Nicolás Maduro to be the successor of Carmen Meléndez as the Minister of Defense. Currently Padrino and the Minister of People's Power for Defense hold the positions of Strategic Operational commander of the Bolivarian National Armed Forces.

=== Increased authority ===
On 12 July 2016, President Maduro granted Padrino the powers to distribute food and medicine, authority over all Bolivarian missions, while also having his military command five of Venezuela's main ports.

This action performed by President Maduro made General Padrino one of the most powerful people in Venezuela, possibly "the second most powerful man in Venezuelan politics". Bloomberg's editorial board compared Padrino's appointment to the Cuban government's tactic of granting the Cuban military the power to manage Cuba's economy.

=== Presidential crisis ===
During the Venezuelan presidential crisis, Padrino announced the military's continued loyalty to Maduro. However the Juan Guaidó-led opposition continued to seek Padrino's cooperation to remove Maduro. John Bolton said Padrino was willing to defect, but Padrino professed loyalty on live TV later that day, and Padrino prepared the military to suppress opposition by force. Following the failed uprising, Padrino stated "All of us have to hold on tight, until the storm passes and at last we can see the faces of those of us who remain," which Ivan Briscoe of Foreign Affairs described as "not the most loyal public statement. Maduro may not have been fully satisfied with Padrino's handling of the opposition."

=== Capture of Nicolás Maduro ===
Padrino strongly condemned the 2026 United States intervention in Venezuela, which involved the capture of Maduro. Padrino supported the Supreme Tribunal of Justice appointment of Delcy Rodríguez as acting president in Maduro's absence. On 18 March 2026, Rodríguez dismissed Padrino as Minister of Defense. He was replaced by General Gustavo González López.

== Personal life ==
Padrino was married to engineer Yarazetd Jennifer Betancourt Contreras, who worked at PDVSA. He later had a romantic relationship with Vivian Arlet Ruiz Barrera.

== Sanctions ==
Padrino has been sanctioned by several countries and is banned from entering neighboring Colombia. The Colombian government maintains a list of people banned from entering Colombia or subject to expulsion; as of January 2019, the list had 200 people with a "close relationship and support for the Nicolás Maduro regime".

On 22 September 2017, Canada sanctioned Padrino due to rupture of Venezuela's constitutional order following the 2017 Venezuelan Constituent Assembly election. The United States government has also sanctioned Padrino on 25 September 2018 for his role in solidifying President Maduro's power in Venezuela.
