= Colombia–Venezuela relations =

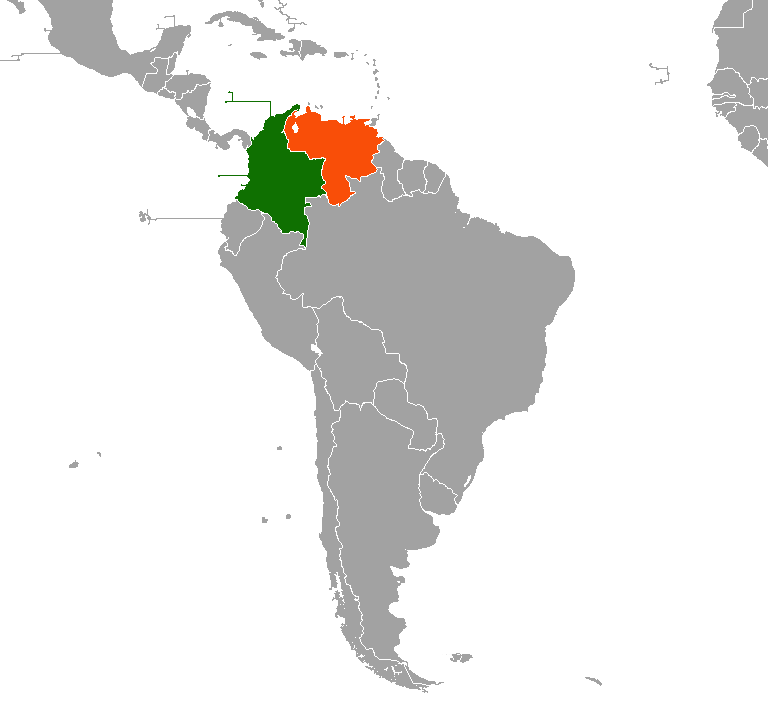
- Colombia: Venezuela

Diplomatic mission
- Embassy of Colombia, Caracas: Embassy of Venezuela, Bogotá

Envoy
- Ambassador Armando Benedetti: Ambassador Félix Plasencia

Map of the border between Colombia and Venezuela

The South American neighboring countries of Colombia and Venezuela maintain diplomatic relations. The relationship has developed since the early 16th century, when Spanish colonizers created the Province of Santa Marta (now Colombia) and the Province of New Andalucia (now Venezuela). The countries share a history of achieving their independence under Simón Bolívar and becoming one nation—the Gran Colombia—which dissolved in the 19th century. Since then, the overall relationship between the two countries has oscillated between cooperation and bilateral struggle.

== History ==
These neighboring countries share a similar history as parts of the Spanish Empire. The border dispute long predates the foundations of the modern nations, and goes back to the difficulties experienced in shaping a boundary between the colonies of Santa Marta (now Santa Marta, Colombia) and New Andalusia (now part of Venezuela). During the colonial era the Guajira Peninsula—then inhabited by the Wayuu indigenous group—resisted the invasion of the Spaniards coming from Santa Marta and New Andalusia, a situation which prevented the colonies from delimiting their territories in the area. The Wayuu tribes were finally subdued by the end of the colonial period with the independence of both colonies in the early 19th century. The new independent began formal negotiations to divide the Guajira peninsula in a longitudinal manner. Negotiations failed and the parties asked Spain to intervene. In 1891 the Spanish crown issued a judgment but failed once again to delimit the border because of confusing geographical locations.

Since the 20th century the relationship has evolved with ups and downs mostly regarding the Colombia–Venezuela maritime territory dispute over the Gulf of Venezuela. The lowest point in the relationship occurred on August 19, 1987, after the Colombian corvette ARC Caldas (FM-52) trespassed into disputed waters and then President of Venezuela, Jaime Lusinchi, ordered the Venezuelan Air Force to the area. The standoff was resolved through diplomatic channels but the dispute remained.

The ongoing armed conflict since 1964 between the Colombian government and guerrilla groups has also provoked impasses between the two countries. Military illegal incursions by the two countries' military forces into each other's territory have been frequent since the conflict in Colombia escalated in the 1980s, which subsequently triggered forced displacements in Colombia and into Venezuela. Illegally armed groups also trespassed into Venezuela. Contraband flows from one territory to another depending on supply and demand along the shared porous border of 1,375 miles (2,210 km). Illegal products range from gasoline, drugs and weapons to stolen cars. Since 2002, the relationship between Venezuela and Colombia has fluctuated due to ideological differences between both governments.

Relations were cut in 2019, after humanitarian aid was supposed to arrive through the Venezuelan-Colombian border. Venezuelan president Nicolás Maduro stated, that it was an open front for a coup. Relations have improved since the election of Gustavo Petro as president of Colombia.

== Chronology ==
=== 1922–1941 ===
End of land border dispute

In 1939 the Venezuelan government issued a decree imposing a maritime border line from the village of Castilletes in Guajira Peninsula to Paraguaná Peninsula which result in most of the Gulf belonging to Venezuela. The Colombian government reacted to this in the late 1940s asking the Venezuelan government to rectify and draw a middle line in accordance with the United Nations Convention on the Law of the Sea.

In 1941 once again bilateral negotiations resumed settling the territorial border, successfully agreeing upon the Venezuela-Colombia Boundary Treaty of 1941, but setting off a new round of differences regarding the maritime territory.

=== 1941–1987 ===
On April 5, 1941, Colombia and Venezuela created the Tratado de delimitación terrestre y de navegación de ríos comunes (Common rivers navigation and terrestrial delimitation treaty).

==== Secession of Los Monjes Archipelago ====
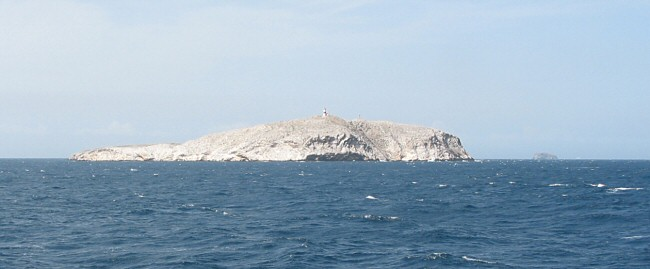
Monjes del Sur (South Island), from the south

On November 22, 1952, the Colombian government renounced its claims over the Los Monjes Archipelago. The treaty was signed by chancellors Esteban Gil Borges, from Venezuela and Luis López de Mesa, from Colombia, with the presence of the ambassadors Santiago Rodríguez and Alberto Pumarejo in the city of Cúcuta.

=== 1987–1991 ===
==== The Caldas frigate crisis ====
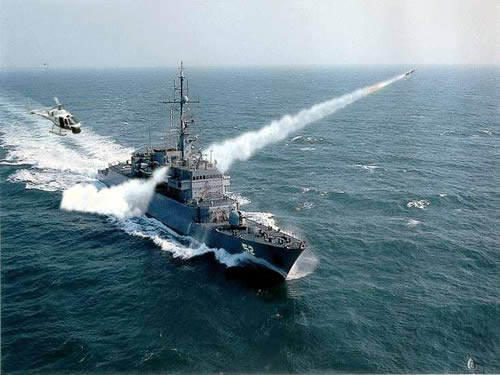
The ARC Caldas (FM-52) is an Almirante Padilla class frigate

Tensions escalated on August 11, 1987, as a result of the Caldas frigate incident, when the Colombian guided missile frigate Caldas entered waters claimed by Venezuela. The Venezuelan government reacted by sending a fleet of F-16 fighter jets and almost engaging in combat.

Once again, on June 20, 1989, Colombia and Venezuela created the Comisión de vecindad Colombo-Venezolana (Colombo-Venezuelan neighborhood Commission). Colombia and Venezuela then signed the Accord of Open Skies on May 18, 1991. Both countries also create the Comisión mixta para el control del tráfico de estupefacientes (Mixed Commission for the Control of Illegal Drugs Traffic).

=== Combifron: 1994–1998 ===
In 1994 Colombian and Venezuelan government created the Comisión binacional de Fronteras (Combifron) or "Binational Commission of Frontiers" which intended to exchange military intelligence between the two countries.

==== 1995 – ELN incursion in Venezuela ====
On February 25, 1995, the Colombian guerrilla group National Liberation Army (ELN) attacked a fluvial military post, penetrating on the Venezuelan side and killing 8 Venezuelans and injuring 12 Marines.

=== Chávez presidency: 1998–2012 ===
On April 30, 1998, The ELN guerrilla assaulted the Colombian border town of Ragonvalia. After the attacks the guerrillas crossed the border into Venezuela. Venezuelan president Rafael Caldera authorized the Colombian Army to enter Venezuela and fight the guerrillas.

==== 2000 – Venezuelan military incursion in Colombia ====
On March 21, 2000, Four Venezuelan helicopters and two airplanes entered Colombian airspace and bombarded an area in the jungle region of Catatumbo, in the Department of North Santander. On April 23, Colombian and Venezuelan governments signed an accord of understanding the issues of population displacement. This in regards to the Colombian nationals displaced by the conflict and crossing into Venezuela. Between May and June 2000, Venezuelan truckers blocked the border crossing between the two countries protesting the lack of guarantees for their safety in Colombia due to the constant attacks perpetrated by the Colombian guerrillas.

==== 2001 – Ballestas case ====
In February 2001 the ELN commander José María Ballestas, accused in Colombia of hijacking an Avianca airplane, was captured in Venezuela but later released causing diplomatic tensions between the governments of Hugo Chávez and Andrés Pastrana.

Ballestas was later recaptured by Venezuelan authorities and in December 2001, was extradited from Venezuela to Colombia.

==== 2002 – Coup d'état against Hugo Chávez ====
After the 2002 Venezuelan coup d'état attempt toppled Chávez for two days, Pedro Carmona fled house arrest and asked for political asylum at the Colombian ambassador's residence in Caracas, which he was later granted. The government of Hugo Chávez criticized the decision but granted Carmona safe passage out of Venezuela.

==== Rodrigo Granda ====
In 2004 the relationship became strained again in the Rodrigo Granda affair, with the kidnapping in Caracas of Colombian-Venezuelan naturalized guerrilla member Rodrigo Granda. Granda was transported by his captors to the border city of Cúcuta in Colombia and taken into custody by the Colombian National Police on rebellion charges.

==== 2007 – Post-humanitarian exchange negotiation ====
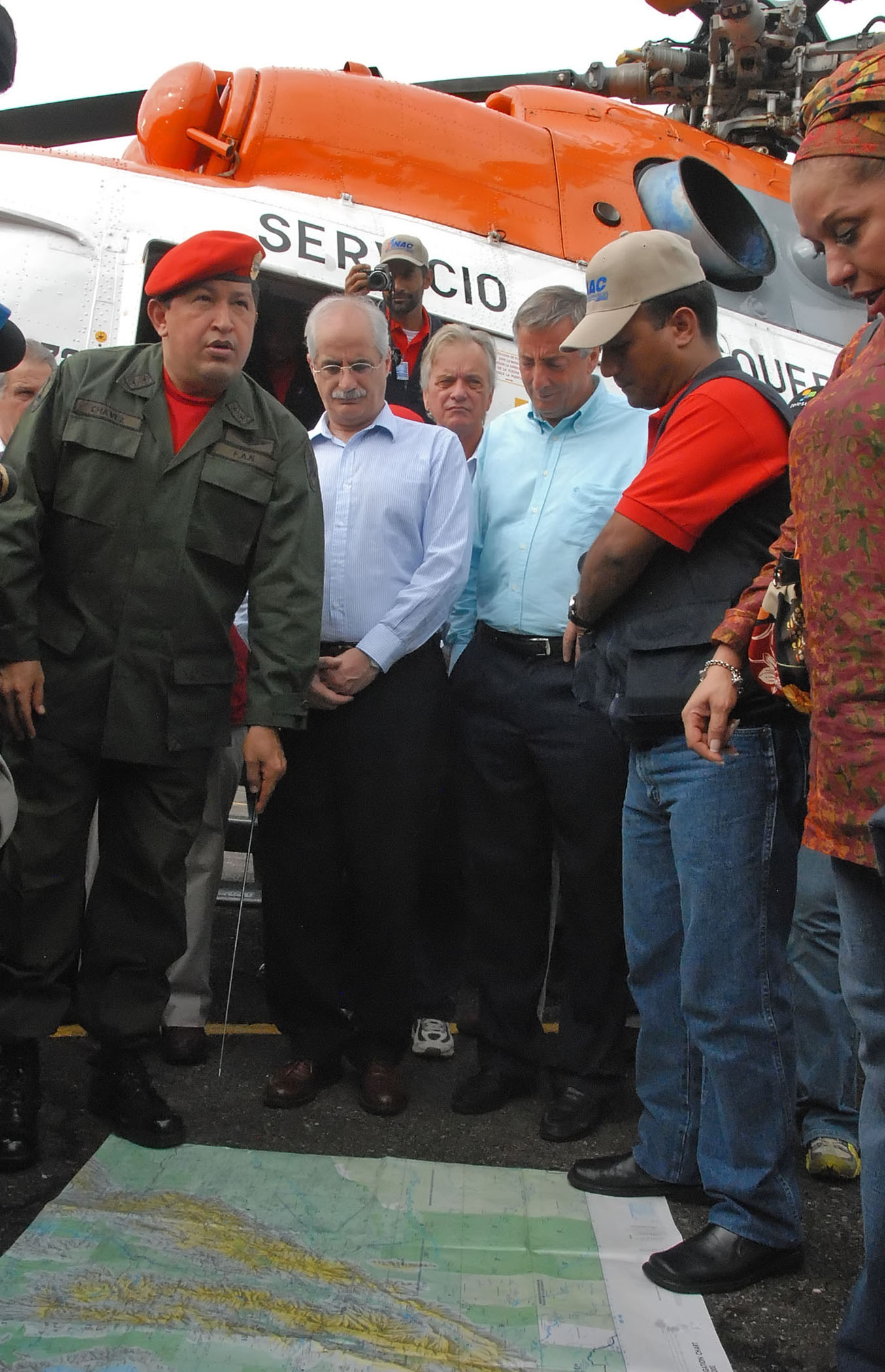
Hugo Chávez with the guarantors of "Operation Emmanuel"

In late 2007 Colombian President Álvaro Uribe, through his appointed negotiator Piedad Córdoba, contacted Venezuelan President Hugo Chávez to facilitate the humanitarian exchange negotiations of prisoners for hostages between the government of Colombia and the Revolutionary Armed Forces of Colombia.

During a private meeting at the 2007 Ibero-American Summit, Uribe told Chávez not to contact Colombian military commanders. Two weeks after the summit, Chávez tried to communicate with the General of the Colombian National Army Mario Montoya Uribe. The issue was reported to Uribe who publicly announced the interruption of Chávez and Córdoba as facilitators.

==== Operation Emmanuel ====
While relations between the two governments continued to be strained, on December 27, 2007, Chávez publicly said that he had a plan set up to rescue the three hostages promised to Chávez by the FARC guerrilla in compensation. This was after Colombian president Uribe decided to end the mediation by Chávez and Piedad Córdoba.

Operation Emmanuel used Venezuelan aircraft in coordination with the International Red Cross to fly into Colombia and rescue the hostages from the FARC.

==== Operation Road to Freedom ====
In February 2008, the Venezuelan government launched a new operation to liberate four more hostages held by the FARC: Luis Eladio Perez, Orlando Beltran, Gloria Polanco and Jorge Eduardo Géchem all of them former senators kidnapped by the FARC in order to pressure the Colombian government.

==== 2008 Andean diplomatic crisis ====
On March 1, 2008, the Colombian military launched an attack against FARC in the border area between Colombia and Ecuador, which ended with the death of some 19 guerrillas, including the group's second-in-command Raúl Reyes. The attack targeted a guerrilla camp some 1.8 km inside Ecuadorean territory.

Colombian president Álvaro Uribe called Ecuadorean president Rafael Correa, arguing that Colombian forces had crossed the border during combat in pursuit of the guerrillas. Correa said he would investigate the events and later accused the Colombian government of lying, recalling his ambassador in Bogotá. The Colombian government subsequently apologized for its actions.

Reacting to the event, Hugo Chávez stated that if Colombia launched a similar operation within Venezuelan borders he would consider it a casus belli and verbally attacked the Colombian president. Chavez ordered ten national guard battalions to the Colombia–Venezuela border and closed its embassy in Bogotá. Chavez also offered his support to Ecuadorean president Correa. On March 9, 2008, the Venezuelan government announced that it was re-establishing normal diplomatic ties with Colombia.

Chavez asked Latin American nations and the European Union to remove FARC from their lists of terrorist organizations, which they roundly refused to do. FARC was added to the European Union's list in 2002 after the kidnapping of Íngrid Betancourt, one of the 700 hostages held by FARC as of 2008. In June 2008 Chávez worked to get FARC rebels in Colombia to release hostages and end their war against the Colombian government. Later, he withdrew his support for FARC.

=== Los Maniceros massacre ===
In late July, the Colombian government claimed that AT4 anti-tank recoilless guns purchased by Venezuela were being used by the FARC. In response, President Chavez ordered most staff members of the embassy in Colombia to return to Venezuela, including the ambassador. Only the "lowest functionaries" were left to staff the embassy. Venezuela halted imports of Colombian cars and banned a Colombian energy firm from Venezuela's oil-rich Orinoco region. The Venezuelan ambassador was later sent back to Bogotá.

President Chávez stated that the five anti-tank rockets were stolen when the Colombian guerrilla group FARC attacked a military post in 1995 and took the armaments. However, Colombian newsweekly Revista Semana reported that the attack on the Venezuelan outpost in 1995 was actually carried out by the National Liberation Army (ELN) instead of FARC and that Chávez could not explain how the weapons would have passed from one guerrilla group to another. In addition, former Venezuelan military personnel denied that the rockets in question were ever present in the outpost.

==== 2010 – FARC files ====
The 2010 Colombia-Venezuela diplomatic crisis was a diplomatic stand-off between Colombia and Venezuela over allegations in July 2010 by outgoing President Álvaro Uribe that the Venezuelan government was actively permitting the Colombian FARC and ELN guerillas to seek safe haven in its territory. Uribe presented evidence to the Organization of American States (OAS) allegedly drawn from laptops acquired in Colombia's 2008 raid on a FARC camp in Ecuador, which had sparked the 2008 Andean diplomatic crisis. In response to the allegations Venezuela broke off diplomatic relations, and there was speculation of a possible war. The crisis was resolved after Juan Manuel Santos was inaugurated as the new President of Colombia on 7 August 2010, and the intervention of UNASUR bringing together Santos and Venezuelan President Hugo Chávez. Chávez told the guerillas that there could be no military solution to the conflict, and Santos agreed to turn over the disputed laptops to the Ecuadorean government. Colombia and Venezuela agreed to re-establish diplomatic relations.

=== Maduro presidency: 2013–2026 ===
==== 2013 Henrique Capriles ====
In 2013, a new diplomatic crisis erupted because of discomfort expressed by the Venezuelan government of Nicolás Maduro for the reception of opposition leader Henrique Capriles by his Colombian counterpart Juan Manuel Santos at the Presidential Palace in May 2013. Capriles was on a regional tour denouncing the alleged fraud in the presidential elections of 2013 in which the "successor" of Hugo Chávez had won by a narrow margin.

For his part, the President of the National Assembly of Venezuela, Diosdado Cabello relate this meeting with an "alleged plot" between opposition sectors in both Venezuela and Colombia to try a coup d'état to depose Maduro. Bilateral relations were normalized in July 2013 with a presidential meeting held in the Venezuelan city of Puerto Ayacucho.

==== 2015 Venezuela–Colombia border dispute ====
In mid-late August 2015 a new crisis develops after the government of Nicolas Maduro closed the passage through the Simón Bolívar International Bridge, a border crossing linking Colombia and Venezuela in Táchira state and deported Colombian citizens who were in this state. According to the Venezuelan government, Colombian militias were allegedly involved in an attack on Venezuelan soldiers in the area, as well as illegal activities such as smuggling gasoline and other basic goods. Venezuelan authorities warned that the closure could be extended to all of the bilateral border with Colombia. The crisis resulted in tens of thousands of Colombians living in Venezuela being displaced. In mid-September 2015, Venezuela flew two fighter jets along the Venezuela/Colombian Border.

==== 2018–2022 military concerns, Duque presidency ====
Following revelations on 5 July 2018 that United States president Donald Trump made comments regarding options involving military intervention in Venezuela, options which the Colombian government distanced itself from, former Venezuelan military officer and high-level official Pedro Carreño stated that if the United States were to attack Venezuela, the Venezuelan military would immediately fire on targets in Colombia. Carreño stated that Venezuelan Sukhoi fighter jets would destroy the seven bridges crossing the Magdalena River in order to virtually divide Colombia in two. Days later on 12 July 2018, the Venezuelan military placed missiles and anti-air equipment on its border with Colombia in Táchira, placing Colombian forces on alert. The Lima Group expressed "deep concern" about Venezuela's militarized stance towards Colombia, further criticizing Venezuela's human rights record.

A month later, following the 2018 Caracas bombing on 4 August 2018, the Venezuelan government blamed Colombia as the mastermind behind the incident, stating that Venezuela will "hold the Colombian government responsible for any new aggression". Upon assuming the Colombian Presidency on August 7, 2018, Iván Duque announced that he would not have an ambassador in Venezuela because he does not recognise the Maduro administration. He did maintain that consular relations would continue, as a necessity to discuss border disputes.

On 12 August 2018, former Foreign Minister of Venezuela, Roy Chaderton, stated that Venezuelans are "more civilized" than Colombians and referred to himself as "part of the Pedro Carreño command" of the Bolivarian government, believing that Venezuelan troops must conquer Colombia and "reach the Pacific, because at last and finally we liberate the countries whose coasts are bathed by the Pacific Ocean...I believe that we...have military superiority".

On 19 December 2018, Carlos Manuel Pino García, an advisor to the Venezuelan embassy in Colombia, was arrested outside a restaurant in Bogotá, taken north to Cúcuta on the Venezuelan border, and deported to Venezuela before sunrise the next morning. He had lived in Colombia ever since authorities captured him along with three other Venezuelans on 26 May 1999 at a FARC encampment in the wilderness in Colombia's Vichada department near the Venezuelan border. The men arrested in 1999 were suspected of collaborating with the FARC, but Venezuela did not cooperate with Colombia's investigation, so Colombia released them. Colombia's immigration agency justified Pino's 2018 deportation by pointing to legislation against activities by foreigners that "threaten national security, public order, public health, or public safety" and claiming that Pino did not have diplomatic immunity. Pino will not be allowed to return to Colombia for ten years, after which he must apply for a visa to enter Colombia. He is married to Colombian former senator Gloria Inés Flórez, with whom he has a Colombian son. Flórez had worked for Gustavo Petro from 2014 to 2015 while he was mayor of Bogotá, and she continued to support Petro, who subsequently lost the 2018 presidential election to Iván Duque. 23 February 2019 relationship were broken.

===== Invoking the RIO treaty =====
In a tough stance against Venezuela, members of the Inter-American Treaty of Reciprocal Assistance decided to invoke the Inter-American Treaty of Reciprocal Assistance (RIO treaty), which will follow joint actions, including economic sanctions to the use of military force and ending transport and communications links.

===== Breaking relations and closing embassies =====
On February 23, 2019, Maduro cut off diplomatic ties with Colombia. All embassies and consulates were closed and the diplomats were evacuated. This situation persisted until August 28, 2022, when Colombia and Venezuela restored diplomatic relations following the election of Colombian President Gustavo Petro.

===== 74th United Nations General Assembly =====
At the 74th United Nations General Assembly General Debate, President Iván Duque Márquez presented a 128-page dossier revealing Venezuela's support of a plot for a cross-border penetration by assisting a criminal network, which is against Colombia.

On September 30, 2019, Colombia's defense minister Guillermo Botero summoned the media to divulge evidence proving that Venezuela is sheltering and coordinating with the National Liberation Army (ELN) to plan attacks against Colombia.

==== Gustavo Petro (2022–2026) ====
On June 19, 2022, Gustavo Petro was elected the 34th President of Colombia. He was sworn in on August 7. On August 26, Petro asked his ambassador to Venezuela to establish all ties with neighboring countries. The phone calls were made during the act of possession.

"Ambassador, go and see how Colombia's house is, over there," Petro said. "There are 16 consulates that have to be filled, we have talked about people with diplomatic careers, all of them, the 16. We have to repair the damage to the houses and the damage to the hearts. The first one. So that no one ever thinks of entering Venezuela and Colombia there has to be a conflict, a war or something like that"

— Gustavo Petro, on reopening of relations with Venezuela; likewise, Petro stated that the rupture of binational ties in the past was a huge mistake that caused the violation of human rights, especially of the border population.

Benedetti assured that one of his first goals as ambassador to Venezuela would be to boost trade between neighboring countries, which would benefit border residents in particular.

On Tuesday, November 1, 2022, President Gustavo Petro arrived in Caracas for an official visit to Venezuela and to meet President Nicolas Maduro. He first arrived at Maiquetia Airport and was received by Venezuelan Vice President Delcy Rodriguez, whereupon he immediately went to Caracas, where President Maduro was waiting at the main entrance of the Miraflores Palace when Petro arrived. Petro was accompanied by Chief of Staff Laura Sarabia; Minister of Foreign Relations Álvaro Leyva Durán; Colombian Ambassador to Venezuela Armando Benedetti; Venezuelan Ambassador to Colombia Felix Plasencia and Colombian Ambassador to the Organization of American States Luis Ernesto Vargas. The presidents were set to hold a private meeting in the Ayacucho Hall of the Miraflores Palace, followed by a meeting of delegations to discuss issues such as open borders, trade, Latin American democracy and Venezuela's accession.

On 24 April 2026, President Gustavo Petro became the first foreign leader to visit Venezuela’s interim President Delcy Rodríguez after the 2026 United States intervention in Venezuela.

== See also ==
- Foreign relations of Colombia
- Foreign relations of Venezuela
- 2008 Andean diplomatic crisis
