= Venezuela–Colombia Boundary Treaty of 1941 =

1941treaty between Colombia and Venezuela

Colombia–Venezuela Boundary Treaty of 1941
Tratado de Demarcación de Fronteras y Navegación de los ríos comunes entre Colombia y Venezuela
- Type: Limit Treaty
- Drafted: 1941
- Signed: April 5, 1941
- Location: Villa del Rosario, Norte de Santander, Colombia
- Effective: September 12, 1941
- Signatories: Luis López de Mesa; Esteban Gil Borges
- Parties: Colombia; Venezuela
- Language: Spanish
- Documento Tratado López de Mesa-Gil Borges (pág. 42)

The Colombia–Venezuela Boundary Treaty of 1941, officially the Border Demarcation Agreement and Navigation of the Common Rivers between Colombia and Venezuela, and unofficially the López de Mesa-Gil Borges Treaty, was an agreement signed between the governments of Colombia and Venezuela on the land border limits on April 5, 1941, in Colombian city of Villa del Rosario, Norte de Santander, by the Ministers of Foreign Relations of Venezuela, Esteban Gil Borges, and Colombia, Luis López de Mesa.

After almost 60 years of negotiations on the demarcation of the Venezuelan–Colombian border (1881–1938), the treaty of 1941 put an end to this long process. In this treaty, both parties acknowledged that the border had been fully demarcated, differences over boundary matters were completed, and recognized the work carried out by the 1901 Demarcation Committee and the Swiss experts Committee as valid demarcation. The exchange of ratifications of this agreement was made in Caracas, on September 12, 1941.

The land border between Colombia and Venezuela is a conflict zone of perennial tension between the two countries, due to problems such as Illegal drug trade, smuggling or illegal trade, the presence of high-risk diseases that often spread on both sides of the boundary lines, and the presence of the Colombian guerrillas.
