= Bolivarian Army of Venezuela =

Land-based branch of the Armed Forces of Venezuela

Bolivarian Army
- Ejército Bolivariano
- Venezuelan Army emblem
- Founded: 19 April 1810; 216 years ago
- Country: Venezuela
- Type: Army
- Role: To protect and guarantee the permanent sovereignty of the nation against any external, or internal threats.
- Part of: National Bolivarian Armed Forces of Venezuela
- Patron: Our Lady of Mount Carmel
- Motto: "Forger of liberties"
- Colors: Blue, Red
- March: Venezuelan National Army Hymn (Himno del Ejercito Nacional Bolivariano de Venezuela)
- Anniversaries: 24 June, Army Day and anniversary of the Battle of Carabobo
- Engagements: Venezuelan War of Independence; Spanish American wars of independence; Gran Colombia–Peru War; Blue revolution; Federal War; The thousand days war: El Carupanazo; El Porteñazo; Machurucuto incident; 1960's Guerrilla War; Colombian conflict; 2021 Apure clashes; Crisis in Venezuela; Pemon conflict; Attack on Fort Paramacay; El Junquito raid; Operation Gideon (2020); 2023 Guayana Esequiba crisis; Operation Southern Spear

Commanders
- Minister of the People's Power for Defense of the Republic of Venezuela: General-in-chief Gustavo González López
- Notable commanders: Simon Bolivar; Francisco de Miranda; José Tadeo Monagas; Juan Crisóstomo Falcón; José Antonio Páez; Santiago Mariño; Carlos Soublette

Insignia
- Flag

The Bolivarian Army of Venezuela (Spanish: Ejército Bolivariano), is the land arm of the National Bolivarian Armed Forces of Venezuela. Also known as Bolivarian Army (Ejército Bolivariano, EB), its role is to be responsible for land-based operations against external or internal threats that may put the sovereignty of the nation at risk. The army is the second largest military branch of Venezuela after the Bolivarian Militia (Milicia Bolivariana, MB).

Its current commander is Major General Johan Alexander Hernández Lárez. The army depends directly on the Ministry of Popular Power for Defense, under the orders of the general commander and the president of the Republic in his position as commander in chief of the National Bolivarian Armed Forces. It is divided into six combat arms and four commands; operations, logistics, education and Army Aviation.

The Venezuelan Army marks its birth by its victory in the Battle of Carabobo on 24 June 1821 over the Empire of Spain, which led to the independence of the nation. It later contributed to the independence of the present-day countries of Colombia, Ecuador, Panama, Peru, and Bolivia.

== History ==
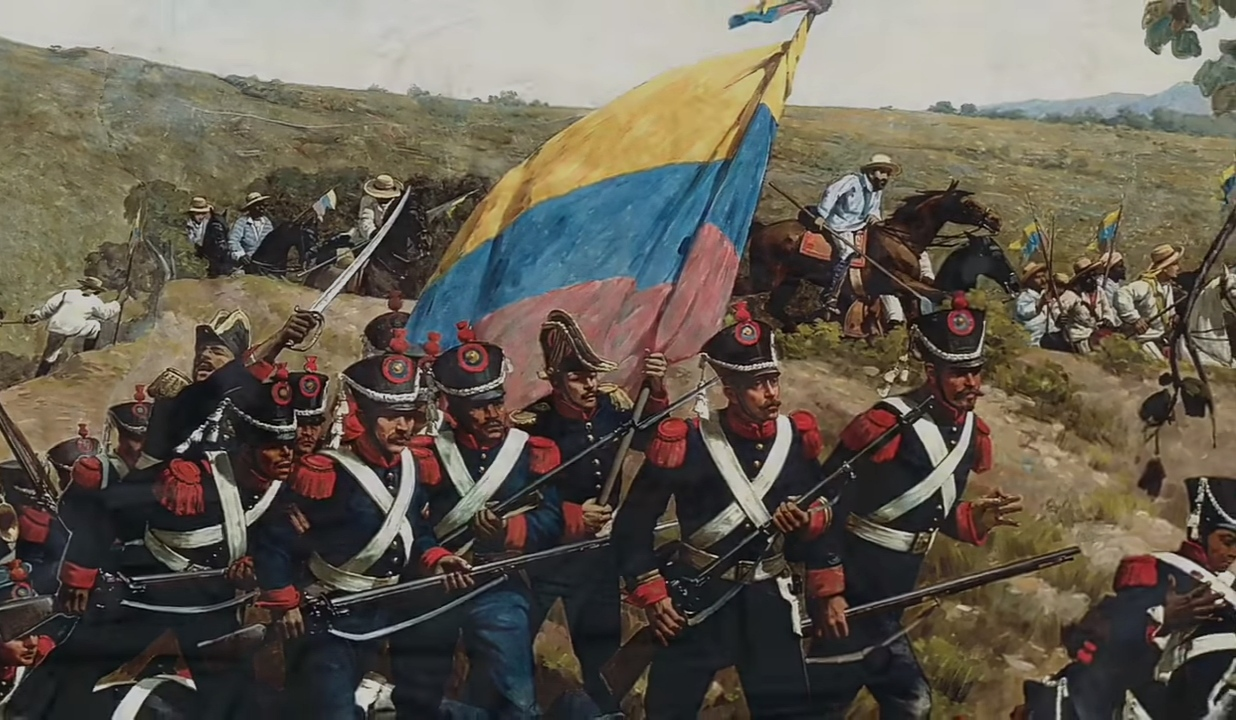
Detail of The Battle of Carabobo (1887) by Martín Tovar y Tovar.

=== Independence ===
With the beginning of the independence movement on 19 April 1810 and the subsequent war in the country, a military academy was created in 1810 by decree of the Supreme Board of Caracas for the training of officers for the Republican cause. The Royalist reaction was fast and by 1812 the First Republic was dissolved. A war to the death begun (guerra a muerte), with neither side giving quarter.

On 11 April 1817, 1,800 Republicans under General Píer won a major victory against the Royalists at San Félix (southeast of Caracas), where the revolutionaries defeated 1,500 Royalists under General Nicolás María Cerruti. The Royalists suffered 593 dead and 497 captured, of whom 160 peninsulares (Spaniards born in the Iberian Peninsula). All of the Spaniards were decapitated. The Republicans lost 31 dead and 65 wounded.

The war continued until 1824 with successes and failures on each side. On 7 August 1819, the army of New Granada, under the command of the Liberator Simón Bolívar, defeats the Royalist troops under the command of General José María Barreiro in the Battle of Boyacá, being the first republic of the so-called Bolivarianas (Bolivarians) to obtain their independence of the Kingdom of Spain; a day that also celebrates the Colombian Army.

The liberating army, whose central nucleus are the infantry battalions of Rifles, Voltígeros, Vencedores, the British Legion, plus the contingents of the lancers Bravos de Apure of General José Antonio Páez, and whose contingents are made up mainly of Colombian-Venezuelan troops under the supreme leadership of Bolívar, are now waging the Venezuelan campaign as part of Gran Colombia. On 24 June 1821, the Republicans obtained a decisive victory over the Royalists in the battle at Campo de Carabobo, and today is celebrated as the day of the Venezuelan Army.

After the Battle of Carabobo, the remnants of the Royalist armies that managed to escape from the battlefield took refuge in Puerto Cabello, while in the east they did the same in Cumaná. Cumaná was taken shortly after by the Republicans, but the heavily fortified city of Puerto Cabello resisted under siege until 1823, during which time it served as the base for the Spanish reconquest of territories in western Venezuela.

Afterwards, these troops take part in the Southern Campaign under the command of Marshal Antonio José de Sucre, and went on to liberate Ecuador in the Battle of Pichincha, Peru in the Battle of Junín, and Alto Peru (today Bolivia) in the Battle of Ayacucho.

=== 19th century ===
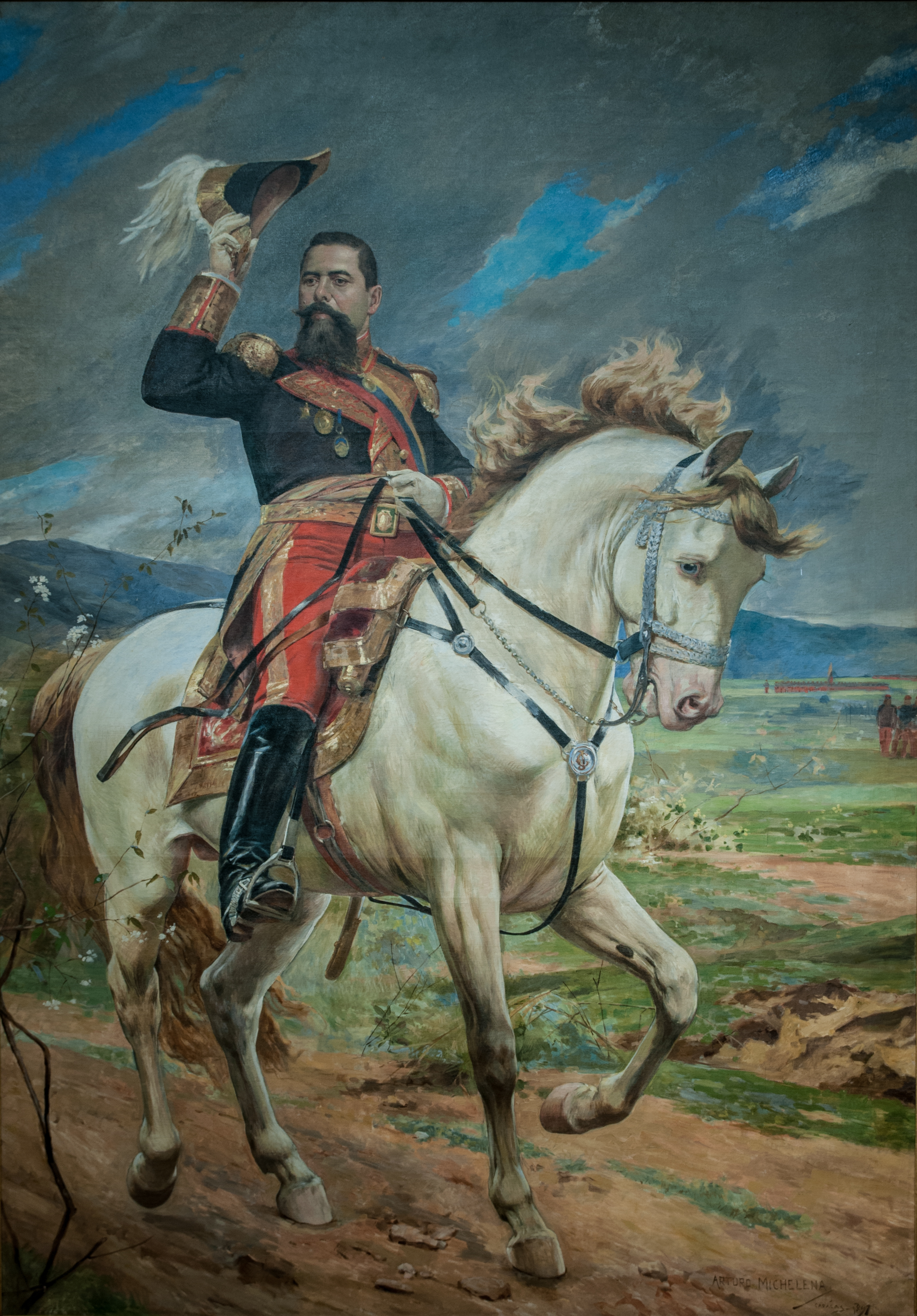
An equestrian portrait of General Joaquin Crespo, by Arturo Michelena 1897.

After the army fought in the Gran Colombia–Peru War (1828-1829), and once Venezuela separated from Gran Colombia in 1830, the country went through periods of great instability and civil wars throughout the 19th century, which led to the end of the professional army and in its place emerged the figure of the regional leader (caudillo) who organized their montoneras (irregular militia) to fight in internal civil wars.

This precarious situation ended when in 1899 Cipriano Castro took power as president and once again lays the foundations for a professional army, which his successor Juan Vicente Gómez deepens.

=== 20th century ===
The army followed a growing line of modernization and professionalization throughout the 20th century, under the Prussian model. After the death of Gómez and the instability that followed, the army took sides in the politics of the time, with a dominance of militaristic sectors in the country's politics in the period 1940-1958, with the army carrying out three coups d'état in 1945, 1948 and in 1958 ending the dictatorship of General Marcos Pérez Jiménez, within the framework of the Cold War.

With the overthrow of the Pérez Jiménes and the return to democracy, the most significant actions that involved the army were the combat of the Marxist-Leninist guerrillas of the Armed Forces of National Liberation (Fuerzas Armadas de Liberación Nacional, FALN), made up of activists from the Communist Party of Venezuela and the Revolutionary Left Movement (Movimiento de Izquierda Revolucionaria, MIR) that were heavily active throughout the 60's; as well as the deployment of Venezuelan troops in the ONUCA peacekeeping mission in Nicaragua.

Other missions undertaken by the army where the repression of looting of private property during the "Caracazo" protests in February 1989 and the failed coups by future president Colonel Hugo Chávez in April and November 1992.

=== 21st century ===
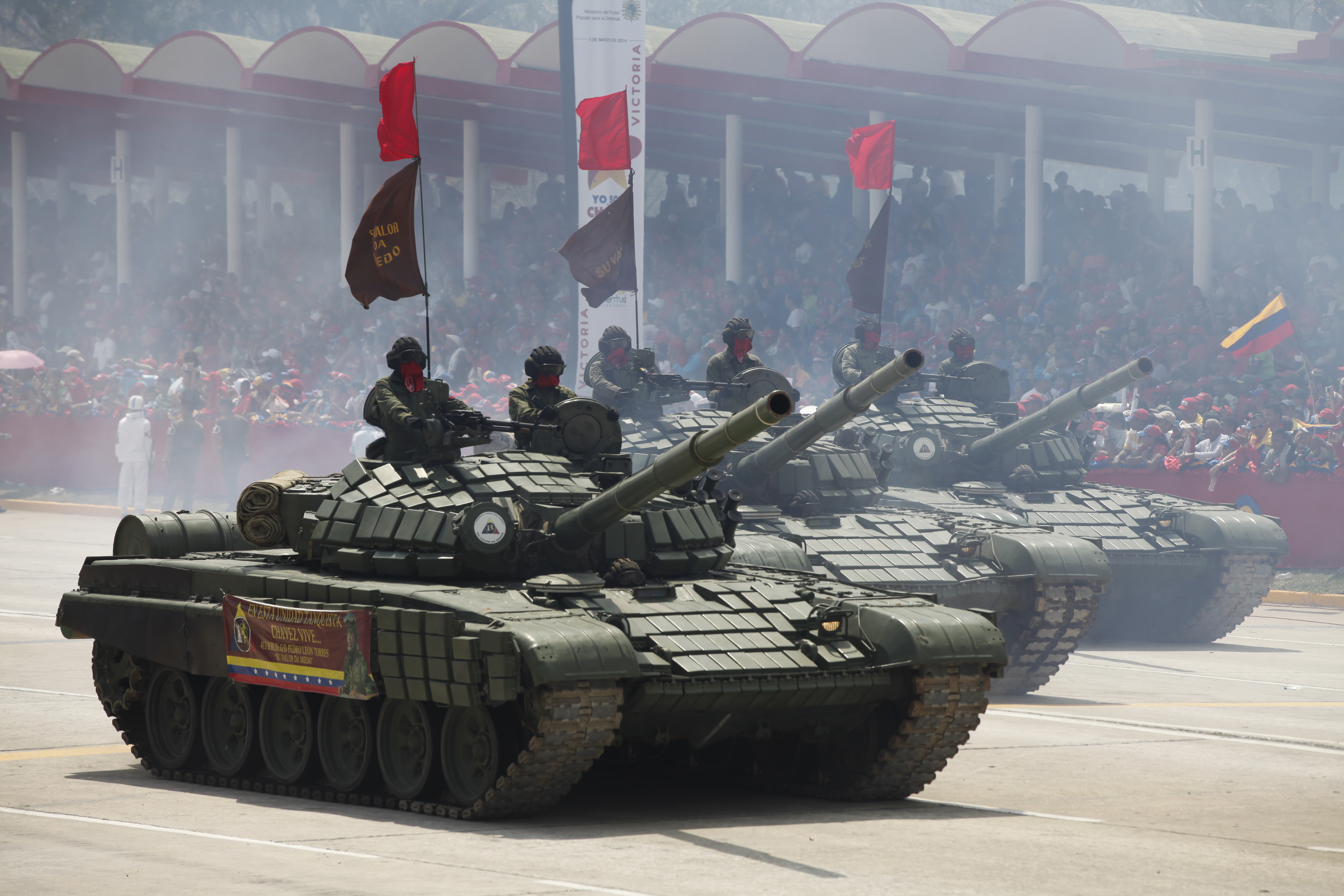
T-72B1V tanks of the Venezuelan Army during a parade in homage to the death of former president Hugo Chávez, March 2014.

In the 21st century, the Venezuelan Army has experienced unprecedented growth, incorporating a big influx of material – mostly from Russia – in almost all segments of its arsenal, leading to the modernization of the force. In the last three decades, it has had to face the spillover into Venezuela of the Colombian internal conflict; and sometimes being put on alert due to tensions between Caracas and Bogotá.

The National Bolivarian Armed Forces of Venezuela is the 4th largest military in Latin America, behind Brazil, Colombia and Mexico.

== Mission and vision ==
Its mission, as the ground forces of the National Bolivarian Armed Forces of Venezuela, is to:

- Secure the ground defenses of the nation,
- Contribute to the establishment of democratic institutions and build up respect and full compliance to the laws of the Republic as mandated,
- Support national development and integration,
- And to participate in programs of international cooperation and peacekeeping.

== Functions of the Army ==
In accordance with the Article 9 of the National Armed Forces Organic Law as amended, the functions of the Army are to

- Organize, train and equip units for ground forces operations
- Establish doctrines for the various operations it has to undertake
- Participate in military mobilization programs
- Maintain the national borders
- And actively achieve readiness to develop technologies and scientific advances for the advancement of national defense

== Officer education ==
The command officers, troop officers, technical service officers and military surgeons belonging to the Venezuelan Army are graduates of the military academies of the Bolivarian Military University of Venezuela and are commissioned with the rank of Second Lieutenant. The academies are as follows:

- Military Academy of the Bolivarian Army,
- Military Academy of Troop Officers C-in-C Hugo Rafael Chávez Frías,
- Bolivarian Military Technical Academy,
- Military Academy of Health Sciences

Unlike most of the officer corps the sergeants (professional NCOs) and recruits completing basic training and Army officer candidates of civilian background, study in separate schools.

== Official hymn ==
=== Spanish lyrics ===
Chorus

Adelante marchemos, valientes, al combate y al rudo fragor
por la patria muy altas las frentes, despleguemos pujanza y valor.
Por la patria muy altas las frentes, despleguemos pujanza y valor.

Nuestra sangre es la savia del pueblo y en el pueblo se plasma en canción
es la rosa más pura del viento que en la historia da brillo a la acción,
En las aguas, el aire y la tierra la victoria es el alba inmortal,
si sublime es el triunfo en la guerra, preservemos la gloria y la paz.

Chorus

Y si el brazo extranjero se atreve a infamar de este suelo el honor
antes muerte mil veces nos llegue que rendirnos al torpe invasor,
pues de todas las patrias que el cielo diera al hombre en morada de amor,
es la nuestra el más hondo desvelo en el sueño de un mundo mejor.

Chorus

== Organization ==
The Venezuelan Army is divided into 4 main commands and 6 army divisions as well as other independent units reporting to Headquarters, Venezuelan Army. The Army's Air Defense Artillery Brigades also report directly, as part of the Venezuelan Air Force Air Defense Forces Command, to the Operational Strategic Command for national defense purposes in air defense matters.

=== Army major commands ===
==== Army General Command ====
- Army Headquarters
- Army HQ Escort and Security Battalion "Lieutenant General Daniel Florence O'Leary"
- Army General Staff
- Army Inspector General's Office

==== Army Logistics Command ====
- Command HQ
- Command HQ Company
- Inspectoriate General
- Adjutant General's Corps
- Acquisitions Office
- Army Ministers Reception Center
- Army Armaments Corps
- Army Intendancy
- Army Medical Department
- Army Transportation Corps
- Army Communications Corps
- Army Engineers Service
- 82nd Logistics Support Regiment
- 83rd Logistics Support Command
- 84th Logistics Support Command

==== Army Aviation Command ====
- Command HQ
- Command, Service and Logistics Company
- Helicopter Battalion
- Fixed Wing Air Battalion
- Special Reconnaissance Battalion
- Multipurpose Helicopter Battalion
- Army Aviation Maintenance Center
- Army Aviation School
- Army Aviation Center of Administration
- Army Aviation Flight Simulation and Instruction Center

==== Special Forces ====
99th Army Special Operations Brigade

=== Army divisions and corps ===
==== 1st Infantry Division ====
- HQ Battalion
- 11th Armored Brigade "Brigadier Pedro Ruiz Rondon"
  - Brigade HQ
  - 1st Battalion Combat Team (Mot.)
  - 111th Armor Battalion
  - 112th Armor Infantry Battalion
  - 113th Armor Battalion
  - 114th Armor Battalion
  - 115th Field Artillery Battalion
  - 116th Air Defense Artillery Battalion
  - 1103rd Reconnisance Squadron
- 12th Caribbean Ranger Brigade
  - Brigade HQ
  - 121st Infantry Battalion "Venezuela"
  - 122nd Ranger Battalion
  - 123rd Ranger Battalion
  - 124th Field Artillery Battalion
- 13th Infantry Brigade
  - Brigade HQ
    - 131st Infantry Battalion
    - 132nd Infantry Battalion
    - 133rd Infantry Battalion
    - 135th Field Artillery Battalion "Battle of Lake Maracaibo"
    - 136th Air Defense Artillery Battalion
- 14th Mechanized Infantry Brigade
  - Brigade HQ
  - 141st Infantry Battalion
  - 143rd Infantry Battalion
  - 145th Field Artillery Battalion
  - 146th Air Defense Artillery Battalion
- 19th Western Air Defense Artillery Brigade
- 105th Combat Engineers Battalion

==== 2nd Infantry Division ====
- HQ Battalion
- 21st Motorized Infantry Brigade
  - Brigade HQ
  - 3rd Battalion Combat Team (Mech.)
  - 211th Infantry Battalion "COL Antonio Ricaurte"
  - 212th Infantry Battalion "Carabobo"
  - 213th Infantry Battalion
  - 215th Field Artillery Battalion
- 22nd Mountain Infantry Brigade
  - Brigade HQ
  - 221st Infantry Battalion
  - 222nd Infantry Battalion
  - 2205th Mortar Battery (Mountain)
- 23rd Development and Security Brigade
- 24th Infantry Brigade
- 25th Mechanized Infantry Brigade
  - Brigade HQ
  - 251st Infantry Battalion
  - 253rd Infantry Battalion
  - 225th Field Artillery Battalion
- 29th Plains Air Defense Artillery Brigade
- 205th Divisional Combat Engineering Battalion
- Military Police Company

The 79th Andes Air Defense Artillery Brigade reports directly to the Operational Strategic Command, while being in the 2ID's territorial jurisdiction.

==== 3rd Infantry Division ====
- HQ Battalion
- 31st Mechanized Infantry Brigade Group "Major General Lucas Carvajal"
  - Brigade HQ
  - 311th Armor Infantry Battalion "Simon Bolivar"
  - 312th Armored Cavalry Squadron "Juan Pablo Ayala"
  - 316th Air Defense Artillery Battalion
- 32nd Caribbean Ranger Brigade "General-in-Chief José Antonio Páez"
  - Brigade HQ
  - 321st Ranger Battalion
  - 322nd Ranger Battalion
  - 323rd Ranger Battalion
  - 325th Field Artillery Battalion (Ranger)
- 33rd Signals Brigade
- 34th Signals Brigade (activated 2016)
  - Brigade HQ
    - 341st Signals Battalion
    - 342nd Signals Battalion
    - 343rd Signals Battalion
    - 344th Signals Battalion
    - 345th Signals Battalion
    - 346th Signals Battalion
    - 347th Signals Battalion
- 35th Military Police Brigade "General Jose de San Martin"
  - Brigade HQ
    - 351st MP Battalion
    - 352nd MP Battalion
    - 353rd MP Battalion
    - 354th MP Battalion (Replacement and Training Battalion)
- 39th Central Air Defense Artillery Brigade "Colonel Juan Perez Ovalles"
- 305th Combat Engineers Battalion

Since 2016 the newly created 34th CCB reports also to the Operational Strategic Command.

==== 4th Armored Division ====
- HQ Battalion
- 41st Armored Brigade
  - Brigade HQ
  - 2nd Battalion Combat Team (Mixed)
  - 411th Armor Infantry Battalion "Major General Jose Antonio Anzoategui"
  - 412th Armor Battalion "Major General Jose Francisco Bermudez"
  - 413th Armor Battalion "Brigadier Pedro León Torres"
  - 414th Armor Battalion "Apure Braves"
  - 415th Field Artillery Battalion (Mixed) "Major General Juan Jacinto Lara"
  - 416th Air Defense Artillery Battalion (MANPAD & Towed) "Lieutenant Colonel Alejandro Salazar"
  - 4012nd Armored Reconnisance Troop "Sacred Cavalry Squadron"
- 42nd Airborne Brigade "Aragua"
  - Brigade HQ
  - 421st Parachute Infantry Battalion "José Leonardo Chirinos"
  - 422nd Parachute Infantry Battalion "Colonel Antonio Nicolas Briceno"
  - 423rd Parachute Infantry Battalion "Colonel Ramon Garcia de Sena"
  - Sniper Company
- 43rd Field Artillery Brigade "Grand Marshal of Ayacucho Antonio Jose de Sucre"
  - Brigade HQ
  - 431st Field Artillery Battalion (Self-Propelled)
  - 432nd Field Artillery Battalion (Self-Propelled) "General in Chief & President Ciprano Castro"
  - 433rd Field Artillery Battalion (Multiple Rocket Launcher)
  - 434th Field Artillery Battalion (Multiple Rocket Launcher)
  - 435th Field Artillery Battalion (Multiple Rocket Launcher) "Colonel Juan Vicente Bolivar"
- 44th Light Armored Brigade
- 49th Air Defense Artillery Brigade
- 402nd Anti-tank Artillery Battalion "Major General Ezequiel Zamora"
- 405th Combat Engineers Battalion
- Combat Training Center "Lieutenant General Gabriel Laurencio Silva"

==== 5th Jungle Infantry Division ====
- HQ Battalion
- 5002th Maintenance and Services Coy.
- 51st Jungle Infantry Brigade
  - Brigade HQ
  - 511th Infantry Battalion (Jungle)
  - 512th Infantry Battalion (Jungle)
  - 513th Infantry Battalion (Jungle)
  - 5102nd Reconnisance Company
  - 5105th Mortar Battery (Jungle)
- 52nd Jungle Infantry Brigade
  - Brigade HQ
  - 521st Infantry Battalion (Jungle)
  - 522nd Infantry Battalion (Jungle)
  - 5202nd Cavalry Troop
- 53rd Jungle Infantry Brigade
  - Brigade HQ
  - 531st Infantry Battalion (Jungle)
  - 532nd Infantry Battalion (Jungle)
  - 533rd Infantry Battalion (Jungle)
  - 5302nd Cavalry Troop
- 59th Air Defense Artillery Brigade
- 505th Combat Engineers Battalion
- 508th Service Support Battalion
- 507th Communications Battalion

==== 9th Cavalry Division ====
- Division HQ
- HQ Squadron
- 91st Armored Cavalry Brigade "Major General Pedro Perez Delgado"
  - Brigade HQ
  - HQ Troop
  - 911th Armored Cavalry Squadron "Brigadier Ambrosio Plaza"
  - 912th Armored Cavalry Squadron
  - 913th Armored Cavalry Squadron
- 92nd Caribbean Ranger Brigade
  - Brigade HQ
  - 921st Ranger Battalion
  - 922nd Armor Battalion "Victors of Araure" (Ranger)
  - 923rd Ranger Battalion
  - 926th Field Artillery Battalion "Battle of Ayacucho" (Ranger)
  - 927th Air Defense Artillery Battalion
  - 9202nd Cavalry Troop
- 93rd Caribbean Ranger Brigade (Mechanized)
  - Brigade HQ
  - 931st Infantry Battalion
  - 932nd Ranger Battalion
  - 933rd Ranger Battalion
  - 934th Infantry Battalion
  - 937th Ranger Battalion
  - 9302nd Cavalry Troop
- 94th Brigade Combat Team
- 905th Combat Engineers Battalion
- UAV Battalion "Apure Patriots"

==== 6th Corps of Engineers ====
- Corps HQ
- HQ Battalion
- 61st Engineers Training Brigade
  - Brigade HQ
  - 611th Engineer Battalion
  - 612th Engineer Training Battalion
  - 613th Engineer Training Battalion
  - 614th Engineer Training Battalion
- 62nd Construction and Maintenance Regiment
  - Regiment HQ
  - 621st Engineer Training Battalion
  - 622nd Engineer Battalion
- 63rd Construction and Maintenance Regiment
  - Regiment HQ
  - 631st Engineer Battalion
  - 632nd Engineer Training Battalion
- 64th Railroad Engineering Brigade
  - Brigade HQ
  - 641st Railroad Engineer Battalion
  - 642nd Railroad Engineer Battalion
  - 643rd Railroad Engineer Battalion

== Ranks ==
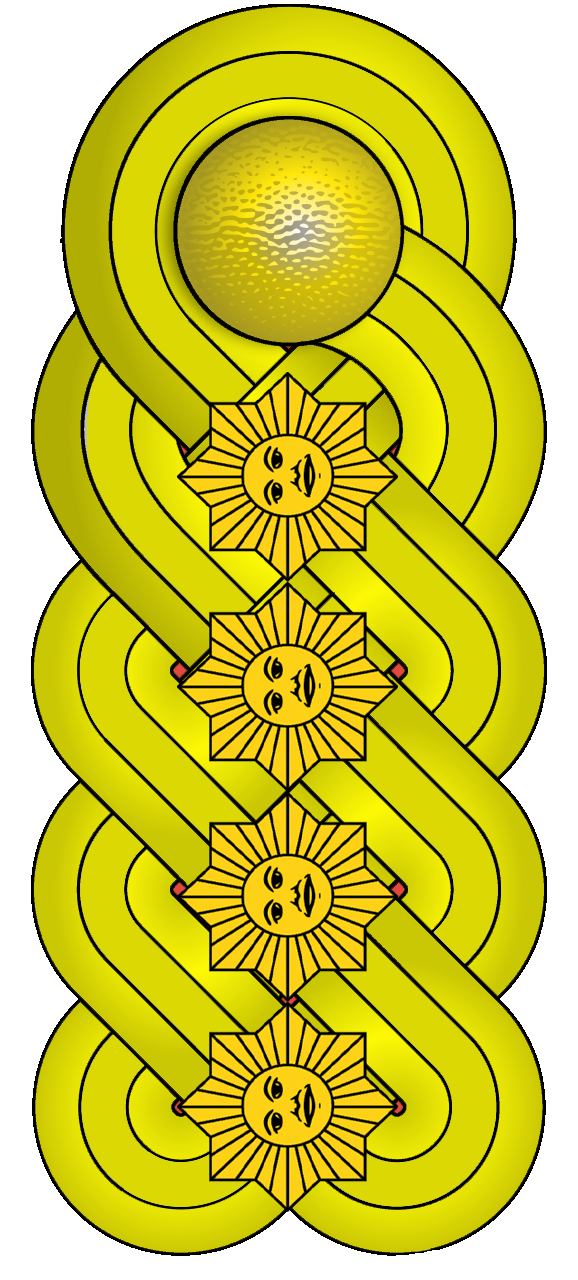
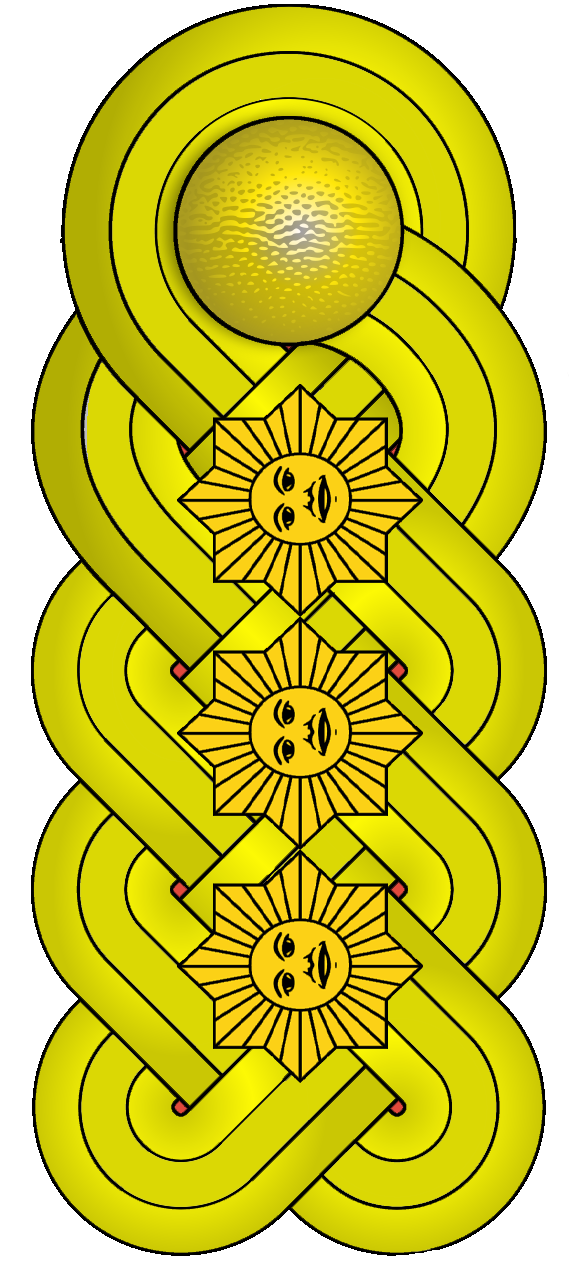
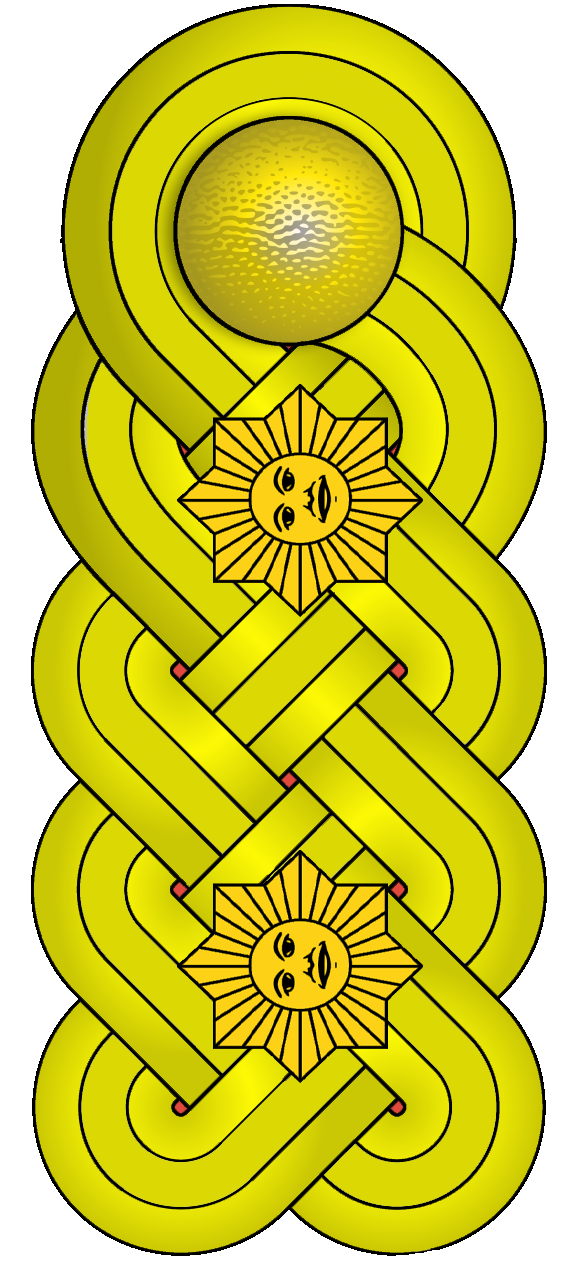
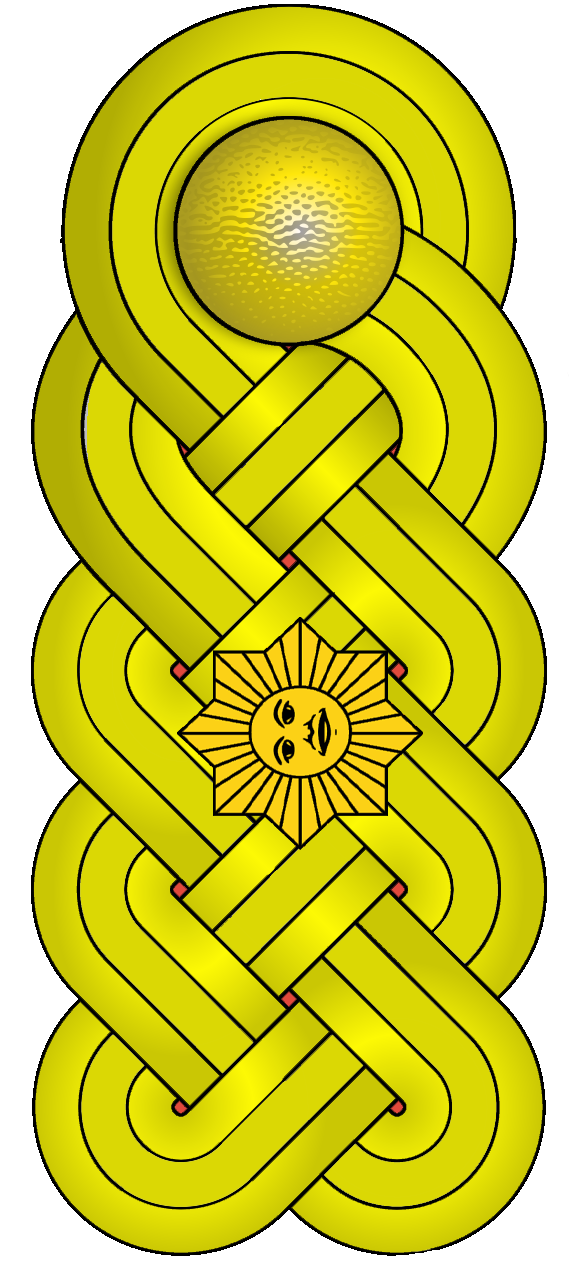
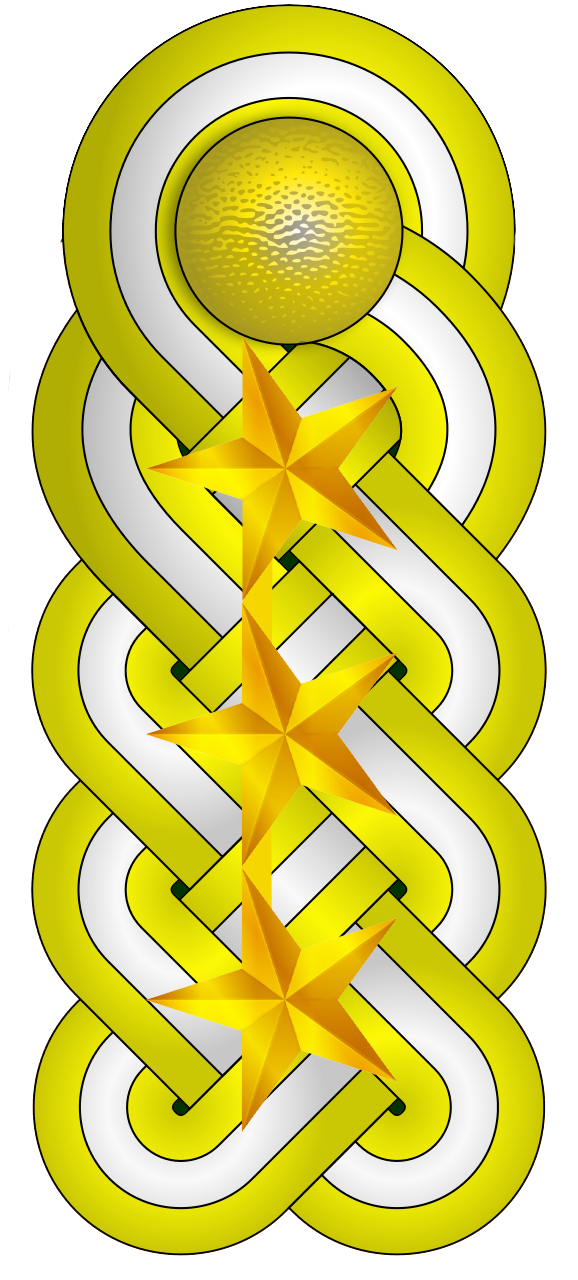
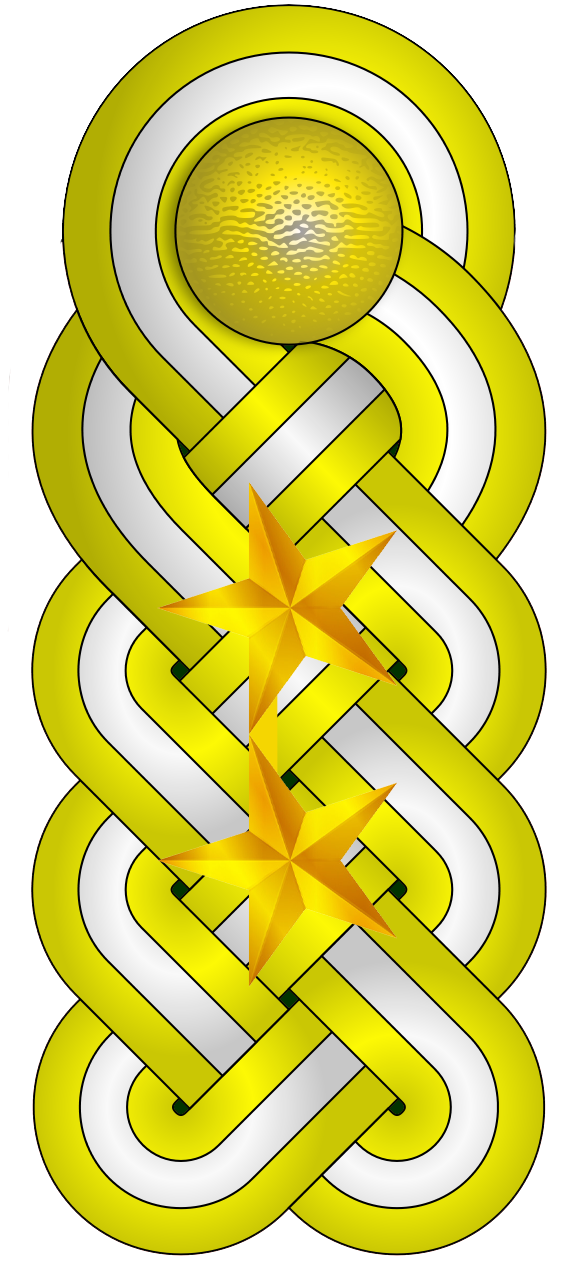
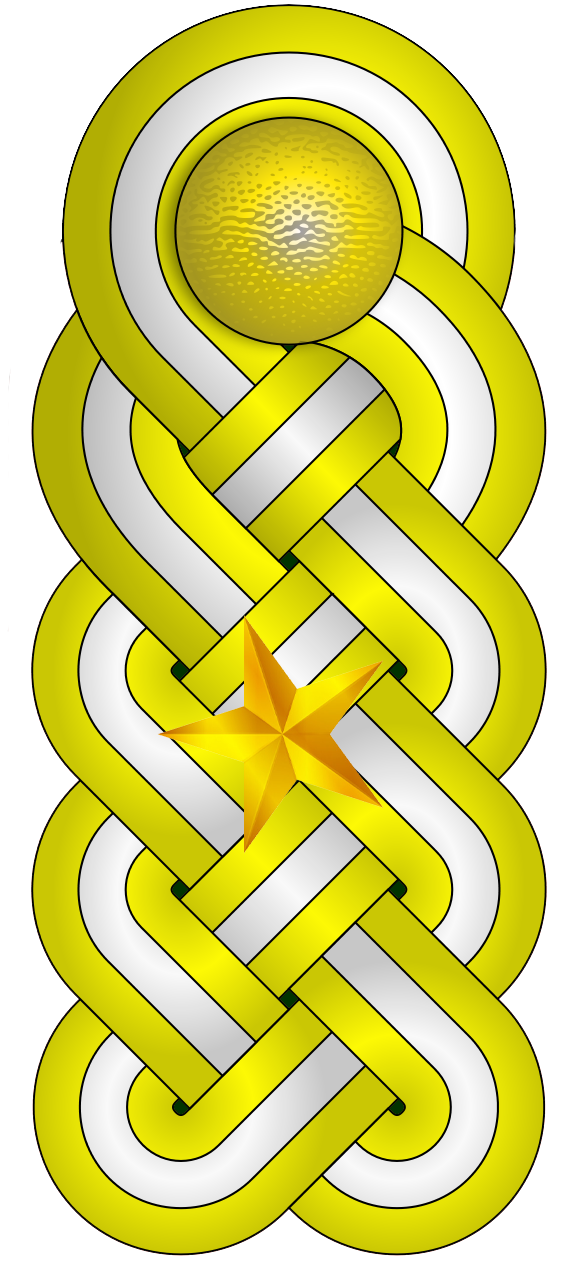
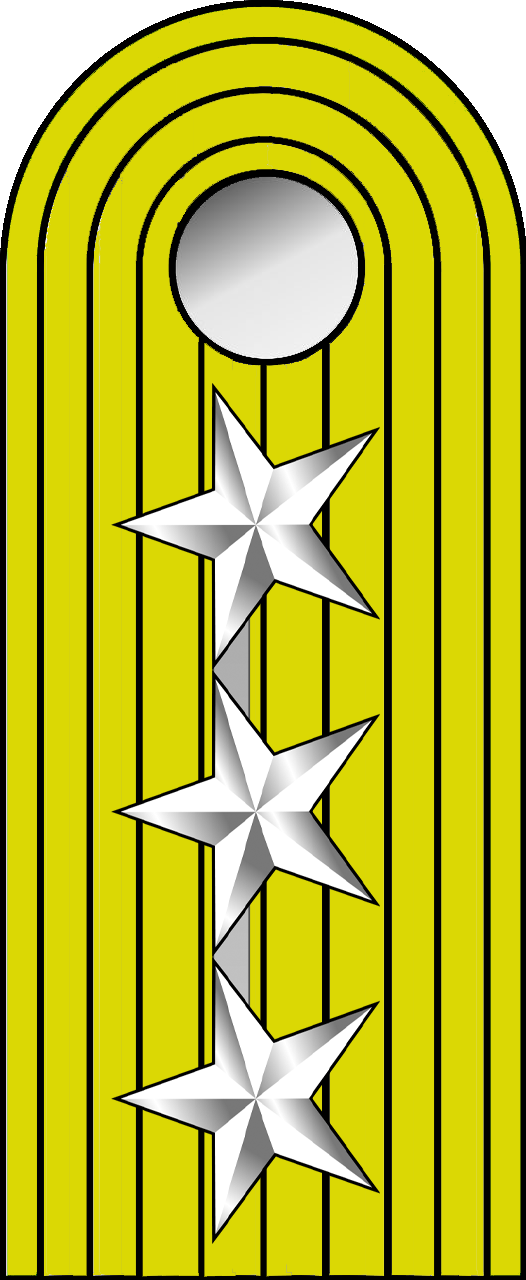
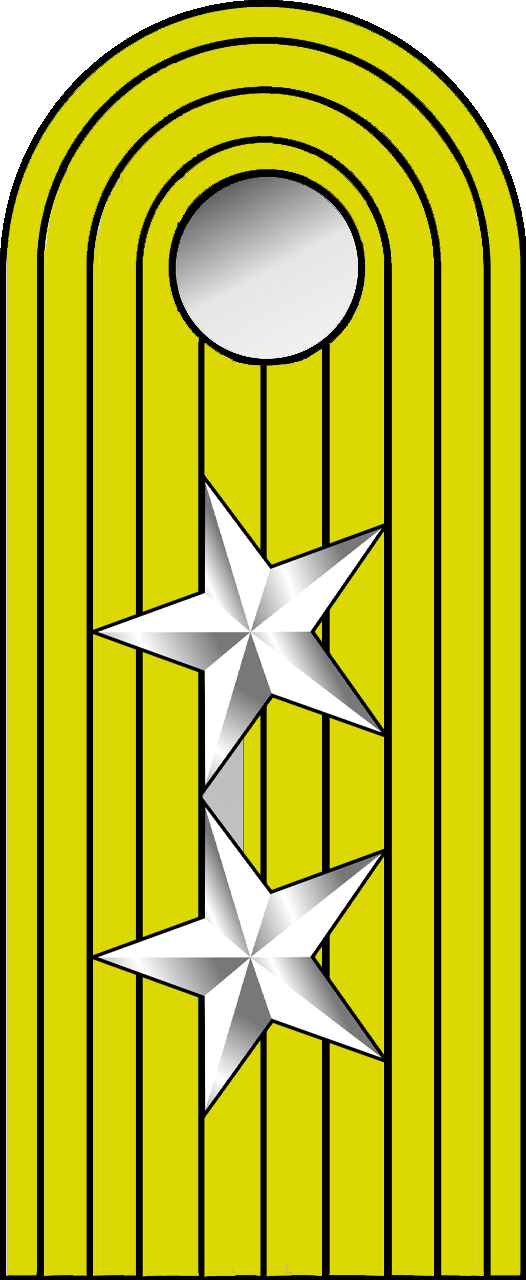
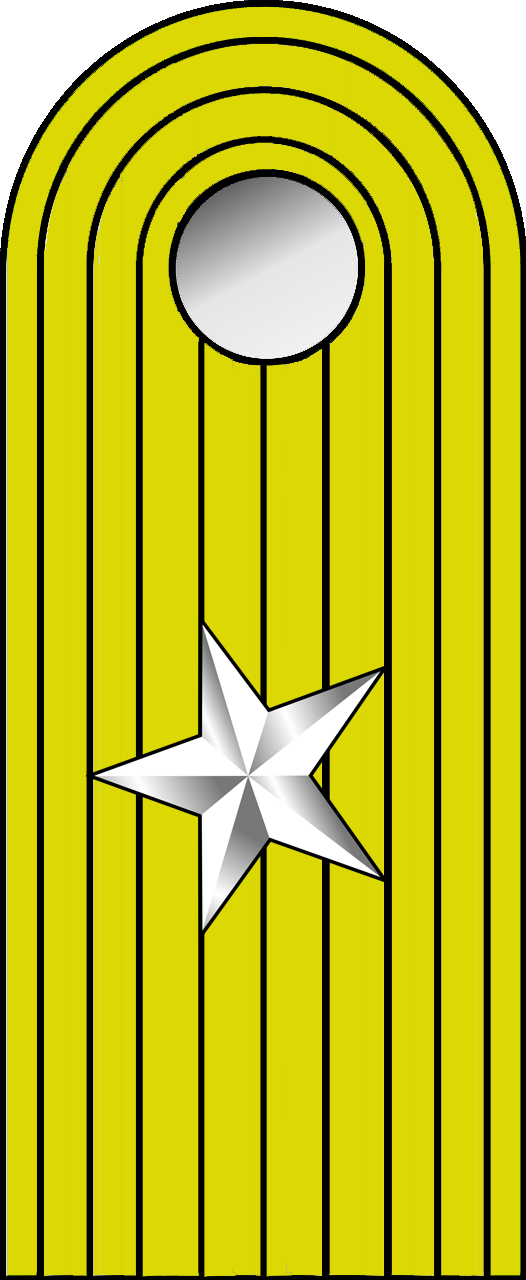
Rank group	General / flag officers				Senior officers			Junior officers
Venezuelan Army
Venezuelan Army	General en jefe	Mayor general	General de division	General de brigada	Coronel	Teniente coronel	Mayor	Capitán	Primer teniente	Teniente

Technical Non-commissioned officers and Warrant officers (Army shoulder boards)
Sargento Técnico de Tercera (Junior Warrant Officer)	Sargento Técnico de Segunda	Sargento Técnico de Primera (Third Warrant Officer)	Maestro Técnico de Tercera (Second Warrant Officer)	Maestro Técnico de Segunda (First Warrant Officer)	Maestro Técnico de Primera	Maestro Técnico Mayor	Maestro Técnico Supervisor (Chief Warrant Officer)

Rank group	Senior NCOs							Junior NCOs		Enlisted
Venezuelan Army											No insignia
Venezuelan Army	Sargento supervisor	Sargento ayudante	Sargento mayor de primera	Sargento mayor de segunda	Sargento mayor de tercera	Sargento primero	Sargento segundo	Cabo primero	Cabo segundo	Distinguido	Soldado raso

== Commanding Generals of the Army ==
Commanding Generals of the Venezuelan Army
Commanding General	Term in office
MGEN Francisco Rodríguez del Toro	April 1810– July 1811
Generalissimo Francisco de Miranda	Jul 1811 – Aug. 1812
Office of Commanding General of the Army was vacant from 1812 to January 1813.
GEN Santiago Mariño	Jan. 1813 – Jun. 1813
GEN Simón Bolívar (first term)	May 1813 – Dec 1814
Office of Commanding General of the Army was vacant from December 1814 to May 1815.
General in Chief José Tadeo Monagas	May 1815
Office of Commanding General of the Army was vacant from May 1815 to May 1816.
GEN Simón Bolívar (second term)	May 1816 – Aug. 1821
GEN Carlos Soublette	Ago. 1821 – Dic. 1822
GEN José Antonio Páez	Dec. 1822 – Jan 1847
General in Chief José Tadeo Monagas (2nd term)	May 1847 – May 1858
GEN Santiago Mariño (acting)	Jun 1848 – August 1848
GEN Julián Castro	March 1858 – August 1859 (acting till May 1858)
GEN Pedro E. Ramos	Aug 1859 – Dec 1859
GEN León de Febres Cordero	Dec 1859 – May 1861
GEN José Antonio Páez (2nd term)	May 1861 – Jul 1863
GEN Juan Crisóstomo Falcón	Jul. 1863 – April 1868
GEN León Colina (acting)	1864
GEN Antonio Guzmán Blanco (acting)	1866
GEN Manuel Ezequiel Bruzual	April 1868 – Jul. 1868
GEN José Tadeo Monagas (3rd term)	Jul. 1868 – Nov. 1868
GEN Juan Antonio Sotillo	Nov. 1868 – May 1869
GEN José Ruperto Monagas	May 1869 – April 1870
GEN Antonio Guzmán Blanco (2nd term)	April 1870 – Feb. 1877
GEN Francisco Linares Alcántara	Feb. 1877 – Feb. 1879
GEN José Gregorio Valera	Nov. 1878 – Feb. 1879 (acting till early February 1879)
GEN José Gregorio Cedeño	Feb. 1879 (acting, served 12 days)
GEN Antonio Guzmán Blanco (3rd term)	Feb. 1879 – May 1884
GEN Joaquín Crespo	May 1884 – April 1886
GEN Antonio Guzmán Blanco (4th term)	April 1886 – August 1887
GEN Hermógenes López	August 1887 – June 1888
Doctor Juan Pablo Rojas Paúl	Jul. 1888 – Mar. 1890
Doctor Raimundo Andueza Palacio	Mar. 1890 – Oct. 1892
GEN Joaquín Crespo (2nd term)	Oct. 1892 – Feb. 1898
LTGEN Ignacio Andrade	Feb. 1898 – Oct. 1899
LTGEN Cipriano Castro	Oct. 1899 – Nov. 1908
LTGEN Juan Vicente Gómez	Nov. 1908 – Dec. 1935
LTGEN Eleazar López Contreras	Dec. 1935 – May 1941
MGEN Isaías Medina Angarita	May 1941 – Oct 1945
LTCOL Carlos Delgado Chalbaud	Oct. 1945 – Nov. 1948
LTCOL (later COL, BRIG and MGEN) Marcos Pérez Jiménez	Nov. 1948 – Aug 1954
BRIG Hugo Fuentes	Aug 1954 – Dec. 1957
BRIG Rafael Virgilio Vivas	Dec. 1957 – Jan. 1958
Office of Commanding General of the Army was vacant from January 1958 to January 1959.
BRIG Marco A. Moros A.	Jan 1959 – Feb. 1960
MGEN Pedro J. Quevedo D.	Feb. 1960 – Jul. 1964
BRIG Pablo A. Flores A.	Jul. 1964 – Ene. 1968
MGEN Roberto Morean Soto	Ene. 1968 – Feb. 1970
MGEN Víctor M. Maldonado	Feb. 1970 – Sep. 1971
MGEN Homero I. Leal T.	Sep. 1971 – Feb. 1973
BRIG Juan Manuel Sucre Figarella	Feb. 1973 – April 1974
MGEN Manuel I. Bereciartu P.	Apr. 1974 – Oct. 1975
MGEN Víctor M. Molino V.	Oct. 1975 – Jun. 1977
MGEN Ernesto Brandt T.	Jun. 1977 -Jun. 1978
MGEN Arnaldo Castro	Jun. 1978 – May 1979
MGEN Ángel V. Berrio Brito	May 1979 – Jun. 1979
MGEN Tomás Abreu R.	Jun. 1979 – Jan. 1980
MGen Rafael G. Marín. G.	Jan. 1980 – Jun. 1981
MGEN Vicente L. Narváez O.	Jun. 1981 – Jun. 1982
MGEN Luis Octavio Romero	Jun. 1982 – Jun. 1983
MGEN Luís J. Silva Tirado	Jun. 1983 – Jun. 1984
MGEN José A. Olavarría	Jun. 1984 – Jun. 1985
MGEN José Humberto Vivas	Jun. 1985 – Jun. 1986
MGEN Elidoro A. Guerrero	Jun. 1986 – Jun. 1987
MGEN Italo del Valle Alliegro	Jun. 1987 – Jun. 1988
MGEN José María Troconis Peraza	Jun. 1988 – Jun. 1989
MGEN Carlos J. Peñaloza Z.	Jun. 1989 – Jun. 1991
MGEN Pedro. R. Rangel R.	Jun. 1991 – Jun. 1993
MGEN Jorge I. Tagliaferro De Lima	Jun. 1993 – Jan 1994
MGEN Moisés A. Orozco Graterol	Feb 1994 – Dec 1994
Office of Commanding General of the Army was vacant from December 1994 to July 2026.
MGEN Pedro N. Valencia V.	Jan. 1995 – Jul. 1996
MGEN Pedro Hernández G.	Jul. 1996 – Jul. 1997
MGEN Wilfredo J. Guerrero Z.	Jun. 1997 – Jul. 1998
MGEN Rubén M. Rojas Pérez	Jul. 1998 – Feb. 1999
MGEN Noel E. Martínez Ochoa	Feb. 1999 – Aug. 1999
MGEN Lucas Rincón Romero*	Aug. 1999 – Jun. 2001
MGEN Víctor A. Cruz Weffer	Jun. 2001 – Dec 2001
BRIG (later MGEN) Efraín Vásquez Velasco	Dec. 2001 – Apr. 2002
MGEN Julio J. García Montoya	April 2002 – Jan. 2003
MGEN Jorge Luis García Carneiro*	Jan. 2003 – Jan. 2004
MGEN Raúl Isaías Baduel*	Jan. 2004 – July 2006
MGEN Pedro Azuaje Apitz	July 2006 – Jul. 2007
LTGEN Carlos José Mata Figueroa*	July 2007 – Mar. 2009
MGEN Juan Vicente Paredes Torrealba	Mar. 2009 – July 2010
MGEN Euclides Campos Aponte	July 2010 – July 2012
MGEN Carlos Alcalá Cordones	July 2012 – July 2013
MGEN Alexis Ascension López Ramírez	July 2012 – July 2014
MGEN Gerardo Izquierdo Torres	July 2014– July 2015
MGEN Juan de Jesús García Toussaintt	July 2015 – June 2017
MGEN Jesús Rafael Suárez Chourio*	June 2017 – July 2019
MGEN Alexis Rodriguez Cabello	July 2019 – July 2020
MGEN Domingo Hernández Lárez*	July 2020 – July 2021
MGEN Félix Osorio	July 2021 – July 2023
MGEN José Murga Baptista	July 2023 – Oct. 2024
MGEN Johan Alexander Hernández Lárez	Oct. 2024 – July. 2026

(*): Marks promotion to the rank of full General (and appointment as Minister of Defense) after serving term as Commanding General of the Army
