= Domingo Esguerra Plata =

Colombian lawyer and diplomat (1875–1965)

Colombia Ambassador to the United Kingdom
- In office 28 June 1948 – 7 June 1950
- President: Mariano Ospina Pérez
- Preceded by: Darío Echandía Olaya
- Succeeded by: Rafael Sánchez Amaya

Minister of Foreign Affairs
- In office 5 May 1947 – 21 March 1948
- President: Mariano Ospina Pérez
- Preceded by: Luis López de Mesa
- Succeeded by: Laureano Gómez

Colombia Ambassador to Brazil
- In office 27 December 1938 – 16 January 1940
- President: Eduardo Santos Montejo
- Preceded by: Position established
- Succeeded by: Carlos Lozano y Lozano

Envoy Extraordinary and Minister Plenipotentiary of Colombia to Brazil
- In office 8 December 1936 – 27 December 1938
- President: Alfonso López Pumarejo
- Succeeded by: Position abolished

Envoy Extraordinary and Minister Plenipotentiary of Colombia to Japan
- In office 28 April 1934 – 4 September 1936
- President: Enrique Olaya Herrera
- Succeeded by: Alfredo Michelsen Mantilla

Minister of Finance and Treasury
- In office 26 May 1909 – 10 June 1909
- President: Rafael Reyes Prieto
- Preceded by: Nemesio Camacho Macías
- Succeeded by: Fidel Cano Gutiérrez

Personal details
- Born: 28 March 1875 Santana, Tolima, United States of Colombia
- Died: 1965 (aged 89–90) Bogotá, D.C., Colombia
- Party: Liberal
- Spouse(s): Paulina Rueda Vargas (m. 1908; died 1946) Susana Flórez Mariño (m. 1948)
- Children: none
- Parents: Domingo Esguerra Ortiz (father); Dolores Plata Bernal (mother)
- Education: Republican University of Colombia (JD, 1896)

Domingo Esguerra Plata (28 March 1875 – 1965) was a Colombian lawyer who served as Minister of Foreign Affairs of Colombia, Ambassador of Colombia to Brazil, and Ambassador of Colombia to the United Kingdom.

== Career ==
Graduated Juris Doctor from Universidad Repúblicana in Bogotá (now the Free University of Colombia) on 26 June 1896, his graduate thesis La Doctrina Monroe was a comprehensive account of the Monroe Doctrine and was held in high regard by his contemporaries.

On 4 September 1906, Esguerra was named First Secretary of the Colombian Legation in United Kingdom of Great Britain and Ireland working under Ignacio Gutiérrez Ponce, the Colombian Envoy to His Britanic Majesty's Government. On 8 October 1908, he was promoted to the rank of Counselor ad honorem, but was instead transferred a few days later on 13 October to the legation in the German Empire still maintaining the same rank, this was at the behest of his friend Gutiérrez who now served as Envoy to His Germanic Imperial and Royal Majesty's Government.

He returned to Colombia in the early months of 1909, and was named Colombian Minister of Finance and Treasury by President Rafael Reyes Prieto in replacement of Nemesio Camacho Macías for a very short period, the appointed was intended to fulfill protocol as President Reyes's term ended a few weeks later. The next year, Esguerra was named Financial Agent of the diplomatic missions in Europe at London. With the inauguration of the League of Nations in Geneva, Esguerra was named Counselor of the Colombian Legation to the First Conference of the League of Nations on 16 January 1920. In 1922, he returns to London this time as Consul General.

For his exemplary conduct and diplomatic labour in the name of Colombia, Esguerra was awarded the Order of the Sacred Treasure by the Government of Japan, the Order of the Southern Cross by the Government of Brazil, the Order of the Liberator by the Government of Venezuela, the Order of Merit by the Government of Ecuador, and the Order of Boyacá by his own, the Government of Colombia. He was also a member and 3 times President of the Sociedad Bolivariana de Colombia, and an Honorary Member of the Real Academia de Jurisprudencia y Legislación of Madrid.

In October 1933 he was appointed as the 1st Envoy Extraordinary and Minister Plenipotentiary of Colombia to Japan by President Enrique Olaya Herrera with the mission of establishing direct diplomatic ties with The Land of the Rising Sun. He travelled from London to Washington, D.C. to meet his colleague Fabio Lozano Torrijos, Envoy Extraordinary and Minister Plenipotentiary of Colombia to the United States and afterwards travelled to Montreal where he travelled by train to Vancouver and sailed off to Japan by way of Honolulu. He arrived to the port of Yokohama, Japan on 20 April 1934 and travelled from there to Tokyo, where on 28 April 1934 he presented his Letters of Credence to Emperor Hirohito.

== Personal life ==
Born 28 March 1875 in the town of Santana de las Lajas (now Falán) then part of the State of Tolima, United States of Colombia. His parents were Domingo Esguerra Ortiz and Dolores Plata Bernal, but was raised in the home of his paternal uncle Nicolás following the murder of his father in 1897, and remained there after his mother died in 1901. He married on 8 March 1905 to Paulina Rueda Vargas, who died in 1946, and remarried in June 1948 to Susana Flórez Marino who survived him when he died on in Bogotá, D.C., he had no succession from either marriage.

== Selected works ==
- Esguerra Plata, Domingo (1896). La Doctrina Monroe (Thesis) (in Spanish). Bogotá: Casa Editorial de J. & L. Pérez. ISBN 9781103804641. OCLC 447664714.
