= 1st Infantry Division (Venezuela) =

- 1.ª División de Infantería
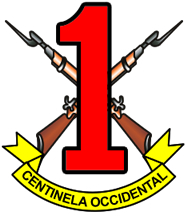
- Active: 15 April 1821–Present
- Country: Venezuela
- Branch: Bolivarian Army of Venezuela
- Type: Infantry
- Size: Division
- Engagements: Venezuelan War of Independence: Battle of Carabobo

Commanders
- Notable commanders: José Antonio Páez

The 1st Infantry Division is a military unit of the Bolivarian Army of Venezuela.

== History ==
The 1st Infantry Division was formed on 15 April 1821 during the Venezuelan War of Independence. During the Battle of Carabobo, it was commanded by Major General José Antonio Páez. On 1 March 2014, Brigadier General Tito Urbano Meleán became the commander of the division, replacing Major General Alfredo Iacobozzi Andrés.
