= Strategic Operations Command of the Bolivarian National Armed Forces (Venezuela) =

- Comando Estratégico Operacional de la Fuerza Armada Nacional Bolivariana
- Seal of the Strategic Operations Command of Venezuela.
- Founded: September 26, 2005; 20 years ago
- Country: Venezuela
- Part of: National Bolivarian Armed Forces of Venezuela

Insignia
- Flag

The Strategic Operations Command of the Bolivarian National Armed Forces (Spanish: Comando Estratégico Operacional de la Fuerza Armada Nacional Bolivariana, CEOFANB) is one of the six branches of the National Bolivarian Armed Forces of Venezuela. It has the responsibility of guiding operations of the Venezuelan Armed Forces.

Admiral Remigio Ceballos is the current Commandant of the OSC, with Major General Jose Ornellas Ferreira as the Chairman of the Joint Chiefs of Staff (as of 2017), and the roles of the OSC have been updated with a recent amendment of the Organic Law of the National Armed Forces in 2014.

== History ==
The Strategic Operations Command of Venezuela was founded by the late President Hugo Chávez on 26 September 2005, replacing the Unified Command of the National Armed Forces (CUFAN). Its mandate is to be the operational command for any operations that can be conducted by the National Armed Forces.

The OSC is led by a Commandant, assisted by the Chairman of the Joint Chiefs of Staff, who is also the deputy commandant. As it reports directly to the President and the Ministry of Defense, in recent years the Commandant has also been the Minister of Defense as well. He or she is appointed or relieved by the President.

== Mission ==
The mission of the Strategic Operations Command of Venezuela is to assist the Venezuelan National Armed Forces in geographical and aerospace operations.

Part of its responsibility is providing a unified national air defense capability, as well as for holding joint exercises to enhance combat readiness.

== Commanders ==
The commandants of the OSC have been:

No.	Portrait	Commander	Took office	Left office	Time in office	Ref.
?	Carlos Enrique Acosta Pérez	Major General; Carlos Enrique Acosta Pérez	20 July 2006	25 July 2026	6 months	
?	Jesús Alfonzo González González	Major General; Jesús Alfonzo González González	September 2008	March 2009	6 months	
?	Carlos José Mata Figueroa*	General-in-Chief; Carlos José Mata Figueroa*	March 2009	July 2010	1 year, 4 months	–
?	Henry Rangel Silva*	General-in-Chief; Henry Rangel Silva* (born 1961)	July 2010	July 2012	2 years	
?	Wilmer Omar Barrientos Fernández [es]	Major General; Wilmer Omar Barrientos Fernández (born 1959)	July 2012	July 2013	1 year	–
?	Vladimir Padrino López*	General-in-Chief; Vladimir Padrino López* (born 1963)	July 2013	June 2017	3 years, 11 months	–
?	Remigio Ceballos*	Admiral-in-Chief; Remigio Ceballos* (born 1963)	June 2017	8 July 2021	4 years, 1 month	–
?	Domingo Lárez	General-in-Chief; Domingo Lárez (born 1965)	8 July 2021	25 July 2026	5 years	

(*): They were subsequently appointed defense ministers, and they were also promoted to the rank while holding the office of the OSC Commandant.
