= 2nd Infantry Division (Venezuela) =

- 2.ª División de Infantería
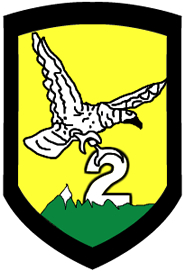
- Active: 8 April 1987–Present
- Country: Venezuela
- Branch: Bolivarian Army of Venezuela
- Type: Infantry
- Size: Division

The 2nd Infantry Division is a military unit of the Bolivarian Army of Venezuela

== History ==
The 2nd Infantry Division was formed on 8 April 1987. On 24 June 2010, the Division was present on parade in celebration of the 189th anniversary of the Battle of Carabobo.
