= Nemesio Camacho =

Colombian businessman and politician (1869–1929)

Nemesio Camacho Macías
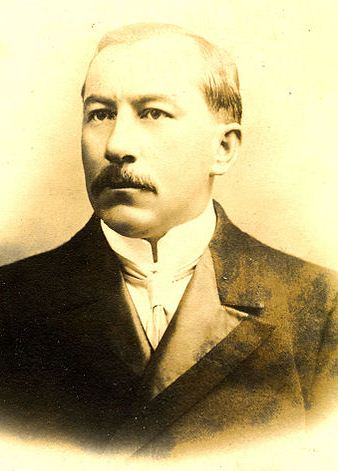

22nd Minister of Public Works of Colombia
- In office 31 December 1921 – 4 February 1922
- President: Jorge Holguín Mallarino
- Preceded by: Víctor Manuel Salazar
- Succeeded by: Florentino Manjarrés

20th Minister of Public Works of Colombia
- In office 11 November 1921 – 28 November 1921
- President: Jorge Holguín Mallarino
- Preceded by: Esteban Jaramillo
- Succeeded by: Víctor Manuel Salazar

4th Minister of Public Works of Colombia
- In office 29 July 1908 – 26 May 1909
- President: Rafael Reyes Prieto
- Preceded by: José María Ruiz
- Succeeded by: Guillermo Camacho Carrizosa

8th Minister of Finance and the Treasury of Colombia
- In office 22 March 1909 – 26 May 1909
- President: Rafael Reyes Prieto
- Preceded by: Jorge Holguín Mallarino
- Succeeded by: Domingo Esguerra Plata

Personal details
- Born: November 1869 Subachoque, Cundinamarca, Colombia
- Died: May 7, 1929 (aged 59) Paris, Île-de-France, France
- Resting place: Central Cemetery of Bogotá
- Party: Liberal
- Spouse: Leonilde Matiz Laverde
- Children: Luis Camacho Matíz, Isabel Camacho de Casabianca
- Education: Externado University of Colombia (LLB, 1890)
- Profession: Lawyer

Nemesio Camacho Macías (November 1869 — 7 May 1929) was a Colombian businessman and politician. The Stadium Nemesio Camacho in Bogotá is named after him.

He was the manager of the Bank of the Republic, the Colombian Train of the Pacific and the Tramways of Bogotá. He was also Ministry of Finance and Public Credit appointed by the President Rafael Reyes.

His son Luis Camacho Matiz, was the person who offered the land where the stadium would be constructed.

== Biography ==
Nemesio Camacho was born in Subachoque in November 1869, the same year his mother, Isabel Macias, died. In 1882, he was admitted to study at the College of San Bartolomé in Bogotá and in the same year, his father, Silverio Camacho, died. Later studied in literature National University, but he interrupted his studies to study philosophy and law at the External University ending in 1890. He obtained a law degree with "outstanding acclaim". At their level, opening a law office and exercising the right to 1895, when the civil war begins, and he financially supports and funds generals Servant Sarmiento and Rafael Uribe in the Company of the West. At this time he was appointed director of the Liberal Party and is postulated as a candidate for president with John the Evangelist Manrique and Miguel Samper. After the war, he returned to his trade as a lawyer until 1905, when capital brings Pepe Sierra to the creation of the Central Bank and is appointed manager, a position he held until August 1907. In the same year, 1905 Rafael Reyes closed the Congress and Nemesio Camacho was elected representative in the Assembly of Cundinamarca. In 1908, it is part of society that is responsible for organizing the concession for the construction of the Pacific Railway and the following year associates on a Milk Producers Cooperative. The President Rafael Reyes was appointed Minister of Public Works and Development in 1908 and between April and May 1909 provisionally assumed in the Ministry of Finance and Treasury for resignation of Jorge Holguin, while these charges was developed infrastructure such as the layout intercity roads and railways, and installation of electrical service in various municipalities.

Owned by Nemesio Camacho in Bogota's historic center, designed in 1909 by French architect Gaston Lelarge. At the end of his work as a minister is appointed manager Pacific Railroad by the board, holding the position between 1910 and 1915. In 1910, he supported the presidential candidate Carlos E. Restrepo and is a member of the Constituent Assembly that drafted the Constitutional Reform of the same year. In 1912, was one of the initiators and founders of the Olympia Theatre in Bogota on society formed by brothers John and Donato Di Domenico. In 1913. participated in the Convention of the Liberal Party led by General Rafael Uribe Uribe and the following year assumed again Party leadership after the assassination of Rafael Uribe. He served twice as the office of Senator and House Representative by the Colombian Liberal Party. 4 Between 1919 and 1922, he was manager of the Tramway de Bogotá, its popularity in this role was so great that the tram cars were known popularly as "Nemesia". In small cooperative management of employees organized keepers tram rails sections, made the expansion of the Central Station, ran the extension of lines to the south and the west and doubled the capacity of the line of Gauteng. In 1921, he led the coalition that pressured the resignation of President Marco Fidel Suárez. In 1924, on the initiative of Gonzalo Mejia, helps fund the construction of the Teatro Junín de Medellín, whose inauguration is done on 8 October of the same year with a screening of the Italian film "La Sombra". In December 1926, the society to participate in the creation of a Fruit Company. In 1928. as House Representative presents a draft reform of the electoral system which proposes the issuance of the certificate of citizenship for all voters. This project is approved as Law 31 of November 12, 1929, 5 with 41 votes in the House and 21 votes in the Senate, a few months after his death. Due to his health, he traveled to France for medical treatment, but died on May 7 of 1929. His remains were repatriated and buried in the Central Cemetery of Bogota.

The Estadio Nemesio Camacho El Campin. By his death on May 7, 1929, Camacho left an immense fortune primarily consisting of properties in Bogota and shares in different companies, the result of its business activities, the exercise of their profession and family heritage. In 1934, the mayor of Bogotá Jorge Gaitan drove the idea to build a football stadium for the citizens taking advantage of the 400th birthday of the capital and to receive the 1938 Bolivarian Games. Councilman Luis Camacho Matiz, son of Nemesio Camacho El Campin offered hacienda that was part of the goods that were the legacy of his father (located in Old Street Cundinamarca) as land to build the stadium that bears his name.

== Bibliography ==
- 470 years of Bogota: A cinematic look at Estadio El Campin, Colombian Film Heritage Foundation, accessed November 30, 2010.
- Berdugo Cotera, Elber (August 15, 2004) Nemesio Camacho Macias, a businessman cundiboyacence highland, Journal of Business Administration School No. 51. Bogota: University School of Business Administration, p. 134-157.
- Biography of Nemesio Camacho, Luis Angel Arango Library, accessed November 30, 2010.
- El Campin, a stadium with history, Profile, November 18, 2007.
- "Law 31 of 1929" Congress of Colombia. Retrieved January 31, 1929.
- Davila Ladron de Guevara, Carlos (2003). Colombian Entrepreneurship: a historical perspective. University of Los Andes.
- Marquez Rubio, Juan Carlos (2002). Nemesio Camacho, businessman and politician, 1869–1929. Monograph thesis. University of Los Andes.
