= Pedro Itriago Chacín =

Venezuelan lawyer, professor, politician and diplomat

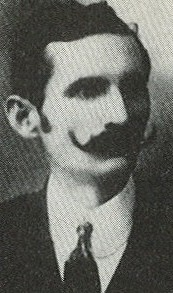

Minister of Foreign Affairs of Venezuela
- In office 7 July 1921 – 15 February 1936
- President: Juan Vicente Gómez
- Preceded by: Esteban Gil Borges
- Succeeded by: Esteban Gil Borges

Personal details
- Born: 9 September 1875 Zaraza, Guárico
- Died: 19 May 1936 (aged 60) Canary Islands
- Profession: lawyer, diplomat
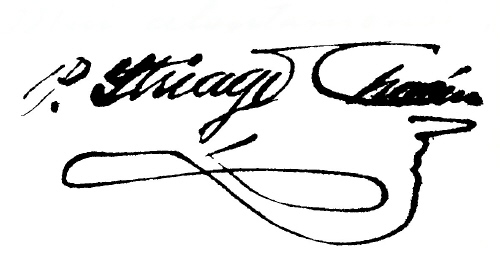
- Signature

Pedro Itriago Chacín (9 September 1875 – 19 May 1936), was a Venezuelan lawyer, professor, politician and diplomat. He was the Minister of Foreign Affairs of Venezuela from 1921 to 1936.

== See also ==
- Venezuela
- Foreign relations of Venezuela
- List of ministers of foreign affairs of Venezuela

Political offices
Preceded by Esteban Gil Borges	148th Minister of Foreign Affairs of Venezuela; 7 July 1921 – 15 February 1936	Succeeded by Esteban Gil Borges
