= Estadio El Campín =

Stadium in Bogotá, Colombia

Estadio Nemesio Camacho El Campín
- El Campín
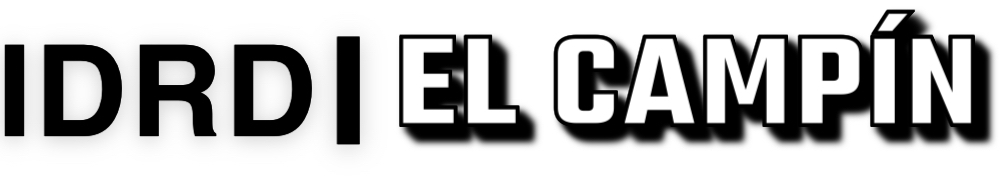

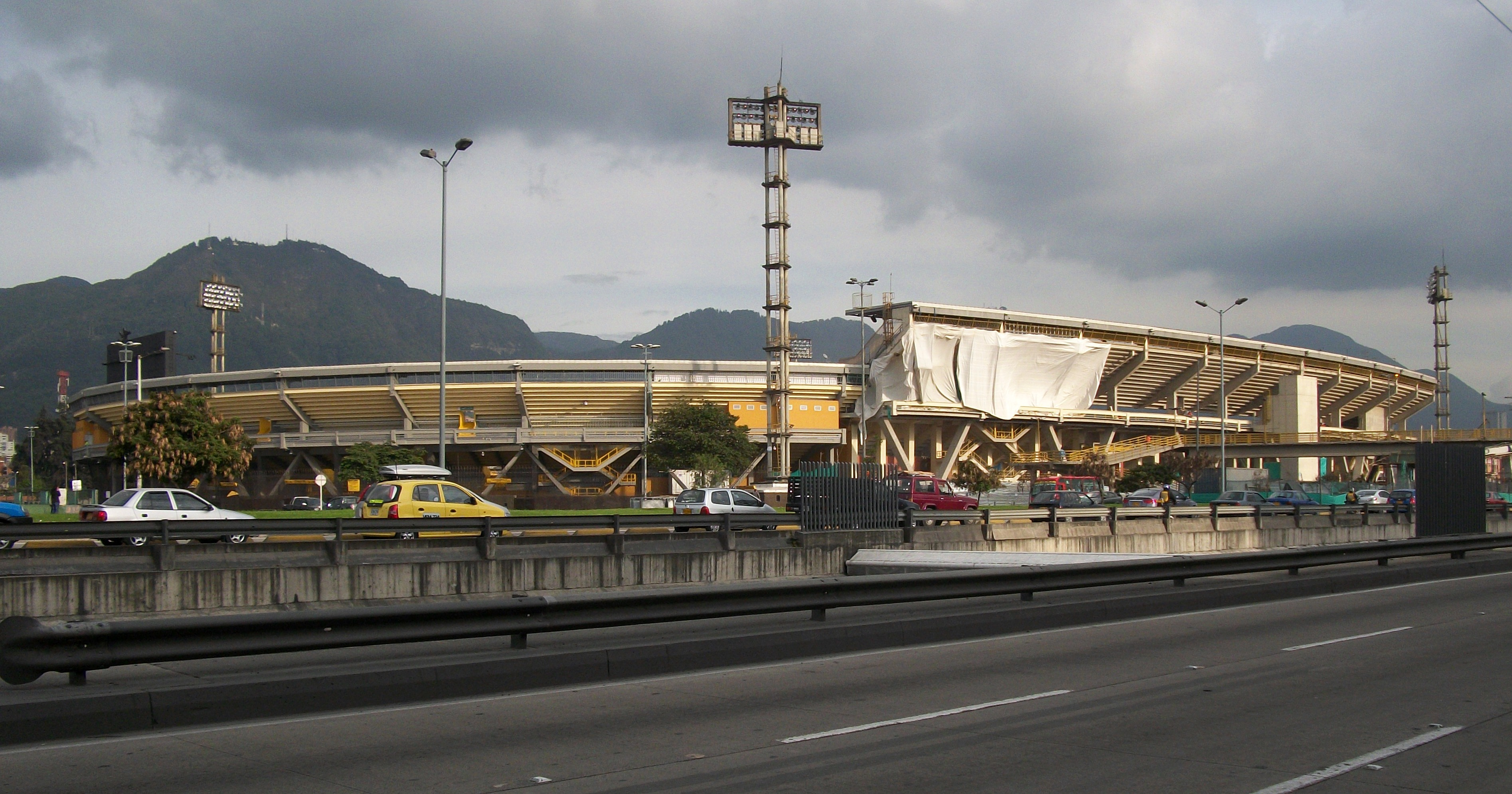
- The stadium in 2010
- Interactive map of Estadio Nemesio Camacho El Campín
- Full name: Estadio Nemesio Camacho El Campín
- Location: Bogotá, Colombia
- Coordinates: 4°38′46″N 74°4′39″W
- Elevation: 2,553 m (8,376 ft)
- Owner: IDRD
- Operator: Sencia
- Capacity: 39,512
- Surface: GrassMaster
- Field size: 105 m × 68 m (344 ft × 223 ft)
- Public transit: Transmilenio, Campín (station) (Line E)

Construction
- Opened: 10 August 1938
- Renovated: 2010–2011
- Cost: $25 million (U.S. dollars)
- Architect: Federico Leder Müller

Tenants
- Millonarios (1938–present); Independiente Santa Fe (1952–present); Colombia national football team (selected matches)

The Estadio Nemesio Camacho El Campín, commonly known as El Campín, is the main stadium of Bogotá, Colombia. It was inaugurated on 10 August 1938 and has a capacity of 39,512 spectators. It is the home ground of the Liga DIMAYOR teams Millonarios and Santa Fe. It is located at 2,553 meters (8,376 feet) above sea level.

The stadium is one of the highest-altitude major football venues in South America, situated at 2,553 metres (8,376 feet) above sea level.

The stadium is named after Nemesio Camacho, former manager of the then-existing streetcar system of Bogotá and also the father of Luis Camacho Matiz, the person who offered the land where the stadium would be constructed. The name Campín comes from a modification of the word "camping" because the area where the stadium currently stands was formerly a camping zone. It entered service as a football stadium around 1946, just in time to host the first national club tournament. It was used as the venue for the 2001 Copa América final, where the Colombian team were crowned champions of the American continent, defeating Mexico 1–0. This stadium was one of the eight stadiums of the 2011 FIFA U-20 World Cup held in Colombia, also hosted its closing ceremony. It also hosts matches of the 2024 FIFA U-20 Women's World Cup, including the final.

== History ==
In 1934, Jorge Eliécer Gaitán, then-mayor of Bogotá, had the idea to build a stadium for the pleasure of the citizens of Bogotá, taking advantage of the occasion provided by Bogotá's 400th anniversary, and also to host the 1938 Bolivarian Games. Until the opening of Estadio El Campín, the only major football ground in the city was the relatively small La Merced ground. Shortly after, then-councilman Luis Camacho offered a land to the city of Bogotá where the new stadium could be constructed.

At the time of the first Colombian Professional Football championship (1948 Campeonato Profesional), the stadium's capacity was of 23,500 seated persons. The stadium has been remodeled many times, and although the stadium's maximum capacity reached a maximum of 62,500 at 1968, capacity has since been decreased over time through various renovations.

The first game hosted at El Campín was a soccer match between Ecuador and Colombia, on August 10, 1938; Colombia lost 2–1. Millonarios has called El Campín their home ground since 1938, Santa Fe has played there since 1951. El Campín has been used several times to host matches of the Colombia national team, most notably the Copa América 2001 final against Mexico. El Campín was one of the many football grounds that could have been affected by FIFA's decision to forbid playing international football in places located above 2500 meters above sea level, but FIFA has since allowed international FIFA games in this stadium.

In recent years, the stadium has also incorporated technological systems related to crowd management and security during large-scale sporting events. In 2021, El Campín was used as a pilot venue for facial recognition and biometric identity verification systems during football events. The initiative, coordinated by Colombia's National Civil Registry and the National Police, aimed to strengthen access control and security measures during large-scale sporting events.

== Concerts ==
Until the field was renovated in 2005, many musical concerts were held in the stadium. Concerts and other cultural events were soon banned to protect the grass on the field. Concerts were then held at the Simón Bolívar Park, Palacio de los Deportes Arena, Movistar Arena, Plaza de Toros de Santamaria, Jaime Duque Park and Corferias.

December 15, 2011 the Congress approved a law that requires mayors to provide the use of stadiums in all Colombian cities at least once a month. Days later president Juan Manuel Santos approved the law. In consequence, since 2012 the stadium can be used again as venue for cultural events and it opens the possibility for great international singers to perform in Bogotá in 2012.

The Ministry of Culture, Recreation and Sport and the Institute for Recreation and Sport (IDRD), utilized various techniques to determine the impact of large events on the grass of the sports arena. Tests simulated the effects of a large crowd on the field. "The first stage of the test consisted of pruning, surveying, geotechnical engineering and agronomy of 100 square meters of turf," said District. Also installed were protective devices that distributed weight and allowed photosynthesis to occur. Next a stage was installed and 400 graduates of the police auxiliary took the field, under which were placed the various turf protection elements, until a density of four persons per square meter was achieved, which is the density typical of large events. The staff entered at 4:00 pm and stayed until 10:00 pm.

March 8, 2012 the Ministry of Culture, Recreation and Sport confirmed that the stadium would again, after a 4-year pause, host concerts and cultural events. On March 15, 2012, concert producer Fernan Martinez and Bogotá Mayor (Gustavo Petro) confirmed that Paul McCartney would perform during his On the Run Tour on April 19, 2012, at the stadium. On March 27 at 4:00 p.m. tickets for the concert became available in TuBoleta and at 5:30 p.m. 75% of the tickets were already sold. It is expected for the show to sold all the tickets in less than 24 hours. On March 27 tickets started to be sold at 4:00 p.m. and one hour and a half later 75% of the tickets were already sold. 24 hours after 90% of the tickets were already sold.

Lady Gaga performed as part of her The Born This Way Ball on November 6, 2012, at the stadium in front of 30,546 people.

Justin Bieber performed on October 29, 2013, in the stadium during his Believe Tour

British boyband One Direction performed at the stadium for the first time in Colombia on April 25, 2014, during their Where We Are Stadium Tour 2014. Tickets for the show sold out in a record time, prompting concert producers to add an extra 6,000 tickets which also sold out the first day they became available for a total of 36,386 tickets sold by December 21, 2013.

Shakira holds the artist record for most events held at the stadium, having performed 5 shows since her first tour. In 2025, she will return to the stadium with 2 shows of Las Mujeres Ya No Lloran World Tour, extending her record as the most show in the venue's history with 7 shows.

The Foo Fighters performed for the first time in Colombia at the stadium on January 31, 2015.

The Rolling Stones performed for the first time in Colombia during their Olé Tour on March 10, 2016, at the stadium in front of an estimated 45,000 people.

Coldplay performed at the stadium on April 13, 2016, as part of their A Head Full of Dreams Tour for a sold out stadium of 41,376 people. They came back to the stadium on September 16 and 17, 2022 as part of their Music of the Spheres World Tour for a sold-out crowd of 88,314 featuring opening act Camila Cabello.

U2 performed for the first time in Colombia as part of their Joshua Tree Tour 2017 on October 7, 2017, also to an estimated audience of 45,000 people.

The Weeknd performed at the stadium on 4 October 2023 as part of his After Hours til Dawn Tour for an audience of 35,386 people.

Guns N' Roses performed at the stadium on November 29, 1992, during the band's Use Your Illusion Tour.

The same band returned almost 30 years later, and performed on October 11 and 12, 2022, both being sold outs, as part of their We're F'N' Back! Tour. An estimated over 85,000 people attended during those two dates. Colombian rock band Aterciopelados opened for them.

Dua Lipa performed at the stadium on 28 November 2025 as part of her Radical Optimism Tour.

BTS will perform on 2 and 3 October 2026 as part of their Arirang World Tour.

== Average attendances ==
Tenants	League season	Home games	Average attendance
Independiente Santa Fe	2023 Clausura	10	8,220
Millonarios	2023 Clausura	10	21,608
Independiente Santa Fe	2023 Apertura	10	10,976
Millonarios	2023 Apertura	10	17,527

Preceded by Estadio Defensores del Chaco; Asunción	Copa América; Final Venue; 2001	Succeeded by Estadio Nacional; Lima
Preceded by Cairo International Stadium; Cairo	FIFA U-20 World Cup; Final Venue; 2011	Succeeded by Türk Telekom Arena; Istanbul
Preceded by Estadio Nacional; San José	FIFA U-20 Women's World Cup; Final Venue; 2024	Succeeded by TBD; TBD
