= Domingo Lárez =

Venezuelan military personnel

- Born: March 9, 1965 (age 61); Caracas, Venezuela
- Allegiance: Venezuela
- Branch: Venezuelan Army
- Rank: General-in-chief
- Commands: Strategic Operational Command
- Education: Bolivarian Army Military Academy

Domingo Antonio Hernández Lárez (born March 9, 1965) is a Venezuelan military officer with the rank of General-in-Chief, who has served as the Commanding General of the Strategic Operational Command of the Bolivarian National Armed Forces (CEOFANB) since 2021. He previously commanded the Bolivarian Army and was director of the Bolivarian Army Military Academy (2013–2016).

== Biography ==
Domingo Hernández was born in the Cathedral Parish of Caracas on March 9, 1965. He entered the Bolivarian Army Military Academy , where he graduated with a Bachelor of Science and Military Arts on July 5, 1988, ranking 10th in the order of merit in the General of Brigade promotion. “Manuel Manrique”.

=== Military career ===
Domingo Lárez has held several positions, including Director of the Military Academy of the Bolivarian Army from 2013 to 2016, Commander of the Aragua Comprehensive Defense Operational Zone No. 44 -ZODI Aragua- of the REDI Central from 2016 to 2018, Commander of the Central Strategic Comprehensive Defense Region, REDI Central in 2018–2019, Commander of the Capital Strategic Comprehensive Defense Region REDI Capital in 2019-2020 and Commander General of the Army in 2020–2021.

=== Strategic Operational Commander ===
On July 7, 2021, Nicolás Maduro appointed then-Major General Domingo Hernández as the new Strategic Operational Commander of the Bolivarian National Armed Forces promoting him to the highest military rank, General in Chief. On August 2, 2024, as Strategic Operational Commander of the Bolivarian National Armed Forces (FANB), Domingo Hernández reported that "the state of suspension" of this resolution remains in effect, in a message on X where he pointed out as "Nazi fascist mercenaries" members of the "comanditos", the measure issued on the occasion of the presidential elections scheduled, in principle, for a period of four days, from July 26 to 29. The protests against the official result of the elections in different Venezuelan cities have left, according to the official, a balance of more than 2,000 people detained and two soldiers dead.
