= Esteban Gil Borges =

Venezuelan politician (1879–1942)

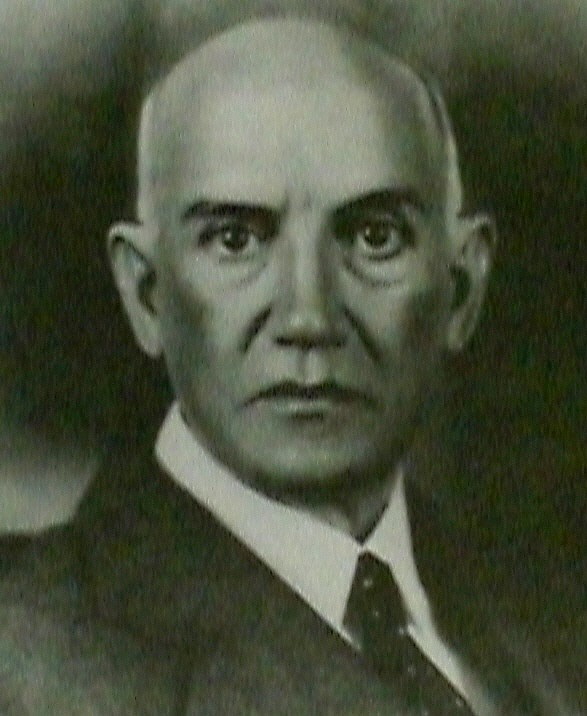

Minister of Foreign Affairs of Venezuela
- In office 2 January 1919 – 7 July 1921
- President: Juan Vicente Gómez
- In office 17 February 1936 – 5 May 1941
- President: Eleazar López Contreras

Personal details
- Born: 1879 Caracas, Venezuela
- Died: 3 August 1942 (aged 62–63) Caracas, Venezuela
- Profession: lawyer, diplomat
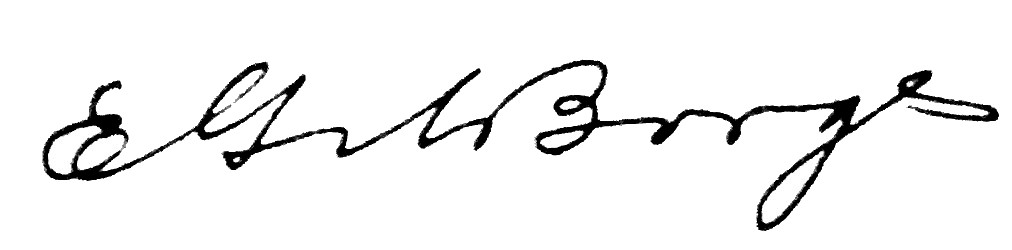
- Signature

Esteban Gil Borges (Caracas, 1879 – Caracas, 3 August 1942), was a Venezuelan politician, diplomat, writer and university professor.

== Biography ==
Esteban Gil Borges was born in 1879 in Caracas, Venezuela. He worked as a lawyer, diplomat, and politician. He was the 147th Minister of Foreign Affairs of Venezuela from 2 January 1919 until 7 July 1921.

Esteban Gil Borges was a member of the Venezuelan Academy of Language (1916) and a founding member of the Academy of Political Sciences (1915).

== See also ==
- Colombia–Venezuela relations
- List of ministers of foreign affairs of Venezuela

Political offices
Preceded by Bernardino Mosquera	147th Minister of Foreign Affairs of Venezuela; 2 January 1919 – 7 July 1921	Succeeded by Pedro Itriago Chacín
Preceded by Pedro Itriago Chacín	149th Minister of Foreign Affairs of Venezuela; 17 February 1936 – 5 May 1941	Succeeded by Caracciolo Parra Pérez
