= Luis López de Mesa =

Colombian psychiatrist (1884–1967)

Minister of Foreign Affairs
- In office April 23, 1947 – May 5, 1947
- President: Mariano Ospina Pérez
- Preceded by: Carlos Lozano y Lozano
- Succeeded by: Domingo Esguerra Plata
- In office August 12, 1938 – August 7, 1942
- President: Eduardo Santos Montejo
- Preceded by: Francisco Samper Madrid
- Succeeded by: Gabriel Turbay Abunader

Minister of National Education
- In office August 13, 1934 – September 24, 1935
- President: Alfonso López Pumarejo
- Preceded by: Carlos Lozano y Lozano
- Succeeded by: Calixto Torres Umaña

Personal details
- Born: Luis Eduardo López de Mesa Gómez; October 12, 1884 Don Matías, Antioquia, Colombia
- Died: October 18, 1967 (aged 83) Bogotá, D.C., Colombia
- Resting place: San Pedro Cemetery Museum
- Education: National University of Colombia (MD)
- Profession: Medical Doctor

Luis Eduardo López de Mesa Gómez (October 12, 1884 – October 18, 1967) was a Colombian medical doctor, Harvard psychiatrist, Dean of the National University of Colombia, Minister of National Education, and Minister of Foreign Affairs.

== Works ==
- El libro de los apólogos (1918)
- La biografía de Gloria Etzel (1921)
- El factor étnico (1927)
- Civilización contemporánea (1926)
- La tragedia de Nilse (novela, 1928)
- Biografía de Gloria Etzel (novela, 1929)
- Introducción a la historia de la cultura en Colombia (1930)
- Cómo se ha formado la Nación colombiana (1934)
- Disertación sociológica(1939)
- Miguel Antonio Caro y Rufino José Cuervo (1944)
- Nosotros y la Esfinge (1947)
- Perspectivas culturales (1949)
- Escrutinio sociológico de la historia colombiana (1955)
- Escrutinio sociológico de la historia colombiana (1956)
- Rudimentos de onomatología (1960)
- Oraciones panegíricas (1964).
