= Barbula (disambiguation) =

Barbula is a genus of mosses in the family Pottiaceae

Barbula (rendered in Spanish as bárbula) is Latin for "little beard", and may also refer to:

- an old name for the genus Caryopteris in Lamiaceae of flowering plants
- some species with this epithet, like Oestophora barbula in Oestophora or Austrosaropogon barbula in Asilidae
- Quintus Aemilius Q.f. L.n. Barbula, consul 317 BC, 311 BC, father of
- Lucius Aemilius Q.f. Q.n. [L.pr.] Barbula, consul 281 BC, apparently father of
- Marcus Aemilius L.f. Q.n. [Q.pr.] Barbula, consul 230 BC (all three from gens Aemilia
- Quintus Aemilius Lepidus, possibly Quintus Aemilius Lepidus Barbula) (fl. 1st century BC)
- Bárbula, a locality in Naguanagua Municipality, Venezuela, which gives its name to:
  - two neighbourhoods: (Santa Eduviges (Vivienda Rural Bárbula) and Puente Bárbula)
  - Bárbula Tunnel managed by Instituto de Ferrocarriles del Estado in Venezuela with 7.8 km (4.8 mi), which makes it the longest in South America
  - the Battle of Bárbula (September 30, 1813) mentioned in the "National Anthem of Colombia", where Simón Bolívar defeated Santiago Bobadilla and Colombian revolutionary leader Atanasio Girardot died (painted by Cristóbal Rojas)
