= Juan Alfredo Pinto Saavedra =

Colombian diplomat

Colombia Ambassador to India
- Incumbent
- Assumed office 12 December 2007
- Preceded by: Pedro Pablo de Bedout Gori

Colombia Ambassador to Iran
- Incumbent
- Assumed office 16 March 2010
- Preceded by: Pedro Pablo de Bedout Gori

Colombia Ambassador to Bangladesh
- Incumbent
- Assumed office 17 August 2009
- Preceded by: Pedro Pablo de Bedout Gori

Colombia Ambassador to Sri Lanka
- Incumbent
- Assumed office 28 November 2008
- Preceded by: Pedro Pablo de Bedout Gori

Colombia Ambassador to Indonesia
- In office 19 June 2009 – 28 October 2011
- Preceded by: Pedro Pablo de Bedout Gori
- Succeeded by: Alfonso Garzón Méndez

Colombia Ambassador to Turkey
- In office January 8, 2016 – November 4, 2018
- Preceded by: Fernando Panesso Serna
- Succeeded by: Julio Aníbal Riaño Velandia

Personal details
- Born: November 2, 1953 (age 72) Girardot, Cundinamarca, Colombia
- Party: Liberal
- Spouse: Soraya Caro Vargas
- Education: Jorge Tadeo Lozano University
- Profession: Economist

Juan Alfredo Pinto Saavedra (born 2 November 1953) was Ambassador of Colombia to India with concurrent accreditation to Iran, Nepal, Sri Lanka, Bangladesh, until 2011, to Indonesia and until 2018 to Turkey. Previous to this appointment, he served in the business sector as President of the Colombian Association of Small and Medium Businesses, ACOPI, co-founder and President of the Socioeconomic and Technological Research Corporation of Colombia, CINSET, Manager of the Bogotá Water and Sewerage Company, EAAB, Vice President of the World Association for Small and Medium Enterprises among other endeavours as well as professor of economic studies in various universities in Colombia.
