= Bárbula =

- Locality
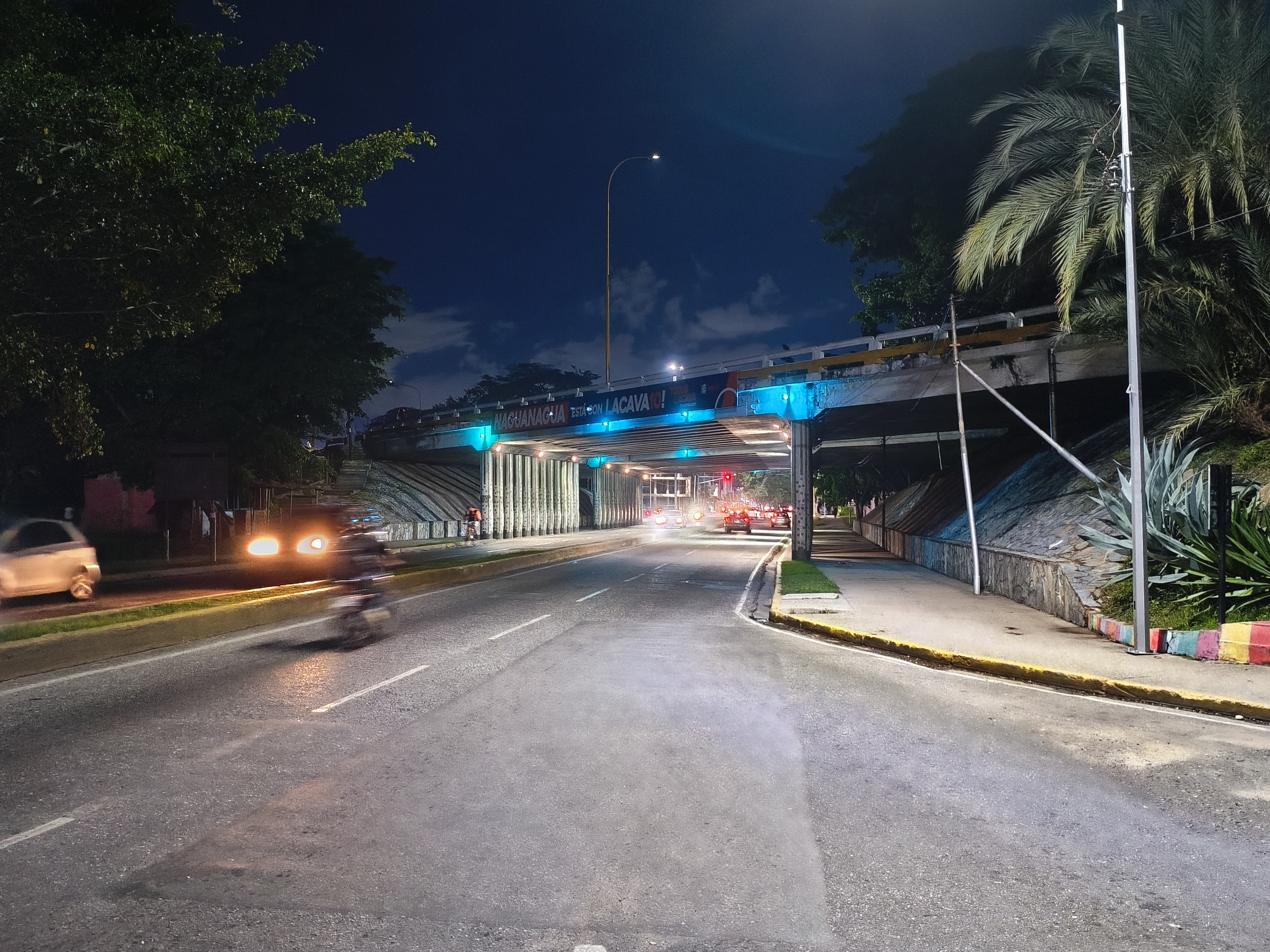
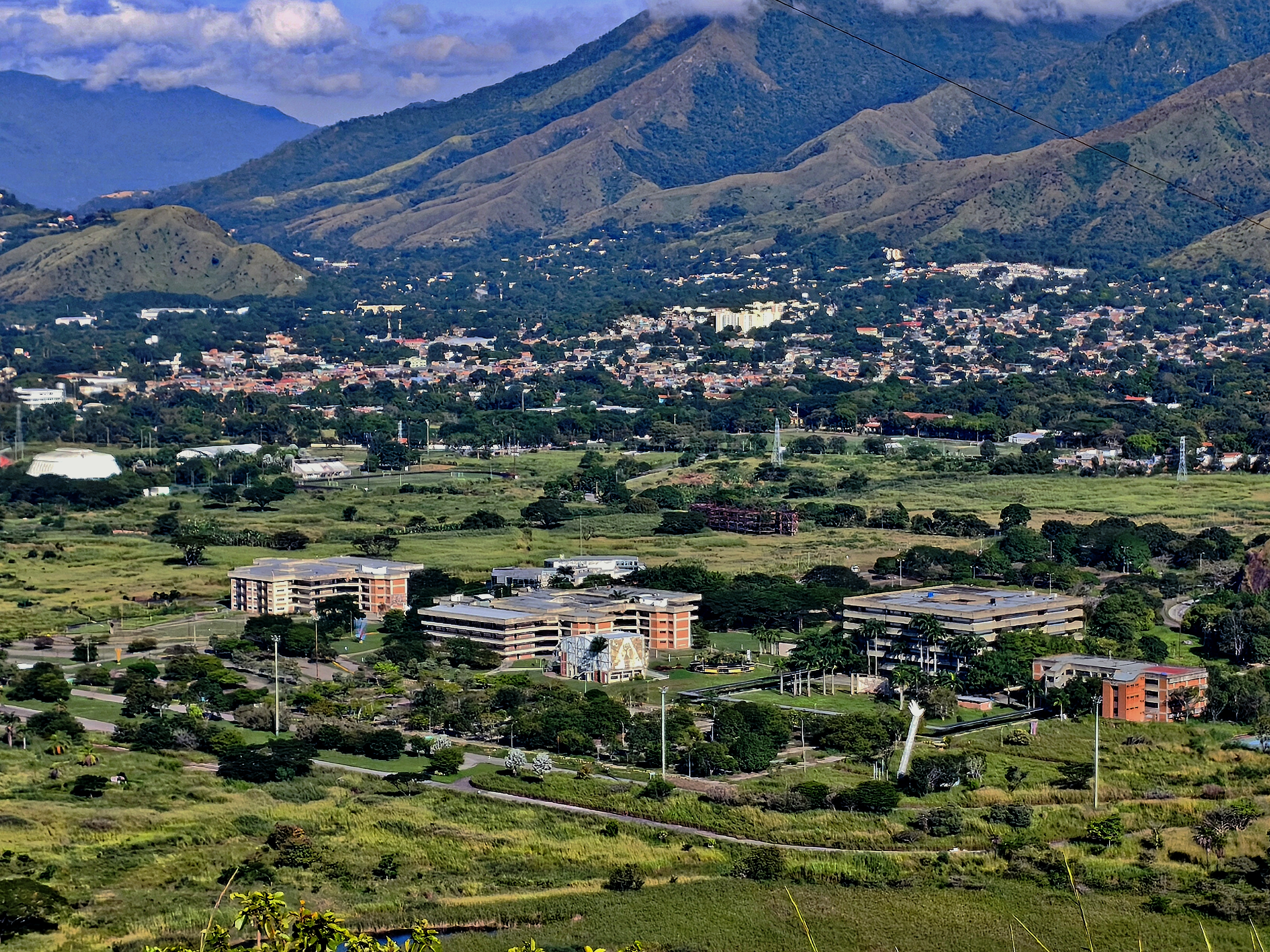
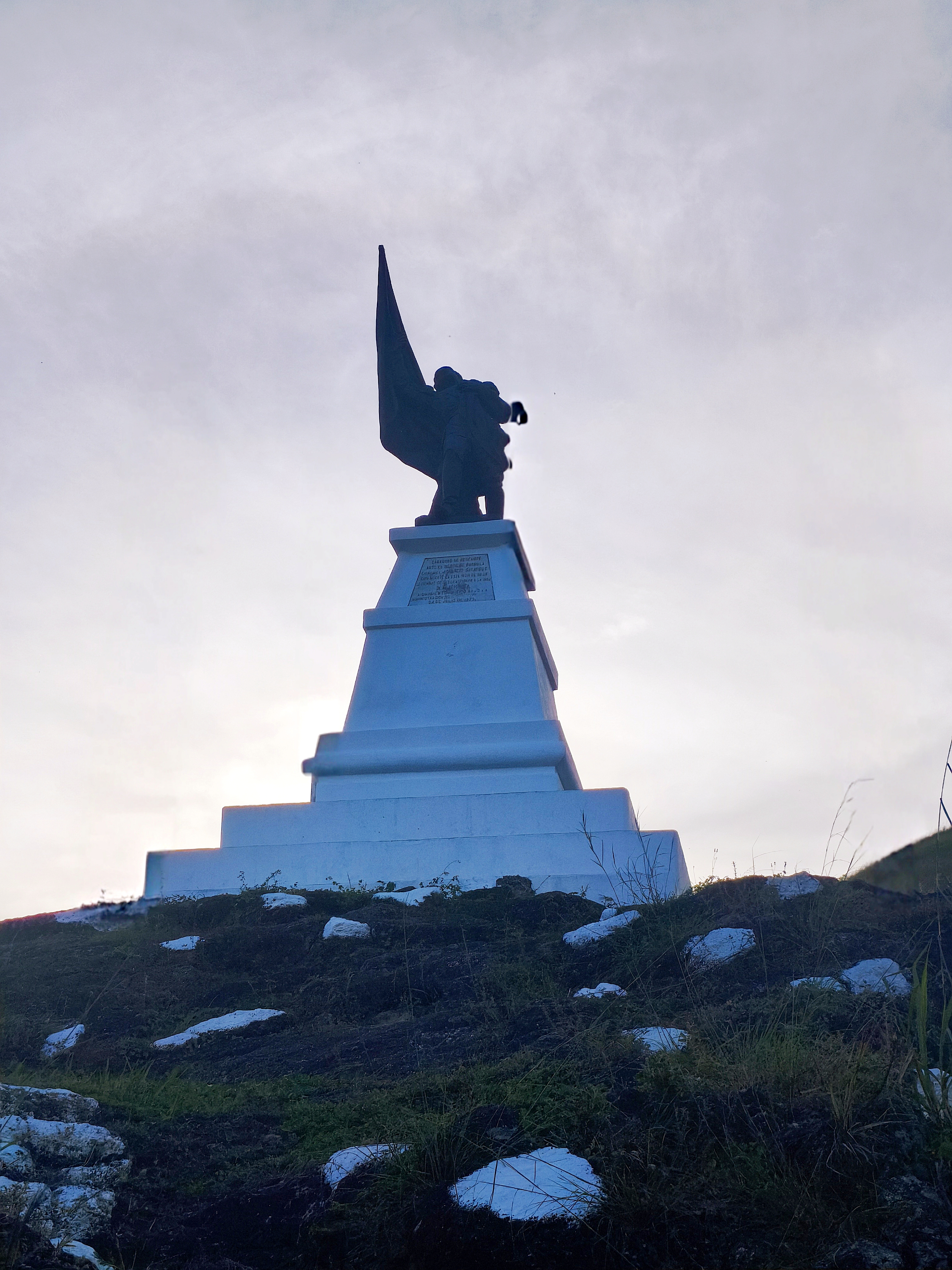
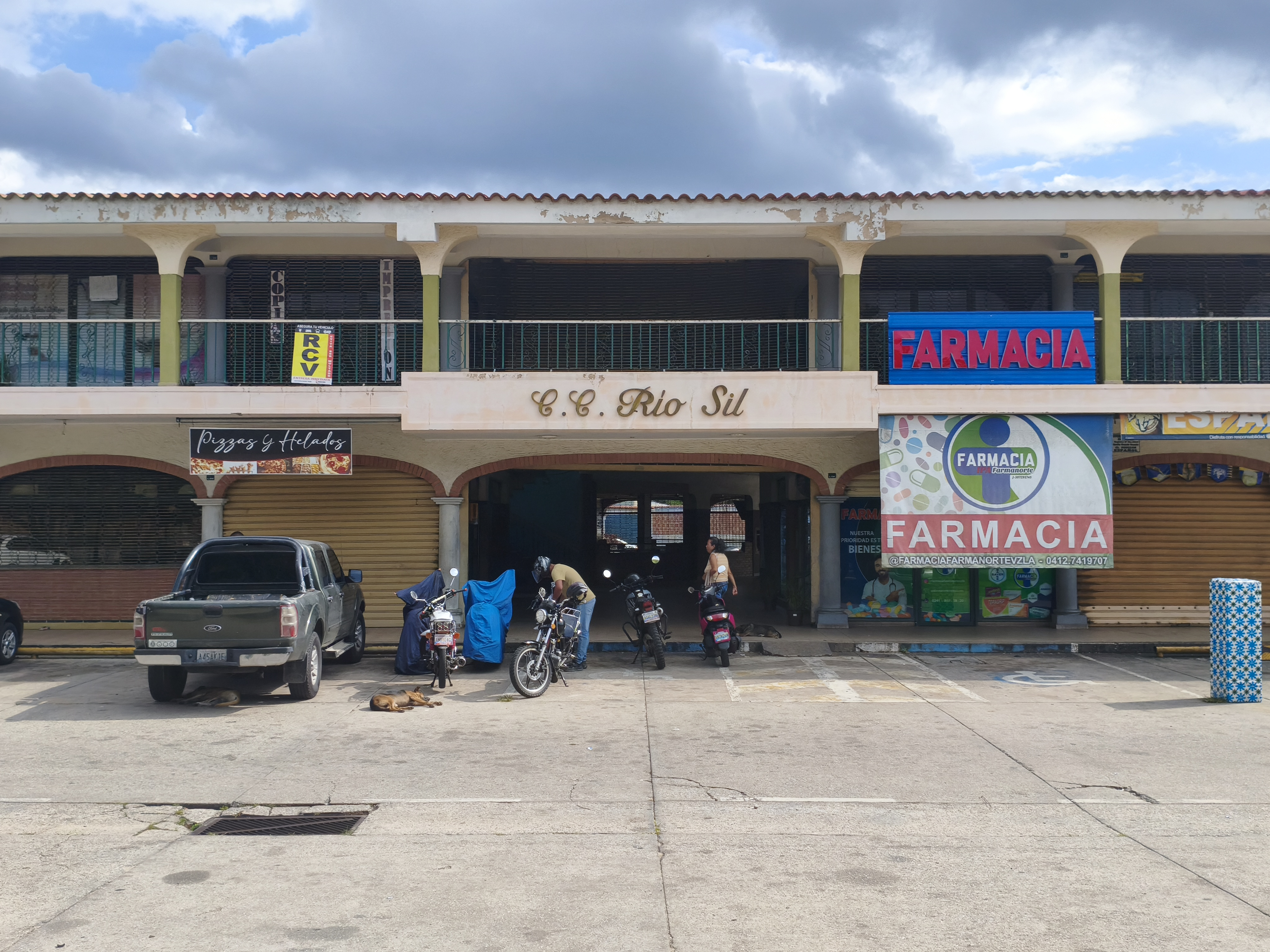
- Bárbula Bridge Bárbula University Campus Monument to Girardot Rio Sil
- Interactive map of Bárbula
- Location of Bárbula Bárbula (South America) Bárbula (Earth)
- Coordinates: 10°17′N 68°01′W
- Country: Venezuela
- State: Carabobo
- Municipality: Naguanagua Municipality
- Established: 16th century (as Hato de Bárbula)
- Highest elevation: 550 m (1,800 ft)
- Lowest elevation: 450 m (1,480 ft)
- Time zone: UTC−4 (VET)
- Postal code: 2005
- Area code: 0241

Bárbula (Note: Pronunciation: English: /bɑːrbʊlə/ BAR-boo-lə; Spanish: Spanish pronunciation: [baɾβula].) is a locality located to the north of the Naguanagua Municipality, in the state of Carabobo, Venezuela. The area has great historical significance, being the site of the Battle of Bárbula in 1813, and today it is especially known for housing the main campus of the University of Carabobo, one of the most important higher education institutions in the central region of the country.

== Etymology ==
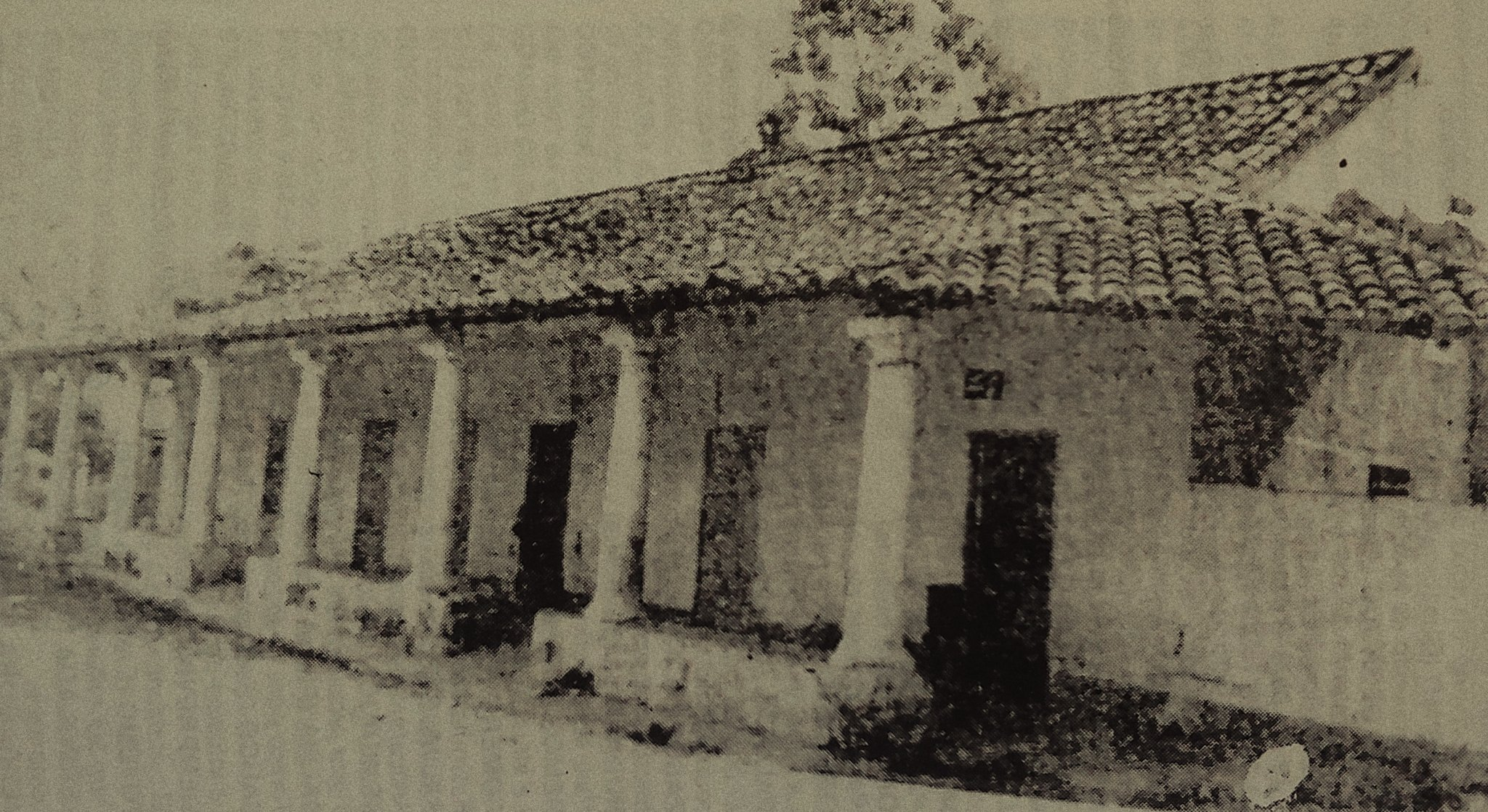
Bárbula Estate, belonging to Barbola de Villegas.

Although there is no definitive consensus, the most widespread theory about the origin of the name "Bárbula" suggests that it derives from an anthroponym.

Historical research points to the existence of Doña Barbola de Villegas, who would have been one of the initial owners of the Bárbula Estate (Hato de Bárbula in Spanish) during the colonial period. According to this version, the name of the estate perpetuated her name, who in turn was the niece of the Spanish conqueror, Juan de Villegas.

== History ==
=== Pre-Columbian era ===
The valley of Naguanagua was inhabited by various indigenous ethnic groups before the arrival of the Spaniards. Mainly, groups of Caribbean and Arawakan affiliation, such as the Taramainas, occupied the region. These semi-nomadic groups based their subsistence on hunting, gathering, and incipient agriculture. The presence of petroglyphs in nearby areas attests to human occupation of the region since pre-Hispanic times in the area of what is now Bárbula.

=== The Arrival of the Spaniards and the Colonial Period (16th – 18th Centuries) ===
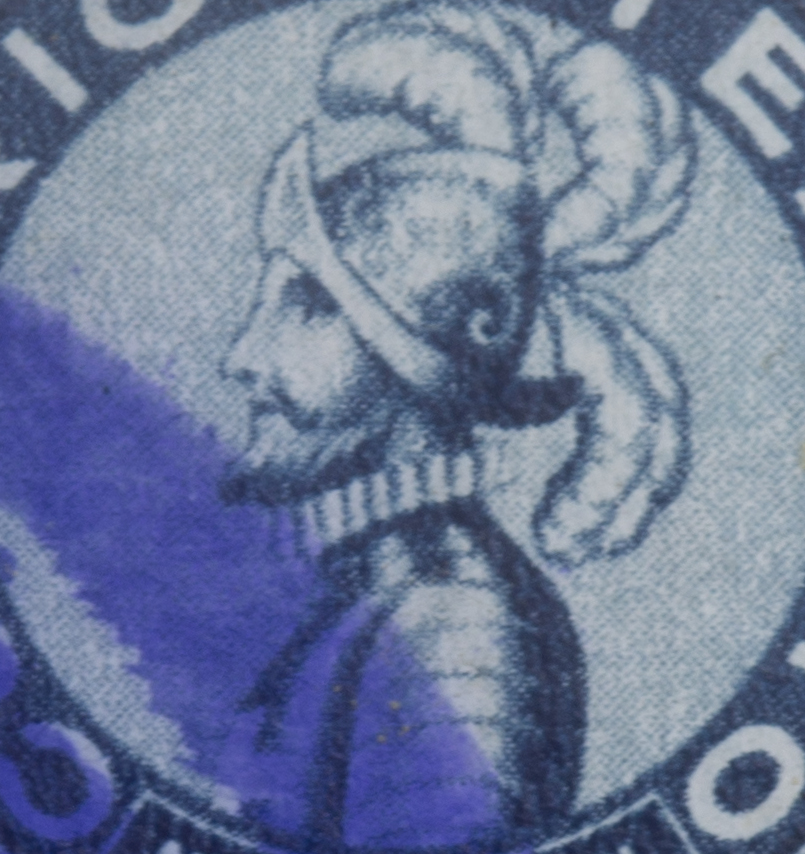
Illustration of the conqueror Juan de Villegas on a stamp commemorating the 400th anniversary of Barquisimeto.

Following the Spanish conquest and the subsequent foundation of Nueva Valencia del Rey in the mid-16th century, the fertile lands of the Naguanagua valley were distributed among the colonizers through the system of repartimientos (land grants). Juan de Villegas, a prominent Spanish conquistador and Governor of the Province of Venezuela who is historically credited with the exploration of the region and the discovery of Lake Valencia, was among the first figures to recognize the immense agricultural and strategic value of these valleys.

Throughout most of the colonial era, Bárbula did not exist as a formal town or urban settlement, but rather as an extensive latifundio (large estate) known as the Hato de Bárbula. This property was a cornerstone of the regional economy, primarily dedicated to large-scale cattle ranching and intensive agriculture. The estate's importance was largely due to its strategic geographical position, as it commanded the natural mountain pass between the city of Valencia and the Lake Valencia basin. By serving as a mandatory transit point on the direct route toward the Caribbean coast, the hacienda became a vital link for trade with the port of Puerto Cabello.

Due to this privileged location, the Hato de Bárbula flourished and became fully integrated into the economic fabric of the Captaincy General of Venezuela. The lands became famous for the cultivation of high-value export commodities that were highly sought after in European markets, specifically cacao, tobacco, and indigo. These products were transported from the estate through the mountains to the coast, establishing Bárbula as a key producer within the Spanish Empire's trade networks before the dawn of the independence movement.

During his expeditions through the equinoctial regions in the early 19th century, the German naturalist Alexander von Humboldt visited the Bárbula Estate. He documented the existence of the "cow tree" (Palo de Vaca), noting that the local inhabitants extracted a nourishing, milk like sap from it, a discovery that gained international scientific interest at the time.

=== Battle of Bárbula ===
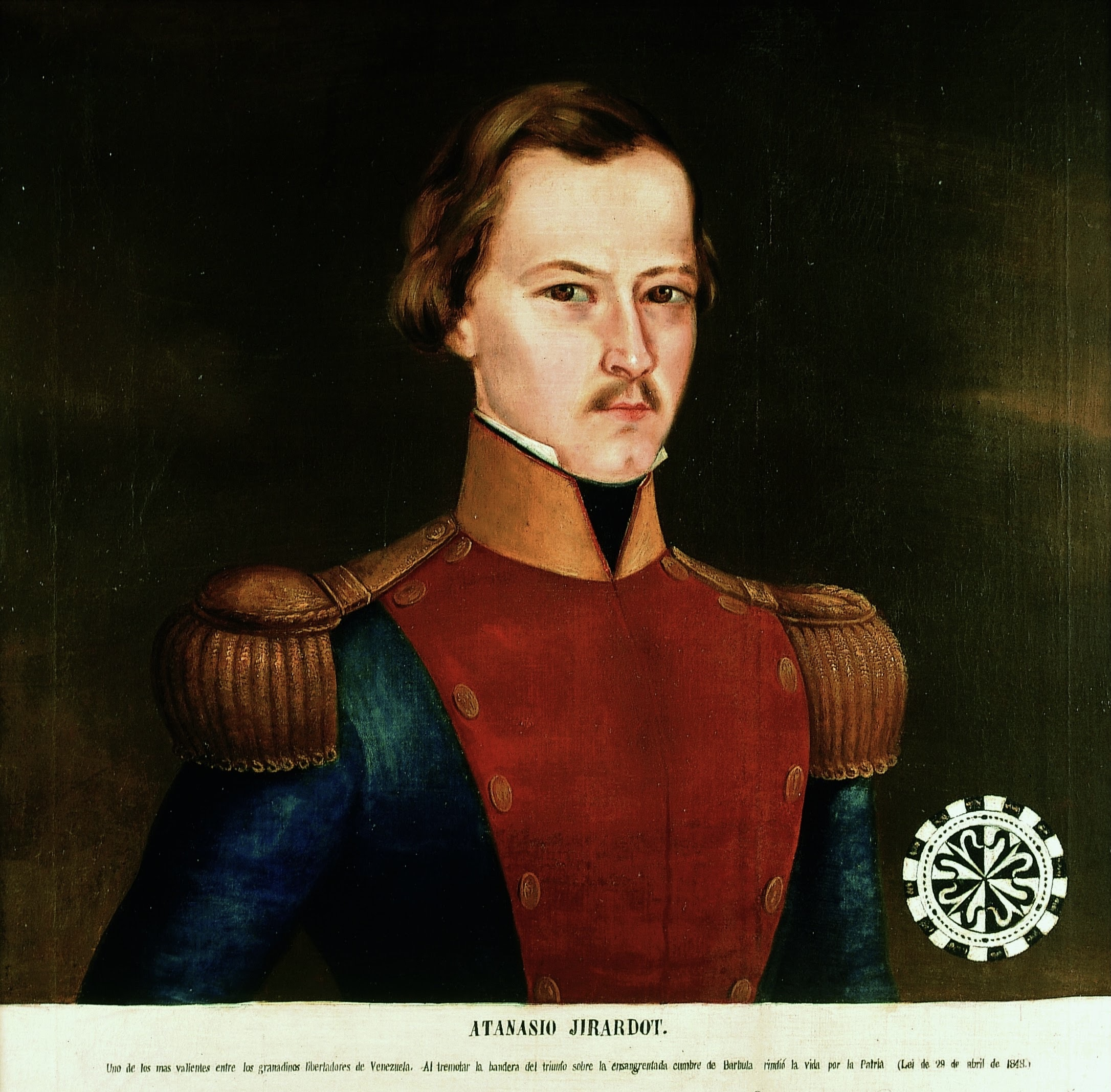
Atanasio Girardot

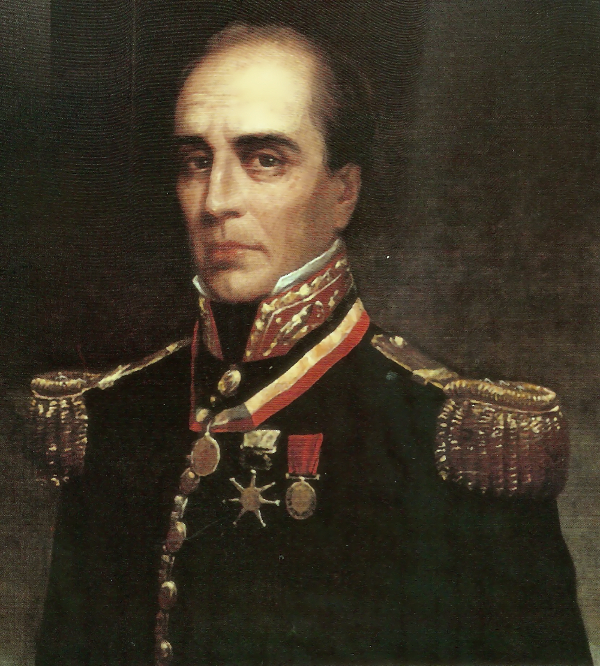
Rafael Urdaneta

The locality gained significant historical prominence during the Venezuelan War of Independence as a strategic point within the Admirable Campaign. This military offensive, launched from the United Provinces of New Granada and led by Simón Bolívar, aimed to liberate western Venezuela from Spanish control. As the patriot forces advanced toward the center of the country in late 1813, the heights of Bárbula became a critical site for a confrontation against the Royalist troops commanded by Domingo de Monteverde.

On September 30, 1813, the Battle of Bárbula took place. Bolívar’s vanguard was led by the young Colombian Colonel Atanasio Girardot, supported by other prominent figures of the independence movement, including the strategist Rafael Urdaneta. While Urdaneta played a vital role in coordinating the offensive and ensuring the cohesion of the patriot lines, Girardot was tasked with directly dislodging the Spanish forces from their advantageous positions on the hills. Despite heavy resistance and the challenging terrain, the combined effort of the patriot leaders resulted in a decisive victory, forcing the Royalist army to retreat toward the fortified city of Puerto Cabello.

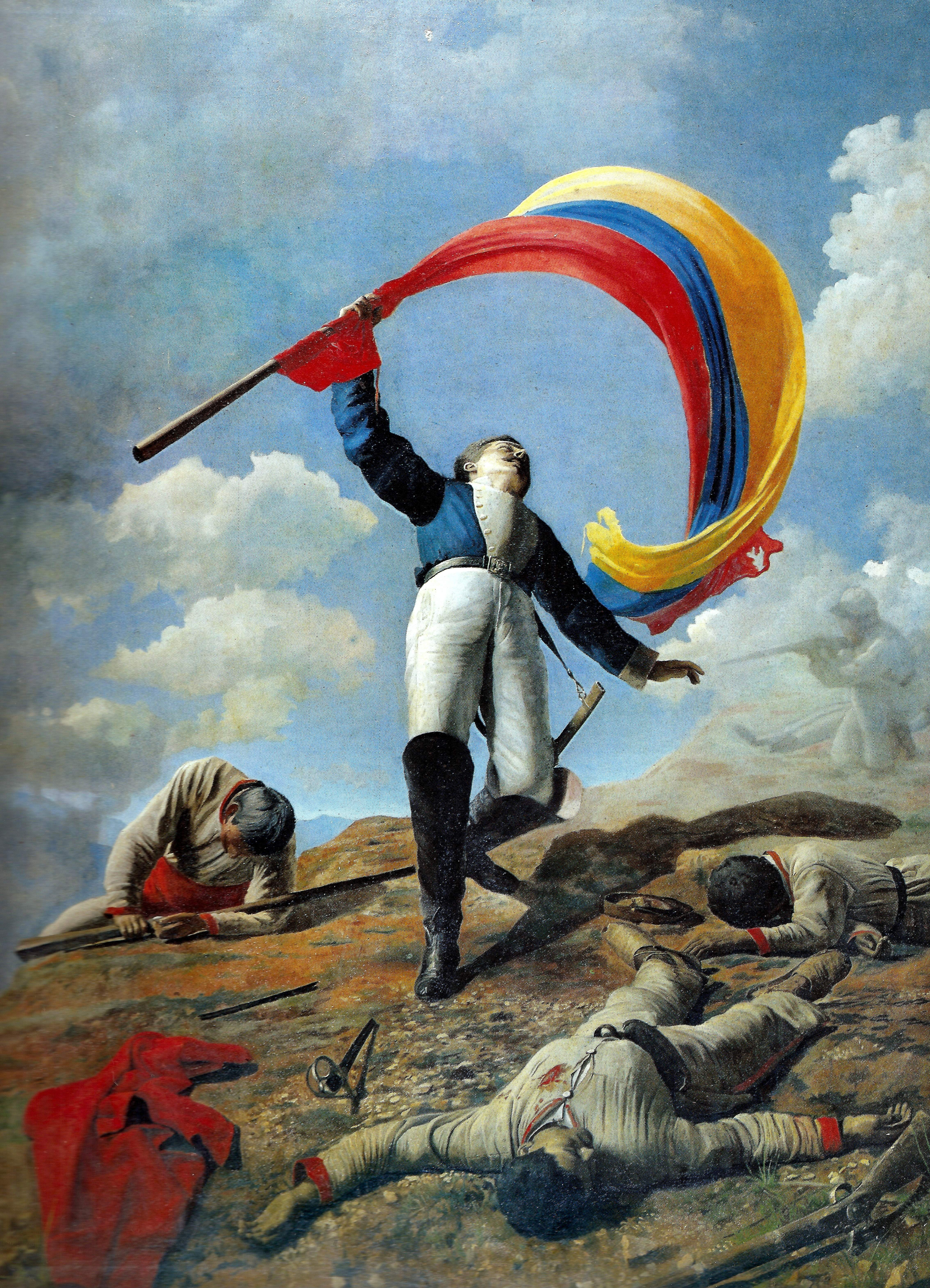
The Death of Girardot in Bárbula. Oil painting by Cristóbal Rojas, 1883.

The triumph, however, is most remembered for the death of Girardot, who was struck by musket fire at the moment of victory while planting the republican flag on the captured summit. This sacrifice, witnessed by Urdaneta and the rest of the troops, became a powerful symbol of the revolutionary alliance between Venezuela and Colombia. To this day, the battle holds a place of honor in South American history and is explicitly immortalized in the National Anthem of Colombia, which refers to the "heroic death" of Girardot on the fields of Bárbula.

Spanish original

Del Orinoco el cauce
se colma de despojos,
de sangre y llanto un río
se mira allí correr.

En Bárbula no saben
las almas ni los ojos,
si admiración o espanto
sentir o padecer.

English translation

The bed of the Orinoco
Is heaped with plunder,
Of blood and tears a river
is seen to flow there.

In Bárbula know
neither souls nor eyes,
whether admiration to feel
or fear to suffer.

=== Modern Era ===
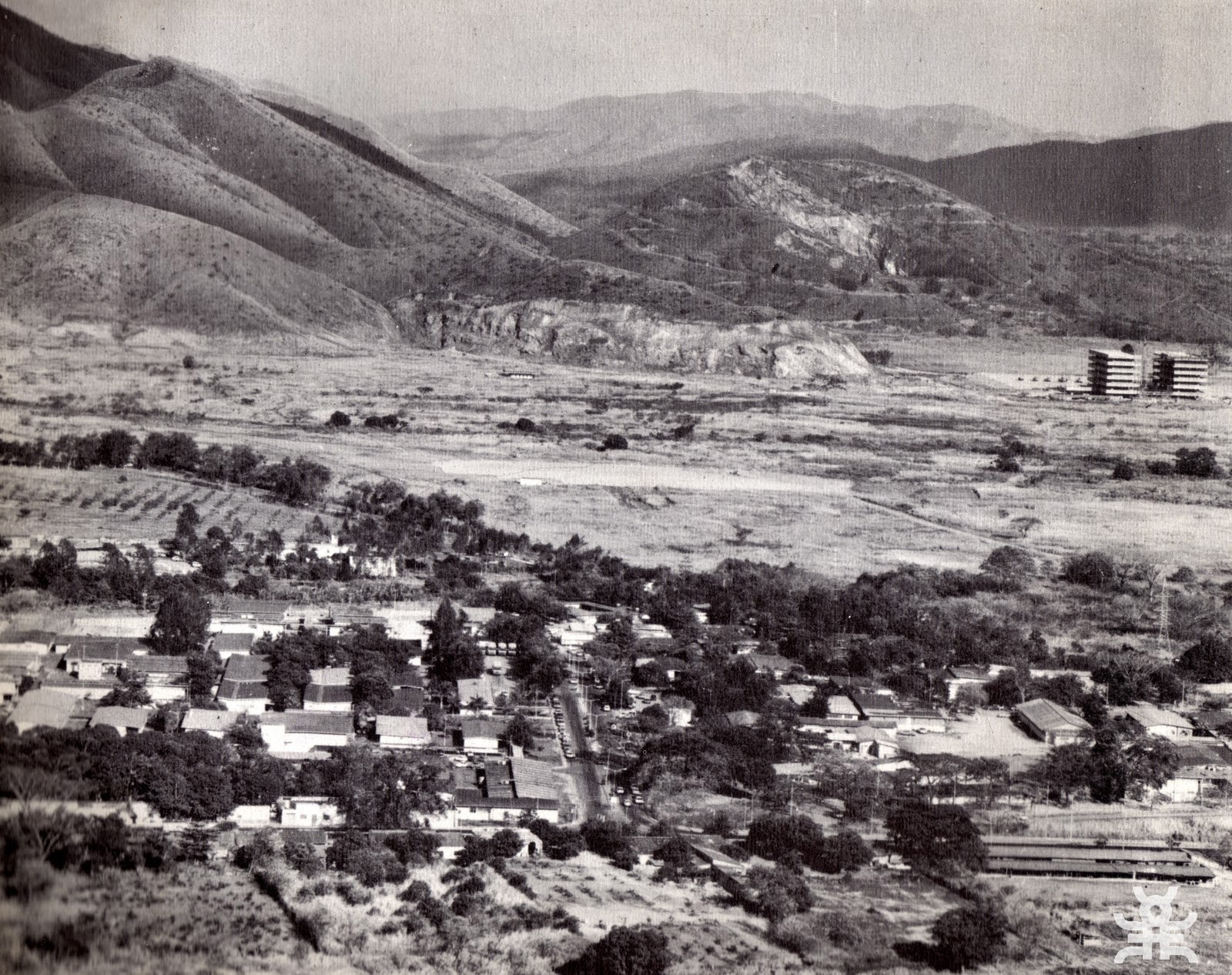
View of Bárbula in 1974.

During the late 19th and early 20th centuries, the Hato de Bárbula maintained its status as a prominent private estate, eventually coming under the ownership of General Eleazar López Contreras, who served as the President of Venezuela between 1935 and 1941. In 1941, following a strategic shift toward modernizing the nation's social infrastructure, the Carabobo state social assistance authorities acquired the lands from the former president with the intent of dedicating the vast area to large-scale public health projects. This acquisition marked the beginning of a new era for the locality, transitioning it from a rural agricultural site to a specialized institutional zone.

The most significant development of the mid-century was the creation of the Bárbula Sanitary City (Ciudad Sanitaria de Bárbula in spanish) during the 1950s. This ambitious governmental project aimed to establish a specialized medical hub for the central region of Venezuela, centralizing various clinical services. The centerpiece of this complex was the Bárbula Psychiatric Hospital, which was officially inaugurated in 1954 and is known today as the Hospital Psiquiátrico Dr. José Ortega Durán. At the time of its opening, it represented one of the most modern psychiatric facilities in the country and established a lasting healthcare legacy in the Naguanagua valley.

A definitive turning point occurred in 1958, when the Venezuelan government ceded the majority of the Bárbula lands for the permanent campus of the newly reopened University of Carabobo (Universidad de Carabobo in spanish). This move effectively transformed the old colonial estate into the Bárbula Campus, which became the university's primary administrative and academic seat. The establishment of the university acted as a powerful demographic catalyst, bringing thousands of students, professors, and staff to the area and home to the faculties of Engineering, Health Sciences, Science and Technology, and Education. Consequently, the influx of people led to the rapid urbanization of the surrounding valley, ...evolving Bárbula into a complex, high-density sector that integrates residential neighborhoods with the academic, scientific, and cultural heart of Carabobo State.

== Geography ==
=== Climate ===
Bárbula, like the rest of the Naguanagua, features a Tropical savanna climate (Aw) according to the Köppen climate classification. However, its specific location at the foot of the San Esteban National Park and surrounding peaks, such as Cerro El Café and Cerro Girardot, creates a slightly cooler microclimate compared to the lower areas of the Valencia valley. The locality is characterized by two distinct seasons: a rainy season from May to November and a dry season from December to April. The presence of the surrounding mountainous terrain contributes to orographic precipitation and provides a constant flow of fresh air from the mountains, maintaining average annual temperatures between 22 °C and 26 °C (71 °F – 79 °F).

Climate data for Climate data for Bárbula (Elevation: 450–550m), Naguanagua
Month	Jan	Feb	Mar	Apr	May	Jun	Jul	Aug	Sep	Oct	Nov	Dec	Year
Record high °C (°F)	34.0 (93.2)	35.0 (95.0)	37.0 (98.6)	37.0 (98.6)	35.0 (95.0)	34.0 (93.2)	33.0 (91.4)	33.0 (91.4)	34.0 (93.2)	34.0 (93.2)	34.0 (93.2)	33.0 (91.4)	37.0 (98.6)
Mean daily maximum °C (°F)	30.5 (86.9)	31.2 (88.2)	32.1 (89.8)	32.1 (89.8)	31.1 (88.0)	30.2 (86.4)	30.0 (86.0)	30.3 (86.5)	30.8 (87.4)	30.9 (87.6)	30.6 (87.1)	30.1 (86.2)	30.8 (87.5)
Daily mean °C (°F)	24.5 (76.1)	25.1 (77.2)	25.9 (78.6)	26.3 (79.3)	26.1 (79.0)	25.5 (77.9)	25.2 (77.4)	25.4 (77.7)	25.8 (78.4)	25.7 (78.3)	25.4 (77.7)	24.7 (76.5)	25.5 (77.8)
Mean daily minimum °C (°F)	18.5 (65.3)	18.9 (66.0)	19.8 (67.6)	20.6 (69.1)	21.0 (69.8)	20.8 (69.4)	20.5 (68.9)	20.5 (68.9)	20.7 (69.3)	20.5 (68.9)	20.2 (68.4)	19.3 (66.7)	20.1 (68.2)
Record low °C (°F)	14.0 (57.2)	15.0 (59.0)	15.0 (59.0)	17.0 (62.6)	18.0 (64.4)	18.0 (64.4)	17.0 (62.6)	17.0 (62.6)	18.0 (64.4)	18.0 (64.4)	17.0 (62.6)	15.0 (59.0)	14.0 (57.2)
Average precipitation mm (inches)	5.0 (0.20)	5.0 (0.20)	9.0 (0.35)	45.0 (1.77)	85.0 (3.35)	110.0 (4.33)	125.0 (4.92)	115.0 (4.53)	95.0 (3.74)	85.0 (3.35)	65.0 (2.56)	25.0 (0.98)	769 (30.28)
Average precipitation days (≥ 1.0 mm)	1.0	1.0	2.0	5.0	10.0	13.0	15.0	14.0	12.0	10.0	8.0	4.0	95
Source: INAMEH

== Culture ==
The cultural identity of Bárbula is shaped by the intersection of its academic environment, rooted in the University of Carabobo, and the traditional customs of its local communities. The area hosts a blend of institutional arts and grassroots religious expressions.

=== Arts and entertainment ===
A central pillar of the locality's cultural life is the theater Dr. Alfredo Celis Pérez (historically known as the Bárbula Amphitheater). Located within the University of Carabobo campus, this theater-auditorium is one of the most important cultural venues in Carabobo State. It was originally inaugurated on December 9, 1951, as part of the Bárbula Psychiatric Colony project, and was later rescued, remodeled, and re-inaugurated by the university on May 25, 1996. With a capacity of over 900 seats, it serves as the primary stage for national and international theatrical performances, symphonic concerts, and university graduation ceremonies.

=== Religion and traditions ===
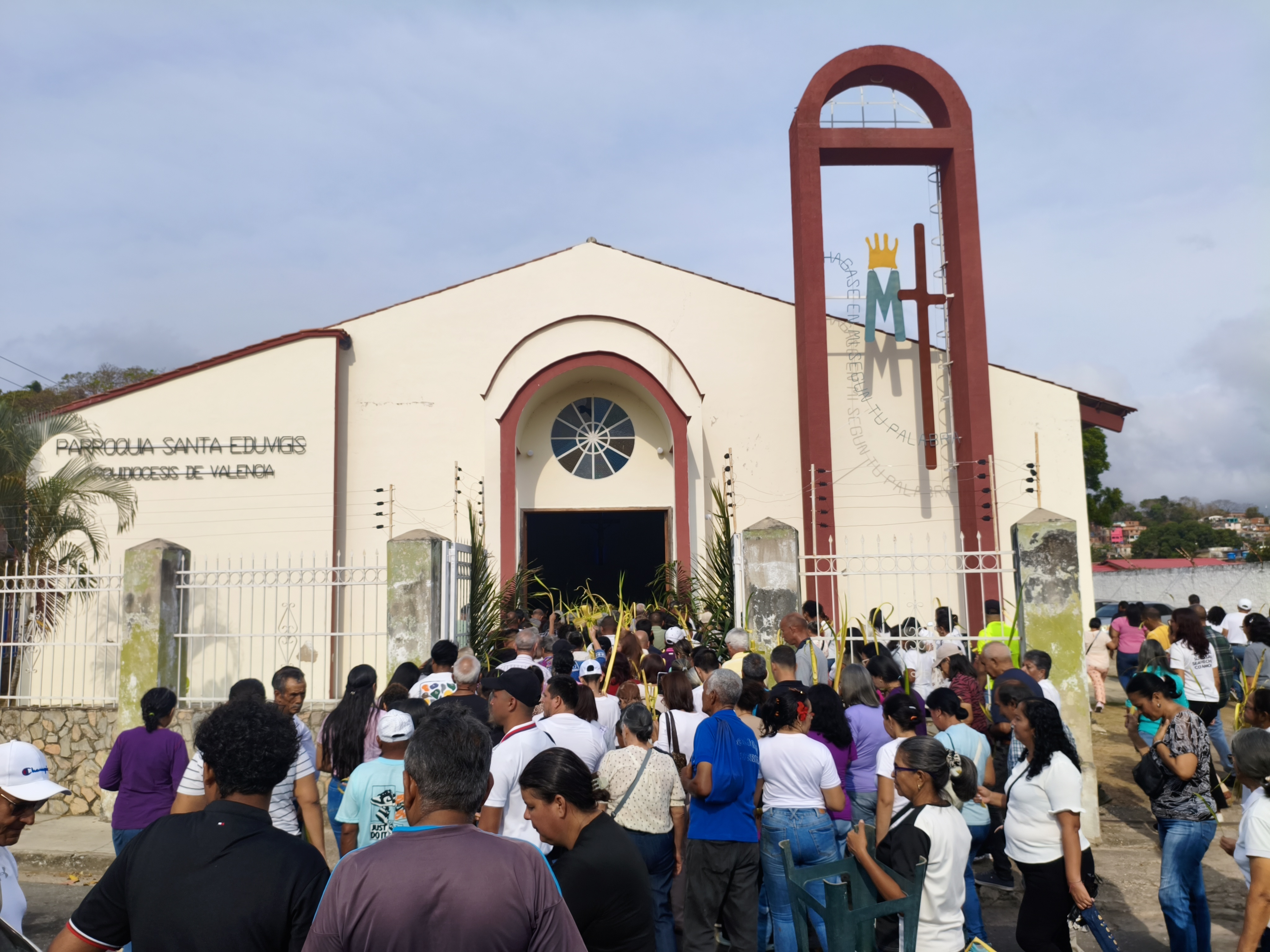
Parishioners gathered at the Santa Eduvigis Church during Palm Sunday.

Religious life in Bárbula reflects the broader demographics of Venezuela, with prominent Catholic and Evangelical communities. Local traditions are heavily tied to the liturgical calendar. During Holy Week, the community actively participates in processions and masses observances that take place across the locality's parishes.

Notable religious centers that serve as community hubs include the Santa Eduvigis Church (Iglesia Santa Eduvigis), which serves the Catholic faithful in the Vivienda Rural de Bárbula sector, and the Evangelical Assembly (Asamblea Evangélica) located in the Malagón neighborhood. These institutions not only function as places of worship but also organize social and cultural events for the residents.

== Education ==
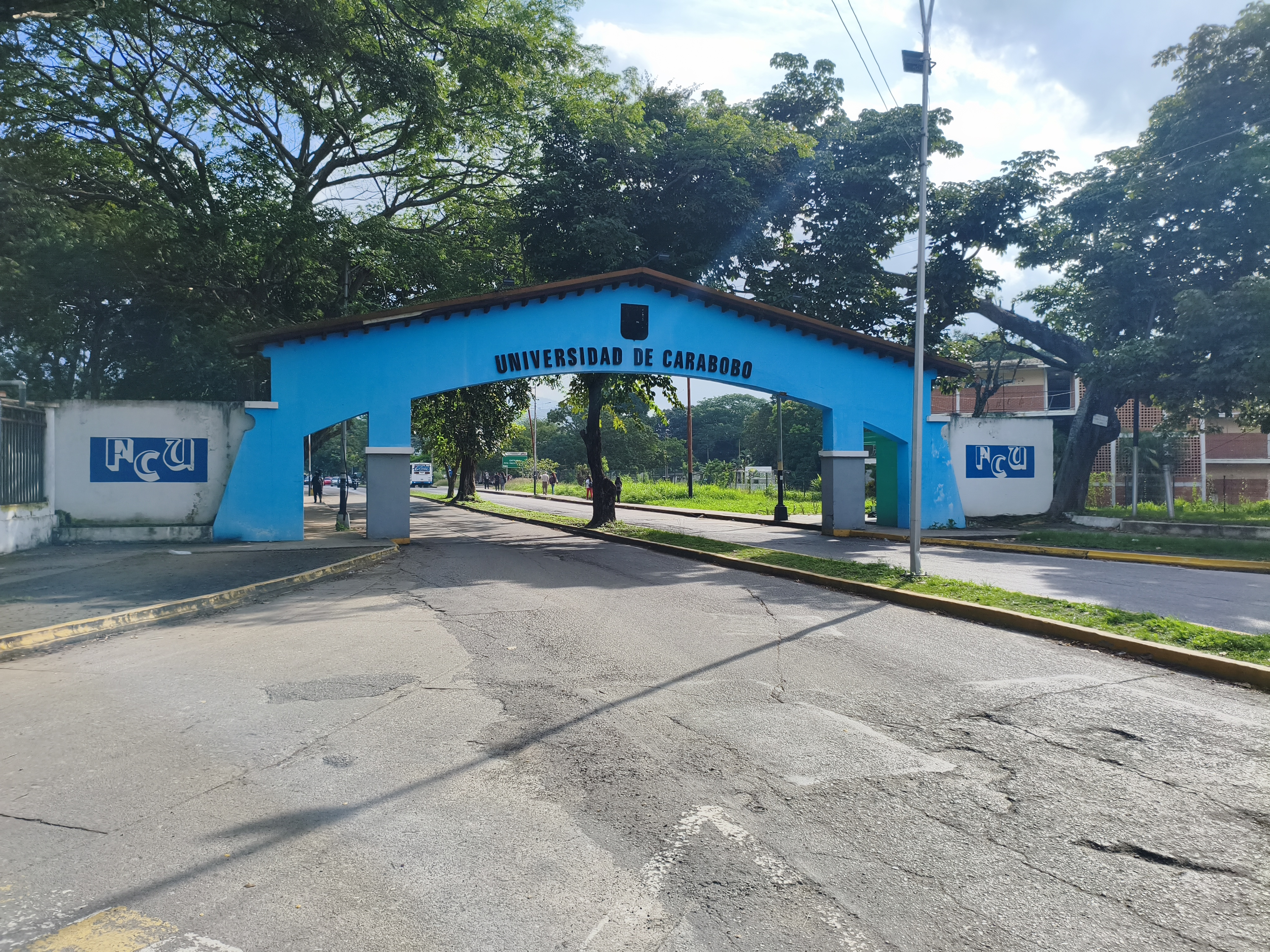
University of Carabobo

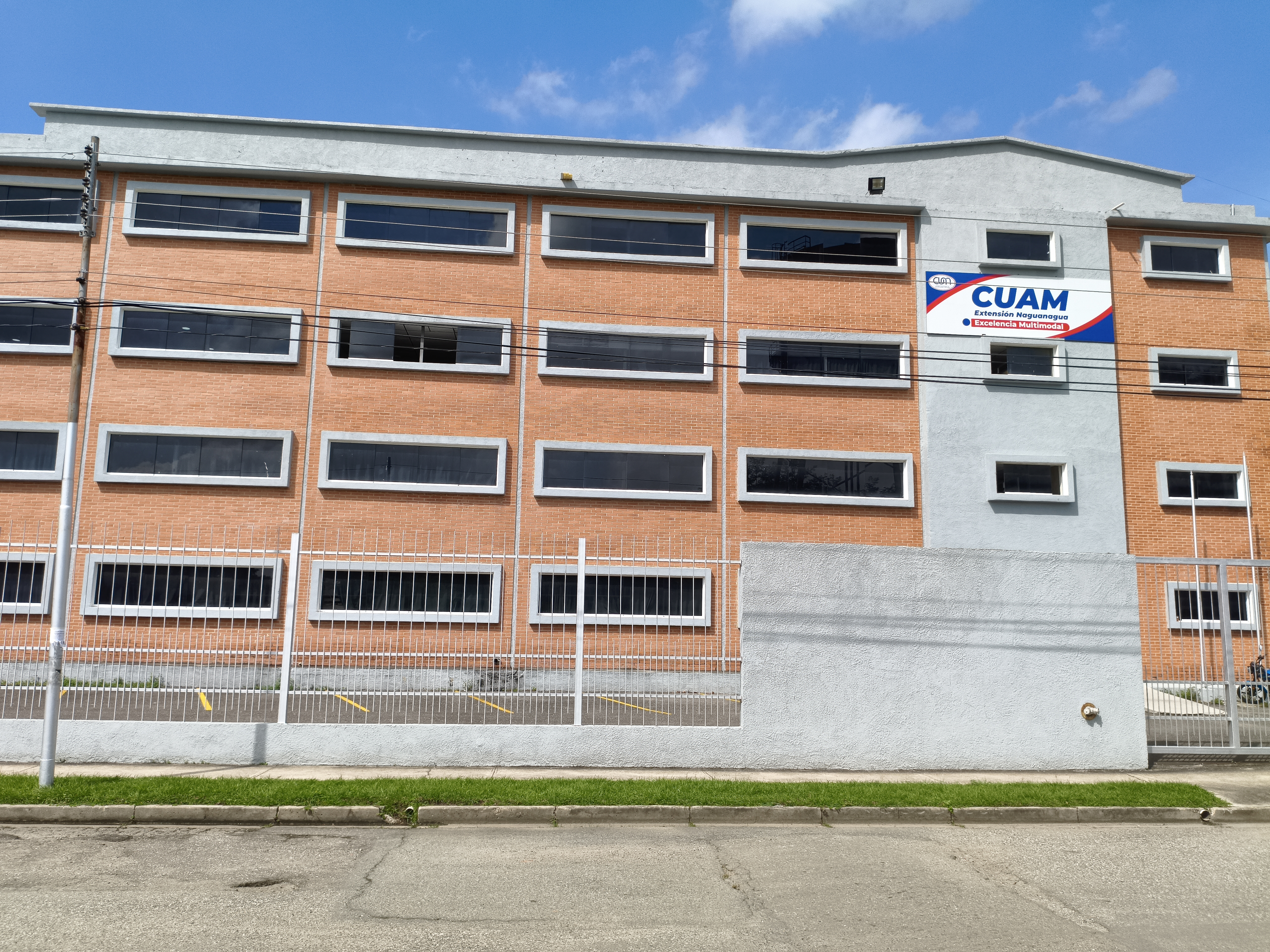
CUAM

=== Higher education ===
Bárbula is a prominent educational hub within the central region of Venezuela, primarily defined by the presence of major higher education institutions that generate a constant influx of students, faculty, and administrative personnel. The area's identity is inextricably linked to the University of Carabobo (UC), the most significant center of studies in the region. Although much of the main campus is formally situated along the municipal boundary, Bárbula serves as the primary gateway and residential center for a large portion of the university community, fostering a strong academic influence over the locality's social and economic life.

In addition to the public university system, the private sector is represented by the Colegio Universitario de Administración y Mercadeo (CUAM). Founded in 1971, CUAM has established a legacy of over half a century in professional training within the state. Originally created to offer technical degrees in response to labor market demands, the institution currently provides a variety of higher technical and bachelor's degrees, with a specialized emphasis on administration and marketing.

== Transportation ==
Bárbula serves as a significant road convergence point within Carabobo State, supported by a public transportation network that connects the locality with the rest of the municipality and the Greater Valencia area. The infrastructure is anchored by major regional highways, most notably the Guacara - Bárbula Bypass Highway, which is crucial for regional connectivity as it facilitates rapid transit to and from the eastern part of Carabobo.

Additionally, the East Highway provides a direct and essential link between the Naguanagua municipality and consequently Bárbula and the broader Valencia metropolitan area. For internal mobility, the Avenida Intercomunal de Bárbula functions as the primary thoroughfare, channeling local traffic, commercial activity, and municipal transport routes.

Furthermore, the area is the site of the Bárbula Tunnel, a major engineering project belonging to the national railway system (specifically the Ezequiel Zamora II line) designed to connect the port city of Puerto Cabello with La Encrucijada. At 7.8 kilometers (4.8 mi) in length, it was projected to be the longest railway tunnel in South America. However, despite years of construction, the project was never finished and remains incomplete. The works were largely halted and abandoned in the 2010s due to the country's economic crisis and unpaid debts to the international consortiums in charge of the infrastructure, leaving the tunnel and its surrounding railway network paralyzed.

== See also ==
- List of cities and towns in Venezuela
- Las Trincheras
- San Diego, Carabobo
