= Aguas Calientes River (Carabobo) =

Aguas Calientes
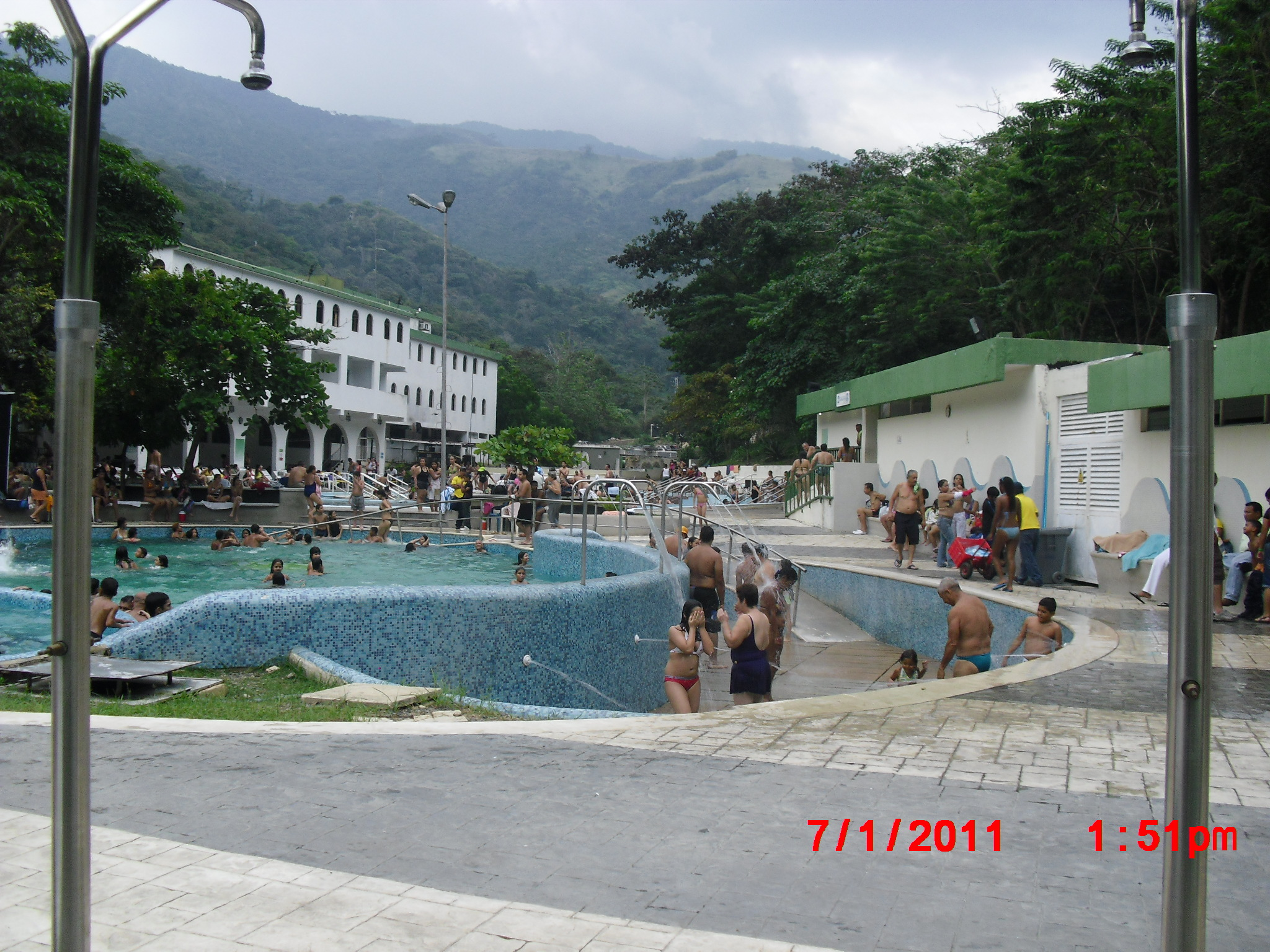
- The spa at Las Trincheras

Location
- Country: Venezuela
- State: Carabobo

Physical characteristics
- Source
  - location: Las Trincheras
- Mouth: Caribbean Sea
  - location: Near Puerto Cabello
  - coordinates: 10°28′55″N 68°06′41″W

Aguas Calientes ("hot waters" in Spanish) is the name of a river in Carabobo state.

== Source ==
The source is associated with the hot springs of Las Trincheras near Valencia.

=== Visit of Humboldt ===
The springs were visited in 1800 by Alexander von Humboldt, who measured the temperature. He then followed the river down to the Caribbean coast. Humboldt published a scientific description of the springs on his return to Europe. He concluded that they obtained their heat from very deep groundwater circulation.

== Railway ==
The Puerto Cabello and Valencia railway was built in the 1880s following the course of the valley for a considerable part of its route. It closed in the 1950s, but in the 21st century construction started on a new railway.

== Mouth ==
The river flows into the Caribbean west of Puerto Cabello.
