= Carlos Ignacio Urrea Arbeláez =

Colombian businessman (born 1966)

10th Colombia Ambassador to China
- Incumbent
- Assumed office 11 August 2011
- President: Juan Manuel Santos Calderón
- Preceded by: Guillermo Ricardo Vélez

Personal details
- Born: 1 January 1966 (age 60) Medellín, Antioquia, Colombia
- Spouse: Maryluz Escobar Penagos
- Children: Adelaida Urrea Escobar; Santiago Urrea Escobar
- Education: IE Business School (MIB)

Carlos Ignacio Urrea Arbeláez (born 1 January 1966) is the 10th and current Ambassador of Colombia to China. Before his diplomatic appointment he served in the private sector as President of Leonisa.

== Ambassadorship ==
On 7 March 2011 President Juan Manuel Santos Calderón announced the designation of Urrea as Ambassador Extraordinary and Plenipotentiary of Colombia to China replacing Guillermo Ricardo Vélez, and called it a "luxury designation". Urrea was sworn in on 19 May in a ceremony at the Palace of Nariño, and presented his Letters of Credence to Hu Jintao, President of China, on 11 August at the Great Hall of the People in Beijing.

== See also ==
- Dicken Fernando Panesso Serna
