= Girardot, Cundinamarca =

Town in Cundinamarca, Colombia

- Municipality and town
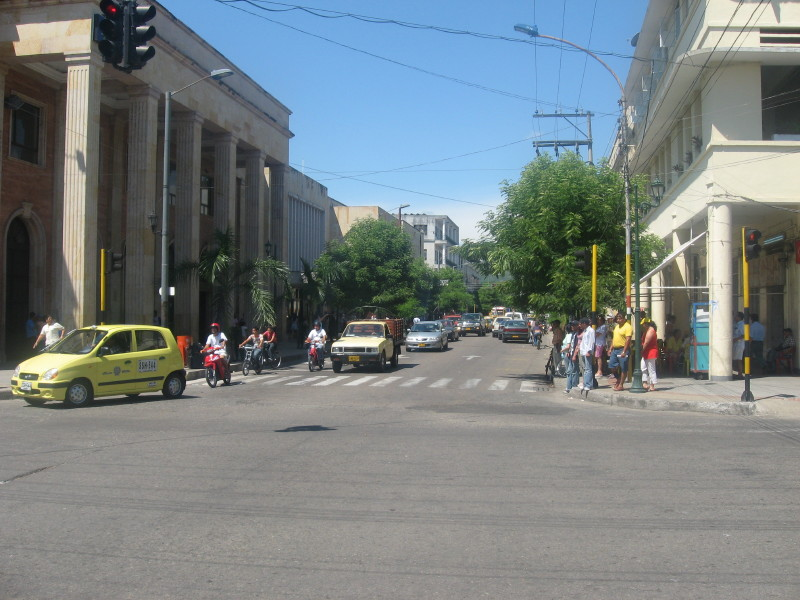
- Commerce strip

- Flag Coat of arms

- Localization in Cundinamarca, in Colombia

- Location in Colombia
- Coordinates: 4°18′18″N 74°48′06″W
- Country: Colombia
- Department: Cundinamarca
- Province: Upper Magdalena Province
- Established: 1852
- Named for: Atanasio Girardot

Government
  - Type: Mayor–council
  - Mayor: Jose Alejandro Arbeláez Cruz (L)
  - Council: Girardot City Council

Area
  - Municipality and town: 130.32 km^{2} (50.32 sq mi)
  - Urban (Note: POT (2011):The urban territory comprends: urban (2114.16hs) and expansion territory(146,16hs).): 22.6019 km^{2} (8.7266 sq mi)
  - Rural (Note: POT (2011): The rural territory comprends: suburban (636.31hs), rural (5053.07hs) and protection (5082.43hs)): 107.7181 km^{2} (41.5902 sq mi)
  - Metro: 355.42 km^{2} (137.23 sq mi)
- Elevation: 326 m (1,070 ft)
- Lowest elevation: 289 m (948 ft)

Population (2018 census)
  - Municipality and town: 101,018
  - Rank: 6th Cundinamarca; 59th Colombia
  - Density: 775.15/km^{2} (2,007.6/sq mi)
  - Urban: 95,427
  - Urban density: 4,222.1/km^{2} (10,935/sq mi)
  - Rural: 5,591
  - Rural density: 51.90/km^{2} (134.4/sq mi)
  - Metro: 142,288
  - Metro density: 400.34/km^{2} (1,036.9/sq mi)
- Demonym: Girardoteño
- Time zone: UTC-5 (COT)
  - Summer (DST): UTC-5 (COT)
- Postal code: 252430-252439
- Area code: 57 + 1
- Website: Official website

Girardot is a municipality and town of Colombia in the department of Cundinamarca. It is the second most important city of Cundinamarca according to its production. It is home to a number of recreational and vacational spots, mainly visited by people from Bogotá, as it is located at two hours drive from the city but enjoys a tropical climate (compared to the cold and rainy climate of Bogotá). The municipality had a population of 109,792 (2020 estimate), and form a small metropolitan area together with the neighbouring municipalities of Flandes and Ricaurte.

== History ==
In pre-Columbian times the municipality of Girardot was inhabited by a tribe of Indians called the "Panches" whose origins are unknown. The municipality began with the hamlet of "La Chivatera" (the goat farm) because it was very common in the area to raise goats. The hamlet was located in the jurisdiction of the municipality of Tocaima, of which documents exist dated 1840 calling it "paso de Flandes" (step of Flanders). Through the aforementioned hamlet runs the Magdalena river moving southwest towards the center of the country.

Due to its strategic position the area experienced steady growth, and thanks to the donation of land by Ramón Bueno and José Triana, the municipality was officially founded with the name of Girardot, in honor of General Atanasio Girardot. This was documented in the ordinance 20 on October 9, 1852 that says "… create a parish district with the name of Girardot…". The first mayor of the district was named Claudio Clavijo. The parish was created in 1866 (reviewed by the Cundinamarca Gazette No 407 of July 7, 1891), and was the first parish of priest José Marcelino Pardo.

The city began to develop in a grid pattern centered on San Miguel square, where a cathedral of the same name is located; whose architecture resembles that of the region.

The first hotel in the city was built in 1884 to accommodate the constant flow of travelers and merchants and was named the Cisneros Hotel. Two years after the hotel was finished the population of the port was recorded as 2,163. As a result of the Thousand Days' War a large number of liberal refugees from the south and east of Tolima settled on land in the area.

== Geography ==
The municipality lies on a plain, framed by the foothills of the Cordillera Oriental, without notable topographic features, with some areas of difficult access in the mountainous area on the border with Nariño called Alonso Vera cordillera.

=== Hydrography ===
Girardot has drainage basins and watersheds. The upper basin of the Magdalena River becomes the water resources of greater magnitude in a vast area of the country and the Bogotá River downstream. The basins located in the municipality are called El Cobre, Chicalá, Miraflores, El Gallo and ditches that collect rainwater from the top of the city, have shallow valleys and extension, unlike the micro basins Coyal, Zanja Honda, Quebrada Portachuelo and Yegüera that are deep and greater extent.

=== Climate ===
The Köppen Climate Classification subtype for Giradot's climate is "Aw" (Tropical Wet and Dry Climate), with generally hot conditions throughout the course of the year. Average temperature is 28 °C, with maximum of 38 °C and minimum of 23 °C. It has a bimodal pluviometric regimen with an average precipitation of 1167 mm per year.

The dry periods are on the months of January and February; June, July and August; and September and December. Rainy months are in the months of March, April and May, and October and November.

The warmest month, on average, is August with an average temperature of 30 °C (86.0 °F). The coolest month on average is May, with an average temperature of 27.2 °C (81.0 °F).

Climate data for Girardot (Santiago Vila Airport), elevation 283 m (928 ft), (1981–2010)
Month	Jan	Feb	Mar	Apr	May	Jun	Jul	Aug	Sep	Oct	Nov	Dec	Year
Mean daily maximum °C (°F)	34.3 (93.7)	34.3 (93.7)	33.8 (92.8)	32.8 (91.0)	32.6 (90.7)	33.2 (91.8)	34.4 (93.9)	35.5 (95.9)	34.6 (94.3)	33.1 (91.6)	32.5 (90.5)	33.1 (91.6)	33.7 (92.7)
Daily mean °C (°F)	28.8 (83.8)	28.9 (84.0)	28.7 (83.7)	28.1 (82.6)	27.8 (82.0)	27.9 (82.2)	28.8 (83.8)	29.3 (84.7)	28.9 (84.0)	28.1 (82.6)	27.8 (82.0)	28.1 (82.6)	28.4 (83.2)
Mean daily minimum °C (°F)	23.3 (73.9)	23.5 (74.3)	23.5 (74.3)	23.4 (74.1)	23.1 (73.6)	22.6 (72.7)	22.2 (72.0)	23.0 (73.4)	23.2 (73.8)	23.1 (73.6)	23.1 (73.6)	23.1 (73.6)	23.1 (73.6)
Average precipitation mm (inches)	49.3 (1.94)	84.6 (3.33)	117.7 (4.63)	183.2 (7.21)	157.6 (6.20)	64.3 (2.53)	36.3 (1.43)	41.8 (1.65)	121.3 (4.78)	158.9 (6.26)	110.1 (4.33)	88.6 (3.49)	1,213.7 (47.78)
Average precipitation days	9	12	14	17	16	13	12	10	14	16	15	12	158
Average relative humidity (%)	66	66	68	73	75	71	64	58	64	71	75	71	68
Mean monthly sunshine hours	207.7	172.2	167.4	162.0	176.7	180.0	198.4	198.4	186.0	189.1	183.0	198.4	2,219.3
Mean daily sunshine hours	6.7	6.1	5.4	5.4	5.7	6.0	6.4	6.4	6.2	6.1	6.1	6.4	6.1
Source: Instituto de Hidrologia Meteorologia y Estudios Ambientales

== Economy ==
Girardot is an important city in the department of Cundinamarca, due to its decentralized and autonomous economy, and because of its reputation as an excellent tourist destination. The main economy of Girardot is based on tourism and it boasts many waterparks, resorts, hotels and clubs, such as Peñalisa, El Peñon, El Bachué, and the Hotel Tocarema. Girardot is also famous regionally for the quality of its bread. Because it is only a short drive from Bogotá (about 2 hours), it is a popular weekend hangout.

== Born in Girardot ==
- Juan Alfredo Pinto Saavedra, former Colombian ambassador to India
- Marta Gomez, singer and songwriter
- Charlie Zaa, singer.
- Gustavo Bolivar, author, screenwriter, journalist and senator.
