= Cristóbal Rojas (artist) =

Venezuelan painter

- Cristóbal Rojas Poleo
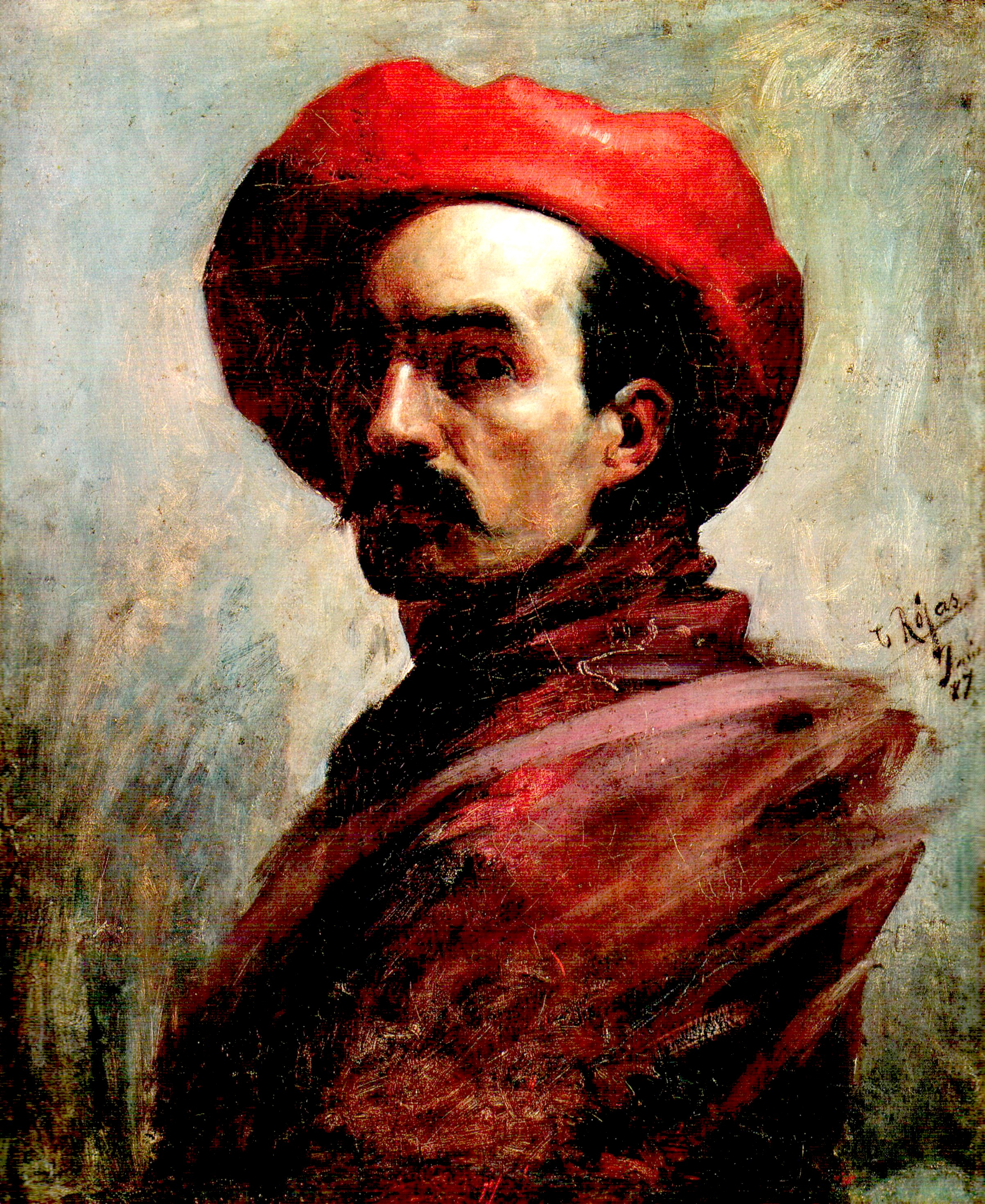
- Self-portrait, 1887
- Born: Cristóbal Rojas Poleo; December 15, 1857; Cúa, Valles del Tuy, Venezuela
- Died: November 8, 1890 (aged 32); Caracas, Venezuela
- Education: Universidad Central de Venezuela
- Known for: Historical painting, genre scenes, portraiture
- Notable work: La muerte de Girardot en Bárbula (1883), El violinista enfermo (1886), El plazo vencido (1887), El bautizo (1889), El Purgatorio (1890)
- Style: Post-romanticism, Impressionism, academic realism
- Movement: 19th-century Venezuelan art
- Awards: Silver Medal, Salón del Centenario; 1883

Cristóbal Rojas Poleo (December 15, 1857 – November 8, 1890) was one of the most important and high-profile Venezuelan painters of the 19th century. Rojas's styles varied considerably throughout his life and ranged from the post-romantic to the impressionist style, but most of his works was characterised by realism.

== Biography ==
Cristóbal Rojas Poleo was born in the city of Cúa in the Valles del Tuy to parents who worked in the medical profession. Part of his childhood occurred during the middle of the federal war (1859–1863) and Cúa was particularly affected by the events of the war. He initiated studies under his grandfather, José Luis Rojas, who taught him how to draw and motivated him to improve. At 13 years old, his father died and he was forced to begin work in a tobacco factory in Cúa to help support his family. In 1878, an earthquake devastated the Valles del Tuy region, and the Rojas faced poverty. As a result, he moved to Caracas where he continued his painting studies, despite again having to work in the tobacco industry to support his mother and family.

In Caracas he attended classes by José Manuel Maucó at the Universidad Central de Venezuela. Between 1880 and 1882, he developed a keen interest in oils and displayed a primitive technique that would prevail in his later paintings such as Ruinas de Cúa después del Terremoto and Ruinas del templo de la Merced. During this time he became acquainted with the painter Antonio Herrera Toro, also coming under contract as Toro's assistant to paint Caracas Cathedral.

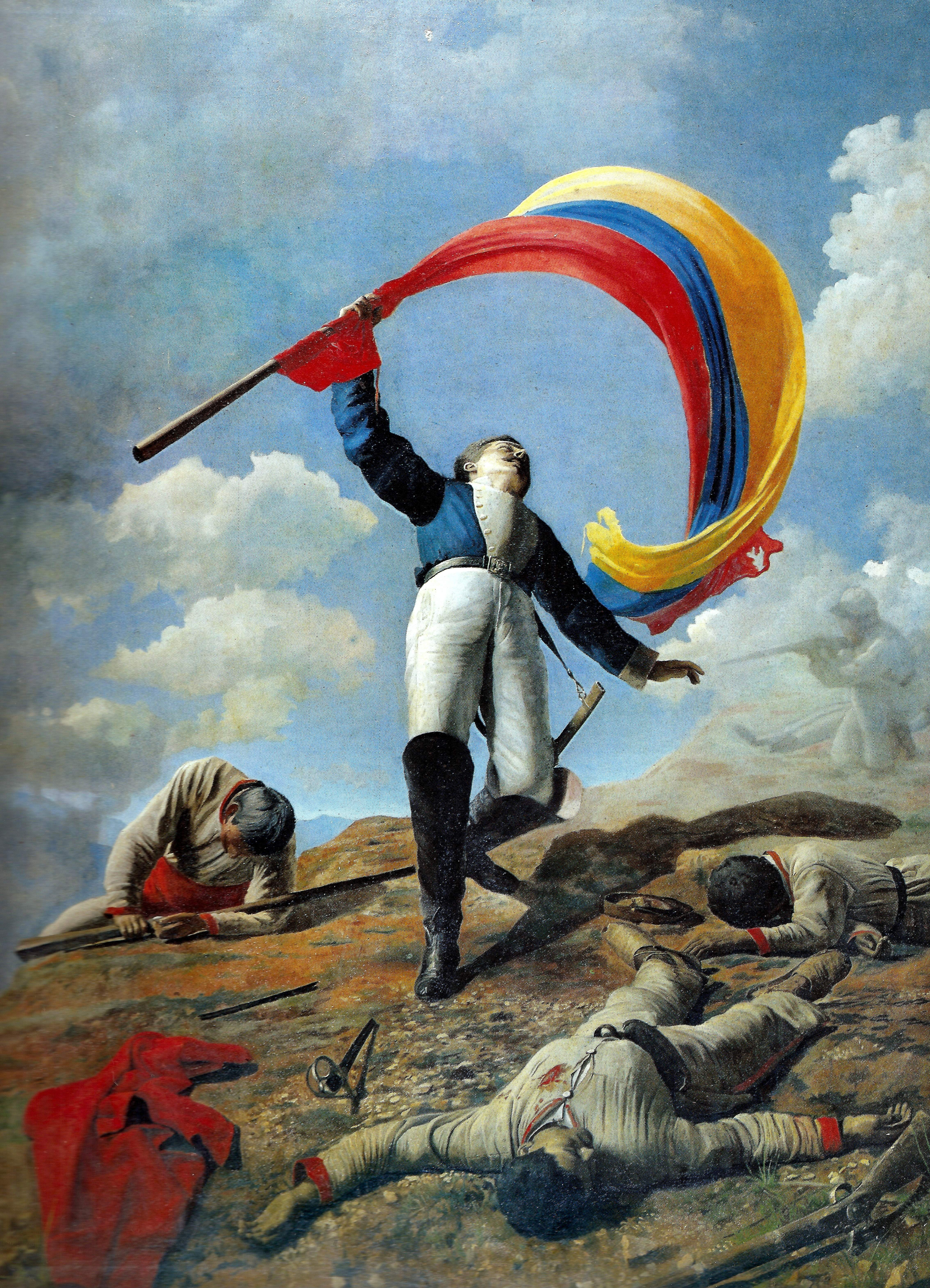
Rojas' La muerte de Girardot en Bárbula which won him a silver medal and scholarship in 1883. 287 x 217 cm.

In 1883, Rojas exhibited his La muerte de Girardot en Bárbula (The death of Girardot in Bárbula) in the Salón del Centenario to commemorate the birth of Simon Bolivar and won a silver medal in second place along with the painter Arturo Michelena. This award would grant him a scholarship by government amounting to 50 pesos each month, to study in Europe. In early 1884 he had moved to study in Paris where he established a friendship with Emilio Boggio. In the period between 1883 and 1890 Rojas would experiment slowly with different pictorial tendencies and techniques ranging from post-romanticism to impressionism.

Melancholic, and with an uncertain temperament, Rojas was inspired by examples of artwork he discovered on his continuous visits to the Louvre. Between 1886 and 1889 he exhibited many paintings in the Paris City Hall, including La miseria (1886); El violinista enfermo (1886); La taberna (1887); El plazo vencido (1887); La primera y última comunión (1888) and El bautizo (1889).

With El Bautizo, a notable change in his work is observed. With a more acute perception of chromatic atmosphere, the painting displayed clear Dutch influences, a style which was also reflected in a later painting he produced in 1889 Dante y Beatriz a orillas del Leteo. Towards the end of 1889, Rojas moved away from the painting of dramatic effects which he had typically displayed at Paris Hall, and began to display talent for scenes and portraits, using colours and paying attention to details with impressionism. However, the subsidies for his scholarship would soon run out, and he became plagued with tuberculosis. He was forced to return to Venezuela in 1890, bringing with himself his last paintings, a portrait of President Juan Pablo Rojas Paúl and The Purgatorio, a depiction of purgatory (both 1890). Soon after his return to Caracas, he died on November 8 of 1890, at age 32.

== Personality ==
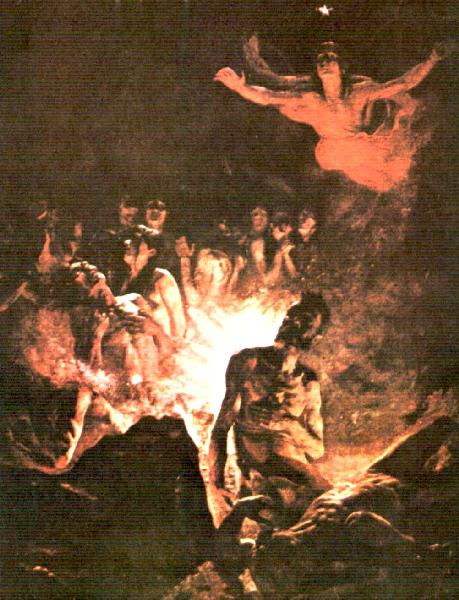
Rojas' El Purgatorio, a depiction of purgatory, painted shortly before his death in 1890. 339 x 256 cm.

Journalist Ermelindo Rivodó who visited Rojas in Paris in 1885, described the painter as "Somewhat pale, with small moustache and black hair, that emphasize his smooth set of melancholic eyes".

Rojas was known for his reserved but highly passionate nature, rarely socialising with others around him and preferring to study art in his own medium. Peers and artistic commentators have consistently referred to him as "melancholic". Jose Antonio Hedderich, in an interesting article published in the National Magazine of Culture, after studying the life of Rojas described him; "He was of a shy character, that one was aware of the distance that existed between him and those who surrounded to him. He had few friends". However, Hedderich also continues to identify that Rojas was of a highly emotional nature. Once remarking that, "He had almost fatalistic temperament and was emphatically sad". According to Hedderich, Rojas was embittered by excessive guilty feelings about life and was acutely aware of his conscience. These feelings were often reflected in some of his works such as his purgatory painting, painted shortly before his death in the knowledge he was going to die from tuberculosis.

== Gallery of paintings ==
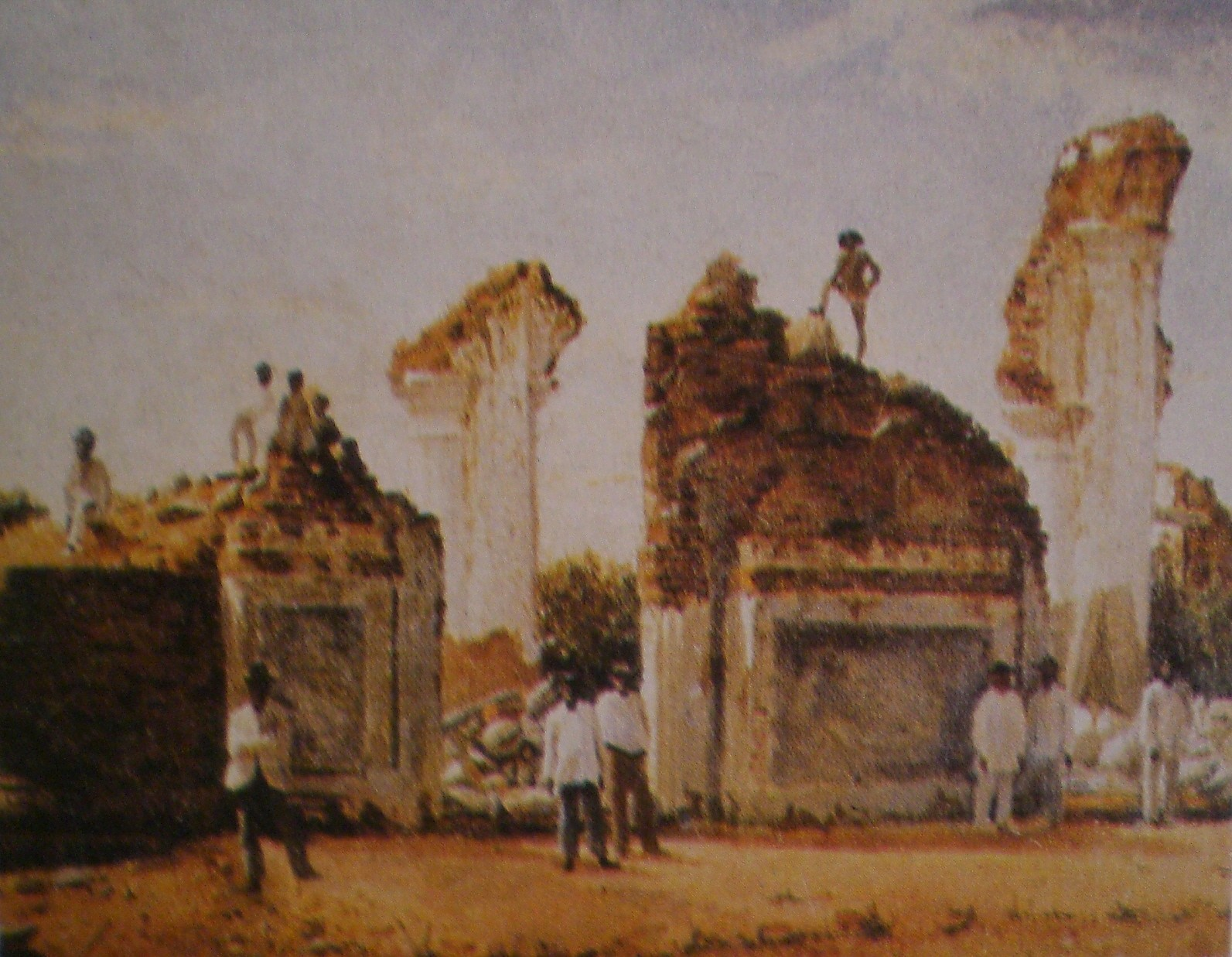
Ruinas de Cúa después del Terremoto (1882)

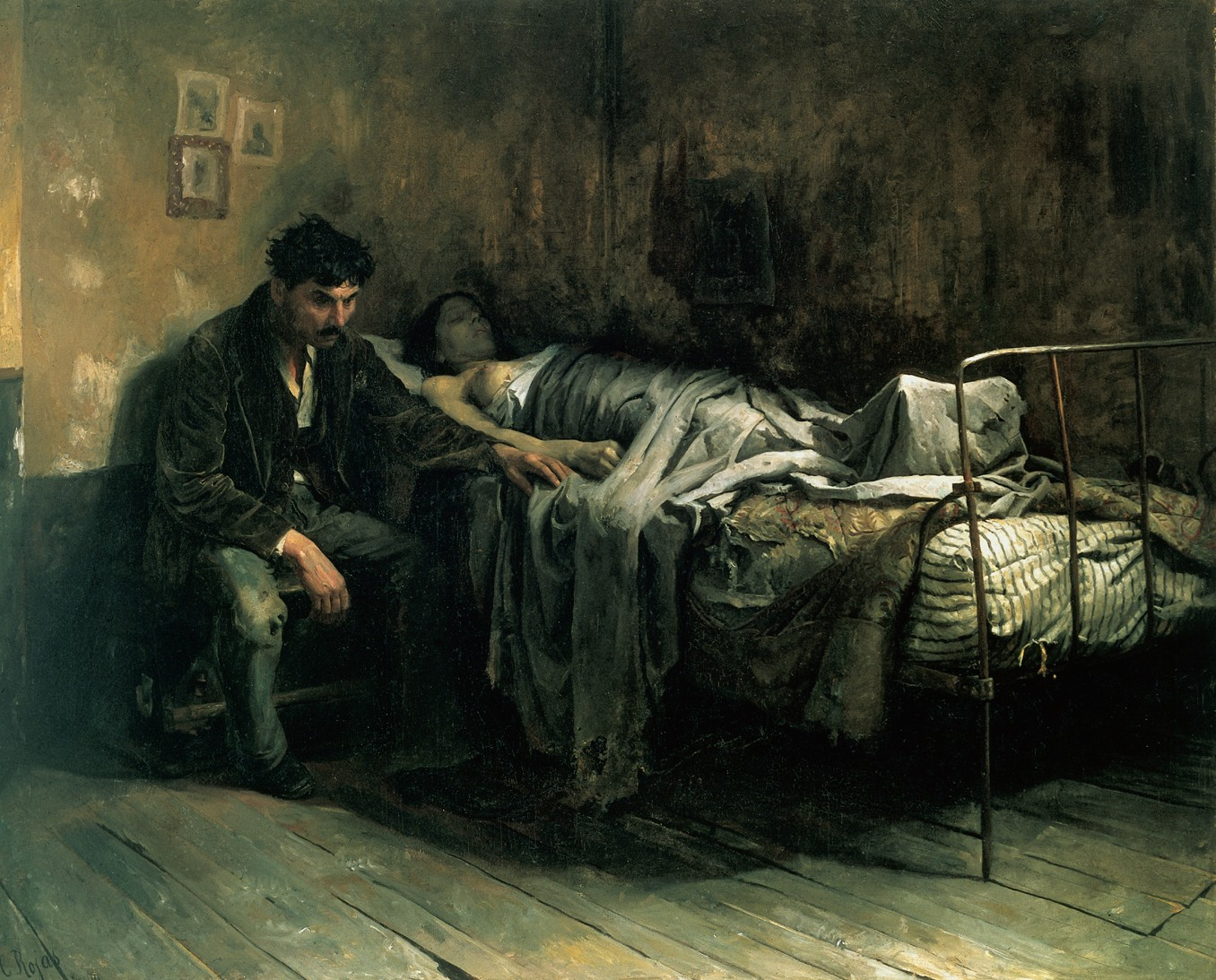
La miseria (1886). 180,4 x 221,4 cm.

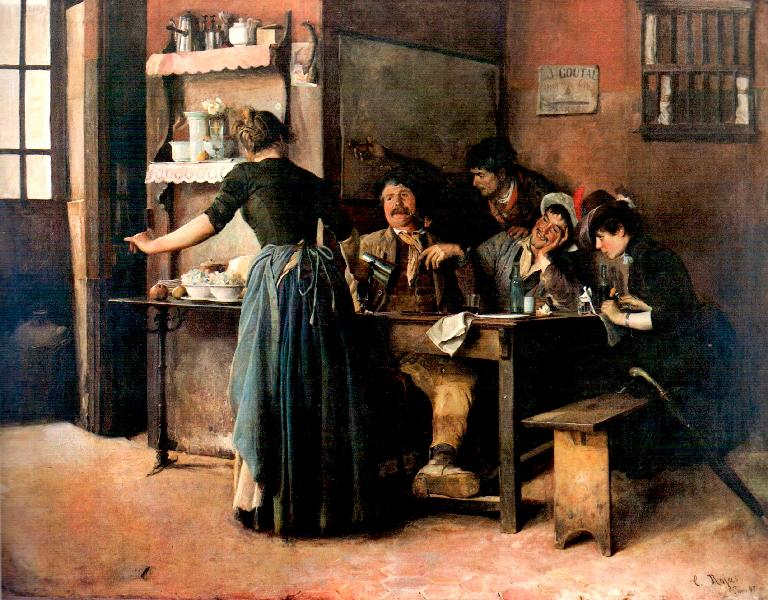
La taberna (1887). 212 x 272 cm.

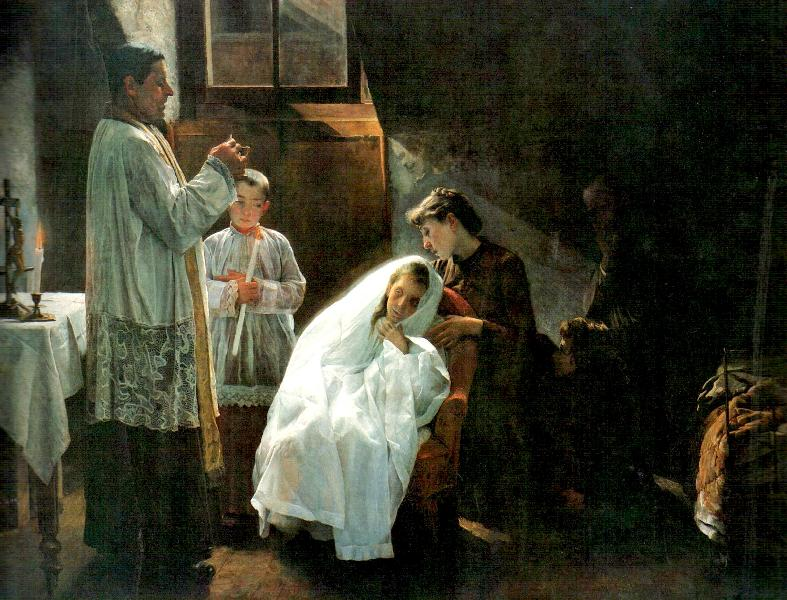
La primera y última comunión (1888). 200 x 250,5 cm.

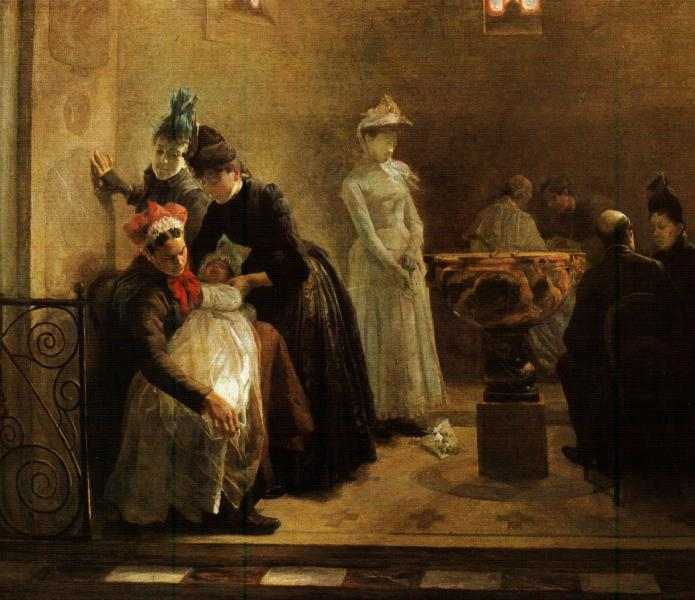
El bautizo (1889).148 x 176 cm.

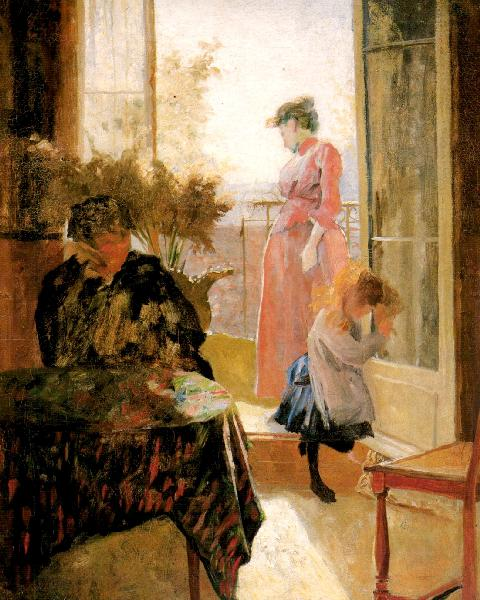
Estudio para el balcón (1889).73 x59,5 cm.

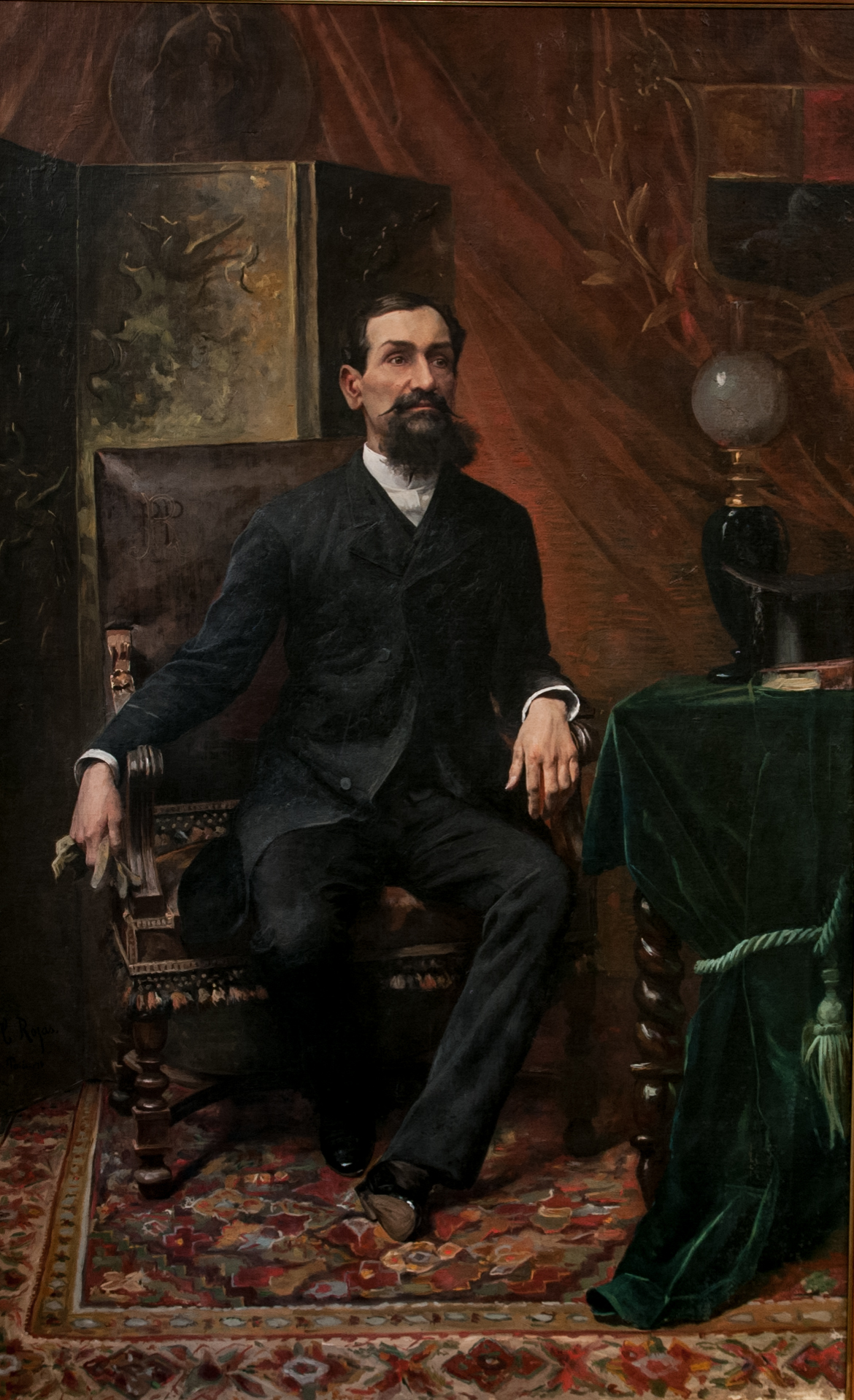
Retrato del Presidente Rojas Paúl (1890). 200 x 128,3 cm.

== See also ==
- Arthur Rimbaud
