= Las Trincheras =

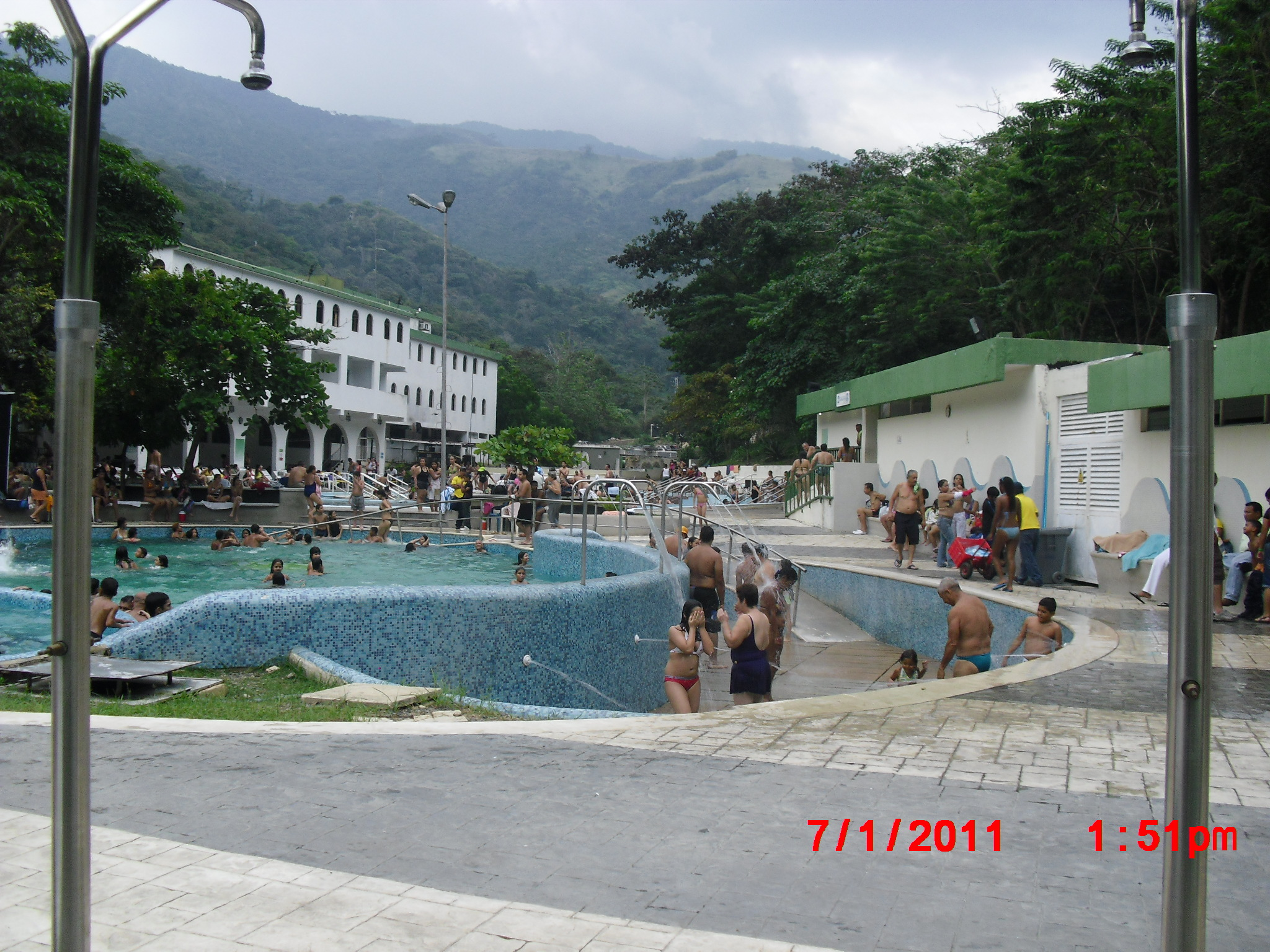
- The spa at Las Trincheras

- Location within Venezuela
- Coordinates: 10°18′N 68°04′W
- Country: Venezuela
- State: Carabobo
- Municipality: Naguanagua Municipality
- Time zone: UTC−4 (VST)

Las Trincheras, also known as Las Trincheras de Aguas Calientes, is a locality near Valencia, Venezuela. It is noted for its hot springs, which feed into the Aguas Calientes River. Tourism literature sometimes refers to them being among the hottest in the world, although there is not a verified ranking of hot springs. The name Trincheras (Spanish for "trenches") is said to derive from fortifications constructed in the colonial era.

== History ==
=== Visit of Humboldt ===
The springs were visited by Alexander von Humboldt in 1800 during his expedition to the American tropics. The springs were known to the locals: Humboldt observed sick people taking steam baths there.

Humboldt was puzzled by the springs because there was no evidence of vulcanism in the area to explain what was heating the water. Humboldt was able to confirm that the water was exceptionally hot for a non-geyser system of hot springs: he recorded the temperature as 90.3 °C (194.5 °F). On his return to Europe, Humboldt made Las Trincheras known to science. He got to know François Arago whose work on the geothermal gradient helped Humboldt to develop the idea that the springs obtained their heat from very deep groundwater circulation.

=== Battle of Las Trincheras ===
Las Trincheras is also noted for a battle which took place in October 1813 during the Venezuelan War of Independence. The Spanish commander Juan Domingo de Monteverde was wounded in the battle which was won by the Independentist forces. The Spanish retreated to their fortified base at Puerto Cabello.

=== Railway infrastructure ===

The development of the springs as a resort (balneario in Spanish) was given a boost by the inauguration of the Puerto Cabello and Valencia Railway in 1888. A station was opened at Las Trincheras, but the railway closed in the 1950s as road transport became more important in Venezuela.

In the 21st century work started on a new railway connecting Puerto Cabello to La Encrucijada in Aragua. Among the tunnels on the line is the 7,702 m Bárbula Tunnel, between Las Trincheras and Naguanagua. It has been described as the longest in South America, but as at 2026 work on the line has been abandoned.
