= Fernando Panesso Serna =

Colombian businessman and politician (born 1951)

Dicken Fernando Panesso Serna

Governor of Antioquia
- In office 29 May 1987 – 22 August 1988
- President: Virgilio Barco Vargas
- Preceded by: Antonio Yepes Parra
- Succeeded by: Antonio Roldán Betancur

Colombia Ambassador to Turkey
- In office 16 November 2011 – May 2015
- President: Juan Manuel Santos Calderón
- Preceded by: Freddy Padilla de León

Colombia Ambassador to Ecuador
- In office June 2015 – 11 September 2017
- President: Juan Manuel Santos Calderón

Personal details
- Born: 13 December 1951 (age 74) Pereira, Risaralda, Colombia
- Spouse: Patricia Gómez Correa
- Children: Juan David Panesso Gómez; Tomás Panesso Gómez; Santiago Panesso Gómez
- Education: National University of Colombia (BE, 1977)
- Profession: Management Engineer

Dicken Fernando Panesso Serna (born 13 December 1951) is a Colombian businessman and politician who served as the Ambassador of Colombia to several nations, including Turkey and Ecuador, during the 2010s.

== Ambassadorship ==
On 19 September 2011 President Juan Manuel Santos Calderón designated him Ambassador of Colombia to Turkey, and was sworn in on 4 November at a ceremony in the Palace of Nariño. He Presented his Letters of Credence to President Abdullah Gül at the Çankaya Köşkü on 16 November 2011.

== See also ==
- Carlos Ignacio Urrea Arbeláez
