= Atanasio Girardot =

Colombian revolutionary

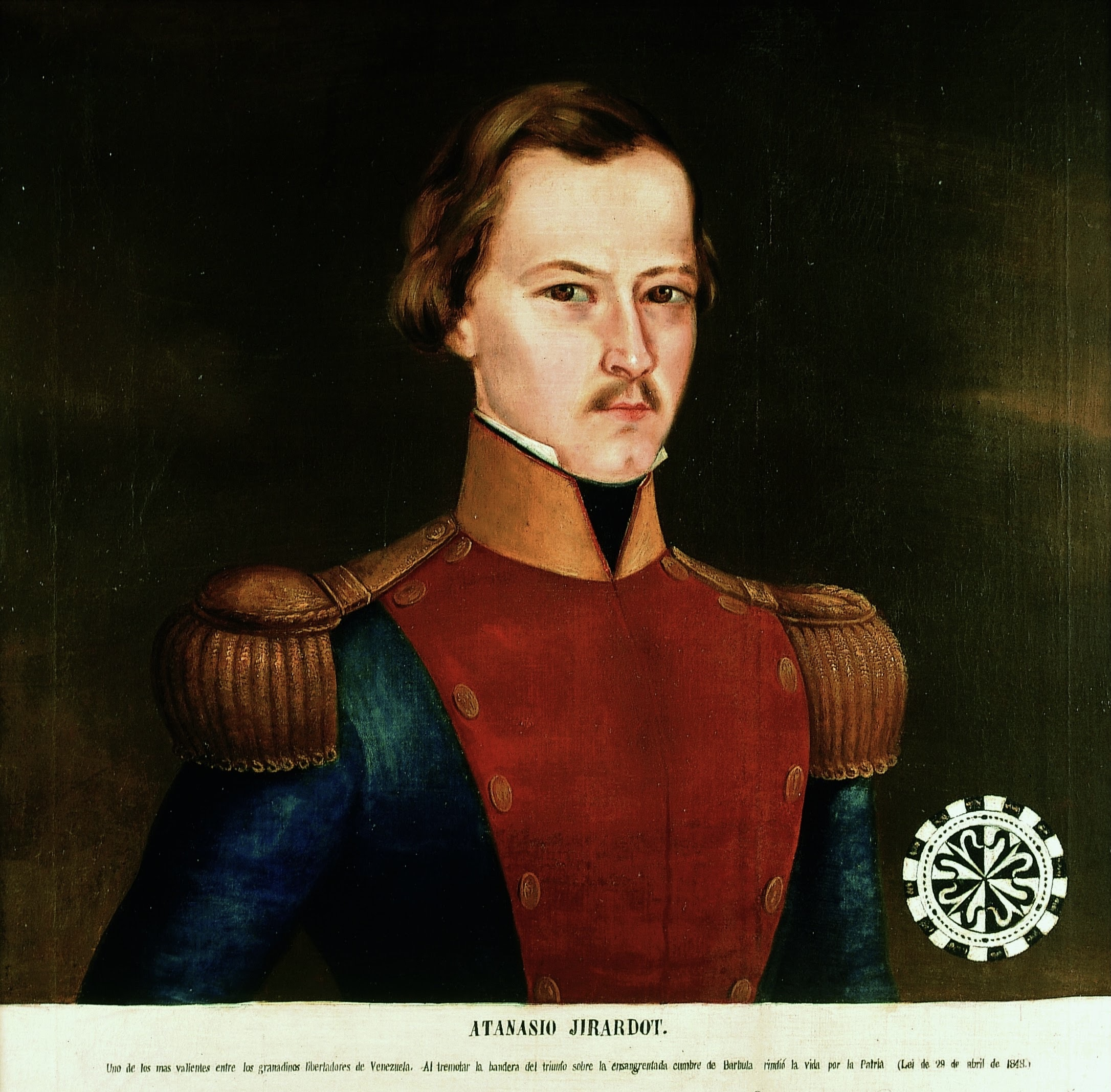
- Posthumous portrait of Girardot by José María Espinosa circa 1848.
- Born: Manuel Atanasio Girardot Díaz; May 2, 1791; San Jerónimo, Antioquia Province, Viceroyalty of New Granada
- Died: September 30, 1813 (aged 22); Bárbula Hil, Bárbula, Naguanagua, Venezuela
- Military career
- Allegiance: Spain (until 1810); United Provinces of New Granada
- Branch: Spanish Army; Army of the Union
- Service years: 1805-1813
- Rank: Colonel
- Unit: Auxiliary Infantry Battalion of Santafé
- Conflicts: Colombian war of Independence; Venezuelan War of Independence

Manuel Atanasio Girardot Díaz (French: [atanazjo ʒiʁaʁdo]; May 2, 1791 – September 30, 1813) was a Neogranadine military officer and one of the heroes of the Colombian and Venezuelan wars of Independence. He is famous for having died during the Battle of Bárbula, trying to plant the republican flag on Bárbula Hill.

The son of Louis Girardot, a wealthy merchant and French miner, Girardot joined the Spanish Army as a cadet in the Auxiliary battalion of Santafé. He joined the patriots along with his unit after the Revolt of July 20, 1810, which led to the start of the Colombian War of Independence. Girardot took part in the first battle of the Colombian War of Independence, the Battle of Bajo Palacé, on March 28, 1811. He distinguished himself in the battle, leading the vanguard, and earned a promotion to captain as a result of his actions.

Girardot later participated in the New Granada civil war of 1812, switching sides from the centralist army to the federalist army. In 1813, he was assigned to Brigadier Simón Bolívar's army during the Admirable Campaign, where he participated with distinction in numerous battles fought in Venezuela. At the Battle of Bárbula, he led the assault on the Spanish positions on the hill, achieving success. However, as he attempted to plant the republican flag on Bárbula Hill, he was struck by a gunshot to the heart, killing him instantly.

Girardot's death was deeply mourned by patriots in both New Granada and Venezuela. Simón Bolívar himself issued a lengthy decree in his honor, ordering that Girardot's remains be taken triumphantly to Caracas and that his family be granted a lifelong pension. In recognition of his bravery, Bolívar also decreed that a battalion within the patriot army should always bear Girardot's name—a tradition that has been upheld to this day in both the Colombian and Venezuelan armies.

== Early life ==
Manuel Atanasio Girardot Díaz was born on May 2, 1791, in the town of San Jerónimo, in the Antioquía Province of the Viceroyalty of New Granada. Five days later he was taken to the chapel of La Candeleria in the city of Medellín where he was baptized. His father was Frenchmen Louis Girardot who was born in Paris on June 23, 1752; he immigrated to Spain and joined the Spanish army serving in the Walloon Guards Regiment; after serving some time he immigrated to New Granada in Spanish America. There he married María Josefa Díaz de Hoyos with whom he had Atanasio, their first child.

In 1801 the family moved from Antioquía to the capital of the viceroyalty; Santafé de Bogotá. On December 12, 1801, Louis Girardot was given Spanish citizenship by royal decree of the king of Spain Charles IV in recognition of his services in the Spanish army as well as the recommendations provided by the high society of New Granada. Spanish citizenship meant that young Atanasio would now be able to get an education, thus he was subsequently enrolled in Colegio Mayor de Nuestra Señora del Rosario. It is not known when he was exactly admitted but it is known that he culminated his studies in October 1810 earning a degree in Philosophy and Civil Law.

While studying at the Colegio del Rosario, Girardot followed the footsteps of his father and enlisted in the Spanish army as a cadet in the Auxiliary Infantry battalion of Santafé (Spanish: Batallón Auxiliar de Santafé); the main garrison force of the viceregal capital.

== War of Independence ==
On July 20, 1810, the criollos of Santafé sparked a popular revolt aimed at establishing a governing junta. This uprising ultimately ignited the Colombian War of Independence, leading to the fight for New Granada's independence (modern-day Colombia). The revolt resulted in the removal of the viceroy and most of the royal government. Spanish army units stationed in the city also joined the revolt and pledged allegiance to the newly established Supreme Junta of Santafé. Their Spanish commander, along with other royal officials, was arrested and exiled. At the time of the revolt, Girardot served as a lieutenant in the Auxiliary Battalion.

In late 1810, the patriots who had established a junta in the Cauca Valley in southern New Granada requested assistance from the Santafé junta, as they faced a threat from the Spanish governor of Popayán, who planned to march against them and dissolve the junta by force. In response, the Santafé junta promptly ordered the creation of an expeditionary force to support their compatriots. Colonel Antonio Baraya was appointed commander of this force, while Lieutenant Girardot was placed in charge of the vanguard.

The expeditionary force, consisting of 150 troops along with 16 artillerymen and cannons, departed from Santafé for Cali in November 1810.

Baraya reached Cali, where the available forces of the Confederation gathered on December 26, and dedicated himself to preparing the campaign to capture Popayán. On March 25, 1811, the Republican army, with more than a thousand men, left Corrales for Piendamó, preceded by a vanguard under the command of the 19-year-old lieutenant, Atanasio Girardot. His instructions were to reach the Cofre River and wait there but, not finding the enemy, he continued his advance to the bridge over the Palace river, where he fortified the heights that dominated it. An Imprudent decision of the impetuous commander, who until then had never entered into combat and longed to deal with the enemy. On March 28, the Battle of Bajo Palacé occurred when a royalist force five times superior forced the passage of the bridge at 12:30 p.m., with artillery support. Girardot tenaciously defended his position, immediately informing Baraya, who was in Piendamó, two hours from where the combat was occurring, which indicates to what extent his impetuous subordinate had detached himself from the bulk of the army.

When Baraya reached the Palacé river well in the afternoon, Girardot was still holding his positions, in front of the bridge head that his adversary had achieved on the north bank. Baraya immediately attacked in support of his subordinate with his own infantry and the Vallecaucan cavalry. The clash was violent. Girardot attacked from his positions and at dusk the royalists had been defeated in was the first battle of the Colombian war of Independence.

For his actions he was promoted to captain and awarded a badge of honor with the colors red and yellow with an inscription Defensor de la Libertad en Palacé (Defender of Liberty at Palacé).

=== New Granada Civil War ===
On January 10, 1812, Baraya triumphantly entered Santafé. Since the previous September, Antonio Nariño had acceded to the presidency of Cundinamarca, with editorials from the newspaper La Bagatela that had led to the resignation of former president Jorge Tadeo Lozano. A supporter of a strong centralist government to face an uncertain future, Nariño decided to incorporate the provinces of Tunja and Socorro into the nascent state. Promoted to brigadier, Baraya marched to Tunja. Girardot, now captain, commanded the vanguard. Previously, Colonel Joaquín Ricaurte had occupied El Socorro. In a sudden change of front, the two expedition commanders switched to the federalist side of the Congress of the United Provinces of New Granada, and explained their reasons in an act, where Girardot's signature does not appear.

Baraya would have so much confidence in his young captain, that he ordered him to act against the vanguard of a centralist army, commanded by his own father and under the orders of José Miguel Pey. For Girardot, duty was put before all consideration and, in an act that must have weighed a lot on his soul, he obtained the surrender of the unit, and captured his father Don Luis.

Baraya and Ricaurte, after a first success at the Battle of Ventaquemada, advanced on Santafé, put on a war footing by Antonio Nariño. It was up to Girardot, in Baraya's plan, to take the positions on the slopes of Monserrate, which he did with his usual boldness, and launch from there his attack in the final assault on the city. Nariño managed to immobilize him in his positions, through a ruse in which he simulated an order from Baraya. Biting his impatience, the young captain had to observe the disaster of the Federal Army, and retreat to Tunja with his troops intact, while his companions fell prisoners.

The civil war ended after the centralist victory at the Battle of San Victorino, the federalists and the centralists then joined forces to face the growing royalist offensives that threatened the north and south of the country.

=== Admirable Campaign in Venezuela ===
Simón Bolívar, an exiled Venezuelan military officer who had fled to New Granada after the fall of the first republic of Venezuela to the Spanish, was commissioned into the army of the union of the federal congress and made a brigadier. Bolivar requested that the congress allow him to take neogranadine troops to invade and liberate Venezuela, as the royalists in Venezuela posed a threat to the republic and had already taken the border city of Cúcuta. The congress approved and sent troops to assist him along with centralists who also contributed some troops as well. This campaign led by Brigadier Bolívar would come to be known as the Admirable Campaign.

Colonel Atanasio was selected to be part of this force, he commanded the vanguard, made up of the 3rd, 4th and 5th Battalions of La Unión, a total of 560 neogranadine troops. Girardot's performance along the bristling combat itinerary corresponded exactly to his temperament.

Leaving San Cristóbal on May 28, 1813, Bolivar's army occupied the city of Mérida six days later. Without delay they continued their march on Trujillo, which fell into their hands on June 12. On the 14th, Bolívar arrived there with the rearguard and promulgated his infamous decree of the War to Death.

The southern flank of the invasion offered the greatest risk, because of the large number royalist troops concentrated in the area of Barinas. Bolívar decided to execute a risky setback maneuver over the provincial capital, achieving the annihilation of the column commanded by Lieutenant Colonel Martí and occupying the capital of the province. To destroy the rest of the forces of the Spanish commander Antonio Tizcar, he dispatched Colonel Girardot who, in a rapid penetrating maneuver, reached the town of Nutrias, where the Spanish had placed their headquarters, and caught them by surprise: the ensuing battle saw the annihilation of the Spanish forces there, with only Tizcar and his entourage being able to escape the disaster.

Bolívar's final advance towards Caracas on the San Carlos-Valencia road, left Girardot as a rearguard, in the Apure region. The neogranadine officer countermarched quickly, reaching the bulk of the Army on July 29 in San Carlos. This was how he was able to take part in the Battle of Taguanes, commanded by the Liberator. In his report to the Congress of New Granada, Bolívar highlighted in the first place, Girardot's intrepidity and heroism during the battle.

Bolivar and his army then entered Caracas shortly after, establishing the Second Republic of Venezuela. However royalist uprisings in various parts of Venezuela, along with the arrival of important Spanish reinforcements received by sea from their colonies of Puerto Rico and Cuba coupled with the losses and exhaustion of the republican troops, allowed Captain General Juan Domingo de Monteverde, commander of Spanish forces in Venezuela, to lead a counteroffensive. With 1,800 men he departed the fortified redoubt of Puerto Cabello and, heading south, occupied the double position of Las Trincheras and the hill of Bárbula, somewhat separated from each other, which allowed them to be beat in detail.

=== Battle of Barbula ===
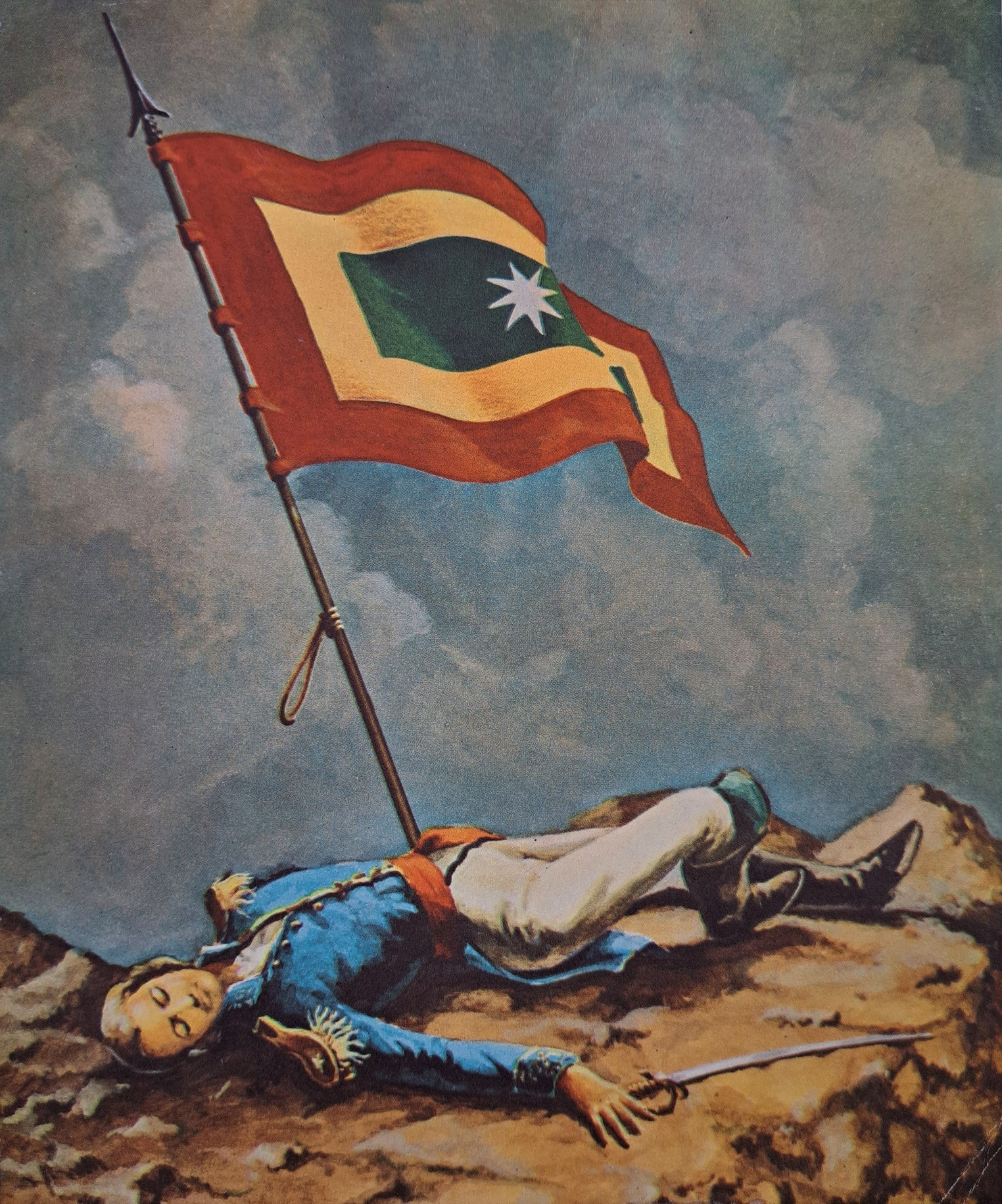
Death of Atanasio Girardot next to the flag of New Granada on September 30, 1813

On September 30, 1813 it dawned clear, without a cloud. Since the night before Bolívar had arranged the attack on the Bárbula with a triple column, under the command of Girardot, D'Elhuyar and Urdaneta. With his usual intrepidity Girardot attacked. A few steps away he was accompanied by Urdaneta, whose Memories testify to the action. The neogranadine colonel, accustomed to leading at the head of his men, took the flag of his battalion, the 4th battalion of the union, and led the assault on the hill. The attack forced the royalist commander to abandon his solid positions, to which Girardot said to Urdaneta: “Look there comrade, at how those cowards flee!” At that moment a royalist bullet pierced his heart.

== Legacy ==
For Bolívar, the loss of Girardot was both a profound emotional blow and an irreplaceable loss to his campaign. Girardot had consistently been entrusted with perilous operations. He was one of Bolívar's officers.

Upon learning of Girardot's death, Bolívar issued a lengthy decree of honors on September 30, 1813. An excerpt from the decree reads:

“Colonel Atanasio Girardot has died on this day in the field of honor. The Republics of New Granada and Venezuela owe him, in large part, the glory that adorns their arms and the freedom of their soil.”

The decree goes on to enumerate the many victories Girardot had commanded and expresses the gratitude that the people of both New Granada and Venezuela should feel toward this fallen hero. It also emphasizes his place in history as one of the great champions of liberty. Bolívar's decree instructs that a month-long period of mourning be observed throughout the country and that Girardot's remains be repatriated to his birthplace in Antioquía. His heart, however, was to be transported in triumph to Caracas, where a solemn ceremony would be held, and it would be interred in a mausoleum at the main cathedral of the city.

The decree further stipulates that Girardot's battalion, the 4th Battalion of the Union, be renamed the Girardot Battalion and that his family in New Granada be awarded a lifelong pension as a mark of the nation's gratitude.

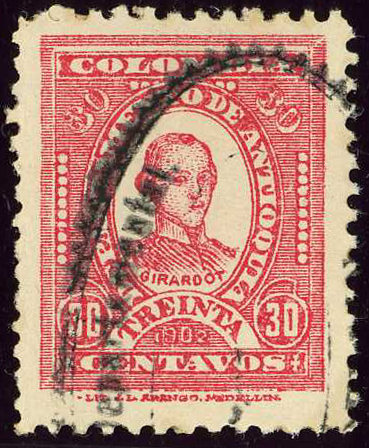
Portrait on a Department of Antioquia stamp of 1902

Various places have been named in tribute to him:

- Girardot, Cundinamarca, Colombia
- Girardot Municipality, Aragua, Venezuela
- Atanasio Girardot Sports Complex in Medellin
