= Revolt of July 20, 1810 =

Revolt that started Colombian independence

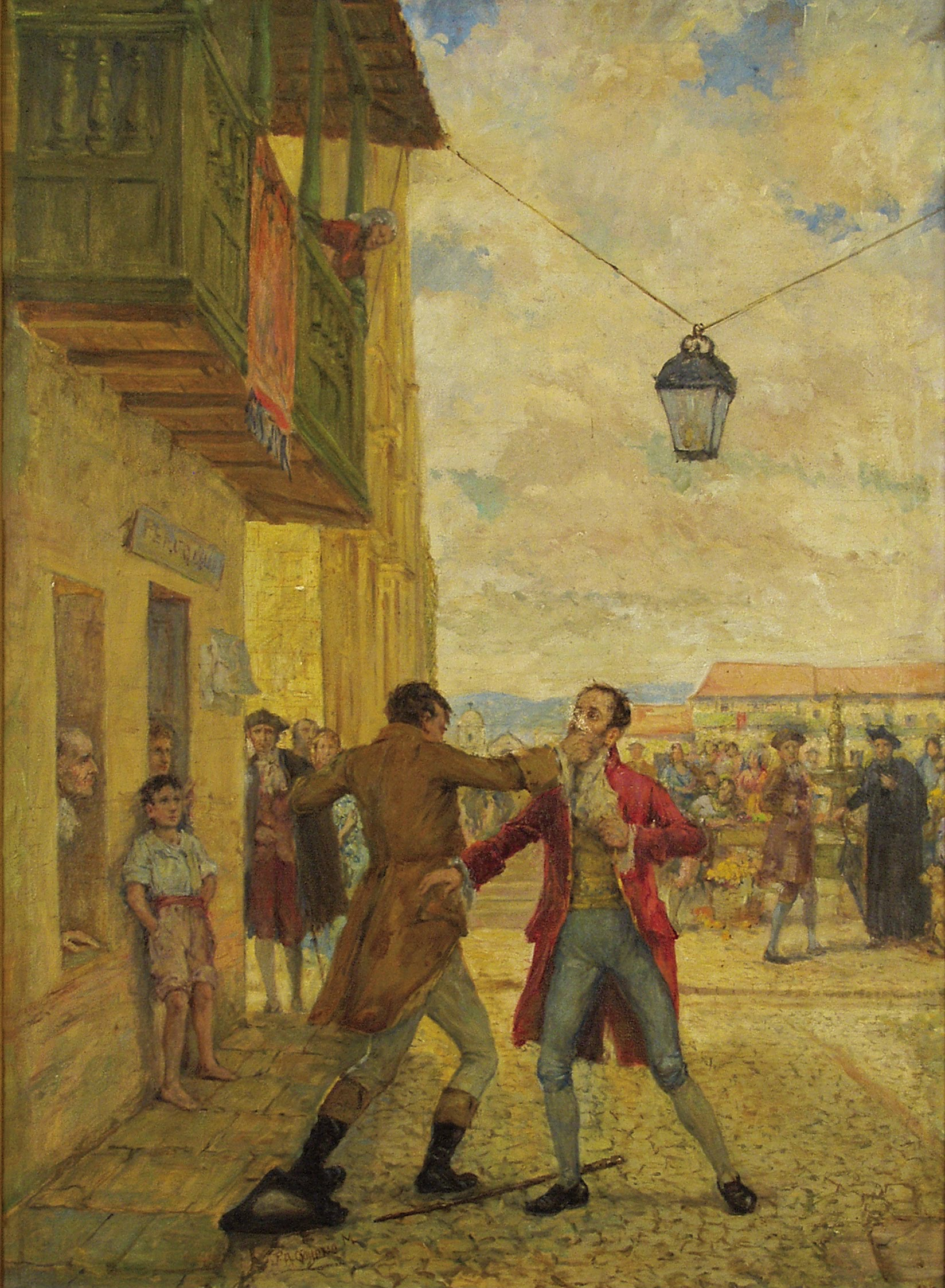
Painting by Pedro Alcántara Quijano depicting Antonio Morales assaulting Gonzalo Llorente on July 20, 1810

The Revolt of July 20, 1810 was a revolution initiated by the criollos in the capital of the Viceroyalty of New Granada against the Spanish Empire that gave way to the Independence of what is known today as the Republic of Colombia.

The revolt began with an altercation that occurred in Santafé, present-day Bogotá, capital of the Viceroyalty of New Granada. The event, also known as the "El Florero de Llorente" or the "Reyerta of July 20," led to the establishment of the first junta in Santafé and led to the eventual removal of Viceroy Antonio Amar y Borbón and the other royal authorities who had tried to prevent the establishment of the junta. The revolt coupled with other revolts throughout New Granada would lead to the start of the Colombian War of Independence, which would last longer than a decade.

As a result, July 20th is commemorated as Colombia's Independence Day. While the goal of conspirators was not to declare independence from Spain, but instead to gain more autonomy within the Spanish Empire, the removal of Viceroy and the royal authorities from power would eventually move the leaders to eventually begin a movement towards full declaration of independence from Spain by 1813.

== Prelude ==
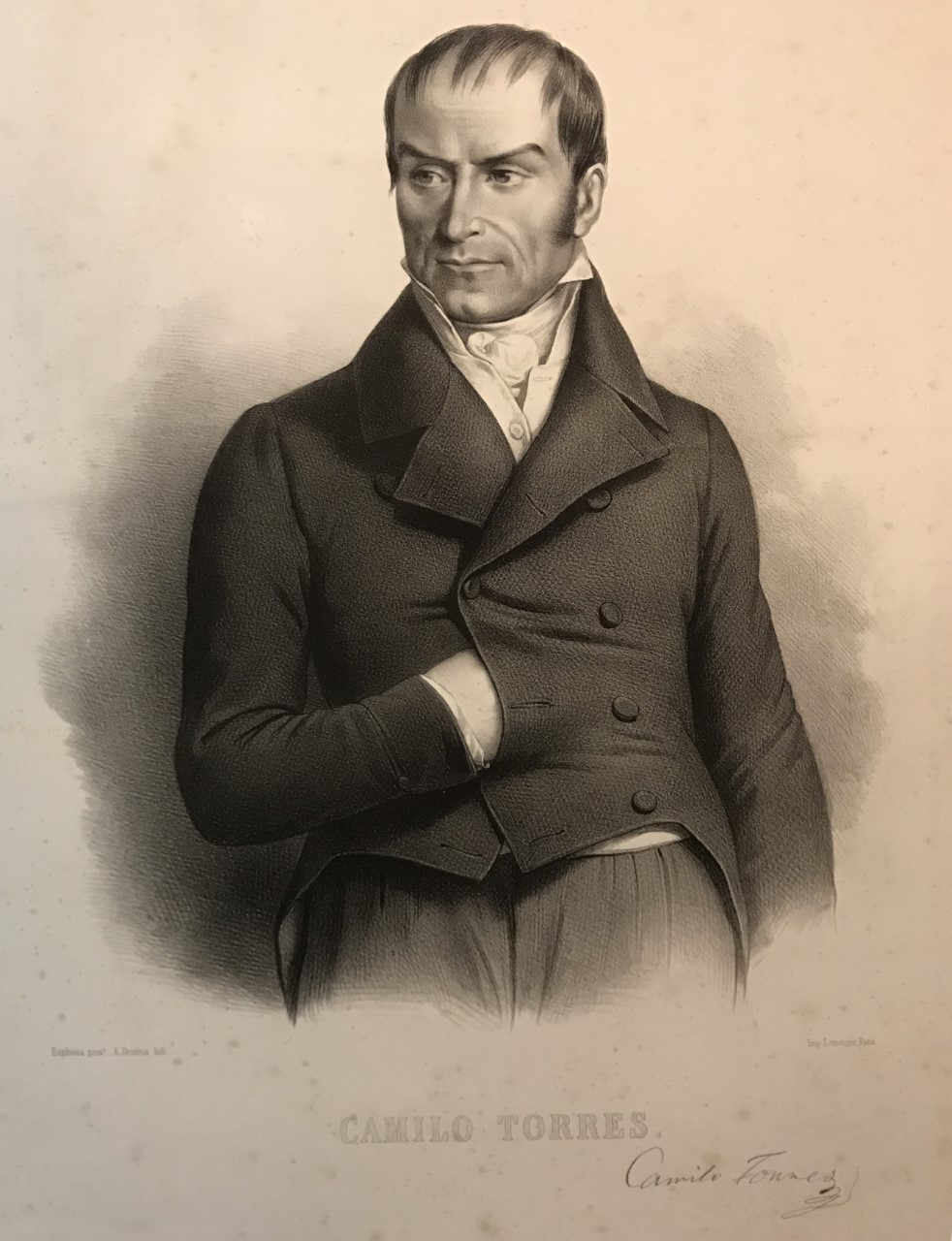
Camilo Torres Tenorio

One of these prominent creoles was Camilo Torres Tenorio who pushed for the establishment of a junta and would publish in 1809 as memorandum known as the Memorandum of Offences . In this publication Torres defended the right of the Viceroyalty of New Granada to establish a junta given the political circumstances. Although the draft expressed many of common sentiments of Criollos at the time and probably was discussed by prominent members of the capital's society, it was never adopted by the cabildo. It would be published for the first time only in 1832. Other publications such as the Suba Letters also expressed these ideas and were distributed clandestinely.

The situation began to grow so serious that Viceroy Amar y Borbón convened a meeting in the Viceroy's palace with the members of the Royal Audiencia to inform them about the secret notices that were coming to him where he was informed of the possibility that a revolutionary force against the Spanish system would explode in the immediate future. Unconcernedly, one of the members of the Royal Audiencia, Hernández de Alba, made his voice heard to say: "Americans are toothless dogs: they bark but they do not bite."

On 9 July, In the provincial capital of Socorro the inhabitants of the town rose up against the Corregidor José Váldes de Posada with goal of "Restoring to the people of Socorro the sacred and imprescriptible rights of man", this revolt was suppressed by the local Spanish garrison leading to the death of 8 people.

== Revolt ==
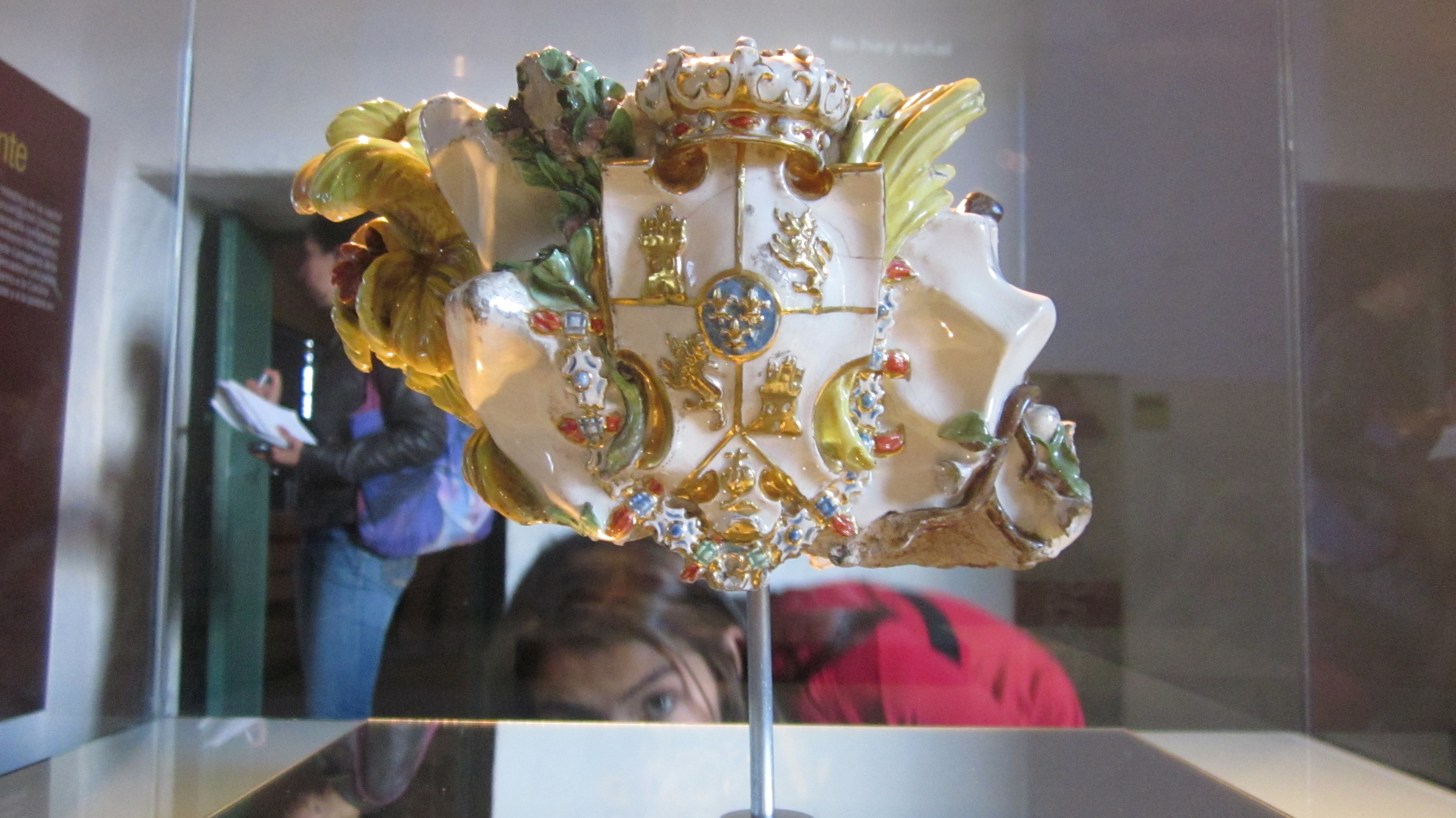
Flower vase that was used as the pretext to start the revolt. Now housed in the Independence Museum in Bogotá

When Llorente refused Rubio's request (as they had hoped) and reportedly gave them an insulting response, it was at this moment that the other conspirators such as the brothers Antonio and Francisco, as well as their father, Francisco Morales, became involved and got into a heated argument with the Spaniard. A crowd began to gather around the store when the situation exploded when Antonio Morales assaulted Llorente, causing a popular tumult of great proportions because it was a market day. Llorente fled and took refuge in the Morenos' house, located on Calle Real, and then returned camouflaged to his home, but three hours later the fury of the crowd demanded that he be taken to jail for the inferred grievance, at this point the Mayor of Santa Fe, Jose Miguel Pey, attempted to calm the crowd, Pey had entered Llorente's store along with Camilo Torres and Lorenzo Marroquín where the commotion was occurring.
