= Bárbula Tunnel =

Bárbula Tunnel (Spanish: Túnel de Bárbula) is a partly-constructed railway tunnel in Venezuela. It is between Las Trincheras and Naguanagua in Carabobo state. The tunnel has a length of 7.8 km (4.8 mi), which makes it the longest in South America.

The tunnel is part of a projected line between the sea port city of Puerto Cabello, Carabobo State, and the crossroads town of La Encrucijada, Aragua State. Tunnels are required to provide a low gradient route through the mountains of the Venezuelan Coastal Range. Bárbula Tunnel takes its name from Bárbula, a locality near Naguanagua.

== Geology ==
Granitic rocks are typical of the geology of the area, but clay and alluvium, requiring special ground improvement, have been described as being characteristic of the tunnel.

== History of the project ==
In the 19th century the Puerto Cabello and Valencia Railway was built along a similar route between Valencia and the coast. By following a river, the engineers were able to keep the tunnels on this line short, but they felt obliged to use a rack section to deal with the difficult gradients near Bárbula. The railway closed after World War II and traffic moved to road.

Interest in railways revived in the country in the late 20th century. A Metro was constructed in Caracas and work was done on a commuter line between Caracas (Libertador Simón Bolívar Terminal) and Cúa

=== Financial problems ===
Completion of the line was scheduled for 2010. In 2016 a report relating to the Italian-based construction firm Salini Impregilo described work on the project as "irregular and marked by slow payments by the client as a result of the country’s poor economic conditions, mainly related to the drop in the price of oil."
