= Camoruco railway station =

Railroad station in Valencia, Venezuela

Coordinates: 10.2004849°N 68.0100513°W

Camoruco station Antigua Estación Camoruco del Ferrocarril
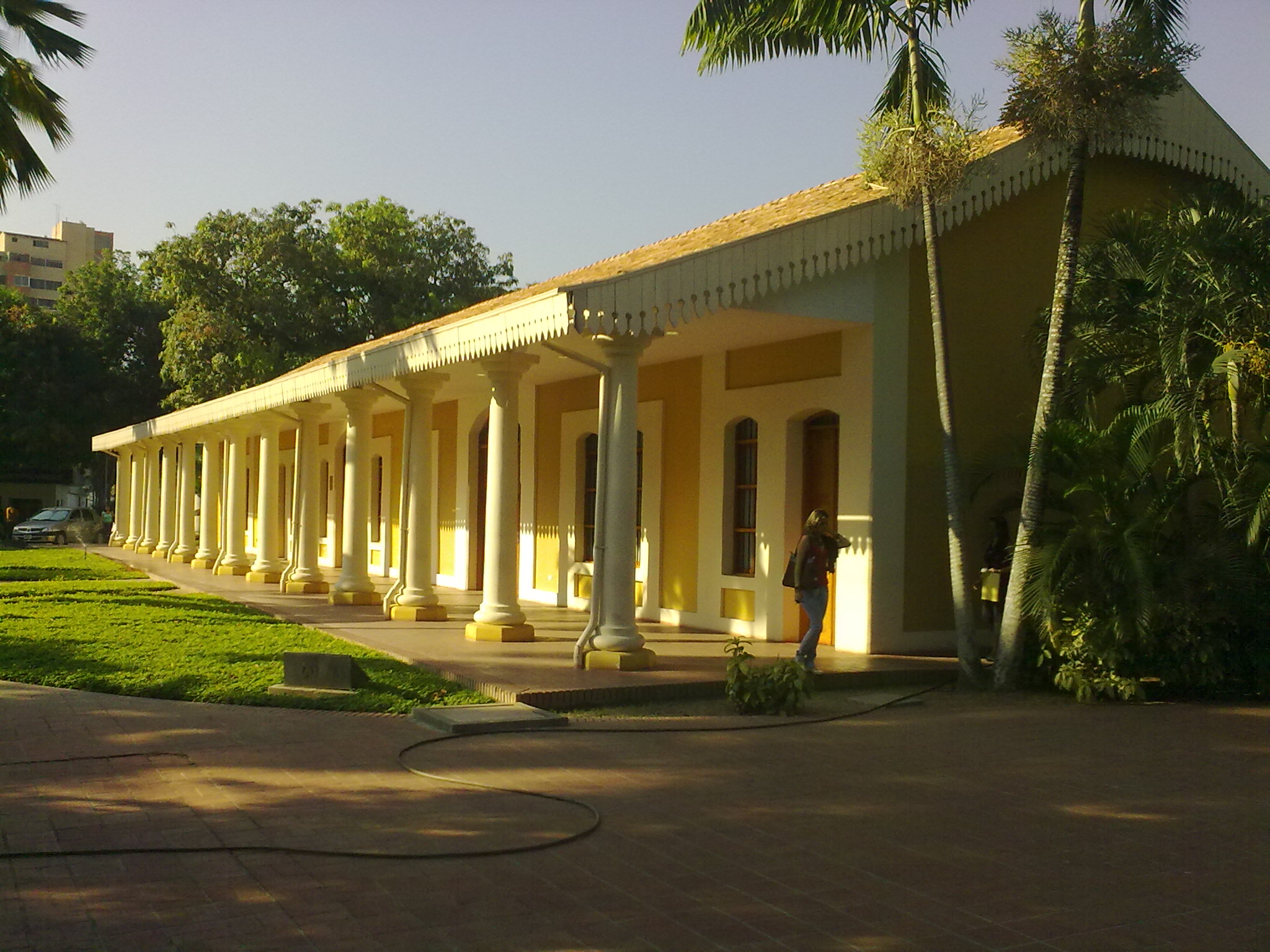
- The former station is now part of the University of Carabobo.

General information
- Location: Valencia, Venezuela
- System: Former terminus of the Puerto Cabello and Valencia railway
- Owner: (currently) University of Carabobo

Construction
- Structure type: Limited use of cast iron

History
- Opened: 1888
- Closed: 1959
Location

The Camoruco railway terminus (Spanish: Estación Camoruco del Ferrocarril) in Valencia, Venezuela, is a rare survival of a 19th-century railway station in the South America country. The building is also known as the Rectorado of the University of Carabobo. When the Puerto Cabello and Valencia railway closed in the 1950s, the station was transferred to the University of Carabobo which converted it for administrative use.

== Location ==
Camoruco is a suburb of Valencia 3 km from the city centre. While the railway line was in operation, there was a tram service from the station to the Plaza Bolivar in the centre. Initially the trams were horse-drawn, but were powered by electricity from some point in the 20th century.

== Architecture ==
The building respects Spanish Colonial tradition, although the structure was advanced for its time in making use of cast iron imported from England, Traditional materials were also used.

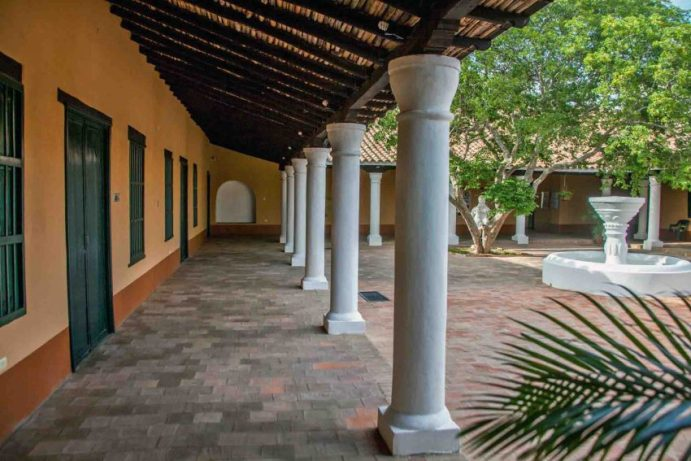
Colonial architecture, as in this courtyard at Coro, presents a parallel with the railway station.

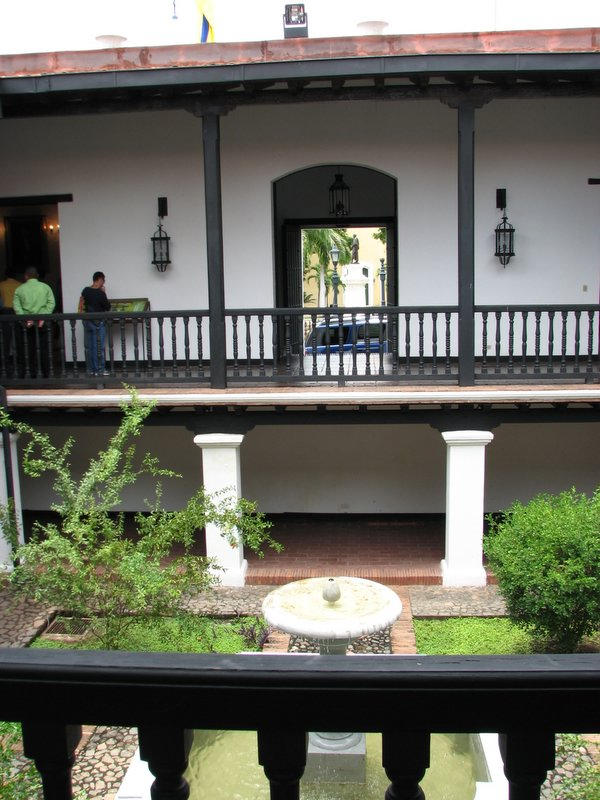
The Casa del Congreso de Angostura, an 18th-century building in Ciudad Bolívar

== History ==
Guzman Blanco, the president of Venezuela, gave a concession to a British company to build a railway between Valencia and the Caribbean coast at Puerto Cabello. The 55 km route of the Puerto Cabello and Valencia railway crossed a range of mountains. The railway was inaugurated in 1888. The railway was known locally as the English railway. This distinguished it from the other railway in Valencia, the Great Venezuela Railway, a slightly later German-built line. (Note: Both lines used the same gauge and they were eventually connected at Valencia.) However, the Puerto Cabello Valencia line was not the only British-built railway in the country, and the La Guaira and Caracas Railway was also known as the English railway.

The right to construct and to operate the railway was to be an exclusive one for ninety-nine years from the date of its completion. However, rail transport in Venezuela became neglected. It went into a major decline from the 1950s, with road transport taking its place.

== Revival of rail ==
In the 21st century a metro system opened in Valencia as a north-south route passing near the old terminus. One of the stations is called Francisco de Miranda (Rectorado). The metro system is planned to connect to a new railway line to the coast at an interchange in Naguanagua Municipality.
