= Plaza Bolívar (Valencia) =

Square in Valencia, Venezuela

Bolivar Monument
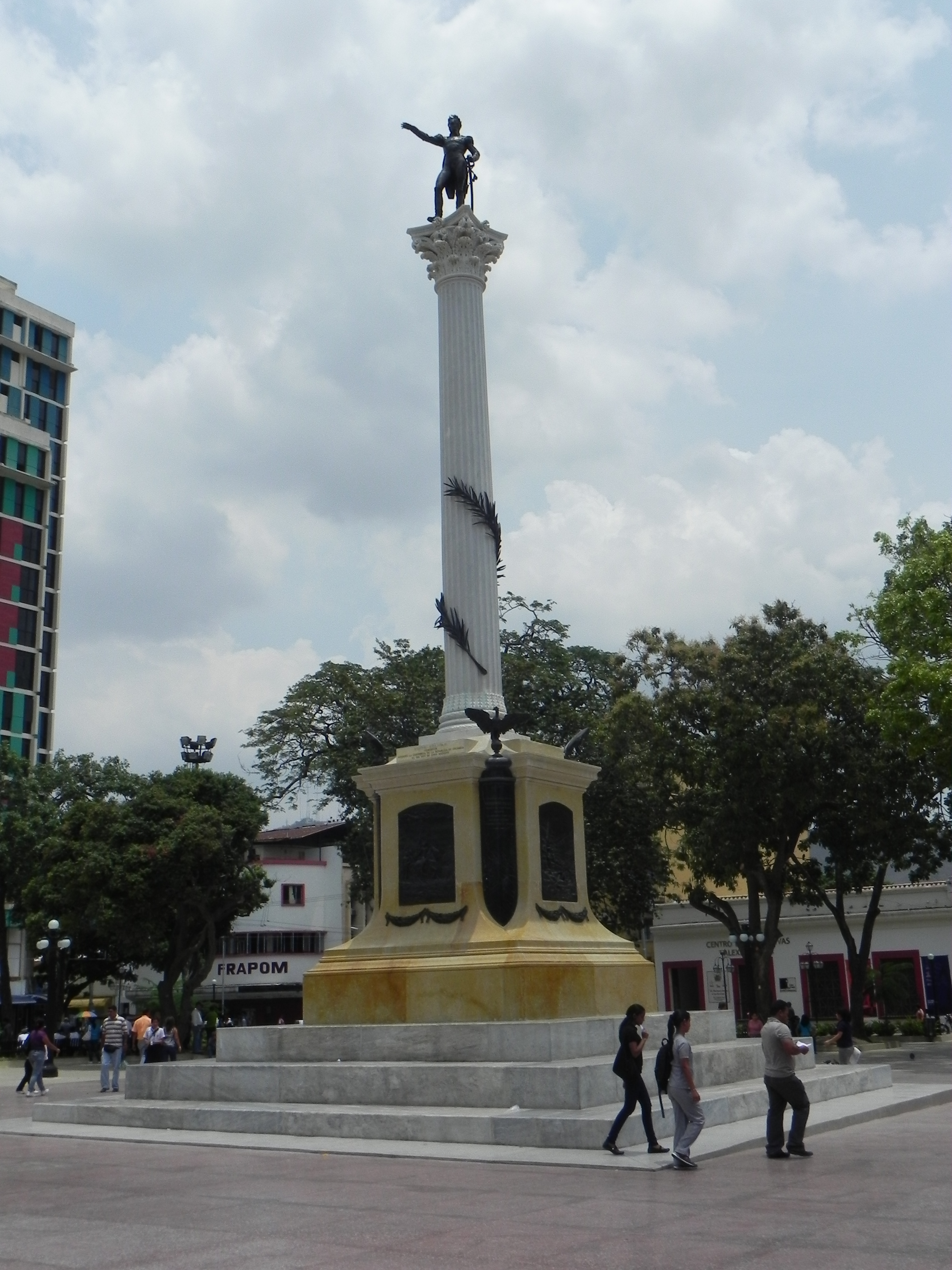
- Type: Victory column
- Material: Marble and bronze
- Opening date: 24 June 1889
- Dedicated to: Simón Bolívar

The Plaza Bolívar is a square in Valencia, Venezuela. It occupies a central site, and is used for public meetings. Its origin was in the colonial period, when the city was laid out on a grid plan (see note^{1}). Some buildings in the vicinity, such as the Cathedral date from the colonial period.

The square was renamed after Simón Bolívar in the 19th century as a consequence of Venezuela's independence. The centrepiece of the square is a monumental column. Inaugurated in 1889, the column commemorates Bolívar and specifically his victory at the battle of Carabobo in 1821.

== History ==
In the 1880s, when Valencia's monument to Bolivar was constructed, Venezuela was an agricultural country. Despite having large amounts of iron ore, the country lacked industrial iron-making capacity. Antonio Guzmán Blanco, three times president of Venezuela, implemented plans to modernize infrastructure. His projects, which have been described as megalomaniac, had a strong impact on Valencia, the second city of the Republic. He gave a concession to a British company to build a railway between Valencia and the coast at Puerto Cabello. The Valencia terminus was at Camoruco, 3 km from the city center, and plans were made for a tramway (initially horse-drawn) to the Plaza Bolívar. Guzman Blanco also approved a railway from Valencia to Caracas, the Great Venezuela Railway, built by a German company. The Valencia terminus was at San Blas, relatively near the city center.

In 1887 the president decided to enhance the Plaza Bolívar of Valencia. The main feature is a marble column (called a monolito in Spanish) surmounted by a bronze statue of Bolívar. The monument was part of a national programme of promoting the memory of Bolívar begun in the 1870s, when, for example, Guzmán Blanco commissioned an equestrian statue for the Plaza Bolivar of Caracas and adopted the bolívar as the currency of Venezuela.

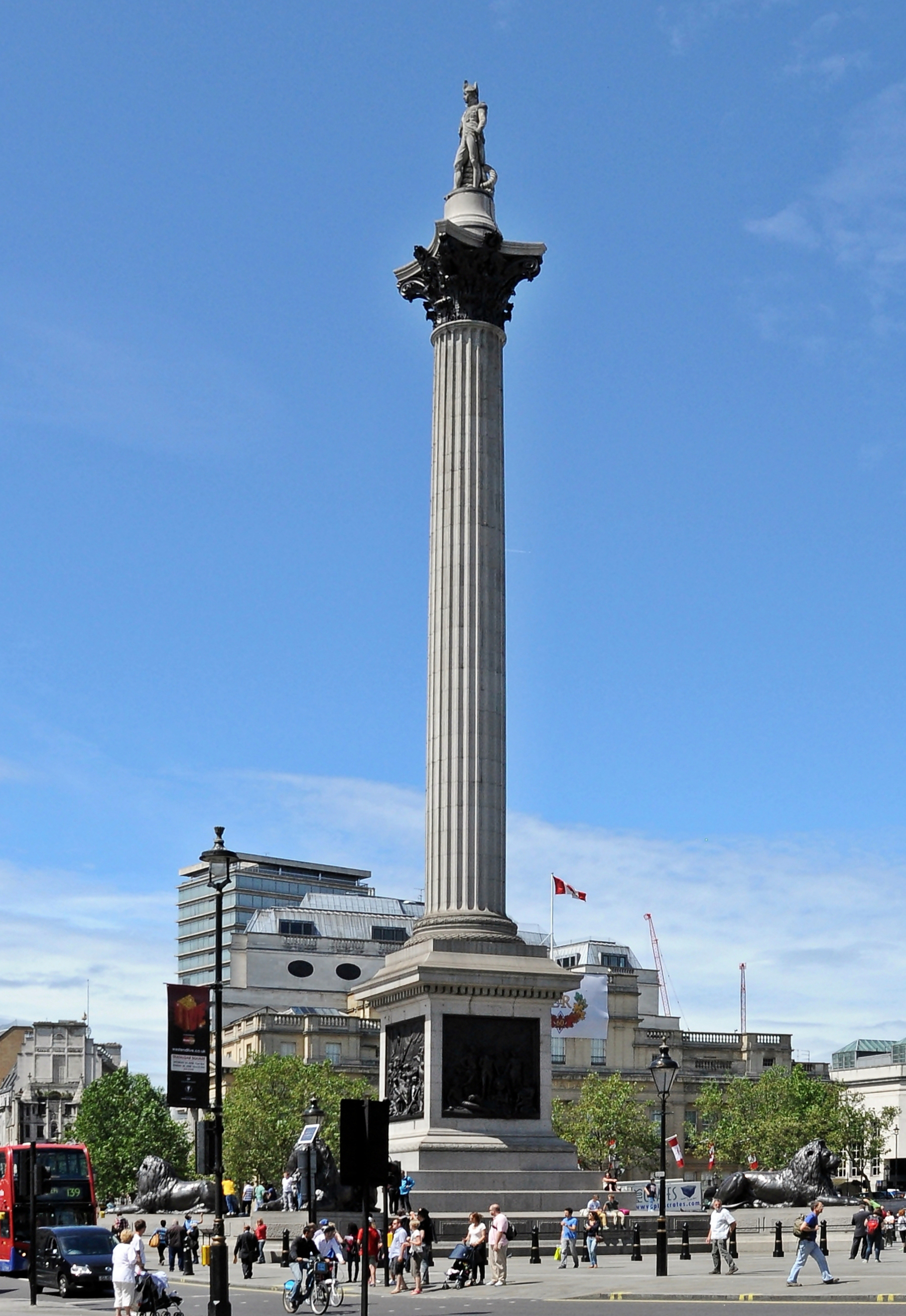
Nelson's Column presents some similarities.

Work on the column was endorsed by General Hermógenes López, governor of Carabobo State, who succeeded Guzmán Blanco as president of Venezuela during a transition period in 1887/1888. It was inaugurated under a third president, Juan Pablo Rojas Paúl on Carabobo Day 1889.

== Design ==
The project was under the direction of the architect Antonio Malaussena (1853–1919). Malaussena later designed Valencia's municipal theatre (inaugurated in 1894) in Napoleon III style. The sculptor Rafael de la Cova, who studied in Europe in the 1870s, is credited with bas-reliefs depicting the battle of Carabobo at the base of the monument.

=== Imagery ===
The statue depicts Bolivar pointing south-west towards the battlefield of Carabobo, his famous victory of 1821 in the Venezuelan War of Independence.

The pedestal of the monument is adorned with the shield of the State of Carabobo and three bas-reliefs depicting scenes from the battle:

- Bolívar directing his troops.
- the British Legion (volunteer troops who fought under Bolivar).

At the corners of the pedestal are Andean condors.

== Conservation ==
The monument is officially protected, but in 2018 El Carabobeño reported that ornamental metal-work had been removed from the structure.

== Notes ==
1. In 1573, King Philip II of Spain compiled the Laws of the Indies to guide the construction and administration of colonial communities. The Laws specified a square or rectangular central plaza with eight principal streets running from the plaza's corners. Hundreds of grid-plan communities throughout the Americas were established according to this pattern, echoing the practices of earlier Indian civilizations.
