= Miranda station =

Miranda station or Francisco de Miranda station may refer to:

- Miranda station (Caracas), a rapid transit station in Caracas, Venezuela
- Miranda station (Valencia), a rapid transit station in Valencia, Venezuela

Miranda station may also refer to:

- Miranda railway station, a commuter rail station in the Sutherland Shire, New South Wales Australia
