= John Blackett (engineer) =

New Zealand engineer (1818–1893)

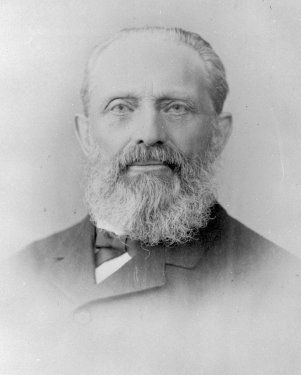
Blackett in 1891

John Blackett (8 October 1818 – 8 January 1893) was a New Zealand engineer.

Blackett was born and educated in Newcastle upon Tyne. The son of a coal agent, he was a pupil with Messrs. R and W Hawthorn, engineers, 1834–41; draughtsman and office engineer to the Great Western Steamship Company, 1841–44; head engineer in iron shipbuilding and railway work with T. R. Guppy, A.I.C.E., 1844–46; engineer to the Governor and Company of Copper Mines in England at Cwm Avon, South Wales, 1846–48. From 1848 to 1851 he practised privately as an engineer in England.

In 1851 he emigrated to New Zealand, initially to New Plymouth. In 1859 he was appointed Provincial Engineer at Nelson. From April to June 1867, Blackett was appointed onto the Executive of the Nelson Provincial Council. There were attempts to persuade Blackett to stand for election as Superintendent, but he did not consent.

Under Sir Julius Vogel's great Public Works policy he was responsible for road construction throughout the colony from 1870 to 1878; under John Carruthers the Engineer-in-Chief of the Public Works Department who was responsible for railway construction. Blackett also became the Marine Engineer in 1871.

In 1878 he was made Engineer-in-charge of the North Island, and in 1884 Engineer-in-chief of the colony. Blackett then became Consulting Engineer of the Government of New Zealand in London. He was responsible for the location, design and construction of 14 lighthouses around the New Zealand coastline.

Blackett died in Wellington in 1893, and was buried at Karori Cemetery.

The John Blackett Prize was established under the will of his artist daughter, Isabel Mary Houston, and is awarded to outstanding engineering students at the University of Canterbury.
