= Unellez Botanical Garden =

- Jardín Botánico de la Unellez
- Interactive map of Unellez Botanical Garden
- Type: Botanical garden
- Location: Barinas, Venezuela
- Coordinates: 8°38′07″N 70°14′57″W
- Area: 14 hectares (35 acres)
- Opened: 1979
- Operator: Fundación Jardín Botánico Unellez
- Website: jardinbotanico.unellez.edu.ve

The Unellez Botanical Garden (Spanish: Jardín Botánico de la Unellez) Is a botanical garden and a zoo of 14 ha of extension, located inside the facilities of the Universidad Nacional Experimental de los Llanos Occidentales Ezequiel Zamora in Barinas, Venezuela. It is a member of the BGCI, being its international identification code as a botanical institution as well as s It is located to the northwest of the city of Barinas, at the foot of the Mountain range of the $ andes; To a height of 200 msnm and presenting an average annual temperature of 28 °C.

It was created in 1979, This garden also includes a zoo with an area of 14 hectares of which 4 ha correspond to a lagoon

The collections of plants of the botanical garden, are grouped like:

- Arboretum (34 spp.)
- Plants of economic interest (50 spp.)
- Plants of medicinal interest
- Fodder plants
- Palmetum (13 spp.)
- Ornamental plants (100 spp.)
- There is a germplasm bank with a mean conservation capacity that contains 84 accessions, representing 73 species (1994 figures).

== See also ==
- Naguanagua Botanical Garden
- Caracas Botanical Garden
