= Santa Rosa station =

Santa Rosa station may refer to the following stations:

- Santa Rosa (Barcelona Metro), a metro station in Barcelona, Spain
- Santa Rosa metro station (Lima), a metro station in Lima, Peru
- Santa Rosa station (PNR), a railway station in Santa Rosa, Laguna, the Philippines
- Santa Rosa metro station (Santiago), a metro station in Santiago, Chile
- Santa Rosa station (Carabobo), on the Valencia Metro in Carabobo, Venezuela
- Santa Rosa Downtown station, a railway station in Santa Rosa, California, United States
- Santa Rosa North station, a railway station in Santa Rosa, California, United States
