= University of Carabobo =

Public university in Valencia, Venezuela

Coordinates: 10°16′24″N 68°00′11″W

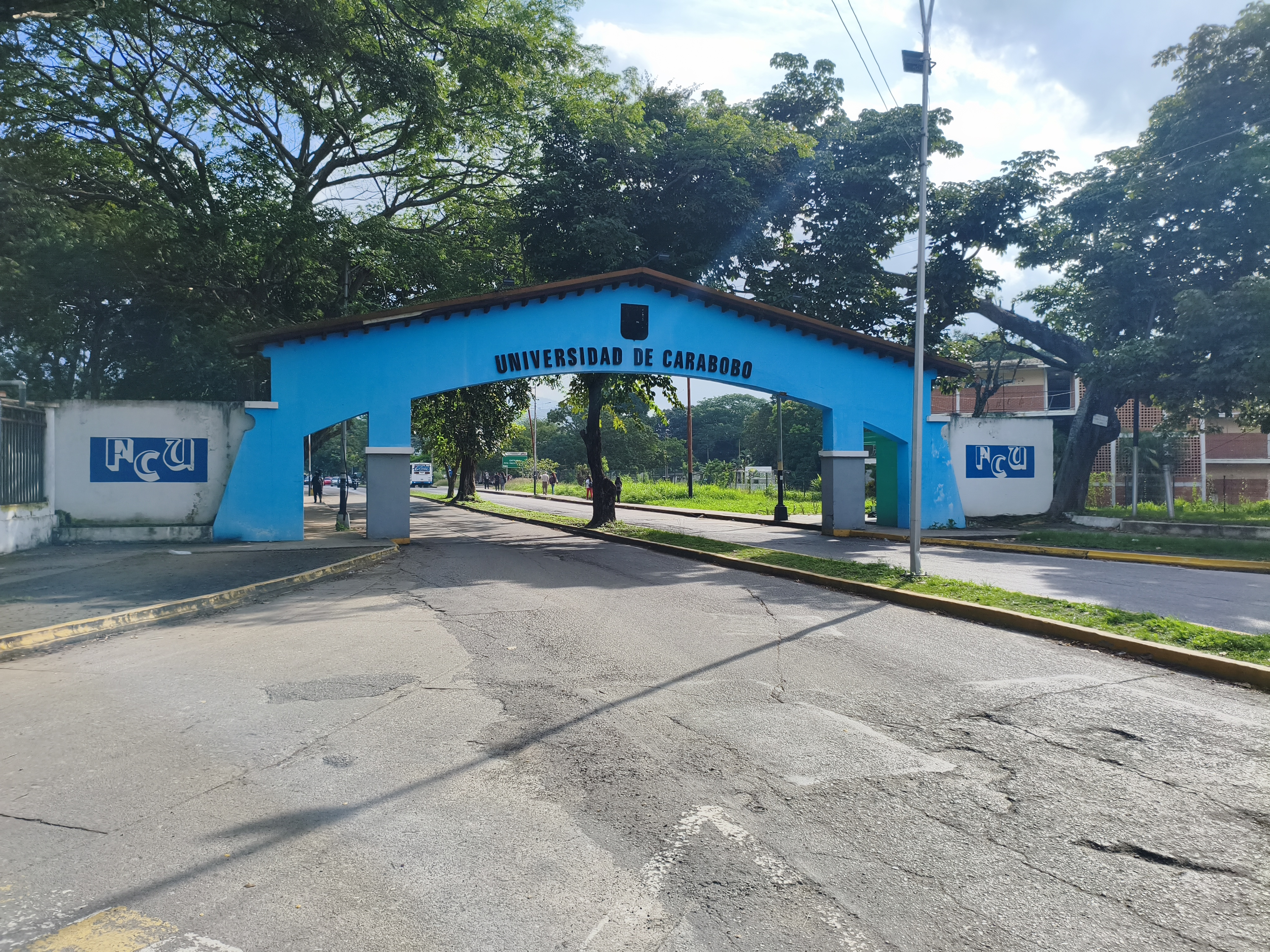
- Bárbula Arc, entrance to the University.
- Motto: Luz de una tierra inmortal (Light of an immortal land)
- Type: Public
- Established: November 15, 1892
- Rector: Jessy Divo
- Students: 65000 approx.
- Location: Naguanagua, Valencia, Carabobo, Venezuela
- Website: www.uc.edu.ve
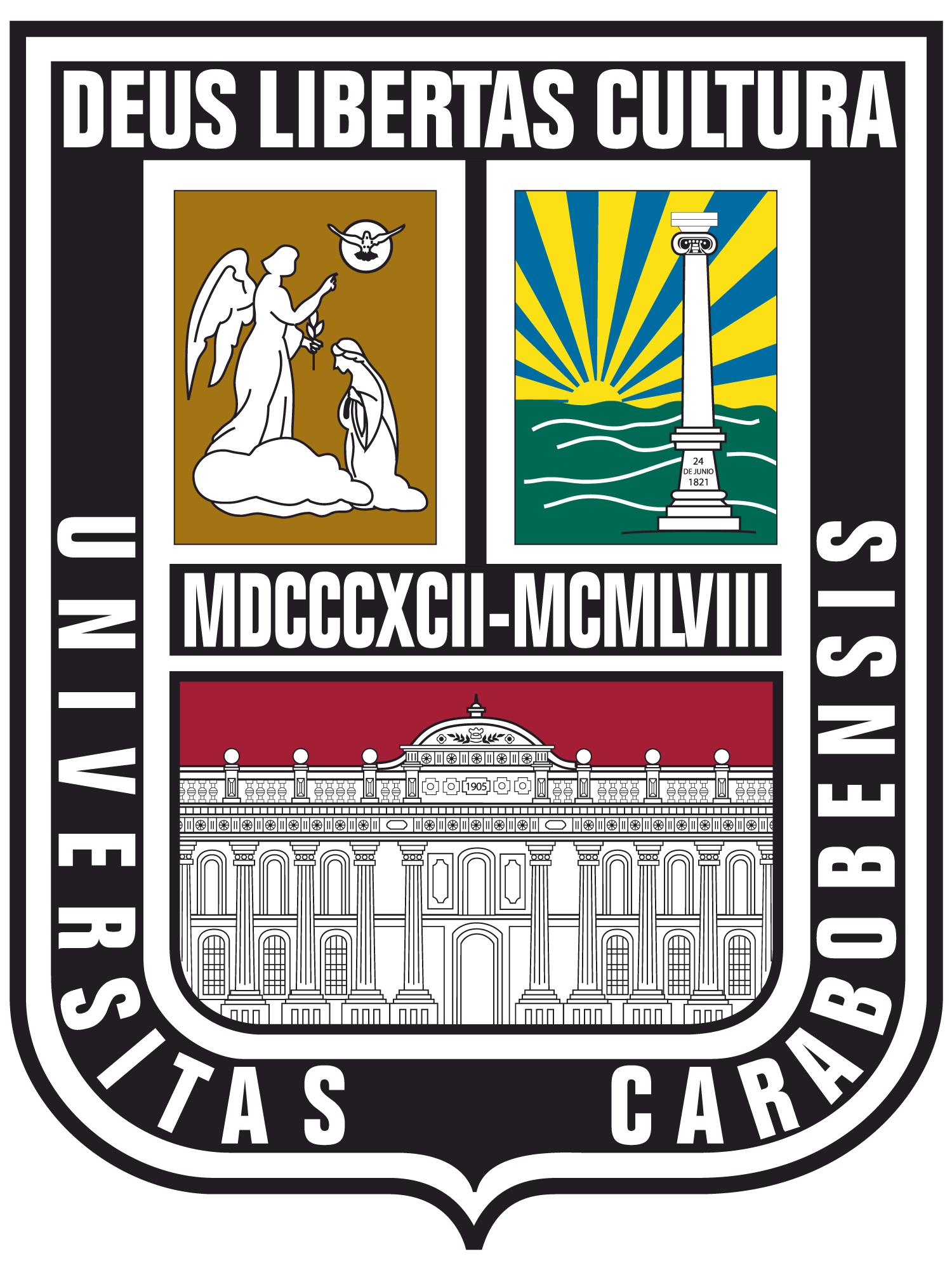

The University of Carabobo (Spanish: Universidad de Carabobo) is an autonomous, public university of Venezuela located in Valencia, Venezuela. It offers graduate and postgraduate studies in different areas. The university offers a lot of green spaces for student recreation, as well architectural art around the faculties, a theater, and two dining halls. There are around 65,000 students, mostly coming from the central part of the country.

The main campus is at Bárbula, north of Valencia in the municipality of Naguanagua. The University of Carabobo also has a centre in La Morita, Maracay, Aragua State.

== History ==
The University was reopened in 1958 after the coup d'état which ended the Perez Jimenez dictatorship. It acquired the former railway station at Camoruco, some 3 km from the city center, which had become redundant with the closure of the rail service to Puerto Cabello. The converted railway station continues to be the seat of the "Rectorado" of the University.

== Faculties ==
- College of Law and Political Sciences (FCJP)
- College of Health Sciences (FCS)
- College of Engineering
- College of Economic and Social Sciences (FACES)
- College of Education Sciences (FACE)
- College of Dentistry
- College of Sciences and Technology (FACYT)

== Notable alumni ==
- L. Rafael Reif

== See also ==
- Camoruco railway station
- Category:Universidad de Carabobo players
- Category:University of Carabobo alumni
