= List of Valencia metro stations =

List of Valencia metro stations may refer to:

- List of Valencia, Spain metro stations
- List of Valencia, Venezuela metro stations
