= Rafael de la Cova =

Venezuelan sculptor

Rafael de la Cova (c. 1850 – c. 4 May 1896) was a Venezuelan sculptor active in the second half of the 19th century.

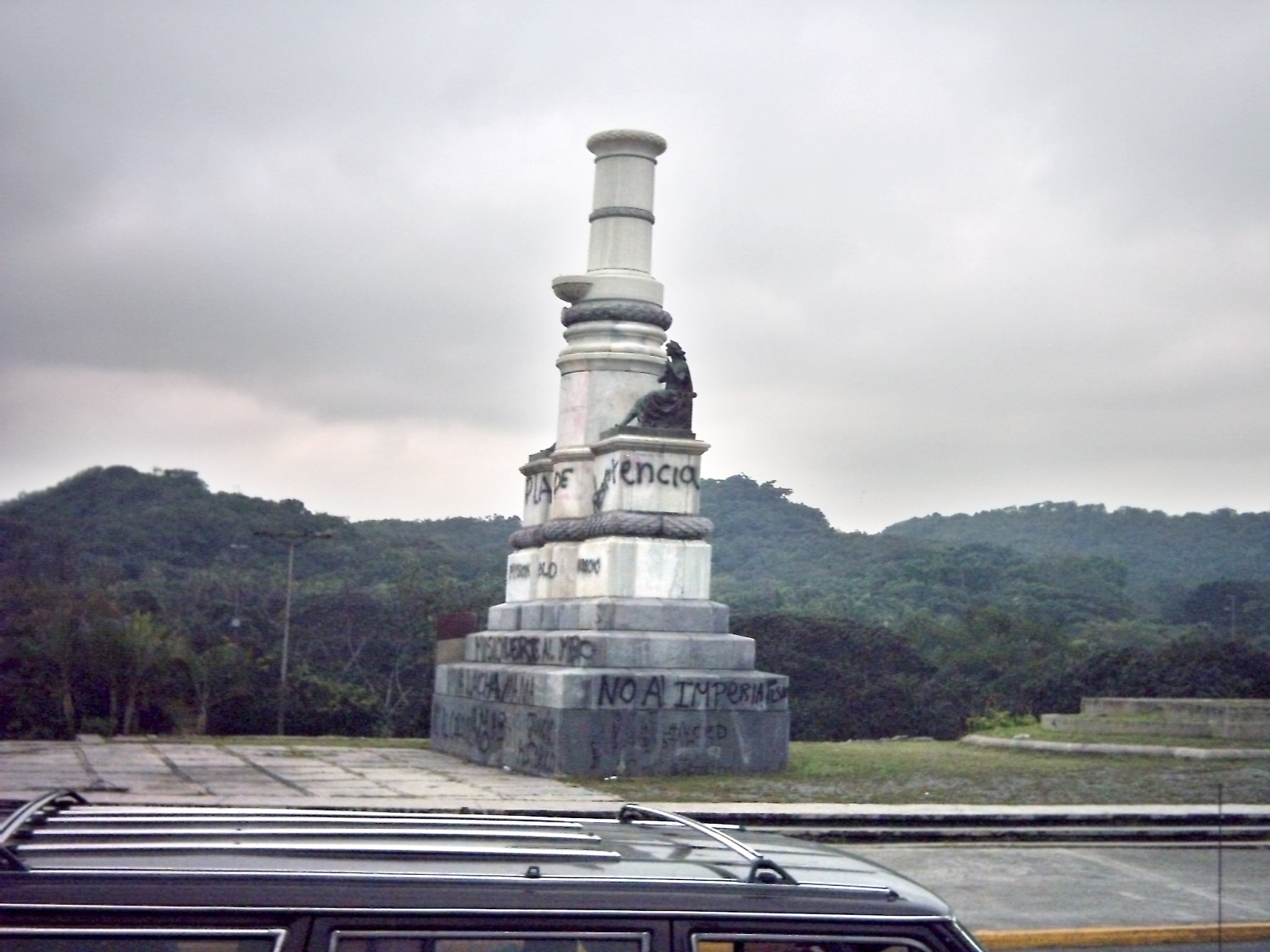
The remains of the vandalized monument to Columbus in 2006. A statue of Guaicaipuro has since been erected on the central plinth.

De la Cova received some important commissions, but a number have not survived to the present day. Perhaps his best known work is a monument to Christopher Columbus which was commissioned to commemorate the explorer's arrival in what is now Venezuela. Its title, Monumento a Colón en el Golfo Triste, refers to the Gulf of Paria where he reached the mainland of South America in 1498. The work is now largely destroyed having fallen victim to changing attitudes to the legacy of Columbus. It stood in Caracas for a hundred years before its central statue was torn down from its plinth in 2004 on Columbus Day, which had been renamed in Venezuela as the Day of Indigenous Resistance.

== Career ==
De la Cova was awarded a government scholarship in 1875 which he used to study in Rome. On his return to Venezuela he received a number of commissions including:

- Caracas. Sculptures in the Teatro Municipal (inaugurated 1881).
- Valencia. Bas-reliefs in the Plaza Bolivar depicting the Battle of Carabobo (inaugurated 1889).

== Statue in London ==
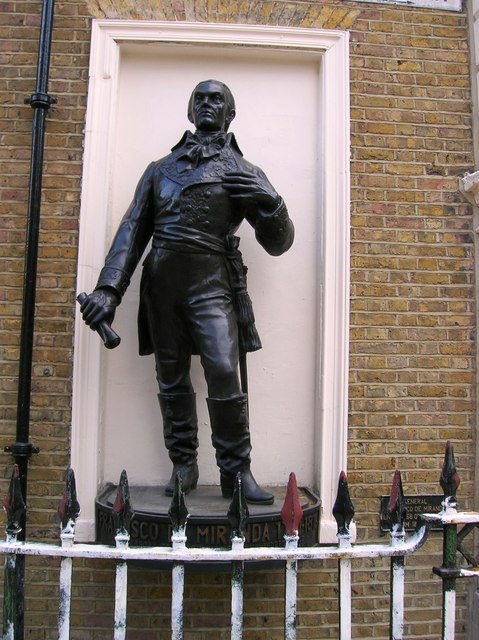

A copy of his statue of the Venezuelan revolutionary Francisco de Miranda was erected in Fitzroy Square, London, in 1990.
