= Puerto Cabello and Valencia Railway =

Defunct railway in Venezuela

The Puerto Cabello and Valencia railway is a defunct railway in Venezuela. The 55-kilometre (34 mi) railway was constructed in the 1880s to link Valencia, then the country's second city, with the Caribbean port of Puerto Cabello. It closed in the 1950s.

== Planning the railway ==
Antonio Guzmán Blanco, who was president of Venezuela for three separate terms, negotiated concessions with British entrepreneurs to build railways between the country's two main cities and their ports. The La Guaira and Caracas Railway was the first of the two lines to be completed, opening in 1883.

The route chosen by the Puerto Cabello and Valencia Railway Company involved a short coastal stretch from Puerto Cabello to El Palito at the mouth of the River Aguas Calientes, after which the line mostly followed the course of the river to cross the mountains of the Venezuelan Coastal Range. There was a climb of 500 metres (1,600 ft).

The gauge was 3 ft 6 in (1,067 mm). The use of a narrow gauge to help with the problems caused by hilly terrain was consistent with the principles of the engineer Robert Fairlie, who was involved in surveying near Puerto Cabello in the 1870s.

=== Rack section ===
Reaching the summit presented technical difficulties. In accordance with the directions of the engineer John Carruthers, rather than employ a uniform gradient throughout the route, it was decided to build an inclined plane above Las Trincheras for a 4-kilometre (2.5 mi) section. Carruthers had experience of the Fell mountain railway system in New Zealand, but after considering the options it was decided to use the Abt system recently developed for use in the Harz mountains of Germany.

== Stations ==
Valencia's terminus was Camoruco railway station in a suburb 3 kilometres (1.9 mi) from the city center. Plans were made in advance for a tramway from the station to the Plaza Bolívar in the city centre. Initially horse-drawn, the trams were electrified in 1915.

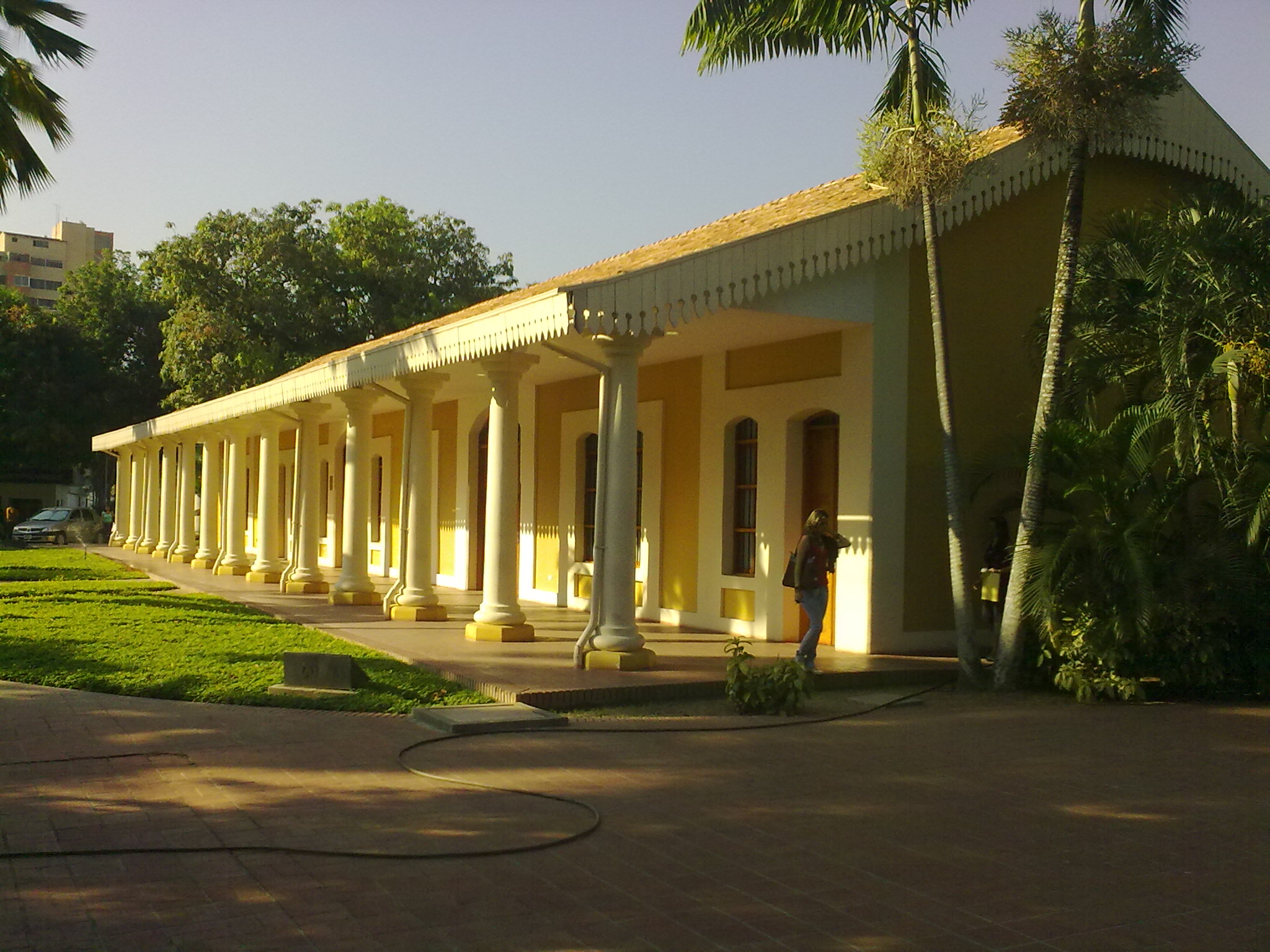
The terminus at Valencia

There were six other stations:

- Naguanagua
- La Entrada
- Las Trincheras, a locality known for its hot springs,
- El Cambur
- El Palito 10.48148°N 68.1112°W
- Puerto Cabello.

== Inauguration and subsequent history of the railway ==
The railway was inaugurated in February 1888 by Guzman Blanco's successor Hermógenes López. Profitability was affected by the unstable political situation in Venezuela at the end of the 19th century; matters were particularly bad during the revolucion legalistica, the Venezuela civil war of 1892 which brought Joaquín Crespo to power for the second time. The railway sought compensation for damage caused by civil war. Failure to pay such damages was one of the causes of the Venezuelan crisis of 1902–1903 when European powers imposed a naval blockade on Venezuela. In 1916 the railway company received a payment from the Venezuelan Government in final settlement of its guarantee claims.

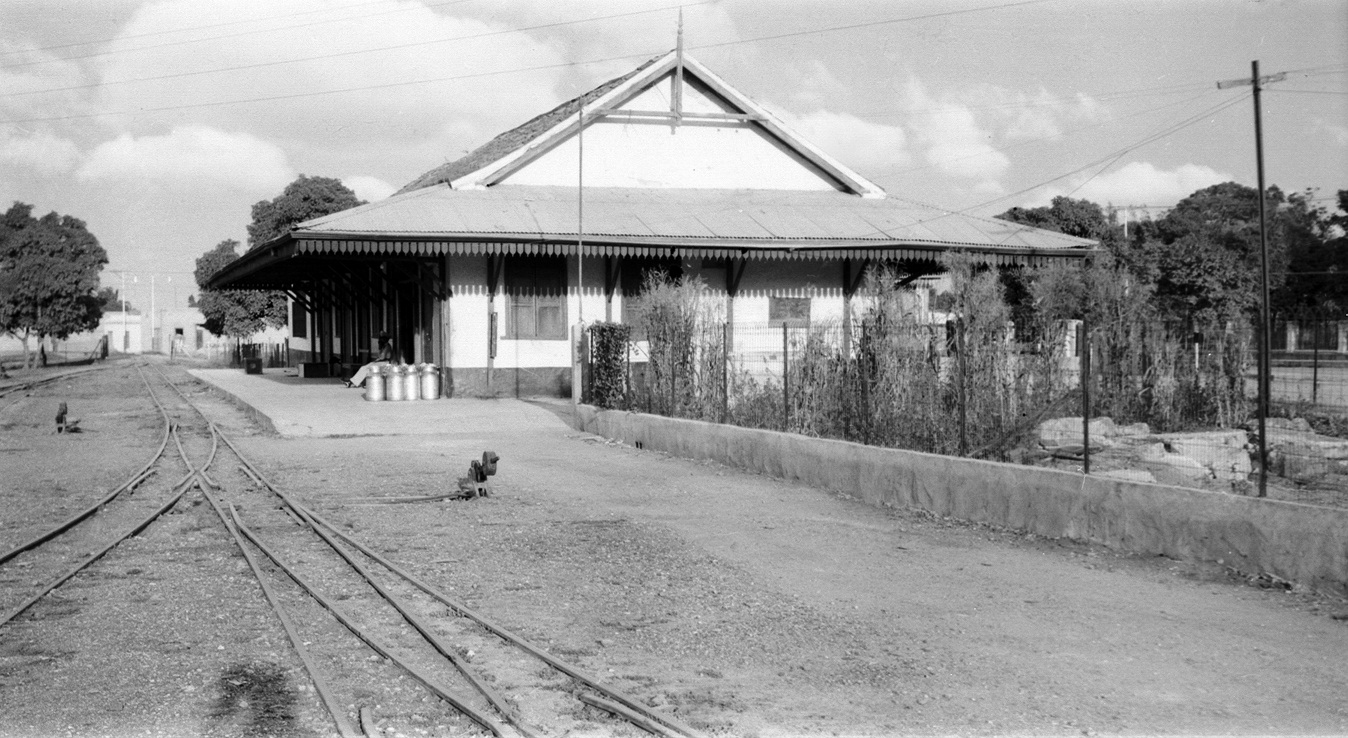
Station on the Bolivar Railway

In 1924 the company merged with the Bolivar Railway Company Limited, a British company which was part of a consortium which owned the Aroa copper mines. The Bolivar Railway was the first to be constructed in Venezuela and linked the mines to the sea at Tucacas. The two lines were operated somewhat differently. The Bolivar Railway had a 2 ft gauge and used oil as a fuel, whereas the Puerto Cabello and Bolivar Railway had a broader gauge and was still using coal apart from the rack section. However, it was proposed that track should be laid to link the two lines, giving the Bolivar Railway access to Puerto Cabello, a better port than Tucacas. The mines were abandoned in 1936

== Later railways ==
The same gauge was used by the slightly later Great Venezuela Railway, a German project which ran to Valencia from Caracas. When the Great Venezuela Railway opened in 1894 the two lines were separate, but track was eventually laid to connect Valencia's two termini, Camoruco and San Blas.

In the 21st century work began on a new railway from Puerto Cabello to La Encrucijada, a transport hub in Aragua State. The project was planned by the State Railways Institution. The route partly replicates the Puerto Cabello and Valencia railway, but the scale is more ambitious. The viaducts have been designed with an isolation system to mitigate seismic damage from the interaction of the Caribbean and South American tectonic plates. Among the tunnels is the 7,702-metre (5 mi) Bárbula Tunnel, between Las Trincheras and Naguanagua, which is claimed to be the longest in South America. In 2016 work on the Puerto Cabello railway was described as "irregular and marked by slow payments by the client as a result of the country’s poor economic conditions, mainly related to the drop in the price of oil."

== See also ==
- Rail transport in Venezuela
