= Isabel Blackett =

New Zealand woman artist

- Born: Isabel Mary Blackett; 1864
- Died: 1953 (aged 88–89)
- Other names: Isobel Marie Blackett and Isobel Marie Houston
- Father: John Blackett

Isabel Mary Houston (née Blackett, 1864–1953) was a New Zealand woman artist, who exhibited at the Canterbury Society of Arts, the Fine Arts Association, Wellington, and the New Zealand Academy of Fine Arts. She was the daughter of Engineer-in-Chief for New Zealand, John Blackett.

== Biography ==
Blackett was born in New Zealand, to John Blackett, an engineer, later the Engineer-in-Chief for New Zealand, and Mary Blackett, in 1864.

She exhibited with the Fine Arts Association, Wellington from 1883–1884. In a 1883 Fine Arts Association exhibition, she presented line engravings The Reader and The Winder which were reviewed as "original as to the coloring, which is excellent, and entirely in accord with the subject and the school the pictures belong to." She also submitted Head of a Peasant and Study of New Zealand Flax. In 1883, she won Class 8 – Study of flowers, foliage, or fruit, in oil, for her work Bragmantia and New Zealand Flax came second in the same class. She was awarded £1 1s.

In 1889, she exhibited in Nelson in an exhibition arranged by Morgan Morgan (later Cooke), the art teacher at Nelson Girls' College. She also frequently exhibited at the New Zealand Academy of Fine Arts from 1889 to 1897. In 1899, Blackett exhibited thirty watercolours at Messrs. McGregor, Wright and Co. from her several months in Fiji. At the Canterbury Society of Arts in 1900, Blackett exhibited a watercolour, Alpinao, Fiji, from the same trip.

Blackett was friend of the artist Dolla Richmond, and visited her often, following the Blackett family's move to Wellington. She also corresponded frequently with Mary and Emily Richmond, of J. C. Richmond's family, which are now archived in the National Library of New Zealand.

She married James Houston on 16 October 1907. In 1909, she and her sister went on a European tour for several months.

Houston died in 1953, and in her will, she established the John Blackett Award at the University of Canterbury in memory of her father.
