= The Vogel era =

History of New Zealand between 1873 and 1876

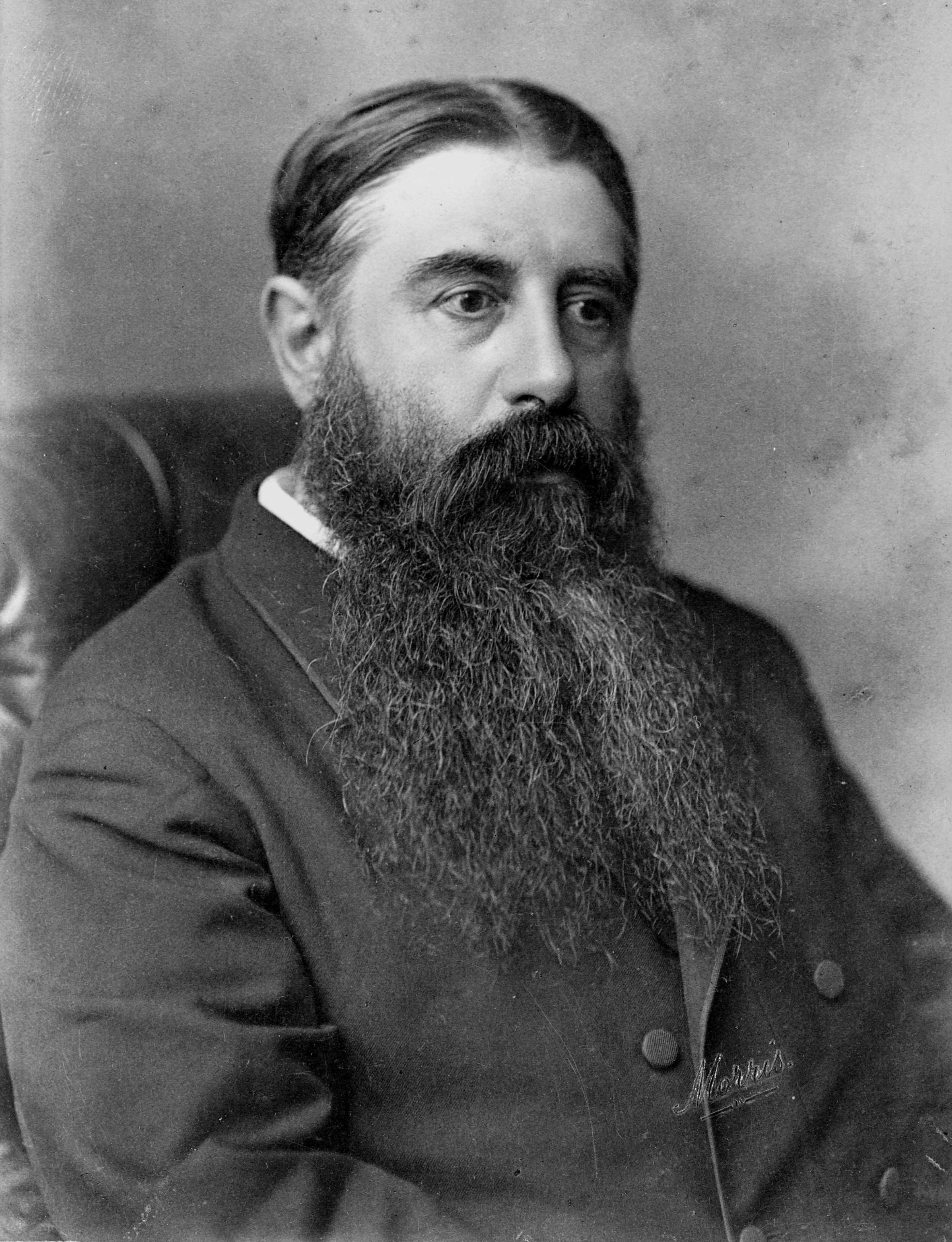
Julius Vogel, c. 1870s

The Vogel era describes the history of New Zealand between 1873 and 1876, when the country adopted an immigration and public works scheme inaugurated by the colonial treasurer, then premier, Julius Vogel to develop the country and to relieve the slump of the late 1860s; to be financed by borrowing overseas. His "Great Public Works Policy" resulted in a large increase in migrants and provision of many new railways, roads and telegraph lines. The railway system developed from a few lines in three gauges to the start of a national network including the main line from Christchurch to Dunedin, though the narrow "Cape gauge" required later upgrading to increase the restricted height and weight limits.

== A Grand Go-ahead Policy ==
Julius Vogel, the premier and colonial treasurer, appreciated that settlement was confined to coastal lands because of inadequate transport, and ("before Lord Keynes was born") propounded a "grand go-ahead policy" to dispel the slump with increased government expenditure on contracts so increasing the community's purchasing power. The country had under fifty miles (80 km) of railway in three gauges, and Vogel proposed to borrow £10 million in ten years, with six million acres along the new railway lines and roads set aside as security.

Vogel became colonial treasurer in the Fox ministry in 1869. On 28 June 1870, he read his financial statement in Parliament, which proposed increased immigration and public works for railways and roads, with railways designed as part of a trunk line in each island. He mentioned "revenue railroads" in America constructed to suit the traffic offered; without expensive stations and suitable for a moderate speed so of low capital cost and constructing the maximum length of line with the available capital. This contrasted with elaborate British and European railways serving densely populated regions. The lines could be improved in accordance with traffic demands. He sought authority to borrow £6 million of the £7.5 million needed to build 2,400 to 2,600 km of railway in the next ten years at a cost of £5,000 per mile (1.6 km). Another £1 million would be needed for other proposals, and 1,030,000 hectares of land would be acquired. His proposals got both positive and negative comments in newspapers.

Vogel's proposals of 1870 were embodied in three acts passed in September 1870; The Immigration and Public Works Act, the Railways Act, and the Immigration and Public Works Loan Act. Vogel went to England where he borrowed £1 or £2 million at 5%; and arranged contracts with the British firm of John Brogden and Sons. While the Fox-Vogel government collapsed in 1872 because of the loss of powers by the provinces, by 1873 Vogel was back. But Vogel's proposals for reserves of land as security for railway loans and for forestry were not accepted. Resistance by the provincial governments resulted in their abolition in 1876 (although Vogel had originally been a "provincialist").

A new Public Works Department was set up in 1870, headed as minister by the Hon William Gisborne, who was replaced by John Davies Ormond in 1871. The engineer selected by Vogel was John Carruthers, a Scot who had worked on railways in Canada, America, Russia, Mauritius and Egypt. Carruthers was engineer-in-chief and was responsible for railway construction; John Blackett was responsible for road construction. Carruthers resigned in 1878 after effectively being demoted by a reorganisation under the new minister James Macandrew.

Vogel (from 1875 Sir Julius Vogel) resigned as premier in 1876, being replaced by Harry Atkinson, and became agent-general in London. Vogel was colonial treasurer in 1869–72, 1872, 1872–75, 1876 and 1884; and was premier 1873-75 and 1876 (governments changed frequently in the 19th-century before the development of political parties).

The public debt had increased from £7.8 million in 1870 to £18.6 million in 1876. The cost of railways per mile was £6000 not £4000, with some bridges needed rebuilding and tunnels relining. But 718 miles (1,156 km) of railway had been built with 427 miles (687 km) under construction. 2,000 miles (3,200 km) of road had been opened, and electric telegraph lines increased from 699 miles (1,125 km) in 1866 to 3,170 miles (5,100 km) in 1876. A record number of immigrants arrived in 1874 (32,000 of the 44,000 were government assisted) and the population rose from 248,000 in 1870 to 399,000 in 1876.

In 1880, New Zealand had almost 1,200 miles of working railway, with more than 75% in the South Island. According to the minister (Richard Oliver) this was one mile of railway for every 406 inhabitants, which compared favourably with America (580 people), Britain (1,961 people), France (2,900 people) and New South Wales (1,108 people). That year, a separate New Zealand Railways Department (NZR) was established to run the railways.

Eventually the worldwide Long Depression of the late 1870s affected New Zealand, with a downturn in 1879, with bad harvests and low prices for wheat and wool. The City of Glasgow Bank collapse in 1878 took out New Zealand and Australian investment capital, as advances had been made against Australian and New Zealand wool consignments and securities e.g. land company stock. Local banks, notably the Bank of New Zealand and the Colonial Bank of New Zealand, were "reckless" and permitted "a frenzy of private borrowing".

The Hall government of 1880 cut back on railway construction; resulting in Wellington businessmen establishing the successful Wellington and Manawatu Railway Company which built the West Coast Railway from Wellington to the Manawatu. In the five years to 1885, only 317 miles were added to the national network, compared with 1,032 miles in the previous five years.

== Vogel railways ==
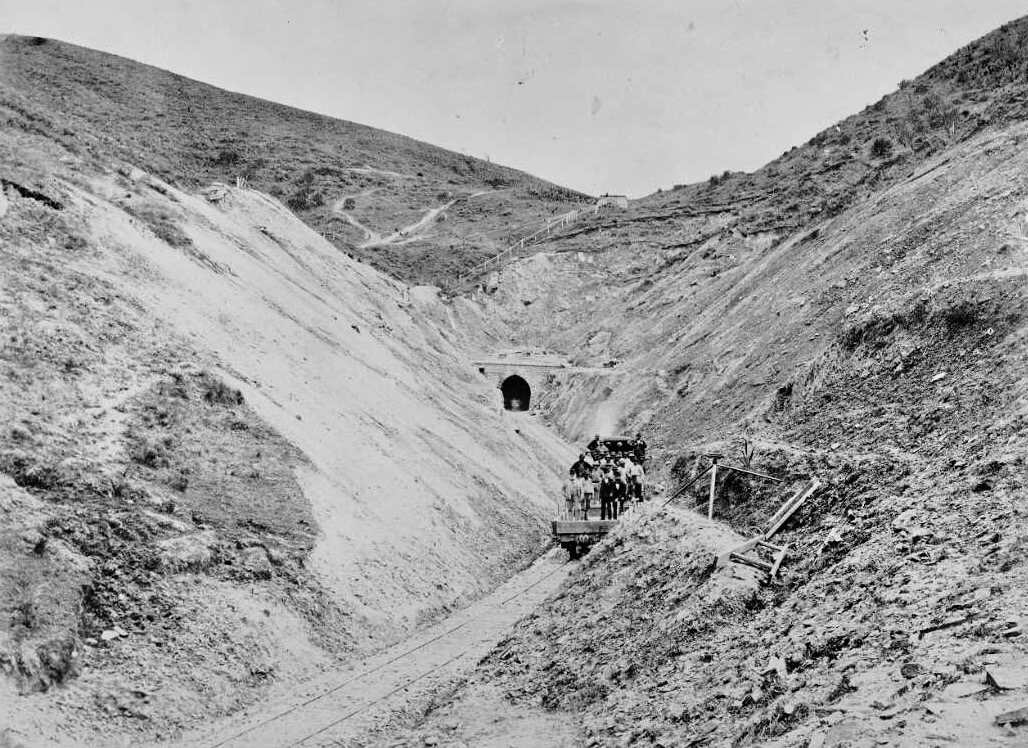
Chain Hills Tunnel on the Dunedin to Clutha railway in about 1874

Vogel proposed narrow-gauge railways as easier to construct through the rugged landscape. The "pilot" was the 59 miles (95 km) Dunedin to Clutha Railway; the first 10 km (6.2 mi) section opened in 1874. Priority was given to the completion of the trunk line between Christchurch and Dunedin. The gradients were not to exceed 1 in 50 (2%) and curves were not to be sharper than 200 metres (9.9 chains) radius. Construction cost was estimated at £3,000 per km, compared with the Canterbury Provincial Railways which averaged £8,000 per km (excluding the £200,000 for the Lyttelton Tunnel). But while the earthworks for the Canterbury Plains were low or "mere scratching", the expense in crossing the wide Canterbury braided rivers was considerable, despite looping inland to get shorter and more stable crossing points for the Rakaia River (an 1,818-metre or 5,965-foot long combined road and rail bridge built in 1873) and the Rangitata River (with two bridges).

The 1870 Act specified a uniform rail gauge for the country; although the act just specified that the rail gauge was not to exceed 3 ft 6 in (1,067 mm), the Cape gauge as used at that time in Canada and Norway was chosen, as recommended by Charles Fox and Sons of London. Lines were constructed with lightweight track, steep gradients, tight curves and light wooden bridges. The 40 lb/yd (19.8 kg/m) iron rails was later replaced with (now cheaper) 50 lb/yd (24.8 kg/m) steel rails; and then with heavier 55 or 70 lb/yd (27.3 or 34.7 kg/m) rails in the Liberal era of 1891–1912, increasing the maximum axle load from six tonnes (5.9 long tons; 6.6 short tons) to 16 or 18 tonnes (15.7 or 17.7 long tons; 17.6 or 19.8 short tons) with 100 lb/yd (49.6 kg/m) rail. But the tight tunnels with a height limit of 11 1/2 ft (3.5 m) led to expensive lowering of track in tunnels or "daylighting" them to accommodate intermodal containers on flat wagons in the 20th century.

Charles Rous-Marten writing in the English Railway Magazine in 1899, described the decision to use a narrow gauge in New Zealand as a grevious and irrepairable blunder. But some 1000 miles (1604 km) of railways had been opened within seven years, and in 1878 the first inter-city route, complete with stylish American-built locomotives was ready to go into operation (The Main South Line, Christchurch-Dunedin-Invercargill). Many railways in Africa (e.g. South Africa) and Asia (e.g. Japan) use either the Cape gauge (1067 mm) or the meter gauge (1000 mm).

Vogel had contracted John Brogden and Sons of England to construct six lines, for land as well as cash and the right to bring out 10,000 immigrants or "navvies". The six sections of a future national network went out from Auckland, Wellington, Napier, Picton, Oamaru and Invercargill.

=== Locomotives ===
The first NZR loco was the English built NZR F class tank engine, which could reach 40 mph (64 km/h), and even on long steep banks could "climb like a cat". The first tender locomotives for the NZR were the English built NZR J class (1874) which could reach 50 mph (80 km/h) downhill with an express.

However, the new NZR chief mechanical engineer Allison D. Smith believed that American locomotives would be preferable for the light track used. The London agent-general's consulting engineer, R. M. Brereton, obtained opinions from two English firms Neilson and the Vulcan Foundry: both agreed that British locomotives were "excessively rigid" and that there was "absurd conservatism" in this country. American builders used bar frames rather than the heavier plate frames used in Britain. Brereton said in his letter that:

The American builder excels in the system of framing and counterbalancing and in the design of the crank, axles, etc, so that the engine may run remarkably easily round sharp curves and work not only the light roads but also diminish wear and tear on the solid roads, and at the same time increase the tractive effort force. The English engine is a very heavy affair, and, in running, it not only wears and tears itself out very rapidly, but also the roadway, and by its unsteadiness and jar, fatigues drivers and firemen .... (and the jarring) fatigues drivers and firemen .... The two most reliable and best American locomotive firms were Baldwin and Rogers.

So the first American locomotives were the NZR K class (1877) with two batches from Rogers of New Jersey, ordered through New York consulting engineer Walton Evans. They were very successful despite initial Canterbury apprehension at their light construction, and hauled the first express from Christchurch to Dunedin in 1878.

Further American orders from NZR were placed with Baldwin of Pennsylvania for the NZR T class of 1879 and the NZR N class and NZR O class of 1885. Baldwin also supplied most of the WMR locomotives.

The P class and V class locomotives ordered from Nasmyth Wilson of England in 1885 were delayed and overweight "for reasons still not entirely clear", and the Baldwin-built N and O locomotives were delivered promptly and to the specified weight, creating a favourable impression.

A later comment is that:

American builders delivered more speedily and at a lower price. Typically, their locomotives steamed more freely but tended to be less durable and have higher running costs. In the early days, when local design capabilities were limited, faster deliveries at a lower price had a considerable appeal. However, as NZR began to develop its own design preferences, the willingness of British manufacturers to follow those eventually won out. American manufacturers, whose low costs were based on mass-produced components, had no wish to build to NZR's designs, only to its specifications.

=== Rolling stock ===
Early passenger carriages were English style 4 or 6 wheel carriages. Some 6 wheel carriages had rigid centre axles and some with play in the outer axles. But neither were satisfactory in New Zealand, and in 1878 the first North American style bogie carriages from America proved to be much more suitable. So the Addington Workshops constructed similar carriages, and 73 12.2-metre (40 ft) carriages were in use on the Hurunui-Bluff section by 1886. Most were "composites" with 1st and 2nd class compartments and clerestory roofs. Carriages were now mostly American-style open "saloon" cars rather than British style carriages with small compartments and a side corridor. From the 1890s turtle-back style roofs were used. Early wagons were of 2.6 m (8 ft 6 in) wheelbase with four wheels, but in 1886 9.14 m (30 ft 0 in) wheelbase bogie wagons were introduced.

== Immigrant Cottages ==
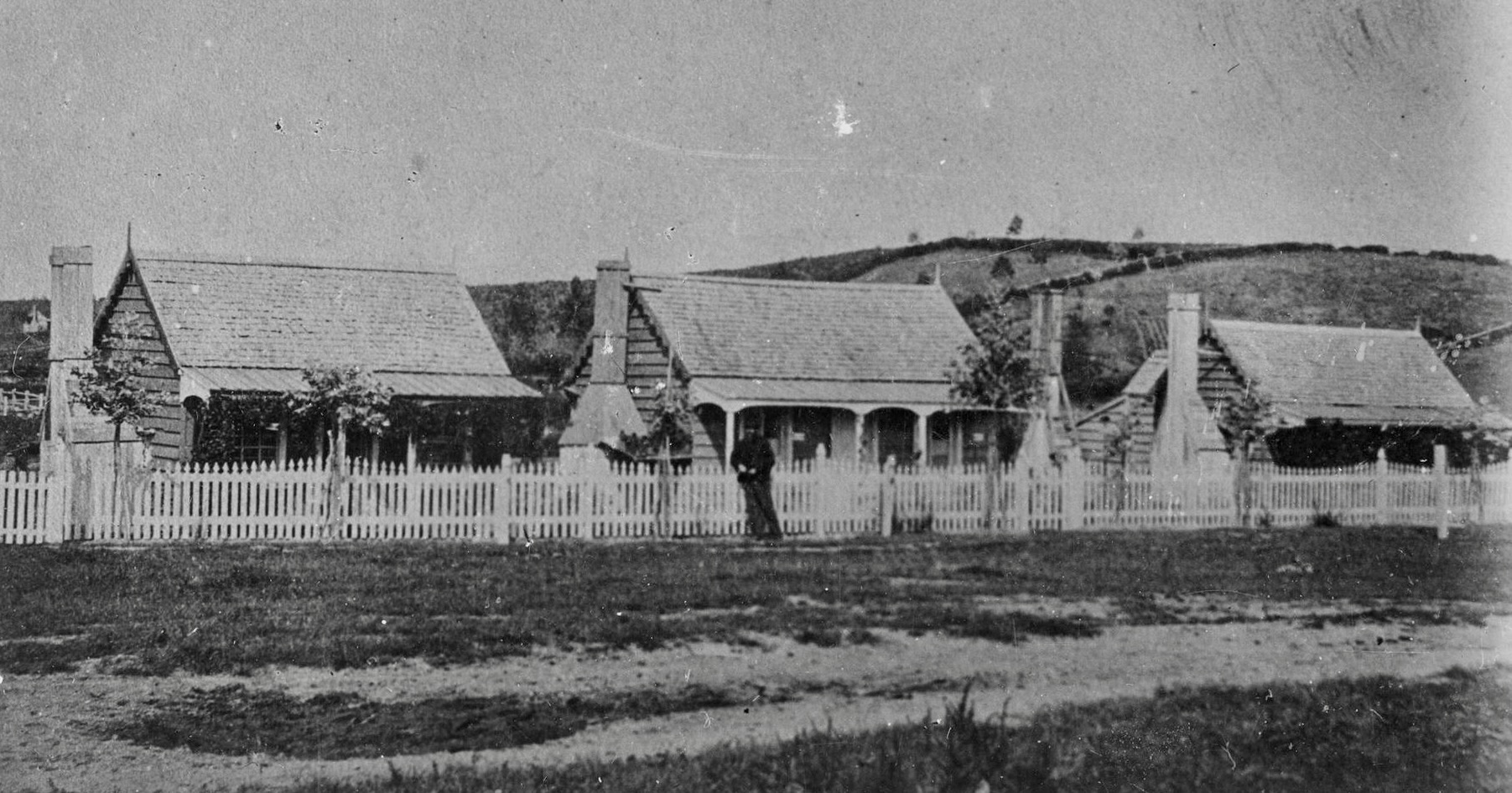
Immigrant Cottages in Hamilton

In the mid-1870s the loans were also used to build 4-roomed cottages, to encourage immigrants to move to areas needing labour. They were built of timber and corrugated iron, so as to be portable. There was criticism that the cottages were a waste of money, remained empty, were occupied by people unsuited to the work available, or were in the wrong places. Some of the cottages have survived, as they were built of kauri and used brass screws. The uninhabited cottages were put to other uses, such as a church, or council chambers.
