= Valencia Cathedral (Venezuela) =

Cathedral Basilica of Our Lady of Succour
- Catedral Basílica de Nuestra Señora del Socorro
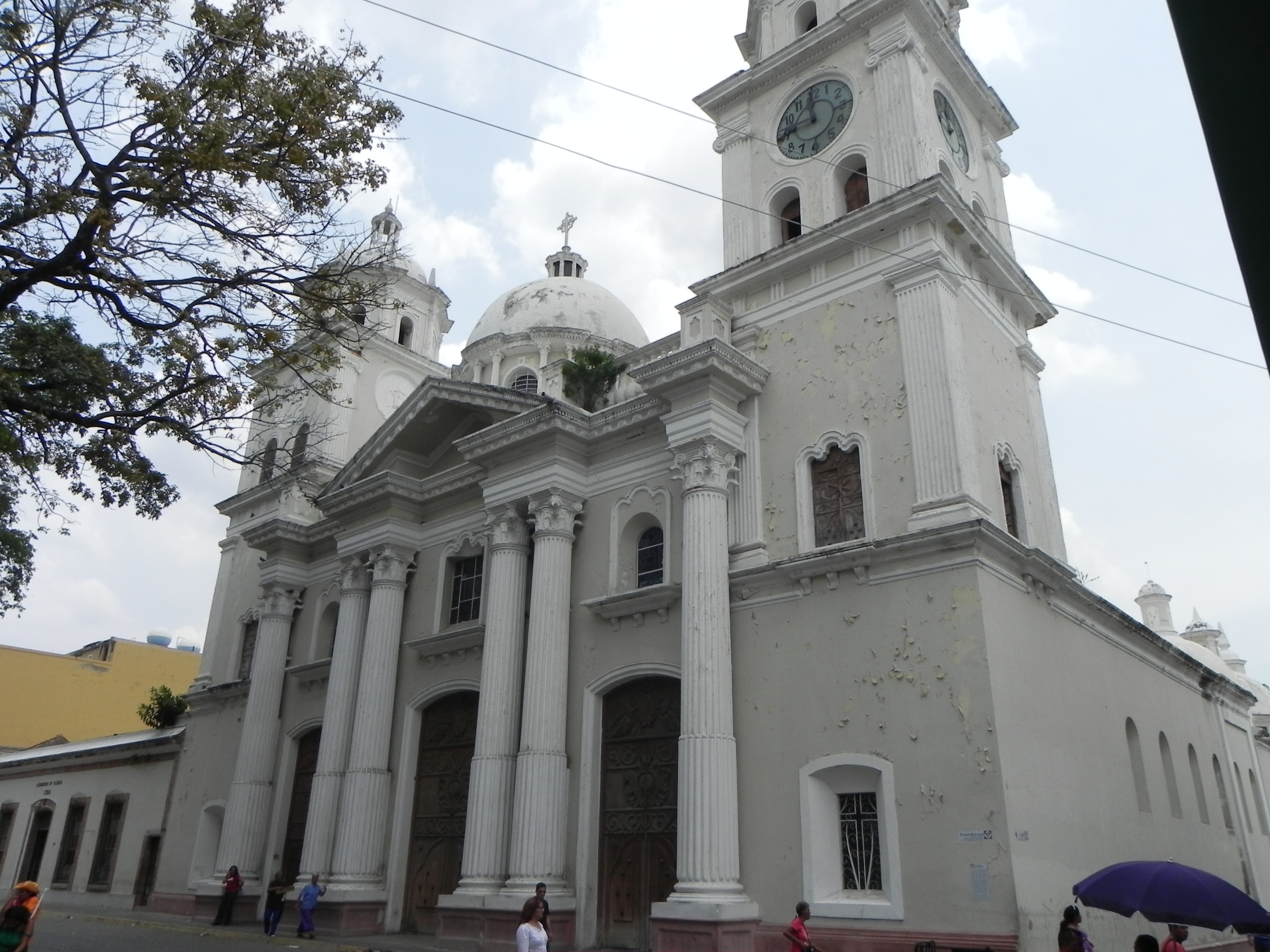
- Cathedral Basilica of Our Lady of Succour
- Location: Valencia
- Country: Venezuela
- Denomination: Roman Catholic Church

The Cathedral Basilica of Our Lady of Succour (Spanish: Catedral Basílica de Nuestra Señora del Socorro), more commonly known as the Cathedral of Valencia, is a cathedral of the Roman Catholic Church in Valencia, Venezuela. It is situated in the center of the city, opposite the Plaza Bolivar.

== History ==
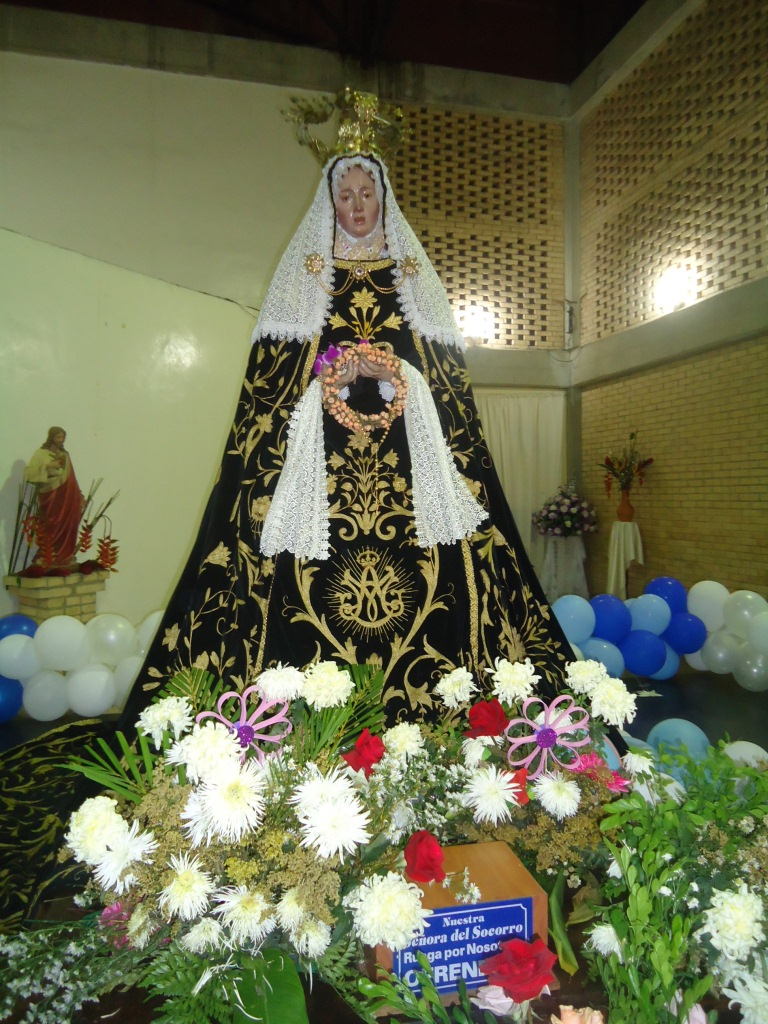
The dolorous image of “Our Lady of Succour” crowned by Pope Pius X in 1910.

Valencia was founded by Spanish settlers in 1555. Nuestra Señora del Socorro was built as the local parish church during the colonial period, circa 1580.

Upon the establishment of the Diocese of the city of Valencia in 1922, the church was raised to the status of cathedral. It seats the bishops of the diocese, beginning with bishop Francisco Antonio Granadillo (1922-1927). Gregorio Adam led the diocese from 1947-1971.

On 10 February 1960, Pope John XXIII issued a decree, Urbi Valentinæ, which praised the piety of diocese, celebrated its fiftieth anniversary of coronation, and raised the shrine to the status of Minor Basilica. The diocese of Valencia was elevated to the rank of archdiocese in 1974.

The cathedral features neoclassical architecture, and is home to the Marian image of Our Lady of Help, a work granted a Pontifical decree of canonical coronation by Pope Pius X on 13 November 1910.

=== Modifications and restorations ===
The building was modified in 1710, 1818-1820, 1830, and again in 1942. The 19th century architectural modifications gave the building its present neoclassical style.

The church underwent a thorough restoration from 2013-2016, carried out by architect Sara de Atienzar and restorer Fernando de Tovar.

== See also ==
- Roman Catholicism in Venezuela
- Caracas Cathedral
