= List of Valencia Metro stations (Venezuela) =

The following are Valencia Metro stations:

== Current route ==
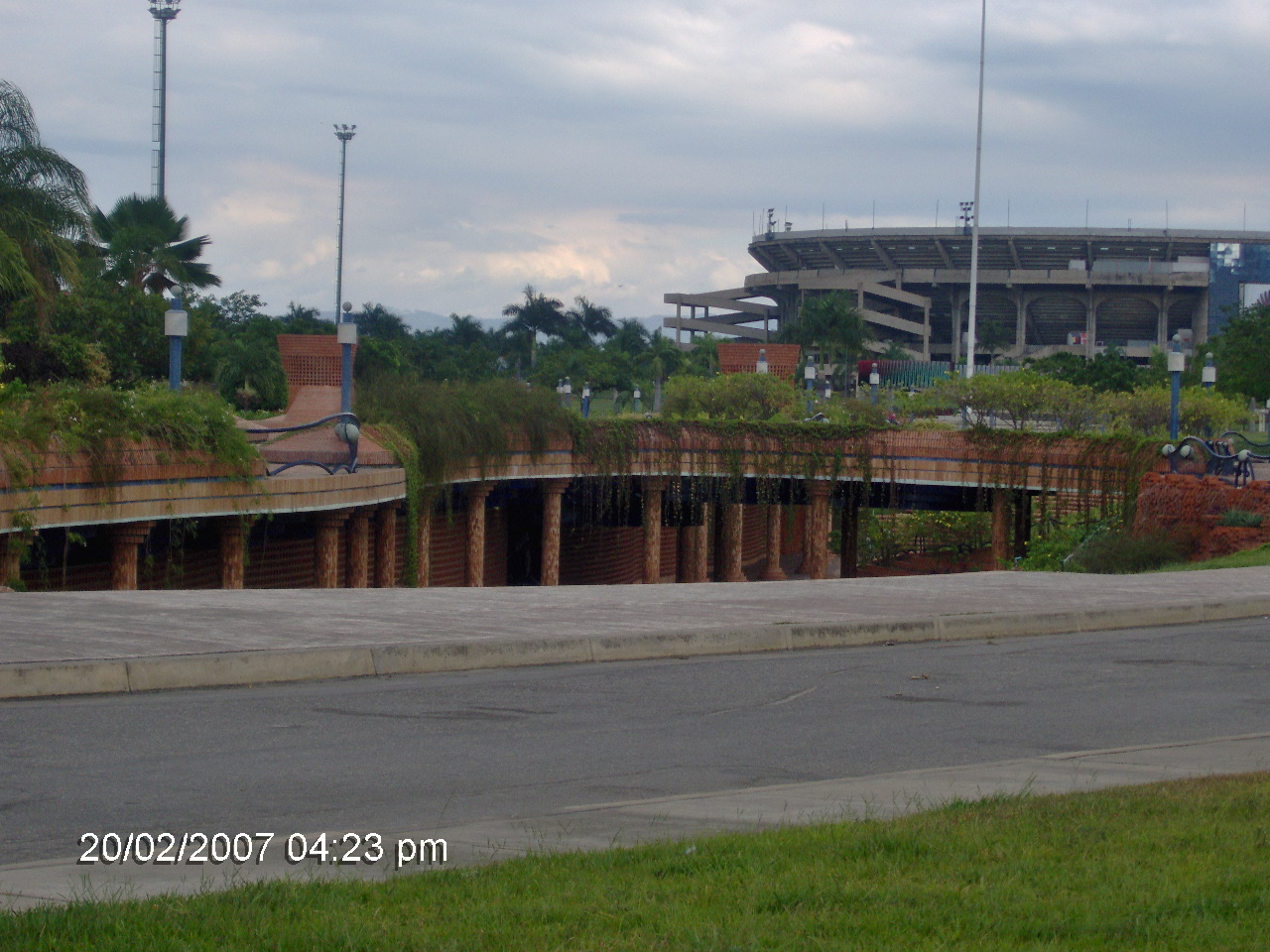
Entrance to the Monumental station with Plaza Los Toros stadium in background

Operational

The stations are in the Valencia and Naguanagua municipalities and is over 6 km long.

- Monumental, formerly named Plaza de Toros: One of the main terminals of the Metro was one of the first stations to open in November 2007 and is still one of the busiest stations on this line. The station was designed by Enrique Sardi.
- Las Ferias: The station is situated on Las Ferias Avenue and was opened in December 2007, the station is near the Arturo Michelena International Airport.
- Cedeño: This is the second terminal on the Metro. It is situated between Bolivar Avenue and Cedeño Avenue.
- Santa Rosa: This station opened in November 2007. It is located on the same road as the Las Ferias station.
- Palotal: This station is close to the Santa Rosa station.
- Lara: This station is on the Lara Avenue. There is a transfer point between Line 1 and Line 2 that operates on this station.
- Michelena: This station is located on the Las Ferias Avenue and 91st Street. It started service on 2007.

Under construction

- Francisco de Miranda: This station is under construction however trains do go past this station. Passengers from the Naguanagua municipality use this station. It was inaugurated on April 29, 2015.
- Rafael Urdaneta: The station is under construction but is still operational. It was opened to the public on April 29, 2015.

== Future constructions ==
These listed stations are due to be completed by 2020.

Line 1

- Simon Bolivar
- Paramacay
- Caprenco
- La Campiña
- La Granja
- Tarapio

Line 2

- La Florida
- La Guacamaya
- Cementerio
- Hospital
- Aranzazu
- Branger
- Uslar
- Estadio
- Bomberos
- Henry Ford
