= Hermógenes López =

Provisional President of Venezuela (1887–1888)

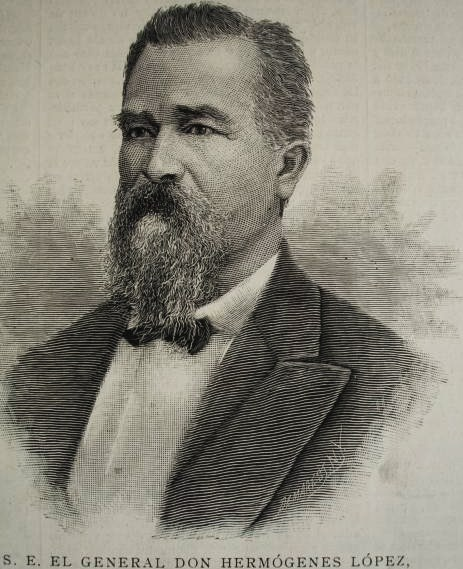

25th President of Venezuela
- Provisional; 8 August 1887 – 2 July 1888
- Preceded by: Antonio Guzmán Blanco
- Succeeded by: Juan Pablo Rojas

Personal details
- Born: 19 April 1830 Naguanagua, Carabobo, Gran Colombia
- Died: 17 December 1898 (aged 68) Valencia, Carabobo
- Party: Liberal Party
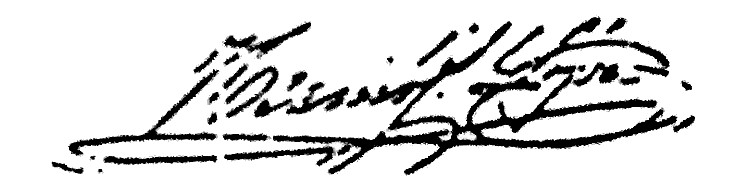
- Signature

Hermógenes López (19 April 1830, in Naguanagua, Carabobo – 17 December 1898, in Valencia, Carabobo) was a Venezuelan soldier, farmer and politician who served as provisional president of his country between 1887 and 1888, after the resignation of General Antonio Guzmán Blanco who went into voluntary exile in Paris.

There is scarce information about his childhood, which appears to have been limited to elementary education and farm work. From the arrival of José Tadeo Monagas and José Gregorio Monagas to the presidency (1848–1858), he entered into military activity, being part of the revolutions and battles of those decades; after that he returned to his life as farmer. López became military leader of Nirgua in 1858, and participated in the 1862 campaign of Carabobo, that overthrew its head of government, General Marcos López.

López, was the head of Carabobo state after an electoral fight against General Gregorio Cedeño (May 1881). He also served as president (governor) of Yaracuy state. Because of the retirement of Guzmán Blanco, he assumed the presidency of Venezuela on 8 August 1887 presiding a transition period, which concluded on 2 July 1888, when Juan Pablo Rojas Paul assumed the presidency.

Hermógenes López's provisional government enjoyed the active cooperation of the Liberal Party and the society. During his term in office, he inaugurated the railroad between Puerto Cabello and Valencia and an underwater cable with Europe (February 1888). In April 1888, the remains of General José Antonio Páez were returned to Venezuela. This act was carried out against the will of Guzmán Blanco, who considered Paéz as an oligarch.

Hermógenes López died in 1898.

== Hermógenes López cabinet (1887-1888) ==
Ministries
OFFICE	NAME	TERM
President	Hermógenes López	1887–1888
Home Affairs	Francisco González Guinán	1887–1888
Outer Relations	Diego Bautista Urbaneja	1887–1888
Finance	Juan Pablo Rojas Paúl	1887–1888
Development	Jacinto Pachano	1887–1888
Public Instruction	José María Ortega Martínez	1887–1888
War and Navy	Francisco Carabaño	1887–1888
Public Works	José Cecilio Castro	1887–1888
Public Credit	Ángel Álamo Herrera	1887–1888
Secretary of Government	Rafael González Delgado	1887–1888
Governor of Caracas	Juan Quevedo	1887–1888

== See also ==
- Presidents of Venezuela

Political offices
Preceded by Antonio Guzmán Blanco	President of Venezuela; 1887–1888	Succeeded by Juan Pablo Rojas
