= El Carabobeño =

- The newspaper of the center
- Founder: Eladio Alemán Sucre
- Founded: 1 September 1933
- Language: Spanish
- City: Naguanagua
- Country: Venezuela
- Website: www.el-carabobeno.com

El Carabobeño has been one of the most popular newspapers in the Central Region of Venezuela. The offices of the newspaper are located in Naguanagua, north of the city of Valencia in the state of Carabobo. Its main competitor in the area is Notitarde.

In 2016 it discontinued its print edition citing problems sourcing newsprint. It has continued online.

== History ==
=== Foundation ===
The newspaper was founded by Eladio Alemán Sucre on 1 September 1933 under the dictatorship of Juan Vicente Gómez. Eladio Alemán Sucre was forced into exile under the dictatorship, with the newspaper working under the area's best intellectuals, until Vicente Gómez's death in 1935. In 1948, the newspaper was headquartered in the Ayacucho building and by 1955, the newspaper had begun printing in a more "standard" size after their printing press was updated.

=== Growth ===
In 1976 after successfully growing, the newspaper moved into a new building on Soubrette Avenue in central Valencia. At the new facility, El Carabobeño purchased a new electronic system for processing that was one of the most advanced in Latin America at that period of time.

In 1997, a newly built headquarters for El Carabobeño in Naguanagua, a city north of Venezuela, was inaugurated by President Rafael Caldera, who called the newspaper "an example for the Latin American Journalism". The headquarters was designed by Marisol Alemán de López in a contemporary architecture, with the facility featuring an advanced electronic system, a museum on Venezuela's journalism, the original equipment used by the newspaper, two murals by Braulio Salazar as well as one auditorium and two convention halls at the Eladio Alemán Sucre Cultural Center.

=== Cessation of printed newspaper ===
Following nearly 83 years of printing newspapers to the Venezuelan public, on 17 March 2016, the newspaper released its final edition of its physical newspaper, discontinuing the use of printed material. On its final front-page editorial, El Carabobeño explained that the government agency that has the responsibility of distributing newsprint had not attempted to sell the necessary resources to the newspaper. The act of withholding resources from media organizations was a common practice of censorship in Venezuela under the Bolivarian government.

== Awards and accolades ==
El Carabobeño won the National Journalism Award in 1968, 1977 and 1983 and in 2009, the Inter American Press Association (IAPA) awarded El Carabobeño the 2009 Excellence in Journalism Award in the category "Newspaper in Education".

== See also ==
- List of newspapers in Venezuela
