= Naguanagua Botanical Garden =

Botanical garden in Carabobo, Venezuela

- Jardín Botánico de Naguanagua
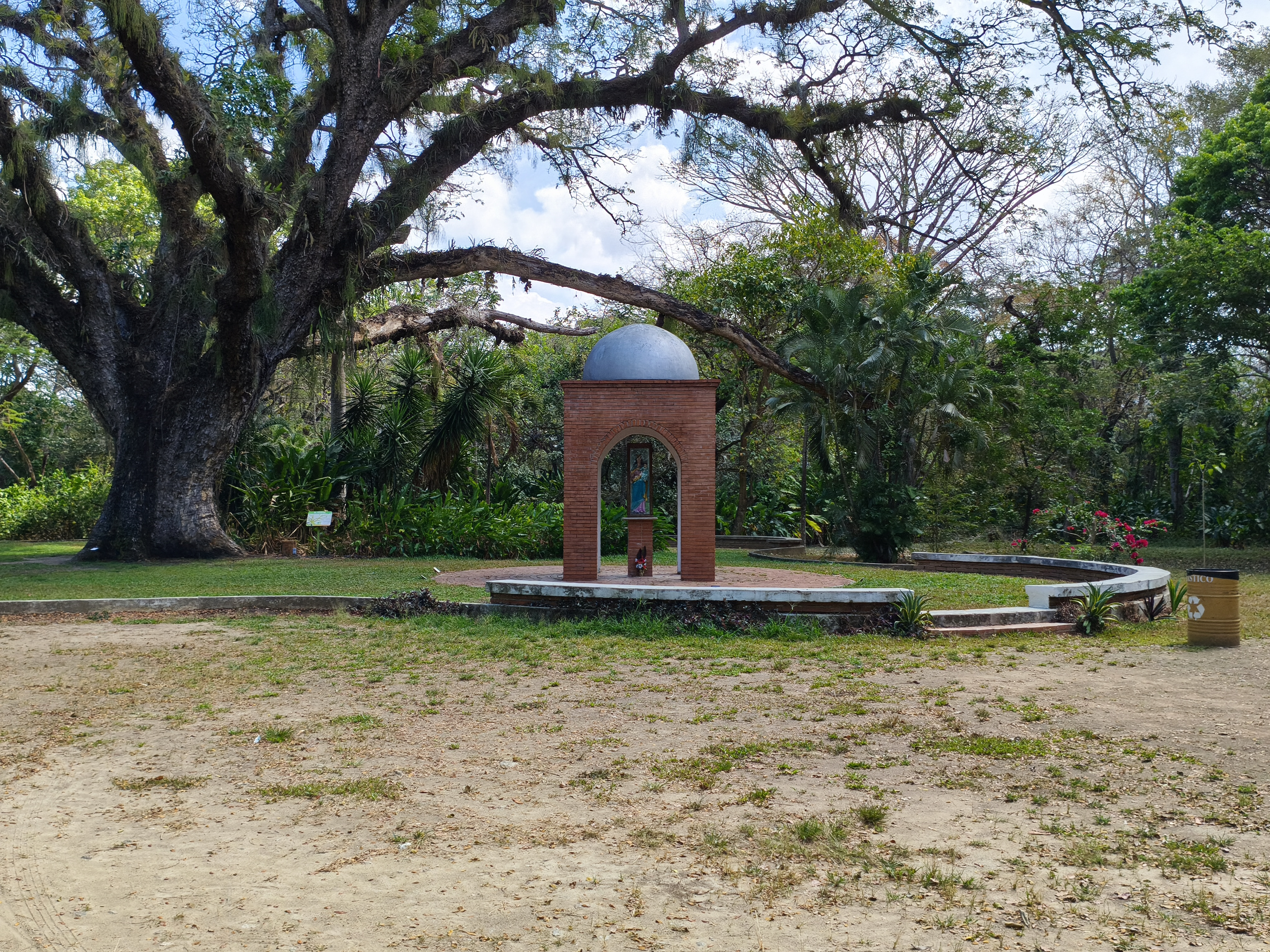
- The Shrine of Mary, Help of Christians beside the Garden’s Saman tree
- Interactive map of Naguanagua Botanical Garden
- Type: Botanical garden
- Location: Naguanagua, Venezuela
- Area: 15 hectares (37 acres)
- Opened: April 2, 1991
- Operator: Fundación Jardín Botánico Naguanagua
- Website: jardinbotaniconaguanagua.org.ve

The Naguanagua Botanical Garden (Spanish: Jardín Botánico de Naguanagua), also known as Bachiller José Saer D'Eguert Botanical Garden, is a botanical garden located south of the city of Naguanagua, Carabobo State in the South American country of Venezuela. It has a free area of about 15 hectares, with more than 200 adult trees.

== History ==
Its history begins when a group of people from the community, interested in improving the environmental quality, proposed the idea of creating a protected area to the municipal council that accedes and finally the 2 of April 1991 the mayoralty decides to create the Naguanagua Botanical Garden Foundation. The land for the garden was donated by the Salesian Agronomic Society.

== Plants ==
The vegetation existing in the area of the Botanical Garden consists of three plant formations or associations: Remnant of a semi-deciduous forest (trees lose their leaves during drought), aquatic vegetation associated with a seasonal wetland and a savanna of anthropic origin (created by man) with grasses and scattered trees.

== Location ==
It is located in the North Guaparo behind the Olympic Village of Carabobo to the south of the Municipality Naguanagua in the Carabobo State.

== See also ==
- List of national parks of Venezuela
- Caracas Botanical Garden

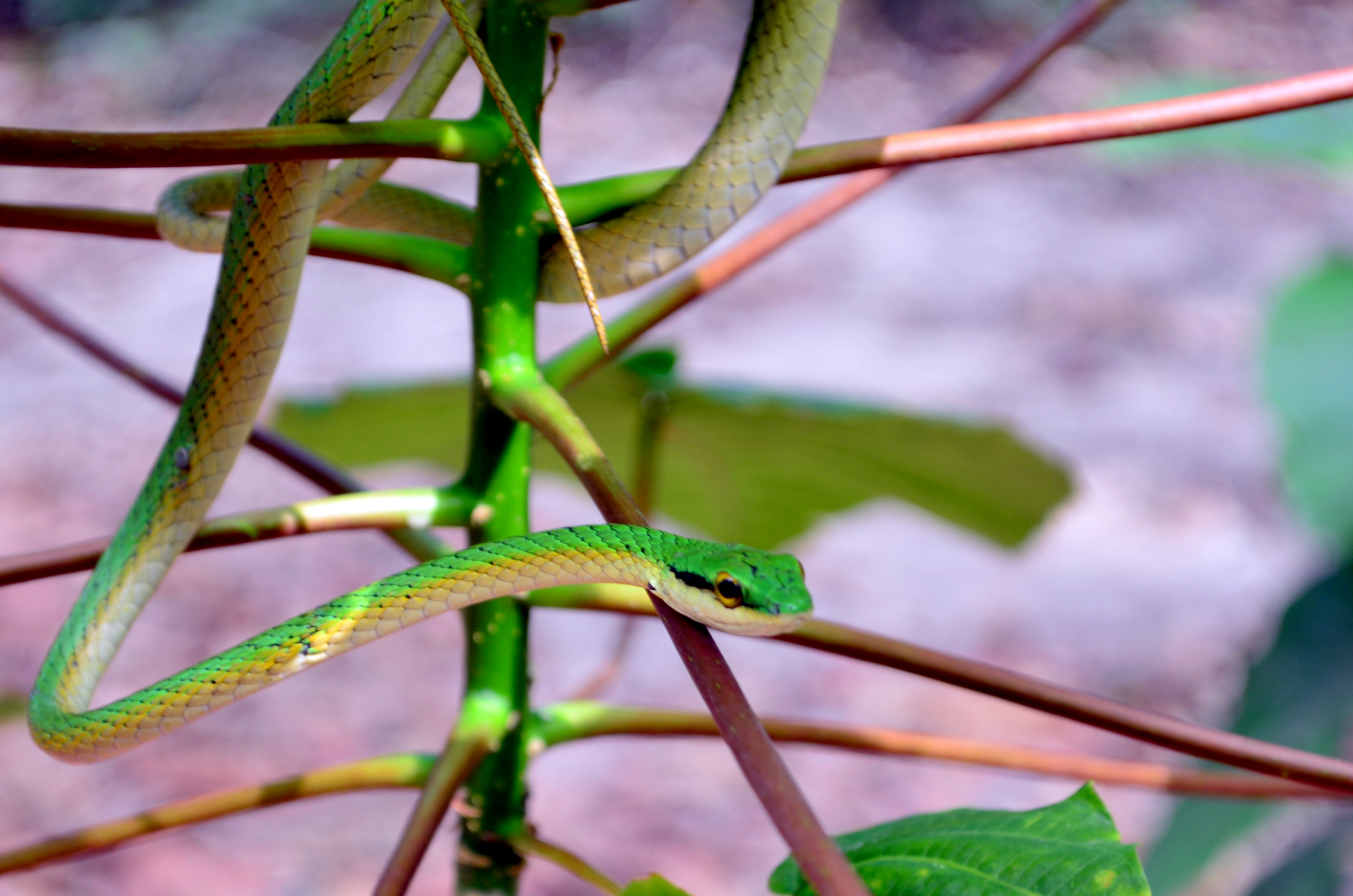
A snake in the Garden
