= John Carruthers (engineer) =

John Carruthers (21 June 1836–2 September 1914) was a British engineer and economic theorist from a Scottish literary family. He was born in Inverness, Inverness-shire, Scotland on 21 June 1836.

He worked on railway construction in Canada, America, Russia, Mauritius and Egypt before being recruited by the Premier of New Zealand Julius Vogel for his great Public Works policy of the 1870s which emphasized railway construction and immigration. He was made Engineer-in Chief of the new Public Works Department, responsible for railway construction.

He resigned in 1878 after the new Minister of Works (James Macandrew) effectively demoted him to having charge of the North Island only.

In the 1880s he was resident in Venezuela, where he was involved in the construction of the Puerto Cabello and Valencia Railway, which connected the country's second city to the coast. This project was financed by a British company. The line opened in 1888, and included a rack and pinion section at Trincheras. Carruthers had experience of the Fell mountain railway system in New Zealand, but chose the Abt system for this line.

In 1889 he moved to Argentina to work on the Córdoba North Western Railway. Returning to London in the 1890s, he continued to be a consultant on New Zealand projects until his death.

== Bibliography ==
- Carruthers, John (1877), "On Mill's Fourth Fundamental Theorem respecting Capital", Transactions of the New Zealand Institute
- Carruthers, John (1878), "On Some of the Terms used in Political Economy", Transactions of the New Zealand Institute
- Carruthers, John (1883), Communal and Commercial Economy: Some Elementary Theorems of the Political Economy of Communal and Commercial Societies; Together with An Examination of the Correlated Theorems of the Pseudo-Science of Wealth as Taught by Ricardo and Mill, Edward Stanford, London.
- Carruthers, John (1884), "The Industrial Mechanism of a Socialist Society", To-Day, November 1884.
- Carruthers, John (1885?), "Political Economy of Socialism", pamphlet of a lecture to the Hammersmith Branch of the Socialist League, London.
- Carruthers, John (1894), "Socialism and Radicalism", Hammersmith Socialist Society, London.
- Carruthers, John (1915), Economic Studies, Chiswick Press, London.
