= Great Venezuela Railway =

Railway in Venezuela

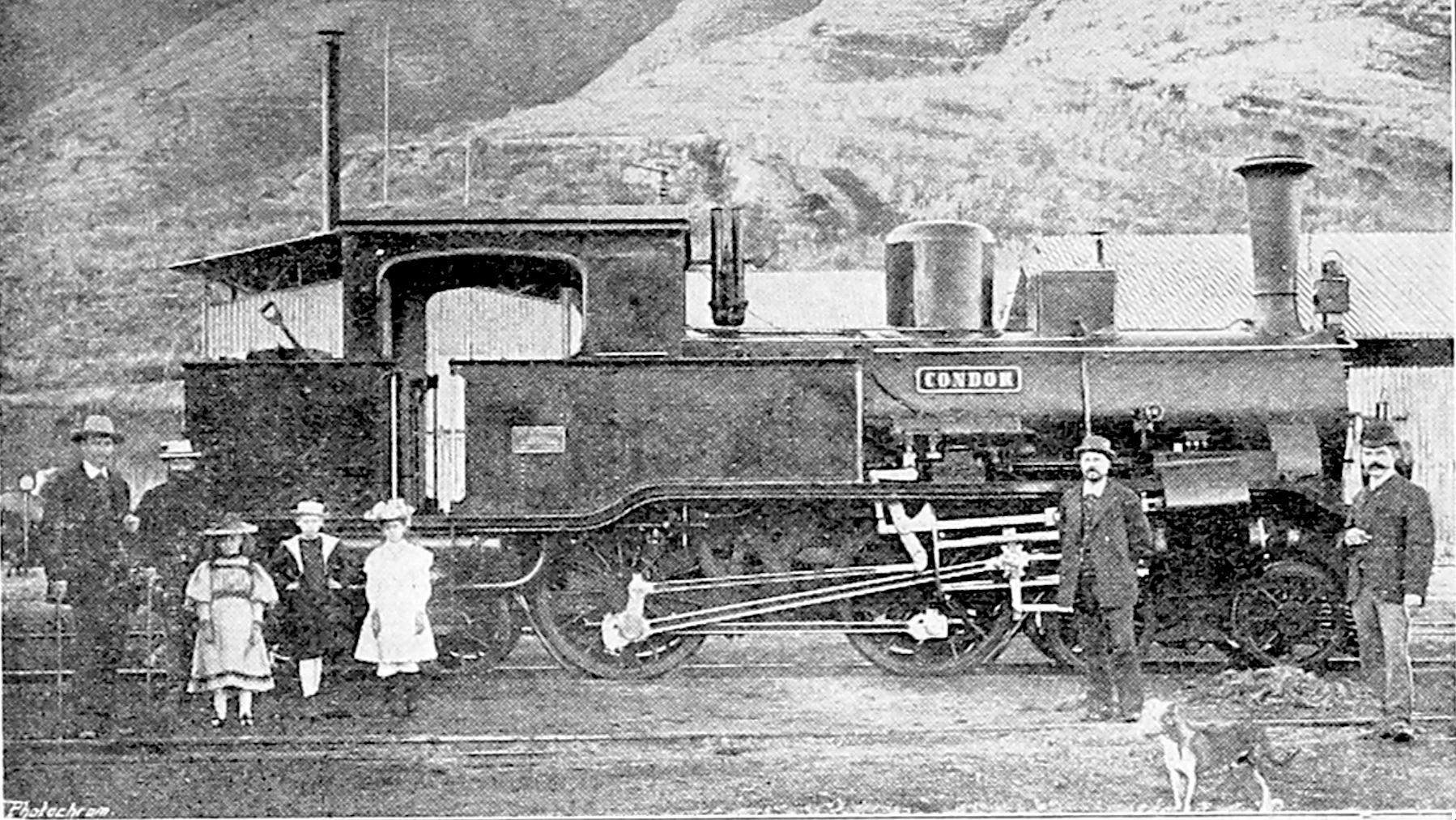
4-4-4T 11 m (36 ft) long locomotive with 1,280 mm (50.39 in) driving wheels built by Hartmann's (Sächsische Maschinenfabrik) at Chemnitz and fitted with Walschaerts valve gear

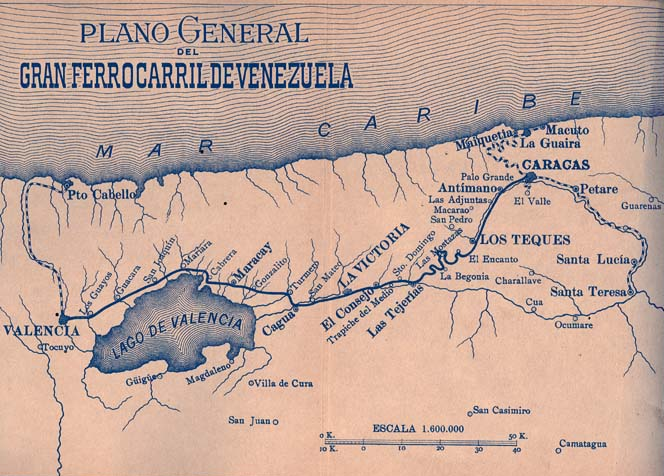
Map of the Great Venezuela Railway and connecting lines

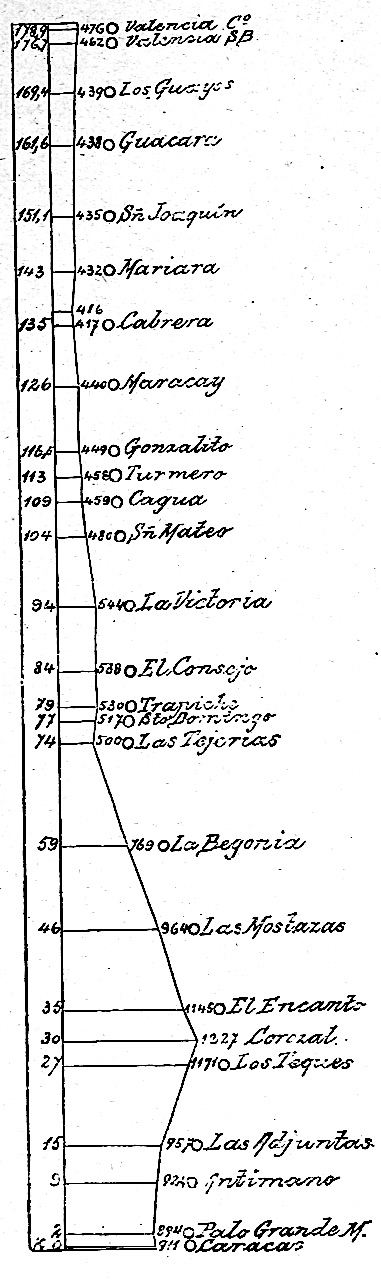
Gradient profile, showing El Encanto near the summit of the line

The Great Venezuela Railway (Gran Ferrocarril de Venezuela) was a 179-kilometre (111 mi) 3 ft 6 in (1,067 mm) railway from Caracas to Valencia. It proved difficult to recoup the initial investment. Compensation due to the railway became a notable cause of the Venezuelan crisis of 1902–1903. It fell into disrepair through the early 20th century and the last train ran in 1966.

Along with other 19th-century railway projects in Venezuela, it faced the challenge that the capital and much of the population were located in mountainous districts. The line was impressive from an engineering perspective, and efforts have been made to preserve part of it as a heritage line. The railway remains the longest to have been completed in Venezuela.

== Origin ==
Friedrich Krupp AG contracted with the Venezuelan government in 1888 to build the railway in exchange for £12,800 per kilometer to be repaid at 7 percent interest. Disconto-Gesellschaft financed the project; and terms were renegotiated at £11,000 per kilometer in 1891. The railway was completed in February 1894.

== Description ==
The railway replaced a difficult carriage road through mountainous terrain. Caracas is at an altitude of 3,000 feet (910 metres) and to reach Valencia the railway had to climb even higher to cross the Coastal Range. Contemporary accounts expressed great praise for the construction, which used Krupp steel railroad ties.

The Caracas terminus was adjacent to the 3 ft (914 mm) narrow-gauge La Guaira and Caracas Railway, which operated until 1951. The Great Venezuela Railway entered the 285-metre (935 ft) Calvario tunnel for level grade to Antímano where a 2-percent climb began to a 1,227-metre (4,026 ft) summit in 267-metre (876 ft) Corozal tunnel 30 kilometres (19 mi) from Caracas. From Corozal tunnel the railway required 212 Krupp steel viaducts and 84 tunnels to cover 44 kilometres (27 mi) of gently descending grade across steep canyons to reach the fertile valley of Lake Valencia. The 106-metre (348 ft) viaduct over Agua Amarillo was the longest on the line and stood 47 metres (154 ft) above the water. The Valencia terminus was at San Blas, but the line was eventually connected to the Puerto Cabello and Valencia Railway which had its own terminus at Camoruco.

By 1922 the railway had 18 locomotives, 30 passenger cars, 68 flatcars, and 20 stock cars. Although the 4-4-4T locos could reach 70 km/h (43 mph), trains took 7 hours for the 179 km.

== Financial difficulty ==
Early in the line's history it was adversely affected by political instability in Venezuela. While the line was being built there was a revolution when president Raimundo Andueza Palacio tried to extend his term of office. Krupp computed Venezuela's debt (including damages arising from the revolution) as £1,900,000. Cipriano Castro, who seized power in 1899, suspended payments to the country´s European creditors. The European powers hoped that it would be possible to install a more amenable president, but Castro remained in power which resulted in the Venezuelan crisis of 1902–1903, a naval blockade involving gunboat diplomacy.

== Restoration projects ==
=== El Encanto ===
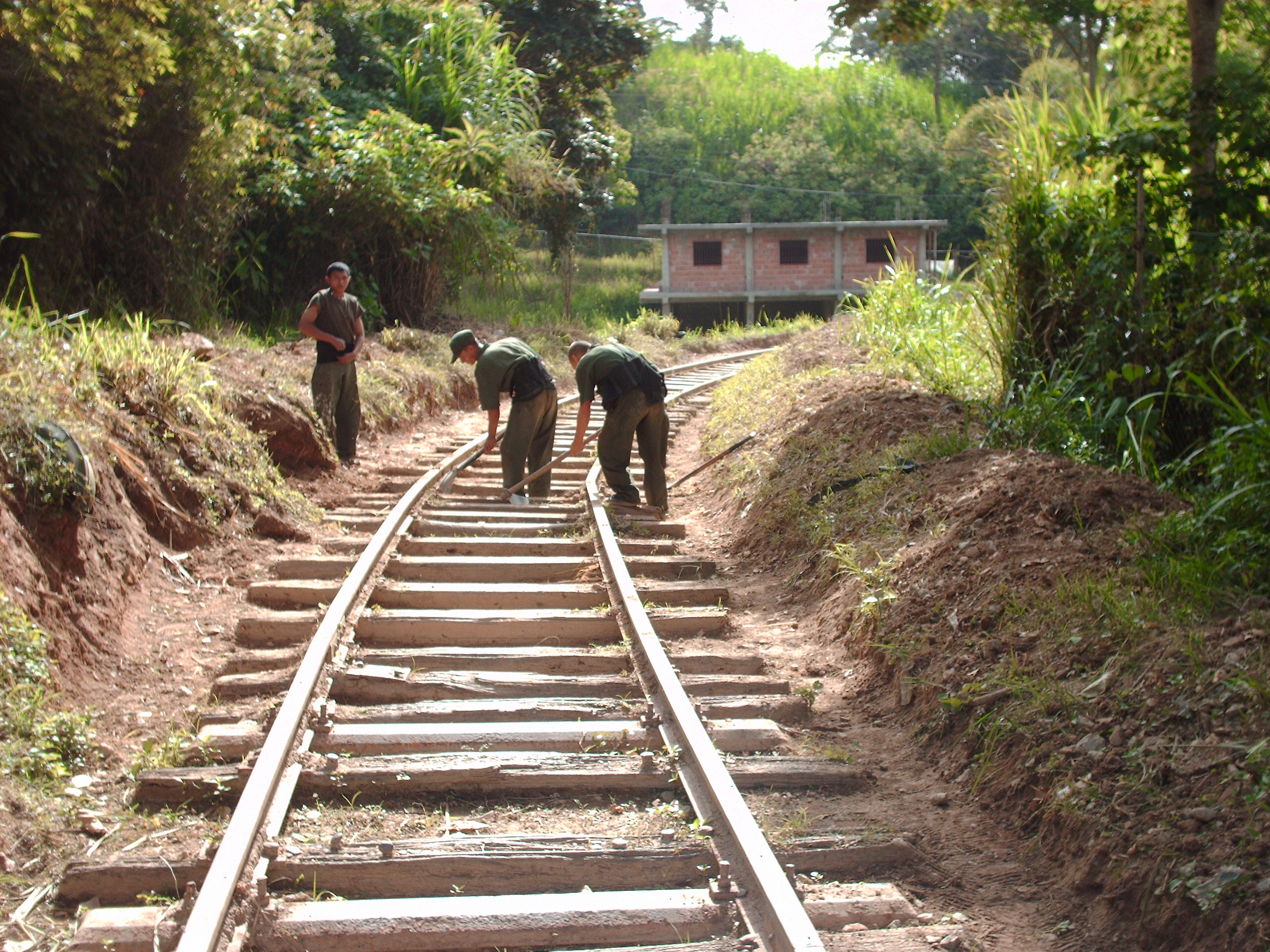

The summit section of the railway forms part of a recreation park called Parque El Encanto near Los Teques. (El Encanto is also the name of one of the stations). In the 21st century the government released funds to restore 7 km (4.3 mi) of track as a heritage railway. It was anticipated that this section with 7 tunnels and 5 bridges would provide visitors with a 25-minute journey from Los Lagos to El Encanto. However, it was reported in 2025 that, although some work had been done on the track, the restoration project had not been completed.

=== El Consejo ===
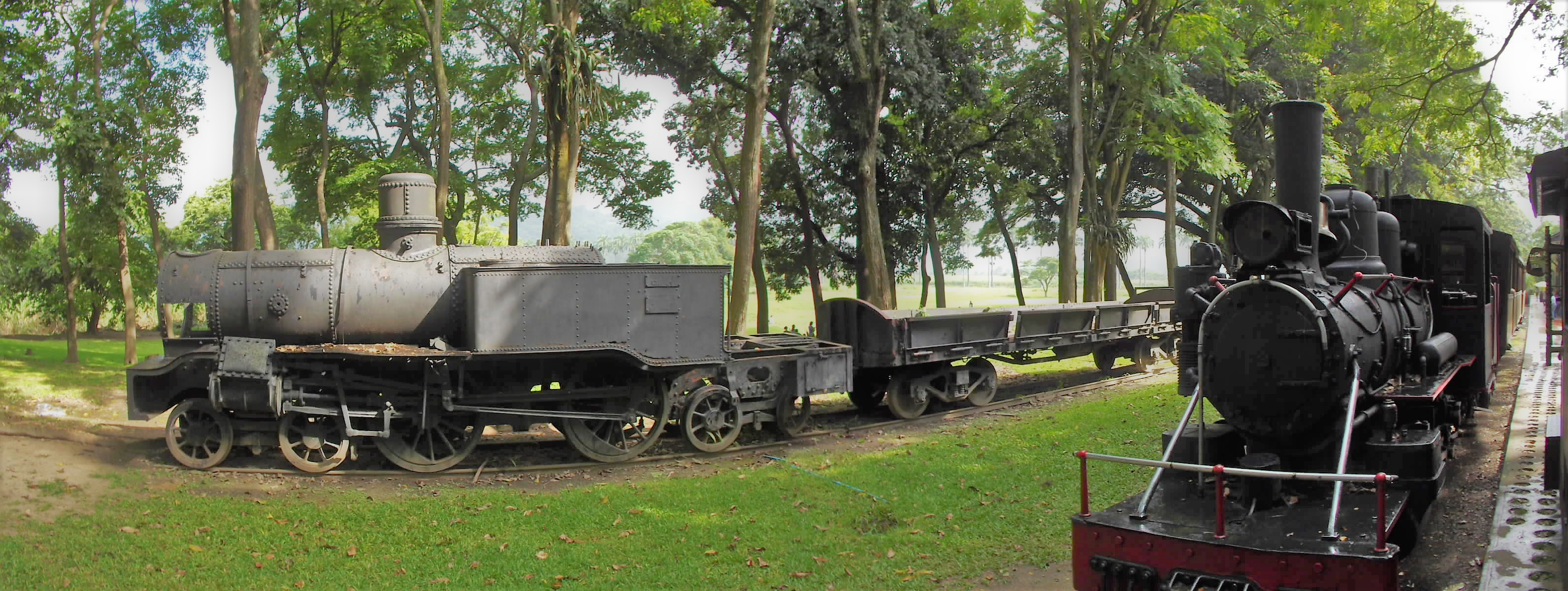
El Consejo

Remains of the railway have also been conserved further west at El Consejo, Aragua state.

== See also ==
- Rail transport in Venezuela
