= La Guaira and Caracas Railway =

The La Guaira to Caracas Railway was a narrow-gauge railway in Venezuela. From 1883 to 1951 it linked Caracas, the capital of Venezuela, to its port La Guaira. Caracas is only 7 mi (11 km) from the Caribbean. However, the city is at an altitude of 3,000 feet (910 metres), so the line extended to 23 mi (37 km) to mitigate the gradients. To help with the mountainous terrain, the line used a narrow gauge of 3 ft (914 mm) (even smaller than the 3 ft 6 in (1,067 mm) Great Venezuela Railway), along with 8 tunnels running through them.

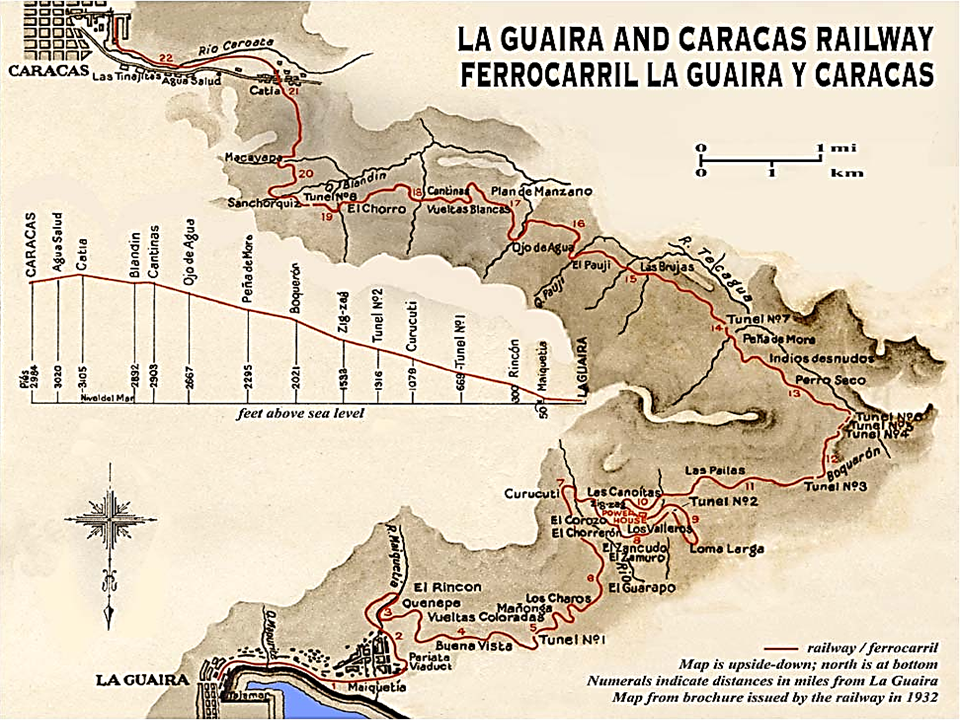

== History of the line ==
A rail route was surveyed by the British engineer Robert Stephenson as early as 1824. At the time Venezuela was part of the newly-independent Gran Colombia, which included the present-day countries of Venezuela, Colombia and Ecuador. The main reason for Stephenson being in South America was to develop mines in Colombia, but he landed at La Guaira where, before moving on to Colombia, he assessed various projects on behalf of potential investors.

A railway offered an easier way to move goods to the Venezuelan capital and to export the country's agricultural produce, Stephenson and his father had set up a company in England to build steam locomotives. However, the locomotives of the 1820s would not have coped with the climb to Caracas, and he proposed that the trains should be pulled by animals ("blood traction"). It was decided not to proceed with the project, apparently for economic reasons. However, interest revived in the following decades. The route was re-surveyed. In 1880, during the second presidency of Antonio Guzmán Blanco, the Venezuelan Government authorised a British company to construct and operate the railway.

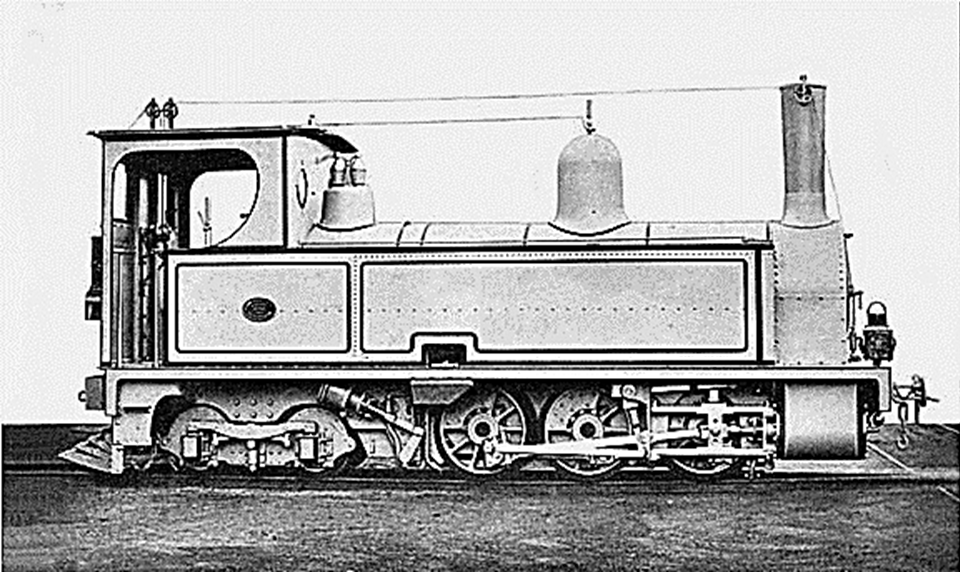
One of the original steam locomotives used on the line

The technology, including six steam locomotives made by Nasmyth, Wilson & Co. of Manchester, mainly came from England. There was no industrialised iron production in Venezuela. The Venezuelan engineer Jesús Muñoz Tébar reported:

I think it necessary to advise the same company commissioned with those works, of the convenience of bringing with them at least two workmen from the ironworks sector to assemble them and to bring the necessary tools and spare parts for those important parts that break or damage easily and which are impossible to manufacture in the country.

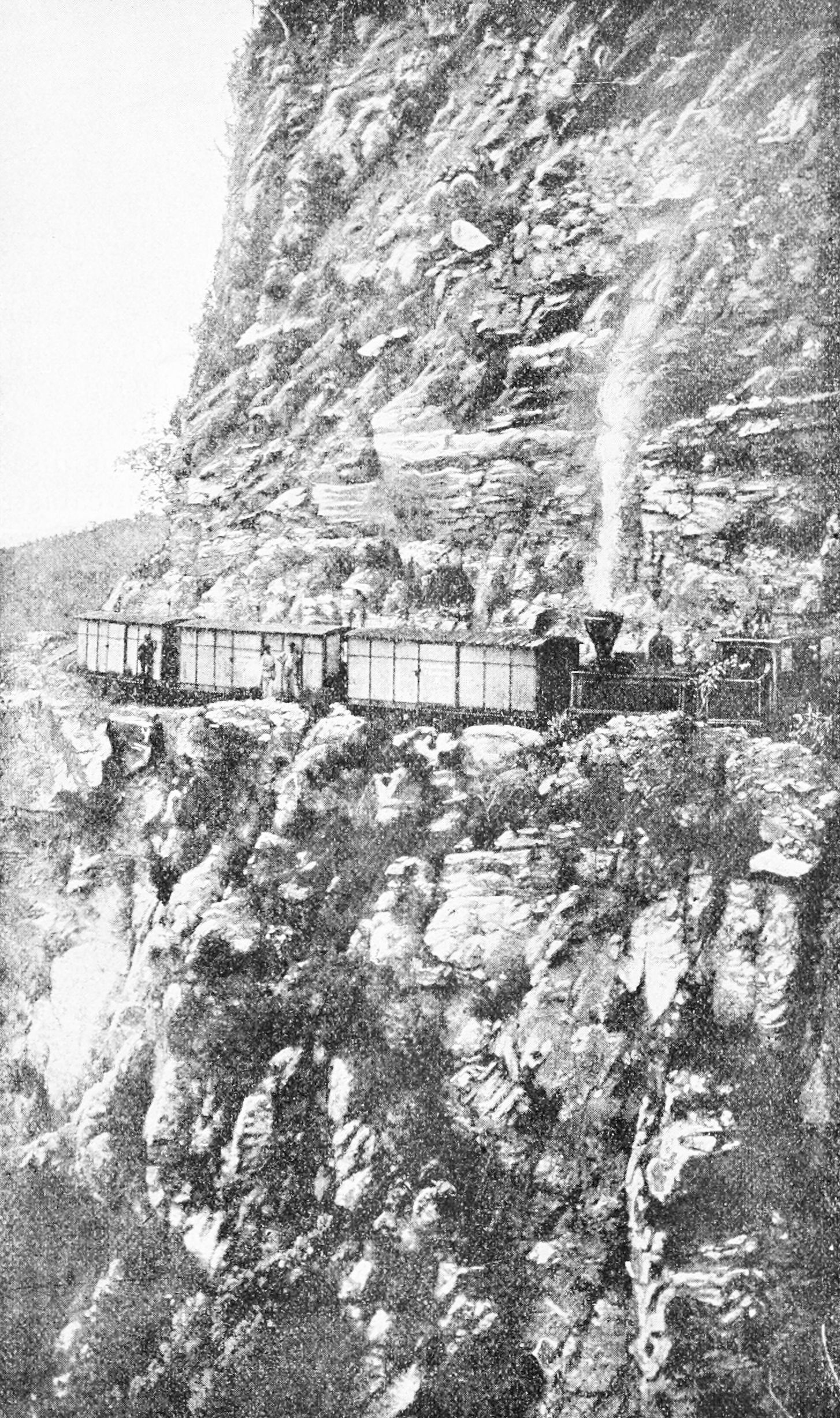
Scene on the railway

The line opened in 1883. The opening was presented as one of the events celebrating the centenary of the birth of Simón Bolívar.

The profitability of Venezuelan railways was affected by the unstable political situation in the country at the end of the 19th century. However, LG&C seems to have suffered less than the Puerto Cabello and Valencia Railway and the Great Venezuela Railway.

=== Electrification ===
In 1926 LG&C decided to electrify the line and work began the following year, resulting in a speedier service. A power plant was built at Zigzag station ten miles from La Guaira.

=== Closure ===
In the 1950s the Venezuelan government gave priority to road transport. It spent large sums on the construction of the Caracas-La Guaira highway which began in 1950. Storms damaged the railway line in 1951 and it never reopened.
