= Francisco de Miranda station (Valencia) =

Valencia metro station

Coordinates: 10.2013°N 68.0066°W

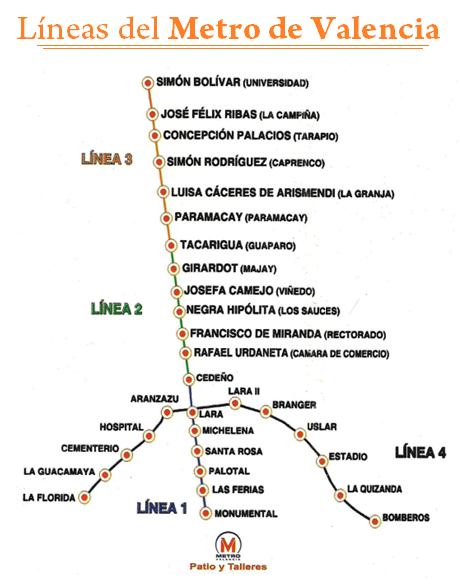

Francisco de Miranda station (Spanish: Estación Francisco de Miranda), also known as Rectorado station, is one of the stations of the Valencia Metro in Venezuela.

== History ==
The system opened in 2006, but Miranda Station was not among the original stations. It was one of two stations inaugurated in April 2015 by Nicolás Maduro, the President of Venezuela. It was named after Francisco de Miranda, the Venezuelan revolutionary. The alternative name "Rectorado" refers to a nearby building used by the University of Carabobo.
