= Naguanagua Municipality =

Naguanagua Municipality Municipio Naguanagua
- Municipality
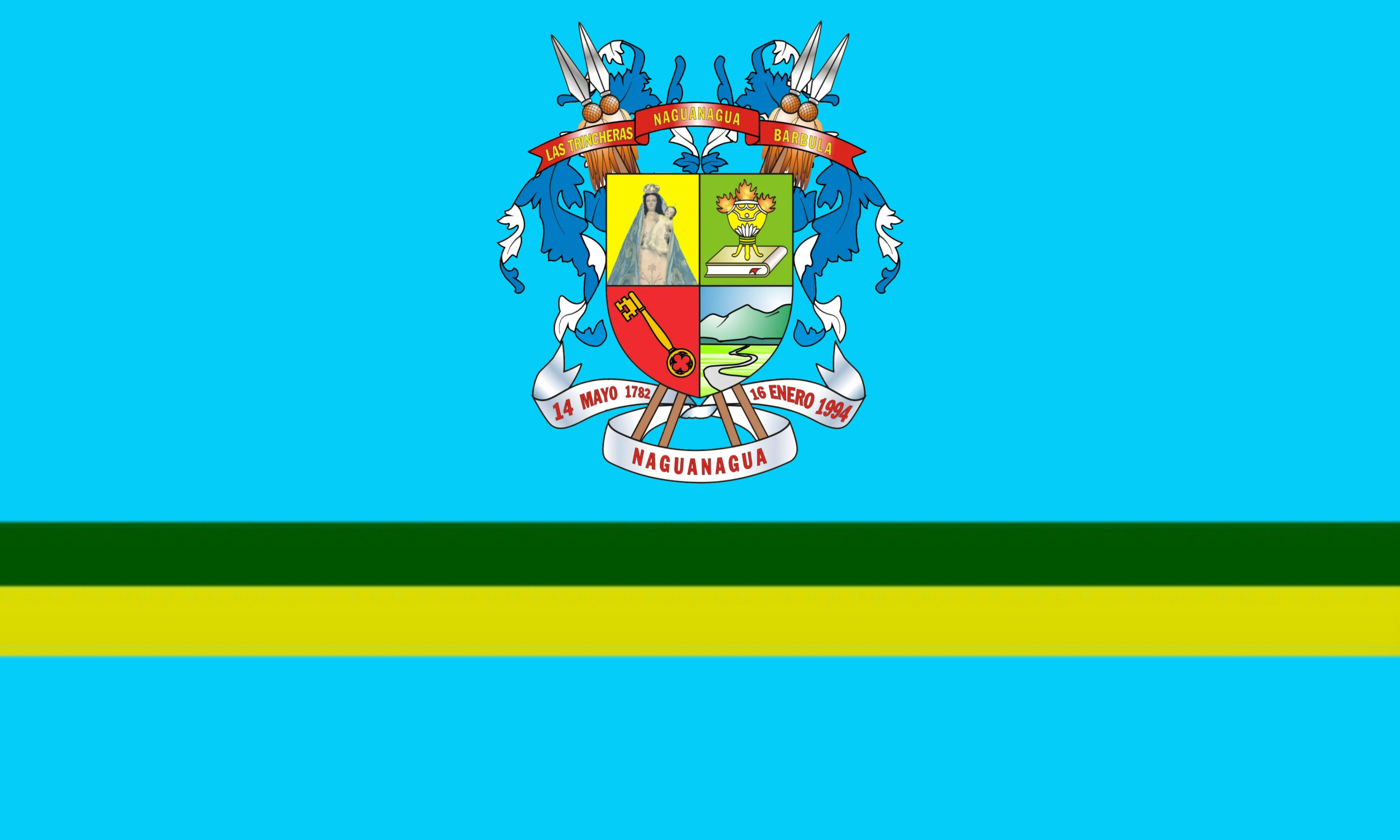
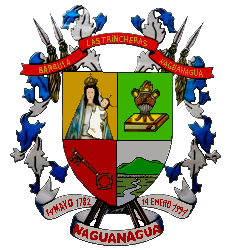
- Flag Coat of arms

- Location in Carabobo

- Location in Venezuela
- Coordinates: 10°17′37″N 68°03′37″W
- Country: Venezuela
- State: Carabobo
- Founded: May 14, 1782
- Municipal seat: Naguanagua

Government
  - Mayor: Elizabeth Niño Arteaga (PSUV)

Area
  - Total: 168.2 km^{2} (64.9 sq mi)
- Elevation: 497 m (1,631 ft)

Population (2011)
  - Total: 157,437
  - Density: 936.0/km^{2} (2,424/sq mi)
- Time zone: UTC−4 (VET)
- Area code(s): 0241

The Naguanagua (Spanish pronunciation: [naɣwaˈnaɣwa]) municipality is one of the 14 municipalities (municipios) that makes up the Venezuelan state of Carabobo and, according to the 2011 census by the National Institute of Statistics of Venezuela, the municipality has a population of 157,437. The town of Naguanagua is the shire town of the Naguanagua Municipality. It forms part of the greater Valencia Metropolitan Area in Venezuela. It is in the valley of the Cabriales River at the base of Cerro El Café and the El Trigal Mountain. Valencia and Naguanagua form a continuous urban area. The highway that runs from the centre of Valencia towards Puerto Cabello passes through this community; Bolivar Avenue in Valencia becomes University Avenue in Naguanagua on the northern side of a traffic roundabout, or redoma.

== Demographics ==
The Naguanagua County, according to a 2007 population estimate by the National Institute of Statistics of Venezuela, has a population of 143,315 (up from 134,728 in 2000). This amounts to 6.4% of the state's population. The municipality's population density is 762.31 inhabitants per square kilometre (1,974.4/sq mi).

== Government ==
The mayor of the Naguanagua County is Alejandro Feo la Cruz, elected on November 23, 2008, with 45% of the vote. He replaced Julio Castillo shortly after the elections. The municipality is divided into one parish (Naguanagua). From 2000 to 2008 Julio Rafael Castillo Sagarzazu served as the mayor of the city.

== History ==
Prior to the arrival of the Spanish in 1547, the area was inhabited by the Arawak people. The name Naguanagua is a derivation of the name of the chief who ruled the settlement and the surrounding region, Nagoanagoa. In 1553, the encomienda grant for the area was awarded to Pedro Álvarez, the Mayor of Borburata. Naguanagua was granted its own parish on 14 May 1782 by the Bishop of Caracas Don Mariano Martí.

== Tourism and places of interest ==
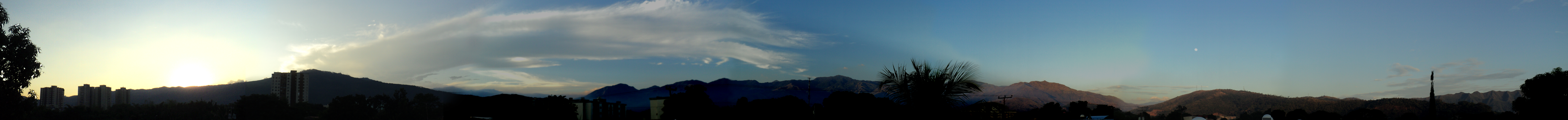
Panoramic photo of an afternoon in Naguanagua

Downtown Naguanagua features the Parochial Church of Naguanagua, the Parochial House and Bolívar Square. Near the Carabobo Hospital is the Spaniards Road (Camino de Los Españoles), Colonial Way at the San Esteban National Park (Parque Nacional San Esteban), where one can to go down to San Esteban town near to Puerto Cabello. Also, you can visit La Entrada, a village near Naguanagua where there is the Atanasio Girardot Monument. Between the Sport Square are the "Don Bosco Field" (Campo Don Bosco) in the downtown, the "Simón Bolívar Bicentennial Sport Complex" in La Granja, the "Patinodrome of Capremco" and the "University City Sport Complex" in the Campus Bárbula. Naguanagua has the largest shopping centres Carabobo State including Sambil Centre in Ciudad Jardín Mañongo, La Granja Shopping Centre, Cristal Naguanagua Centre in Las Quintas III Stage and Vía Veneto Shopping Center in Ciudad Jardín Mañongo. Other places include the offices of El Carabobeño newspaper on University Avenue, Los Guayabitos Park, the Botanical Garden of Naguanagua (Salvador Feo La Cruz Avenue), Paseo La Granja Park (Venezuela Avenue), Liberty Park or the Peace Park (Liberty Corner, 10th Street Avenue of Las Quintas, La Granja), Park of Attractions "Dunas" near the first World Trade Centre of Venezuela, "Hesperia Río Convention Center" (Mañongo Road, Mañongo), and the Park of Attractions "Ditto Park" (Tazajal).

== Universities ==
A View Near FACES at the Universidad de Carabobo

Naguanagua is the home of the main student campus of the University of Carabobo (Spanish:Universidad de Carabobo (UC)). The administrative offices are in Valencia proper. The campus is quite large and operates as a separate community with its own security, transportation, and legislative body. Also, there are other universities such as University College of Administration and Trade (Colegio Universitario de Administración y Mercadeo CUAM) near Bárbula Bridge, the National "Open" University (Universidad Nacional Abierta UNA) in El Retobo, the National Polytechnic Research University of the Armed Forces (Universidad Nacional Experimental Politécnica de las Fuerzas Armadas UNEFA) in Las Quintas I stage, and the Bicentennial University of Aragua (Universidad Bicentenaria de Aragua UBA) in La Campiña.

== Transport ==
=== Roads ===
Road transportation inside the city is provided by the Centre Regional Highway (Autopista Regional del Centro (ARC) and major arterials such as University Avenue, Salvador Feo La Cruz (North - South) Avenue(old Cemetery Avenue), Valencia Avenue, Naguanagua's Bolívar Avenue, Salvador Feo La Cruz (Easth-West) Avenue, 190 Avenue, Salvador Allende Avenue (University City Campus Bárbula Universidad de Carabobo).

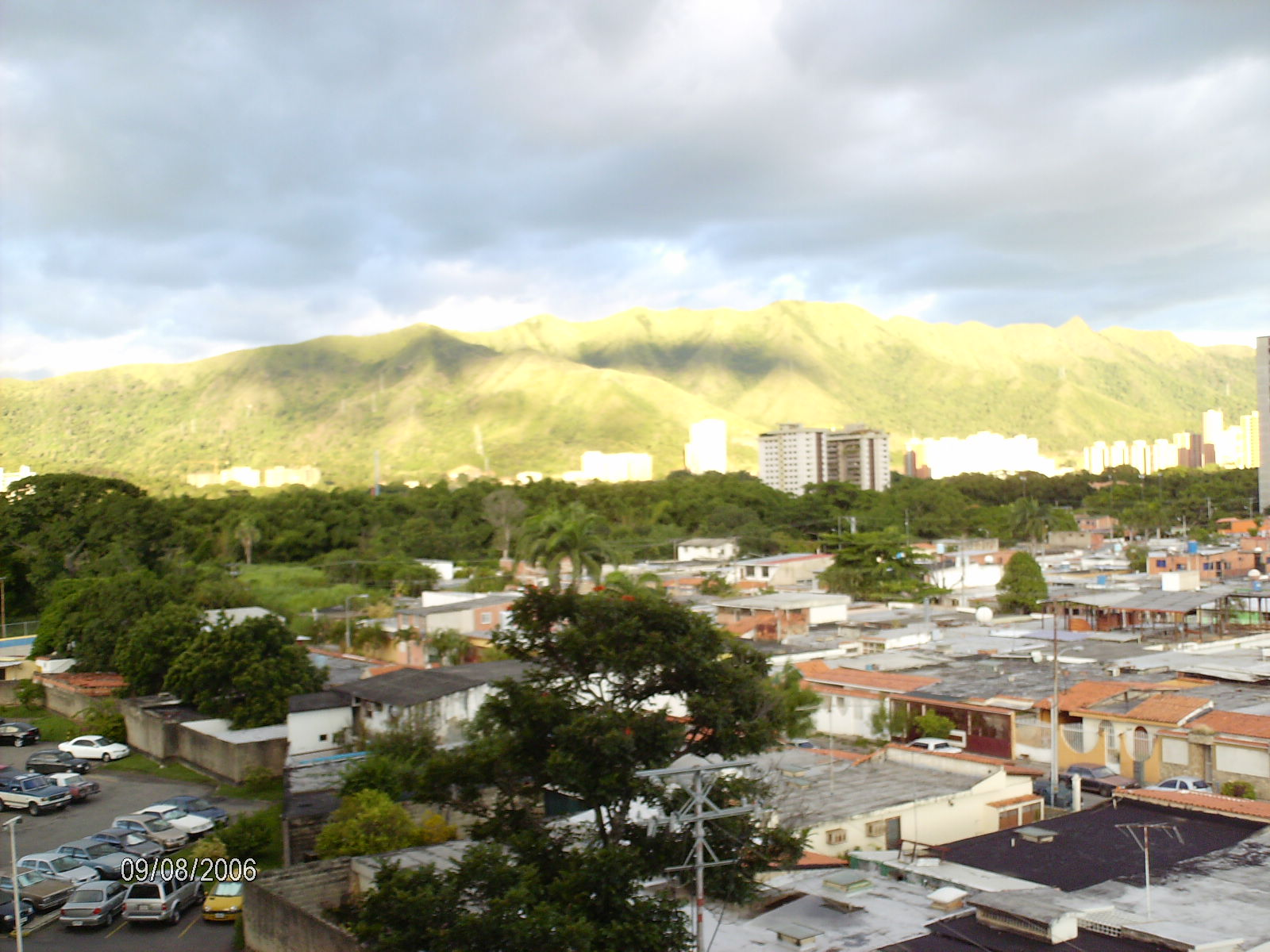
View El Trigal Mountain, Neighborhoods: Las Quintas I, El Rincón, Tazajal, Palma Real and Ciudad Jardín Mañongo, from the Southeast of the city

=== Rail ===
The Puerto Cabello and Valencia Railway closed in the 1950s. A new railway is being constructed from Puerto Cabello to La Encrucijada. One of the stations will be in Naguanagua municipality, and it is planned that there will be an interchange connecting the national rail system with the Valencia Metro.

In 2016 work on the Puerto Cabello railway was described as "irregular and marked by slow payments by the client as a result of the country’s poor economic conditions, mainly related to the drop in the price of oil."

== Neighborhoods ==
190 | Agua Linda | Arturo Ramírez | Av. 181 Valencia | Barrio Unión | Barrio Oeste | Bella Vista | Brisas de Carabobo | Brisas del Café | Campus Bárbula - Ciudad Universitaria - | Caprenco | Carialinda | Chaguaramal | Ciudad Jardín Mañongo | Centro Histórico de Naguanagua | Colinas de Girardot I | Colinas de Girardot II | Colón | Democracia | El Cafetal | El Naranjal I | El Naranjal II | El Pinar | El Piñal | El Retobo | El Rincón | Guayabal | Guaparo Naguanagüense | Güere | Gonzalez Plaza | La Begoña | La Campiña I | La Campiña II | La Campiña III | La Cidra | La Florida | La Granja I | La Granja II | La Llovizna | La Luz | La Querencia | La Sabana | La Coromoto | Las Palmeras | Las Quintas I | Las Quintas II | Las Quintas III (Quintas del Norte) | Lorenzo Fernández | Los Candiles | Los Caracaros | Los Guayabitos | Malagón | Mañongo | Monte Sión | Negra Matea | Nueva Esparta | Palma Real | Parque Naguanagua | Puente Bárbula | Rotafé | Santa Ana | Santa Eduviges (Vivienda Rural Bárbula) | Santa Marta | Tarapio | Tazajal | Terrazas de Naguanagua | Terrazas de Paramacay | Valle Verde
