= Urdaneta Municipality, Miranda =

Urdaneta Municipality Municipio Urdaneta
- Municipality
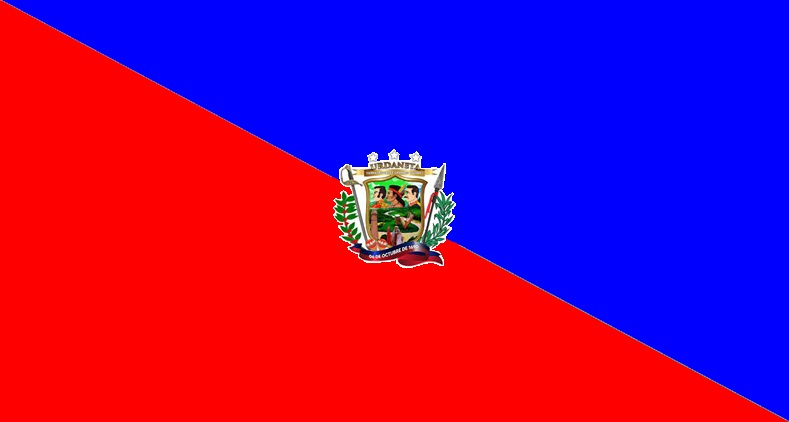
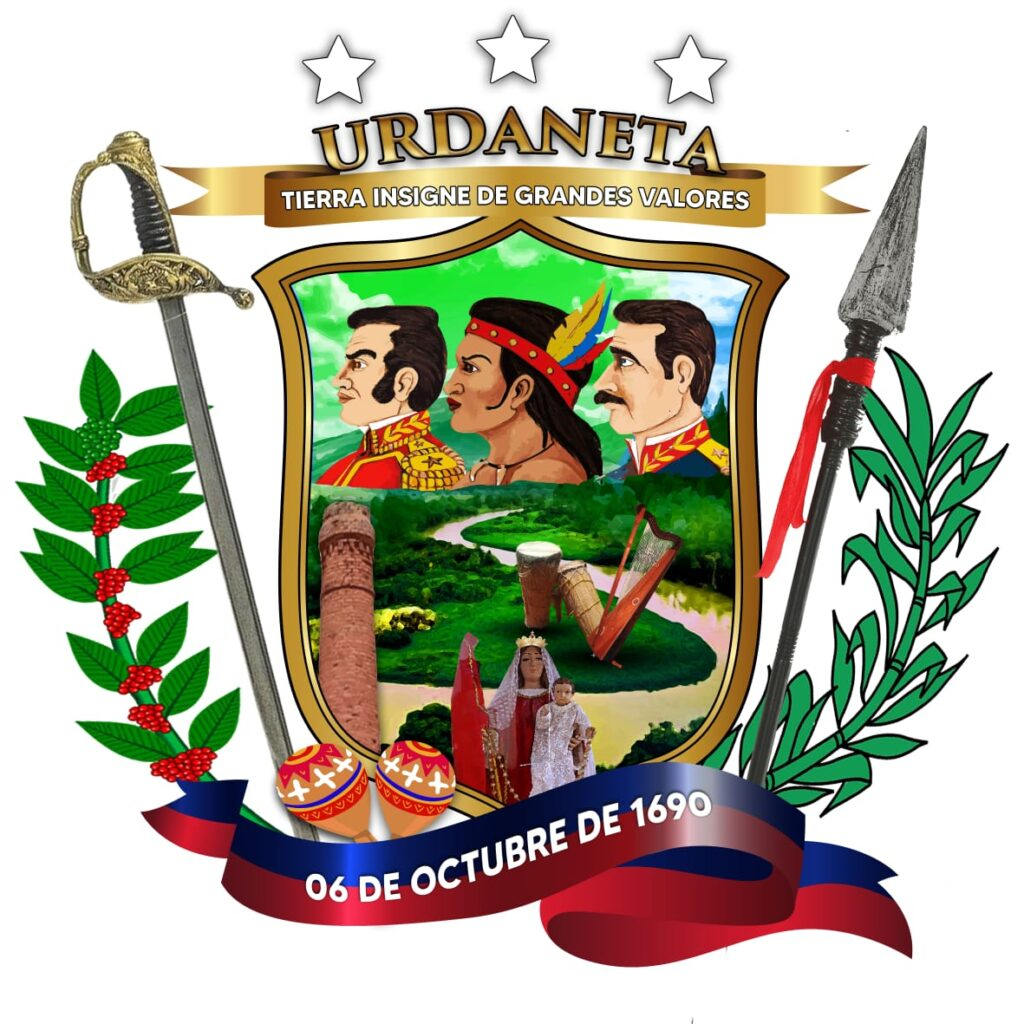
- Flag Coat of arms

- Location in Miranda

- Location in Venezuela
- Coordinates: 10°07′30″N 66°54′53″W
- Country: Venezuela
- State: Miranda
- Municipal seat: Cúa

Government
  - Mayor: Edicson Sarmiento (PSUV)

Area
  - Total: 298.9 km^{2} (115.4 sq mi)

Population (2016)
  - Total: 167,768
  - Density: 561.3/km^{2} (1,454/sq mi)
- Time zone: UTC−4 (VET)
- Area code(s): 0239
- Website: Official website

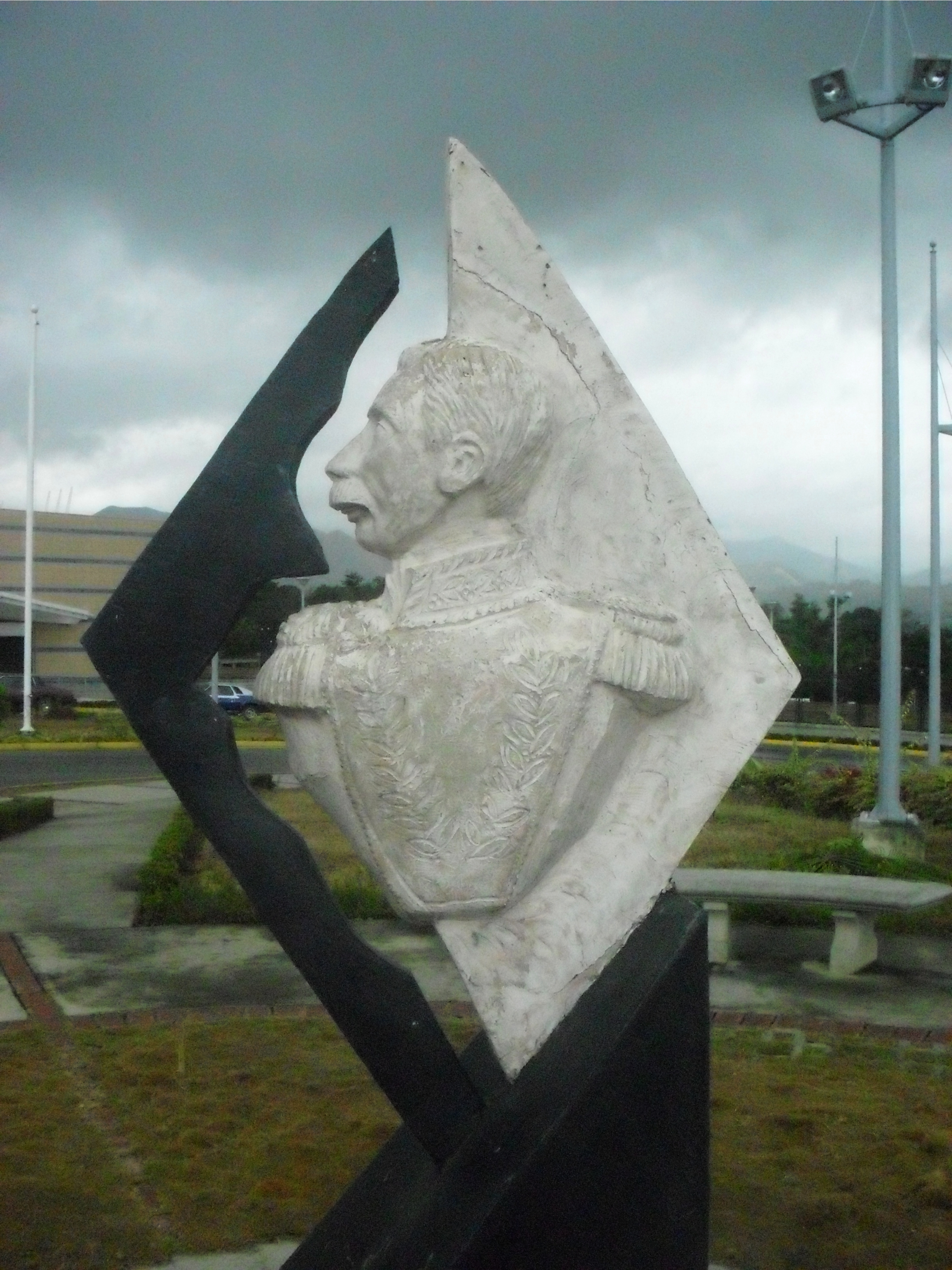
Sculpture of General Ezequiel Zamora located in the Cúa rail station.

Urdaneta is one of the 21 municipalities (municipios) that makes up the Venezuelan state of Miranda and, according to a 2016 population estimate by the National Institute of Statistics of Venezuela, the municipality has a population of 167,768. The town of Cúa is the municipal seat of the Urdaneta Municipality. The municipality is one of several in Venezuela named "Urdaneta Municipality" in honour of Venezuelan independence hero Rafael Urdaneta.

== History ==
The first establishments of Cúa dates from the pre-Columbian period, being the first founders the Quiriquires natives, has like nickname The Tuy Pearl, because its location at the borders of the Tuy River. After the officially foundation on October 6, 1690 by fray Manuel de Alesson, under the invocation of Our Lady of the Rosary of Cúa, the first inhabitants came from different regions motivated by the agriculture, due to the fertility and strategic location of the valley. However, this town was founded initially at the site known like Marín in 1633, this first village was destroyed in its totality by a violent earthquake that affected a great part of the Tuy Valleys.

The name of Cúa, according to some historians, has it origin from the Cumanagotos natives, from the Carib language that means Crab, meaning that Cúa is the place where the crab abounds. Others affirm that its name is associate with Apacuana, a brave native woman from the region, that fought against the Spaniards. Others think that that name was giving in honor to the native Cue, ally of the Spaniards, that helped in the foundation and consolidation of the town.

== Demographics ==
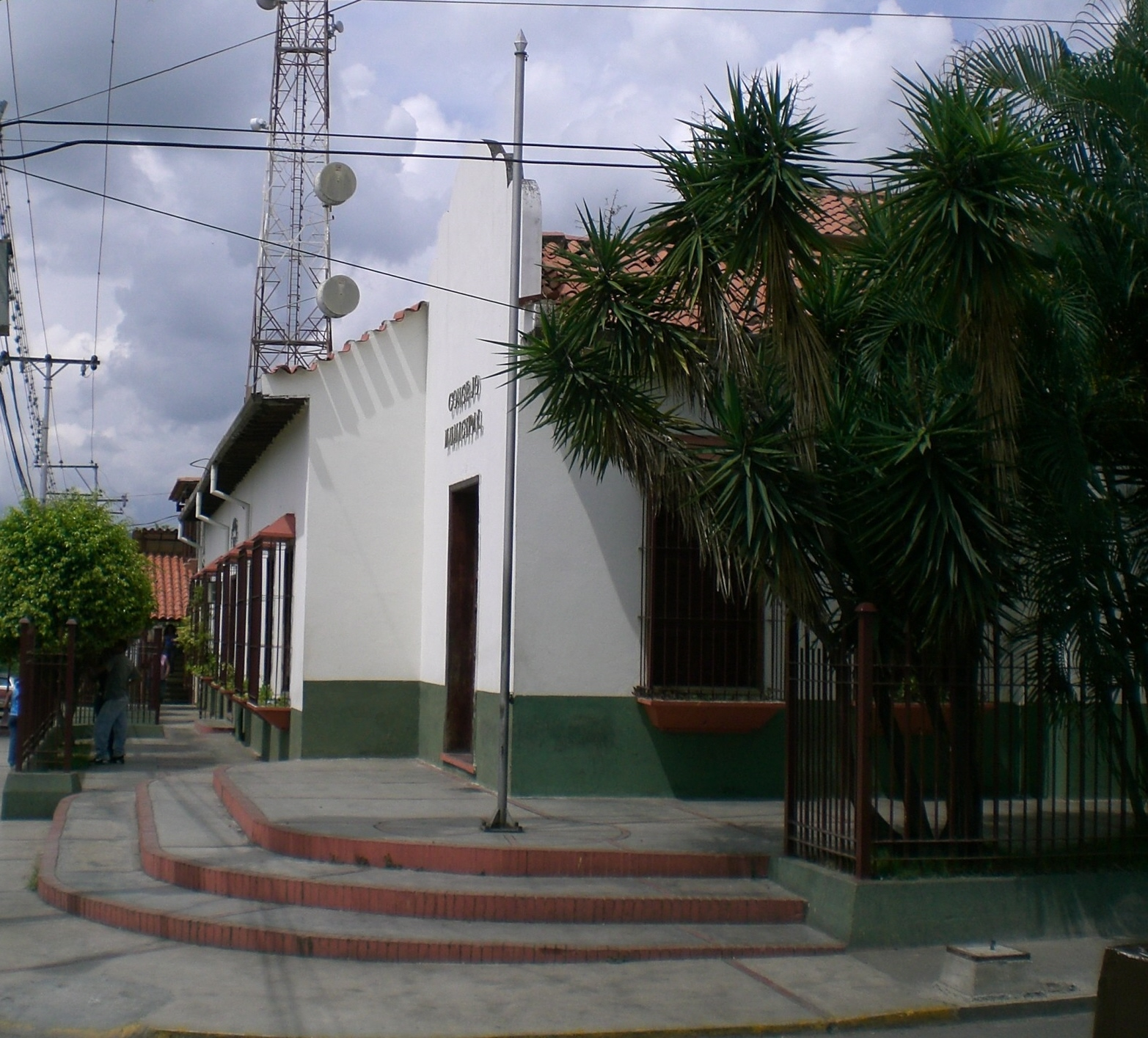
Cúa Municipal Council

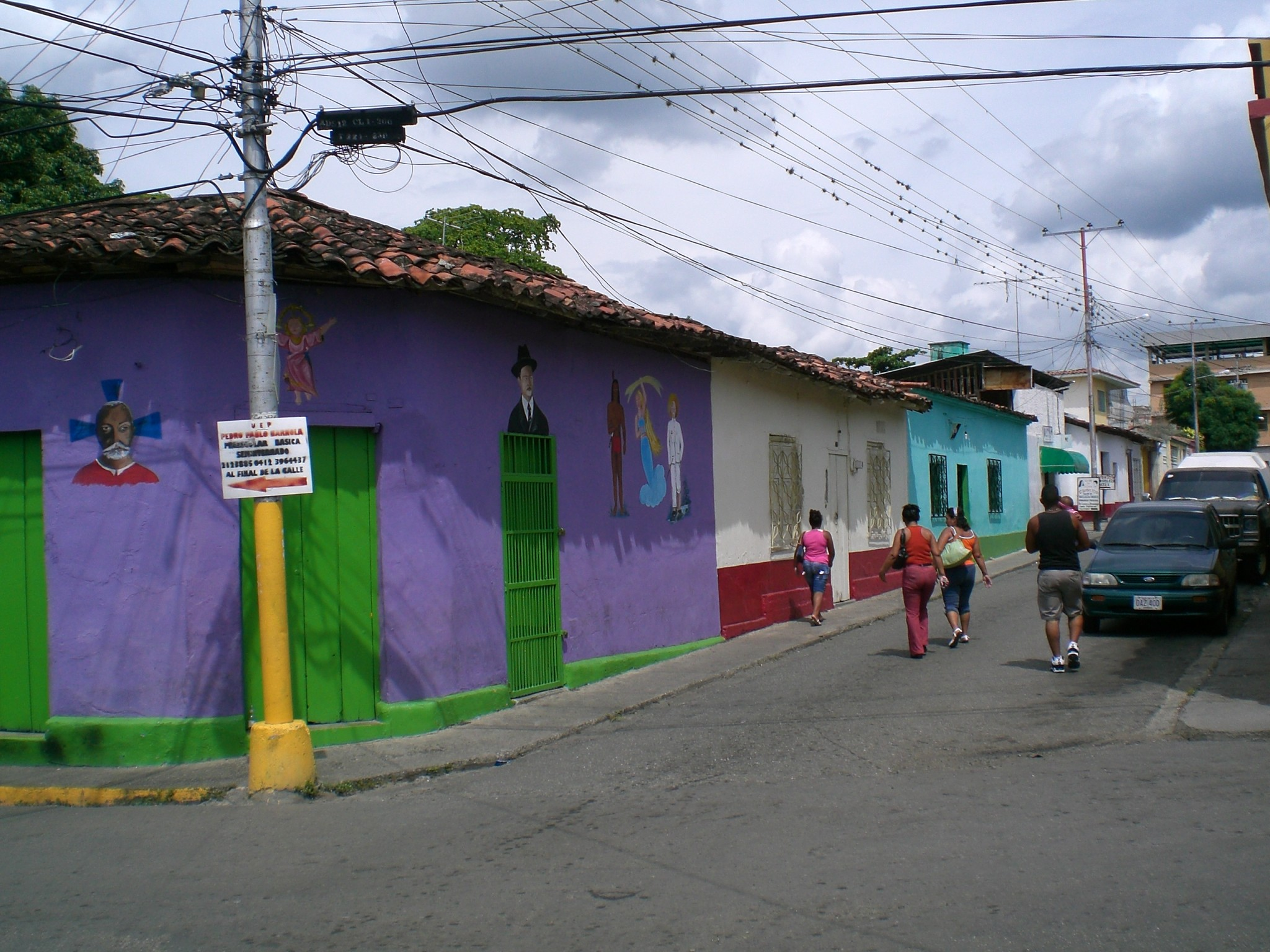
Typical street of the town

The Urdaneta Municipality, according to a 2016 population estimate by the National Institute of Statistics of Venezuela, has a population of 167,768 (up from 114,221 in 2000). This amounts to 4.6% of the state's population. The municipality's population density is 478.54 inhabitants per square kilometre (1,239.4/sq mi).

== Government ==
The mayor of the Urdaneta Municipality is Jorge H. Castro, re-elected on October 31, 2004 with 42% of the vote. The municipality is divided into Cúa parishes; Cúa and Nueva Cúa.

== Transportation ==
- Buses are the main means of mass transportation, operated by several companies on normal streets and avenues:
  - bus; large buses.
  - buseta; medium size buses.
  - microbus or colectivo; vans or minivans.
- IAFE; train services to and from Caracas and Charallave.

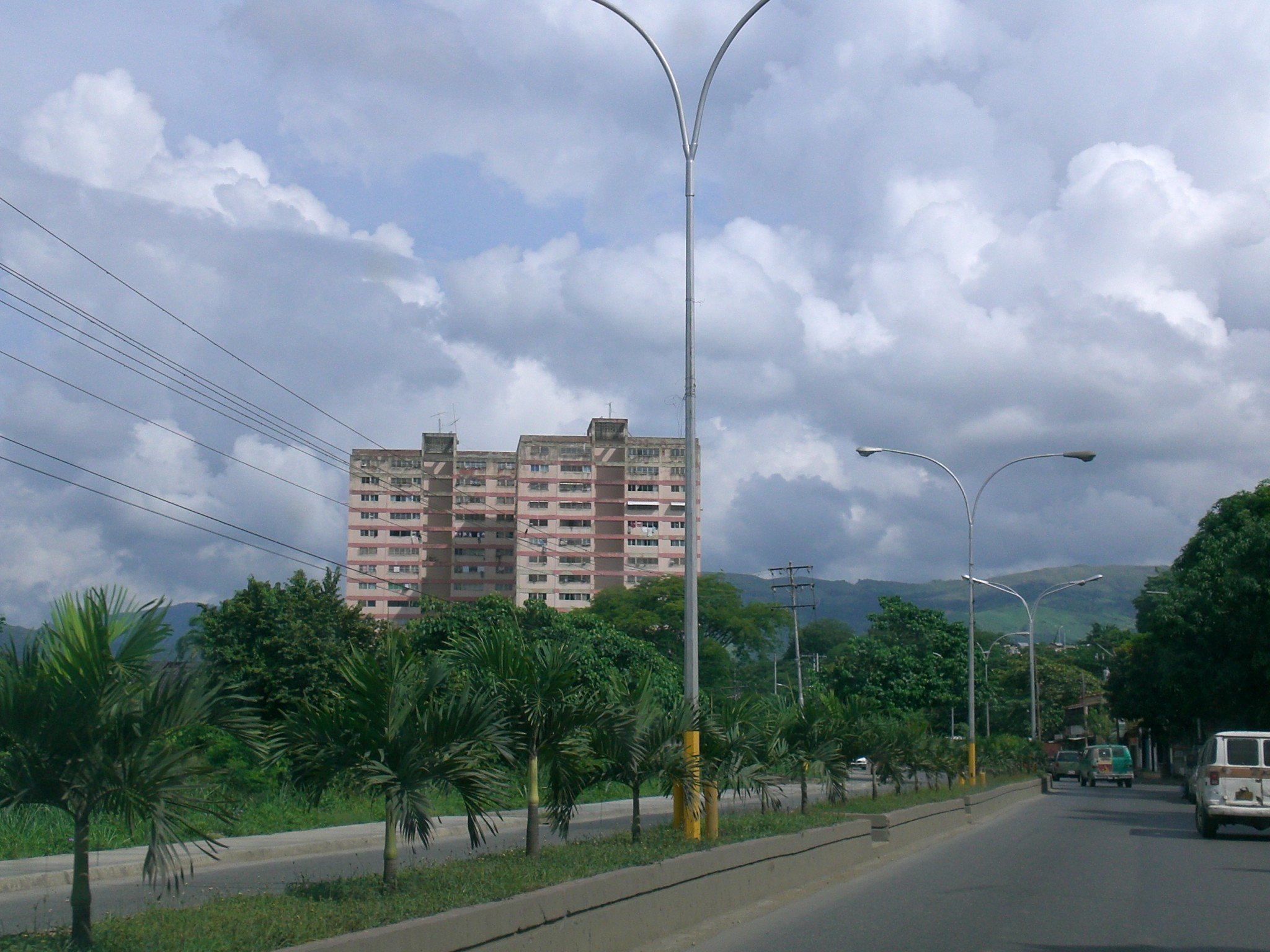
Perimetral Avenue

=== Main avenues ===
- Perimetral avenue
- Monseñor Pellín avenue
- José María Carreño street
- El Rosario street
- El Carmen street
- Lecumberry street
- San Rafael street
- Juan España street
- Zamora street

== Notable natives ==
- José María Carreño
- Evencio Castellanos
- María Teresa Castillo
- Baudilio Díaz
- Pancho Prin
- Victor Guillermo Ramos Rangel
- Cristóbal Rojas
- Ezequiel Zamora
