= Libertador Simón Bolívar Terminal =

Railway station in Caracas, Venezuela

Estación Caracas "Libertador Simón Bolívar"
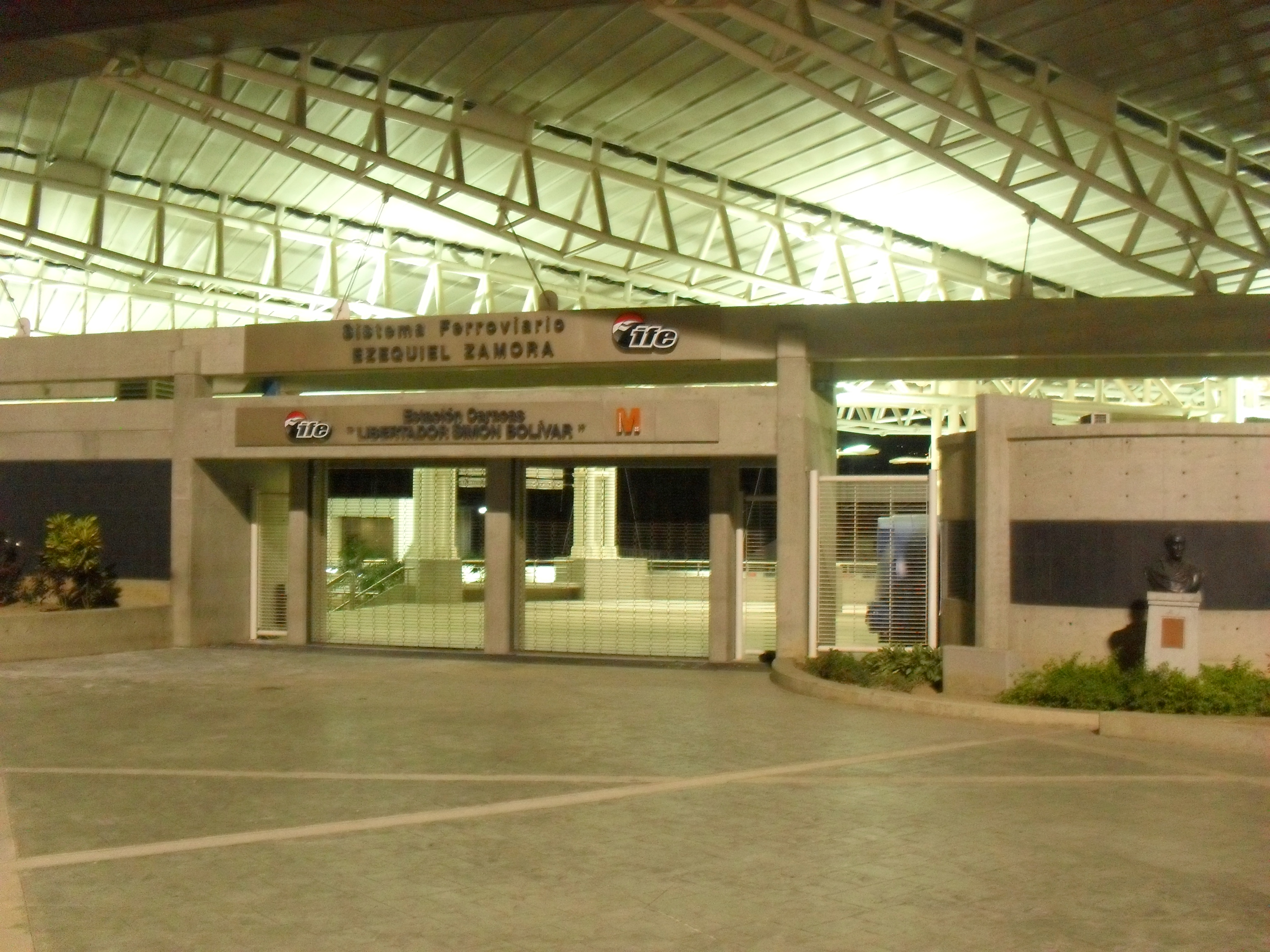

General information
- Location: La Rinconada, Caracas, Venezuela
- Coordinates: 10°26′04″N 66°56′14″W
- Owner: Instituto de Ferrocarriles del Estado

History
- Opened: 15 October 2006
Location

Caracas Libertador Simón Bolívar railway station is found in the southern part of Caracas, Venezuela, in an area known as La Rinconada.

== History ==
The train station and the associated La Rinconada metro station came into service on October 15, 2006.

== Overview ==
In the twenty years since it opened, Libertador Simón Bolívar has served as the only point of arrival or departure by train to or from Caracas. The station is the Caracas terminus of the line Ezequiel Zamora I which connects the Tuy valley to the capital. Short-distance trains run on the line, connecting Caracas with the suburban towns of:

- Charallave (2 stations)
  - the North one Generalísmo Francisco de Miranda
  - the South one Don Simón Rodríguez
- Cúa (1 station) about 30 minutes

Those arriving from the Tuy valley can easily transfer from the railway station to La Rinconada Caracas Metro station.

In the long term it is planned that there should be a long-distance train service linking Charallave to La Encrucijada in Aragua state.
