= State Railways Institution =

State-owned railway company of Venezuela

Venezuela railways: planned mainly unbuilt sections of the railway network before 1999

The State Railways Institution (Spanish: Instituto de Ferrocarriles del Estado, or IFE) is a state-run organization of Venezuela that manages the railway systems of the country. Its headquarters are located in Caracas, Venezuela.

According to the 1999 Constitution, its renovation is a national priority. The new infrastructure which has been added includes the first new above-ground train line constructed in Venezuela for more than 70 years, the Ezequiel Zamora Mass Transportation System. Named after the soldier Ezequiel Zamora, it was inaugurated on October 15, 2006, by President Hugo Chávez.

== History ==
Historically, much of the original Venezuelan network was designed in the 19th century in the Federalist period and under the administration of Antonio Guzmán Blanco, in order to open up the country for trade and earn foreign revenues. However, the first licenses were signed and revoked nine times before the first stretch was operating.

Two of the first lines connected Caracas to its port of La Guaira (the La Guaira and Caracas Railway) and to Valencia (the Great Venezuela Railway) in the 1880s. Notable engineers associated with its original development include: John Grover and Robert Fairlie. Some of the later lines were designed by William A. Welch and Thomas Kavanagh (Caracas subway).

Rail transport in Venezuela was neglected and went into a major decline from the 1950s, with bus and road transport taking its place. However, Caracas opened the first line of its subway system in 1983, and plans were made for a railway system which would include lines near Caracas and also into the interior of the country. In 1975 was devised by the "Instituto Ferrocarriles del Estado" (IFE) a National Plan Ferrocarrilero that began in Maracaibo and reached Barquisimeto-Puerto Cabello-Valencia-Caracas-Cua, following from Cua to Barcelona and Ciudad Bolivar-Ciudad Guayana. The company "Saprolate-Tranarg" made all aerial photographic surveys and the Plan was approved by the then President Luis Herrera Campins, but in the 1980s the Plan IFE was blocked for economic reasons after the devaluation of the Bolivar in 1983 and then was finally canceled with the Caracazo of 1989. Only the section Caracas-Cúa was maintained as a budgeted project (and was made, being inaugurated in 2006 by President Hugo Chavez).

The 1999 constitution was a signal for a major reinvestment in the infrastructure of the state. Much of the renovation of the current Venezuelan railway network is still at the planning stage, with some already constructed and the rest to be built over a period of about 30 years.

== Railway network ==
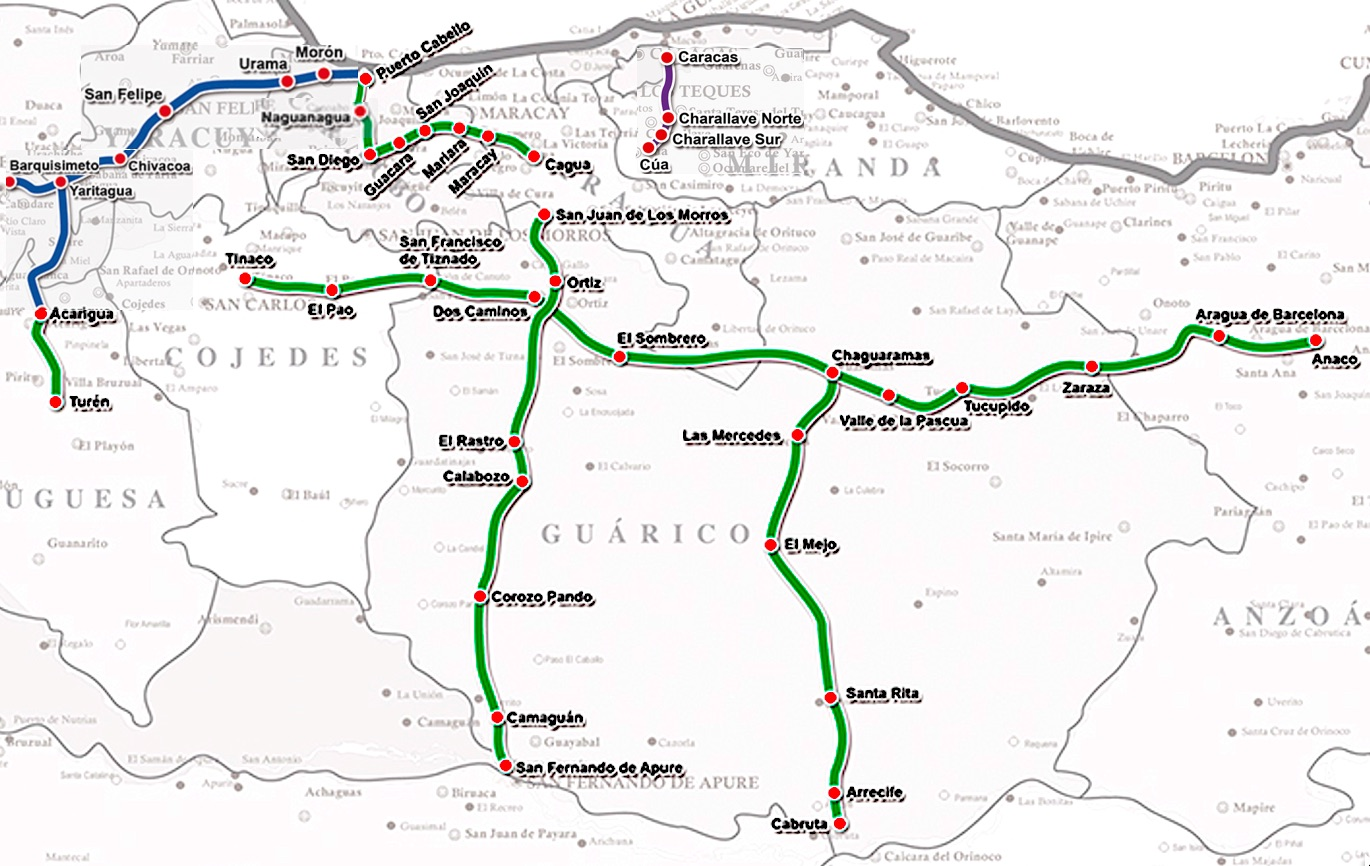
Map based on IFE maps of lines operating (purple), lines being restored (blue) and lines under construction (green) as at 2017

The Venezuelan network includes 682 km (424 mi) of rail in standard gauge. The network covers the populated and production areas in the country, and is managed by IFE under various Regional Development Plans. There are also connections between Colombia and Brazil that link to the other countries of South America, although traffic in the border areas are affected by foreign policy and defence strategy.

IFE is the sole operator of trains in Venezuela, however, they have created various railway names assigned to different regions throughout the country.

Railway	Branch	Present status	Station	Location	
Ezequiel Zamora	Capital Line Caracas – El Sombrero (approx 150 km)	Passenger service on Venezuela's first electrified train line between Caracas and Cúa (41 km) has been in operation since October 15, 2006. Although short this trip passes through 24 tunnels with the longest being just under 6.8 km	Libertador Simón Bolívar	Caracas beside the Caracas Metro La Rinconada station.	Federal District
Ezequiel Zamora	Capital Line Caracas – El Sombrero (approx 150 km)	Passenger service on Venezuela's first electrified train line between Caracas and Cúa (41 km) has been in operation since October 15, 2006. Although short this trip passes through 24 tunnels with the longest being just under 6.8 km	Generalísimo Francisco de Miranda	North Charallave	Miranda State
Ezequiel Zamora	Capital Line Caracas – El Sombrero (approx 150 km)	Passenger service on Venezuela's first electrified train line between Caracas and Cúa (41 km) has been in operation since October 15, 2006. Although short this trip passes through 24 tunnels with the longest being just under 6.8 km	Don Simón Rodríguez	South Charallave	Miranda State
Ezequiel Zamora	Capital Line Caracas – El Sombrero (approx 150 km)	Passenger service on Venezuela's first electrified train line between Caracas and Cúa (41 km) has been in operation since October 15, 2006. Although short this trip passes through 24 tunnels with the longest being just under 6.8 km	General Ezequiel Zamora	Cúa	Miranda State
Ezequiel Zamora	Capital Line Caracas – El Sombrero (approx 150 km)	Passenger service on Venezuela's first electrified train line between Caracas and Cúa (41 km) has been in operation since October 15, 2006. Although short this trip passes through 24 tunnels with the longest being just under 6.8 km		Camatagua	Aragua State
Ezequiel Zamora	Capital Line Caracas – El Sombrero (approx 150 km)	Passenger service on Venezuela's first electrified train line between Caracas and Cúa (41 km) has been in operation since October 15, 2006. Although short this trip passes through 24 tunnels with the longest being just under 6.8 km		El Sombrero	Guarico State
Ezequiel Zamora	Puerto Cabello – La Encrucijada (approx. 108 km)	Under construction and originally projected completion by before 2011 however there have been damage setbacks. After years of slow progress a small part of the line (San Diego-Guacara about 10 km) will be opened before the end of 2012. The best optimistic estimate for 100% completion was sometime before 2015. Presently 14 of 15 tunnels (accumulated 28 km in length) have been completed with hope for the last one to be finished before end of 2012. The longest built tunnel is just a smidgen under 7.8 km in length. In 2016 the, "Puerto Cabello railway project, was described as irregular and marked by slow payments by the client as a result of the country’s poor economic conditions, mainly related to the drop in the price of oil."	Puerto Cabello	Puerto Cabello	Carabobo State
Ezequiel Zamora	Puerto Cabello – La Encrucijada (approx. 108 km)		Naguanagua	Northern Valencia suburb	Carabobo State
Ezequiel Zamora	Puerto Cabello – La Encrucijada (approx. 108 km)		San Diego	North-eastern Valencia suburb	Carabobo State
Ezequiel Zamora	Puerto Cabello – La Encrucijada (approx. 108 km)		Guacara	Eastern Valencia suburb	Carabobo State
Ezequiel Zamora	Puerto Cabello – La Encrucijada (approx. 108 km)		San Joaquín	San Joaquín	Carabobo State
Ezequiel Zamora	Puerto Cabello – La Encrucijada (approx. 108 km)		Mariara	Mariara	Carabobo State
Ezequiel Zamora	Puerto Cabello – La Encrucijada (approx. 108 km)		Maracay	Maracay	Aragua State
Ezequiel Zamora	Puerto Cabello – La Encrucijada (approx. 108 km)		Cagua	Santa Crúz de Aragua with station near Cagua, La Encrucijada and Turmero	Aragua State
Ezequiel Zamora	La Encrucijada – Cúa	planning stage	La Victoria	La Victoria	Aragua State
Ezequiel Zamora	La Encrucijada – Cúa	planning stage	Las Tejerías	Las Tejerías	Aragua State
Ezequiel Zamora	La Encrucijada – San Juan de Los Morros	planning stage	Villa de Cura	Villa de Cura	Aragua State
Ezequiel Zamora	La Encrucijada – San Juan de Los Morros	planning stage	San Juan de Los Morros	San Juan de Los Morros	Guárico State
Simón Bolívar	Puerto Cabello – Barquisimeto	Trial runs between Barquisimeto and Yaritagua have been successful where passenger travel time between the 2 stations is completed in 30 minutes (34 km). Also currently freight trains run from Puerto Cabello to Barquisimeto (173 km). Since the original plans for line and station renovation and modernization projected passenger travel by the end of 2010 have faltered, after considerable delay in construction, the best hope is that full service will be available in 2013. An additional rail will be added between the Morón and Puerto Cabello Stations to serve the expected increase in rail traffic on the shared line.	Puerto Cabello	Puerto Cabello	Carabobo State
Simón Bolívar	Puerto Cabello – Barquisimeto		Morón	Western Puerto Cabello Suburb	Carabobo State
Simón Bolívar	Puerto Cabello – Barquisimeto		San Felipe	San Felipe	Yaracuy State
Simón Bolívar	Puerto Cabello – Barquisimeto		Urama	Urama	Yaracuy State
Simón Bolívar	Puerto Cabello – Barquisimeto		Chivacoa	Chivacoa	Yaracuy State
Simón Bolívar	Puerto Cabello – Barquisimeto		Yaritagua	Yaritagua	Yaracuy State
Simón Bolívar	Puerto Cabello – Barquisimeto		Barquisimeto	Barquisimeto	Lara State
Simón Bolívar	Yaritagua – Acarigua – Turén	Trial train runs have been successfully employed between Barquisimeto and Acarigua via Yaritagua and everyone awaits the inauguration for this 101 km service. The travel time between Yaritagua and Acarigua is 40 minutes. As well an additional 44+ km line extension from Acarigua to Turén should be completed before the end of 2012. Ruezga bridge in Barquisimeto is said to be planned for completion in 2017, allowing opening of the line.	Acarigua	Acarigua	Portuguesa State
Simón Bolívar	Yaritagua – Acarigua – Turén	Trial train runs have been successfully employed between Barquisimeto and Acarigua via Yaritagua and everyone awaits the inauguration for this 101 km service. The travel time between Yaritagua and Acarigua is 40 minutes. As well an additional 44+ km line extension from Acarigua to Turén should be completed before the end of 2012. Ruezga bridge in Barquisimeto is said to be planned for completion in 2017, allowing opening of the line.	Turén	Turén	Portuguesa State
Norte Occidental (North Western)	Morón – Riecito	only freight services	Morón	Morón	Carabobo State
Norte Occidental (North Western)	Morón – Riecito	only freight services	Tucacas	Tucacas	Falcón State
Norte Occidental (North Western)	Morón – Riecito	only freight services	Yaracal	Yaracal	Falcón State
Norte Occidental (North Western)	Morón – Riecito	only freight services	Riecito	Riecito	Falcón State
Norte Occidental (North Western)	Yaracal – Punto Fijo	planning stage	Coro	Coro	Falcón State
Norte Occidental (North Western)	Yaracal – Punto Fijo	planning stage	Punto Fijo	Punto Fijo	Falcón State
Norte Llanero (Northern Plains)	Maturín – Anaco	planning stage	Maturín	Maturín	Monagas State
Norte Llanero (Northern Plains)	Maturín – Anaco	planning stage	Anaco	Anaco	Anzoátegui State
Norte Llanero (Northern Plains)	Anaco – Tinaco	This 468 km line is under construction for over 3 years, and expected completion by year-end 2012 has amounted to just less than 25% line completion. So far the construction rate on 5 different work fronts has been slow or even delayed.	Aragua de Barcelona	Anaco	Anzoátegui State
Norte Llanero (Northern Plains)	Anaco – Tinaco	This 468 km line is under construction for over 3 years, and expected completion by year-end 2012 has amounted to just less than 25% line completion. So far the construction rate on 5 different work fronts has been slow or even delayed.	Zaraza	Zaraza	Guárico State
Norte Llanero (Northern Plains)	Anaco – Tinaco	This 468 km line is under construction for over 3 years, and expected completion by year-end 2012 has amounted to just less than 25% line completion. So far the construction rate on 5 different work fronts has been slow or even delayed.	Tucupito	Tucupito	Guárico State
Norte Llanero (Northern Plains)	Anaco – Tinaco	This 468 km line is under construction for over 3 years, and expected completion by year-end 2012 has amounted to just less than 25% line completion. So far the construction rate on 5 different work fronts has been slow or even delayed.	Valle de la Pascua	Valle de la Pascua	Guárico State
Norte Llanero (Northern Plains)	Anaco – Tinaco	This 468 km line is under construction for over 3 years, and expected completion by year-end 2012 has amounted to just less than 25% line completion. So far the construction rate on 5 different work fronts has been slow or even delayed.	Chaguaramos	Chaguaramos	Guárico State
Norte Llanero (Northern Plains)	Anaco – Tinaco	This 468 km line is under construction for over 3 years, and expected completion by year-end 2012 has amounted to just less than 25% line completion. So far the construction rate on 5 different work fronts has been slow or even delayed.	El Sombrero	El Sombrero	Guárico State
Norte Llanero (Northern Plains)	Anaco – Tinaco	This 468 km line is under construction for over 3 years, and expected completion by year-end 2012 has amounted to just less than 25% line completion. So far the construction rate on 5 different work fronts has been slow or even delayed.	Dos Caminos	Dos Caminos	Guárico State
Norte Llanero (Northern Plains)	Anaco – Tinaco	This 468 km line is under construction for over 3 years, and expected completion by year-end 2012 has amounted to just less than 25% line completion. So far the construction rate on 5 different work fronts has been slow or even delayed.	El Pao	El Pao	Cojedes State
Norte Llanero (Northern Plains)	Anaco – Tinaco	This 468 km line is under construction for over 3 years, and expected completion by year-end 2012 has amounted to just less than 25% line completion. So far the construction rate on 5 different work fronts has been slow or even delayed.	Tinaco	Tinaco	Cojedes State
Norte Llanero (Northern Plains)	Tinaco – Barinas	planning stage	San Carlos	San Carlos	Cojedes State
Norte Llanero (Northern Plains)	Tinaco – Barinas	planning stage	Acarigua	Acarigua	Portuguesa State
Norte Llanero (Northern Plains)	Tinaco – Barinas	planning stage	Guanare	Guanare	Portuguesa State
Norte Llanero (Northern Plains)	Tinaco – Barinas	planning stage	Sabaneta	Sabaneta	Barinas State
Norte Llanero (Northern Plains)	Tinaco – Barinas	planning stage	Barinas	Barinas	Barinas State
Norte Llanero (Northern Plains)	Barinas – San Cristobál	planning stage	Barinitas	Barinitas	Barinas State
Norte Llanero (Northern Plains)	Barinas – San Cristobál	planning stage	San Rafael del Piñal	San Rafael del Piñal	Táchira State
Norte Llanero (Northern Plains)	Barinas – San Cristobál	planning stage	San Cristóbal	San Cristóbal State	Táchira
Centro Sur (South Central)	San Juan de Los Morros – San Fernando de Apure	The original reconstruction and extension of this 252+ km line was to be completed by year-end 2011 for freight and passenger. This project continues, however slow the main train authorities remain optimistic and emphatic that everything will be ready in 2012.	San Juan de Los Morros	San Juan de Los Morros	Guárico State
Centro Sur (South Central)	San Juan de Los Morros – San Fernando de Apure	The original reconstruction and extension of this 252+ km line was to be completed by year-end 2011 for freight and passenger. This project continues, however slow the main train authorities remain optimistic and emphatic that everything will be ready in 2012.	Ortíz	Ortíz	Guárico State
Centro Sur (South Central)	San Juan de Los Morros – San Fernando de Apure	The original reconstruction and extension of this 252+ km line was to be completed by year-end 2011 for freight and passenger. This project continues, however slow the main train authorities remain optimistic and emphatic that everything will be ready in 2012.	Dos Caminos	Dos Caminos	Guárico State
Centro Sur (South Central)	San Juan de Los Morros – San Fernando de Apure	The original reconstruction and extension of this 252+ km line was to be completed by year-end 2011 for freight and passenger. This project continues, however slow the main train authorities remain optimistic and emphatic that everything will be ready in 2012.	Calabozo	Calabozo	Guárico State
Centro Sur (South Central)	San Juan de Los Morros – San Fernando de Apure	The original reconstruction and extension of this 252+ km line was to be completed by year-end 2011 for freight and passenger. This project continues, however slow the main train authorities remain optimistic and emphatic that everything will be ready in 2012.	Corozopando	Corozopando	Guárico State
Centro Sur (South Central)	San Juan de Los Morros – San Fernando de Apure	The original reconstruction and extension of this 252+ km line was to be completed by year-end 2011 for freight and passenger. This project continues, however slow the main train authorities remain optimistic and emphatic that everything will be ready in 2012.	Camaguán	Camaguán	Guárico State
Centro Sur (South Central)	San Juan de Los Morros – San Fernando de Apure	The original reconstruction and extension of this 252+ km line was to be completed by year-end 2011 for freight and passenger. This project continues, however slow the main train authorities remain optimistic and emphatic that everything will be ready in 2012.	San Fernando de Apure	San Fernando de Apure	Apure State
Centro Sur (South Central)	Chaguaramas – Caicara del Orinoco	The original reconstruction and extension to be completed by year-end 2011 for freight and passenger went by without success. The first part of the line service from Chaguaramos to Cabruta some 201 km is scheduled to be completed by 2012. The extended part that includes crossing on the 3rd bridge over the Orinoco River (this one is approx 8.7 km long and presently under construction) and connection to Caicara needs to have a defined date.	Chaguaramas	Chaguaramas	Guárico State
Centro Sur (South Central)	Chaguaramas – Caicara del Orinoco	The original reconstruction and extension to be completed by year-end 2011 for freight and passenger went by without success. The first part of the line service from Chaguaramos to Cabruta some 201 km is scheduled to be completed by 2012. The extended part that includes crossing on the 3rd bridge over the Orinoco River (this one is approx 8.7 km long and presently under construction) and connection to Caicara needs to have a defined date.	Las Mercedes	Las Mercedes	Guárico State
Centro Sur (South Central)	Chaguaramas – Caicara del Orinoco	The original reconstruction and extension to be completed by year-end 2011 for freight and passenger went by without success. The first part of the line service from Chaguaramos to Cabruta some 201 km is scheduled to be completed by 2012. The extended part that includes crossing on the 3rd bridge over the Orinoco River (this one is approx 8.7 km long and presently under construction) and connection to Caicara needs to have a defined date.	El Mejo	El Mejo	Guárico State
Centro Sur (South Central)	Chaguaramas – Caicara del Orinoco	The original reconstruction and extension to be completed by year-end 2011 for freight and passenger went by without success. The first part of the line service from Chaguaramos to Cabruta some 201 km is scheduled to be completed by 2012. The extended part that includes crossing on the 3rd bridge over the Orinoco River (this one is approx 8.7 km long and presently under construction) and connection to Caicara needs to have a defined date.	Santa Rita	Santa Rita	Guárico State
Centro Sur (South Central)	Chaguaramas – Caicara del Orinoco	The original reconstruction and extension to be completed by year-end 2011 for freight and passenger went by without success. The first part of the line service from Chaguaramos to Cabruta some 201 km is scheduled to be completed by 2012. The extended part that includes crossing on the 3rd bridge over the Orinoco River (this one is approx 8.7 km long and presently under construction) and connection to Caicara needs to have a defined date.	Arrecife	Arrecife	Guárico State
Centro Sur (South Central)	Chaguaramas – Caicara del Orinoco	The original reconstruction and extension to be completed by year-end 2011 for freight and passenger went by without success. The first part of the line service from Chaguaramos to Cabruta some 201 km is scheduled to be completed by 2012. The extended part that includes crossing on the 3rd bridge over the Orinoco River (this one is approx 8.7 km long and presently under construction) and connection to Caicara needs to have a defined date.	Cabruta	Cabruta	Guárico State
Centro Sur (South Central)	Chaguaramas – Caicara del Orinoco	The original reconstruction and extension to be completed by year-end 2011 for freight and passenger went by without success. The first part of the line service from Chaguaramos to Cabruta some 201 km is scheduled to be completed by 2012. The extended part that includes crossing on the 3rd bridge over the Orinoco River (this one is approx 8.7 km long and presently under construction) and connection to Caicara needs to have a defined date.	Caicara del Orinoco	Caicara del Orinoco	Bolívar State
Oriental (Eastern)	Guanta – Naricual	abandoned line, under study for upgrade	Guanta	Guanta	Anzoátegui State
Oriental (Eastern)	Guanta – Naricual	abandoned line, under study for upgrade	Naricual	Naricual	
Oriental (Eastern)	Ciudad Guayana – Manicaure	under construction	Puerto Ordaz	Ciudad Guayana Este	Bolívar State
Oriental (Eastern)	Ciudad Guayana – Manicaure	under construction	Maturín	Maturín	Monagas State
Oriental (Eastern)	Ciudad Guayana – Manicaure	under construction	Manicaure	Manicaure	Sucre State
Oriental (Eastern)	Anaco – Cúa	planning stage	Anaco	Anaco	Anzoátegui State
Oriental (Eastern)	Anaco – Cúa	planning stage	Barcelona	Barcelona	Anzoátegui State
Oriental (Eastern)	Anaco – Cúa	planning stage	El José	El José	Anzoátegui State
Oriental (Eastern)	Anaco – Cúa	planning stage	Puerto Píritu	Puerto Píritu	Anzoátegui State
Oriental (Eastern)	Anaco – Cúa	planning stage	Higuerote	Higuerote	Miranda State
Oriental (Eastern)	Anaco – Cúa	planning stage	Cúa	Cúa	Miranda State
Occidental (Western)	Maracaibo – Sabana de Mendoza	planning stage, had symbolic laying of the first rail and project definition	Maracaibo	beside a Maracaibo Metro station	Zulia State
Occidental (Western)	Maracaibo – Sabana de Mendoza	planning stage, had symbolic laying of the first rail and project definition	El Tablazo	El Tablazo	Zulia State
Occidental (Western)	Maracaibo – Sabana de Mendoza	planning stage, had symbolic laying of the first rail and project definition	Santa Rita	Santa Rita	Zulia State
Occidental (Western)	Maracaibo – Sabana de Mendoza	planning stage, had symbolic laying of the first rail and project definition	Cabimas	Cabimas	Zulia State
Occidental (Western)	Maracaibo – Sabana de Mendoza	planning stage, had symbolic laying of the first rail and project definition	Ciudad Ojeda	Ciudad Ojeda	Zulia State
Occidental (Western)	Maracaibo – Sabana de Mendoza	planning stage, had symbolic laying of the first rail and project definition	Lagunillas	Lagunillas	Zulia State
Occidental (Western)	Maracaibo – Sabana de Mendoza	planning stage, had symbolic laying of the first rail and project definition	Bachaquero	Bachaquero	Zulia State
Occidental (Western)	Maracaibo – Sabana de Mendoza	planning stage, had symbolic laying of the first rail and project definition	Mene Grande	Mene Grande	Zulia State
Occidental (Western)	Maracaibo – Sabana de Mendoza	planning stage, had symbolic laying of the first rail and project definition	Sabana de Mendoza	Sabana de Mendoza	Trujillo State
Occidental (Western)	Sabana de Mendoza – Barquisimeto	planning stage	Carora	Carora	Lara State
Occidental (Western)	Sabana de Mendoza – Barquisimeto	planning stage	Barquisimeto	Barquisimeto	Lara State
Occidental (Western)	Encontrados – Machiques	planning stage	Encontrados	Encontrados	Zulia State
Occidental (Western)	Encontrados – Machiques	planning stage	Machiques	Machiques	Zulia State
Occidental (Western)	Machiques – Maracaibo – Puerto Las Américas	planning stage	Maracaibo	Maracaibo	Zulia State
Occidental (Western)	Machiques – Maracaibo – Puerto Las Américas	planning stage	Puerto Las Américas	Puerto Las Américas	Zulia State
Región Guayana (Guayana region)	San Fernando – Tucupita	planning stage	San Fernando de Apure	San Fernando de Apure	Apure State
Región Guayana (Guayana region)	San Fernando – Tucupita	planning stage	Cabruta	Cabruta	Gúarico State
Región Guayana (Guayana region)	San Fernando – Tucupita	planning stage	Caicara	Caicara	Bolívar State
Región Guayana (Guayana region)	San Fernando – Tucupita	planning stage	Ciudad Bolívar	Ciudad Bolívar	Bolívar State
Región Guayana (Guayana region)	San Fernando – Tucupita	planning stage	Ciudad Guayana	Puerto Ordaz	Bolívar State
Región Guayana (Guayana region)	San Fernando – Tucupita	planning stage	Tucupita	Tucupita	Delta Amacuro State
Región Guayana (Guayana region)	Caicara – Puerto Ayacucho	planning stage	Puerto Ayacucho	Puerto Ayacucho	Amazonas State
Caracas – La Guaira	Caracas – La Guaira	planning stage – In May 2007 a maglev train was proposed to link Caracas to La Guaira and Simón Bolívar International Airport. A route is being studied prior to obtaining funding.	Caracas	La Rinconada	Distrito Federal
Caracas – La Guaira	Caracas – La Guaira	planning stage – In May 2007 a maglev train was proposed to link Caracas to La Guaira and Simón Bolívar International Airport. A route is being studied prior to obtaining funding.	Maiquetía	Maiquetía (near the airport)	Vargas State
Caracas – La Guaira	Caracas – La Guaira	planning stage – In May 2007 a maglev train was proposed to link Caracas to La Guaira and Simón Bolívar International Airport. A route is being studied prior to obtaining funding.	La Guaira	La Guaira by the seaport	Vargas State
Recreacional (recreational)	Parque Recreacional El Encanto	Reconstruction for passenger service by end of 2012	Los Teques	Los Teques	Miranda State

== Operational ==
=== Fully Updated ===
==== Caracas – Cúa branch ====
Train leaves General Ezequiel Zamora Station, Cúa.

After 70 years without major improvements to the Venezuelan railway system, the Caracas – Cúa line was opened for public service on October 15, 2006. The route is part of the projected Ezequiel Zamora railway axis. It starts from Caracas and ends in Cúa, Miranda State. The main terminal is located next to the Caracas Metro (subway) line 3 La Rinconada Terminal Station. This short North-South line can be passenger travelled in approximately, 30 minutes. The following are the names of the 4 stations and the estimated travel time from Caracas and then the additional time to the next station. Also there is a delay time before the train restarts the trip which can be adjusted by management policy.

Station	Location		Travel Time	Wait Time
Libertador Simón Bolívar	Caracas	Federal District		
Generalísimo Francisco de Miranda	North Charallave	Miranda State	17 min	2 min
Don Simón Rodríguez	South Charallave	Miranda State	4 min	2 min
General Ezequiel Zamora	Cúa	Miranda State	10 min	

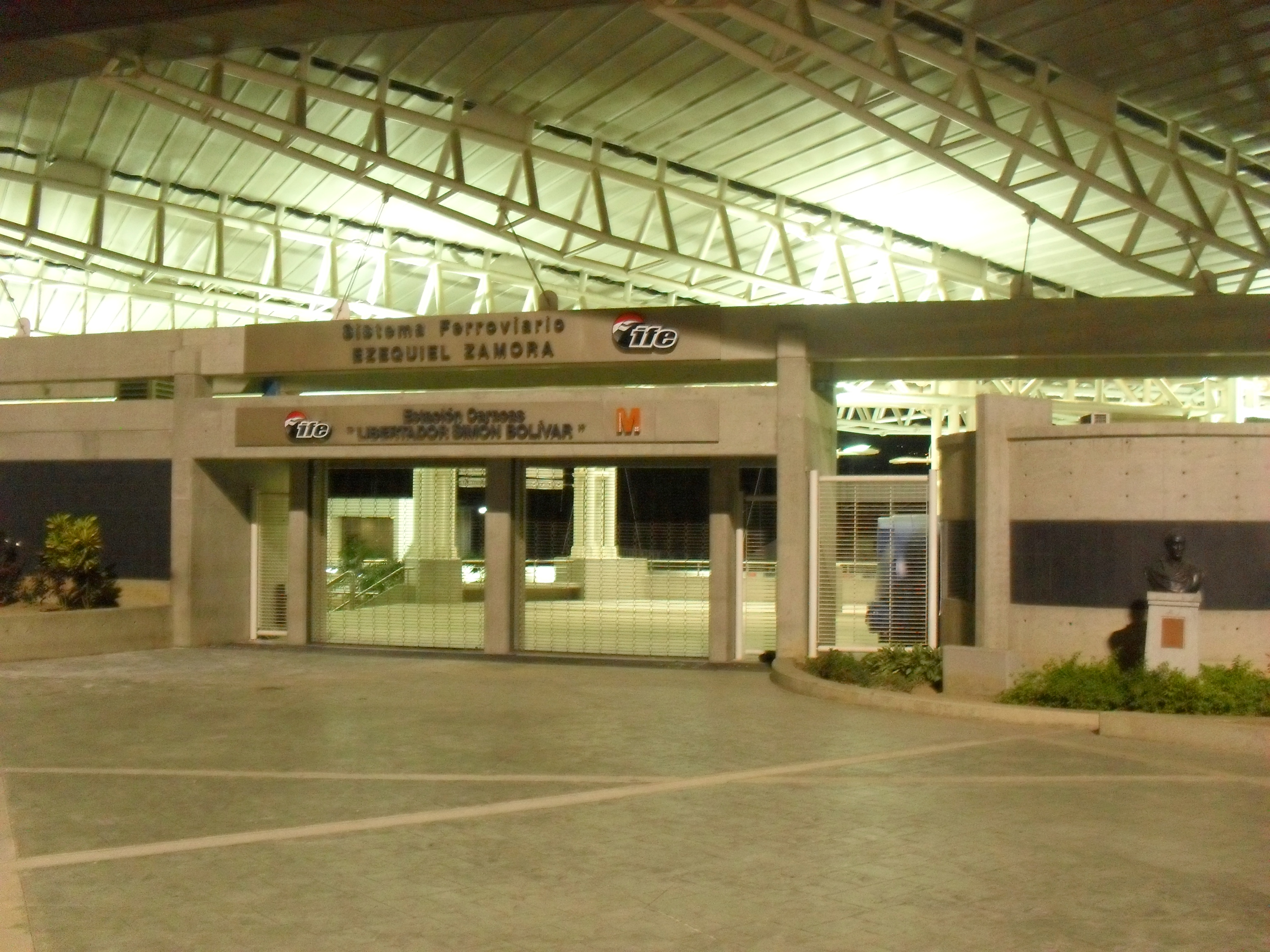
Libertador Simón Bolívar station, Caracas

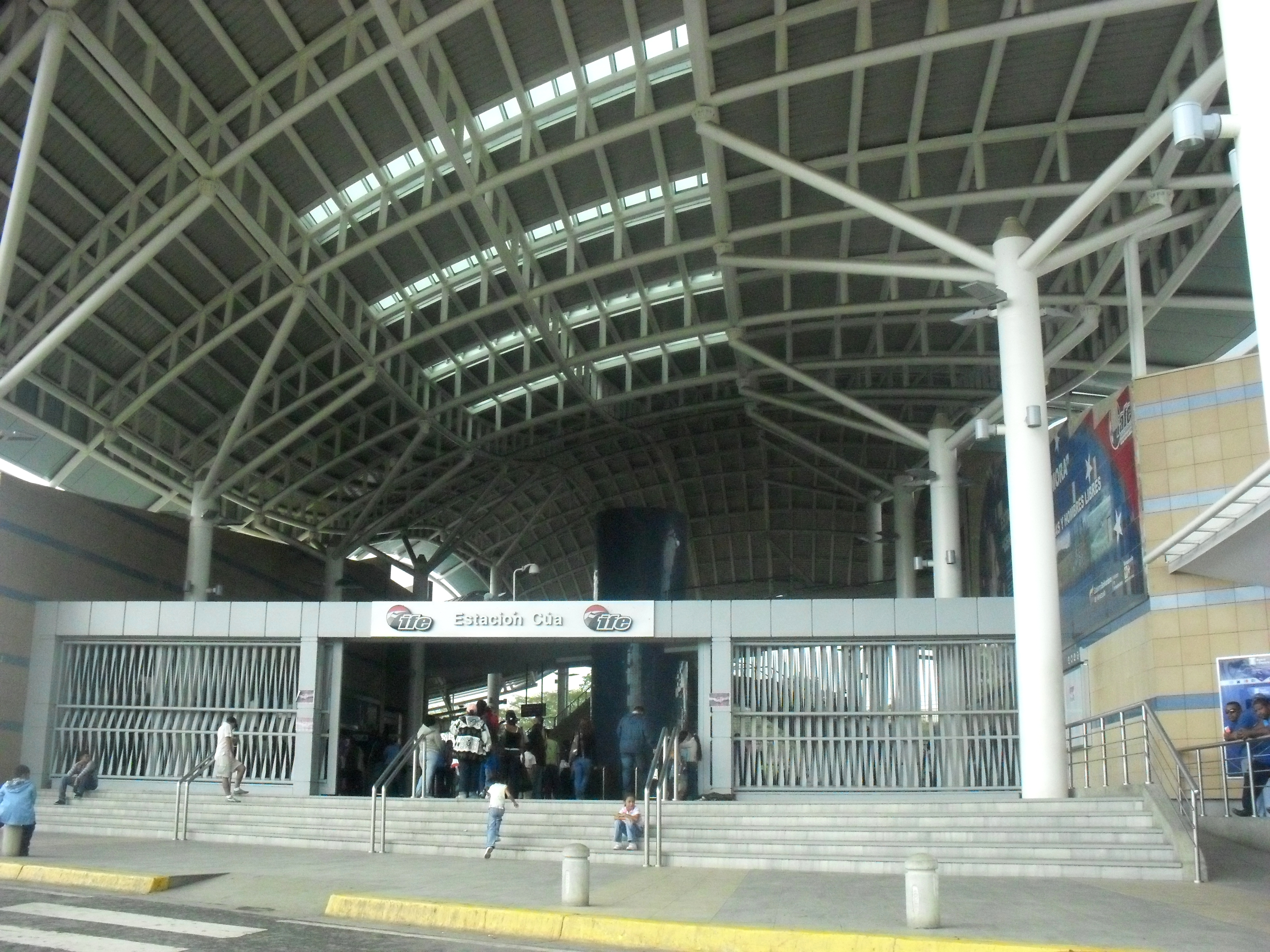
Ezequiel Zamora station, Cúa

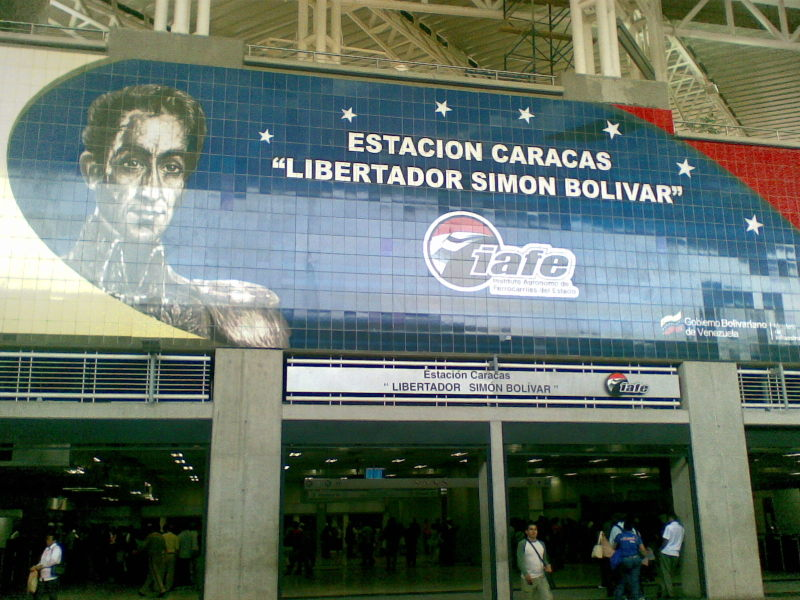
Libertador Simón Bolívar station

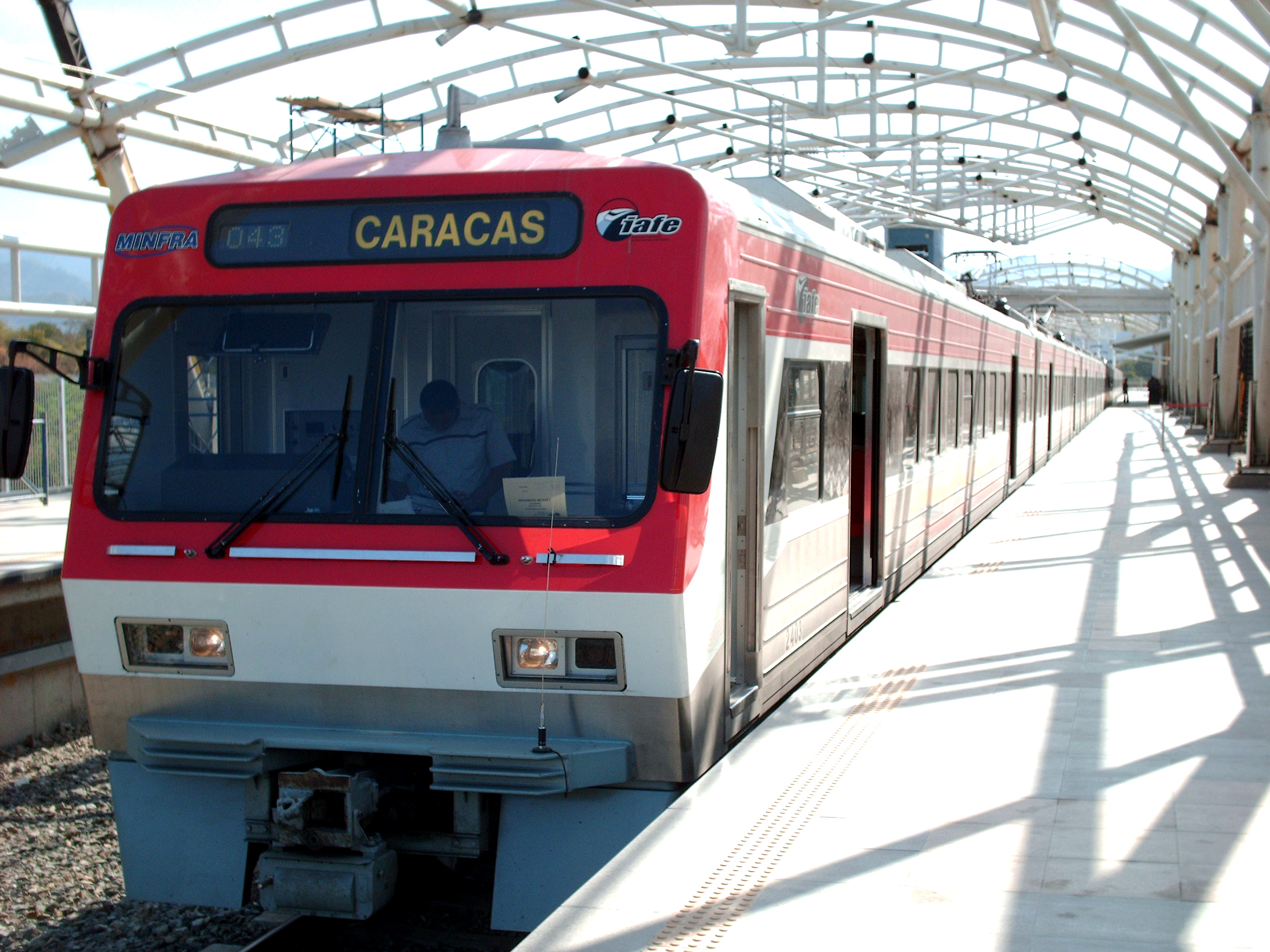
Cua station, Commuter train for local passengers

=== Modernization/reconstruction ===
==== Puerto Cabello – Yaritagua – Barquisimeto branch ====
The main branch of the Simón Bolívar railway axis is a 177 km (110 mi) east–west line where a full upgrade/restoration was planned with a projected completion date of 2010. This line connects Carabobo State, Yaracuy State and Lara State. The stations are as follows:

- Puerto Cabello, Carabobo State;
- Morón, Carabobo State;
- San Felipe, Yaracuy State;
- Urama, Yaracuy State;
- Chivacoa, Yaracuy State;
- Yaritagua, Yaracuy State and;
- Barquisimeto, Lara State.

==== Yaritagua – Acarigua branch ====
Another branch of the Simón Bolívar railway axis is a 113 km (70 mi) north–south line connection between the Yaritagua, Yaracuy State, Acarigua, Portuguesa State where a full upgrade restoration is in progress.

==== San Juan de los Morros – San Fernando de Apure branch ====
A 252 km (157 mi) north–south line where a full upgrade/restoration was originally projected for completion by the end of 2010. This line was supposed to connect Guárico State and Apure State.

== Services ==
The railway provides both freight and passenger service.

=== Freight ===
Between Puerto Cabello and Barquisimeto movement of loads over 3 million tons per month have been exceeded.

Branch	Period		Frequency
Puerto Cabello – Barquisimeto	Monday to Monday	6:00 a.m. and 11:30 a.m.	twice daily

=== Passenger ===
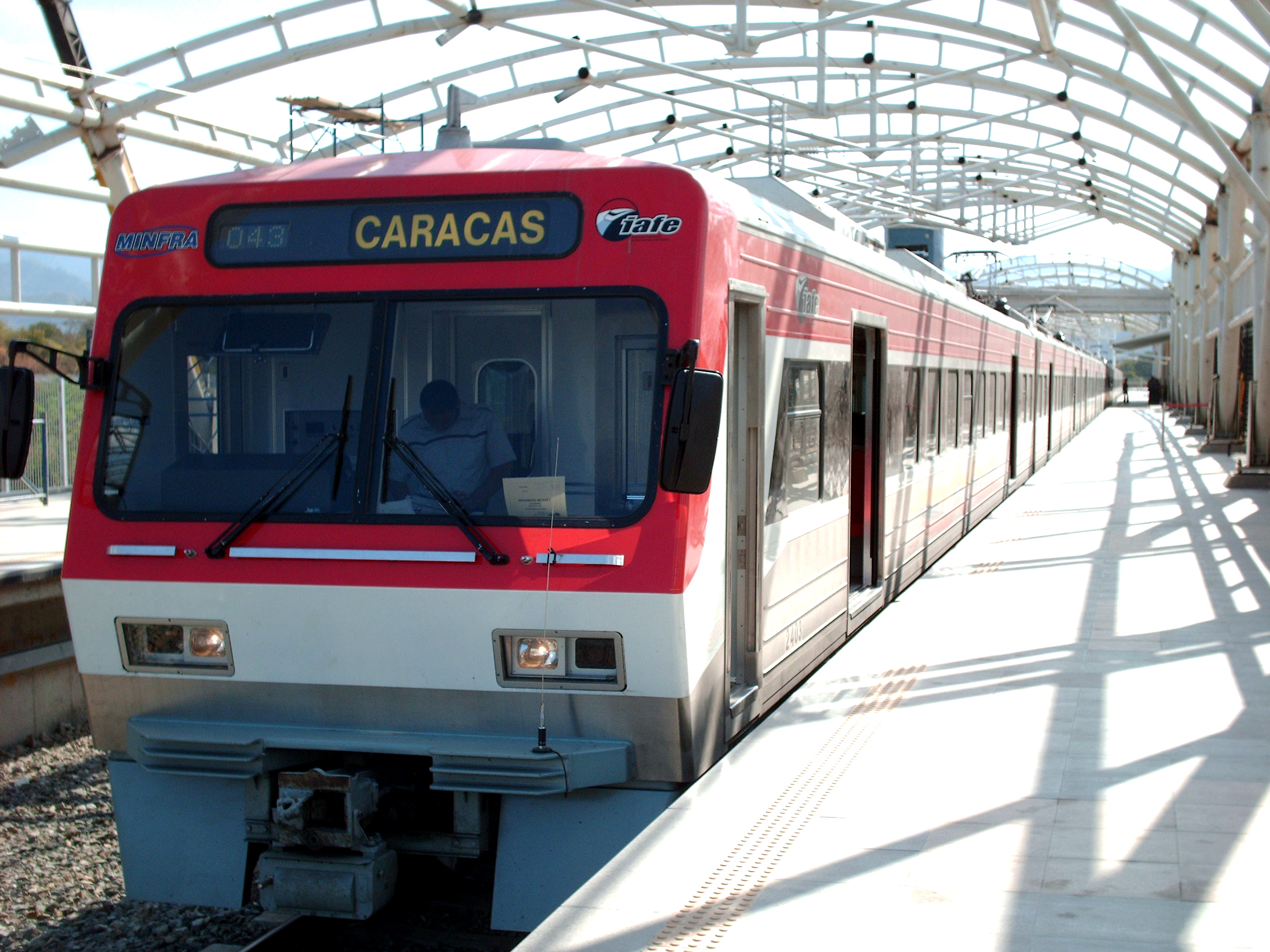
Cúa Station, Commuter short distance Train

As of July 16, 2007, passenger service is provided only between the stations on the Caracas – Cúa Branch. The following table shows the train schedule:

Branch	Period		Frequency
Caracas – Cúa	Monday to Friday	5:00 a.m. – 9:00 a.m.	every 20 minutes
Caracas – Cúa	Monday to Friday	9:00 a.m. – 5:00 p.m.	every 30 minutes
Caracas – Cúa	Monday to Friday	5:00 p.m. – 10:00 p.m.	every 20 minutes
Caracas – Cúa	Saturday and holidays	7:00 a.m. – 8:00 p.m.	every 60 minutes

All times are subject to change depending on special events, system improvements and the decisions the managers may make. In 2023, in response to growing demand, the IFE gave in to pressure and finally introduced Sunday services.

== Construction ==
=== Work in progress ===
==== Puerto Cabello – La Encrucijada branch ====
Another part of the Ezequiel Zamora railway axis has 108 km (67 mi) under construction between the sea port city of Puerto Cabello, Carabobo State, and the crossroads town of La Encrucijada, Aragua State. The line is predominately east–west, although between the station at Naguanagua and the terminus at Puerto Cabello the route changes to a north–south direction.

14 tunnels including the 7.8 km (4.8 mi) Bárbula Tunnel (the longest in South America) and many bridges are required to connect between the various stations along this line. The project is behind schedule. In 2016 work on the Puerto Cabello railway was described as "irregular and marked by slow payments by the client as a result of the country’s poor economic conditions, mainly related to the drop in the price of oil."

The new stations under construction are found in:

- La Encrucijada, Aragua State; the hub in La Encrucijada will provide easy access to the users from Cagua, Aragua State.
- Maracay, Aragua State;
- Mariara, Carabobo State;
- San Joaquín, Carabobo State
  - San Diego, Carabobo State*
  - Naguanagua, Carabobo State*
- Puerto Cabello, Carabobo State

(*)These two are suburban cities of Valencia.

==== Chaguaramas – Las Mercedes – Cabruta – Caicara del Orinoco branch ====
Another branch north–south line 201 km (125 mi) found mainly in Guarico State that will cross the Orinoco River and enter the Bolívar State.

==== Maracaibo – Sabana de Mendoza branch ====
This 233 km (145 mi) will start in the capital city of Maracaibo Zulia State nearby the Maracaibo Metro (subway) station. The line will cross the mouth of Lake Maracaibo in a combination tunnel/bridge under construction in an east–west direction and after the El Tablazo stop the line follows a north-north-west to south-south-east direction. The stations are as follows:

- Maracaibo, Zulia State;
- El Tablazo, Zulia State;
- Santa Rita State;
- Cabimas, Zulia State;
- Ciudad Ojeda, Zulia State;
- Lagunillas, Zulia State;
- Bachaquero, Zulia State;
- Mene Grande, Zulia State;
- Sabana de Mendoza, Trujillo State.

==== Puerto Ordaz – Maturín – Manicuare branch ====
This 320 km (199 mi) route will start from Ciudad Guyana Bolívar State, the Puerto Ordaz section and cross the Orinoco River to go south–north to reach Maturín, Monagas State and continue till it reaches the Sucre State where the line will run east–west until it reaches the deep sea water port of Manicuare.

==== Acarigua – Turén branch ====
The completion of an extension of the Simón Bolívar railway axis is a 45 km (28 mi) north–south line connection between Acarigua, and Turén.

==== Tinaco – Anaco branch ====
The first phase 468 km (291 mi) is part of the North Llanero railway axis (northern plains) an east–west line that would provide service to the following cities/towns:

- Anaco, Anzoátegui State;
- Aragua de Barcelona, Anzoátegui State;
- Zaraza, Guárico State;
- Tucupito, Guárico State
- Valle de la Pascua, Guárico State;
- Chaguaramos, Guárico State
- El Sombrero, Guárico State;
- Dos Caminos, Guárico State;
- El Pao, Cojedes;
- Tinaco, Cojedes State,

and work was to be completed by 2012.

As part of a National Rail Development Plan, the standard gauge Tinaco-Anaco railway, was inaugurated with Chinese funding in 2009.

About a fifth of the work had been done by 2012. However, it appears construction stalled in 2013, though the route remains on the State Railways Institution's map of railways under construction .

==== Parque Recreacional – El Encanto branch ====
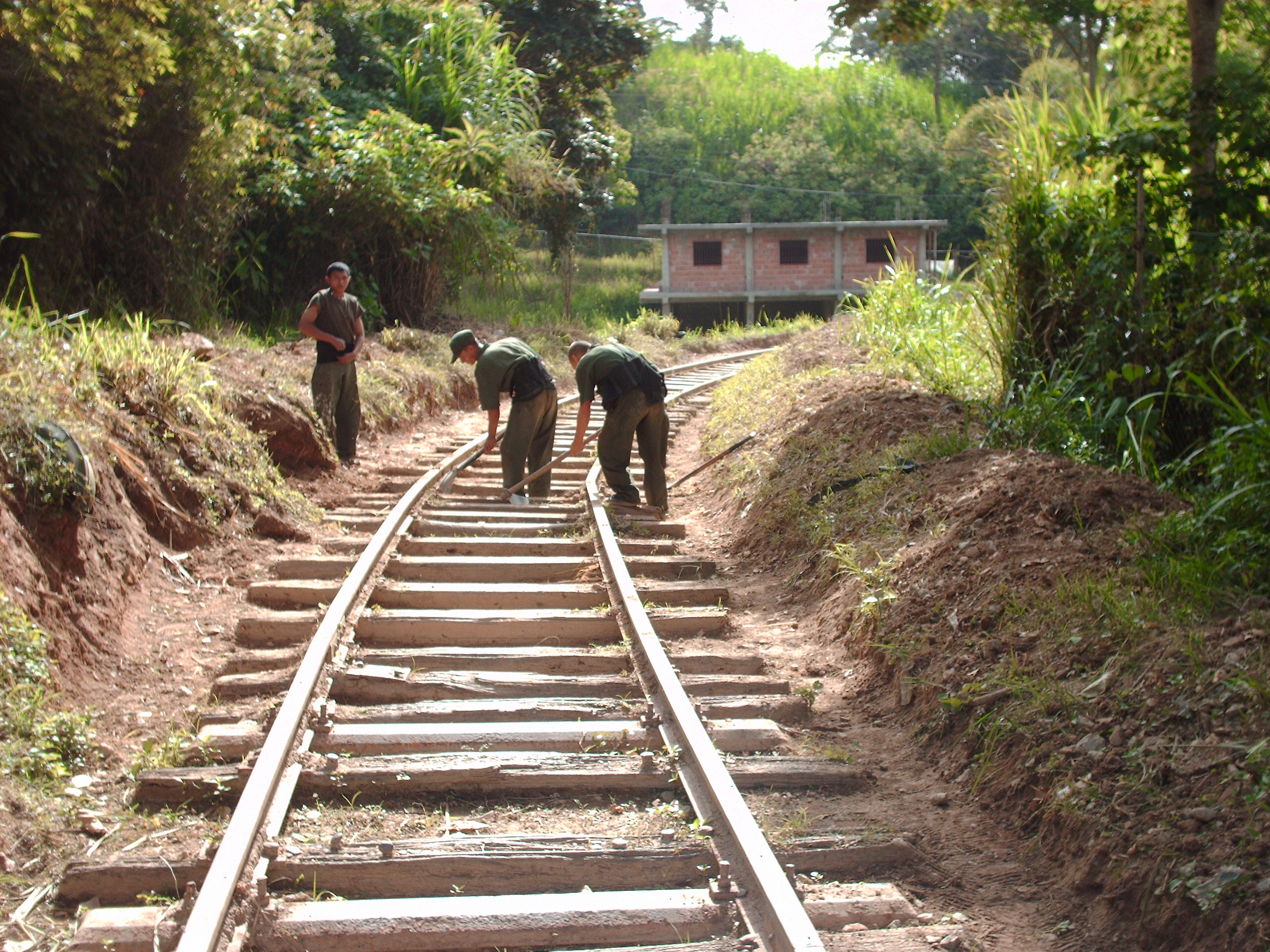
Railroad reconstruction (July 21, 2007)

This 7 km long branch independent of all other rail systems is for recreational purposes only. Mainly is to provide entertainment for tourists, these enchanted sights must be viewed by all. Originally this summit section was part of the Great Venezuela Railway (180 km in length) built in 1909 and operated until after 1937. If all goes well this will be available to the public in 2012.

Work began in 2015 on a 350 million bolivar plan to restore the 7 km (4.3 mi) of track, with 7 tunnels and 5 bridges, to provide a 25-minute journey from Los Lagos to El Encanto.

=== Planning/design stage ===
==== La Encrucijada – Cúa branch ====
The completion of the connection from La Encrucijada to the Tuy Valley will be made at a later date.

==== Sabana de Mendoza – Barquisimeto branch ====
A follow-up future east–west phase will connect Sabana de Mendoza with Barquisimeto Lara State.

==== San Juan de Los Morros – La Encrucijada branch ====
Future expansion includes a north–south connection between San Juan de Los Morros and La Encrucijada Station.

==== Anaco – Maturín branch ====
A separate phase for the North Llanero railway axis to be constructed at a later date will connect in an east–west direction Maturín Monagas State with Anaco Anzoátegui State.

==== Tinaco – San Cristóbal branch ====
The full 1,100 km (684 mi) route, the North Llanero railway axis will be completed at a later date and will add services among the additional following cities:

- San Carlos, Cojedes State;
- Acarigua, Portuguesa State;
- Guanare, Portuguesa State;
- Sabaneta, Barinas State;
- Barinas, Barinas State;
- Barinitas, Barinas State;
- San Rafael del Piñal, Táchira State;
- San Cristóbal, Táchira State.

==== Caicara – Puerto Ayacucho branch ====
This north–south branch will connect Bolívar State to Amazonas State although a possible alternative would be to join San Fernando de Apure to Puerto Ayacucho.

==== San Fernando de Apure – Ciudad Bolívar – Ciudad Guayana – Tucupita branch ====
This east–west route will connect Apure State, Guarico State, Bolivar State, Anzoategui State, Monagas State and Delta Amacuro State. Also this line will have stops in Cabruta and Caicara.

==== Caracas – La Guaira branch ====
This dominately north–south route 50 km (31.1 mi) joining Federal District to Vargas State will provide access to and from Caracas and its International/National Airports and one of its major Seaports.

- Caracas (La Rinconada)
- Maiquetía Airport
- La Guaira Seaport

Completion of this line is expected within five years after fund approval.

There are no rail links to adjacent countries.

== See also ==
- Transport in Venezuela
