= Cúa =

Cúa Nuestra Señora del Rosario de Cúa
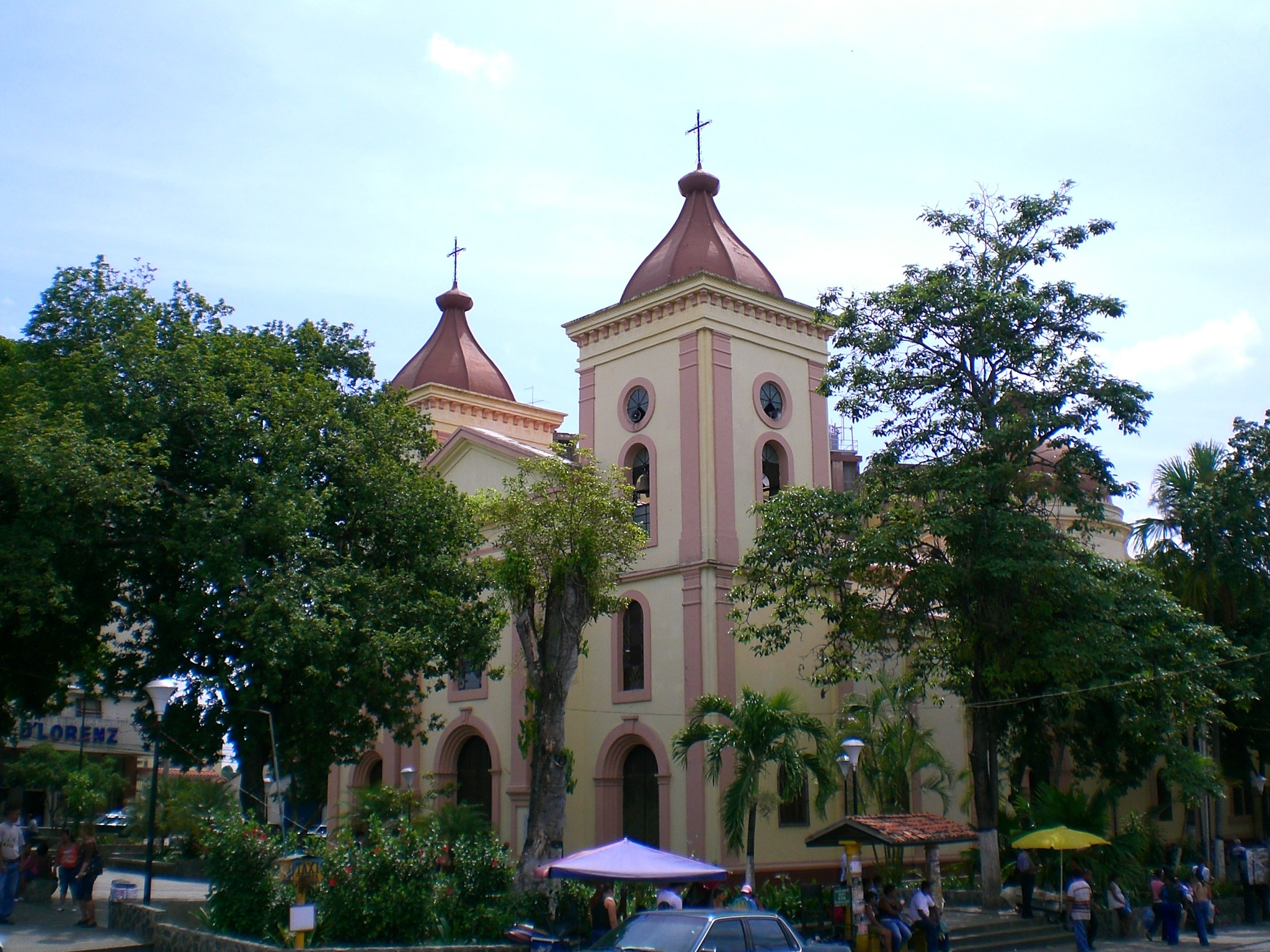
- Our Lady of the Rosary of Cúa Church

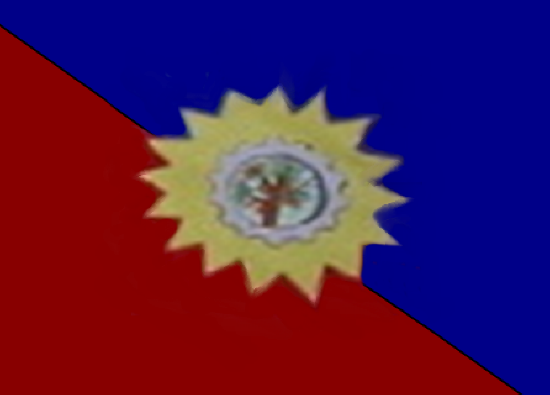
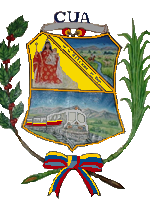
- Flag Coat of arms
- Nickname: The Tuy Pearl
- Location within Venezuela
- Coordinates: 10°10′N 66°53′W
- Country: Venezuela
- State: Miranda
- Municipality: Urdaneta

Government
  - Mayor: Jonatan Herrera Campos (PSUV)

Area
  - Total: 273 km^{2} (105 sq mi)
- Elevation: 490 m (1,610 ft)

Population (July 1, 2009)
  - Total: 127,900
  - Density: 468.5/km^{2} (1,213/sq mi)
- Climate: Aw
- Website: Urdaneta Municipality website

Cúa (founded in 1690) is a small city capital of the Urdaneta Municipality, located in the Miranda State (Estado Miranda) in the north of Venezuela with an altitude of 490 m. Cúa is noted for warm and clear weather, with year-round sunshine and 60 days of rainfall annually, and an average temperature that range from 18 °C to 28 °C, but with relative low humidity.

With leafy forest and meadows, Cúa has a population of 123,000 (2004), mainly dedicated to services and industry (plastic pipes, paper rolls) it's a dormitory town. The most important districts of Cúa are: Nueva Cúa, Lecumberry, La Fila, Mume, Santa rosa and Aparay.

The local Sanctuary of the Virgin of Betania has become famous for its attributed Marian apparitions.

Cúa is one of the locations served by the IFE Ezequiel Zamora Mass Transportation System.

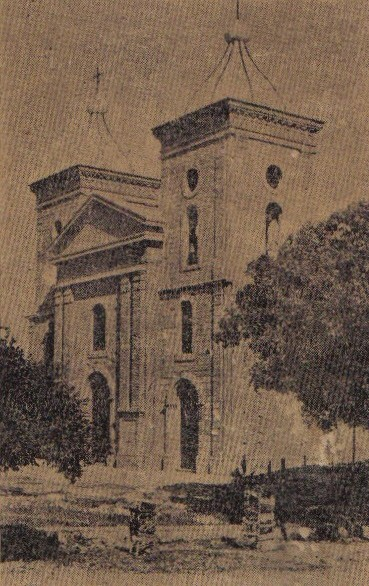
Church of Cúa, 19th century

== Foundation ==
The first establishments of Cúa dates from the pre-Columbian period, being the first founders the Quiriquires natives, has like nickname The Tuy Pearl, because its location at the borders of the Tuy River. After the officially foundation on October 6, 1690 by Fray Manuel de Alesson, under the invocation of Our Lady of the Rosary of Cúa, the first inhabitants came from different regions motivated by the agriculture, due to the fertility and strategic location of the valley. However, this town was founded initially at the site known as Marín in 1633, this first village was destroyed in its totality by a violent earthquake that affected a great part of the Tuy Valleys.

The name of Cúa, according to some historians, has it origin from the Cumanagotos natives, from the Carib language that means Crab, meaning that Cúa is the place where the crab abounds. Others affirm that its name is associate with Apacuana, a brave native woman from the region, that fought against the Spaniards. Others think that that name was giving in honor to the native Cue, ally of the Spaniards, that helped in the foundation and consolidation of the town.

== Geography ==
=== Climate ===
Climate data for Cúa
Month	Jan	Feb	Mar	Apr	May	Jun	Jul	Aug	Sep	Oct	Nov	Dec	Year
Mean daily maximum °C (°F)	30.8 (87.4)	32.0 (89.6)	33.4 (92.1)	34.3 (93.7)	33.6 (92.5)	32.1 (89.8)	31.4 (88.5)	31.9 (89.4)	32.7 (90.9)	32.8 (91.0)	32.3 (90.1)	30.8 (87.4)	32.3 (90.2)
Daily mean °C (°F)	24.7 (76.5)	25.5 (77.9)	26.8 (80.2)	27.9 (82.2)	27.9 (82.2)	27.0 (80.6)	26.4 (79.5)	26.5 (79.7)	27.0 (80.6)	27.0 (80.6)	26.6 (79.9)	25.2 (77.4)	26.5 (79.8)
Mean daily minimum °C (°F)	18.6 (65.5)	19.0 (66.2)	20.1 (68.2)	21.5 (70.7)	22.2 (72.0)	22.0 (71.6)	21.4 (70.5)	21.2 (70.2)	21.3 (70.3)	21.2 (70.2)	20.8 (69.4)	19.5 (67.1)	20.7 (69.3)
Average relative humidity (%)	68.8	68.1	65.9	66.3	68.7	70.9	72.3	71.5	69.7	69.6	70.4	69.5	69.3
Source: Instituto Nacional de Meteorología e Hidrología (INAMEH)

== Law and government ==
Cúa has one municipality: Urdaneta Municipality. Venezuelan law specifies that municipal governments have four main functions: executive, legislative, comptroller, and planning. The executive function is managed by the mayor, who is in charge of representing the municipality's administration. The legislative branch is represented by the Municipal Council, composed of seven councillors, charged with the deliberation of new decrees and local laws. The comptroller tasks are managed by the municipal comptroller's office, which oversees accountancy. Finally, planning is represented by the Local Public Planning Council, which manages development projects for the municipality.

== Demographics ==
Cúa has a total area of 273 km^{2} (105.4 mi^{2}), with a population of 123,000 (2004), the city limits by the north with the municipalities Cristóbal Rojas (Charallave) and Guaicaipuro (Paracotos parish), by the south with San Casimiro municipality (Aragua state), by the east with Tomás lander municipality (Santa Bárbara and Ocumare del Tuy parishes) and by the west again with Guicaipuro municipality (Tácata parish). The main routes of communication are the Charallave-Cúa highway, that communicates this cities with the rest of the Tuy Valleys and Caracas, in addition to the connection with the Regional del Centro Freeway, and the road to the Venezuelan plains, the highway to Ocumare and the highway towards Tácata.

=== Cúa districts ===
- Las Brisas
- La Morita
- Lecumberry
- La Magdalena
- La Fila
- Pueblo Nuevo
- Mume
- Santa Rosa
- La Vega
- Quebrada de Cúa
- Los Rosales
- Las Mercedes
- San Antonio de Cúa
- La Mata
- Terrazas de Cúa
- Santa Cruz
- Aparay
- Nueva Cúa
- Petarito
- Sutil
- San Miguel
- Portachuelos
- Aragüita
- Marín

=== Parishes ===
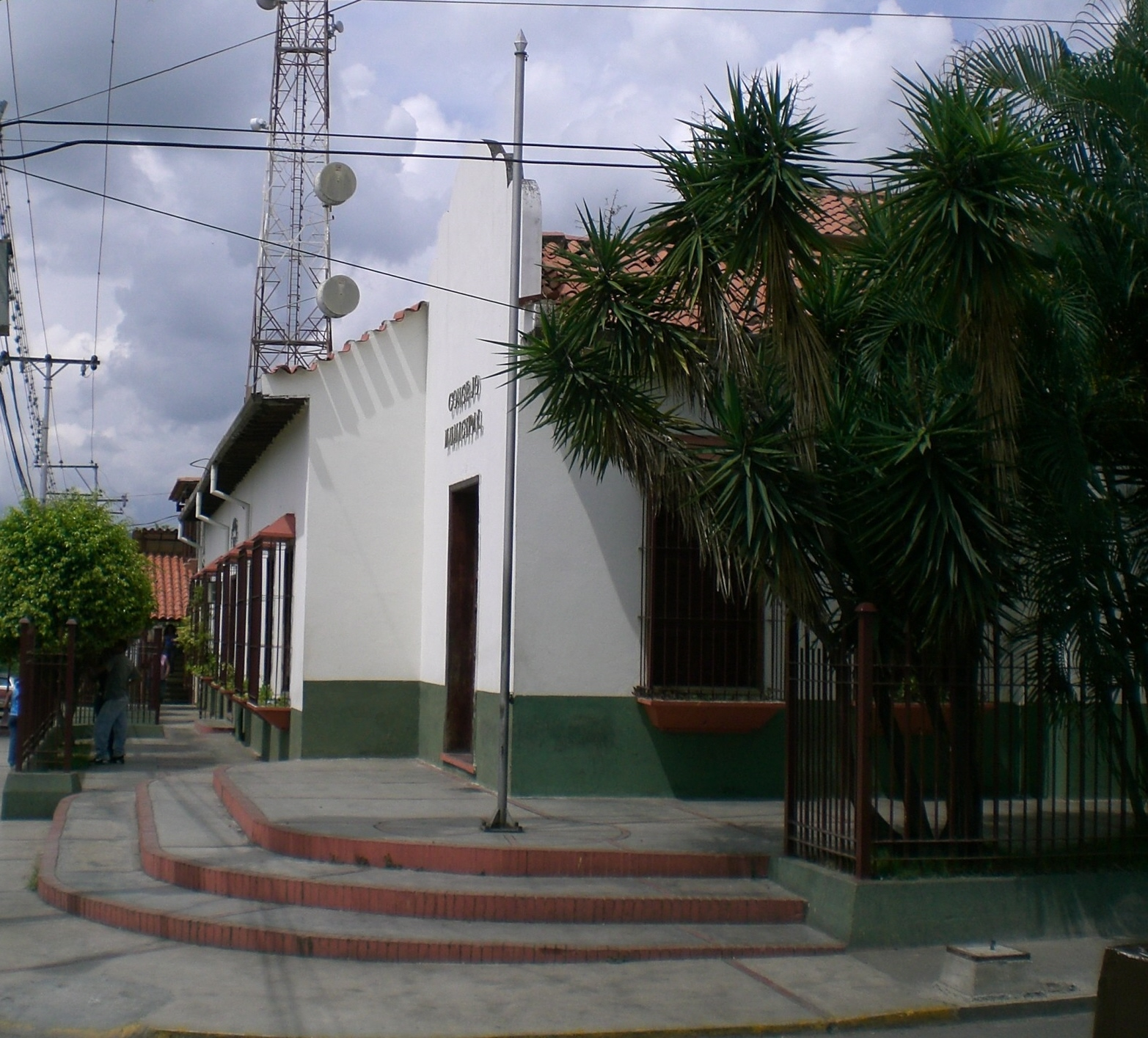
Cúa Municipal Council

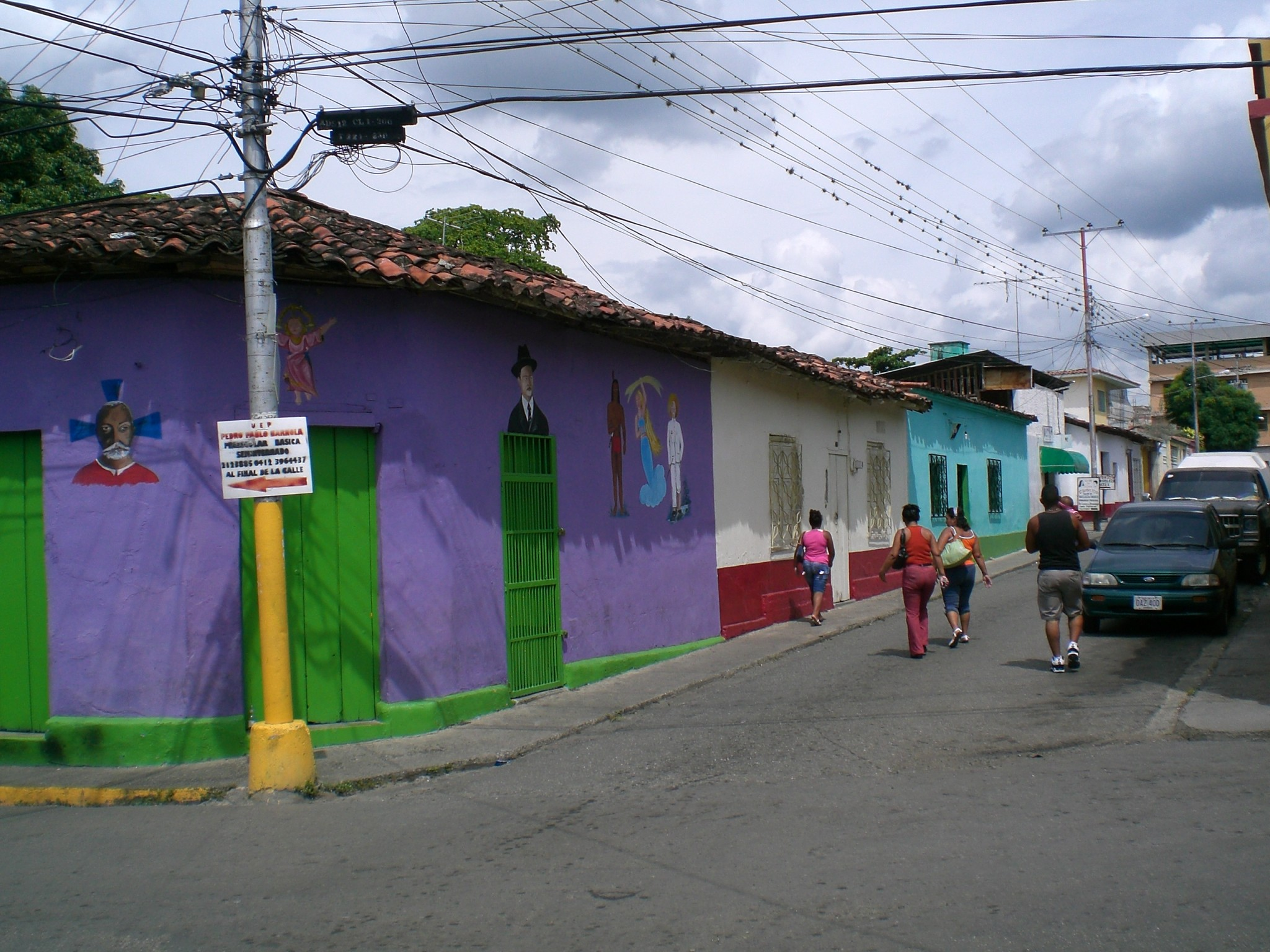
Typical street of the town

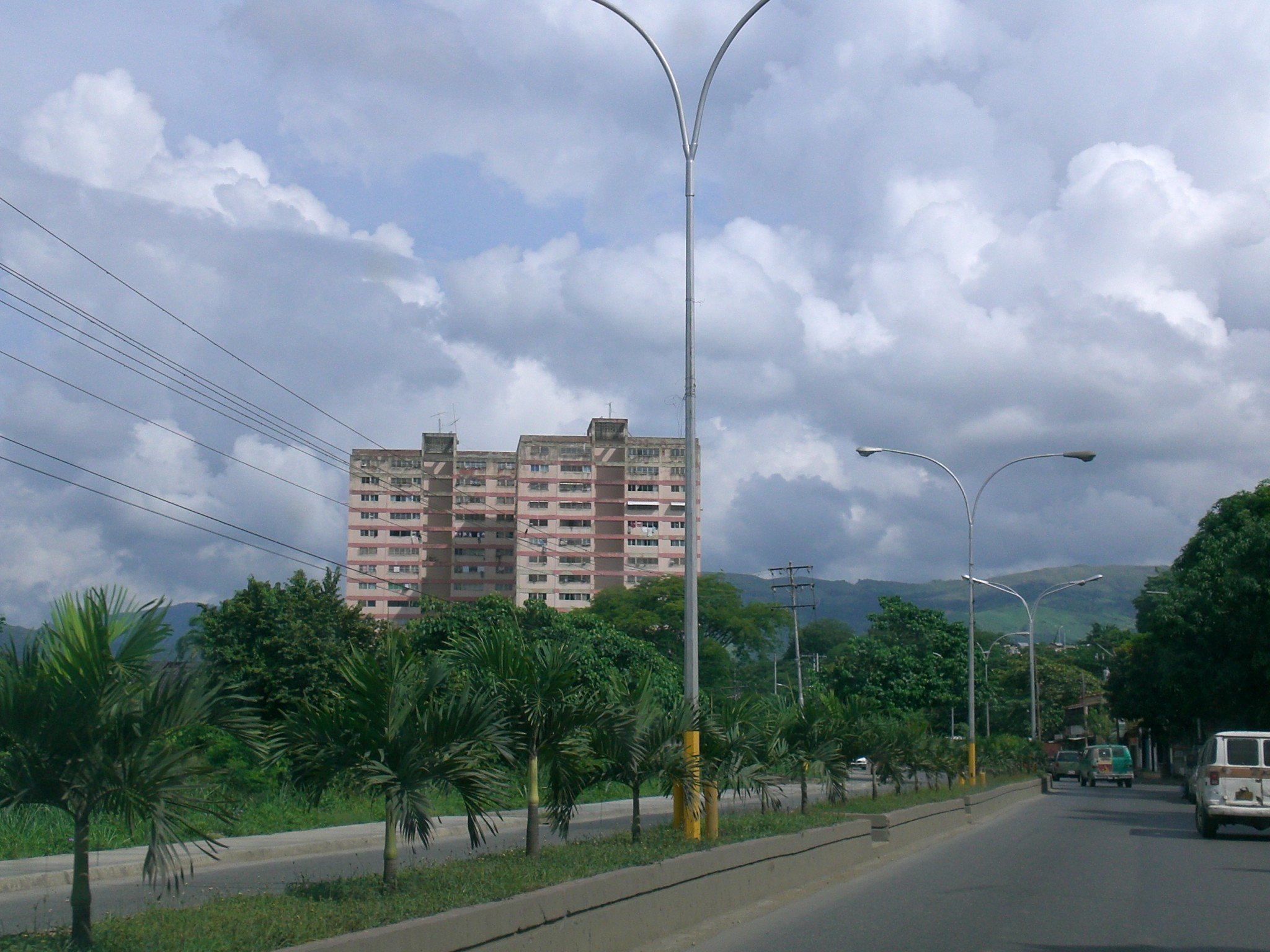
Perimetral Avenue

- Cúa
- Nueva Cúa

== Transportation ==
- Buses are the main means of mass transportation, operated by several companies on normal streets and avenues:
  - bus; large buses.
  - buseta; medium size buses.
  - microbus or colectivo; vans or minivans.
- IFE; train services to and from Caracas and Charallave.

=== Main avenues ===
- Perimetral avenue
- Monseñor Pellín avenue
- José María Carreño street
- El Rosario street
- El Carmen street
- Lecumberry street
- San Rafael street
- Juan España street
- Zamora street

== Notable people ==
- Ezequiel Zamora
- José María Carreño
- Cristóbal Rojas
- Baudilio Díaz
- María Teresa Castillo
- Victor Guillermo Ramos Rangel
- Evencio Castellanos
- Pancho Prin
- Gregor Blanco

== See also ==
- Miranda state
- Charallave
- List of cities in Venezuela
