= Caracas Athenaeum =

Venezuelan theater in Caracas

Coordinates: 10.5001°N 66.8983°W

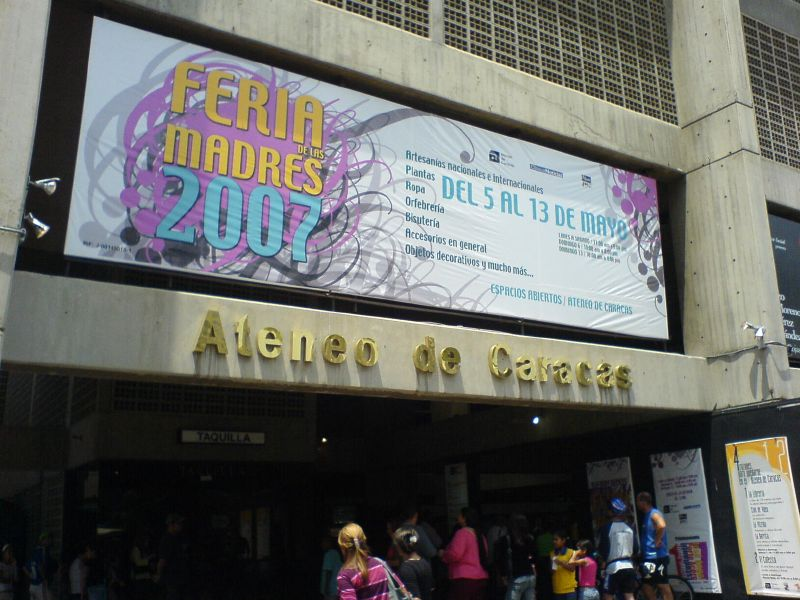
- Established: August 8, 1931
- Location: Caracas, Venezuela
- Director: María Teresa Castillo (founder); Carmen Ramia
- Website: Information about the Athenaeum

The Caracas Athenaeum (known in Spanish as the Ateneo de Caracas) is a cultural institution centred on the arts. It is currently located in Macaracuay, at the Southeast corner of Caracas, after having been expelled by the Bolivarian government from its premises located in the area of Los Caobos, Caracas, Venezuela.

== History ==
The institution was founded on August 8, 1931. The Caracas Athenaeum has always been led by women. The Caracas Athenaeum's founder, María Teresa Castillo, served as president from 1958 to 2012. The first president was the musician Maria Luisa Escobar. She led the Atheneum from its first headquarters, a residence which was owned by general Vicencio Pérez Soto. In 1942, there was a change of both, president and location. The presidency went to the hands of actress Anna Julia Rojas. The new location was the place of birth of the educator Andrés Bello.

The Athenaeum obtained a purpose-built home in Los Caobos. The brutalist building was designed by Gustavo Legorburu, who won the National Prize of Architecture for it that same year. It hosted two theatre auditoriums, a concert hall, a library, a gallery, a cinema, rehearsal rooms, a café, as well as numerous offices. The building is now occupied by the Universidad Experimental Nacional de las Artes, which was created in 2008.

== Activities of the Athenaeum ==
- International Theatre Festival of Caracas - Created by Maria Teresa Castillo and the resident theatre director of the time, Carlos Giménez. Considered one of the top theatre festivals of the world.
- Christmas fair - has stands for artisans, silversmiths, antique dealers...
- Annual painting exhibition - centred on either national or international artists.
- Viewings of art house cinema.
- Theatre season, resident company is Rajatabla. Famous productions include Tu País Está Féliz, Señor Presidente, Bolívar, La Muerte de García Lorca and La Charité de Vallejo.
- Theater Festival José Angel Porte Acero- Created in 1990
