= Dilia Díaz Cisneros =

Venezuelan teacher and poet

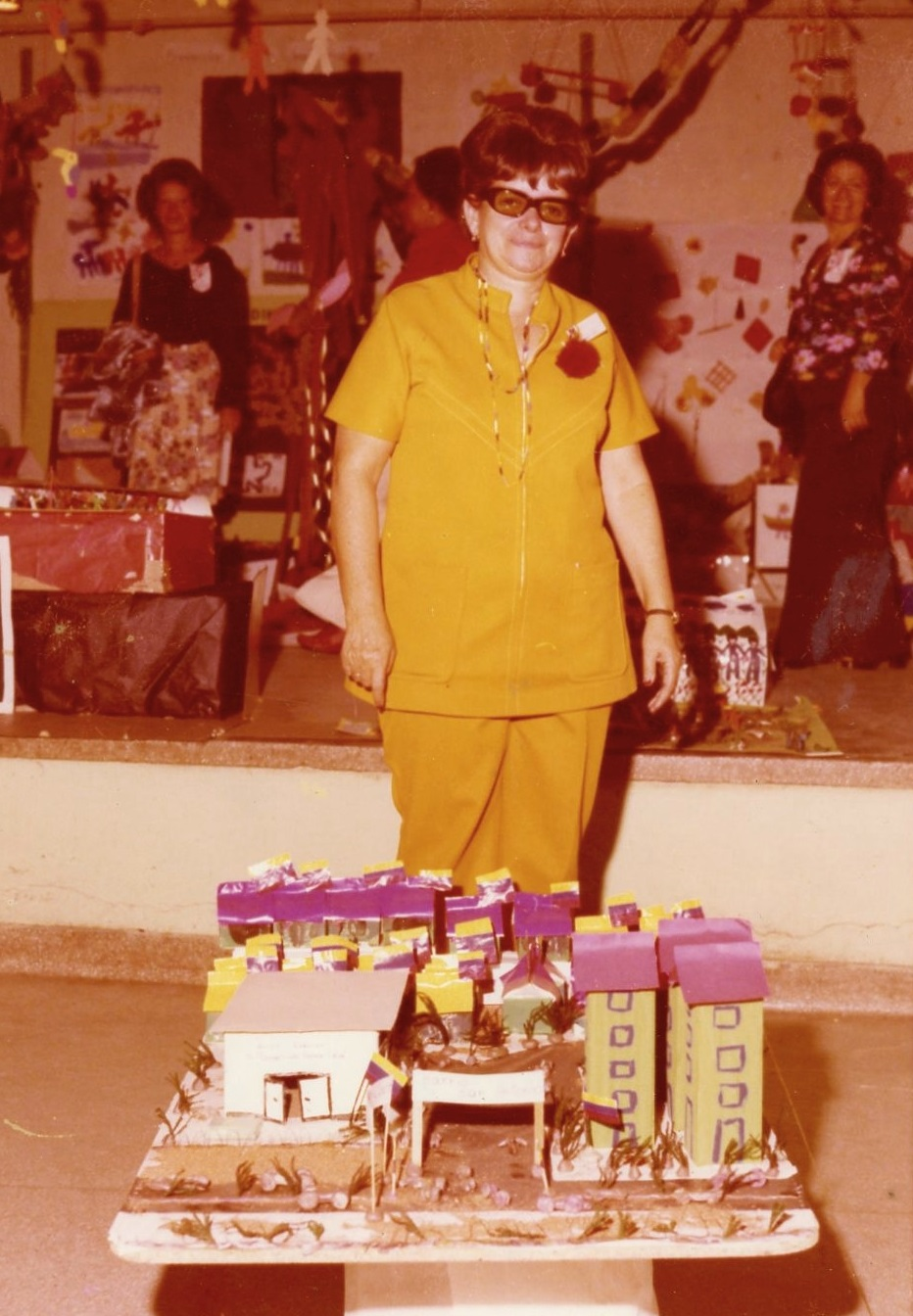
- Born: 1 June 1925; El Hatillo, Miranda state, Venezuela
- Died: 10 July 2017 (aged 92); Caracas
- Occupation: School teacher

Dilia Elena Díaz Cisneros (June 1, 1925 – July 10, 2017) was a Venezuelan teacher and poet born in El Hatillo, Miranda and married Victor Guillermo Ramos in 1947.

She was the founder of the public schools "Bogotá", "Los Jardines" and "Caracciolo Parra León" in Caracas.

Díaz Cisneros died of natural causes at the age of 92 in Caracas.

== See also ==
- Education in Venezuela
