= Pancho Prin =

- Birth name: Francisco de Paula Prin Villegas
- Also known as: Rey del canto Mirandino; El Ruiseñor Mirandino
- Born: April 2, 1930; Cúa, Miranda state, Venezuela
- Died: February 11, 2003 (aged 72); Caracas, Venezuela
- Genres: Central Joropo
- Occupation(s): musician, singer, composer
- Instrument: Buche y capacho

Pancho Prin (born Francisco de Paula Prin Villegas: April 2, 1930 in Cúa, Venezuela) was a Venezuelan musician, singer, and composer. His better known songs include "El Gavilán pollero," "Canto al Amanecer Tuyero," "La Madrugada llanera," "El Aguardiente" and "Atardecer Mirandino."

== See also ==
- Venezuelan music
