= Cristóbal Rojas Municipality =

Cristóbal Rojas Municipality Municipio Cristóbal Rojas
- Municipality
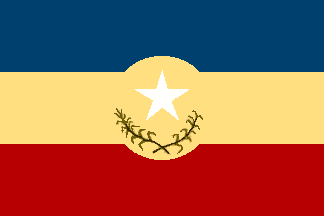
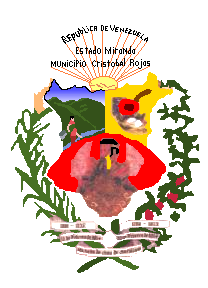
- Flag Coat of arms

- Location in Miranda

- Location in Venezuela
- Coordinates: 10°16′13″N 66°50′01″W
- Country: Venezuela
- State: Miranda
- Municipal seat: Charallave

Government
  - Mayor: Yuhismar Hernández Pérez (Partido Socialista Unido de Venezuela)

Area
  - Total: 171.3 km^{2} (66.1 sq mi)

Population (2007)
  - Total: 96,369
  - Density: 562.6/km^{2} (1,457/sq mi)
- Time zone: UTC−4 (VET)
- Area code(s): 0239
- Website: Official website

Cristóbal Rojas is one of the 21 municipalities (municipios) that makes up the Venezuelan state of Miranda and, according to a 2007 population estimate by the National Institute of Statistics of Venezuela, the municipality has a population of 96,369. The town of Charallave is the municipal seat of the Cristóbal Rojas Municipality. The municipality is named for Venezuelan painter Cristóbal Rojas.

== Demographics ==
The Cristóbal Rojas Municipality, according to a 2007 population estimate by the National Institute of Statistics of Venezuela, has a population of 96,369 (up from 83,568 in 2000). This amounts to 3.4% of the state's population. The municipality's population density is 803.08 inhabitants per square kilometre (2,080.0/sq mi).

== Government ==
The mayor of the Cristóbal Rojas Municipality is Marisela Mendoza de Brito, re-elected on October 31, 2004, with 49% of the vote. The municipality is divided into two parishes; Charallave and Las Brisas.
