= Victor Guillermo Ramos Rangel =

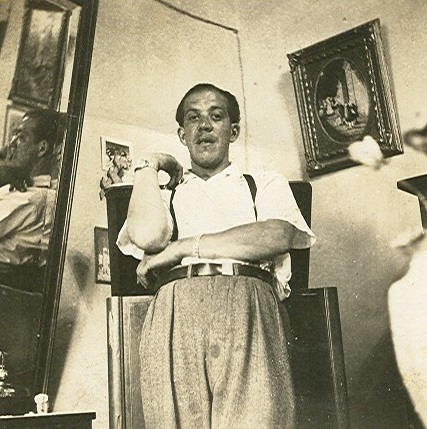
- Victor Guillermo Ramos in 1935

Background information
- Born: February 10, 1911; Cúa, Miranda state, Venezuela
- Died: December 10, 1986 (aged 75) Caracas, Federal District, Venezuela
- Genres: Classical music, Venezuelan popular music
- Occupations: musician, composer
- Instrument: Bassoon
- Formerly of: Venezuela Symphony Orchestra

Victor Guillermo Ramos Rangel (February 10, 1911, Cúa, Miranda state, Venezuela – December 10, 1986, Caracas, Federal District, Venezuela) was a Venezuelan classical musician.

Victor Guillermo Ramos

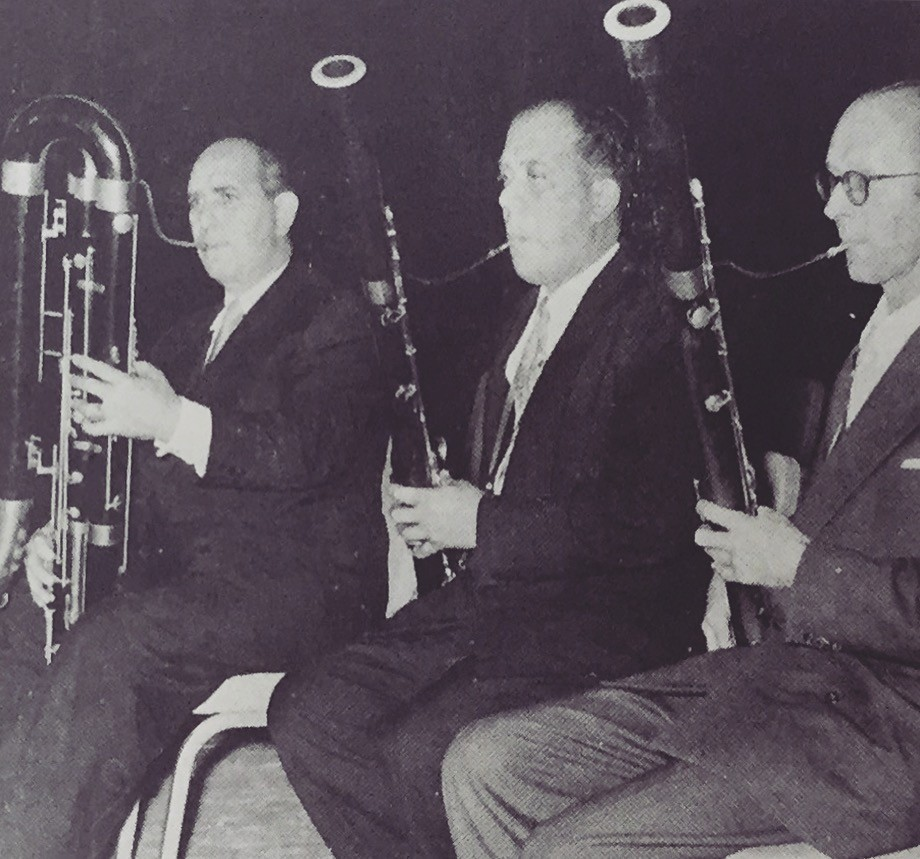
Víctor Guillermo Ramos (center) surrounded by two of his colleagues from the Venezuela Symphony Orchestra.

Started his career in the Caracas Musical Declamation Academy (nowadays renamed in honor to José Ángel Lamas), where he graduated as composer. Ramos was one of the first students of Vicente Emilio Sojo and helped him in the compilation of Venezuelan folk songs.

In 1930, he is part of the founders of the Venezuela Symphony Orchestra and the Orfeón Lamas. In this orchestra dedicated to execute the Bassoon.

From 1941 to 1950, he was professor in Caracas' public schools such as: 19 de abril, Rubén González, Ricardo Zuloaga and Gabriela Mistral."

In 1945, Ramos worked for the Education Ministry and was a music professor in the Cultural Direction of Caracas. In 1947 he married Dilia Díaz Cisneros, with whom he had a daughter and two sons. From 1944 until 1978, he was Professor of Theory, Solfege and Music History at the José Ángel Lamas Superior Music School. In 1978, he participated in the documentary about his hometown, for the series Pueblos de Venezuela on YouTube (Towns of Venezuela), of filmmaker Carlos Oteyza.

Along with the Symphony Orchestra of Venezuela he traveled to Europe and the United States. Also, was member of the National Geographic Society reading club. In his live, he traveled around the world for cultural interests and the learning of new languages. Among his compositions, can be mentioned: Lo Eterno, La maravilla (Aprended flores de mi), A José María España, Bambú de caña batiente; and the songs Gota de agua and Amanecer.

== See also ==
- Orfeón Lamas
- Venezuela Symphony Orchestra
