= María Teresa Castillo =

Venezuelan politician (1908–2012)

- Castillo in 2012

Personal details
- Born: October 15, 1908 Cúa, Miranda, Venezuela
- Died: June 22, 2012 (aged 103) Venezuela
- Spouse: Miguel Otero Silva (m. 1946; died 1985)
- Children: Miguel Henrique Otero; Mariana
- Education: Central University of Venezuela
- Occupation: journalist; politician; political activist; human rights activist; cultural entrepreneur

María Teresa Castillo (October 15, 1908 – June 22, 2012) was a Venezuelan journalist, politician, political activist, human rights activist, and cultural entrepreneur. She was the founder of the Caracas Athenaeum, a leading cultural institution which promotes the arts of Caracas. She also served as the president of Caracas Athenaeum from 1958 until her death in 2012. Castillo, a proponent of human rights, also played a major role in the formation of Amnesty International's Venezuelan chapter in 1978.

== Biography ==
María Teresa Castillo was born on October 15, 1908, in a hacienda, called "Bagre," in Cúa, Miranda State, Venezuela. She graduated from the School of Social Communications at the Central University of Venezuela.

In 1934, Castillo emigrated to New York, United States, where he worked in a factory as a seamstress. After she tried to stay in this country but their efforts are futile because she was syndicated as a revolutionary.

In 1989, she was elected to the Venezuelan Chamber of Deputies, the former lower house of the national legislature. As deputy, Castillo served as the first President of the Chamber's Permanent Commission on Culture. She was also a member of the Chamber's Committee on Regional Development during her tenure.

Castillo married Venezuelan journalist, Miguel Otero Silva, in 1946. They had two children, Miguel Henrique Otero, the current editor of El Nacional newspaper, and Mariana.

== Death and legacy ==
María Teresa Castillo died in Caracas on June 22, 2012, at the age of 103.

In Salou, Catalan province of Tarragona, there is a street named after Maria Castillo. The street is called Carrer de Maria Castillo.

== See also ==
- Politics of Venezuela
- Los Notables
