= La Encrucijada, Venezuela =

Transport site in Venezuela

La Encrucijada, or La Encrucijada de Turmero, is a locality near Turmero, Venezuela. There is a park named after Agustín Codazzi, but La Encrucijada is best known as the location of a strategic road junction. The locality is also planned to be the site of a rail junction.

== Road ==
At this point, about 72 km south-west of Caracas, the Autopista Regional del Centro (Central Regional Highway) intersects with other major highways. A toll booth (Peaje La Encrucijada) regulates access.

== Rail ==
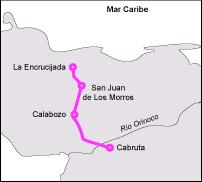
A line to the River Orinoco, one of the projected rail routes from La Encrucijada

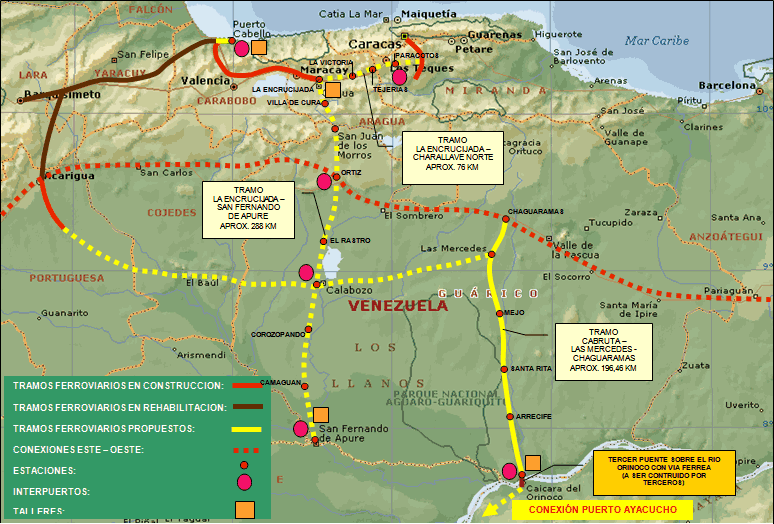
Projected lines in Venezuela including a junction at La Encrucijada

Turmero had a station on the Great Venezuela Railway between Caracas and Valencia. This line opened in the 1890s and closed in the 1960s.

With the revival of rail transport in Venezuela, La Encrucijada is planned to be the site of an important rail junction. Some construction has taken place on a line between La Encrucijada and the Caribbean at Puerto Cabello. This is a mainly east-west route which roughly follows the two 19th-century railway lines, now defunct, which linked the Valencia area to the coast. The next stage was planned to be lines into the interior of Venezuela and also to Caracas via Charallave where there is a line inaugurated in 2006.

There is evidence of site preparation at La Encrucijada. However, construction appears to have come to a halt. In 2016 the Financial Times reported that investments in the Venezuelan rail system had become risky.
