= Charallave =

- Santa Rosa de Lima de Charallave
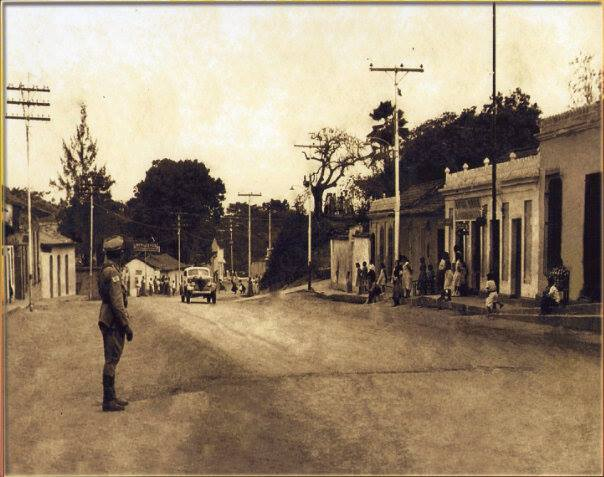
- Charallave in 1957

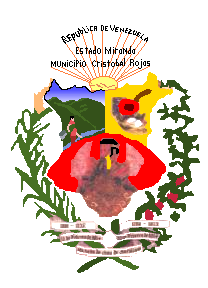
- Coat of arms

- Location within Venezuela
- Coordinates: 10°14′35″N 66°51′44″W
- Country: Venezuela
- State: Miranda
- Municipality: Cristóbal Rojas Municipality
- Founded: 1681
- Elevation: 315 m (1,033 ft)

Population (2001)
  - Total: 129,214
  - Demonym: Charallavenses
- Time zone: VST
- Postal code: 1210
- Area code: 0239
- Climate: Aw
- Website: www.charallave.gov.ve

Charallave is a city in the state of Miranda, Venezuela, and part of Miranda's Valles del Tuy region. It is the capital of Cristóbal Rojas Municipality. The name derives from the local Charavares indigenous people found at the time the city was founded.

== Transport ==
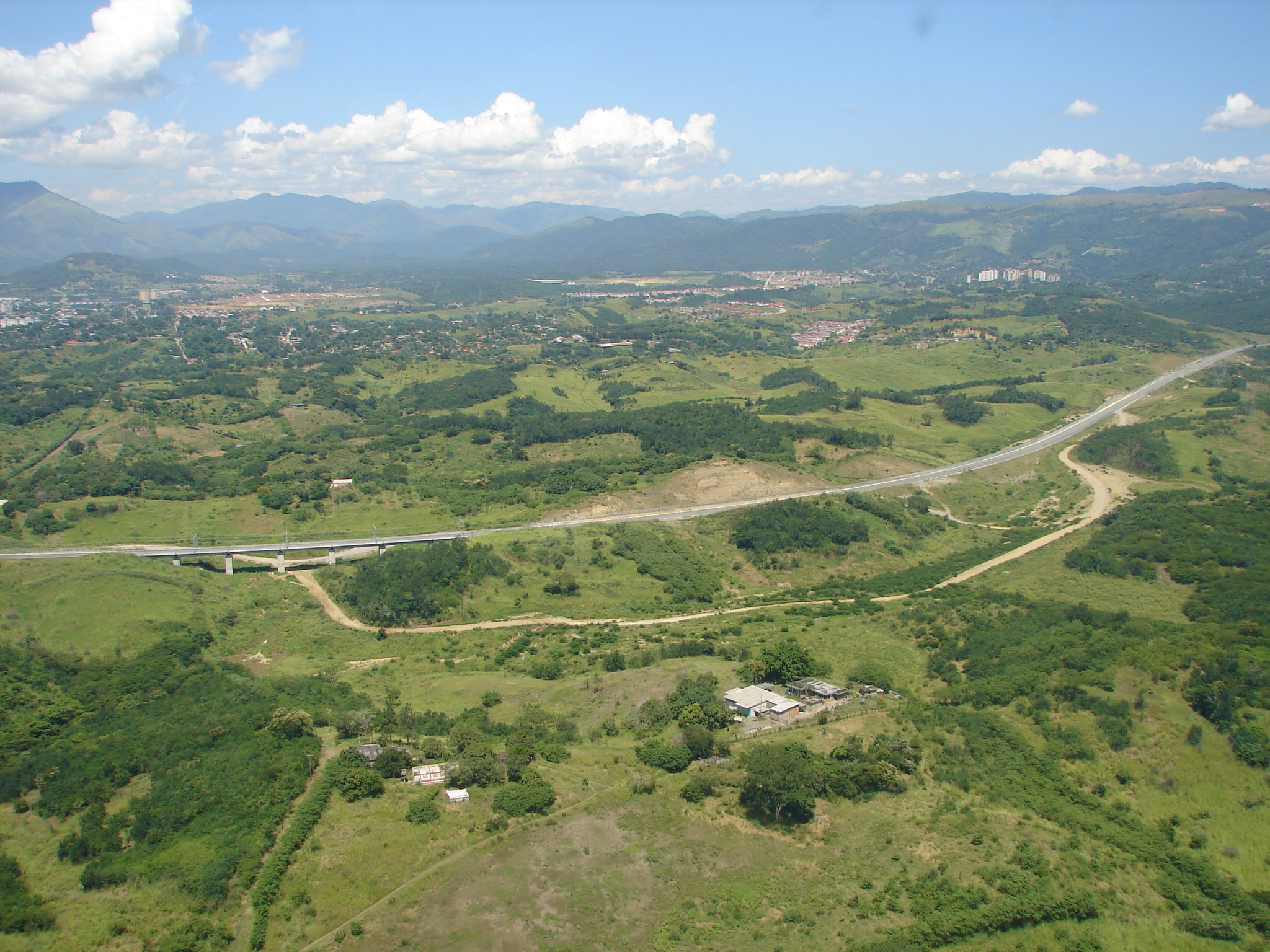

The city is on the electrified railway line which runs from Cúa to the Libertador Simón Bolívar Terminal in Caracas. The 40 km line was inaugurated in 2006, by President Hugo Chávez. Charallave has two train stations, Charallave Norte (also known as Generalísimo Francisco de Miranda) and Charallave Sur (also known as Don Simón Rodríguez).

It is planned that there should be a long-distance train service with a 70 km-long line linking Charallave to a junction at La Encrucijada in Aragua state.
