= Valencia Municipality, Carabobo =

Valencia Municipality Municipio Valencia
- Municipality
- Flag Coat of arms

- Location in Carabobo

- Location in Venezuela
- Coordinates: 10°02′11″N 68°00′49″W
- Country: Venezuela
- State: Carabobo
- Municipal seat: Valencia

Government
  - Mayor: Dina Castillo Ortega (PSUV)

Area
  - Total: 811.4 km^{2} (313.3 sq mi)

Population (2011)
  - Total: 829,856
  - Density: 1,023/km^{2} (2,649/sq mi)
- Time zone: UTC−4 (VET)
- Area code(s): 0241

The Valencia Municipality is one of the 14 municipalities (municipios) that makes up the Venezuelan state of Carabobo and, according to the 2011 census by the National Institute of Statistics of Venezuela, the municipality has a population of 829,856. The city of Valencia is the shire town of the Valencia Municipality.

== History ==
The city of Valencia has been an active participant of Venezuela's history. Valencia was founded by Captain Alonso Díaz Moreno on March 25, 1555 — as the locals are proud of reminding visitors, eight years before Caracas. It was the first Spanish settlement in central Venezuela and its official name was Nuestra Señora de la Asunción de Nueva Valencia del Rey. The infamous conquistador Lope de Aguirre besieged the city in 1561. In 1677 it was raided by French pirates, who burnt down its City Hall, thus destroying many very important documents about the early settlement of Venezuela. The German scientist Alexander von Humboldt visited the city on his trip through the Americas. He reported that at the time of his visit the city had around 6000 to 7000 inhabitants. On June 24, 1821, the Battle of Carabobo was fought on the outskirts of the city, sealing the Independence of Venezuela from imperial Spanish rule.

=== Media ===
The main newspaper servicing Valencia is "The Carabobian" or "Diario El Carabobeño" . In May 2007, many universities in Venezuela, including within Valencia, held demonstrations protesting the non-renewal of the broadcast license of Venezuelan Television station, Radio Caracas Televisión (RCTV). RCTV has been at odds with Venezuelan president Hugo Chávez.

== Sites of interest ==
=== Art centers ===
- Ateneo de Valencia
- Teatro Municipal de Valencia

=== Museums ===
- Casa Páez
- Casa de los Celis, settlement of the Museum of Art and History and the Lisandro Alvarado Foundation.
- Museum of History and Anthropology
- Iturriza Palace, or Quinta Isabela, Museum of the city (Museo de la Ciudad).

=== Parks and points of interest ===
- Negra Hipólita Park or Fernand Peñalver Park
- Metropolitan Park (Parque Metropolitano)
- Valencia's Aquarium (Acuario de Valencia) (ranks as largest aquarium in Latin America)
- Plaza Monumental de Valencia, second largest bullring in the world.

== Demographics ==
The Valencia Municipality, according to a 2007 population estimate by the National Institute of Statistics of Venezuela, has a population of 830,420 (up from 756,605 in 2000). This amounts to 37.3% of the state's population. The municipality's population density is 1,332.94 inhabitants per square kilometre (3,452.3/sq mi).

== Government ==
The mayor of the Valencia Municipality is Edgardo Parra, elected on November 23, 2008 with 38% of the vote. He replaced Francisco Cabrera Santos shortly after the elections. The municipality is divided into nine parishes:

- Candelaria
- Catedral
- El Socorro
- Miguel Peña Parish
- Rafael Urdaneta
- San Blas
- San José
- Santa Rosa
- Negro Primero

== Transportation ==
The city is well connected with the rest of the country by a network of highways and roads well maintained by INVIAL.

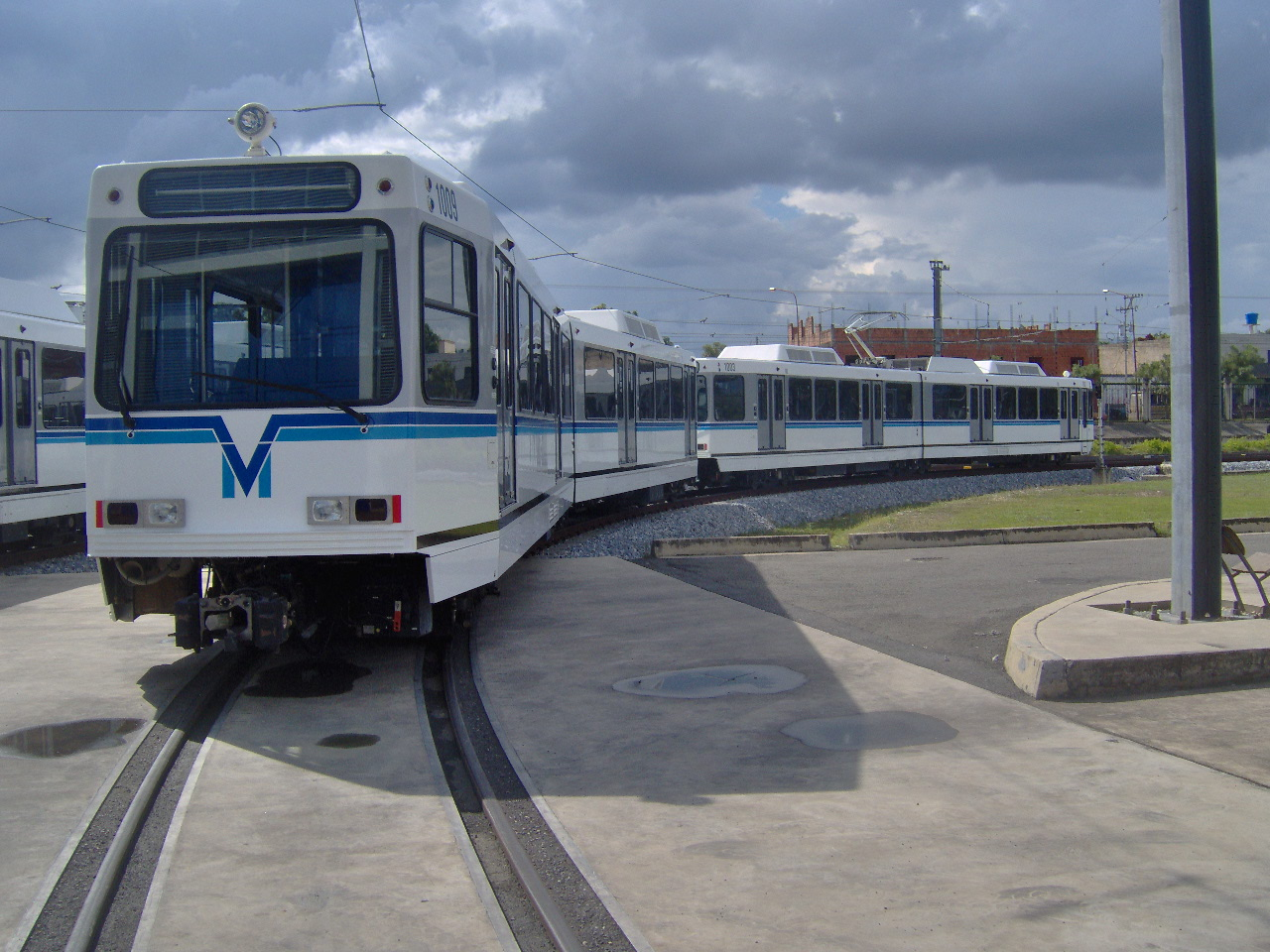
Metro de Valencia

A modern metro system is being constructed that will connect the city's remote suburbs with the downtown area.

- Buses are the main means of mass transportation. There are two bus systems: the traditional system and the VALBUS. The traditional system runs a variety of bus types, operated by several companies on normal streets and avenues:

- bus; large buses.
- buseta; medium size buses.
- microbus or colectivo; vans or minivans.

- The airport, Arturo Michelena International Airport (SVVA), is the nation's third busiest. It is served by all major Venezuelan airlines.

== Sister cities ==
Valencia is twinned with:

Naples, Italy
Valencia, Spain
Sibiu, Romania
Naguanagua, Venezuela
Plovdiv, Bulgaria

== See also ==
- Valencia
- Carabobo
- Municipalities of Venezuela
