= Miguel Peña (politician) =

Venezuelan politician (1781-1833)

Miguel Peña (1781, Valencia, Carabobo - 1833) was a Venezuelan politician. He was active in the Venezuelan War of Independence and was a signatory to Venezuela's first constitution. He is buried in the National Pantheon of Venezuela.

Miguel Peña Parish in Valencia, Carabobo is named for him.
