= El Prieto =

Venezuelan rapper (born 1982)

Arvei Angulo Rivas
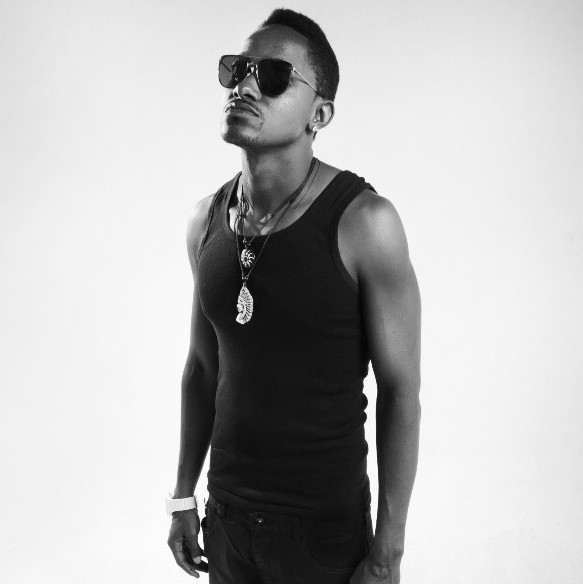

Background information
- Also known as: Colombia Gang; El Prieto; Prieto Beretta; Colombia
- Born: Arvei Angulo Rivas; April 13, 1982 (age 44); Valencia, Venezuela
- Genres: Rap, hip hop
- Occupation: Rapper
- Instrument: voice
- Years active: 1996–present
- Labels: Subterráneo Records, Flow Mafia Mucho Rap C.A

Arvei Angulo Rivas (born April 13, 1982 in Valencia, Venezuela), known as El Prieto, is a rapper, songwriter and producer of Venezuelan hip hop.

== Career ==
=== Guerrilla Seca and first solo album ===
Rivas was born in Valencia, Venezuela on April 13, 1982. Raised in the violent, crime-ridden slums of Petare, Rivas' experiences of living there has served as inspiration for his music.

El Prieto began his career as a rapper shortly after returning from Colombia to Venezuela. After meeting Rekeson in a nightclub and doing a freestyle with him, they decided to form a rap duo, and that's where Guerrilla Seca (GCK) was born. Rekeson and Prieto Beretta (then known as Colombia), were dedicated to improvise in the streets, where they caught the attention of Juan Carlos Echeandia, who hired them for Subterráneo Records, where they made their first record with other underground rap groups, called Venezuela Subterránea.

After three years, they decided to release another record, and from the hand of Subterráneo Records the second (First solo) disc of Guerrilla Seca was born, which they called La Realidad Más Real (The Most Real Reality), it was quite famous, making them known practically in all of Venezuela, and urging rap to be popularized.

In 2006, three years after the success of La Realidad Más Real, El Prieto and Rekeson had some personal problems and decided to release two albums alone, but at the same time and under the name of GCK so as not to damage the duo. This is how Yo Contra el Mundo (Me Against the World) and Jugando Vivo (Playing Live) were born. Yo Contra el Mundo was criticized a lot by the fans of the duo, the opposite of Rekeson's work, which was positively received. But their differences would not last long because two years later they would already be working on their new album.

Also known for his strong differences between his exmanager Juan Carlos Echeandia of the record company Subterráneo Records and the deceased singer, Mc Ardilla. Were the most talked among other conflicts in the genre, breaking through other singers.

In 2008, they decided to release Libre Pero Preso (Free But Jailed), this time as a duo again, without the help of Subterráneo Records, with whom they had some differences. The album was very accepted by the fans, but its success did not last long because one year later El Prieto and Rekeson had differences again, which caused them to separate definitively and culminate with the Guerrilla Seca project, leaving many fans disappointed. However, Rekeson continued to work on his side, as El Prieto did.

=== Solo career ===
More than 1 million visits has the video "Petare barrio de Pakistán" (Petare Neighborhood Of Pakistan), part I, on YouTube.

== Discography ==
=== Guerrilla Seca ===
- La Realidad Más Real (2002)
- Jugando Vivo (2006)
- Libre Pero Preso (2008)

=== Solo ===
- Yo Contra el Mundo (2006)
- Al Desnudo (2010)
- Mucho Rap Mixtape (2012)
- Puro Oro Negro (2013)
- Libro (2013)
- Pandillero Mixtape (2014)
- Hasta Después de la Muerte (2018)
- El Papá del Hip Hop Venezolano (2018)
- Inédito (2018)
- Internacionales (2018)
- Clásico (2018)
- Guetto (2018)
- Trapstar (2018)
- Arvei Angulo Rivas A. A. R. (2020)
- Arvei Angulo Rivas (2020)
- Drill Music (2021)
- Fakeson la Reina del Arroz con Pollo Q. E. P. D. (2026)
