= Valencia, Venezuela =

Valencia
- City
- Nuestra Señora de la Asunción de la Nueva Valencia del Rey
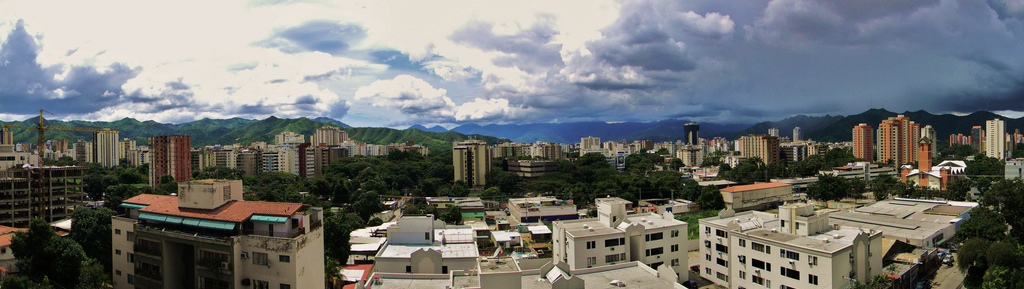
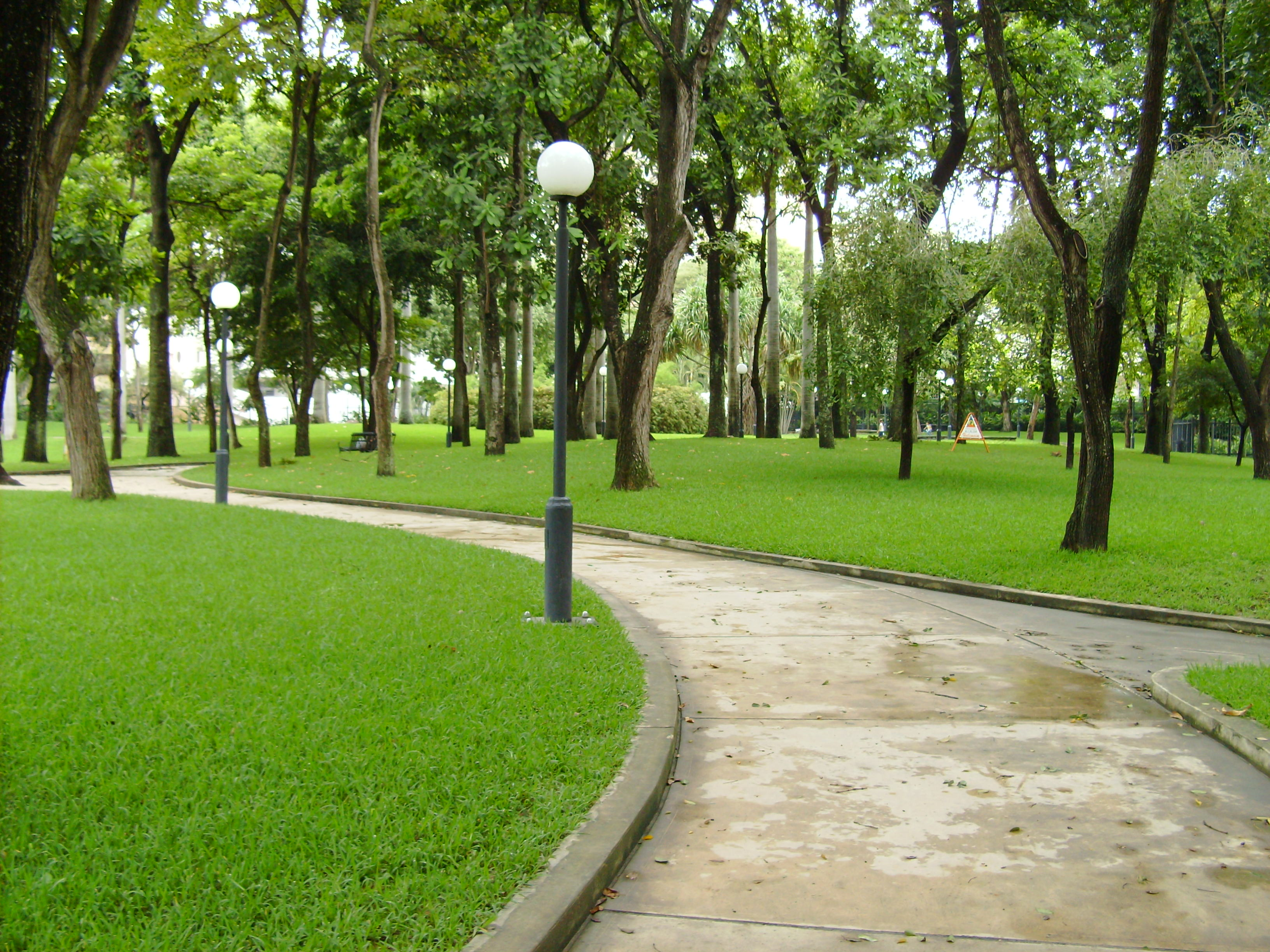
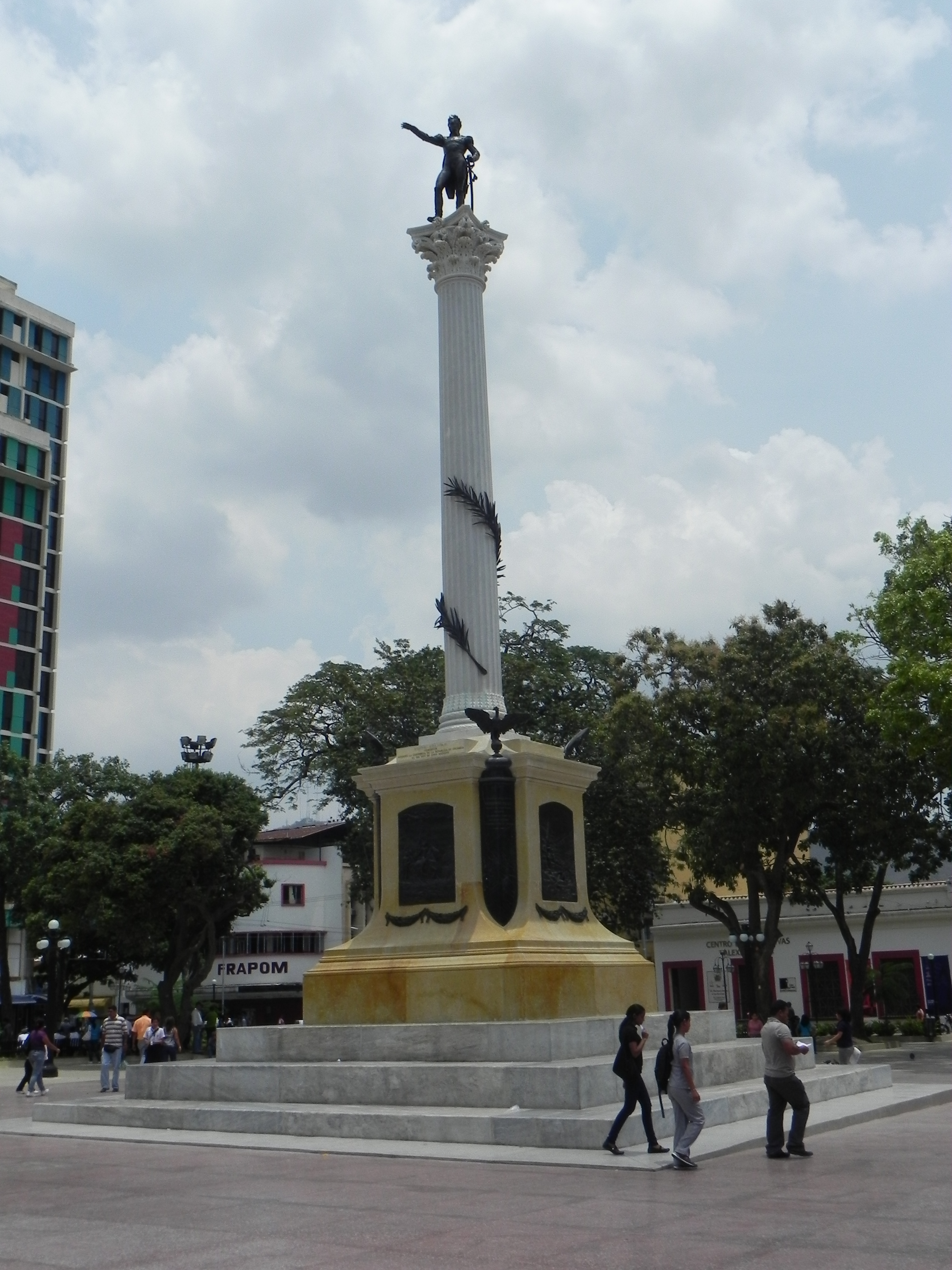
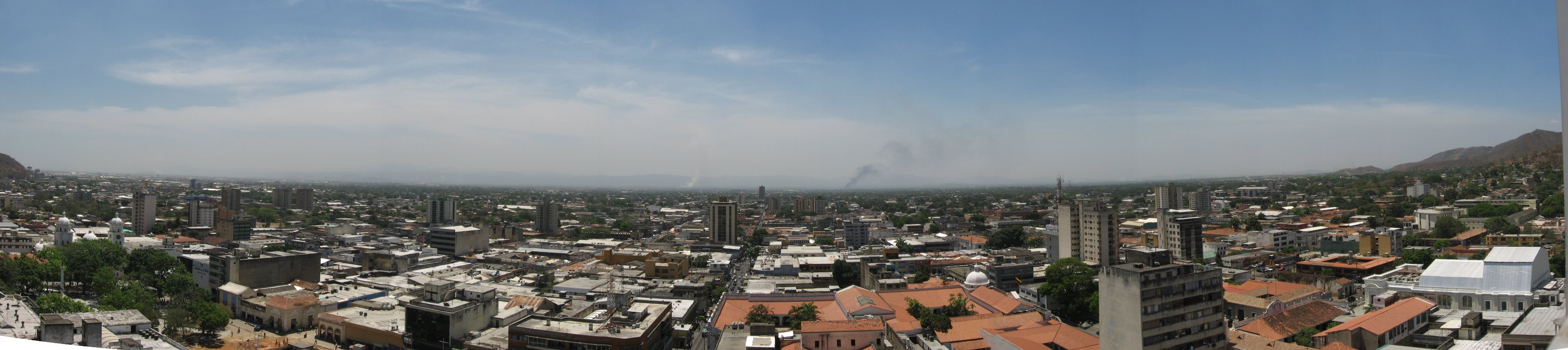
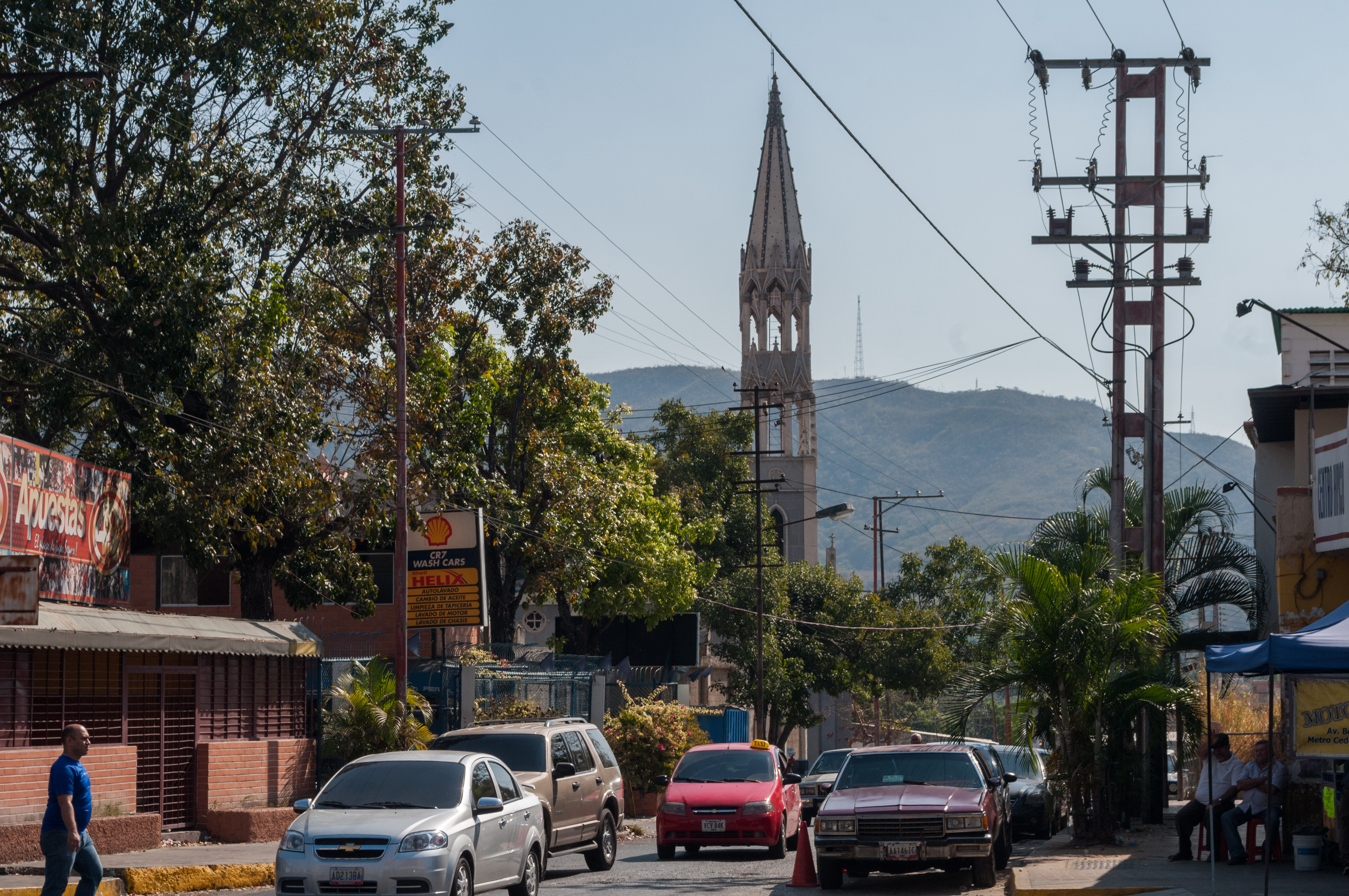
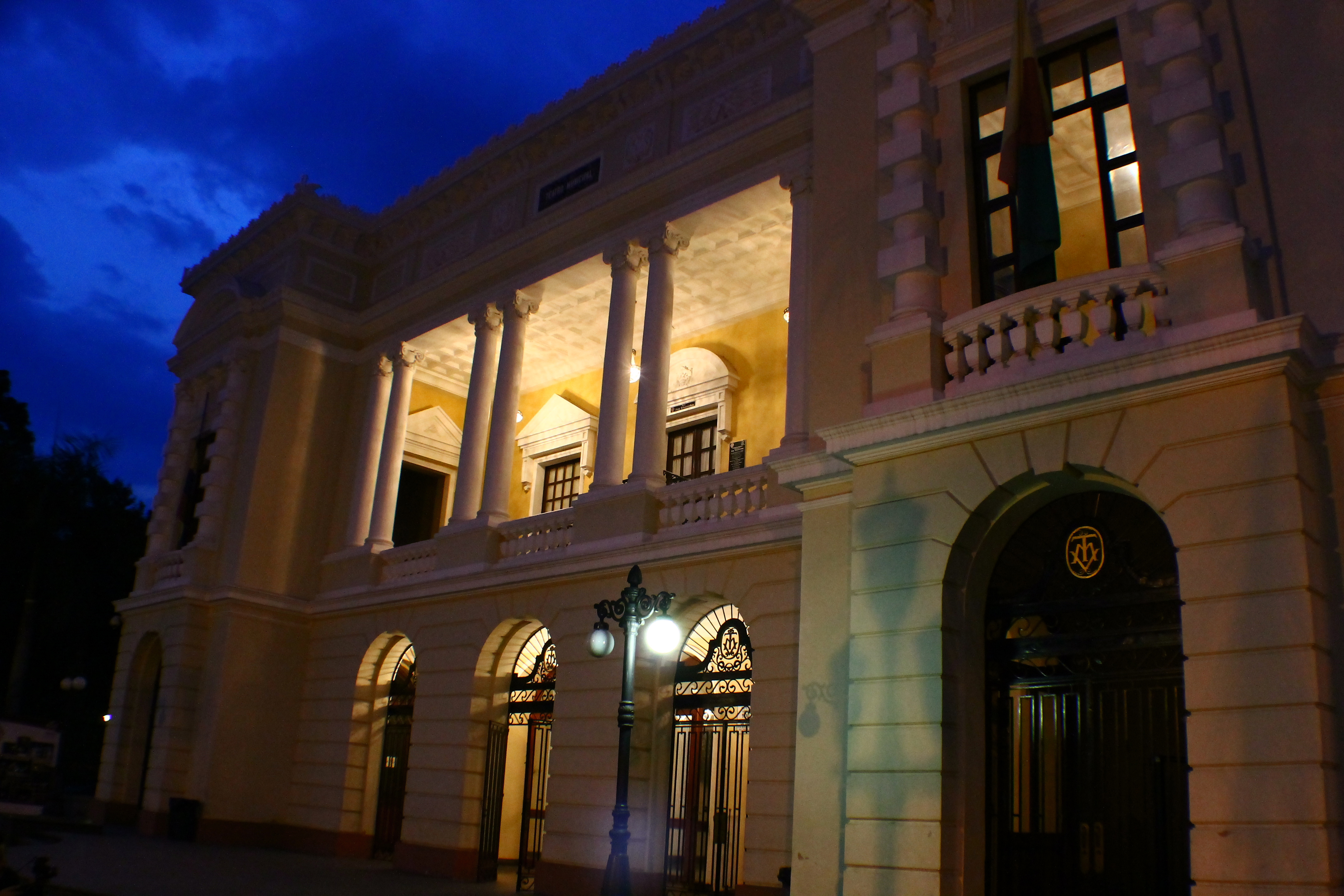
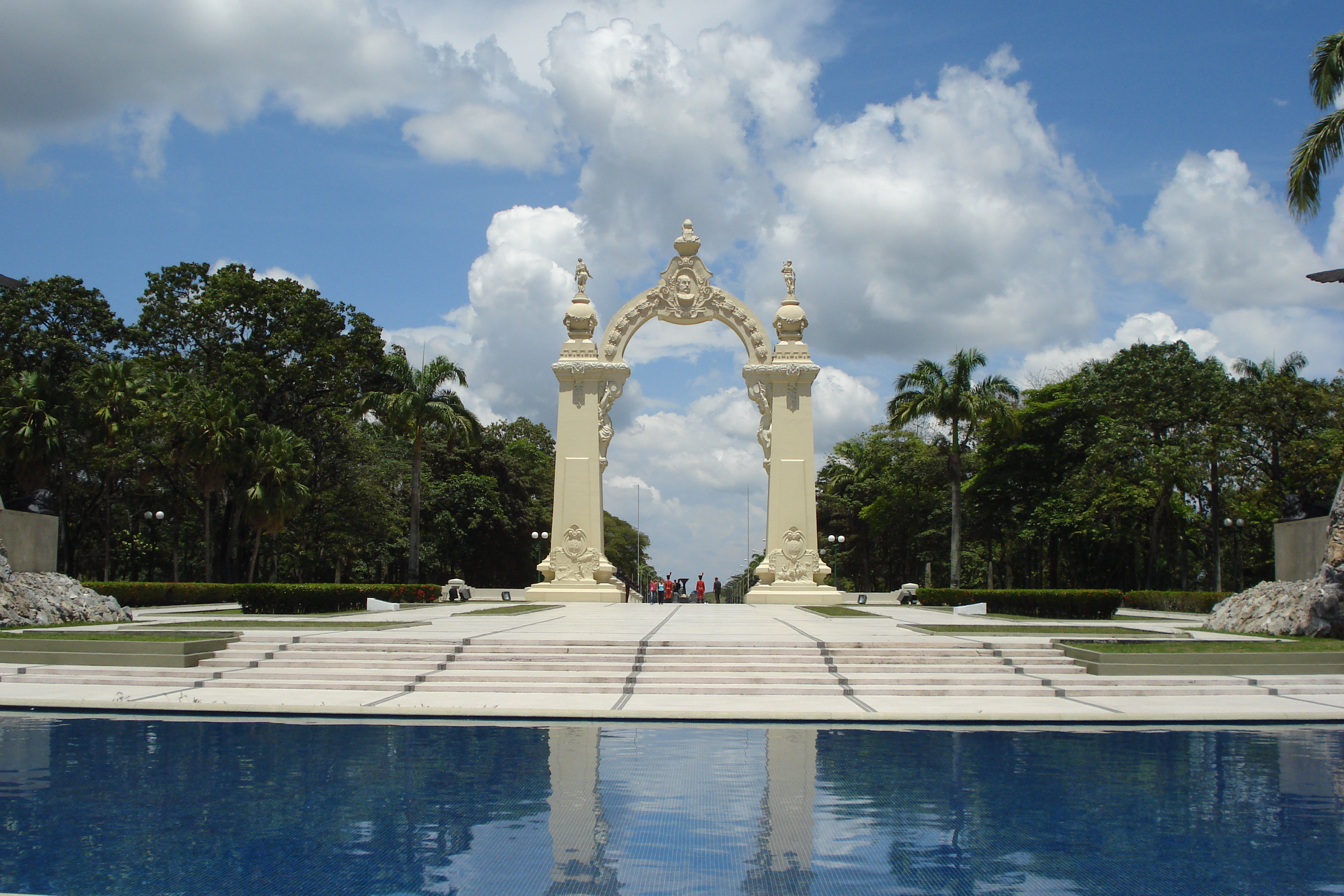
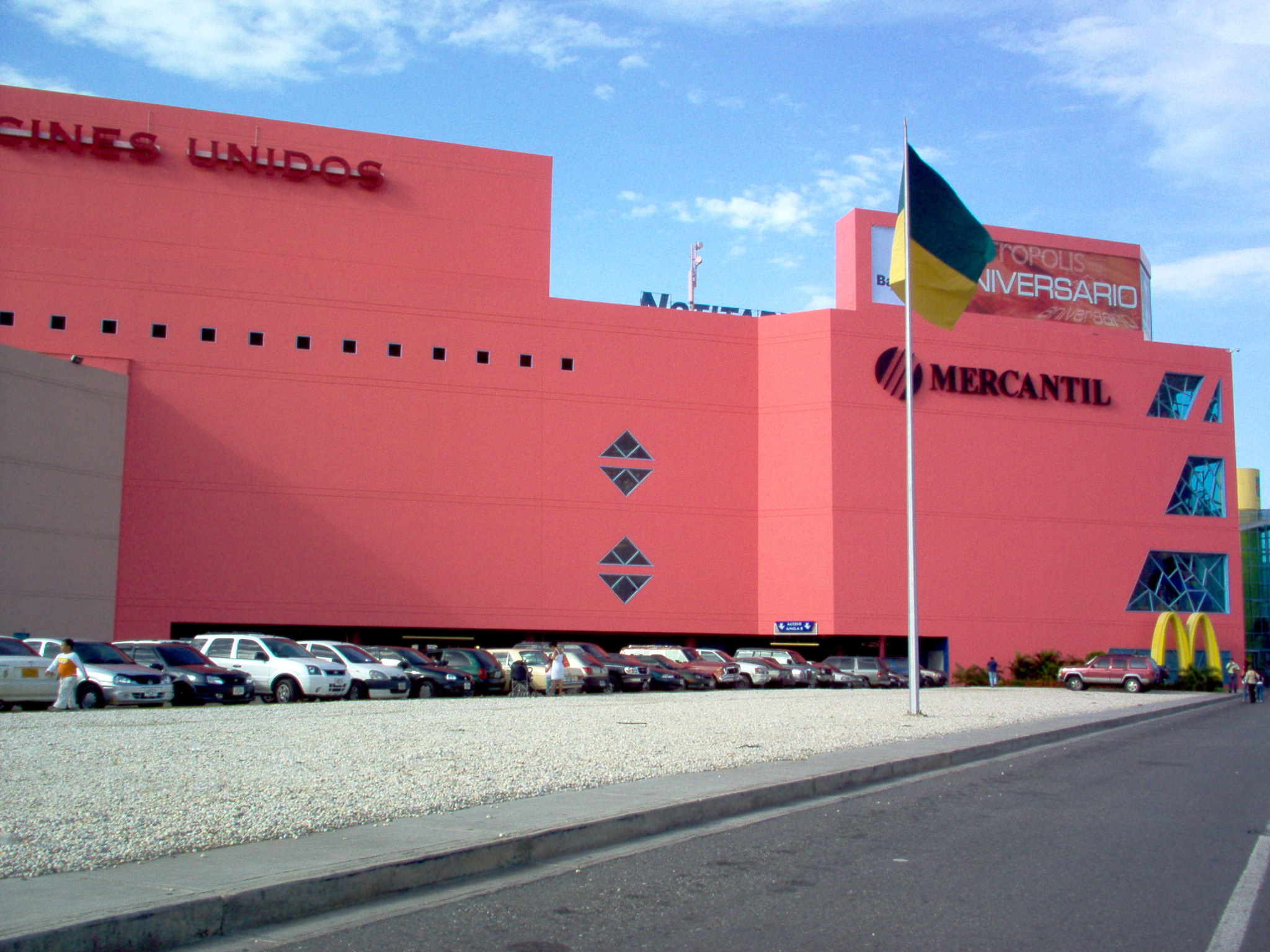
- Top to bottom, left to right: Panoramic View of Valencia; Urb Prebo Park; Bolívar Square of Valencia; Panoramic View of the south of Valencia; Street in Valencia; Municipal Theatre of Valencia; Arch of Carabobo; Metrópolis Mall

- Flag Coat of arms
- Etymology: Valencia de Don Juan
- Nicknames: Capital industrial de Venezuela, La pequeña Detroit (The little Detroit), La ciudad de las naranjas, La ciudad de las mujeres hermosas, Valencia señorial
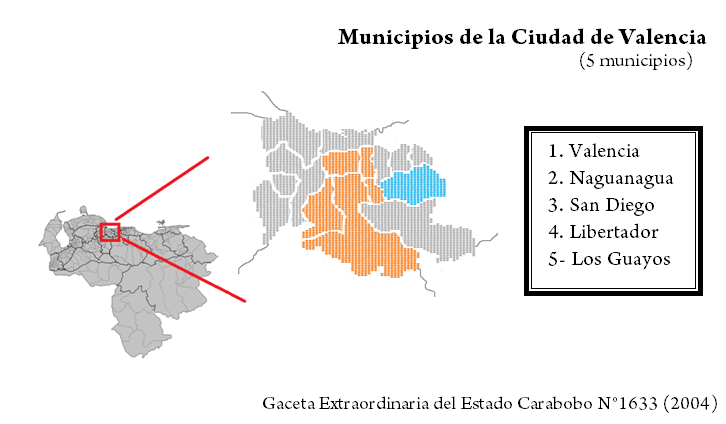
- Municipalities of Valencia

- Location within Venezuela Location within the Caribbean
- Coordinates: 10°11′N 68°00′W
- Country: Venezuela
- State: Carabobo
- Municipality: Valencia; Libertador; Los Guayos; Naguanagua; San Diego
- Founded: March 25, 1555

Area^{*}
  - City: 1,548 km^{2} (598 sq mi)
- Elevation: 520 m (1,710 ft)

Population (2021)
  - City: 1,619,470
  - Rank: 3rd
  - Density: 1,700/km^{2} (4,300/sq mi)
  - Urban: 1,958,724
  - Metro: 2,031,000
- Demonym: Valenciano(a)
- Time zone: UTC−4 (VET)
- Postal code: 2001
- Area code: 0241
- Climate: Aw
- Website: alcaldiadevalencia.gob.ve

Valencia (Spanish pronunciation: [baˈlensja]) is the capital city of Carabobo State and the third-largest city in Venezuela.

The city is an economic hub that contains Venezuela's top industries and manufacturing companies. It is also the largest city in the Valencia-Maracay metropolitan region, which with a population of about 4.5 million is the country's second largest after that of Caracas. Caracas lies some 172 kilometres (107 miles) away to the east.

== History ==
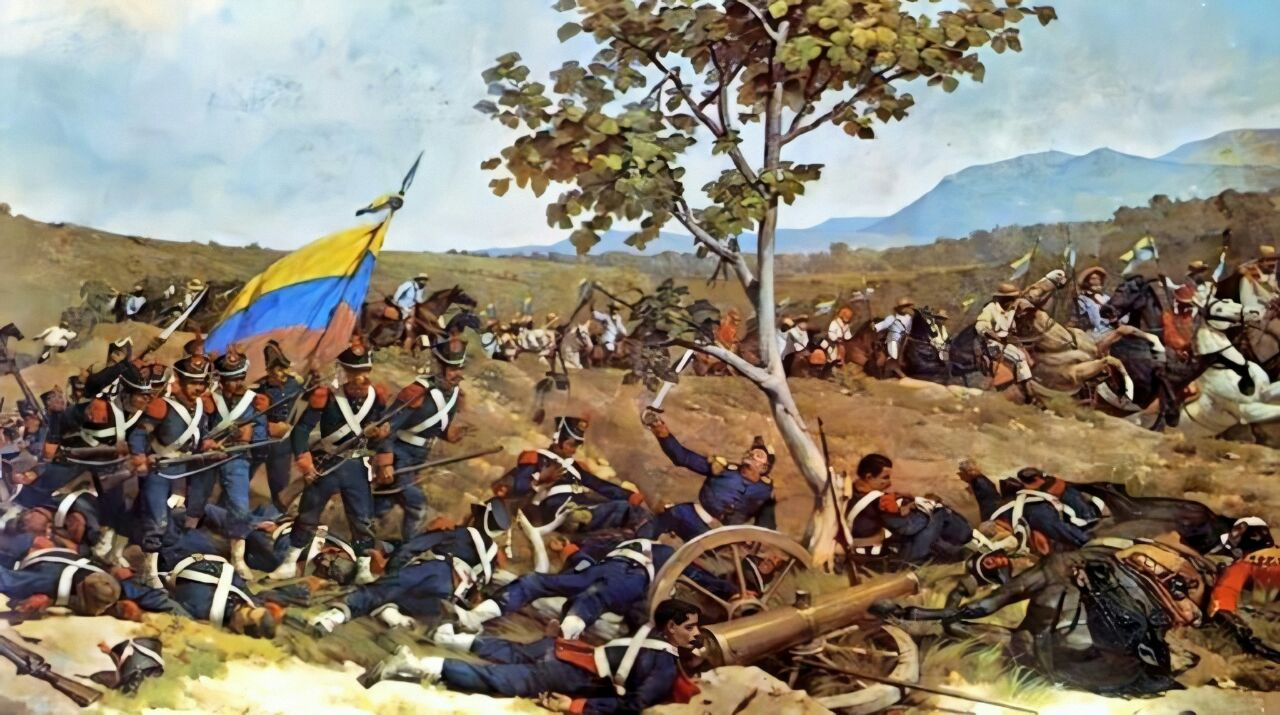
Battle of Carabobo in 1821

The area was already inhabited in the fourth millennium BC. The inhabitants were mainly hunters and gatherers who might have already developed some elementary forms of agriculture. Between AD 200 and 1000, an important settlement was formed close to Lake Valencia.

Around the year 1000, waves of migration started to come from the Orinoco river area, probably arriving along the Pao river. The fusion of previous settlements with these new populations gave rise to the Valencioide culture.

People in the area belonged mostly to Arawak groups. They were hunters and gatherers who also fished and grew maize and cotton. Their houses were built on artificial mounds in valleys that were often flooded by water from Lake Valencia.

Archaeologists have found mostly pottery from that time. Valencia was founded by Captain Alonso Díaz Moreno on March 25, 1555 – as the locals are proud of reminding visitors, eight years before Caracas. It was the first Spanish settlement in north-central Venezuela and its official name was Nuestra Señora de la Asunción de Nueva Valencia del Rey. It was named after Valencia de Don Juan, Province of León, Spain. The encomiendas put the Indians living in the region under the control of the Spanish settlers. They started to displace the native population from the most fertile land, but they also started intermarrying with them.

Spanish conquistador Lope de Aguirre entered the city in 1561. In 1677, it was raided by French pirates, who burnt down its City Hall, thus destroying many very important documents about the early settlement of Venezuela. The German scientist Alexander von Humboldt visited the city on his trip through the Americas. He reported that at the time of his visit the city had around 6,000 to 7,000 inhabitants. On June 24, 1821, the battle of Carabobo was fought near the city, sealing the independence of Venezuela from imperial Spanish rule. Valencia became the capital of Venezuela in 1830, after it separated from Gran Colombia. It ceased to be the capital soon afterward, becoming once more the seat of the national government in 1858 after the Monagas brothers were toppled and the March Revolution took place. On November 15, 1892, the University of Valencia, future University of Carabobo, was founded.

When dictator Juan Vicente Gómez died in 1935, Nueva Valencia del Rey was a small city. The oil revenues and industrialization that came along lead to a population explosion. Many immigrants, firstly from Europe and increasingly then from other Latin American countries, chose Nueva Valencia del Rey as the place to live in Venezuela.

The first direct election of local governments (including those of the mayor and of the state's government) took place in 1988.

Valencia was one of the places where Hugo Chávez's proposal for the constitutional reform was rejected with the highest proportion of votes: around 59.21% of the population rejected it.

== Geography ==
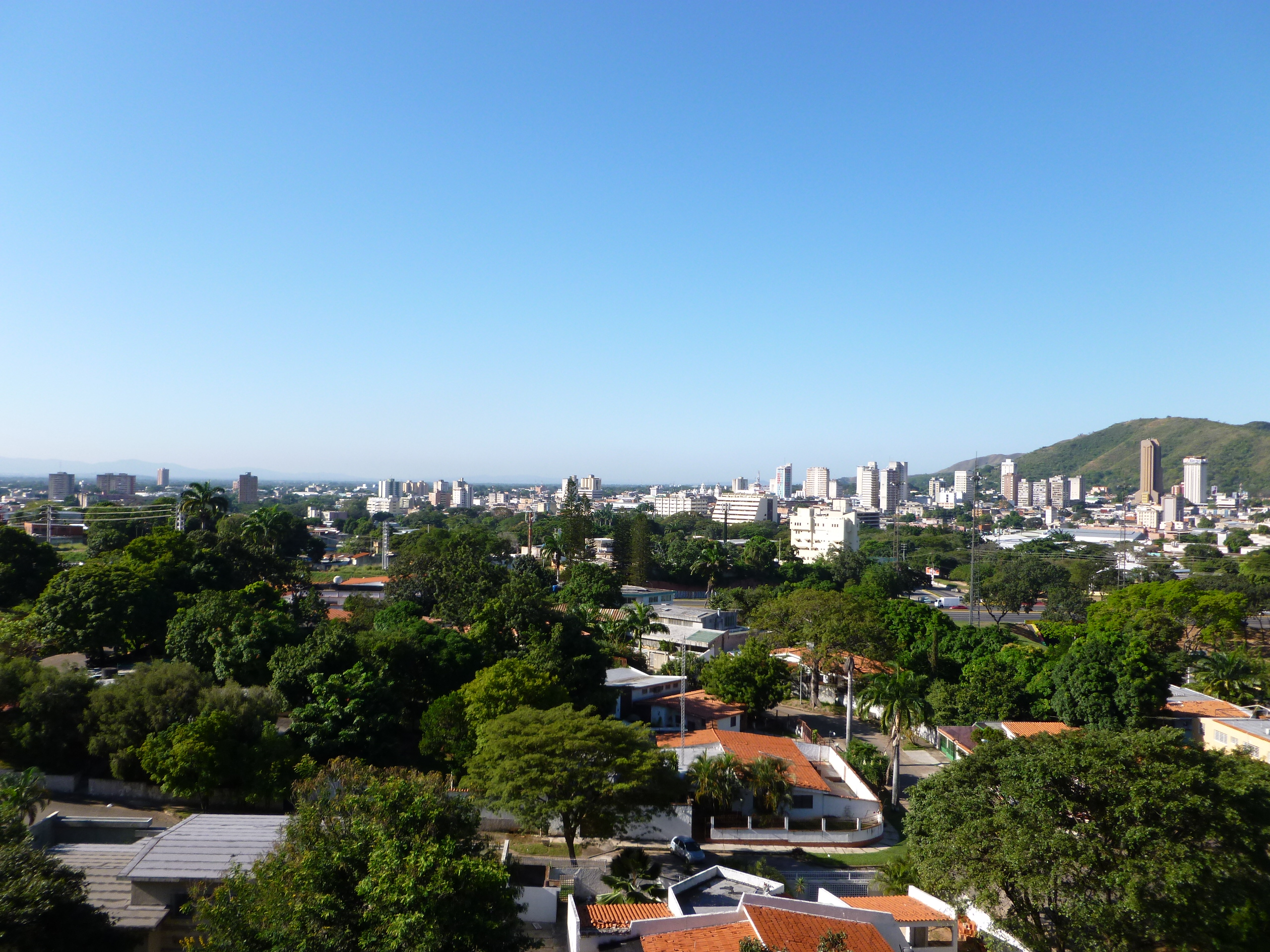
View of Valencia from Lomas del Este.

Valencia is located in a central valley, surrounded by a mountain range called the Coastal Range (Cordillera de la Costa). On the eastern outskirts of the city lies Lake Valencia, Venezuela's second-largest lake. To the West and Northeastern part there are mountains. To the south is an extension of the Venezuelan grasslands, the Llanos.

The elevation of the city is 520 metres (1,710 feet).

=== Climate ===
Valencia has a tropical savanna climate (Köppen: Aw). The city experiences a distinct wet season from May to November. The dry season extends from December to April, with significantly lower precipitation. Valencia, due to its latitude and closeness to the sea, has relatively warm temperatures. The yearly average is 26 °C (79 °F), (23.3 °C (73.9 °F) in the shade, a maximum of 32.6 °C (90.7 °F) and minimum of 18.5 °C (65.3 °F)). The city is located 479 metres (1,572 feet) above sea level. Winds reduce the temperature in the afternoon.

Climate data for Valencia (Arturo Michelena International Airport) (1991–2020)
Month	Jan	Feb	Mar	Apr	May	Jun	Jul	Aug	Sep	Oct	Nov	Dec	Year
Record high °C (°F)	37.1 (98.8)	39.3 (102.7)	38.9 (102.0)	38.7 (101.7)	38.1 (100.6)	35.5 (95.9)	35.6 (96.1)	35.6 (96.1)	36.2 (97.2)	36.0 (96.8)	37.6 (99.7)	36.4 (97.5)	39.3 (102.7)
Mean daily maximum °C (°F)	32.3 (90.1)	32.8 (91.0)	33.5 (92.3)	33.2 (91.8)	32.5 (90.5)	31.5 (88.7)	31.1 (88.0)	31.0 (87.8)	31.8 (89.2)	32.0 (89.6)	32.1 (89.8)	32.2 (90.0)	32.2 (90.0)
Daily mean °C (°F)	24.9 (76.8)	25.3 (77.5)	26.1 (79.0)	26.4 (79.5)	26.3 (79.3)	25.5 (77.9)	24.9 (76.8)	24.8 (76.6)	25.2 (77.4)	25.4 (77.7)	25.5 (77.9)	25.3 (77.5)	25.5 (77.9)
Mean daily minimum °C (°F)	20.0 (68.0)	20.5 (68.9)	21.4 (70.5)	22.1 (71.8)	22.4 (72.3)	21.7 (71.1)	21.2 (70.2)	21.2 (70.2)	21.5 (70.7)	21.6 (70.9)	21.4 (70.5)	20.9 (69.6)	21.3 (70.3)
Record low °C (°F)	14.6 (58.3)	16.0 (60.8)	15.9 (60.6)	17.5 (63.5)	18.0 (64.4)	17.5 (63.5)	16.7 (62.1)	15.2 (59.4)	16.4 (61.5)	16.5 (61.7)	17.0 (62.6)	13.8 (56.8)	13.8 (56.8)
Average precipitation mm (inches)	55.1 (2.17)	32.5 (1.28)	26.4 (1.04)	71.8 (2.83)	116.0 (4.57)	135.9 (5.35)	183.1 (7.21)	187.1 (7.37)	185.1 (7.29)	194.9 (7.67)	130.6 (5.14)	86.0 (3.39)	1,404.5 (55.30)
Average precipitation days (≥ 1.0 mm)	2.3	1.5	2.1	6.0	9.1	12.5	14.3	14.6	12.3	12.1	7.8	3.9	98.5
Source: NOAA

=== Environment ===
The Cabriales river has problems with pollution. The most important waste disposal centre of Greater Valencia and Carabobo is located southwest of Valencia proper, in the Municipio Libertador, in La Guásima. There, waste is basically burnt without any special equipment.

== Government ==
The City of Valencia is made of five municipalities: Valencia, Libertador, Los Guayos, Naguanagua, and San Diego.

Venezuelan law specifies that every municipal government must have four main functions: executive, legislative, comptroller, and planning. The executive function is managed by the mayor of each municipality, who is in charge of representing the municipality's administration. The legislative branch is represented by the Municipal Council, composed of seven councillors for each municipality, charged with the deliberation of new decrees and local laws. The comptroller tasks are managed by the municipal comptroller's office, which oversees accountancy. Finally, planning is represented by the Local Public Planning Council, which manages development projects for the municipality.

== Media ==
The main newspapers of the region are El Carabobeño and Notitarde, with a circulation going from 75,000 to 92,000.

The main TV Stations in Valencia are Ecovisión (Channel 36 UHF) and DAT TV (Channel 30 UHF).

The private Digital Newspaper of Carabobo State is Agencia Carabobeña de Noticias (ACN).

== Education ==
The main centre of higher education in Nueva Valencia del Rey is the University of Carabobo, one of the most important public universities of Venezuela. The direction of the University and some administratives centres are located in the Valencia Municipality, whereas most of the buildings are currently in the Naguanagua of the same city.

Other institutions of higher education are the Universidad Tecnológica del Centro (UNITEC), Universidad Arturo Michelena (UAM), Universidad José Antonio Páez (UJAP), Universidad Alejandro de Humboldt (UAH), Universidad Experimental Politécnica de las Fuerzas Armadas (UNEFA) in La Isabelica, the Instituto Nacional de Capacitación y Educación (INCE) in Los Colorados, La Isabelica and La Quizanda.

== Sites of interest ==
=== Art centers ===
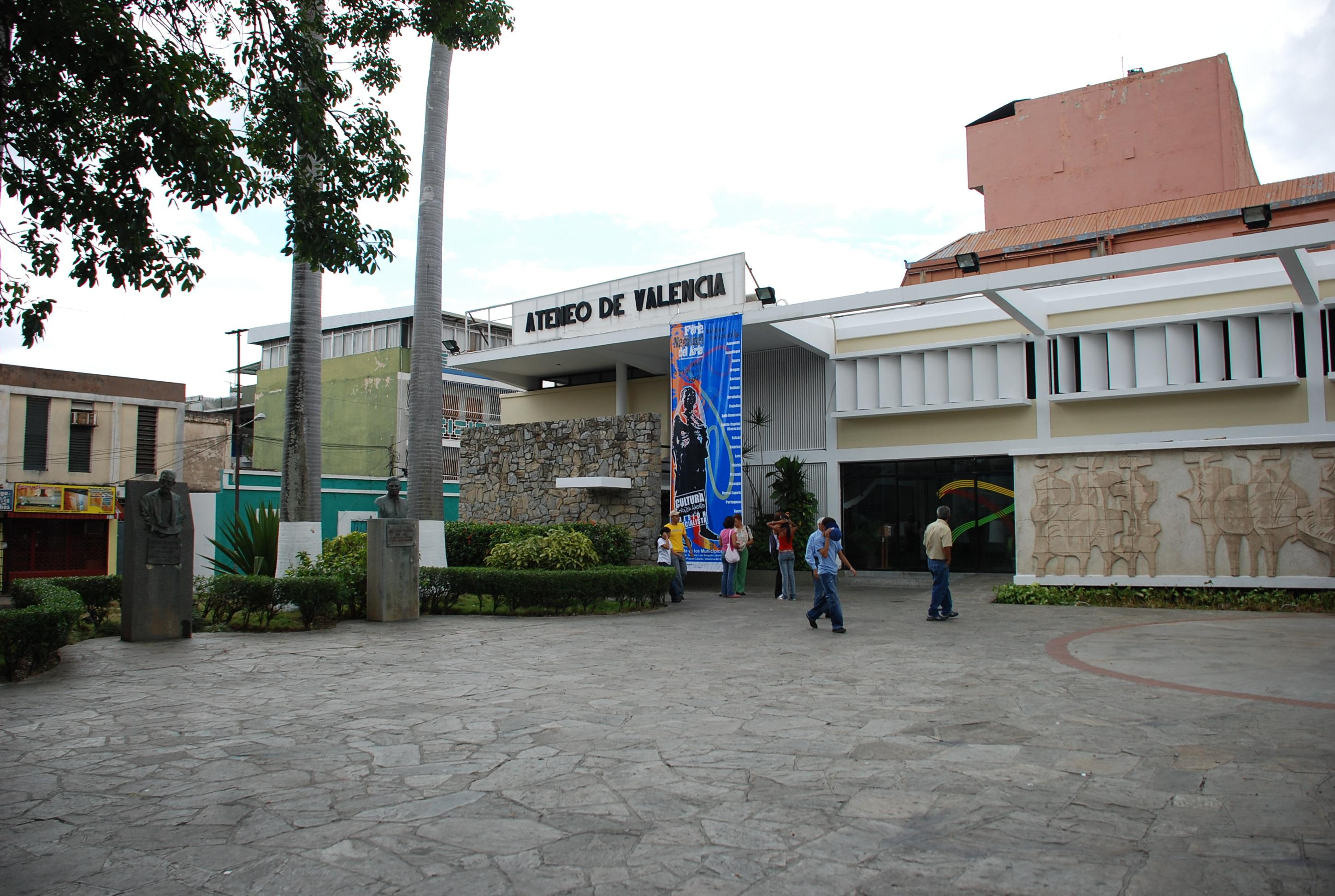
Atheneum of Valencia

- Valencia Atheneum: a cultural centre where concerts and art exhibitions regularly take place.
- Municipal Theater of Valencia: It is the main theatre of Carabobo. It was finished in 1895 following the architecture of French theatres of the time.
- Theater Dr. Alfredo Celis Perez: It is the main amphitheater of the University of Carabobo. A much larger events facility called Aula Magna is currently under construction.

=== Museums ===
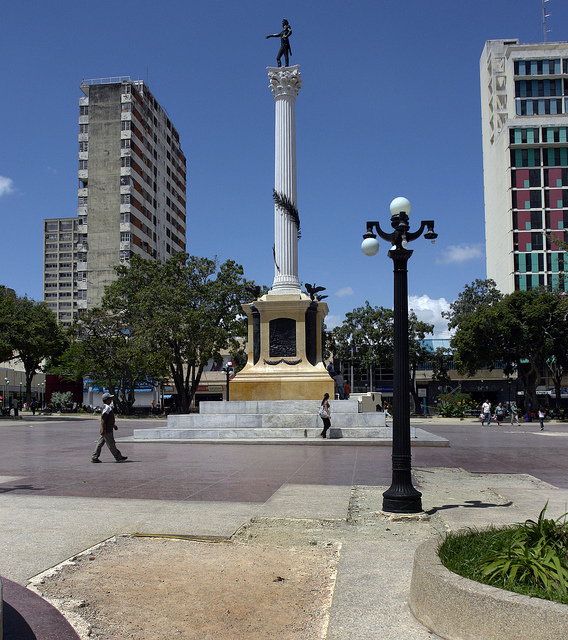
Bolívar Square in Valencia

- Páez Mansion: this is a mansion once owned by one of the first presidents of Venezuela and leader of the independence wars, José Antonio Páez. It is currently a small museum and has a historical library. Some of the paintings with scenes depicting independence wars were made by Pedro Castillo, the grandfather of a well-known Venezuelan painter, Arturo Michelena.
- Celis Mansion: this is a colonial house built in 1765. It is the seat of the Museum of Art and History and the Lisandro Alvarado Foundation.
- Museum of History and Anthropology: this museum contains an important collection of the pre-Columbian and colonial heritage of Venezuela.
- Iturriza Palace or Quinta Isabela: this has the Museum of the city (Museo de la Ciudad).
- Museum of Culture: this museum holds different temporary arts exhibitions.

=== Parks and points of interest ===
- The Plaza Bolívar is noted for its monumental column surmounted by a statue of Simón Bolívar.

The square dates back to the colonial period, and was renamed after Bolivar in the nineteenth century. In 1887, Antonio Guzmán Blanco the president of Venezuela, decided to remodel the square, erecting a monumental column. The project was also endorsed by General Hermógenes López, president of Carabobo State, who succeeded Guzmán Blanco as president of Venezuela.

- Negra Hipólita Park and Fernando Peñalver Park: a large park with gardens, concert halls, cultural centres and facilities for children to learn traffic rules and celebrate parties. The park surrounds the stream of the Cabriales River in the Northern part of the city. The whole park is divided: the east side is the Negra Hipólita Park, and the west side is the Fernando Peñalver Park.

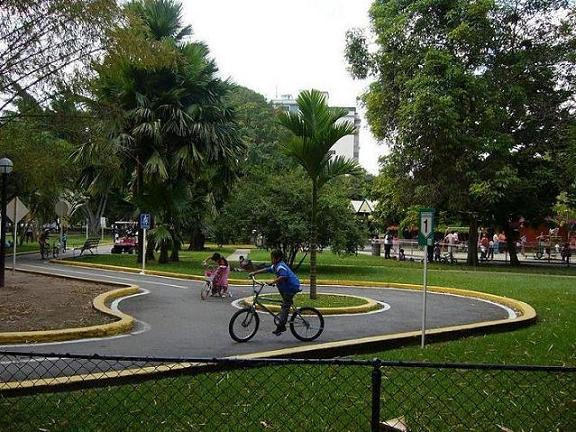
Children at the Fernando Peñalver Park learn traffic rules

- Valencia Metropolitan Park (Parque Metropolitano): a park on the Central part of the city with horses and large bird cages with a large variety of parrots. The park surrounds the stream of the Cabriales River in the Central part of the city.
- Humboldt Park (Parque Humboldt): a park on the Southern part of the city where the Museum of Culture is located. The park surrounds the stream of the Cabriales River in the Southern part of the city.
- Recreational Southern Park (Parque Recreacional Sur): a park on the Southern part of the city where the Bull Ring is located, but also an area used for many concerts and national and international festivals and exhibitions.
- Valencia Aquarium (Acuario de Valencia): Home to trained Amazon river dolphins, among many other species. It also contains also a serpentarium, a terrarium and a small zoo with many animals endemic to Venezuela. It also has some facilities for children to play.
- Plaza Monumental de Valencia: this is second largest bullring in the world and is located right in Valencia's Recreational Southern Park.
- Cerro Casupo Municipal Park: a natural park on the mountains, some 693 hectares big, to the Northwest of the city.

=== Libraries ===
The main public library in Valencia is the Manuel Feo La Cruz Public Library, located in the city centre and open daily. Other public libraries are the Public Library of the Athenaeum of Valencia and the Morita Carillo Public Library, in the San Blas civic parish.

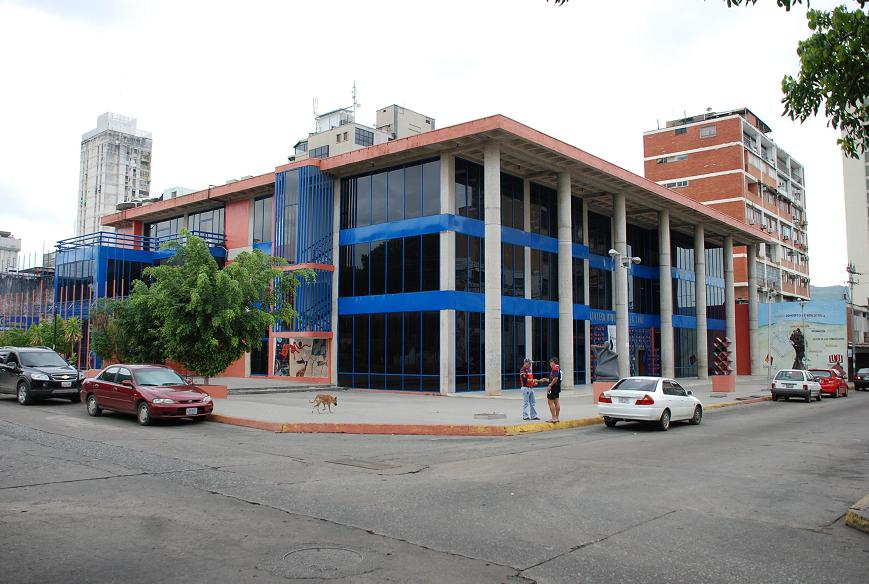
Manuel Feo La Cruz Public Library

== Transportation ==
The city is well connected with the rest of the country by a network of highways and roads maintained by INVIAL.

- Valencia boasts a modern train system, Metro de Valencia. The metro covers started in 2007. There are 9 stations from the Southern part of the city to the downtown area. More stations are under construction and more lines are in planning stage.
- Buses are the main means of mass transportation. There are two bus systems: the traditional system and the VALBUS. The traditional system runs a variety of bus types, operated by several companies on normal streets and avenues:
  - bus; large buses.
  - buseta; medium size buses.
  - microbus or colectivo; vans or minivans.
- The airport, Arturo Michelena International Airport, is the nation's third busiest. It is served by all major Venezuelan airlines, as well as by Copa Airlines of Panama, and by the Dominican Republic's Sky High Aviation Services.

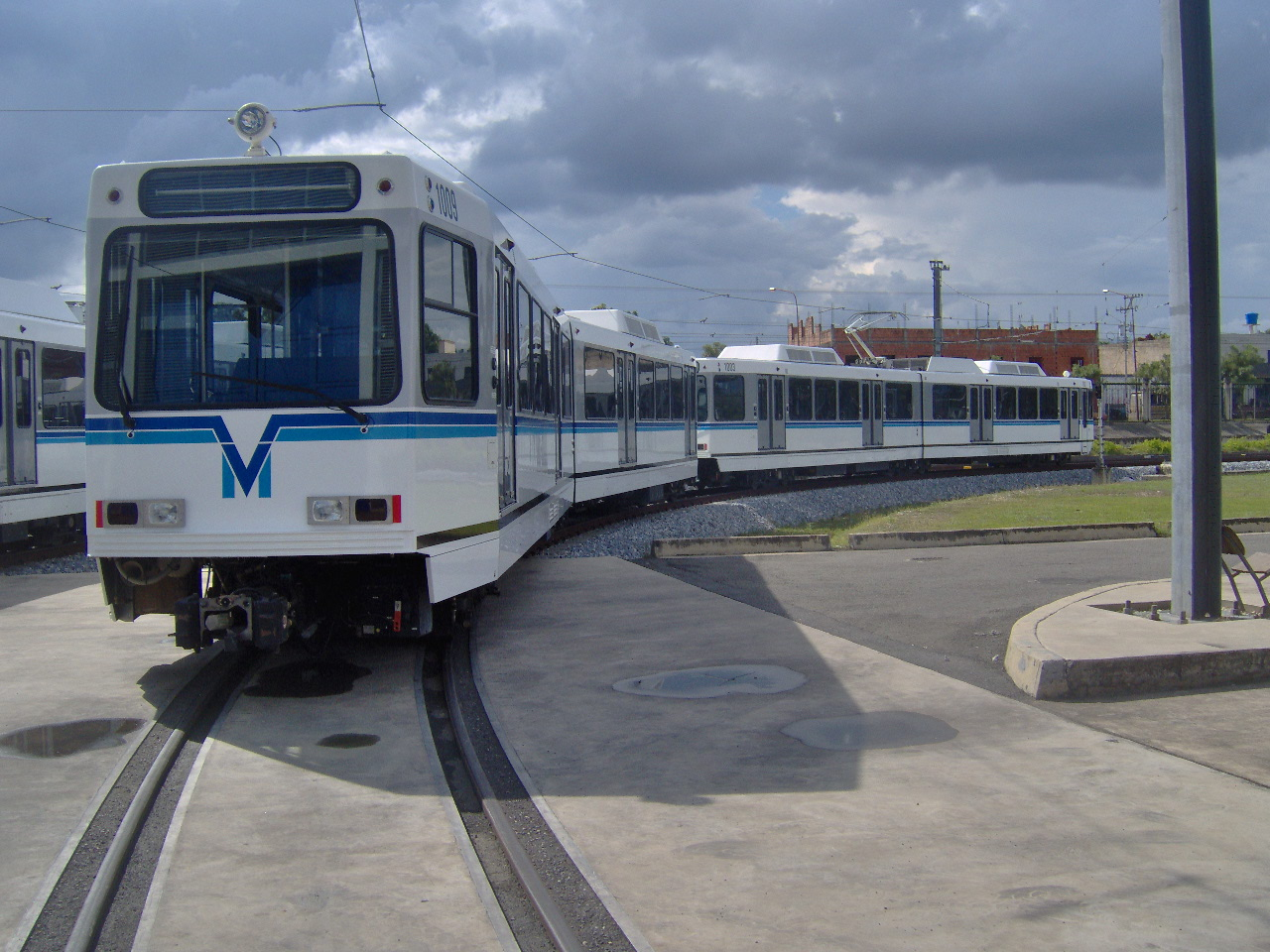
Metro de Valencia

== Sports ==
Valencia is home of the Venezuelan LVBP baseball team Navegantes del Magallanes.

Other professional teams include Trotamundos de Carabobo (LPB basketball), Carabobo FC (FVF soccer), and Industriales de Valencia (volleyball).

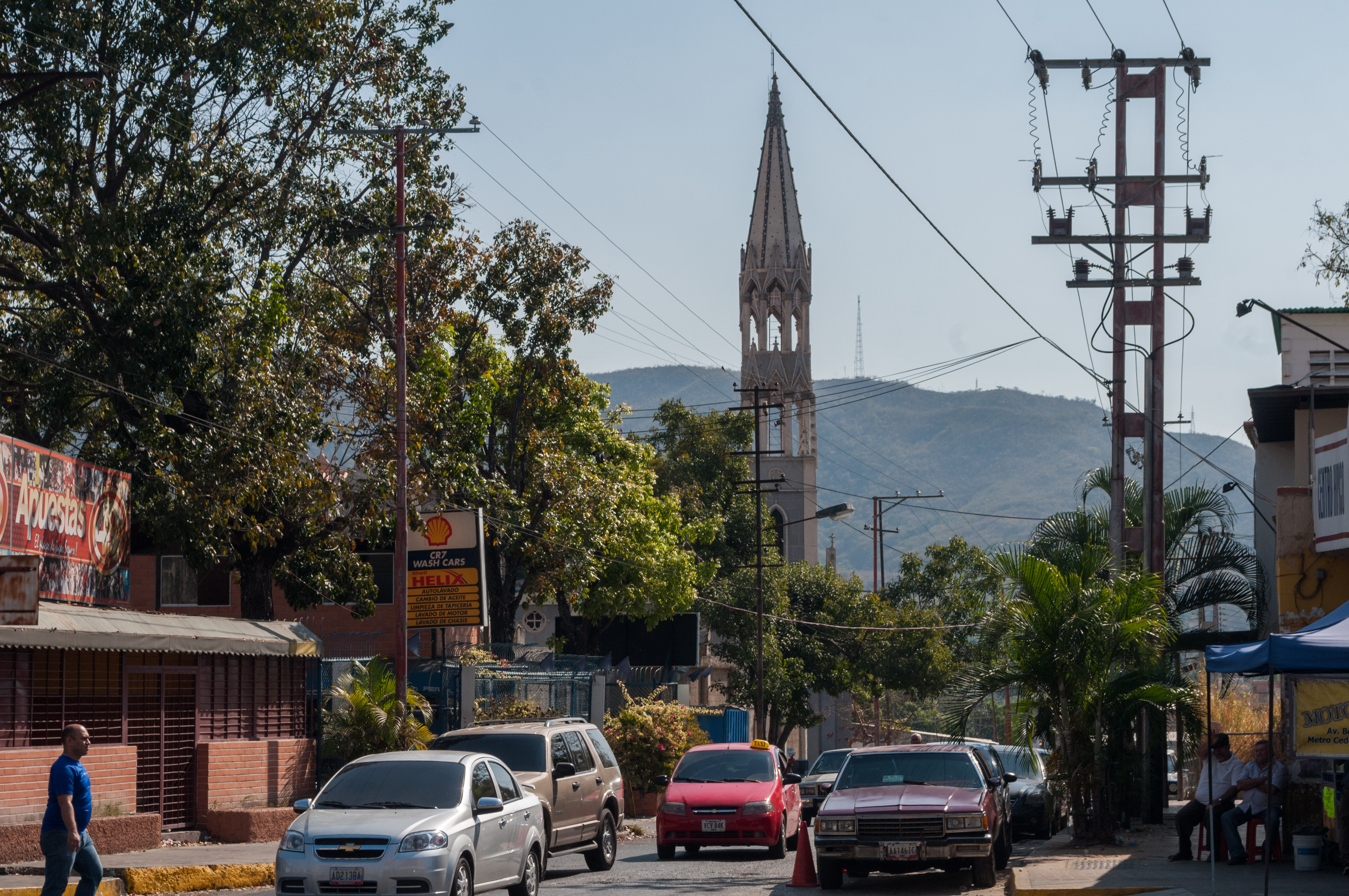
Street in Valencia.

== Notable people ==
=== Beauty pageant winners ===
- Génesis Carmona (died in the aftermath of street protest gunshot wound to the head, 19 February 2014)
- Jacqueline Aguilera (Miss World 1995)
- Marena Bencomo (Miss Venezuela 1996)
- Carolina Indriago (Miss Venezuela 1998)
- Ly Jonaitis (Miss Venezuela 2006)
- Gabriela Isler (Miss Venezuela 2012, Miss Universe 2013)
- Thalía Olvino, (Miss Venezuela 2019)
- Ileana Márquez, (Miss Venezuela 2023)

=== Composers and musicians ===
- Aldemaro Romero (1928–2007) pianist, composer, arranger and orchestral conductor
- El Prieto "Arvei Angulo Rivas" (born 1982) singer-songwriter and producer
- Mirla Castellanos singer

=== Painters ===
- Arturo Michelena (1863–1898) painter
- Braulio Salazar (1917–2008) painter

=== Politicians ===
- Francisco González Guinán (1841–1932) politician
- Guillermo Tell Villegas (1823–1907) former President of Venezuela
- Óscar Celli Gerbasi (1946–2016) Governor of Carabobo and President of Carabobo State Parliament

=== Athletes ===
- Henderson Álvarez (born 1990) Major League Baseball (MLB) pitcher for the Miami Marlins
- Gustavo Caraballo (born 2008) footballer
- Roger Cedeño (born 1974) former MLB outfielder
- Francisco Cervelli (born 1986) former MLB catcher for the Pittsburgh Pirates
- Álvaro Espinoza (born 1962) former MLB shortstop
- Wilmer Flores (born 1991) MLB shortstop for the San Francisco Giants
- Cesar Hernandez (born 1990), second baseman for the Philadelphia Phillies
- Félix Hernández (born 1986) former MLB starting pitcher for the Seattle Mariners
- Omar López (born 1977) MLB coach for the Houston Astros and Minor League Baseball infielder
- Josef Martínez (born 1993) footballer, MLS legend
- Edward Mujica (born 1984) MLB pitcher for the Boston Red Sox
- David Peralta (born 1987) MLB outfielder for the Arizona Diamondbacks
- Salvador Pérez (born 1990) MLB catcher for the Kansas City Royals
- Eduardo Rodríguez (born 1993) MLB pitcher for the Boston Red Sox
- Keibert Ruiz (born 1998) MLB catcher for the Washington Nationals
- Luis Manuel Seijas (born 1986) midfielder for the Club Independiente Santa Fe
- Milagros Sequera (born 1980) former professional tennis player

=== Entertainers ===
- Karen Hauer (born 1982), dancer and star of British television show Strictly Come Dancing
- Renny Ottolina (1928–1978) producer and entertainer
- Coraima Torres (born 1973) actress

=== Writers ===
- Vicente Gerbasi (1913–1992)

=== Others ===
- Humberto Rivas Mijares (1918–1981) writer, journalist and diplomat

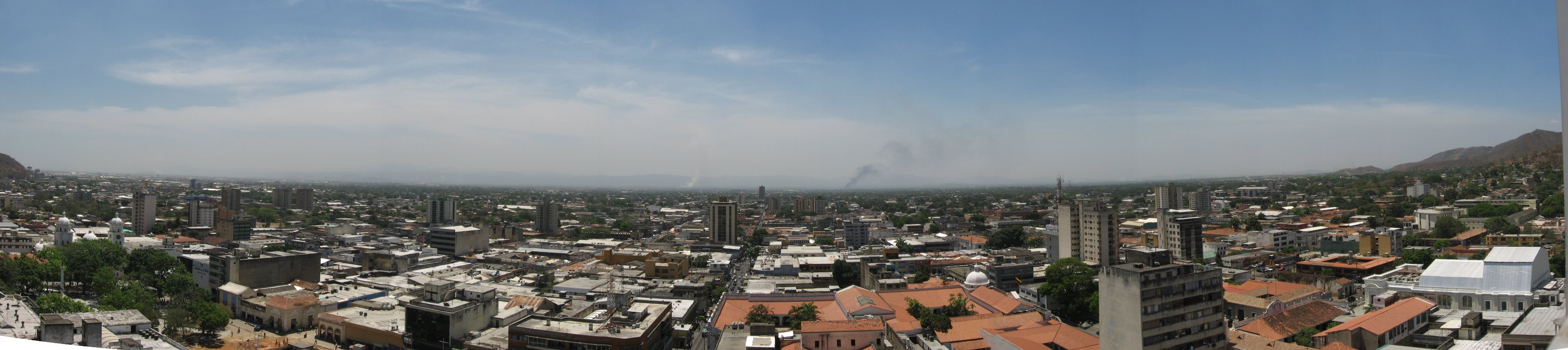
Panoramic view of Valencia.

== Twinning ==
Valencia is twinned with:

- Naples, Italy
- Valencia, Spain
- Madrid, Spain
- Sibiu, Romania
- Plovdiv, Bulgaria
- Saky, Ukraine
- Salihorsk, Belarus
- Tivat, Montenegro
- Veľký Krtíš, Slovakia
- Yevpatoria, Ukraine
- Ashdod, Israel
- Emden, Germany
- Jermuk, Armenia
- Oulu, Finland
- Portland, United States
- (Georgia (country)) Sokhumi, Georgia
- Vardø, Norway
- Cagliari, Italy
- Catania, Italy
- Forlì, Italy
- Brest, Belarus
- Córdoba, Argentina
- Maracay, Venezuela
- Salt Lake City, United States
- Tatabánya, Hungary
- Wuhan, China
- Xining, China
- Yambol, Bulgaria
- Bessastaðahreppur - Iceland
- Álftanes – Iceland
