= Plaza de Toros Monumental de Valencia =

Coordinates: 10.141974°N 67.995919°W

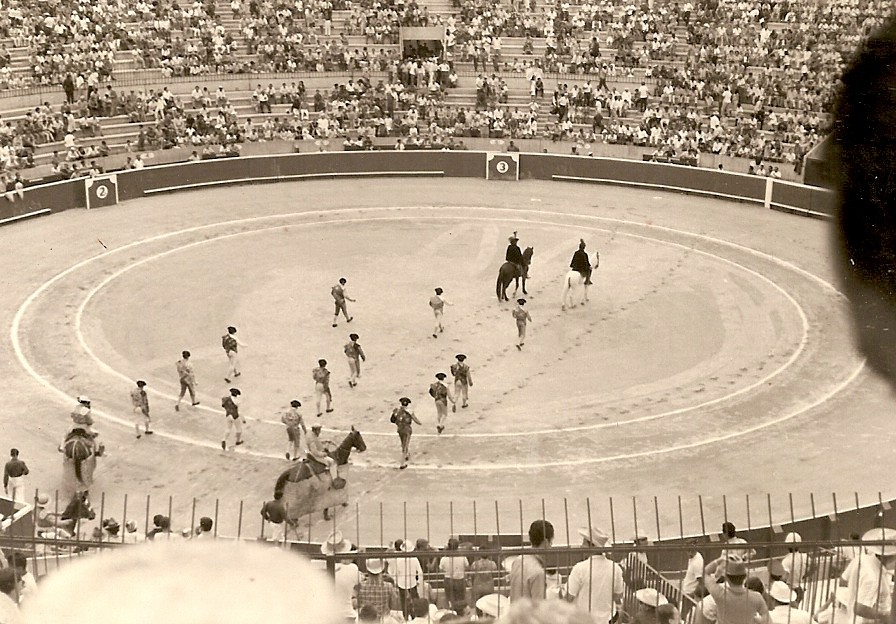
The bullring in 1972

Plaza de Toros Monumental de Valencia is a bull ring in Valencia, Venezuela. It is used for bull fighting and other events like concerts and fairs. It is the second largest bullring in the world, the first being the Plaza de toros México. The stadium holds 24,708 people and was built in 1968.
